= Ben Hur (2003 film) =

2003 animated film based on the Lew Wallace's 1880 novel Ben-Hur: A Tale of the Christ

- DVD cover
- Directed by: William R. Kowalchuk Jr.
- Written by: Abi Estrin Cunningham
- Based on: Ben-Hur: A Tale of the Christ; 1880 novel by Lew Wallace
- Produced by: William R. Kowalchuk Jr. John Stronach
- Starring: Charlton Heston
- Music by: Keith Heffner; Michael Lloyd
- Production companies: Agamemnon Films; Tundra Productions
- Distributed by: Goodtimes Entertainment
- Release date: February 15, 2003
- Running time: 80 minutes
- Countries: United States; Canada
- Language: English

Ben Hur is a 2003 animated drama film based on the 1880 novel Ben-Hur: A Tale of the Christ, by Lew Wallace. It is the fourth film adaptation of the novel, the prior three of which were the 1907 silent short film, the 1925 silent film, and the Academy Award-winning 1959 film.

Charlton Heston's production company, Agamemnon Films (in association with GoodTimes Entertainment), produced this direct-to-video animated version of the story, with Heston himself reprising his role as the title character. It would prove to be his final film role before his death in 2008.

== Synopsis ==
The animated version tells the same story as the 1959 film, with some differences. The story begins with Balthazar waiting in the desert for the two other wise men for a journey to Bethlehem. The story of Ben-Hur begins 30 years after the birth of Jesus.

In contrast to the 1925 and 1959 versions, the face of Jesus is shown and his words are heard in this film.

The character of Messala is different from the 1959 film. Appearing lame, he approaches Ben-Hur for forgiveness, and joins Ben-Hur's family and Balthazar to witness the passion of Jesus. Ben-Hur gives water to Jesus on the way to Calvary. As Jesus dies, Ben-Hur and his family, with Balthazar, Messala, and Esther, clasp their hands in prayer. Miracles occur when Jesus heals Ben-Hur's family of leprosy, and enables Messala to walk again. He comes near the cross thanking Jesus for the miracle.

At the film's end, Mary Magdalene sees Jesus emerge from the tomb and he ascends into heaven, giving the promise to the apostles to preach the gospel. Ben-Hur, now married to Esther, shares with his children his story and faith in Jesus.

== Voice cast ==
- Charlton Heston as Judah Ben-Hur
- Scott McNeil as Jesus, Number 59, Art Instructor
- Gerard Plunkett as Pontius Pilate, Mystic, Bystander #2
- Duncan Fraser as Messala, Melchior, Herod Antipas, Innkeeper, Bystander #1
- Tabitha St. Germain as Miriam, Woman, Young Woman, Woman #2
- Kathleen Barr as Esther, Female Angel, Mary Magdalene, Woman #1
- Willow Johnson as Tirzah, Mary
- Long John Baldry as Balthazer, Roman Captain, Roman Citizen, Leading Soldier, Citizen
- French Tickner as Gaspar, Jewish Man, Doctor
- Dale Wilson as Sheik Ilderim, Angel Gabriel, Scientist
- Mackenzie Gray as Rabbi, Priest, Soldier #1
- Richard Newman as Quintus Arrius, Shepherd #1, Merchant
- Ian James Corlett as Gesius, Andrew, Another Man
- Michael Dobson as Joseph, Soldier #2
- Lee Tockar as Judas, Shepherd #2, Guard, Slave
- Rob Court as Peter, Man, Leper
- Russell Roberts as Roman Merchant, Archery Instructor
- William Samples as Roman Soldier

== Production ==
In June 2002, it was announced Charlton Heston would be playing the titular role of Ben Hur in direct-to-video to be distributed by GoodTimes Entertainment having previously played the character in the 1959 film of the same name. The project was put together by Agamemnon Films, the production company of Heston's son Fraser Clarke Heston. Production on the film took place from January through August 2002 utilizing a mixture of traditional animation integrated with CGI elements. The team had previously produced a series of 45 minute direct-to-video projects called The Greatest Adventure: Stories from the Bible. The production team made a conscious effort to downplay some of the more overtly Biblical aspects of the story.
