= Virginia v. West Virginia =

Virginia v. West Virginia may refer to:

- Virginia v. West Virginia, 78 U.S. 39 (1871)
- Virginia v. West Virginia, 220 U.S. 1 (1911)
- Virginia v. West Virginia, 206 U.S. 290 (1907)
- Virginia v. West Virginia, 209 U.S. 514 (1908)
- Virginia v. West Virginia, 222 U.S. 17 (1911)
- Virginia v. West Virginia, 231 U.S. 89 (1913)
- Virginia v. West Virginia, 234 U.S. 117 (1914)
- Virginia v. West Virginia, 238 U.S. 202 (1915)
- Virginia v. West Virginia, 241 U.S. 531 (1916)
- Virginia v. West Virginia, 246 U.S. 565 (1918)
