= Kalem Co. v. Harper Bros. =

- Supreme Court of the United States

Argued October 31 – November 1, 1911 Decided November 13, 1911
- Full case name: Kalem Co. v. Harper Bros.
- Citations: 222 U.S. 55 (more) 32 S. Ct. 20; 56 L. Ed. 92

Holding
- Producing a motion picture based on a dramatic work can be copyright infringement. The producer of the motion picture is liable even they are not the exhibitor. This does not extend to a restriction of the dramatic work's ideas; it is a recognition of the author's monopoly powers granted by Congress.

Court membership
- Chief Justice Edward D. White Associate Justices Joseph McKenna · Oliver W. Holmes Jr. William R. Day · Horace H. Lurton; Charles E. Hughes · Willis Van Devanter; Joseph R. Lamar

Case opinion
- Majority: Holmes Jr., joined by unanimous

Kalem Co. v. Harper Bros., 222 U.S. 55 (1911), was a United States Supreme Court case in which the Court held producing a motion picture based on a dramatic work can be copyright infringement. The producer of the motion picture is liable even they are not the exhibitor. This does not extend to a restriction of the dramatic work's ideas; it is a recognition of the author's monopoly powers granted by Congress.

The case involved a 1907 film adaptation of the 1880 novel Ben-Hur: A Tale of the Christ by Lew Wallace.

== Background ==
Lew Wallace, a former Union army general, wrote Ben-Hur: A Tale of the Christ in 1880, which became one of the best-selling works at its time surpassing Uncle Tom's Cabin. According to contemporary author Amy Lifson in Ben-Hur: The Book that Shook the World, Ben-Hur was "the most influential Christian book written in the nineteenth century". The popularity of the novel led to many attempts to profit off the book, which Wallace fought in court until his death in 1905. Wallace did relent on requests for a stage adaption, which was first run in 1899.

At that time, America's film industry was beginning to develop. Kalem Company, one of the first film production companies in silent black-and-white films, took the opportunity to make a film adaptation of Ben-Hur without seeking permission from the rights holder, held by the publisher Harper & Brothers. The film, only fifteen minutes long and on a single reel, was first presented to audiences in December 1907 and shown about 500 times before shut down by legal complaints from Harper, Wallace's son Henry Lane Wallace, and the play producers Marc Klaw and Abraham Lincoln Erlanger.

In court, Kalem's lawyers argued that the scriptwriter had been working from a first edition of Ben-Hur before it had been granted copyright, and further argued that film, which they claimed as only a series of photographs, was a different type of expression different from the written word. Judge Emile Henry Lacombe did not accept this argument, ruling against Kalem in May 1908 in that their "moving picture" that had used ideas from the book violated copyright. The studio appealed to the Second Circuit, claiming that only Congress had the right to deem what works qualified for copyright. Second Circuit Judge Henry Galbraith Ward denied the appeal in March 1909 and stated that even a series of moving pictures would qualify as a form of expression and thus covered under copyright law.

== Supreme Court ==
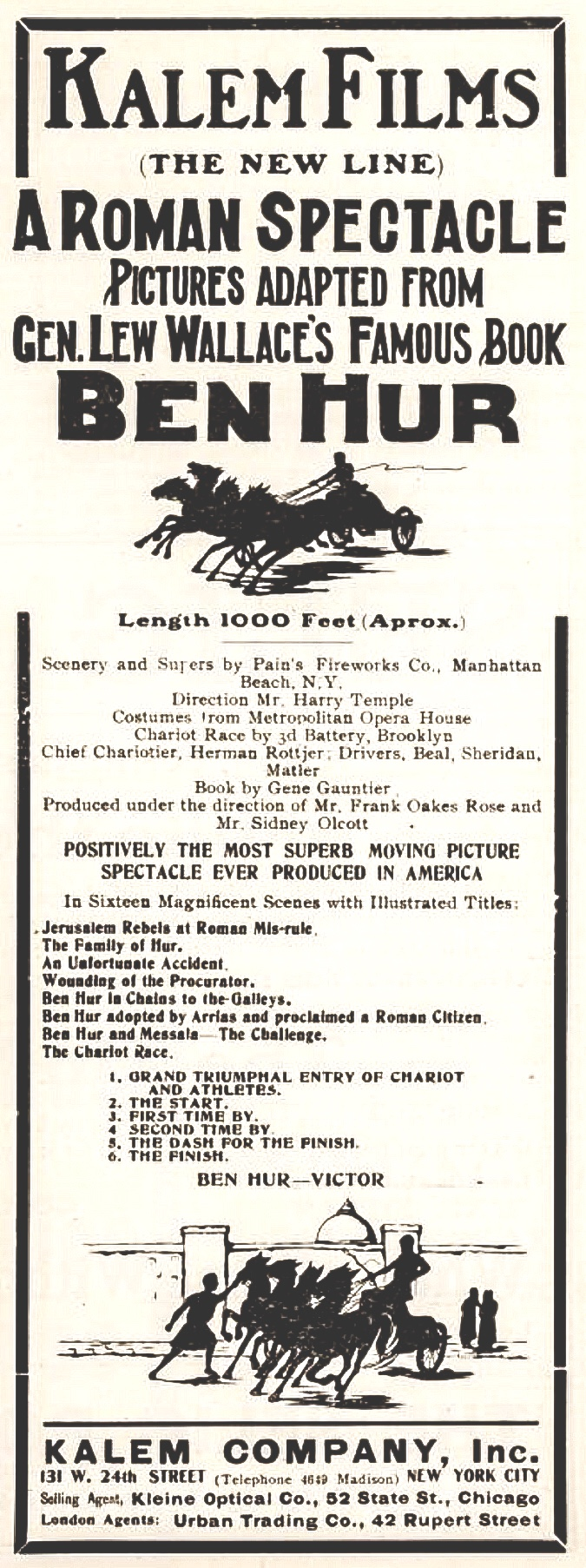
Advertisement for the film referencing the Wallace novel

Kalem petitioned to the Supreme Court to challenge the lower courts' rulings. Because of the potential impact of the decision on the film industry, Kalem brought in the support of the Motion Picture Patents Company (MPPC) to help finance the legal challenge to the Supreme Court. The Court certified the case, and heard oral arguments on October 21, 1911, and November 1, 1911.

MPPC's lawyers argued again that moving pictures were a new form of medium not yet covered by copyright law. They further argued to the Supreme Court that because Kalem only produced the work but did not exhibit the work, they were not the ones at fault for presenting the work to audiences and thus not liable for copyright.

The Court issued its unanimous decision on November 13, 1911, upholding the prior rulings against Kalem. The court's opinion was written by Justice Oliver Wendell Holmes Jr., which stated that Kalem created "an unlawful dramatization of the novel", and further "the defendant not only expected but invoked by advertisement the use of its films for dramatic reproduction of the story", rejecting the idea that the exhibitors were at fault. Kalem and MPPC were forced to pay a $25,000 fine (equivalent to $863,839 in 2025), which made Ben-Hur the most expensive film at its time. Kalem was forced to destroy all copies of the film as well, though at least one copy had survived, later found and kept at the Library of Congress.

== Impact ==
The result of Kalem led to the fledging film industry to seek out adaptions of works through legal, authorized agreements with their copyright owners. According to Jon Solomon in The Ancient World in Silent Cinema, the focus on adaptions created the need for competent scriptwriters that could readily convert novels into moving pictures.
