= Ben Hur Live =

Ben Hur Live is a 2009 stage adaptation of Lew Wallace's 1880 novel Ben-Hur: A Tale of the Christ. Produced by Franz Abraham with music and narration by Stewart Copeland, it premièred on 17 September 2009 at the O2 Arena in London, the first date of its European tour.

The show's dialogue is in Latin and Aramaic, and it includes a sea battle and gladiatorial combat, as well as the chariot race for which Ben Hur is famous. It is based primarily on the book as its source material rather than the 1959 Academy Award-winning adaptation which starred Charlton Heston.

== Reception ==
After its London première, it received mixed reviews from theatre critics.

== Creative Team ==
- Concept and Production - Franz Abraham
- Direction - Philip Wm. McKinley
- Music and English Narration - Stewart Copeland
- German Narration - Ben Becker
- Design - Mark Fisher and Ray Winkler
- Horse Training and Stunt Coordination - Nicki Pfeifer
- Lighting Design - Patrick Woodroffe
- Choreography - Liam Steel
- Fight Direction - Rick Sordelet
- Book - Shaun McKenna
- Costumes - Ann Would-Hard

== 2009 Principal Cast ==
- Judah Ben-Hur - Sebastian Thrun
- Messala - Michael Knese
- Esther - Lili Gesler
- Quintus Arrius - Anton Grünbeck
- Sheik Ilderim - László Rókas
- Miriam - Marina Krauser
- Tirzah - Nina Wilden
