= Ben-Hur: A Tale of the Christ (1925 film) =

1925 film by Fred Niblo

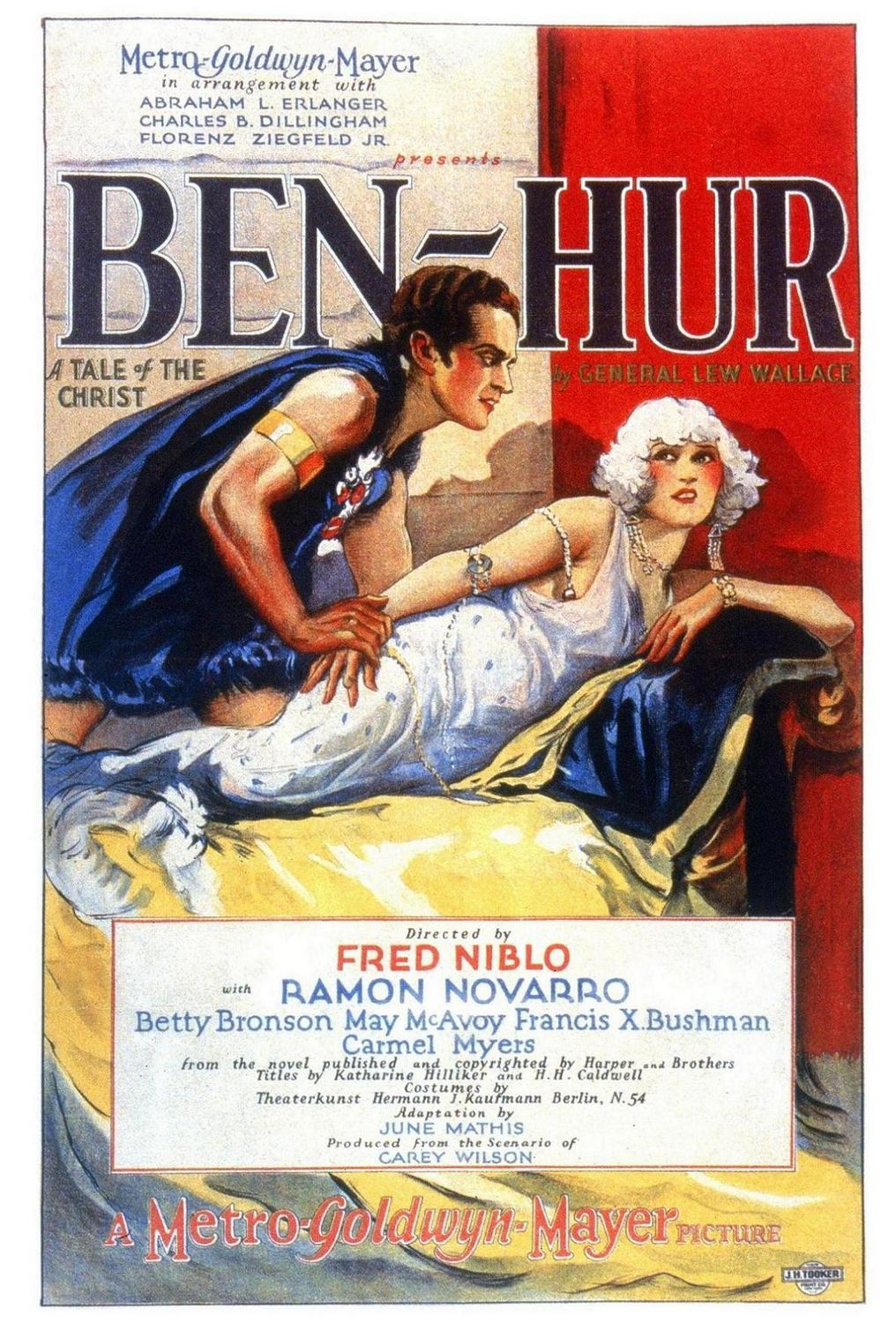
- Theatrical release poster
- Directed by: Fred Niblo; Uncredited: Charles Brabin
- Screenplay by: Adaptation: June Mathis; Scenario: Carey Wilson; Continuity: Bess Meredyth; Carey Wilson; Titles: H. H. Caldwell; Katharine Hilliker
- Based on: Ben-Hur: A Tale of the Christ; 1880 novel by General Lew Wallace
- Produced by: Uncredited: June Mathis; Louis B. Mayer; Irving Thalberg
- Starring: Ramon Novarro; May McAvoy; Betty Bronson; Francis X. Bushman; Carmel Myers
- Cinematography: Clyde DeVinna; Rene Guissart; Percy Hilburn (*French); Karl Struss
- Edited by: Lloyd Nosler; Basil Wrangell; William Holmes; Harry Reynolds; Ben Lewis
- Music by: William Axt; David Mendoza; Stewart Copeland (2014 edition)
- Production company: Metro-Goldwyn-Mayer
- Distributed by: Metro-Goldwyn-Mayer
- Release dates: December 30, 1925 (New York City, premiere)
- Running time: 141 minutes
- Country: United States
- Language: Silent (English intertitles)
- Budget: $4 million
- Box office: $10.7 million

Ben-Hur: A Tale of the Christ is a 1925 American silent epic adventure-drama film directed by Fred Niblo and written by June Mathis based on the 1880 novel of the same name by General Lew Wallace. Starring Ramon Novarro as the title character, the film is the first feature-length adaptation of the novel and second overall, following the 1907 silent short film. In 1997, Ben-Hur: A Tale of the Christ was selected for preservation in the United States National Film Registry by the Library of Congress as being "culturally, historically, or aesthetically significant." The film entered the public domain in 2021.

== Plot ==
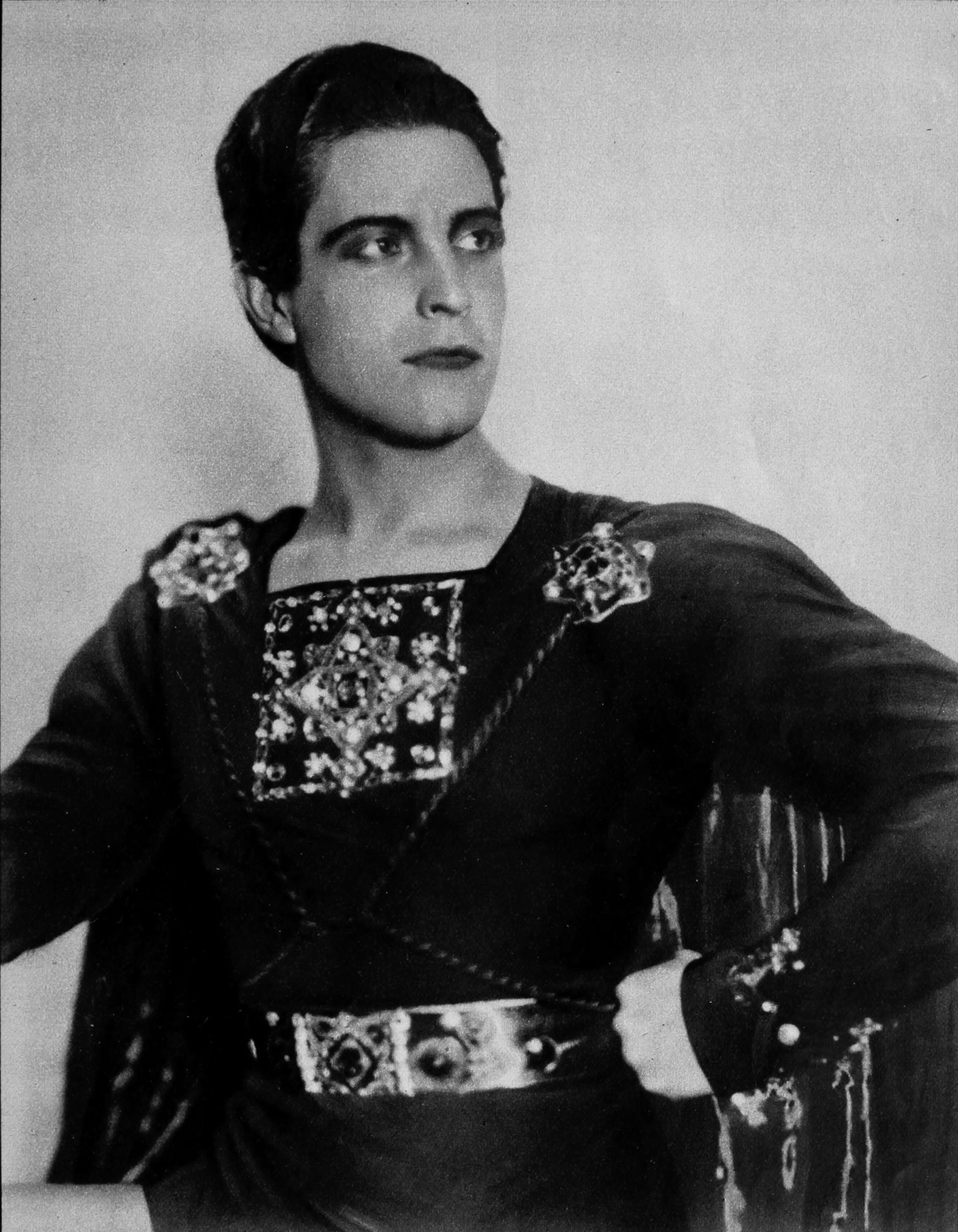
Ramon Novarro as Ben-Hur

At the Joppa Gate in Jerusalem, Mary and Joseph pass through on their way from Nazareth to Bethlehem. They stop at the inn at the entrance to the city, but there is no available room. Mary is pregnant and as labor begins, they settle in a nearby cave where a baby is born in Bethlehem among the shepherds and visited by the Magi.

Judah Ben-Hur, a wealthy Jewish man, returns from Antioch and reconnects with his Roman childhood friend, Messala. Judah invites him to his home with his mother Miriam and younger sister Tirzah. Messala fully embraces Rome's glory and imperial power over the Jewish people while Judah remains devoted to the Jewish people's freedom.

Valerius Gratus, the new Roman governor of Judaea, and his procession enter the city as Judah and Tirzah watch from an upper terrace. Loose roof tiles fall, frightening the governor's horse and throwing him off. Messala condemns Judah to the galleys and imprisons Miriam and Tirzah. Judah vows revenge upon Messala. As he and other slaves are marched to the galleys, they stop in Nazareth. Denied water, Judah collapses but is revived when Jesus, the carpenter's son, offers him water.

Judah is sentenced to slave labor in a Roman war galley. Once aboard ship, his attitude of defiance and strength impresses a Roman admiral, Quintus Arrius, who allows him to remain unchained. Soon, his ship is attacked and sunk by pirates, and Judah saves Arrius from drowning. Arrius then adopts Judah as his son, and over the years Ben-Hur becomes a victorious chariot racer. He receives permission from Arrius to travel to Antioch, where he meets with Simonides, a former merchant for the Hur family. Judah also meets Esther, Simonides's daughter, whom he encountered years earlier. He is told by Simonides that Miriam and Tirzah are dead. Meanwhile, Sheik Ilderim is competing in a chariot race and selects Judah to drive his horses. Judah refuses at first until he learns Messala will also compete in the race.

At the arena, Judah has a flirtation with Iras, who then tells Messala that Judah is alive. Before the chariot race, Ben-Hur and Messala confront each other, and Messala wagers fifty-thousand pieces of gold to win. During the race, Messala wrecks his chariot when it comes too close to Judah's. He is trampled by another chariot while Judah wins the race. However, Messala does not die.

In Ilderim's tent, he is visited by Balthazar who states the Messiah is an adult man. Judah pledges to give Jesus his wealth in hopes he will overthrow the Romans. Judah and Balthazar head back to Judaea where Judah finances two legions. Pontius Pilate is the new governor of Judaea who releases prisoners held without a documented crime record. Miriam and Tirzah, who have developed leprosy, are freed and venture into the Valley of the Lepers. On their way, they see Judah sleeping outside of the Hur mansion. Judah and Esther reunite, but he leaves when he learns that Jesus has been arrested. Esther eventually sees Miriam and Tirzah but conceals their whereabouts from Judah.

The next day, convinced that Jesus can heal them, Esther takes Miriam and Tirzah to meet him. During the crucifixion, Judah hears Jesus's voice, stating his kingdom is not of this world and to put away his sword. Jesus later revives a dead child and miraculously cures Miriam and Tirzah. Judah sees his healed mother and sister and reunites with them. Jesus dies and an earthquake occurs. Balthazar informs the legion armies of Jesus's death and disperses them, telling them to forgive their enemies and love one another.

Reunited with his family, Judah states Jesus is not dead and will live forever.

== Cast ==
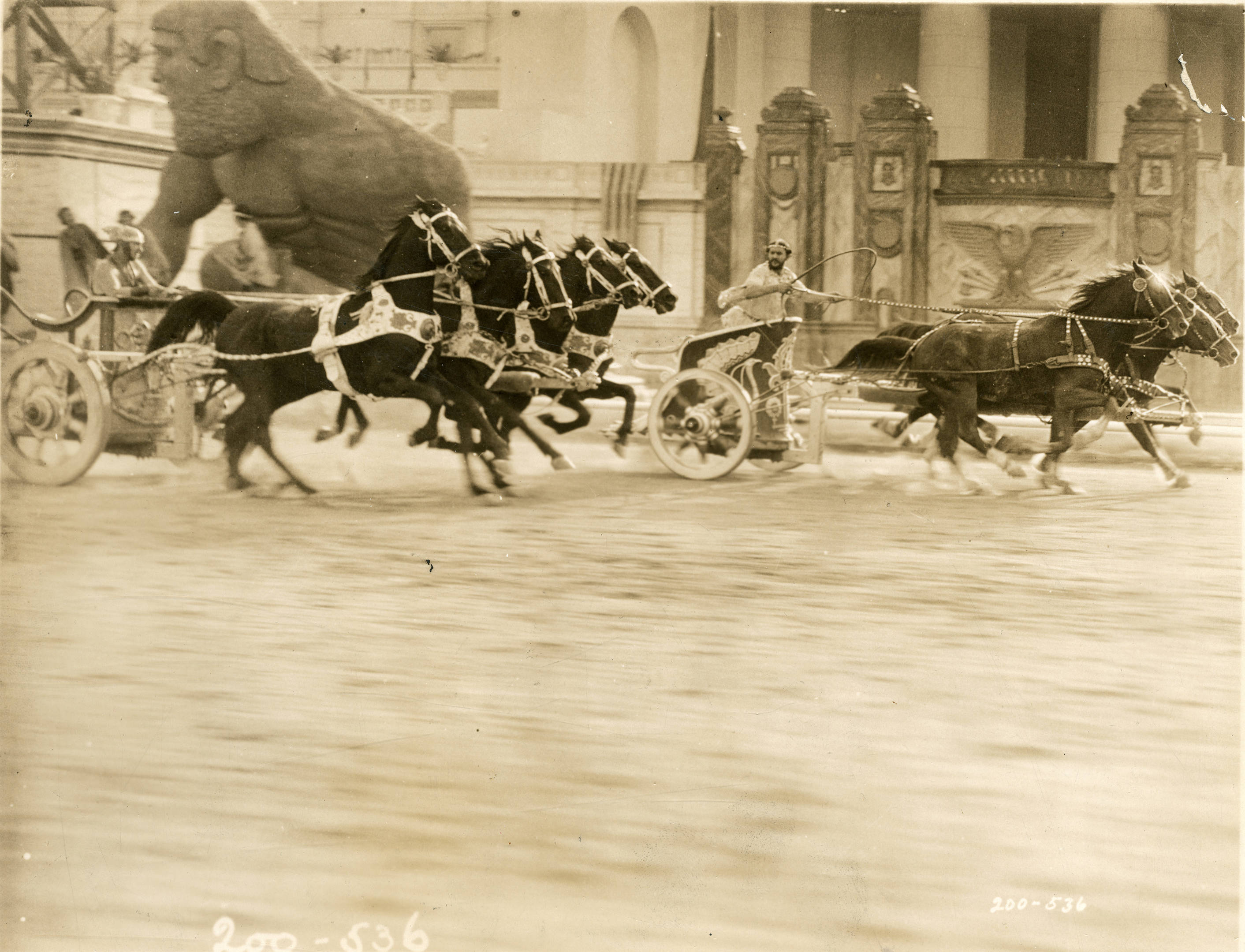
Promotional still of the chariot race in Ben-Hur

Main

- Ramon Novarro as Ben-Hur
- Francis X. Bushman as Messala
- May McAvoy as Esther
- Betty Bronson as Mary
- Claire McDowell as Princess of Hur
- Kathleen Key as Tirzah
- Carmel Myers as Iras
- Nigel de Brulier as Simonides
- Mitchell Lewis as Sheik Ilderim
- Leo White as Sanballat
- Frank Currier as Arrius
- Charles Belcher as Balthazar
- Dale Fuller as Amrah
- Winter Hall as Joseph
- Claude Payton as Jesus Christ (uncredited)
- George Walsh (he shot almost the entire film, but was replaced by Ramon Novarro)

Some notable crowd extras during chariot race

- Reginald Barker
- John Barrymore
- Lionel Barrymore
- Clarence Brown
- Joan Crawford
- Marion Davies
- Douglas Fairbanks
- George Fitzmaurice
- Sidney Franklin
- John Gilbert
- Dorothy Gish
- Lillian Gish
- Samuel Goldwyn
- Sid Grauman
- Rupert Julian
- Henry King
- Harold Lloyd
- Carole Lombard
- Myrna Loy
- Colleen Moore
- Mary Pickford

== Production ==
Ben-Hur: A Tale of The Christ had been a great success as a novel, and was adapted into a stage play which ran for twenty-five years. In 1922, two years after the play's last tour, the Goldwyn company purchased the film rights to Ben-Hur. The play's producer Abraham Erlanger put a heavy price on the screen rights. Erlanger was persuaded to accept a generous profit participation deal and total approval over every detail of the production.

Choosing the title role was difficult for June Mathis. Rudolph Valentino and dancer Paul Swan were considered until George Walsh was chosen. When asked why she chose him, Mathis answered it was because of his eyes and his body. Gertrude Olmstead was cast as Esther. While on location in Italy, Walsh was fired and replaced by Ramon Novarro. The role of Esther went to May McAvoy.

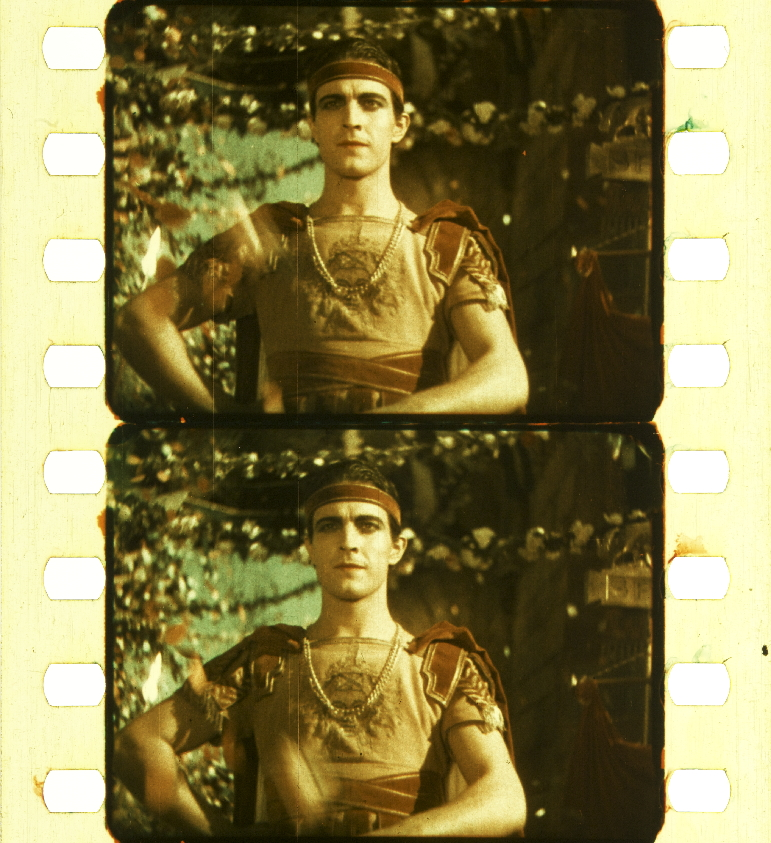
Technicolor frames from the film's trailer

Shooting began in Rome, Italy in October 1923 under the direction of Charles Brabin, who was replaced shortly after filming began. Other re-castings (apart from Ramon Novarro as Ben-Hur) and a change of director caused the production's budget to skyrocket. After two years of difficulties and accidents, the production was eventually moved back to Metro-Goldwyn-Mayer in Culver City, California and production resumed in the spring of 1925. B. Reeves Eason and Christy Cabanne directed the second unit footage.

Romain de Tirtoff, better known under the pseudonym Erté, was one of the most highly sought costume and production designers in the world. He designed costumes and sets for the film.

Production costs eventually rose to $3,900,000 ($71,600,000 today) compared to MGM's average for the season of $158,000 ($2,900,000 today), making Ben-Hur the most expensive film of the silent era.

A total of 200,000 feet (61,000 m) of film was shot for the chariot race sequence, which led editor Lloyd Nosler eventually cut to 750 feet (230 m) for the released print. Film historian and critic Kevin Brownlow has described the race sequence as "breathtakingly exciting, and as creative a piece of cinema as the Odessa Steps sequence from Battleship Potemkin", the Soviet film also released in 1925, directed by Sergei Eisenstein who introduced many modern concepts of editing and montage composition to motion-picture production. Visual elements of the chariot race have been much imitated. The race's opening sequence was re-created shot-for-shot in the 1959 remake, copied in the 1998 animated film The Prince of Egypt, and imitated in the pod race scene in the 1999 film Star Wars: Episode I – The Phantom Menace.

Some of the scenes in the 1925 film were shot in two-color Technicolor, most notably the sequences involving Jesus. One of the assistant directors for this sequence was a young William Wyler, who would direct the 1959 MGM remake. The black-and-white footage was color tinted and toned in the film's original release print. MGM released a second remake of Ben-Hur in 2016.

== Reception ==
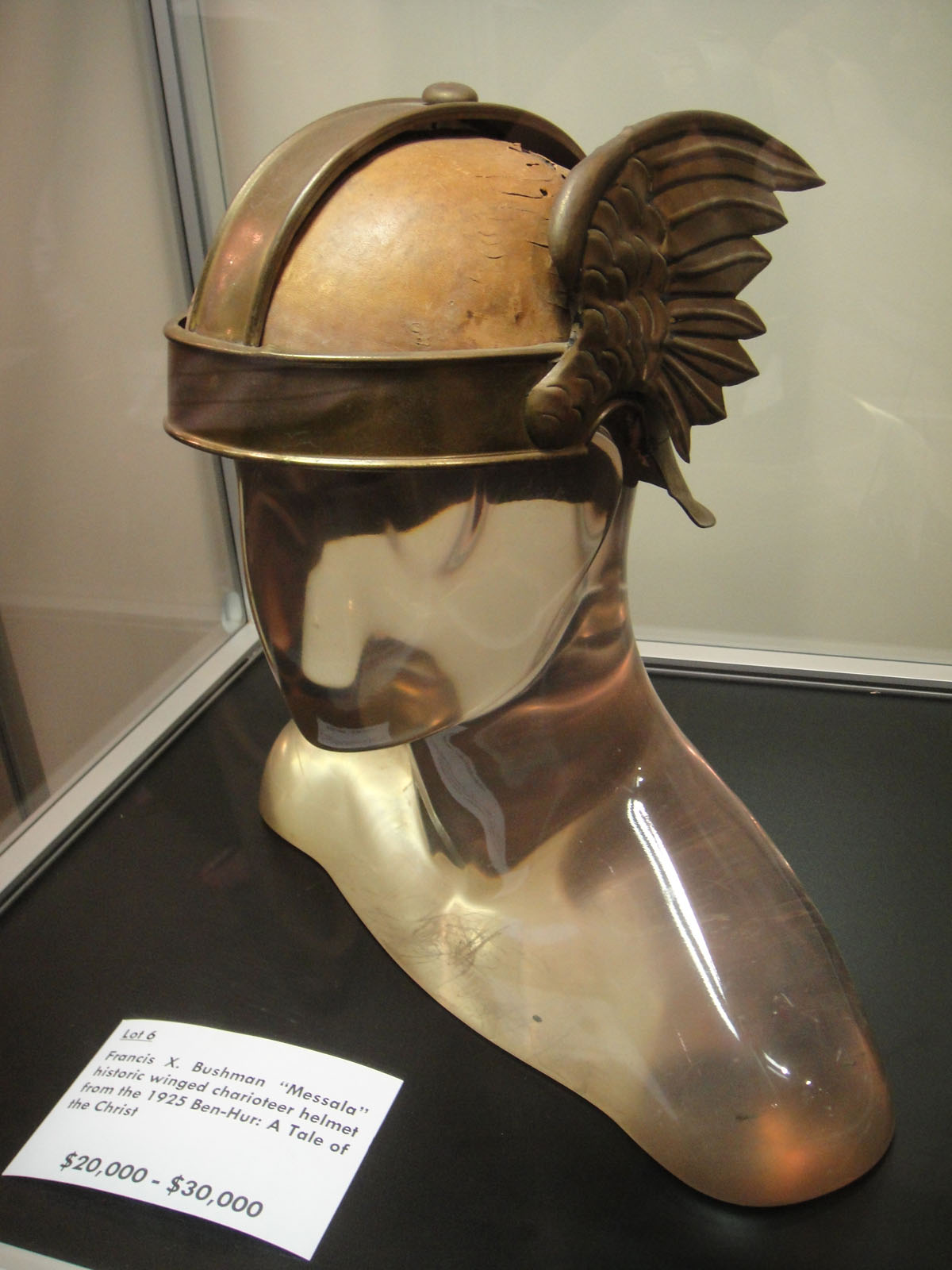
Messala's winged helmet, worn by Francis X. Bushman in Ben-Hur, sold at the Debbie Reynolds auction of film memorabilia (2011)

The studio's publicity department was relentless in promoting the film, advertising it with lines like: "The Picture Every Christian Ought to See!" and "The Supreme Motion Picture Masterpiece of All Time". Ben Hur went on to become MGM's highest-grossing film, with rentals of $9 million worldwide. Its foreign earnings of $5 million were not surpassed at MGM for at least 25 years. Despite the large revenues, its huge expenses and the deal with Erlanger made it a net financial loss for MGM. It recorded an overall loss of $698,000.

In terms of publicity and prestige however, it was a great success. "The screen has yet to reveal anything more exquisitely moving than the scenes at Bethlehem, the blazing of the star in the heavens, the shepherds and the Wise Men watching. The gentle, radiant Madonna of Betty Bronson's is a masterpiece," wrote a reviewer for Photoplay. "No one," they concluded, "no matter what his age or religion, should miss it. And take the children." It helped establish the new MGM as a major studio.

The film was re-released in 1931 with an added musical score, by the original composers William Axt and David Mendoza, and sound effects. As the decades passed, the original two-color Technicolor segments were replaced by alternative black-and-white takes. Ben-Hur earned $1,352,000 during its re-release, including $1,153,000 of foreign earnings, and made a profit of $779,000 meaning it had an overall profit of $81,000. The review aggregator website Rotten Tomatoes reported that 96% of critics have given the film a positive review based on 23 reviews, with an average rating of 7.8/10.

The film became controversial after its release for the harm to animals involved in the filming. A reported one hundred horses were tripped and killed merely to produce the set piece footage of the major chariot race. Animal advocates especially criticized the use of the "running W" on set, a wire device that could trip a galloping horse. It would take a decade before such devices lost favor in Hollywood.

The movie was banned in the 1930s in China under the category of "superstitious films" due to its religious subject matter involving gods and deities.

== Restoration and home video ==
Ben-Hur: A Tale of the Christ (1925; 1988 restored version)

The Technicolor scenes were considered lost until the 1980s when Turner Entertainment (who by then had acquired the rights to the MGM film library) found the crucial sequences in the Czechoslovak Film Archive (now the Czech National Film Archive). Current prints of the 1925 version are from the Turner-supervised restoration which includes the color tints and Technicolor sections set to resemble the original theatrical release. There is an addition of a newly recorded stereo orchestral soundtrack by Carl Davis with the London Philharmonic Orchestra which was originally recorded for a Thames Television screening of the movie.

Ben-Hur was first released, complete with the Technicolor segments, on VHS and Laserdisc by MGM/UA Home Video in 1988. In 2005, it was released attached to the four-disc DVD collector's edition of the 1959 version starring Charlton Heston, as well as in the 2011 "Fiftieth Anniversary Edition" Blu-ray Collector's Edition three-disc box set.

In 2022, a new restoration by The Film Foundation was made with funding from the Hollywood Foreign Press Association.

== See also ==
- List of early color feature films
- List of films featuring slavery
- Francis X. Bushman filmography
- List of films with a 100% rating on Rotten Tomatoes, a film review aggregator website

== Bibliography ==
- Keel, A. Chester, "The Fiasco of 'Ben Hur'," Photoplay, November 1924, p. 32.
