= Ben-Hur: A Tale of the Christ =

1880 novel by Lew Wallace

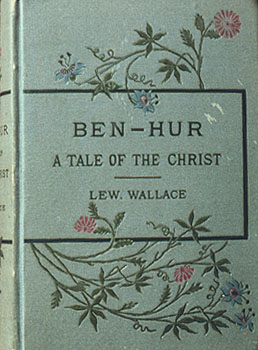
- First edition, 1880
- Author: Lew Wallace
- Language: English
- Genre: Historical fiction, Christian literature
- Publisher: Harper & Brothers
- Publication date: November 12, 1880
- Publication place: United States
- Media type: Print (hardback & paperback)
- LC Class: PS3134 .B4 1880
- Text: Ben-Hur: A Tale of the Christ at Wikisource

Ben-Hur: A Tale of the Christ is a novel by Lew Wallace, published by Harper and Brothers on November 12, 1880, and considered "the most influential Christian book of the nineteenth century". It became a best-selling American novel, surpassing Harriet Beecher Stowe's Uncle Tom's Cabin (1852) in sales. The book also inspired other novels with biblical settings and was adapted for the stage and motion picture productions.

Ben-Hur remained at the top of the U.S. all-time bestseller list until the 1936 publication of Margaret Mitchell's Gone with the Wind. The 1959 MGM film adaptation of Ben-Hur is considered one of the greatest films ever made and was seen by tens of millions, going on to win a record 11 Academy Awards in 1960, after which the book's sales increased and it surpassed Gone with the Wind. It was blessed by Pope Leo XIII, the first novel ever to receive such an honor. The success of the novel and its stage and film adaptations also helped it to become a popular cultural icon that was used to promote numerous commercial products.

The story recounts the adventures of Judah Ben-Hur, a Jewish prince from Jerusalem, who is enslaved by the Romans at the beginning of the first century and becomes a charioteer and a Christian. Running in parallel with Judah's narrative is the unfolding story of Jesus, from the same region and around the same age. The novel reflects themes of betrayal, conviction, and redemption, with a revenge plot that leads to a story of love and compassion.

== Plot summary ==
Ben-Hur is a story of a fictional hero named Judah Ben-Hur, a Jewish nobleman who was falsely accused and convicted of an attempted assassination of the Roman governor of Judaea and consequently enslaved by the Romans. He becomes a successful charioteer. The story's revenge plot becomes a story of compassion and forgiveness.

The novel is divided into eight books, or parts, each with its own subchapters. Book one opens with the story of the three Magi, who arrive in Bethlehem to hear the news of Christ's birth. Readers meet the fictional character of Judah for the first time in book two, when his childhood friend Messala, also a fictional character, returns to Jerusalem as an ambitious commanding officer of the Roman legions. The teen-aged boys come to realize that they have changed and hold very different views and aspirations. When a loose tile is accidentally dislodged from the roof of Judah's house during a military parade and strikes the Roman governor, knocking him from his horse, Messala falsely accuses Judah of attempted assassination. Although Judah is not guilty and receives no trial, he is sent to the Roman galleys for life, his mother and sister are imprisoned in a Roman jail where they contract leprosy, and all the family property is confiscated. Judah first encounters Jesus, who offers him a drink of water and encouragement, as Judah is being marched to the seacoast to be a galley slave. Their lives continue to intersect as the story unfolds.

In book three, Judah survives his ordeal as a galley slave through good fortune, which includes befriending and saving the commander of his ship, who later adopts him. Judah goes on to become a trained soldier and charioteer. In books four and five, Judah returns home to Jerusalem to seek revenge and redemption for his family.

After witnessing the Crucifixion, Judah recognizes that Christ's life stands for a goal quite different from revenge. Judah becomes Christian, inspired by love and the talk of keys to a kingdom greater than any on Earth. The novel concludes with Judah's decision to finance the Catacomb of Callixtus in Rome, where Christian martyrs are to be buried and venerated.

== Detailed synopsis ==
=== Part One ===
Biblical references: Matthew 2:1–12, Luke 2:1–20

Three magi have come from the East. Balthasar, an Egyptian, sets up a tent in the desert, where he is joined by Melchior, a Hindu, and Gaspar, a Greek. They discover they have been brought together by their common goal. They see a bright star shining over the region, and take it as a sign to leave, following it through the desert toward the province of Judaea.

At the Joppa Gate in Jerusalem, Mary and Joseph pass through on their way from Nazareth to Bethlehem. They stop at the inn at the entrance to the city, but it has no room. Mary is pregnant and, as labor begins, they head to a cave on a nearby hillside, where Jesus is born. In the pastures outside the city, a group of seven shepherds watches their flocks. Angels announce the Christ's birth. The shepherds hurry towards the city and enter the cave on the hillside to worship the Christ. They spread the news of the Christ's birth and many come to see him.

The magi arrive in Jerusalem and inquire for news of the Christ. Herod the Great is angry to hear of another king challenging his rule and asks the Sanhedrin to find information for him. The Sanhedrin delivers a prophecy written by Micah, telling of a ruler to come from Bethlehem Ephrathah, which they interpret to signify the Christ's birthplace.

=== Part Two ===
Biblical references: Luke 2:51–52

Judah Ben-Hur, son of Ithamar, is a prince descended from a royal family of Judaea. Messala, his closest childhood friend and the son of a Roman tax collector, leaves home for five years of education in Rome. He returns as a proud Roman. He mocks Judah and his religion and the two become enemies. As a result, Judah decides to go to Rome for military training to use his acquired skills to fight the Roman Empire.

Valerius Gratus, the fourth Roman prefect of Judaea, passes by Judah's house. As Judah watches the procession from his rooftop, a loose roof tile happens to fall and hit the governor. Messala betrays Judah, who is quickly captured and accused of attempting to murder Gratus. No trial is held; Judah's entire family is secretly imprisoned in the Antonia Fortress and all their property is seized. As he is taken away, Judah vows vengeance against the Romans. He is sent as a slave to work aboard a Roman warship. On the journey to the ship, he meets a young carpenter named Jesus, who offers him water, which deeply moves Judah and strengthens his resolve to survive.

=== Part Three ===
In Italy, Greek pirate ships have been looting Roman vessels in the Aegean Sea. The prefect Sejanus orders the Roman Quintus Arrius to take warships to combat the pirates. Chained on one of the warships, Judah has survived three hard years as a Roman slave, kept alive by his passion for vengeance. Arrius is impressed by Judah and decides to question him about his life and his story. He is stunned to learn of Judah's former status as a son of Hur. Arrius tells the slave-master not to lock Judah's shackles. In battle, the ship is damaged and starts to sink. Judah saves the Roman from drowning. They share a plank as a makeshift raft until being rescued by a Roman ship, whereupon they learn that the Romans were victorious in the battle; Arrius is lauded as a hero. They return to Misenum, where Arrius adopts Judah as his son, making him a freedman and a Roman citizen.

=== Part Four ===
Judah Ben-Hur trains in wrestling for five years in the Palaestra in Rome before becoming the heir of Arrius after his death. While traveling to Antioch on state business, Judah learns that his real father's chief servant, the slave Simonides, lives in a house in this city, and has the trust of Judah's father's possessions, which he has invested so well that he is now wealthy. Judah visits Simonides, who listens to his story, but demands more proof of his identity. Ben-Hur says he has no proof, but asks if Simonides knows of the fate of Judah's mother and sister. He says he knows nothing and Judah leaves the house. Simonides sends his servant Malluch to spy on Judah to see if his story is true and to learn more about him. Shortly afterwards, Malluch meets and befriends Judah in the Grove of Daphne, and they go to the games stadium together. There, Ben-Hur finds his old rival Messala racing one of the chariots, preparing for a tournament.

The Sheik Ilderim announces that he is looking for a chariot driver to race his team in the coming tournament. Judah, wanting revenge, offers to drive the sheik's chariot, as he intends to defeat Messala and humiliate him before the Roman Empire. Balthasar and his daughter Iras are sitting at a fountain in the stadium. Messala's chariot nearly hits them, but Judah intervenes. Balthasar thanks Ben-Hur and presents him with a gift. Judah heads to Sheik Ilderim's tent. The servant Malluch accompanies him, and they talk about the Christ; Malluch relates Balthasar's story of the magi. They realize that Judah saved the man who saw the Christ soon after his birth.

Simonides, his daughter Esther, and Malluch talk together, and conclude that Judah is who he claims to be, and that he is on their side in the fight against Rome. Messala realizes that Judah Ben-Hur has been adopted into a Roman home and his honor has been restored. He threatens to take revenge. Meanwhile, Balthasar and his daughter Iras arrive at the Sheik's tent. With Judah they discuss how the Christ, approaching the age of 30, is ready to enter public leadership. Judah takes increasing interest in the beautiful Iras.

=== Part Five ===
Messala sends a letter to Valerius Gratus about his discovery of Judah, but Sheik Ilderim intercepts the letter and shares it with Judah. He discovers that his mother and sister were imprisoned in a cell at the Antonia Fortress, and Messala has been spying on him. Meanwhile, Ilderim is deeply impressed with Judah's skills with his racing horses and accepts him as his charioteer.

Simonides comes to Judah and offers him the accumulated fortune of the Hur family business, of which the merchant has been steward. Judah Ben-Hur accepts only the original amount of money, leaving the property and the rest to the loyal merchant. They each agree to do their part to fight for the Christ, whom they believe to be a political savior from Roman authority.

A day before the race, Ilderim prepares his horses. Judah appoints Malluch to organize his support campaign for him. Meanwhile, Messala organizes his own huge campaign, revealing Judah Ben-Hur's former identity to the community as an outcast and convict. Malluch challenges Messala and his cronies to a large wager, which, if the Roman loses, would bankrupt him.

The day of the race comes. During the race, Messala and Judah become clear leaders. Messala deliberately scrapes his chariot wheel against Judah's, causing Messala's chariot to break apart. He is trampled by other racers' horses. Judah is crowned the winner and showered with prizes, claiming his first strike against Rome. Messala is left with a broken body and the loss of his wealth.

After the race, Judah Ben-Hur receives a letter from Iras asking him to go to the Roman palace of Idernee. When he arrives, he sees that he has been tricked. Thord, a Saxon hired by Messala, comes to kill Judah. They duel, and Ben-Hur offers Thord 4000 sestertii to let him live. Thord returns to Messala claiming to have killed Judah, so he collects money from them both. Supposedly dead, Judah Ben-Hur goes to the desert with Ilderim to plan a secret campaign.

=== Part Six ===
For Ben-Hur, Simonides bribes Sejanus to remove the prefect Valerius Gratus from his post; Valerius is succeeded by Pontius Pilate. Ben-Hur sets out for Jerusalem to find his mother and sister. Pilate's review of the prison records reveals great injustice, and he notes Gratus concealed a walled-up cell. Pilate's troops reopen the cell to find two women, Judah's long-lost mother and sister, have developed leprosy. Pilate releases them, and they go to the old Hur house, which is vacant. Finding Judah asleep on the steps, they give thanks to God that he is alive, but do not wake him. As lepers, they are considered less than human. Banished from the city, they leave in the morning.

Amrah, the Egyptian maid who once served the Hur house, discovers Ben-Hur and wakes him. She reveals that she has stayed in the Hur house for all these years. Keeping touch with Simonides, she discouraged many potential buyers of the house by acting as a ghost. They pledge to find out more about the lost family. Judah discovers an official Roman report about the release of two leprous women. Amrah hears rumors of the mother and sister's fate.

Romans make plans to use funds from the corban treasury, of the Temple in Jerusalem, to build a new aqueduct. The Jewish people petition Pilate to veto the plan. Pilate sends his soldiers in disguise to mingle with the crowd, who at an appointed time, begin to massacre the protesters. Judah kills a Roman guard in a duel, and becomes a hero in the eyes of a group of Galilean protesters.

=== Part Seven ===
Biblical references: John 1:29–34

At a meeting in Bethany, Ben-Hur and his Galilean followers organize a resistance force to revolt against Rome. Gaining help from Simonides and Ilderim, he sets up a training base in Ilderim's territory in the desert. After some time, Malluch writes announcing the appearance of a prophet believed to be a herald for the Christ. Judah journeys to the Jordan to see the prophet, meeting Balthasar and Iras traveling for the same purpose. They reach Bethabara, where a group has gathered to hear John the Baptist preach. A man walks up to John, and asks to be baptized. Judah recognizes him as the man who gave him water at the well in Nazareth many years before. Balthasar worships him as the Christ.

=== Part Eight ===
Biblical references: Matthew 27:48–51, Mark 11:9–11, 14:51–52, Luke 23:26–46, John 12:12–18, 18:2–19:30

During the next three years, that man, Jesus, preaches his gospel around Galilee, and Ben-Hur becomes one of his followers. He notices that Jesus chooses fishermen, farmers, and similar people, considered "lowly", as apostles. Judah has seen Jesus perform miracles, and is now convinced that the Christ really had come.

During this time, Malluch has bought the old Hur house and renovated it. He invites Simonides and Balthasar, with their daughters, to live in the house with him. Judah Ben-Hur seldom visits, but the day before Jesus plans to enter Jerusalem and proclaim himself, Judah returns. He tells all who are in the house of what he has learned while following Jesus. Amrah realizes that Judah's mother and sister could be healed, and brings them from a cave where they are living. The next day, the three await Jesus by the side of a road and seek his healing. Amid the celebration of his Triumphal Entry, Jesus heals the women. When they are cured, they reunite with Judah.

Several days later, Iras talks with Judah, saying he has trusted in a false hope, for Jesus had not started the expected revolution. She says that it is all over between them, saying she loves Messala. Ben-Hur remembers the "invitation of Iras" that led to the incident with Thord, and accuses Iras of betraying him. That night, he resolves to go to Esther.

While lost in thought, he notices a parade in the street and falls in with it. He notices that Judas Iscariot, one of Jesus' disciples, is leading the parade, and many of the temple priests and Roman soldiers are marching together. They go to the olive grove of Gethsemane, and he sees Jesus walking out to meet the crowd. Understanding the betrayal, Ben-Hur is spotted by a priest who tries to take him into custody; he breaks away and flees. When morning comes, Ben-Hur learns that the Jewish priests have tried Jesus before Pilate. Although originally acquitted, Jesus has been sentenced to crucifixion at the crowd's demand. Ben-Hur is shocked at how his supporters have deserted Christ in his time of need. They head to Calvary, and Ben-Hur resigns himself to watch the crucifixion of Jesus. The sky darkens. Ben-Hur offers Jesus wine vinegar to return Jesus' favor to him, and soon after that Jesus utters his last cry. Judah and his friends commit their lives to Jesus, realizing he was not an earthly king, but a heavenly king and a savior of mankind.

Five years after the crucifixion, Ben-Hur and Esther have married and had children. The family lives in Misenum. Iras visits Esther and tells her she has killed Messala, discovering that the Romans were brutes. She also implies that she will attempt suicide. After Esther tells Ben-Hur of the visit, he tries unsuccessfully to find Iras. A Samaritan uprising in Judaea is harshly suppressed by Pontius Pilate, and he is ordered back to Rome a decade after authorizing the crucifixion of Jesus.

In the 10th year of Emperor Nero's reign, Ben-Hur is staying with Simonides, whose business has been extremely successful. With Ben-Hur, the two men have given most of the fortunes to the church of Antioch. Now, as an old man, Simonides has sold all his ships but one, and that one has returned for probably its final voyage. Learning that the Christians in Rome are suffering at the hands of Emperor Nero, Ben-Hur and his friends decide to help. Ben-Hur, Esther, and Malluch sail to Rome, where they decided to build an underground church. It will survive through the ages and comes to be known as the Catacomb of Callixtus.

== Characters ==
- Judah Ben-Hur is a Jewish prince of Jerusalem who is descended from a royal family of Judaea, son of Ithamar, enslaved by the Romans, and later becomes a charioteer and follower of Christ. (See article Judah Ben-Hur for a discussion of the name etymology.)
- Miriam is the mother of Judah Ben-Hur.
- Tirzah is Judah's younger sister.
- Simonides is a loyal Jewish servant to Ithamar, Judah's birth father; he becomes a wealthy merchant in Antioch.
- Esther, the modest daughter of Simonides, becomes Judah's wife and the mother of his children. Wallace named this fictional character after his own mother, Esther French (Test) Wallace.
- Malluch, Simonides's servant, becomes Judah's friend.
- Amrah is an Egyptian slave and former maid in the Ben-Hur family household.
- Messala is a Roman nobleman and the son of a Roman tax collector; he is Judah's boyhood friend and rival.
- Ishmael – Roman governor
- Valerius Gratus is the fourth imperial (Roman) procurator of Judea. Judah is falsely accused of attempting to assassinate him.
- Quintus Arrius is a Roman warship commander; Judah saves him from drowning; Arrius adopts Judah as his son, making him a freedman, a Roman citizen, and Arrius's heir.
- Balthasar, an Egyptian, is one of the biblical Magi, along with Melchior, a Hindu, and Gaspar, a Greek, who came to Bethlehem to witness the birth of Jesus of Nazareth.
- Iras, the beautiful daughter of Balthasar, is one of Judah's love interests, who later betrays and rejects him; she becomes Messala's mistress and eventually kills him.
- Sheik Ilderim – an Arab who agrees to let Judah race his chariot at Antioch.
- Pontius Pilate replaces Valerius Gratus as procurator (prefect), and releases Judah's mother and sister from imprisonment in a Roman prison.
- Thord is a Northman hired by Messala to kill Judah; he double-crosses Messala and lets Judah live.
- Jesus of Nazareth is the Son of God, the Christ, and King of the Jews; he is the son of Mary.
- Mary is the mother of Jesus and wife of Joseph of Nazareth.
- Joseph of Nazareth is a Jewish carpenter, husband of Mary, and the foster father of Jesus Christ.
- John the Nazarite is a disciple of Christ.

== Major themes ==
Ben-Hur is a tale of vengeance and spiritual forgiveness that includes themes of Christian redemption and God's benevolence through the compassion of strangers. A popular theme with readers during Gilded Age America, when the novel was first published, was the idea of achieving prosperity through piety. In Ben-Hur, this is portrayed through Judah's rise from poverty to great wealth, the challenges he faces to his virtuous nature, and the rich rewards he receives, both materially and spiritually, for his efforts.

== Style ==
Wallace's adventure story is told from the perspective of Judah Ben-Hur. On occasion, the author speaks directly to his readers. Wallace understood that Christians would be skeptical of a fictional story on Christ's life, so he was careful not to offend them in his writing. Ben-Hur "maintains a respect for the underlying principles of Judaism and Christianity". In his memoirs, Wallace wrote:

The Christian world would not tolerate a novel with Jesus Christ its hero, and I knew it ... He should not be present as an actor in any scene of my creation. The giving a cup of water to Ben-Hur at the well near Nazareth is the only violation of this rule ... I would be religiously careful that every word He uttered should be a literal quotation from one of His sainted biographers.

Wallace only used dialogue from the King James Bible for Jesus's words. He also created realistic scenes involving Jesus and the main fictional character of Judah, and included a detailed physical description of the Christ, which was not typical of 19th-century biblical fiction. In Wallace's story, Judah "saw a face he never forgot ... the face of a boy about his own age, shaded by locks of yellowish bright chestnut hair; a face lighted by dark-blue eyes, at the time so soft, so appealing, so full of love and holy purpose, that they had all the power of command and will."

The historical novel is filled with romantic and heroic action, including meticulously detailed and realistic descriptions of its landscapes and characters. Wallace strove for accuracy in his descriptions, including several memorable action scenes, the most famous of which was the chariot race at Antioch. Wallace devoted four pages of the novel to a detailed description of the Antioch arena. Wallace's novel depicts Judah as the aggressive competitor who wrecks Messala's chariot from behind and leaves him to be trampled by horses, in contrast to the 1959 film adaptation of Ben-Hur, where Messala is a villain who cheats by adding spikes to the wheels of his chariot. Wallace's novel explains that the crowd "had not seen the cunning touch of the reins by which, turning a little to the left, he caught Messala's wheel with the iron-shod point of his axle, and crushed it". However, modern research shows that galley slaves were rarely used in the ancient world.

== Background ==
By the time of Ben-Hur's publication in 1880, Wallace had already published his first novel, The Fair God; or, The Last of the 'Tzins (1873), and Commodus: An Historical Play (1876) that was never produced. He went on to publish several more novels and biographies, including The Prince of India; or, Why Constantinople Fell (1893), a biography of President Benjamin Harrison in 1888, and The Wooing of Malkatoon (1898), but Ben-Hur remained his most significant work and best-known novel. Humanities editor Amy Lifson named Ben-Hur as the most influential Christian book of the 19th century, while others have identified it as one of the best-selling novels of all time. Carl Van Doren wrote that Ben-Hur was, along with Uncle Tom's Cabin, the first fiction many Americans read. Wallace's original plan was to write a story of the biblical magi as a magazine serial, which he began in 1873, but he had changed its focus by 1874. Ben-Hur begins with the story of the magi, but the remainder of the novel connects the story of Christ with the adventures of Wallace's fictional character, Judah Ben-Hur.

=== Influences ===
Wallace cited one inspiration for Ben-Hur, recounting his life-changing journey and talk with Colonel Robert G. Ingersoll, a well-known agnostic and public speaker, whom he met on a train when the two were bound for Indianapolis on September 19, 1876. Ingersoll invited Wallace to join him in his railroad compartment during the trip. The two men debated religious ideology, and Wallace left the discussion realizing how little he knew about Christianity. He became determined to do his own research to write about the history of Christ. Wallace explained: "I was ashamed of myself, and make haste now to declare that the mortification of pride I then endured… ended in a resolution to study the whole matter, if only for the gratification there might be in having convictions of one kind or another." When Wallace decided to write a novel based on the life of Christ is not known for certain, but he had already written the manuscript for a magazine serial about the three magi at least two years before his discussions with Ingersoll. Researching and writing about Christianity helped Wallace become clear about his own ideas and beliefs. He developed the novel from his own exploration of the subject.

Ben-Hur was also inspired in part by Wallace's love of romantic novels, including those written by Sir Walter Scott and Jane Porter, and The Count of Monte Cristo (1846) by Alexandre Dumas, père. The Dumas novel was based on the memoirs of an early 19th-century French shoemaker who was unjustly imprisoned and spent the rest of his life seeking revenge. Wallace could relate to the character's isolation of imprisonment. He explained in his autobiography that, while he was writing Ben-Hur, "the Count of Monte Cristo in his dungeon of stone was not more lost to the world."

Other writers have viewed Ben-Hur within the context of Wallace's own life. Historian Victor Davis Hanson argues that the novel drew from Wallace's experiences as a division commander during the American Civil War under General Ulysses S. Grant. Hanson compares Wallace's real-life experience in battle, battle tactics, combat leadership, and jealousies among American Civil War military commanders to those of Wallace's fictional character of Judah, whose unintentional injury to a high-ranking military commander leads to further tragedy and suffering for the Hur family. Wallace made some controversial command decisions, and he delayed arriving on the battlefield during the first day of the Battle of Shiloh, when Grant's Union army sustained heavy casualties. This created a furor in the North, damaged Wallace's military reputation, and drew accusations of incompetence.

John Swansburg, deputy editor of Slate, suggests that the chariot race between the characters of Judah and Messala may have been based on a horse race which Wallace reportedly ran and won against Grant some time after the battle of Shiloh. The Judah character's superior horsemanship helped him beat Messala in a chariot race that earned Judah great wealth. F. Farrand Tuttle Jr., a Wallace family friend, reported the story of the horse race between Grant and Wallace in the Denver News on February 19, 1905, but Wallace never wrote about it. The event may have been a Wallace family legend, but the novel which includes the action-packed chariot race made Wallace a wealthy man and established his reputation as a famous author and sought-after speaker.

=== Research ===
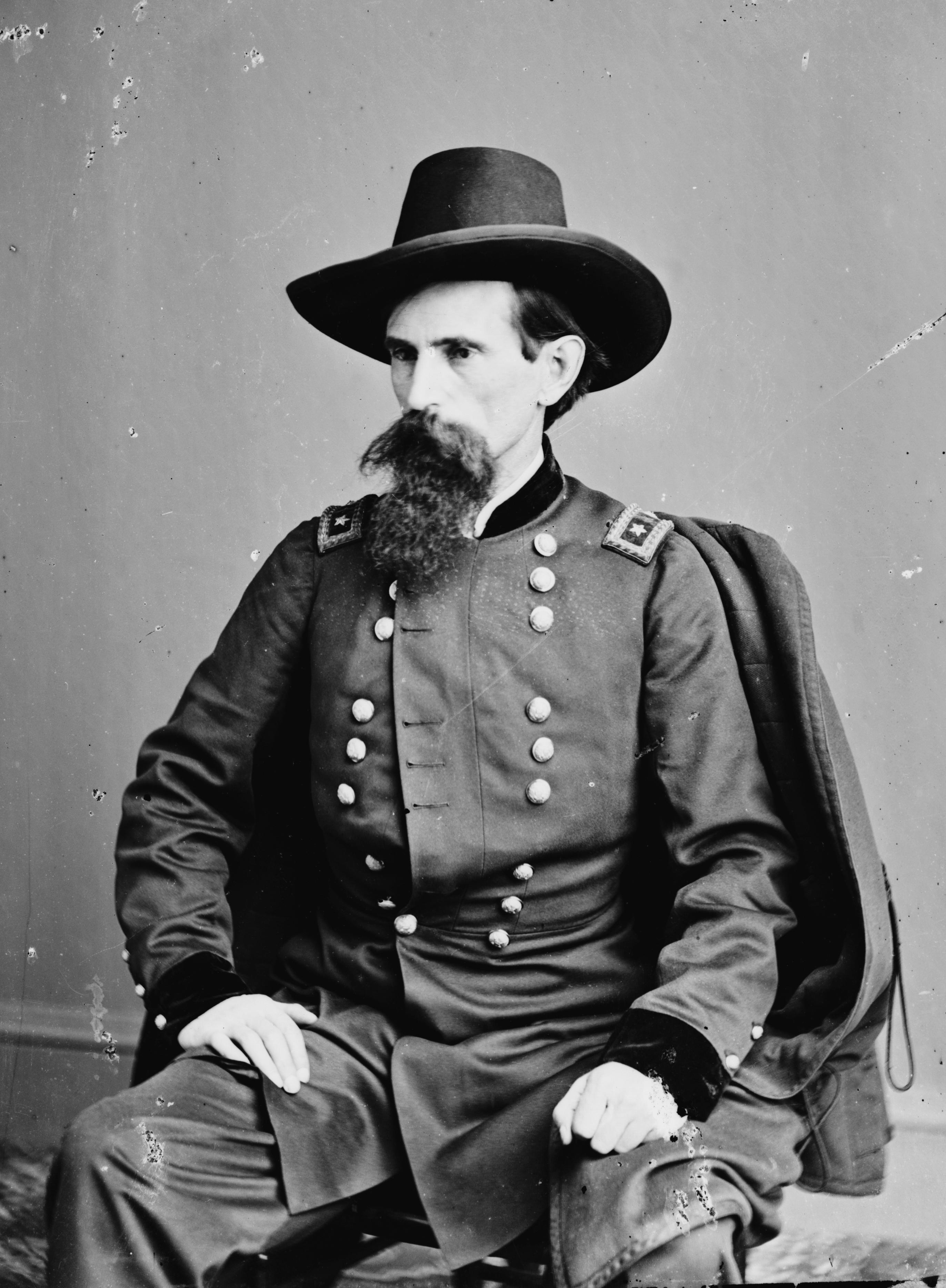
Lew Wallace, Union general, circa 1862–1865

Wallace was determined to make the novel historically accurate and did extensive research on the Middle East that related to the time period covered in his novel. However, he did not travel to Rome or the Holy Land until after its publication. Wallace began research for the story in 1873 at the Library of Congress in Washington, DC, and made several additional research trips to Washington, Boston, and New York.

To establish an authentic background for his story, Wallace gathered references on Roman history, as well as the geography, culture, language, customs, architecture, and daily life in the ancient world from libraries across the United States. He also studied the Bible. Wallace intended to identify the plants, birds, names, architectural practices, and other details. He later wrote: "I examined catalogues of books and maps, and sent for everything likely to be useful. I wrote with a chart always before my eyes—a German publication showing the towns and villages, all sacred places, the heights, the depressions, the passes, trails, and distances." Wallace also recounted traveling to Boston and Washington, DC, to research the exact proportions for the oars of a Roman trireme. Wallace found that his estimations were accurate in the mid-1880s, during a visit to the Holy Land after Ben-Hur was published, and that he could "find no reason for making a single change in the text of the book."

An example of Wallace's attention to detail is his description of the fictional chariot race and its setting at the arena in Antioch. Using a literary style that addressed his audience directly, Wallace wrote:

Let the reader try to fancy it; let him first look down on the arena, and see it glistening in its frame of dull-gray granite walls; let him then, in this perfect field, see the chariots, light of wheel, very graceful, and ornate as paint and burnishing can make them ... let the reader see the accompanying shadows fly; and, with such distinctness as the picture comes, he may share the satisfaction and deeper pleasure of those to whom it was a thrilling fact, not a feeble fancy.

=== Wallace's religious beliefs ===
It is ironic that an acclaimed biblical novel, one that would rival the Bible in popularity during the Gilded Age, was inspired by a discussion with a noted agnostic and written by an author who was never a member of any church. Its publication prompted speculation about Wallace's faith. Wallace claimed that when he began writing Ben-Hur, he was not "in the least influenced by religious sentiment" and "had no convictions about God or Christ", but he was fascinated by the biblical story of the three magi's journey to find Jesus, king of the Jews. After extensive studies of the Bible and the Holy Land, and well before he had completed the novel, Wallace became a believer in God and Christ. In his autobiography, Wallace acknowledged:

In the very beginning, before distractions overtake me, I wish to say that I believe absolutely in the Christian conception of God. As far as it goes, this confession is broad and unqualified, and it ought and would be sufficient were it not that books of mine—Ben-Hur and The Prince of India—have led many persons to speculate concerning my creed ... I am not a member of any church or denomination, nor have I ever been. Not that churches are objectionable to me, but simply because my freedom is enjoyable, and I do not think myself good enough to be a communicant.

== Composition and publication history ==
Most of the book was written during Wallace's spare time in the evening, while traveling, and at home in Crawfordsville, Indiana, where he often wrote outdoors during the summer, sitting under a favorite beech tree near his home. (The tree has since that time been called the Ben-Hur Beech.) Wallace moved to Santa Fe, New Mexico after his appointment as governor of the New Mexico Territory, where he served from August 1878 to March 1881. He completed Ben-Hur in 1880 at the Palace of the Governors in Santa Fe. Wallace wrote mostly at night after his formal duties had concluded, in a room in the palace that was once described in tours as the birthplace of Ben-Hur. In his memoirs, Wallace recalled how he composed the climactic scenes of the Crucifixion by lantern light: "The ghosts, if they were about, did not disturb me; yet in the midst of that gloomy harborage I beheld the Crucifixion, and strove to write what I beheld."

In March 1880, Wallace copied the final manuscript of Ben-Hur in purple ink as a tribute to the Christian season of Lent. He took a leave of absence from his post as New Mexico's territorial governor and traveled to New York City to deliver it to his publisher. On April 20, Wallace personally presented the manuscript to Joseph Henry Harper of Harper and Brothers, who accepted it for publication.

At the time of Ben-Hur's publication, the idea of presenting Christ and the Crucifixion in a fictional novel was a sensitive issue. Wallace's depiction of Christ could have been considered by some as blasphemy, but the quality of his manuscript and his assurances that he had not intended to offend Christians with his writing overcame the publisher's reservations. Harper praised it as "the most beautiful manuscript that has ever come into this house. A bold experiment to make Christ a hero that has been often tried and always failed." Harper and Brothers offered Wallace a contract that would earn him 10% in royalties, and published Ben-Hur on November 12, 1880. It initially sold for $1.50 per copy, an expensive price when compared to other popular novels published at the time.

=== Initial publication ===
When Lew Wallace's Ben-Hur: A Tale of the Christ first appeared in 1880, it was bound in a cadet blue-gray cloth with floral decorations on the front cover, spine, and back cover.

It was copyrighted October 12, 1880, and published November 12 (as noted in a letter to Wallace from Harper dated November 13, 1880). The earliest autographed copy noted bears Wallace's inscription dated November 17, 1880, in the collection of the Indiana Historical Society Library. The first printed review appeared in The New York Times, November 14, 1880, and noted that it is "printed and in the hands of book dealers."

According to Russo and Sullivan, Mrs. Wallace objected to the floral decorative cloth. She wrote to Harper on January 3, 1885, in answer to a question about the true first edition: "I incline to the belief that the volume seen was one of the first issue of Ben-Hur, which would explain the gay binding." (Original letter is in the Eagle Crest Library.) Further, the Harpers Literary Gossip printed an article, "How the First 'Ben-Hur' Was Bound": "Inquiries have reached the Harpers concerning the binding of the first edition of Ben-Hur, which appeared in 1880. The first edition was issued in a series which the Harpers were then publishing. It was 16mo form, bound in cadet-blue cloth, and decorated with clusters of flowers in red, blue, and green on the front cover and a vase of flowers in the same colors on the back cover. The lettering on the cover is black." (Excerpt in the Eagle Crest Library.)

Harpers apparently retaliated at Susan Wallace's objections over the binding. In the next two binding states (all first editions), the text was bound in drab, brown mesh cloth (seen occasionally today as a faded gray) over beveled boards [Binding State 2] and brown pebbled cloth over beveled boards [Binding State 3].

The book is dedicated "To the Wife of My Youth". This dedication appears in the first printing run of about 5,000 copies, all either in the first edition, first state binding, or in two alternate bindings. In an 1887 printing of Ben-Hur at the Rare Books Department of the Cincinnati Public Library, Lew Wallace wrote to Alexander Hill: "My Dear Friend Hill—When Ben-Hur was finished, I told my wife it was to be dedicated to her, and that she must furnish the inscription. She wrote 'To the Wife of My Youth' / The book became popular; then I began to receive letters of sympathy and enquiries as to when and of what poor Mrs. Wallace died. I laughed at first, but the condolences multiplied until finally I told the good woman that having got me into the trouble she must now get me out, which she did by adding the words--'Who still abides with me.' / The device was perfect." Wallace apparently also received many marriage proposals due to the misunderstanding.

=== Sales and subsequent publication ===
Initial sales of Ben-Hur were slow; only 2,800 copies were sold in the first seven months, but within two years, the book had become popular among readers. At the beginning of its third year, 750 copies were sold each month, and by 1885, the monthly average was 1,200 copies. By 1886, the book was earning Wallace about $11,000 in annual royalties, a substantial amount at the time, and began to sell, on average, an estimated 50,000 copies per year. By 1889, Harper and Brothers had sold 400,000 copies. Ten years after its initial publication, the book had reached sustained sales of 4,500 per month. A study conducted in 1893 of American public library book loans found that Ben-Hur had the highest percentage (83%) of loans among contemporary novels. In addition to the publication of the complete novel, two parts were published as separate volumes: The First Christmas (1899) and The Chariot Race (1912).

In 1900, Ben-Hur became the best-selling American novel of the 19th century, surpassing Harriet Beecher Stowe's Uncle Tom's Cabin. By that time it had been printed in 36 English-language editions and translated into 20 other languages, including Indonesian and Braille. Literary historian James D. Hart explained that by the turn of the century, "If every American did not read the novel, almost everyone was aware of it." Between 1880 and 1912, an estimated one million copies of the book were sold, and in 1913, Sears Roebuck ordered another one million copies, at that time the largest single-year print edition in American history, and sold them for 39 cents apiece.

Within 20 years of its publication, Ben-Hur was "second only to the Bible as the best-selling book in America", and remained in second position until Margaret Mitchell's Gone with the Wind (1936) surpassed it. A 1946 edition of Ben-Hur published by Grosset and Dunlap boasted that 26 million copies of the novel were in print. With the release of the 1959 film adaptation of the book, Ben-Hur returned to the top of the bestseller lists in the 1960s. At the time of the book's 100th anniversary in 1980, Ben-Hur had never been out of print and had been adapted for the stage and several motion pictures.

== Reception ==
Ben-Hur was popular in its own day despite slow initial sales and mixed reviews from contemporary literary critics, who "found its romanticism passé and its action pulpy". Century magazine called it an "anachronism" and The Atlantic panned its descriptions as "too lavish". For its readers, however, the book "resonated with some of the most significant issues in late Victorian culture: gender and family; slavery and freedom; ethnicity and empire; and nationhood and citizenship". With the chariot race as its central attraction and the character of Judah emerging as a "heroic action figure", Ben-Hur enjoyed a wide popularity among readers, similar to the dime novels of its day; however, its continued appearance on popular lists of great American literature remained a source of frustration for many literary critics over the years.

The novel had millions of fans, including several influential men in politics. U.S. president and American Civil War general Ulysses S. Grant, U.S. president James Garfield, and Jefferson Davis, former president of the Confederate States of America, were enthusiastic fans. Garfield was so impressed that he appointed Wallace as U.S. Minister to the Ottoman Empire, based in Constantinople, Turkey. Wallace served in this diplomatic post from 1881 to 1885.

Ben-Hur was published at a time when the United States was moving away from war and reconstruction. One scholar argues that Ben-Hur became so popular that it "helped to reunite the nation in the years following Reconstruction". It has been suggested that the Southerners' positive reception of a book written by Wallace, a former Union general, was his message of compassion overcoming vengeance and his sympathetic description of slaveholders. Poet, editor and Confederate veteran Paul Hamilton Hayne described Ben-Hur as "simple, straightforward, but eloquent".

Critics point to problems such as flat characters and dialogue, unlikely coincidences driving the plot, and tedious and lengthy descriptions of settings, but others note its well-structured plot and exciting story, with its unusual mix of romanticism, spiritual piety, action, and adventure. Shortly after Wallace's death, a 1905 entry in the New York Times Saturday Review of Books referred to Ben-Hur as Wallace's masterwork, further noting it "appealed to the unsophisticated and unliterary. People who read much else of worth rarely read Ben-Hur."

Popular novels of Christ's life, such as Reverend J. H. Ingraham's The Prince of the House of David (1855), preceded Wallace's novel, while others such as Charles M. Shedon's "In His Steps": What Would Jesus Do? (1897) followed it, but Ben-Hur was among the first to make Jesus a major character in a novel. Members of the clergy and others praised Wallace's detailed description of the Middle East during Jesus's lifetime and encouraged their congregations to read the book at home and during Sunday School. One Roman Catholic priest wrote to Wallace: "The messiah appears before us as I always wished him depicted."

Readers also credited Wallace's novel with making Jesus's story more believable by providing vivid descriptions of the Holy Land and inserting his own character of Judah into scenes from the gospels. One former alcoholic, George Parrish from Kewanee, Illinois, wrote the author a letter crediting Ben-Hur with causing him to reject alcohol and find religion. Parrish remarked: "It seemed to bring Christ home to me as nothing else could." Others who were inspired by the novel dedicated themselves to Christian service and became missionaries, some of them helping to translate Ben-Hur into other languages. This kind of religious support helped Ben-Hur become one of the best-selling novels of its time. It not only reduced lingering American resistance to the novel as a literary form, but also later adaptations were instrumental in introducing some Christian audiences to theater and film.

== Adaptations ==
=== Stage ===
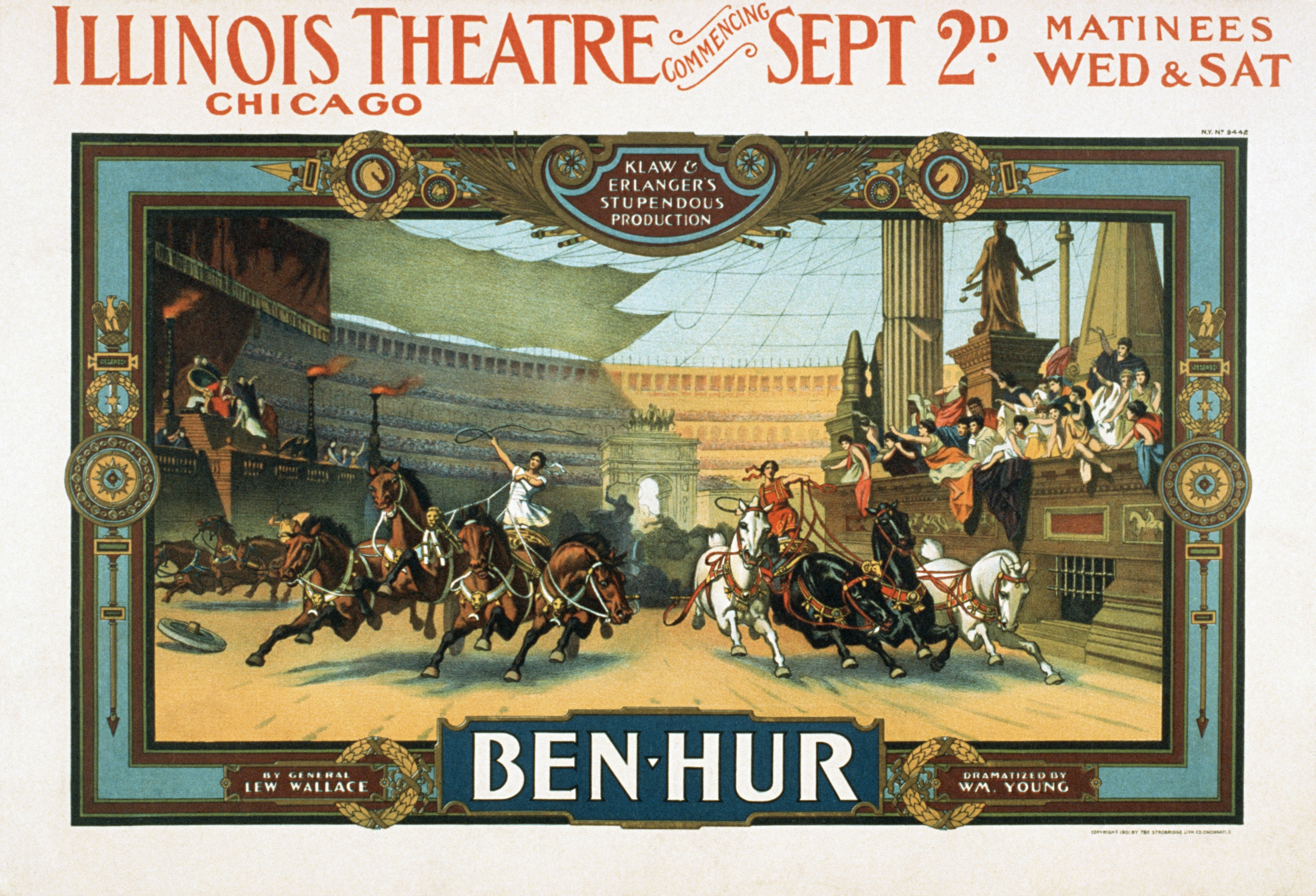
A 1901 poster for a production of the play at the Illinois Theatre, Chicago

After the novel's publication in 1880, Wallace was deluged with requests to dramatize it as a stage play, but he resisted, arguing that no one could accurately portray Christ on stage or recreate a realistic chariot race. Dramatist William Young suggested a solution to represent Jesus with a beam of light, which impressed Wallace. In 1899, Wallace entered into an agreement with theatrical producers Marc Klaw and Abraham Erlanger to turn his novel into a stage adaptation. The resulting play opened at the Broadway Theater in New York City on November 29, 1899. Critics gave it mixed reviews, but the audience packed each performance, many of them first-time theater-goers. It became a hit, selling 25,000 tickets per week. From 1899 until its last performance in 1921, the show played in large venues in U.S. cities such as Boston, Philadelphia, Chicago, and Baltimore, and traveled internationally to London and Sydney and Melbourne, Australia. The stage adaptation was seen by an estimated 20 million people, and William Jennings Bryan claimed it was "the greatest play on stage when measured by its religious tone and moral effect". Its popularity introduced the theater to a new audience, "many of them devout churchgoers who'd previously been suspicious of the stage".

The key spectacle of the show recreated the chariot race with live horses and real chariots running on treadmills with a rotating backdrop. Its elaborate set and staging came at a time "when theatre was yearning to be cinema". After Wallace saw the elaborate stage sets, he exclaimed, "My God. Did I set all of this in motion?"

When the play was produced in London in 1902, The Era's drama critic described how the chariot race was achieved with "four great cradles" 20 feet (6.1 m) long and 14 feet (4.3 m) wide, that moved "back and front on railways", while horses secured with invisible steel cable traces galloped on treadmills towards the audience. The horses also drove the movement of a vast cyclorama backdrop, which revolved in the opposite direction to create an illusion of rapid speed. Electric rubber rollers spun the chariot wheels, while fans created clouds of dust. The production had imported 30 tons of stage equipment from the United States, employed a cast of more than 100, and featured sets with fountains, palm trees, and the sinking of a Roman galley. A critic for The Illustrated London News described the London production in 1902 as "a marvel of stage-illusion" that was "memorable beyond all else", while The Sketch's critic called it "thrilling and realistic ... enough to make the fortune of any play" and noted that "the stage, which has to bear 30 tons' weight of chariots and horses, besides huge crowds, has had to be expressly strengthened and shored up".

In 2009, Ben Hur Live was staged at the O2 arena on the Greenwich peninsula in London. It featured a live chariot race, gladiatorial combat, and a sea battle. The production used 46 horses, 500 tons of special sand, and 400 cast and crew. All of the show's dialogue was in Latin and Aramaic of the period, with voiceover narration. However, despite its massive staging, a critic for The Guardian remarked that it lacked the theatrical spectacle to inspire the imagination of its audience. In contrast, London's Battersea Arts Centre staged a lower-key version of Ben-Hur in 2002 that featured a limited cast of 10 and the chariot race.

In 2017, South Korea adapted it into a musical.

=== Film, radio, and television ===
Full 1925 film; runtime 02:20:52

The development of the cinema following the novel's publication brought film adaptations in 1907, 1925, 1959, 2003, and 2016, as well as television miniseries from North America in 2010 and Brazil in 2026.

In 1907, Sidney Olcott and Frank Oakes Ross directed a short film for the Kalem Company that was based on the book, but it did not have the Wallace heirs' or the book publisher's permissions. The author's son Henry Wallace, stage producers Klaw and Erlanger, and the book's publisher Harper and Brothers sued the film's producers for violating U.S. copyright laws. The landmark case Kalem Co. v. Harper Bros. went to the U.S. Supreme Court in 1911, and set a legal precedent for motion picture rights in adaptations of literary and theatrical works. The court's ruling required the film company to pay $25,000 in damages plus expenses.

Wallace's son continued to receive offers to sell the film rights to the book after his father's death. Henry refused all offers until 1915, when he changed his mind and entered into an agreement with Erlanger for $600,000 ($13.8 million in 2025 dollars). Metro-Goldwyn-Mayer later obtained the film rights. The 1925 film adaptation of Ben-Hur under director Fred Niblo starred Ramon Novarro as Ben-Hur and Francis X. Bushman as Messala. Filming began in Italy and was completed in the United States. It cost MGM $3.9 million ($58 million in 2025 dollars), "making it the most expensive silent film in history". The film premiered on December 30, 1925, at the George M. Cohan Theater in New York City. It received positive reviews and became a top-grossing silent film of the era.

In 1955, MGM began planning for a new version of the film with William Wyler as its director, who had worked as an assistant director of the chariot race in the 1925 film. The 1959 film adaptation of Ben-Hur starred Charlton Heston as Judah, with Stephen Boyd as Messala. It was shot on location in Rome. Filming wrapped up on January 7, 1959, at a cost of an estimated $12.5 to $15 million; it became the most expensive motion picture made up to that time. It was also among the most successful films ever made. The film premiered at Loews State Theater in New York City on November 18, 1959. It earned more than $40 million at the box office and an estimated $20 million more in merchandising revenues.

Wallace's novel was eclipsed by the popularity of Wyler's 1959 film adaptation, a "blockbuster hit for MGM", that won a record 11 Academy awards from the Academy of Motion Picture Arts and Sciences and became the top-grossing film of 1960. Heston won the Oscar for Best Actor, and called it his "best film work"; Wyler won the Academy Award for Best Director. In 1998, the American Film Institute named Wyler's film one of the 100 best American films of all time. The screenplay is credited solely to Karl Tunberg. Christopher Fry and Gore Vidal also made significant contributions during production. Vidal stated that he had added a homoerotic subtext, a claim disputed by Heston.

A BBC Radio 4 dramatization of the book in four parts was first broadcast in the United Kingdom in March–April, 1995, starring Jamie Glover as Ben-Hur, with a cast that included Samuel West and Michael Gambon.

Focus on the Family's Radio Theatre program produced a dramatized version of the story in 2000 using a large cast of well known English actors.

=== Selected film and stage adaptations ===
- Ben-Hur (play) debuted on Broadway in New York City on November 29, 1899.
- Ben Hur (1907 film) is a silent film short.
- Ben-Hur (1925 film) is an MGM silent film starring Ramon Novarro; it premiered in New York City on December 20, 1925.
- Ben-Hur (1959 film) is an MGM sound film starring Charlton Heston; it premiered in New York City on November 18, 1959.
- Ben Hur (2003 film) is an animated direct-to-video film featuring the voice of Charlton Heston
- Ben Hur Live is a 2009 stage adaptation.
- Ben Hur (TV miniseries) is a 2010 adaptation.
- Ben-Hur (2016 film) is a film adaptation for MGM and Paramount Pictures, released worldwide after August 17, 2016.
- Ben-Hur (2026 TV miniseries) is a 2026 adaption produced by Record and Seriella Productions, and distributed by Univer Video, Disney+ (Brazil), and Record TV Network.

=== Books ===
Ben-Hur's success encouraged the publication of other historical romance stories of the ancient world, including G. J. Whyte-Melville's The Gladiators: A Tale of Rome and Judea (1870), Marie Corelli's Barabbas (1901), and Florence Morse Kingsley's Titus, A Comrade of the Cross (1897). In 1884 William Dennes Mahan published The Archko Volume, including Eli's Story of the Magi as a translation of ancient manuscripts. Large portions were copied from Ben-Hur. Other novels adapted Wallace's story: Herman M. Bien's Ben-Beor (1891), J. O. A. Clark's Esther: A Sequel to Ben-Hur (1892), Miles Gerald Keon's Dion and Sibyls (1898), and J. Breckenridge Ellis's Adnah (1902). Esther and other unauthorized uses of Wallace's characters led to court cases initiated by Wallace and his son Henry, to protect authors' copyrights.

At least eight translations of the book into Hebrew were made between 1959 and 1990. Some of these versions have involved wholesale restructuring of the narrative, including changes to character, dropping of Christian themes, and plot.

In 2016, Wallace's great-great-granddaughter, Carol Wallace, published a version of Ben-Hur which was released to coincide with the new film version, using prose for 21st-century readers.

== In popular culture ==
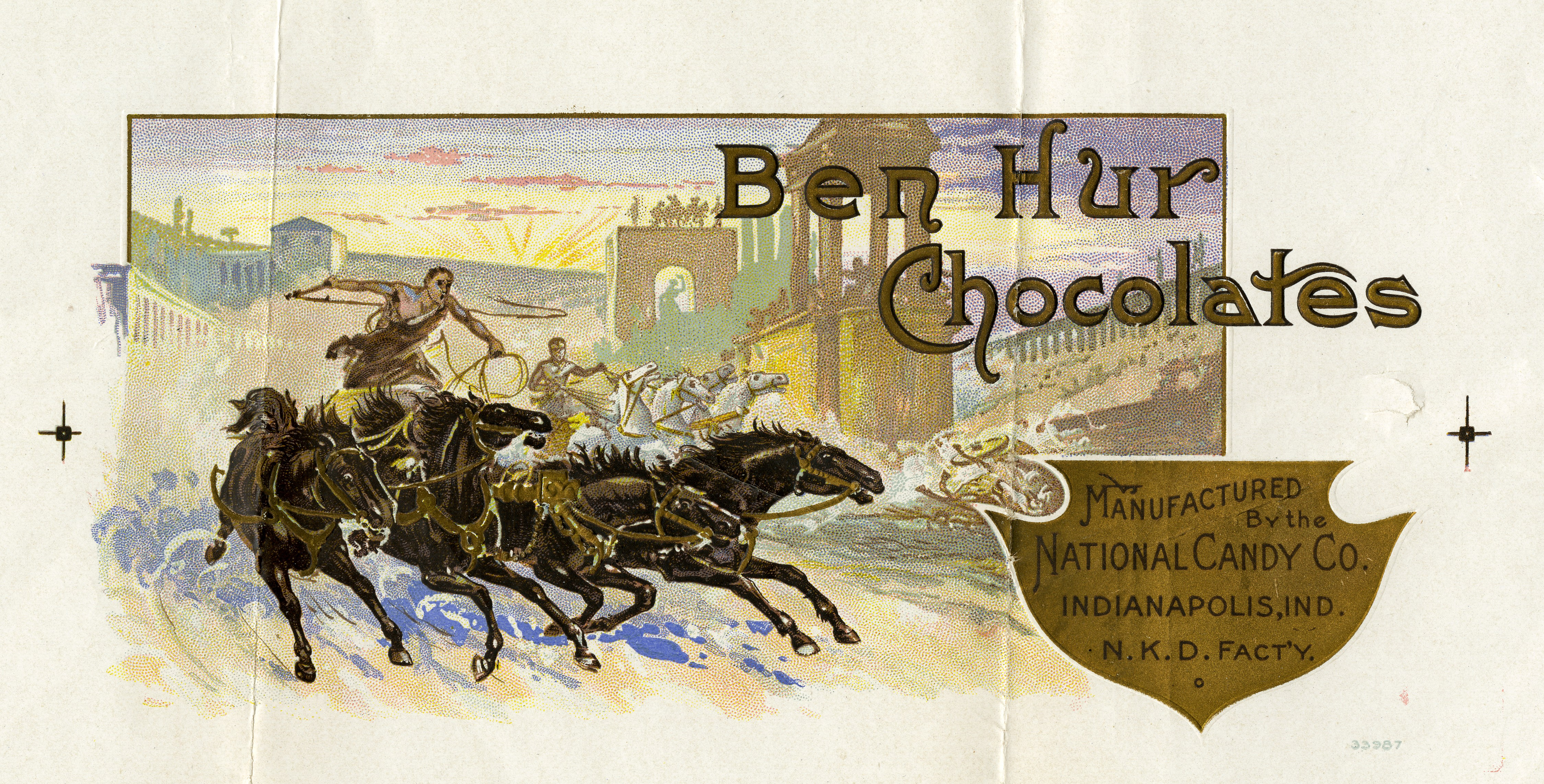
A Ben-Hur chocolate label from 1906

Ben-Hur's success also led to its popularity as a promotional tool and a prototype for popular culture merchandising. It was not the only novel to have related popular culture products, but Wallace and his publisher were the first to legally protect and successfully promote the use of their literary work for commercial purposes. In the decades following its publication, Ben-Hur and its famous chariot race became well-established in popular culture as a "respected, alluring, and memorable" brand name and a recognizable icon that had mass market appeal.

The novel was linked to commercial products that included Ben-Hur flour, produced by the Royal Milling Company of Minneapolis, Minnesota, and a line of Ben-Hur toiletries, including Ben-Hur perfume from the Andrew Jergens Company of Cincinnati, Ohio. Other consumer goods included Ben-Hur bicycles, cigars, automobiles, clocks, and hair products. The Ben-Hur name and images also appeared in magazine advertisements for Honeywell, Ford, and Green Giant products. After MGM released the 1959 film adaptation of the novel, the studio licensed hundreds of companies to create related products, including Ben-Hur-related clothing, household goods, jewelry, food products, crafts, and action figures.

In Alfred Bester's short story "Disappearing Act" (1953), one of the characters, an apparent time traveler, has Ben-Hur among her lovers, which serves as one of the hints the "time travel" is actually a form of reality manipulation.

A character named Ben Gor, a former Galilean slave and chariot racer who is obviously based on Judah Ben-Hur, appears in the final volume of Henry Winterfeld's Caius children's book trilogy, Caius in der Klemme.

== Tributes ==
More than one tribute to Wallace's most famous book and its fictional hero have been erected near Wallace's home in Crawfordsville, Indiana. The General Lew Wallace Study and Museum honors the character of Judah Ben-Hur with a limestone frieze of his imagined face installed over the entrance to the study. Wallace's grave marker at the cemetery in Crawfordsville includes a line from the Balthasar character in Ben-Hur: "I would not give one hour of life as a soul for a thousand years of life as a man."

== See also ==
- Tribe of Ben-Hur – fraternal organization based on the book, known some time later as the Ben-Hur Life Association, an insurance company
