= Ben Hur (miniseries) =

- DVD cover
- Genre: Period drama Adventure
- Based on: Ben-Hur: A Tale of the Christ by Lew Wallace
- Written by: Alan Sharp
- Directed by: Steve Shill
- Starring: Joseph Morgan; Stephen Campbell Moore; Kristin Kreuk; Emily VanCamp
- Composer: Rob Lane
- Countries of origin: United Kingdom; Canada; Spain; United States
- Original language: English
- No. of seasons: 1
- No. of episodes: 2

Production
- Executive producers: Dirk Beinhold; Frank Konigsberg; Michael Prupas; Steve Shill; David Wyler
- Producers: Roger Corbi; Simon Vaughan
- Cinematography: Ousama Rawi
- Editors: Annie Ilkow; Simon Webb
- Running time: 180 minutes

Original release
- Network: CBC
- Release: April 4, 2010

Ben Hur is a television miniseries that first aired in 2010. Based on Lew Wallace's 1880 novel, Ben-Hur: A Tale of the Christ, the series was produced by Alchemy Television Group in association with Drimtim Entertainment and Muse Entertainment in Montreal. It aired on Canada's CBC network on April 4, 2010, and aired later in 2010 on ABC in the United States.

Ben-Hur was directed by Steve Shill, and stars Kristin Kreuk, Ray Winstone, Art Malik, Hugh Bonneville and Joseph Morgan as Judah Ben-Hur. The film was written by Alan Sharp.

== Cast ==
- Joseph Morgan as Judah Ben-Hur / Sextus Arrius, a wealthy Jerusalem merchant.
- Stephen Campbell Moore as Octavius Messala, a Roman officer.
- Emily VanCamp as Esther, Ben Hur's fiancée.
- Kristin Kreuk as Tirzah, Ben Hur's sister.
- Simón Andreu as Simonides, Esther's father.
- Hugh Bonneville as Pontius Pilate, governor of Judaea
- James Faulkner as Marcellus Agrippa, Messala's father
- Alex Kingston as Ruth, Ben Hur's mother.
- Art Malik as Sheik Ilderim, a wealthy Bedouin.
- Marc Warren as David Ben Levi, Ben Hur's overseer.
- Lucía Jiménez as Athene, a Greek courtesan.
- Miguel Ángel Muñoz as Antegua, a galley slave
- Ray Winstone as Quintus Arrius, a Roman admiral.
- Ben Cross as Emperor Tiberius
- Kris Holden-Ried as Gaius Antonius, a Roman officer.
- Michael Nardone as Hortator, galley slave master.
- Julian Casey as Jesus Christ
- Eugene Simon as Young Ben Hur
- Toby Marlow as Young Messala
- Daniella Ereny as Young Tirzah

== Production ==
The miniseries was filmed across various international locations to recreate the ancient world of Judaea and Rome. Its cinematography was led by Ousama Rawi, and its score composed by Rob Lane.

=== Producers ===
- Roger Corbi
- Simon Vaughan

=== Editors ===
- Annie Ilkow
- Simon Webb

== Reception ==
The adaptation received mixed reviews, with some praising its modern interpretation and performances while others critiqued its deviation from the novel and prior adaptations.
