= Judah Ben-Hur =

- Ben-Hur character
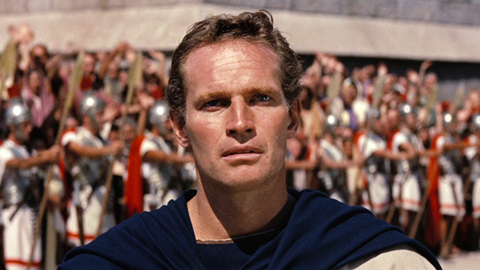
- Charlton Heston as Judah Ben-Hur from Ben-Hur (1959)
- First appearance: A Tale of the Christ (1880, novel)
- Last appearance: Ben-Hur (2016, film)
- Created by: Lew Wallace
- Portrayed by: Ramon Novarro (1925); Charlton Heston (1959); Joseph Morgan (2010); Jack Huston (2016)
- Voiced by: Charlton Heston (2003)

In-universe information
- Aliases: Ben-Hur; Son of Hur; Young Arrius
- Occupation: Prince; Galley Slave; Charioteer
- Family: Miriam (mother); Tirzah (sister)
- Spouse: Esther
- Religion: Judaism, later Christianity

Judah Ben-Hur, shortened to Ben-Hur, is a fictional character, the title character and protagonist from Lew Wallace's 1880 novel Ben-Hur: A Tale of the Christ. The book covers the character's adventures and struggle against the Roman Empire as he tries to restore honor to his family's name after being falsely accused of attacking the Roman governor. Judah encounters Jesus Christ and becomes a follower of Jesus.

== Etymology ==
Wallace wrote that he chose the name Ben-Hur "because it was biblical, and easily spelled, printed and pronounced." The name appears once in the Bible (Hebrew: בן־חור), as the name of one of King Solomon's twelve district governors (1 Kings 4:8). In Hebrew the word "bén" means son. In the King James Version Bible, referring to Solomon's district leaders, he is mentioned as "...the son of Hur", confirming he was 'Judah son of Hur'. The name Hur appears a few times in the Bible, most notably as one of the companions of Moses and Aaron.

== Concept and creation ==
The Count of Monte Cristo was the inspiration for Ben-Hur; the main character Edmond Dantes is falsely accused, escapes his imprisonment and seeks vengeance on those responsible for his imprisonment.

== Fictional character biography ==
Judah Ben-Hur is a Jewish prince of Jerusalem who is descended from a royal family of Judaea; son of Ithamar; enslaved by the Romans and freed by Quintus Arrius, a Roman warship commander, who also adopts Judah as his son. Judah later becomes a trained charioteer intending to defeat Messala as retribution for falsely accusing him and his family of attacking the Roman governor during a military parade earlier on in the book. Messala is Judah's boyhood friend who becomes his rival later in the Sheik Ilderim's chariot at Antioch. Afterwards, Judah becomes a follower of Christ and recognizes him as the man who offered him water as he was being sent to the galleys. He watches him perform miracles, witnesses the crucifixion and realizes that he is a heavenly King, not an earthly king. His encounters with Jesus throughout his journey ultimately change his perspective on life – realizing that forgiveness is more important than revenge. Esther becomes his wife and the mother of his children.

Five years after the chariot race, Judah learns from Iras that she killed Messala. In approximately AD 64 (being the tenth year of Nero's reign), Judah finds out about the suffering of their fellow Christians. He gives his fortune to help construct the Catacomb of Callixtus and an underground church within the catacombs.

== Adaptations ==
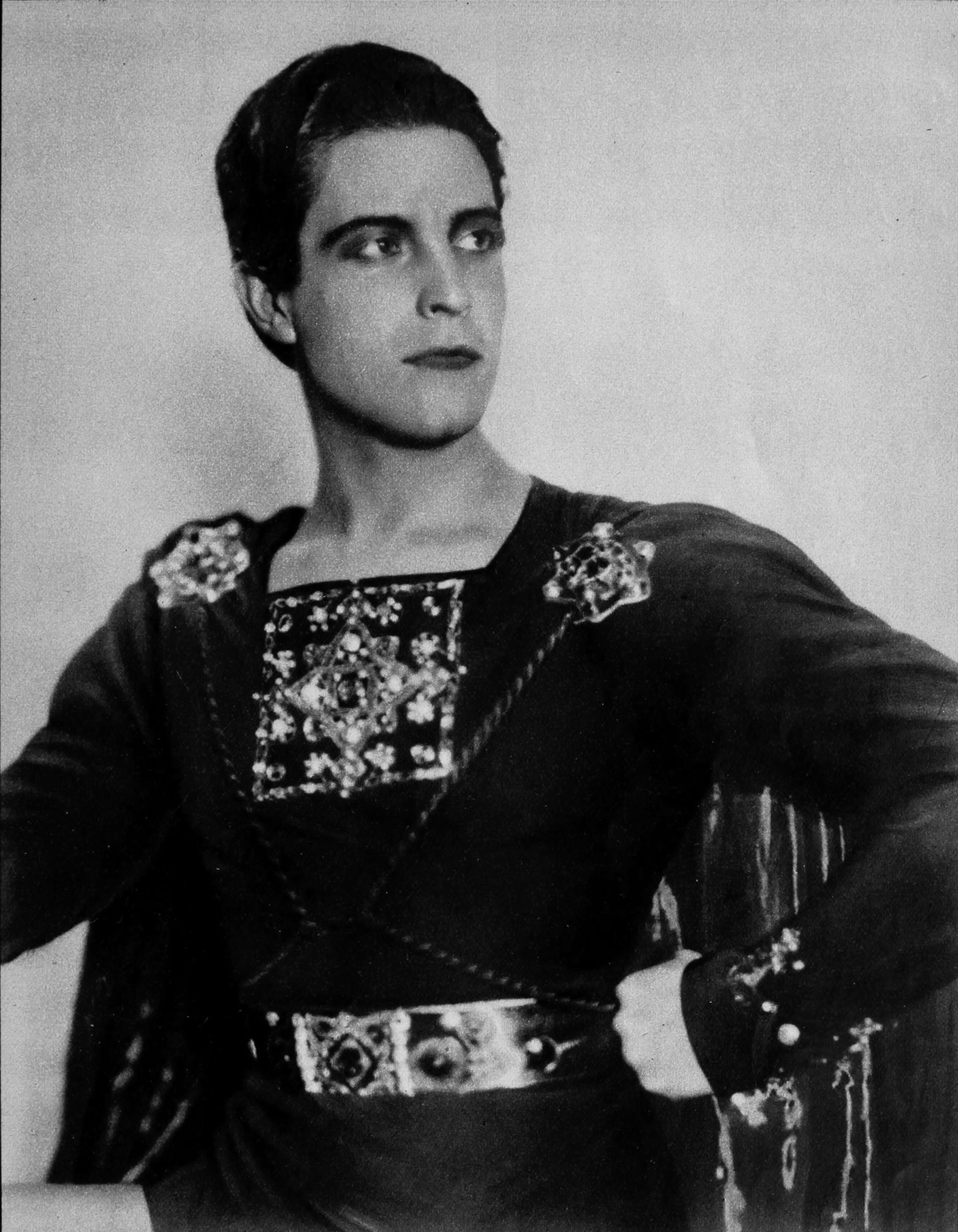
Ramon Novarro as Ben-Hur (1925)

In the 1899 Broadway play, Ben-Hur was portrayed by Edward J. Morgan who replaced Walker Whiteside at the last minute.

In the 1925 silent film, Ben-Hur was portrayed by Ramon Novarro.

In the 1959 film directed by William Wyler, Ben-Hur was played by Charlton Heston, who won the Academy Award for Best Actor. Marlon Brando, Burt Lancaster, Paul Newman and Rock Hudson turned down the role before Heston accepted it. In this version, Ben-Hur becomes a Christian at the crucifixion of Christ; whereas in the book Ben-Hur becomes a Christian earlier. Ben-Hur is given a more bitter personality; Balthazar, one of the three wise men having witnessed the birth of Christ, begs him to listen to the teachings of Jesus but Judah rebuffs him saying that he has business with Rome. Blaming Rome for destroying the once good Messala (prior to his corruption) and what has happened to his family, Judah refuses to have anything more to do the Empire and asks Pilate to return his ring to his adoptive father, Quintus Arrius. In contrast with the book, while witnessing the crucifixion, Judah comes to realize that forgiveness is better than vengeance, feeling Jesus' voice taking the sword of anger and hatred out of his hand.

Heston reprised his role in the 2003 animated film. Although this version is similar to the 1959 film, some differences include Ben-Hur, his family, Balthazar and a redeemed Messala witnessing the crucifixion together.

Judah Ben-Hur also appears in the Back to the Future animated series episode "Roman Holiday".

On stage, Ben-Hur was portrayed by actor Sebastian Thrun, in the 2009 stage adaptation Ben Hur Live at O2 Arena in London.

In the 2010 television miniseries, Ben-Hur was played by Joseph Morgan.

The character was portrayed by Jack Huston in the 2016 film.

In contrast with the novel most of the adaptations end with Judah being reunited with Miriam and Tirzah. The aftermath and his marriage to Esther is also not part of some of the adaptations’ plot with the exception of the 2003 animated film, where Judah shares with his children his adventures and faith in Jesus.
