= List of United States Supreme Court cases, volume 222 =

Supreme Court of the United States
- Interactive map of Supreme Court of the United States
- 38°53′26″N 77°00′16″W
- Established: March 4, 1789; 237 years ago
- Location: Washington, D.C.
- Coordinates: 38°53′26″N 77°00′16″W
- Composition method: Presidential nomination with Senate confirmation
- Authorised by: Constitution of the United States, Art. III, § 1
- Judge term length: life tenure, subject to impeachment and removal
- Number of positions: 9 (by statute)
- Website: supremecourt.gov

This is a list of cases reported in volume 222 of United States Reports, decided by the Supreme Court of the United States in 1911 and 1912.

== Justices of the Supreme Court at the time of volume 222 U.S. ==
The Supreme Court is established by Article III, Section 1 of the Constitution of the United States, which says: "The judicial Power of the United States, shall be vested in one supreme Court . . .". The size of the Court is not specified; the Constitution leaves it to Congress to set the number of justices. Under the Judiciary Act of 1789 Congress originally fixed the number of justices at six (one chief justice and five associate justices). Since 1789 Congress has varied the size of the Court from six to seven, nine, ten, and back to nine justices (always including one chief justice).

When the cases in volume 222 were decided the Court comprised the following eight members (following the death of Justice John Marshall Harlan):

Portrait	Justice	Office	Home State	Succeeded	Date confirmed by the Senate (Vote)	Tenure on Supreme Court
	Edward Douglass White	Chief Justice	Louisiana	Melville Fuller	December 12, 1910 (Acclamation)	December 19, 1910 – May 19, 1921 (Died)
	Joseph McKenna	Associate Justice	California	Stephen Johnson Field	January 21, 1898 (Acclamation)	January 26, 1898 – January 5, 1925 (Retired)
	Oliver Wendell Holmes Jr.	Associate Justice	Massachusetts	Horace Gray	December 4, 1902 (Acclamation)	December 8, 1902 – January 12, 1932 (Retired)
	William R. Day	Associate Justice	Ohio	George Shiras Jr.	February 23, 1903 (Acclamation)	March 2, 1903 – November 13, 1922 (Retired)
	Horace Harmon Lurton	Associate Justice	Tennessee	Rufus W. Peckham	December 20, 1909 (Acclamation)	January 3, 1910 – July 12, 1914 (Died)
	Charles Evans Hughes	Associate Justice	New York	David Josiah Brewer	May 2, 1910 (Acclamation)	October 10, 1910 – June 10, 1916 (Resigned)
	Willis Van Devanter	Associate Justice	Wyoming	Edward Douglass White (as Associate Justice)	December 15, 1910 (Acclamation)	January 3, 1911 – June 2, 1937 (Retired)
	Joseph Rucker Lamar	Associate Justice	Georgia	William Henry Moody	December 15, 1910 (Acclamation)	January 3, 1911 – January 2, 1916 (Died)

== Citation style ==
Under the Judiciary Act of 1789 the federal court structure at the time comprised District Courts, which had general trial jurisdiction; Circuit Courts, which had mixed trial and appellate (from the US District Courts) jurisdiction; and the United States Supreme Court, which had appellate jurisdiction over the federal District and Circuit courts—and for certain issues over state courts. The Supreme Court also had limited original jurisdiction (i.e., in which cases could be filed directly with the Supreme Court without first having been heard by a lower federal or state court). There were one or more federal District Courts and/or Circuit Courts in each state, territory, or other geographical region.

The Judiciary Act of 1891 created the United States Courts of Appeals and reassigned the jurisdiction of most routine appeals from the district and circuit courts to these appellate courts. The Act created nine new courts that were originally known as the "United States Circuit Courts of Appeals." The new courts had jurisdiction over most appeals of lower court decisions. The Supreme Court could review either legal issues that a court of appeals certified or decisions of court of appeals by writ of certiorari.

On January 1, 1912, the effective date of the Judicial Code of 1911, the old Circuit Courts were abolished, with their remaining trial court jurisdiction transferred to the U.S. District Courts.

Bluebook citation style is used for case names, citations, and jurisdictions.

- "# Cir." = United States Court of Appeals
  - e.g., "3d Cir." = United States Court of Appeals for the Third Circuit
- "C.C.D." = United States Circuit Court for the District of . . .
  - e.g.,"C.C.D.N.J." = United States Circuit Court for the District of New Jersey
- "D." = United States District Court for the District of . . .
  - e.g.,"D. Mass." = United States District Court for the District of Massachusetts
- "E." = Eastern; "M." = Middle; "N." = Northern; "S." = Southern; "W." = Western
  - e.g.,"C.C.S.D.N.Y." = United States Circuit Court for the Southern District of New York
  - e.g.,"M.D. Ala." = United States District Court for the Middle District of Alabama
- "Ct. Cl." = United States Court of Claims
- The abbreviation of a state's name alone indicates the highest appellate court in that state's judiciary at the time.
  - e.g.,"Pa." = Supreme Court of Pennsylvania
  - e.g.,"Me." = Supreme Judicial Court of Maine

== List of cases in volume 222 U.S. ==
Case Name	Page & year	Opinion of the Court	Concurring opinion(s)	Dissenting opinion(s)	Lower Court	Disposition
Blinn v. Nelson	1 (1911)	Holmes	none	none	Mass.	affirmed
United States v. Baltimore et al. R.R. Co.	8 (1911)	McKenna	none	none	S.D. Ohio	affirmed
United States v. Plyler	15 (1911)	Holmes	none	none	W.D.N.C.	reversed
Virginia v. West Virginia	17 (1911)	Holmes	none	none	original	continued
Southern R.R. Co. v. United States	20 (1911)	VanDevanter	none	none	N.D. Ala.	affirmed
Finley v. California	28 (1911)	McKenna	none	none	Cal.	affirmed
Helm v. Zarecor	32 (1911)	Hughes	none	none	C.C.M.D. Tenn.	reversed
Troy Bank v. G.A. Whitehead & Co.	39 (1911)	VanDevanter	none	none	C.C.W.D. Ky.	reversed
ICC v. Diffenbaugh	42 (1911)	Holmes	none	McKenna	C.C.W.D. Mo.	affirmed
Lenman v. Jones	51 (1911)	Holmes	none	none	D.C. Cir.	affirmed
Kalem Co. v. Harper Bros.	55 (1911)	Holmes	none	none	2d Cir.	affirmed
Southern P. Co. v. Kentucky	63 (1911)	Lurton	none	none	Ky.	affirmed
Curtin v. Benson	78 (1911)	McKenna	none	none	C.C.N.D. Cal.	reversed
Hussey v. United States	88 (1911)	McKenna	none	none	Ct. Cl.	affirmed
Richardson v. Harmon	96 (1911)	Lurton	none	none	N.D. Ohio	reversed
Bryan v. Ker	107 (1911)	VanDevanter	none	none	4th Cir.	reversed
T. Weller & Co. v. Munsuri	114 (1911)	White	none	none	D.P.R.	dismissed
Munsuri v. Fricker	121 (1911)	White	none	none	D.P.R.	dismissed
Enriquez v. Enriquez I	123 (1911)	White	none	none	Phil.	dismissed
Enriquez v. Enriquez II	127 (1911)	White	none	none	Phil.	dismissed
United States v. Eckstein	130 (1911)	White	none	none	2d Cir.	affirmed
Glickstein v. United States	139 (1911)	White	none	none	5th Cir.	certification
Ripley v. United States	144 (1911)	White	none	none	Ct. Cl.	remanded
Grigsby v. Russell	149 (1911)	Holmes	none	none	6th Cir.	reversed
United States v. Fidelity T. Co.	158 (1911)	Holmes	none	none	Ct. Cl.	reversed
Sandoval v. Randolph	161 (1911)	Lurton	none	none	Sup. Ct. Terr. Ariz.	affirmed
Anderson v. United R. Co.	164 (1911)	Lurton	none	none	Ohio	affirmed
United States v. Stever	167 (1911)	Lurton	none	none	W.D. Ky.	affirmed
United States v. Munday	175 (1911)	Lurton	none	none	C.C.W.D. Wash.	reversed
Missouri et al. R.R. Co. v. City of Olathe I	185 (1911)	Hughes	none	none	Kan.	dismissed
Missouri et al. R.R. Co. v. City of Olathe II	187 (1911)	Hughes	none	none	Kan.	dismissed
Missouri et al. R.R. Co. v. City of Olathe III	191 (1911)	Hughes	none	none	Kan.	dismissed
Martin v. West	191 (1911)	VanDevanter	none	none	Wash.	affirmed
United States v. Congress C. Co.	199 (1911)	VanDevanter	none	none	C.C.N.D. Ill.	affirmed
United States ex rel. Turner v. Fisher	204 (1911)	Lamar	none	none	D.C. Cir.	affirmed
Banker Bros. Co. v. Pennsylvania	210 (1911)	Lamar	none	none	Pa. Super. Ct.	affirmed
Union P.R.R. Co. v. Updike Grain Co.	215 (1911)	Lamar	none	none	8th Cir.	affirmed
Chicago J.R.R. Co. v. King	222 (1911)	White	none	none	7th Cir.	affirmed
Mutual L. Co. v. Martell	225 (1911)	McKenna	none	none	Mass. Super. Ct.	affirmed
Union P.R.R. Co. v. Mason City et al. R.R. Co.	237 (1911)	McKenna	none	none	C.C.D. Neb.	reversed
Aluminum Co. v. Ramsey	251 (1911)	McKenna	none	none	Ark.	affirmed
United States v. Garbish	257 (1911)	McKenna	none	none	C.C.E.D. La.	reversed
Consaul v. Cummings	262 (1911)	Lamar	none	none	D.C. Cir.	affirmed
United States v. Morgan	274 (1911)	Lamar	none	none	C.C.S.D.N.Y.	reversed
United States ex rel. Kinney v. United States F. & G. Co.	283 (1911)	White	none	none	3d Cir.	affirmed
Lewers & Cooke, Ltd. v. Atcherly	285 (1911)	Holmes	none	none	Sup. Ct. Terr. Haw.	affirmed
Mayer v. American S. & T. Co.	295 (1911)	Holmes	none	none	D.C. Cir.	affirmed
Acme H. Co. v. Beekman L. Co.	300 (1911)	Day	none	none	Mo.	affirmed
City of Chicago v. Sturges	313 (1911)	Lurton	none	none	Ill.	affirmed
Brown v. Alton W. Co.	325 (1912)	White	none	none	C.C.S.D. Ill.	dismissed
Berryman v. Whitman Coll.	334 (1912)	White	none	none	C.C.E.D. Wash.	reversed
Rock Island P. Co. v. Reardon	354 (1912)	White	none	none	7th Cir.	affirmed
Gring v. Ives	365 (1912)	White	none	none	N.C.	dismissed
Northern P.R.R. Co. v. Washington ex rel. Atkinson	370 (1912)	White	none	none	Wash.	reversed
Red "C" O. Mfg. Co. v. Board of Agric.	380 (1912)	White	none	none	C.C.E.D.N.C.	affirmed
Aran v. Zurrinach	395 (1912)	White	none	none	D.P.R.	dismissed
Title G. & S. Co. v. United States ex rel. GE	401 (1912)	White	none	none	3d Cir.	supersedeas vacated
Vogt v. Graff	404 (1912)	McKenna	none	none	D.C. Cir.	affirmed
Williams v. Walsh	415 (1912)	McKenna	none	none	Kan.	affirmed
Southern R.R. Co. v. Reid I	424 (1912)	McKenna	none	none	N.C.	reversed
Southern R.R. Co. v. Reid II	444 (1912)	McKenna	none	none	N.C.	reversed
Treat v. Grand Canyon R.R. Co.	448 (1912)	Holmes	none	none	Sup. Ct. Terr. Ariz.	affirmed
Gandia v. Pettingill	452 (1912)	Holmes	none	none	D.P.R.	reversed
United States v. McMullen	460 (1912)	Holmes	none	none	9th Cir.	reversed
Cuba R.R. Co. v. Crosby	473 (1912)	Holmes	none	none	3d Cir.	reversed
Porto Rico S. Co. v. Lorenzo	481 (1912)	Holmes	none	none	D.P.R.	affirmed
Peters v. Broward	483 (1912)	Lurton	none	none	C.C.N.D. Fla.	affirmed
Huse v. United States	496 (1912)	Lurton	none	none	Ct. Cl.	affirmed
Robinson v. Baltimore & O.R.R. Co.	506 (1912)	VanDevanter	none	none	W. Va.	affirmed
United States v. Barnes	513 (1912)	VanDevanter	none	none	W.D. Ky.	reversed
Soliah v. Heskin	522 (1912)	Lamar	none	none	N.D. Dist. Ct.	affirmed
Keeney v. New York	525 (1912)	Lamar	none	none	Kings Cnty. Sur. Ct.	affirmed
Johnson v. Collier	538 (1912)	Lamar	none	none	Ala.	affirmed
Interstate Commerce Commission v. Union P.R.R. Co.	541 (1912)	Lamar	none	none	C.C.D. Minn.	reversed
Fitz Gerald v. Thompson	555 (1912)	White	none	none	Pa.	dismissed
Herrera v. United States	558 (1912)	McKenna	none	none	Ct. Cl.	affirmed
Diaz v. United States	574 (1912)	McKenna	none	none	Ct. Cl.	affirmed
Omaha et al. Ry. Co. v. Interstate Commerce Commission	582 (1911)	per curiam	none	none	Comm. Ct.	continued

== See also ==
- Certificate of division
