= Ben Hur (1907 film) =

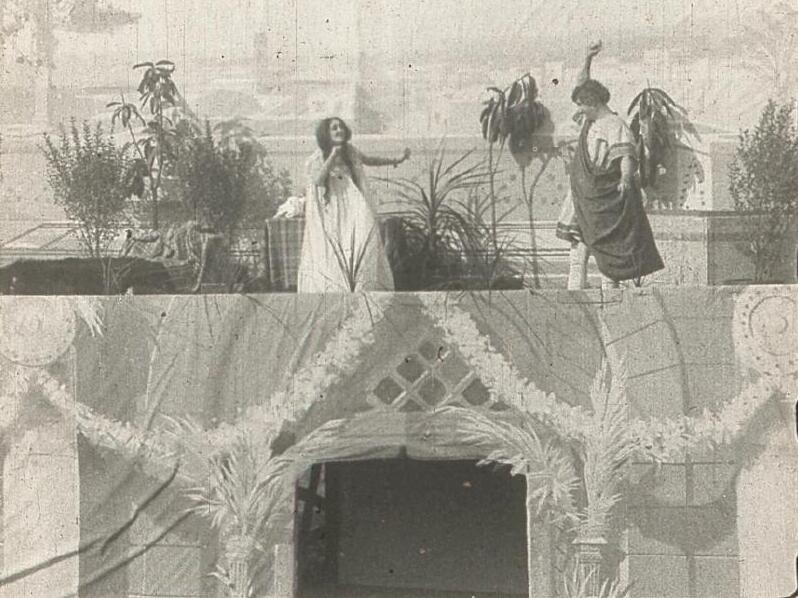
- Scene of Judah Ben-Hur (right) discussing with his sister Rome's misrule of Jerusalem
- Directed by: Sidney Olcott; Frank Oakes Rose
- Written by: Scenario by Gene Gauntier
- Based on: Ben-Hur: A Tale of the Christ; 1880 novel by Lew Wallace
- Produced by: Frank J. Marion; George Kleine; Samuel Long
- Cinematography: Max Schneider
- Music by: Edgar Stillman Kelley (accompanying sheet music for film)
- Production companies: Kalem Company; New York, N.Y.
- Distributed by: Kalem Company
- Release date: December 7, 1907
- Running time: 15 minutes ("Approximate Length" 1000 feet)
- Country: United States
- Languages: Silent (English intertitles)

Ben Hur is a 1907 American silent drama film set in ancient Rome, the first screen adaptation of Lew Wallace's popular 1880 novel Ben-Hur: A Tale of the Christ. Co-directed by Sidney Olcott and Frank Oakes Rose, this "photoplay" was produced by the Kalem Company of New York City, and its scenes, including the climactic chariot race, were filmed in the city's borough of Brooklyn. (Note: In Kalem's promotion of the film in 1907 and 1908, Frank Oakes Rose is consistently given "front" billing in credits for the production's direction with Sidney Olcott. In 1907 Rose, as noted, was a stage manager for Pain's Fireworks Company, and no available documentation from that period states or indicates that he had any experience in directing films.)

While this film is significant for being the first motion-picture adaptation of Wallace's novel, its production also served as a landmark case of copyright infringement by an early American film studio. In 1908 Kalem was successfully sued for representing parts of Wallace's book on screen without obtaining permission from the author's estate. Copies of the film, which survive, are now in the public domain and are readily available for free viewing online in the collections of various digital archives and on streaming services.

== Plot ==
Play a copy of film with an opening introduction.

With an original total running time of just 15 minutes, Kalem's "Roman Spectacle" only highlights some of the principal events described in the novel, although notably excluding Judah Ben-Hur's encounters with Jesus Christ or his presence at Christ's crucifixion. The film company in its advertising in 1907 describes the release being composed of "Sixteen Magnificent Scenes" with intertitles introducing screen presentations such as "Jerusalem Rebels Against Roman Mis-rule", "The Family of Hur", "Ben Hur in Chains to the Galleys", and "Ben Hur and Messala—The Challenge".

A significant portion of the film's latter content is devoted to portraying the story's chariot race. Just four chariots, including those driven by Ben-Hur and Messala, are depicted, with each being drawn by teams of four black horses. Virtually all of the contest's action is implied visually, occurring off-camera, and not shown to viewers of the film. (Note: According to Emily Chow-Kambitsch's article cited in this page's references "Of the roughly one minute and ten second duration of the chariot race, the chariots are only visible for about fifteen seconds—about twenty per cent of the time.") Roman spectators on screen cheer as they pretend to watch the charioteers racing three laps around the track of the Circus Maximus. Only brief footage shows the contestants speeding by the static camera as their vehicles are supposedly completing each of the laps. After Judah wins the race against Messala and the two other competitors, the intertitle "Ben Hur Victor" appears. The film then ends with spectators continuing to cheer; Judah being awarded a laurel wreath by the emperor; and Messala, who was injured during the race, lying on a stretcher and gesturing toward his former friend.

== Cast ==
- Herman Rottjer as "Chief Chariotier" [sic] and possibly as Judah Ben-Hur
- William S. Hart as Messala (uncredited and unverified involvement in film)
- Gene Gauntier in unverified role
- Harry T. Morey in unverified role
- Beal (or Peal), Sheridan, and Matler as other "Drivers" in chariot race (Note: Advertisements for the film in trade publications on December 7, 1907 cite three of the drivers in the chariot race, although publications differ on the spelling of the surname of one; The Billboard cites "Peal" and The Moving Picture World cites "Beal".)

== Production ==
The production was directed principally by Sidney Olcott with assistance from Frank Oakes Rose, a stage manager with Henry J. Pain's Fireworks Company, an entertainment business at Manhattan Beach in Brooklyn, New York. Filmed outdoors in the October 1907, the project was shot in just four days with the production crew mindful that the region's "fall rains might begin at any time".

=== The lead actors ===
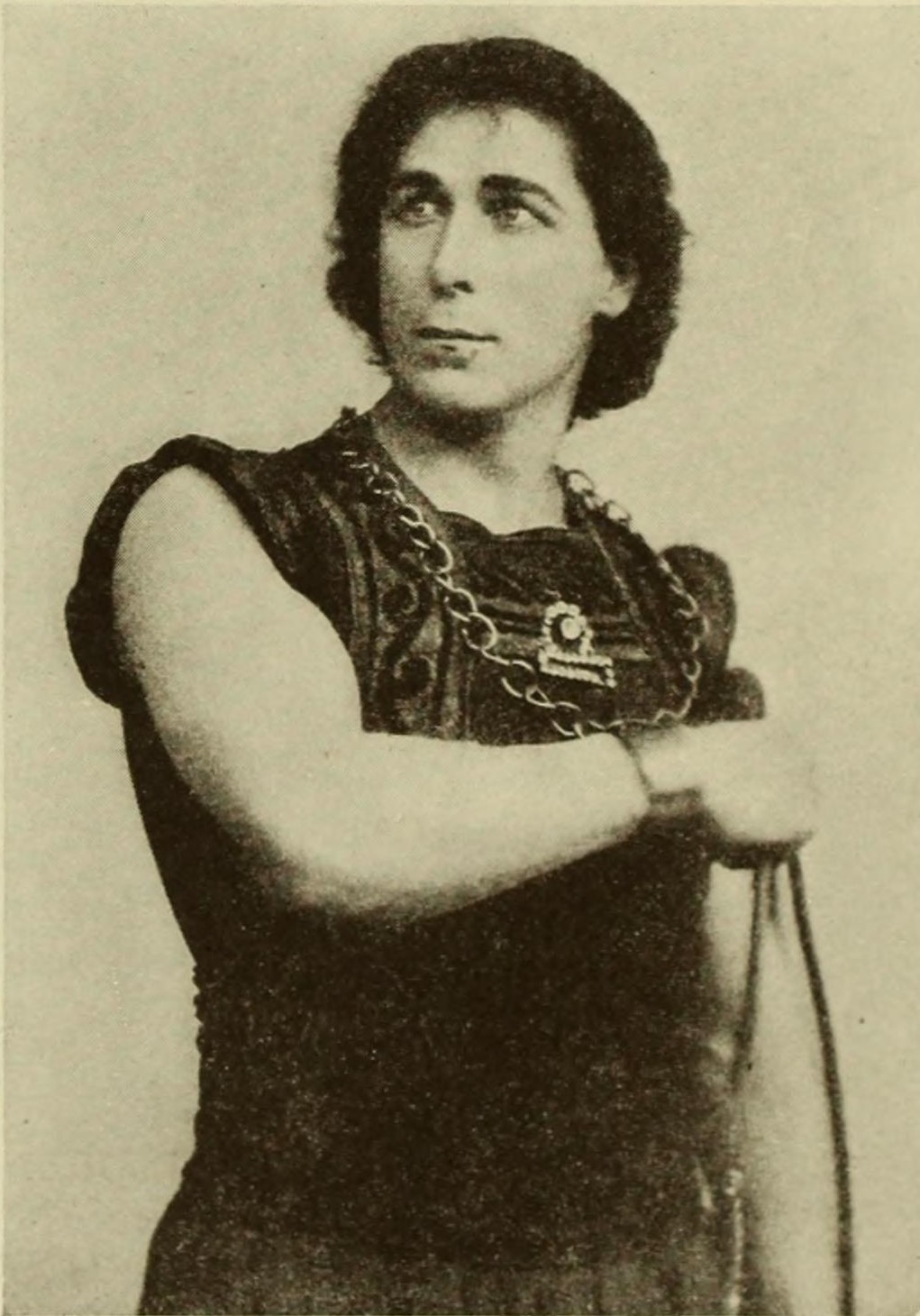
William S. Hart's casting in the film remains unverified. This image likely relates to promotion of his many performances as Messala in the 1899-1900 Broadway production of Ben Hur.

Actor William S. Hart, who would later become the silent era's foremost star of "cowboy pictures", allegedly reprised his role as Messala in Kalem's production, having already played the part on stage in the highly successful Broadway production of Ben Hur, which ran for 194 performances between late November 1899 and May 1900. His participation in this film, however, remains unverified from period records and is therefore suspect as fact. It appears that Hart's well-documented work in the earlier Broadway adaptation of Wallace's novel became erroneously linked to the 1907 short. If Hart were indeed cast in the film, it is surprising that Kalem in its advertising did not widely promote the presence of an established Broadway actor in the motion picture, especially a veteran of a Ben Hur production in the "legitimate" theatre.

With regard to the identity of the actor who performed in the film's title role, misinformation and confusion also persist in modern sources. Many of those sources cite a professional film actor, "Herman Rottger", as Ben-Hur in Kalem’s production. Actually, only one verified cast member in the 1907 production, one who possessed a nearly identical name—"Herman Rottjer"—was an employee with Pain's Fireworks Company. That entertainment company on summer nights since 1879 had staged for audiences at a "massive outdoor stadium and lake at Manhattan Beach" spectacular pyrotechnic displays to simulate famous battles, revolutions, historic fires, and natural disasters such as the volcanic eruption of Mount Vesuvius in 79 AD and its destruction of the Roman town of Pompeii. In the early 1900s, Pain's live pyrodramas included elaborate sets of Roman architecture and staged chariot races.

In Kalem’s large advertisement for Ben Hur in the December 7, 1907 issue of the trade journal The Moving Picture World, the studio credits Rottjer as the "Chief Chariotier" in the film. That credit certainly suggests Rottjer, who was 29 years old at the time, had considerable experience driving Pain's replicas of the two-wheeled ancient vehicles, along with experience performing in Pain's summer Vesuvius-Pompeii shows and in other grand productions staged by the company. (Note: The United States Census of 1910 for Brooklyn documents Herman Rottjer's age that year as 32.) His chariot and show experience made him an ideal choice to act or "pantomime" in the role of the lead character in Kalem's short. Although Rottjer would continue to work for Pain's for several years after the film's release, he would later establish a career in the film industry. Federal census records show that in 1910 the German-born Rottjer continued to reside in Brooklyn with his wife and three daughters and was still employed at the local "Firework Plant", presumably Pain's; however, by 1917 he was working as an "explosion expert" in Brooklyn for Vitagraph Studios, which that year purchased Kalem Company. Contrary to information given in other sources, Rottjer did not die in 1917. Later census records further document that by 1920 he had moved with his family to Hempstead in Nassau County, New York, but he was still employed in the motion-picture industry as a "Pyrotechnical" specialist.

=== Filming at Sheepshead Bay Race Track ===
Although Kalem initially planned to use props and "standing scenery" from Pain's, the studio acquired most of its production needs elsewhere and opted, perhaps due to budget and scheduling constraints, to film the project's chariot race and other scenes at the Sheepshead Bay Race Track, which was located close to Manhattan Beach. The track by October 1907 was closed for the season and was immediately available for Kalem to use. The film's credited screenwriter or "scenarist", Gene Gauntier, described the film's setup in her series of autobiographical articles for Woman's Home Companion in 1928:

Mr. Olcott and I went to the racetrack, found the [Pain's] props impossible and the supers [extras] inadequate, hurried back to Swain's Agency and interviewed people for the cast and extras, and late in the evening rushed down to Elliott's and remained there until after midnight selecting props and hundreds of costumes. In five days after the idea was conceived we were at Sheepshead Bay taking the first scenes. In three days more it was finished and in the developing tanks.

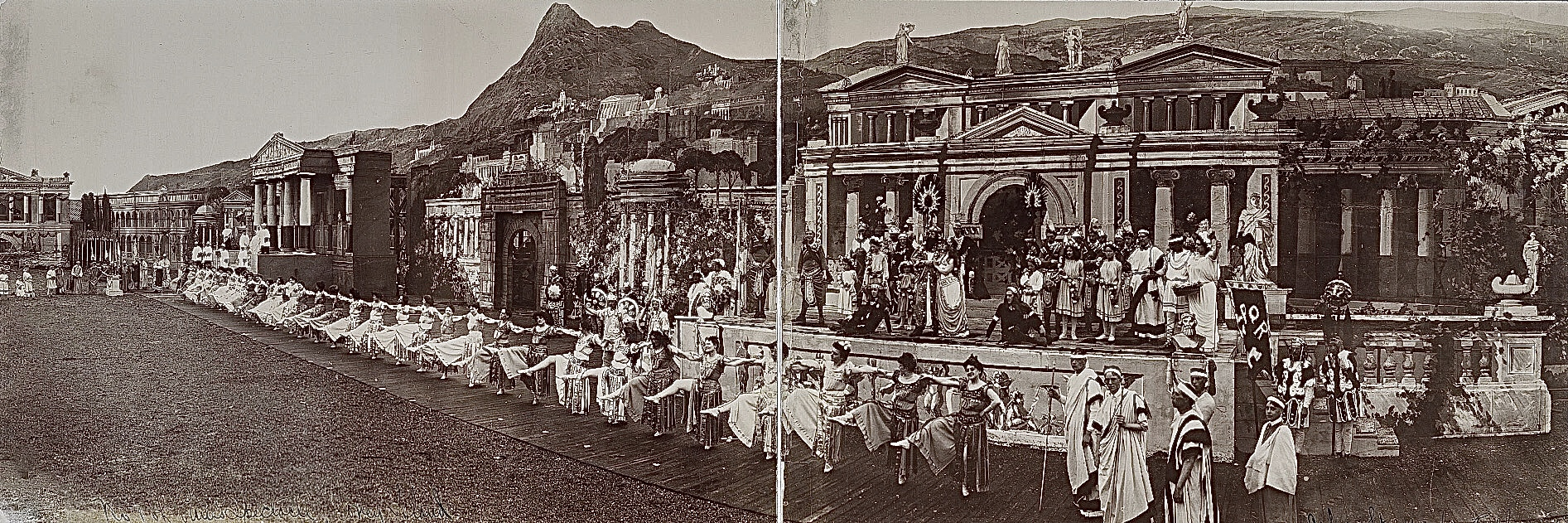
Roman-era sets built by Pain's Fireworks Company at Manhattan Beach, c. 1903; the company where the film's co-director, Frank Oakes Rose, worked as a stage manager (Library of Congress Collection)

To enhance the status of "The Most Superb Motion Picture Spectacle Ever Produced in America", Kalem would later state in its advertisements that the film's costumes were from the wardrobe collection of the Metropolitan Opera House on 39th Street in New York. In reality, the "Elliott's" screenwriter Gauntier identifies as the source for the cast's attire, was Gus Elliott, an "old German" prop and costume supplier, whose business was located at St. Mark's Place in Manhattan.

=== Chariot race ===
While Rottjer was credited as the film's "Chief Chariotier" and likely drove Ben-Hur's chariot in the staged race at Sheepshead, the other charioteers were off-duty soldiers of Brooklyn's "3rd Battery" of the National Guard. Members of that local military unit were well known for their expertise in horsemanship. As a testament to their equestrian abilities, soldiers of Brooklyn's Third Battery in August 1908 would later set a world record for "military endurance" by riding 50 miles from Nanuet, New York to Brooklyn in just six hours, much of the time traveling at night and over mountain roads. Pain's Fireworks Company provided the chariots driven by Rottjer and the guardsmen, along with some other props and related gear.

== Release and reception ==
Released on December 7, 1907, the film received positive reviews and comments in publications around the United States. The New York-based trade journal The Moving Picture World announced in its issue that day, "The Kalem Company this week put on the market the Roman spectacular subject, 'Ben Hur'." In Pittsburgh, Pennsylvania, on February 16, 1908, the city's Gazette Times reported on the presentation of Ben Hur at a new local theater, a showing enhanced by actors on site who performed sound effects and spoke dialog generally synchronized with the footage projected on screen:

At the new Savoy theater in South Highland avenue, near Center avenue, which was opened yesterday afternoon and last night in an auspicious manner, the same bill that pleased yesterday's large crowds and will be continued until the middle of next week. This repertoire includes a splendid production of "Ben Hur" by means of the motion picture camera, and with all the sound and speech accompaniments necessary for perfect realism.

The Moving Picture World in February 1908 also updated its readers on audience reactions to Kalem's release. "'Ben Hur'", reported the trade journal, "drew such crowds to a theater in Atlanta, Ga., that the police had to aid in clearing the aisles and lobby." Later in the month the film-industry publication added, "A Western newspaper in commenting on a local show refers to 'Ben Hur' as 'a wonderfully realistic and pleasing presentation of Lew Wallace's famous story and a triumph of the kinetoscopic art.'"

== Copyright infringement ==
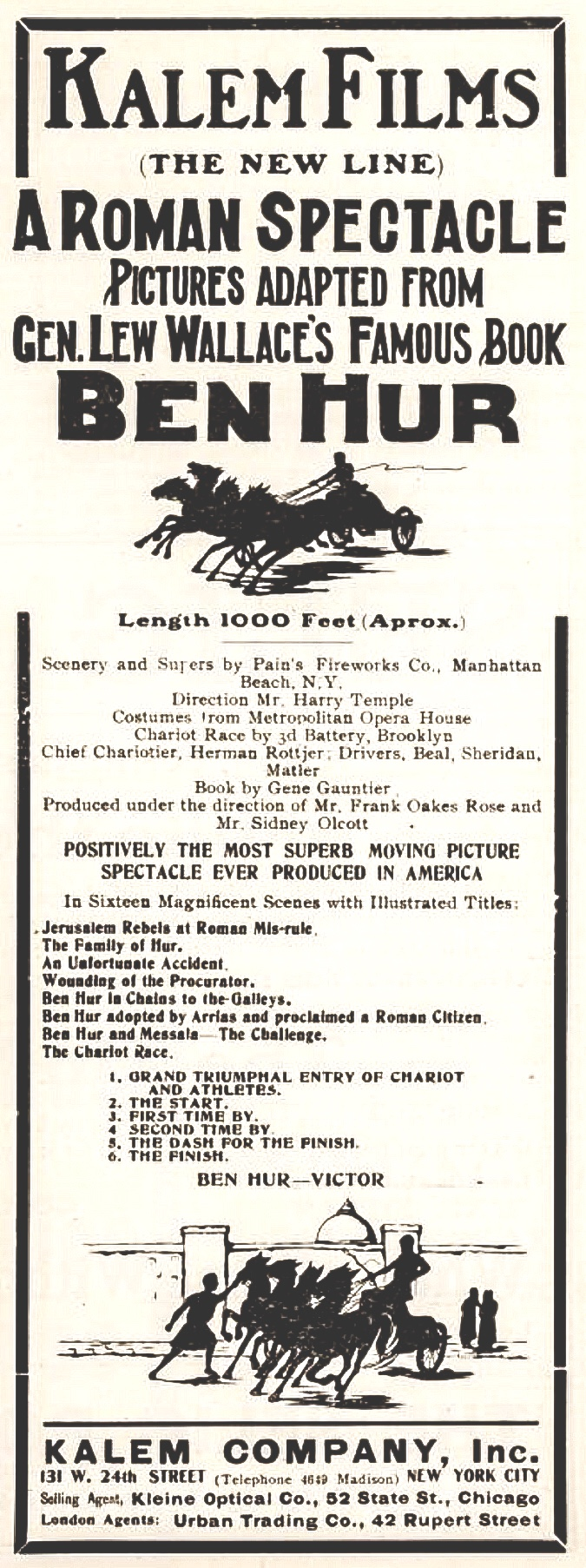
Advertisement in The Moving Picture World, December 1907

In addition to being the first screen adaptation of Lew Wallace's novel, the production is noteworthy in film history as well for establishing precedent in copyright law in the United States. The motion picture was released nearly three years after Wallace's death, but it was produced by Kalem without the permission of the author's estate. Former Kalem screenwriter Gauntier remarked in her previously cited 1928 autobiography that in the early silent era it was a common practice for studios to ignore copyrights and dismiss any proprietary rights of original authors or creators of intellectual properties.

On March 20, 1908–14 weeks after the release of Ben Hur—the publishing house Harper & Brothers, stage producers Klaw and Erlanger, and the author's estate filed a joint copyright-infringement lawsuit against the Kalem Company as well as against the Kleine Optical Company, which had produced the copies of the film for Kalem's distributors. The case was initially decided against Kalem, the primary defendant, in May 1908. Three and a half years later, on appeal to the United States Supreme Court, justices in the case Kalem Co. v. Harper Bros. issued their final ruling against the film company. That ruling on November 13, 1911 established the precedent that all motion picture production companies must first secure the film rights of any previously published work still under copyright before commissioning a screenplay based on that work. Ultimately, Kalem was required to pay the plaintiffs $25,000 ($860,000 today) as well as all related court costs for the case. Earlier, in 1908, perhaps seeking to capitalize on the growing publicity of its case against Kalem and the release of the film, Harper & Brothers published the lavishly designed illustrated book The Chariot Race from Ben-Hur by Lew Wallace, which highlights only that event from the novel. Complementing the book's text are color illustrations by Ukrainian artist Sigismond Ivanowski.

== Surviving copies of the film ==
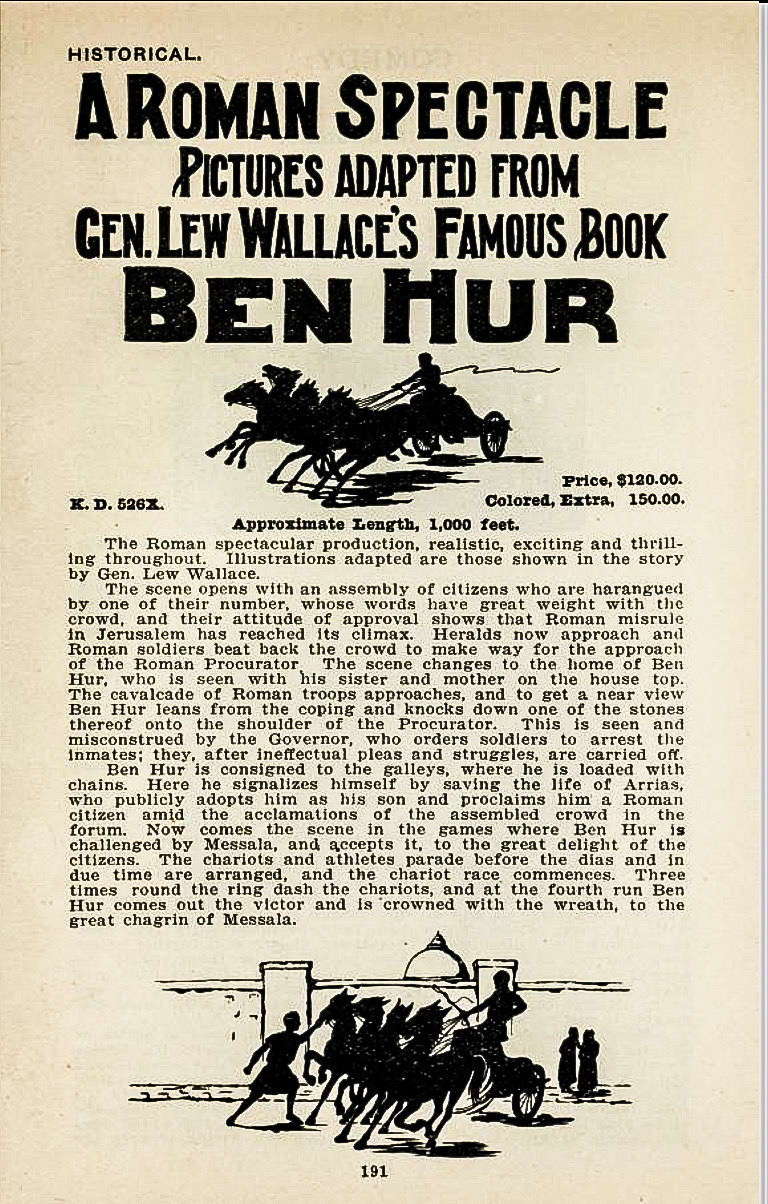
Retail prices for copies of Ben Hur in 1908 film-supply catalog

Kalem's losses in copyright litigation and the related court injunctions limiting and then preventing presentations of the company's short, the film "for the most part disappeared". For many years, even the Library of Congress did not possess a full copy of the 1907 release, but that federal institution, the Museum of Modern Art, and other repositories later located and acquired prints. Now in the public domain, additional full and partial copies of Kalem's Ben Hur are available for public viewing on online streaming services such as YouTube.

Before court-ordered injunctions and the final copyright-infringement rulings against Kalem were effectively enforced, copies of Ben Hur circulated in Europe as well as the United States. Various distributors at the time offered to sell both standard "plain stock" copies as well as hand-colored prints of the 1000-foot reel, which consists of approximately 16,000 individual frames. One American film-supply catalog in 1908 offered black-and-white prints of Ben Hur for $120 ($4,300 USD today). Color versions produced in France, painted by hand in Paris, sold for an additional $150, costing $270 per copy ($9,700 today) or 15 cents more per foot in 1908. No copies or fragments of the hand-tinted version of the film are currently known to exist.
