= The Man Who Lost Himself =

The Man Who Lost Himself may refer to:

- The Man Who Lost Himself (novel), a 1918 novel by Henry de Vere Stacpoole
  - The Man Who Lost Himself (1920 film), a lost adaptation
  - The Man Who Lost Himself (1941 film), another adaptation, starring Brian Aherne and Kay Francis
- The Man Who Lost Himself, a 1929 novel by Osbert Sitwell
- Sherlock Holmes and the Man Who Lost Himself, a 1996 novel by Val Andrews
- The Man Who Lost Himself: The Terry Evanshen Story, a 2000 non-fiction book by June Callwood concerning Canadian motivational speaker and former star receiver Terry Evanshen
