= Keim =

Keim may refer to:

== People ==
=== In arts and media ===
- Adelaide Keim, American actress
- Betty Lou Keim, American actress
- Claire Keim, French actress and singer
- De Benneville Randolph Keim, American journalist and diplomat
- Loren Keim, American author

=== In government, law, and military ===
- August Keim, German military officer
- De Benneville Randolph Keim, American journalist and diplomat
- George May Keim, American congressman
- Stephen Keim, Australian lawyer
- William High Keim, American congressman

=== In science and academia ===
- Daniel A. Keim, German computer scientist
- Donald Keim, American economist
- Karl Theodor Keim, German theologian
- Wilhelm Keim, German chemist

=== In sport ===
- Andreas Keim, German footballer
- Jenny Keim, American swimmer
- Mike Keim, American football player
- Steve Keim, American football player

== Places ==
- Keim Homestead, a historic farm
- Keim Peak, in the Usarp Mountains of Antarctica

== Other uses ==
- Keim's process, a technique of fresco preparation and painting
- Cell (music), concept in German music theory
