= The Moth and the Flame =

The Moth and the Flame may refer to:

- The Moth & The Flame, American alternative rock band
- The Moth and the Flame (play), 1898 play by Clyde Fitch
- Invocations/The Moth and the Flame, 1981 album by Keith Jarrett
- Moth and the Flame, 1938 Silly Symphony animated short film
- The Moth and the Flame (1915 film), an American silent drama film based on the play

== See also ==
- "Moth into Flame", a 2016 song by Metallica
- "Moth to a Flame", a 2021 song by Swedish House Mafia and the Weeknd
- Like Moths to Flames, an American metalcore band
- A Moth to a Flame, a translation of the 1948 novel A Burnt Child by Stig Dagerman
