= Lyceum Theatre (Park Avenue South) =

Former theatre in Manhattan, New York

Coordinates: 40.74048°N 73.98596°W

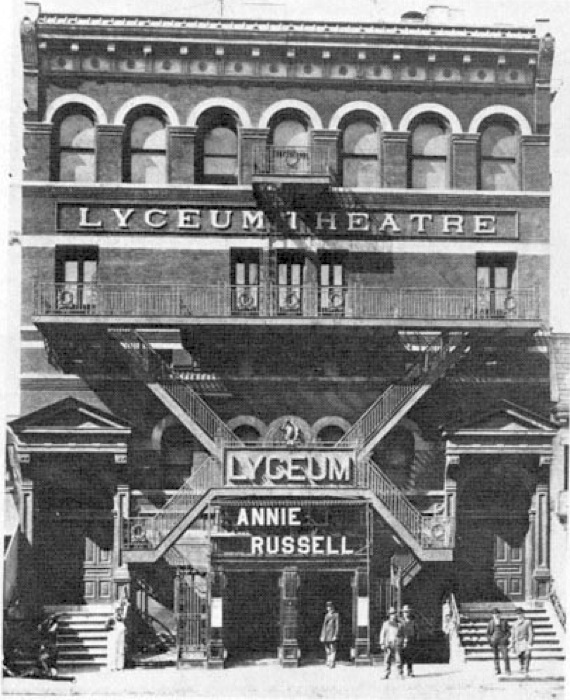
- Facade of the Lyceum announcing an appearance by Annie Russell.
- Interactive map of the Lyceum Theatre area

General information
- Location: Manhattan, New York City
- Opened: 1885
- Demolished: 1902

The Lyceum Theatre was a theatre in New York City located on Fourth Avenue (now Park Avenue South) between 23rd and 24th Streets in Manhattan. It was built in 1885 and operated until 1902, when it was torn down to make way for the Metropolitan Life Insurance Company Tower. It was replaced by a new Lyceum Theatre on 45th Street. For all but its first two seasons, the theatre was home to Daniel Frohman's Lyceum Theatre Stock Company, which presented many important plays and actors of the day.

== Building ==
The three-story building's auditorium was 75 feet (23 m) deep by 48.5 feet (14.8 m) wide, with a seating capacity of 727: boxes 88, parquet 344, dress circle 172, and balcony 123. Thomas Edison is reported to have personally worked on making it the first theatre lit entirely by electricity (not the first to use electric lights), and Louis Comfort Tiffany designed aspects of the interior. Not all new technologies lasted: for the first season the orchestra rode an "automatic elevator car" into the fly gallery to play in a gallery over the proscenium during performances, but the car was removed in the theatre's second year. Ticket prices initially ranged from $1 to $2.50.

== Origins ==
Actor, playwright and theatre technology innovator Steele Mackaye and producer Gustave Frohman built the theatre as the base for the Lyceum School of Acting, to be run by them and Franklin H. Sargent. The school quickly became the New York School of Acting and then, by 1888, the American Academy of Dramatic Arts (AADA). Sargent soon left and after six months Mackaye and Frohman were forced to sell their interests to benefit Tiffany and other creditors. Actress Helen Dauvray then became manager, making her one of the first woman theatrical executives in the U.S. Gustave's brother, the impresario Daniel Frohman, took over at the beginning of the theatre's third season and stayed until it was demolished in 1902, when he established the Lyceum Theatre on 45th St.

== Lyceum Theatre Stock Company ==
Daniel Frohman ran the Lyceum Theatre Company, a stock company with a more or less constant troupe of actors performing several different plays each season. Frohman sought to introduce as many new, “modern plays” as possible. The plays reflected both the older melodrama style and the newer naturalistic or realistic style, common to the last decades before the motion picture era. The Lyceum Company also sent productions on the road with full complements of actors, sets, musicians, crew, and publicists. (Prior to this, lead actors tended to tour alone and work with local actors and musicians, with results of varying artistic quality.) From 1886 until 1890, David Belasco worked for the Lyceum Company as stage manager (in today's terms, director or artistic director), co-wrote three of the company's productions with Henry Churchill de Mille, and taught at the acting school. In January 1899, three years before the old Lyceum shut down, Daniel Frohman moved the Lyceum Theatre Company to Daly's Theatre. He and his brother Charles Frohman continued to produce plays at the Lyceum after the stock company moved.

=== Actors ===
Lyceum productions featured top American and English actors. Many later appeared in silent films.

- W.C. Bellows
- William Courtleigh
- Rowland Buckstone
- Georgia Cayvan
- Helen Dauvray
- James K. Hackett
- Virginia Harned
- Isabel Irving
- Herbert Kelcey
- W.J. LeMoyne
- Sarah Cowell Le Moyne
- Enid Leslie
- Mary Mannering
- Edward J. Morgan
- Kate Pattison-Selten
- Annie Russell
- Morton Selten
- Effie Shannon
- E.H. Sothern
- Sam Sothern
- Ernest Tarleton
- Elizabeth “Bessie” Tyree
- Charles Walcot
- Mrs. Charles Walcot
- Thomas Whiffen
- Mrs. Thomas “Blanche” Whiffen

Among the married couples in the company were:

- William Faversham and Julie Opp
- James K. Hackett and Mary Mannering
- Herbert Kelcey and Effie Shannon
- Morton Selten and Kate Pattison-Selten
- E.H. Sothern and Virginia Harned
- Mr. and Mrs. Charles Walcot
- Mr. and Mrs. Thomas Whiffen

== Presentations ==
Over 80 plays were presented at the Lyceum, not counting dozens of benefits, concerts, lectures, amateur and student productions, short-stay touring performances, and revivals of these plays in repertory. (WP=world premiere, AP=American premiere.)

- Dakolar, Steele Mackaye, 4/6/1885.
- In Spite of All, Steele Mackaye after Victorien Sardou, 9/15/1885.
- One of Our Girls, Bronson Howard, 1/10/1885. 200 performances.
- The Highest Bidder, J. Maddison Morton, 5/3/1887. WP, first D. Frohman/Belasco production.
- Editha's Burglar, Frances Hodgson Burnett and George Flemine, 9/19/1887.
- The Wife, David Belasco and Henry DeMille, 11/1/1887. WP, 239 perfs.
- Lord Chumley, Henry De Mille and David Belasco, 8/21/1888. WP.
- Sweet Lavender, Arthur Wing Pinero, 11/13/1888. AP, 100+ perfs.
- The Marquis, Sardou, 3/18/1889.
- The Charity Ball, David Belasco and Henry DeMille, 11/19/1889, WP, 200 perfs.
- The Maister of Woodbarrow, Jerome K. Jerome, 8/26/1890. AP.
- The Idler, C. Haddon Chambers, 11/11/1890. WP.
- Nerves, J. Comyns Carr, 1/19/1891. AP.
- Old Heads and Young Hearts, Dion Boucicault, 4/6/1891.
- The Dancing Girl, Henry Arthur Jones, 8/31/1891. AP.
- Lady Bountiful, Arthur Wing Pinero, 11/16/1891. AP.
- Squire Kate, adapted by Robert Buchanan, 1/18/1892.
- Merry Gotham, Elisabeth Marbury, 3/14/1892. WP.
- Captain Lettarblair, Marguerite Merrington, 8/16/1892. WP.
- Americans Abroad, Sardou, 12/5/1892.
- The Guardsman, George R. Sims and Cecil Raleigh, 4/3/1893.
- Sheridan, or the Maid of Bath, Paul Potter, 9/5/1893.
- Our Country Cousins, Paul Potter, 1/8/1894. WP.
- The Amazons, Arthur Wing Pinero, 2/19/1894. AP, 100+ perfs.
- The Case of Rebellious Susan, Henry Arthur Jones, 12/29/1894.
- The Prisoner of Zenda, Edward E. Rose, 9/4/1895. 200 perfs.
- The Home Secretary, R. C. Carton, 11/25/1895. AP.
- An Enemy to the King, R.N. Stephens, 9/1/1896. 103 perfs.
- The Late Mr. Castello, Sydney Grundy, 12/14/1896.
- The First Gentleman of Europe, Frances Hodgson Burnett and George Fleming, 1/25/1897.
- The Mysterious Mr. Bugle, Madeleine Lucette Ryley, 4/19/1897.
- The Princess and the Butterfly, Arthur Wing Pinero, 11/23/1897.
- The Tree of Knowledge, R. C. Carton, 1/24/1898.
- The Moth and the Flame, Clyde Fitch, 4/11/1898.
- The Adventure of Lady Ursula, Anthony Hope, 9/1/1898.
- Trelawny of the 'Wells', Arthur Wing Pinero, 11/22/1898. AP, 131 perfs.
- His Excellency the Governor, Capt. Robert Marshall, 5/9/1899. First post-Lyceum Stock Company production.
- Miss Hobbs, Jerome K. Jerome, 9/7/1899. 158 perfs.
- My Daughter-in-Law, Paul Bilhaud and Michel Carré, 2/26/1900.
- A Royal Family, Capt. Robert Marshall, 9/5/1900. 175 perfs.
- The Love Match, Sydney Grundy, 10/12/1901.
- The Girl and the Judge, Clyde Fitch, 12/4/1901. Last production at the old Lyceum Theatre, 125 perfs.
