= William J. Le Moyne =

American actor

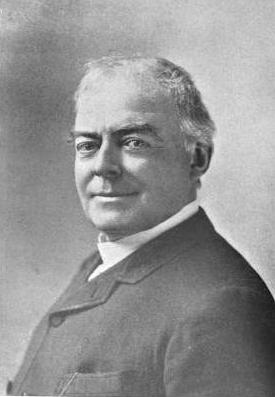
- Circa 1890s
- Born: April 29, 1831; Boston, Massachusetts, US
- Died: November 6, 1905 (aged 74); New York City, New York, US
- Other name: W. J. LeMoyne
- Occupation: Stage actor
- Years active: 1852–1901

Signature
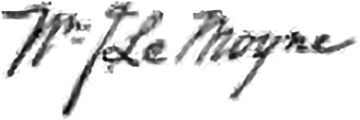

William J. Le Moyne (1831–1905) was an American actor who is credited with playing Deacon Perry in the first stage adaption of Harriet Beecher Stowe's novel, Uncle Tom's Cabin.

== Early career ==
William J. Le Moyne (sometimes spelled Lemoyne or LeMoyne) was born on April 29, 1831, in Boston, Massachusetts, where he began performing in amateur theater productions at around the age of fifteen. Le Moyne may have briefly supported himself as a silversmith before his professional stage debut on May 10, 1852, at Portland, Maine, playing an officer in The Lady of Lyons, a romantic drama by Edward Bulwer-Lytton. Later that year Le Moyne joined the repertory company at Peale's Museum in Troy, New York, as a $6 a-week "utility man" (bit player) that was later increased to $8 after he demonstrated an ability to play 'old man roles'. The company was largely made up of friends and family of its manager, George C. Howard and is remembered for staging the first production of Uncle Tom's Cabin on September 27, 1852, at Peale's Museum. The play, an eloquent critique of slavery, was an immediate hit and enjoyed a run of roughly one hundred performances, remarkable at the time for a community the size of Troy. Le Moyne's tour with Uncle Tom's Cabin the following year paved the way for his career. Soon, he was an actor of national standing.

== Military service ==
At the outbreak of the American Civil War, Le Moyne enlisted as a first lieutenant with Company B of the 28th Massachusetts Volunteers under the command of fellow actor Lawrence Barrett. Barrett later resigned, and Le Moyne assumed command, only to witness over half his men killed or wounded in a string of defeats in South Carolina and Virginia. In September 1862, Le Moyne himself was severely wounded during the Battle of South Mountain and was unable to return to military service. He was later granted by Congress a retroactive promotion to the rank of captain dating back to the point he assumed command of company B.

== Career ==
In 1863, Le Moyne returned to the stage, where he remained active until the dawn of the twentieth century. He appeared in a number of plays based on the works of Charles Dickens playing such characters as Fagin, Captain Cuttle, Uriah Heep, Squeers, Plummer, Dick Swiveller and Caleb. In Shakespeare's Hamlet Le Moyne is said to have played every major male role except that of the prince himself. Over his career Le Moyne performed with companies headed by legendary actors Edwin Booth, Edwin Forrest and Charles Fletcher (or possibly Charles Fechter), and in producer Daniel Frohman's Lyceum Theatre Company. Heart trouble forced Le Moyne to retire from the stage in 1901 after supporting James K. Hackett in Don Caesar's Return.

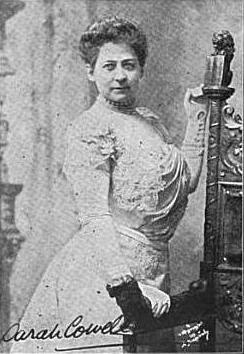
Mrs. Sarah Cowell Le Moyne (c. 1900)

== Marriage ==
His first marriage to actress Sarah Le Moyne ended in divorce in 1886 or 1887. He married his second wife, actress Sarah Emma Cowell, in June 1888, and remained with her until the end of his life. Sarah, who was an accomplished actress and reader at the time of their marriage, went on to have a successful Broadway career under her married name.

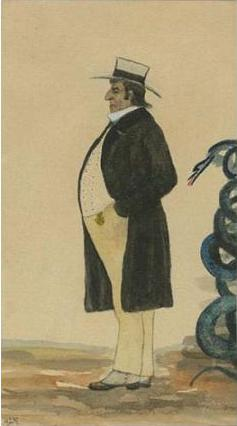
William J. Le Moyne - Self Portrait in Watercolor (c. 1880)- Courtesy Mary Chitty - Life and Times of Actress E.J. Phillips

== Hobbies ==
Le Moyne was an eclectic collector whose house was adorned with paintings of Chinese actors, old plaques, a variety of smoking pipes, an idol from a Chinese temple, antique children's shoes, artifacts from several ancient American and Asian cultures and works by contemporary American artists. He had also gathered a large assortment of horseshoes, his favorite being one he found in New York City on Thirteenth Street one Friday with seven nails still attached. Le Moyne's most valuable collection would come from a lifelong passion for obtaining old and rare books. Offstage Le Moyne was also known as a painter in the medium of watercolor.

== Death ==
William J. Lemoyne died after several years of declining health on November 6, 1905, at a friend's residence in Inwood-on-the-Hudson (now Inwood), a neighborhood on the northern shore of Manhattan Island.

== Plays ==
1852	Lady of Lyons	First Officer
1852	Ingomar	Friar Lawrence, Sir Oliver Surface, Eugene Delorme and Polydore
1852	Uncle Tom's Cabin	Deacon Perry
1891	Old Heads and Young Hearts	Jesse Rule
1887	The Wife (play)	Major Homer Q. Putnam
1872	The Provoked Husband	John Moody
1889	London Assurance	Sir Harcourt Courtly
1872	Article 47	Old Simon
1872	Road to Ruin	Silky
1872	The Inconstant	Caius
1882	Manhood (play)	Peter Sharpley
1885	Saints and Sinners	Deacon Samuel Hoggard
1883	The Rajah	Joseph Jeckyll
1883	Sealed Instructions	Mons Cervais
1889	The Charity Ball	Ex-Judge Peter Gurney Knox
1888	Sweet Lavender	Barrister Dick Phenyl
1891	Lady Bountiful	Rederick Heron
1895	The Case of Rebellious Susan	Admiral Darby
1895	The Private Secretary	Lord Blayver
1886	Jim, the Penman	Baron Hartfeldt
1896	The Benefit of the Doubt	Fletcher Portwood
1872	Divorce	Detective Burritt
1892	Squire Kate	Gaffer Kingsley
1886	Our Society	Reginald Rae
1898	Catherine	M. Vallon
1900	The Choir Invisible	Rev. James Moore
1900	Naughty Anthony	Adam Budd
1898	The Moth and the Flame	Mr. Dawson
1897	The Coat of many Colors	Florian Walboys
1898	Tess of the D'Urbervilles	John Durbeyfeld
1897	Roaring Dick and Co.	Mr. Pontifax
1900	Don Caesar's Return	Marquis of Gonzalo
