= The Princess and the Butterfly =

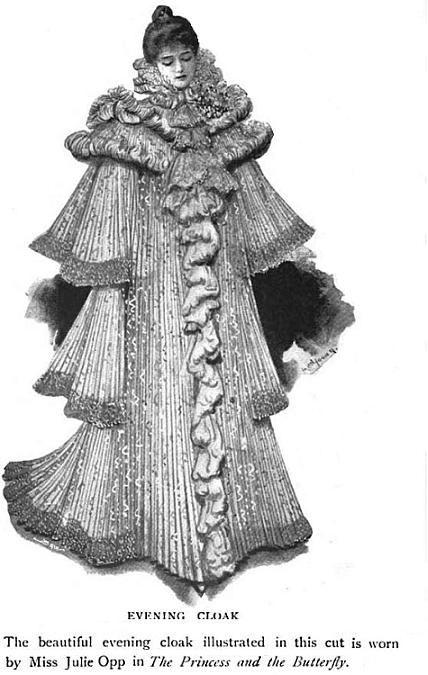
The Ludgate Monthly, 1897

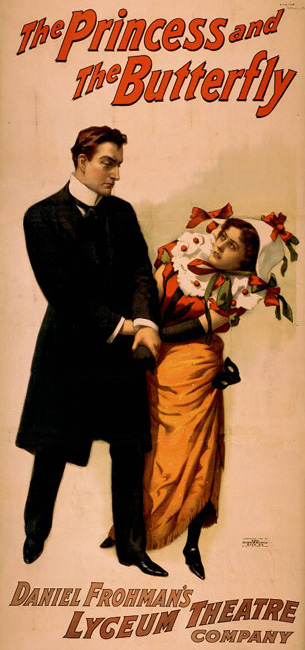
Theatrical poster for The Princess and the Butterfly by Daniel Frohman's Lyceum Theatre Company.

The Princess and The Butterfly: or, The Fantastics is a comedy in five acts by Arthur Wing Pinero first produced at London’s St. James's Theatre on 25 March 1897 and in New York at the Lyceum Theatre on 23 November 1897. The New York version of The Princess and the Butterfly was somewhat abbreviated from the four-hour production that originally played in London.

== Synopsis ==
- Act I, London.—at Princess Pannonia's residence on Park Lane.
- Act II, London.—at St. Roche's residence on Grosvenor Place. (Some Weeks Elapse.)
- Act III, Paris.—at Princess Pannonia's residence on the Avenue des Champs-Filysees.
- Act IV, Paris.—same as act III, different room. (A Month Passes.)
- Act V, Paris—an orchard, near Fontenay-Sous-Bois.

Princess Pannonia is the English-born wife of a Hungarian noble who has spent the last twenty years of her life living in the remote castle of Mornavitza. After her husband dies, the princess returns to London where she falls in love with Sir George Lamorant, an old friend once known as "the butterfly." Their plans to marry though are soon complicated by a shared fear of approaching middle age.

Dramatic Technique, By George Pierce Baker, 1919

In The Princess and the Butterfly, Act I not only disposes of preliminary necessary exposition, but depicts different kinds of restlessness in a group of women at or nearing middle age. Act II does the same for a group of men, and in the proposed duel provides what later may be made to reveal to Sir George how much Fay Zuliani cares for him. Act III complicates the story by showing that Fay is not the niece of Sir George, and illustrates the growing affection between the Princess and Edward Oriel. Act IV reveals to Sir George and Fay how much each cares for the other. The fifth act shows how Sir George and the Princess, who have tried to be wise and restrained, impulsively and instinctively, choose the path of seeming unwisdom but immediate happiness.

== Reception ==
The Era commented, "Mr Pinero's latest piece possesses in a high degree the rare and subtle quality of tone. And to deserve this praise though five acts and four hours is such a supreme achievement for a dramatist." The Pall Mall Gazette called the piece "the most interesting of the original plays to be seen at present on the London boards, and probably the most interesting that has been seen on them for a considerable time". The Evening Standard found the play "at once fantastic and true to life … very much indeed of a love story for no fewer than three pairs of lovers are left on the verge of matrimony."

The Opera Glass, 1897, commented on the American production:

Daniel Frohman's stock company returned to the Lyceum, opening in Pinero's, The Princess and the Butterfly. You all know what a Pinero play is; well, this one is just like the others. It tells an impossible story but gives ample opportunity for the men and women to exhibit themselves. Yet the play was a success. There can be no doubt of that. But the success is due to Mr. Frohman's clever company, chief among which is Julie Opp, who appeared in the original production in London. Miss Opp is a beautiful woman and looked and acted the part of the Princess to perfection. The acting of James K. Hackett and Mary Mannering was additional proof of their talent. Mr. Morgan, Mrs. Whitten and Mrs. Walcot were delightful as usual.

The American University Magazine, 1897, said, "The delightful play, The Princess and the Butterfly, will doubtless have a long run at the Lyceum. The public appreciates that It is getting a good deal for one's ticket to have two leading roles with Mary Mannering and Julie Opp to fill them".

== Original London and New York casts ==
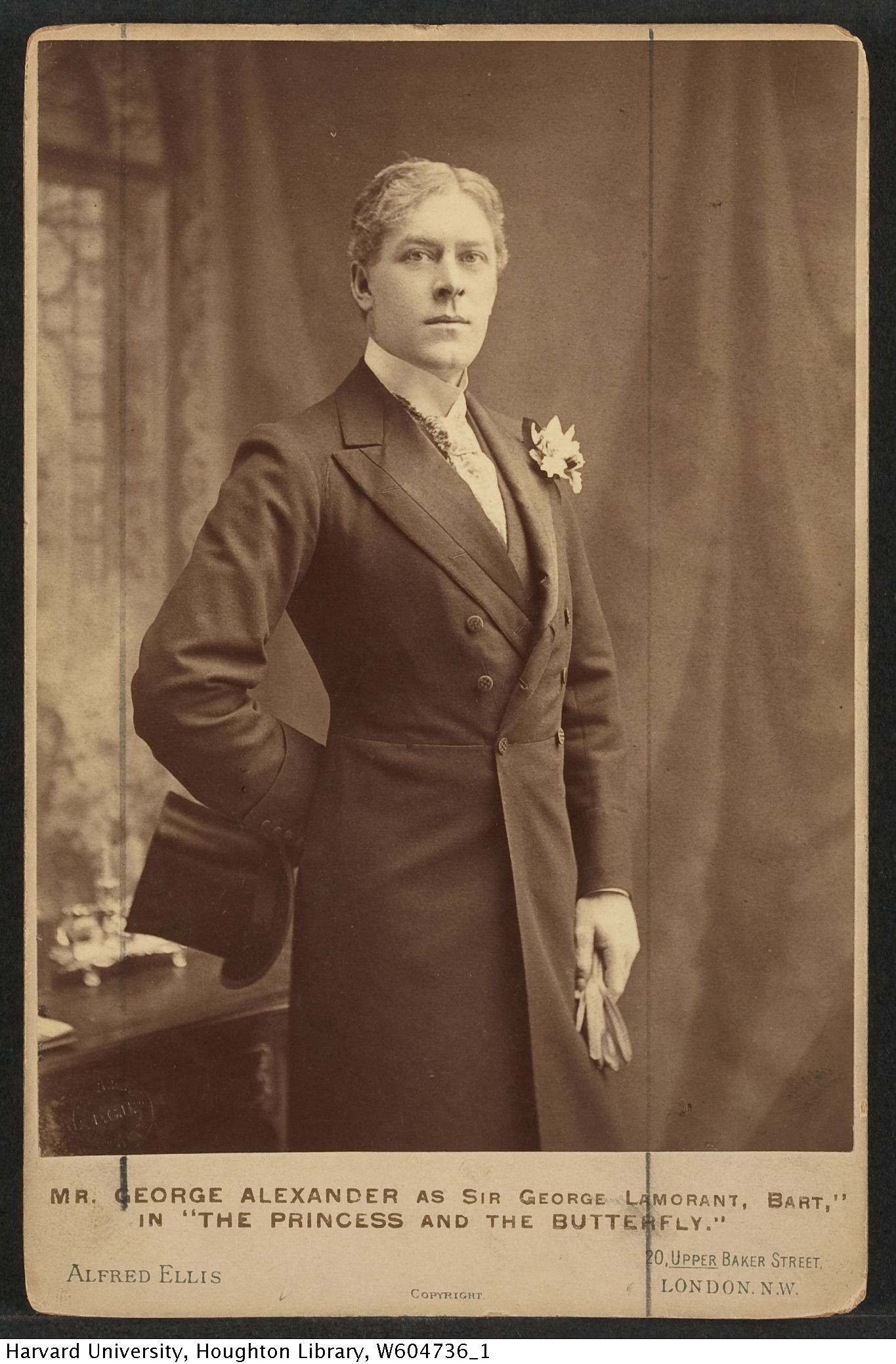
George Alexander as George Lamorant

Role	London	New York
Catharine	Eleanor Aickin	Evelyn Carter
Maxime Demailly	A. Royston	William Courtleigh
Faulding	A. W. Munroe	John Findlay
Annis Marsh	Dorothy Hammond	Katherine Florence
Mrs. Marsh	Mrs. Kem Mis	Grace Root
Percival Ord	Adolphus Vane-Tempest	Seymour George
George Lamorant	George Alexander	James K. Hackett
Blanche Oriel	Mabel Hackney	Helen Macbeth
Fay Zuliani	Fay Davis	Mary Mannering
Bartley Levan	Gerald Gurney	Henry Miller
The Hon Charles Denstroude	Frank R. Mills	Ivo Dawson
Edward Oriel	H. B. Irving	Edward Morgan
Mr. St. Roche	H. V. Esmond	Felix Morris
Mrs. St. Roche	Miss C. Granville	Elizabeth Tyree
Mrs. Sabiston	Mrs. Cecil Raleigh	Nina Morris
Mrs. Ware	Julie Opp	Alison Skipworth
Adrian Mylls	George Bancroft	H. S. Taber
The Princess Pannonia	Julia Neilson	Julie Opp
Major-Gen. Sir Robert Chichele, K.C.B	H. H. Vincent	Charles Walcot
Lady Ringstead	Rose Leclercq	Mrs. Charles Walcot
Lady Chichele	Pattie Bell	Blanche Whiffen
Lieut.Colonel Arthur Eave	C. A. Smith	George Alison
Sir James Velleret	M. P. R. Dalton	n/a
Col. the Hon. Reginald Ughbrook, C.B.	C. Stafford	n/a
Mrs. Ughbrook	Leila Repton	n/a
Count Vladislau Reviczky	S. Hamilton	n/a
General Yanokoff	Mr. Richards	n/a
Madame Yanokoff	Ellen Standing	n/a

Sources: Arthur Wing Pinero, Playwright: a Study by Hamilton Fyfe, 1902 and Plays of the Present by John Bouvé Clapp and Edwin Francis Edgett, 1902
