= Trelawny of the "Wells" =

1898 play by Arthur Wing Pinero

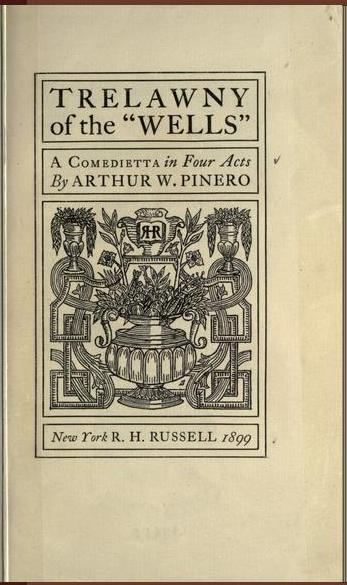
- Cover of an early edition
- Original language: English
- Written by: Arthur Wing Pinero
- Subject: theatre, class, love
- Genre: comedy
- Setting: London in the 1860s

Premiere
- Date: 29 January 1898
- Place: Court Theatre, London

Trelawny of the "Wells" is an 1898 comic play by Arthur Wing Pinero. It tells the story of a theatre star who attempts to give up the stage for love, but is unable to fit into conventional society.

== Synopsis ==
Trelawny of the "Wells" tells the story of Rose Trelawny, a popular star of melodrama plays at the Barridge Wells Theatre (a thinly disguised Sadler's Wells Theatre). Rose gives up the stage when she decides to marry her sweetheart, Arthur Gower, in order to please his conservative family. She finds life with Arthur's grandfather and great-aunt, Sir William and Lady Trafalgar, unbearably dull, and they detest her loud and unrestrained personality. Rose runs back to the theatre, abandoning Arthur. But her experience of the "real world" has killed her talent for melodrama, and she cannot recapture the liveliness that had made her a star. Meanwhile, Arthur has secretly run away to become an actor at the Bristol Old Vic.

The problem is solved when Rose encounters Sir William again, and she reawakens his memory of admiring the great actor Edmund Kean as a young man. Sir William offers to help Rose's friend, Tom Wrench, an aspiring playwright who dreams of staging plays in a more realist style than the melodramas that dominate the stage. Tom stages the play with Rose as the star, and her newfound seriousness fits his style perfectly. Tom secretly arranges for Arthur to play the leading male role, and the lovers are re-united on stage.

== Subject matter ==
The play is about the theatre of the 1860s and Pinero insisted that the costume and production design perfectly recapture the fashions of the period. It depicts the melodrama that was popular at the time, but Tom Wrench's play is a reference to the new, more realistic drawing-room comedies that were beginning to be staged at the Prince of Wales's Theatre. Alice Marriott served as one of the models for the characters Avonia Bunn and Violet Sylvester in the play.

== Performances ==
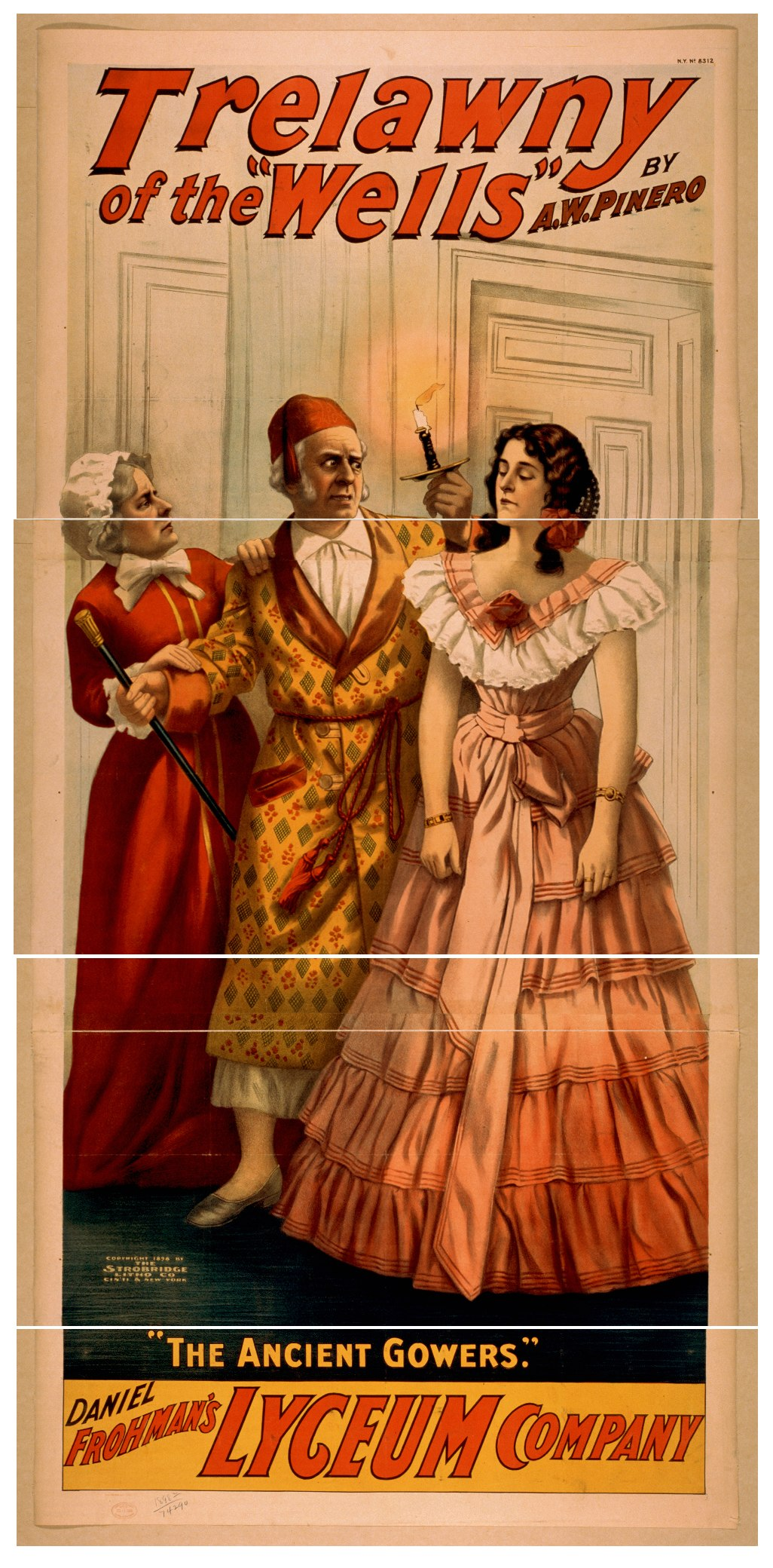
"The Ancient Gowers": Poster for Daniel Frohman's 1898 Broadway production starring Mary Mannering

The play was first staged at the Royal Court Theatre in London on 20 January 1898. It received lukewarm reviews.

Trelawny opened in New York on 22 November 1898, at producer Daniel Frohman's old Lyceum Theatre. It ran for 131 performances, and starred Mary Mannering in the title role of Rose Trelawny, Hilda Spong, Mrs. Thomas W. Whiffen (whose husband also appeared in the cast), and Elizabeth Tyree. Adelaide Keim as also in the 1898 cast. Fred Williams directed, E. G. Unitt designed the sets, Percy Anderson designed the costumes, and Frank Howson composed the incidental music.

Pinero revised Trelawny heavily for performance at the Old Vic in 1925. It was revived in New York that year, as well as in 1911, 1927, and 1975. The cast of the 1975 production, at Lincoln Center, included Mary Beth Hurt, Mandy Patinkin, John Lithgow and, in her Broadway debut, Meryl Streep.

Trelawny of the Wells (by Arthur Wing Pinero), 1992 – 1993, at Comedy Theatre, Theatre Royal, Bath London. (Jason Connery as Arthur Gower, Sarah Brightman as Rose Trelawny, Helena Bonham Carter as Imogen Parrot)

Trelawny of the Wells (by Arthur Wing Pinero) by National Theatre, since 12 February 1993, at Olivier Theatre, National Theatre. (Helen McCrory as Rose Trelawny, Ben Miles as Arthur Gower, Adam Kotz as Tom Wrench)

An adaptation by Patrick Marber, directed by Joe Wright played at the Donmar Warehouse in 2013.

== Film and T.V. adaptations ==
In 1916, the play was adapted into a silent film Trelawny of the Wells directed by Cecil Hepworth and starring Alma Taylor, Stewart Rome, and Violet Hopson. The play was adapted a second time in 1928 by Metro-Goldwyn-Mayer as The Actress, directed by Sidney Franklin and starring Norma Shearer. There was also a 1938 adaptation directed by Tyrone Guthrie. It was also an episode of the BBC's Theatre Night series, in 1985, being directed by Tony Kingdom.

== Awards and nominations ==
=== 1975 Broadway revival ===
Year	Award	Category	Nominee	Result
1976	Tony Award	Tony Award for Best Featured Actress in a Play	Mary Beth Hurt	Nominated
1976	Tony Award	Best Scenic Design	David Mitchell	Nominated
1976	Tony Award	Best Lighting Design	Ian Calderon	Nominated
1976	Drama Desk Award	Outstanding Revival		Nominated
1976	Drama Desk Award	Outstanding Actress in a Play	Meryl Streep	Nominated
1976	Drama Desk Award	Outstanding Costume Design	Theoni V. Aldredge	Nominated
1976	Drama Desk Award	Outstanding Lighting Design	Ian Calderon	Nominated

== Bibliography ==
- Jacky Bratton, ed. Trelawny of the "Wells" and Other Plays (Oxford, 1995)
- John Chapman and Garrison P. Sherwood, eds., The Best Plays of 1894-1899 (New York: Dodd, Mead and Company, 1955)
