= Georgia Cayvan =

American actress

- Georgia Cayvan in 1894
- Born: Georgie Eva Cayvan; August 22, 1857; Bath, Maine, US
- Died: November 19, 1906 (aged 49); Flushing, New York, US
- Occupations: Actress, Comedian

Georgie Eva Cayvan (August 22, 1857 – November 19, 1906) was a popular stage actress in the United States in the later part of the nineteenth century.

== Early life ==
Georgia Cayvan was born at Bath, Maine. She attended and graduated from the Boston School of Oratory. She initially earned a living as a professional fortune teller. She had insight into how to play out stage drama and brought her characters to fruition with her humor and expressive eyes.

== Career ==
Cayvan in 1879 accepted her first job on stage as Hebe in H.M.S. Pinafore with the Boston Ideal Opera Company. She was a member of the Union Square Company. She appeared in Hazel Kirke at the Madison Square Theatre in New York City in 1881. She played the part of Dolly Dutton. In 1881 she played the heroine part in a road company in such comedies and dramas as The Professor (1881); The White Slave (1882); Siberia (1883); May Blossom (1884); The Wife (1887); The Charity Ball (1889); and Squire Kate (1892). She then appeared in "Oedipus Tyrannus" at the Boston Theater.

Cayvan also acted at Booth's Theatre in New York City. She performed at the Fourteenth Street Theatre in "The White Slave" and Laura in "The Romany Rye." She also played Marcelle in "A Parisian Romance" in the Union Square Company. Cayvan was successful in the leading part of David Belasco’s "La Belle Russe." She was also a short time with Dion Boucicault.

In 1893 Cayvan became one of the first people to wear a glass dress. The dress was too brittle to be practical however. It was exhibited at the World's Columbian Exposition in The Chicago's World's Fair of 1893. An article in The New York Times of July 28, 1893, predicted that glass dresses would become a fashion "fad." It points out that the first dress was made for Cayvan for her performance in "American Abroad." It was made by the Libbey Glass Company. Author Amelia Ransome Neville in her book gave an account of seeing Cayvan wear the fiberglass dress made by Edward Drummond Libbey. She points out that Cayvan wore it in The Charity Ball.

In 1886 Cayvan contracted with Daniel Frohman, becoming the star of the Lyceum Theater in New York. Cayvan toured with her own company (which included Lionel Barrymore) starting in 1896. In March 1897, she performed with her company in El Paso, Texas in a production called "Squire Kate". She was involved in a difficult divorce case in 1896 as being the other woman. She was, however, totally exonerated after defending herself. Cayvan received much support from several women's groups.

== Later life and death ==
After an operation in 1892 her health began to fail. In 1900 her poor health forced her to retire to the Sandford Sanitarium in Flushing, New York. There she died in 1906, aged 49, after an illness. She is buried at Newton Cemetery, Newton Massachusetts.
