= Keem =

Keem is a surname. Notable people with the surname include:

- Keemstar (born Daniel Keem; 1982), American internet personality
- Hella Keem (1915–1997), Estonian folklorist and linguist

== See also ==
- Baby Keem (born 2000), American rapper and record producer
- Keim (disambiguation)
