= The Actress (1928 film) =

1928 film

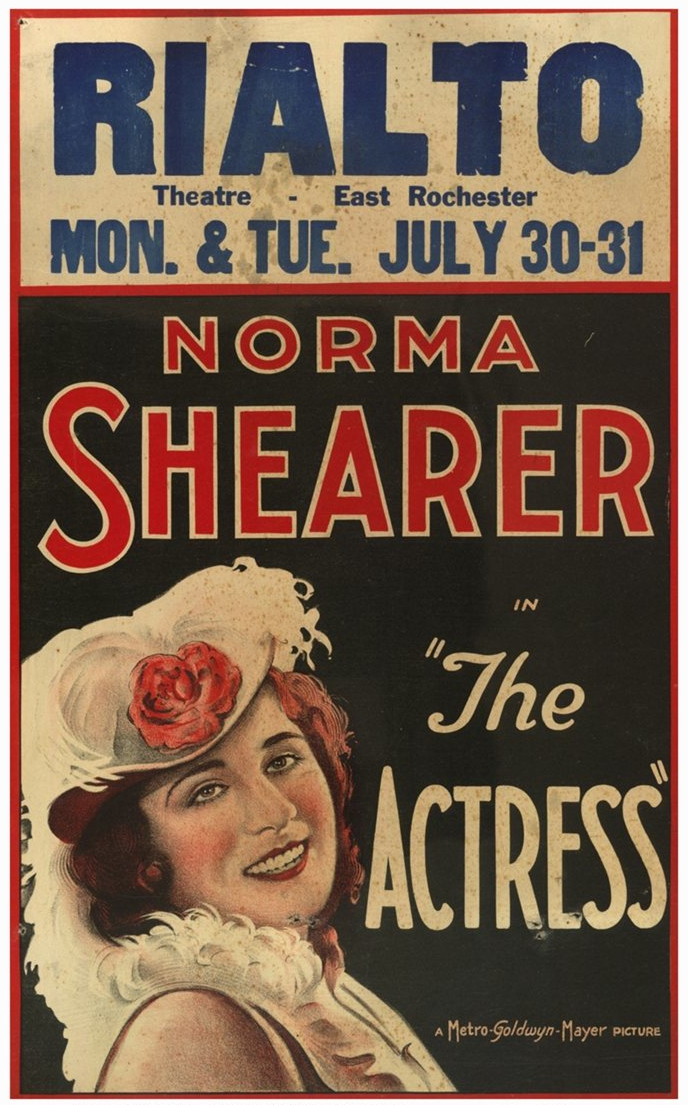
- 1928 lobby poster
- Directed by: Sidney Franklin
- Written by: Albert Lewin; Richard Schayer; Joseph Farnham (intertitles)
- Based on: Trelawny of the "Wells"; 1898 play by Arthur Wing Pinero
- Produced by: Louis B. Mayer; Irving Thalberg
- Starring: Norma Shearer
- Cinematography: William H. Daniels
- Edited by: Conrad A. Nervig
- Production company: Metro-Goldwyn-Mayer
- Distributed by: Metro-Goldwyn-Mayer Distributing Corp.
- Release date: April 28, 1928 (U.S.)
- Running time: 70 minutes
- Country: United States
- Languages: Silent; English intertitles

The Actress is a lost 1928 American silent drama film produced and distributed by Metro-Goldwyn-Mayer. The film was directed by Sidney Franklin, and starred Norma Shearer.

This film was based on the 1898 play Trelawny of the "Wells" by Arthur Wing Pinero that had first premiered on Broadway in 1898, starring Mary Mannering, which was revived by Ethel Barrymore in 1911, Laurette Taylor in 1925, and at the time this film was produced (1927) by Helen Gahagan. The play was first brought to the screen as a British made silent film Trelawny of the "Wells" in 1916.

== Plot ==
A London West End theater troupe loses its star actress Rose Trelawny when she chooses to marry Arthur Gower, a wealthy young man from another part of society. The story follows their love and the challenges they face. It also reflects the changing world of theater in the late nineteenth century.

== Cast ==
- Norma Shearer as Rose Trelawny
- Owen Moore as Tom Wrench
- Gwen Lee as Avonia
- Lee Moran as Colpoys
- Roy D'Arcy as Gadd
- Virginia Pearson as Mrs. Telfer
- William J. Humphrey as Mr. Telfer
- Effie Ellsler as Mrs. Mossop
- Ralph Forbes as Arthur Gower
- O. P. Heggie as Vice-Chancellor Sir William Gower
- Andree Tourneur as Clara de Foenix
- Cyril Chadwick as Captain de Foenix
- Margaret Seddon as Miss Trafalgar Gower

== Preservation ==
With no holdings located in archives, The Actress is considered a lost film. This film is one of many lost MGM films dating from the 1920s.
