= Sarah Cowell Le Moyne =

American stage actress

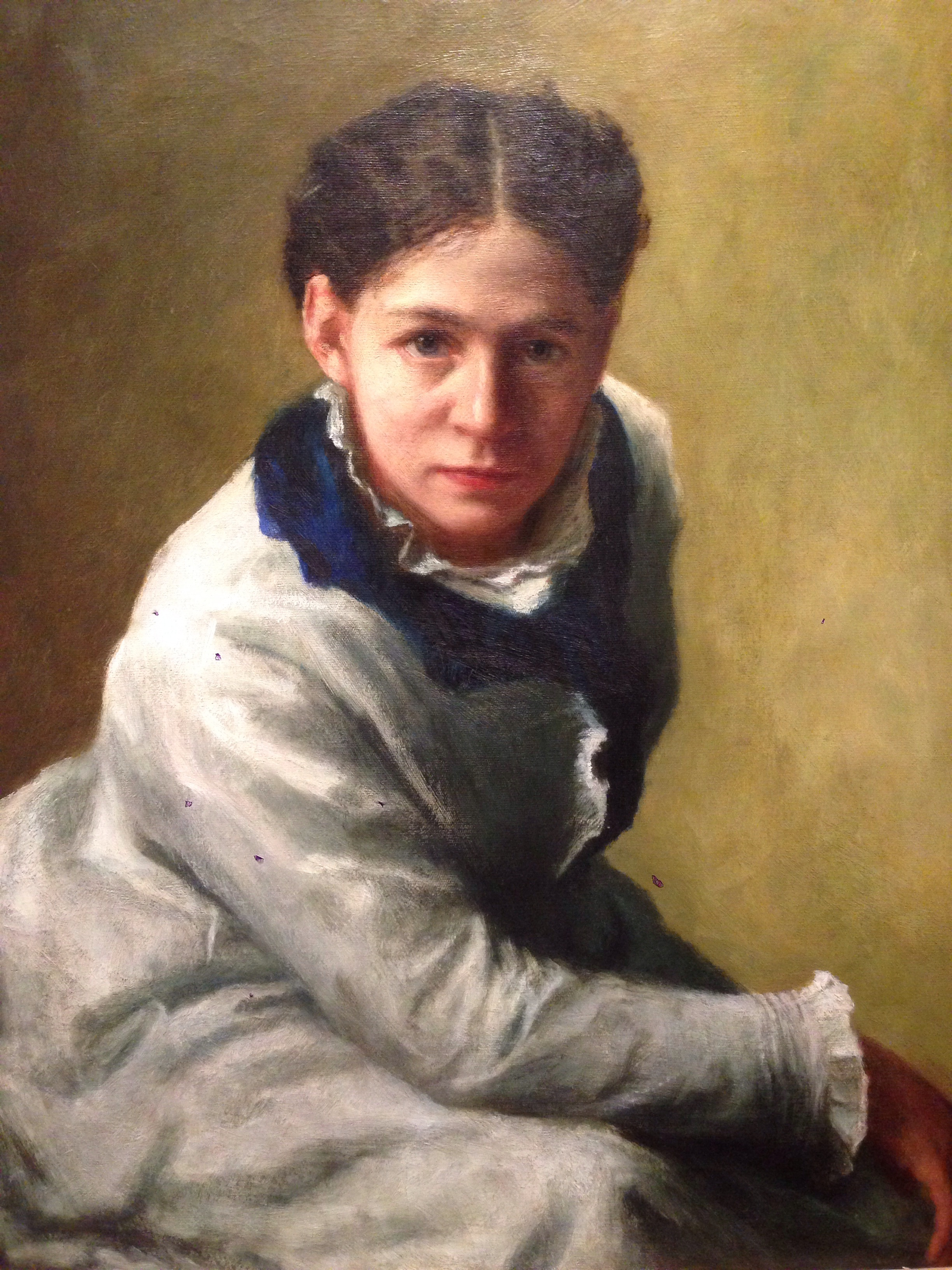
- Portrait by Jane E. Bartlett, 1877
- Born: July 22, 1859; New York City, New York, USA
- Died: July 18, 1915 (aged 55); New York City, New York, USA
- Occupation: Stage actor
- Years active: 1878–1915
- Spouse: William J. Le Moyne (1888–1905)

Sarah Cowell Le Moyne (July 22, 1859 – July 18, 1915) was an American stage actress in New York City, famous for her readings of Robert Browning's poetry, and her work with the Henry Street Settlement and Playhouse.

Her stage debut was in 1878 as a member of Albert Marshman Palmer's company in A Celebrated Case at the Union Square Theatre. In 1888 Cowell married fellow actor William J. Le Moyne and the two of them lived together on 34th Street. In 1898 she returned to the stage in a production of Clyde Fitch's The Moth and the Flame at the Lyceum Theatre. She was known for her "fine understanding and careful elocution" and in 1902 published her reminiscences. After her husband's death in 1905 she retained his name and continued to act as Mrs. Le Moyne.

During her stage career, Cowell performed in at least fifteen Broadway shows and continued as director of the 466 Grand Street branch of the Henry Street Playhouse until her death in 1915.
