= Mary Mannering =

British actress

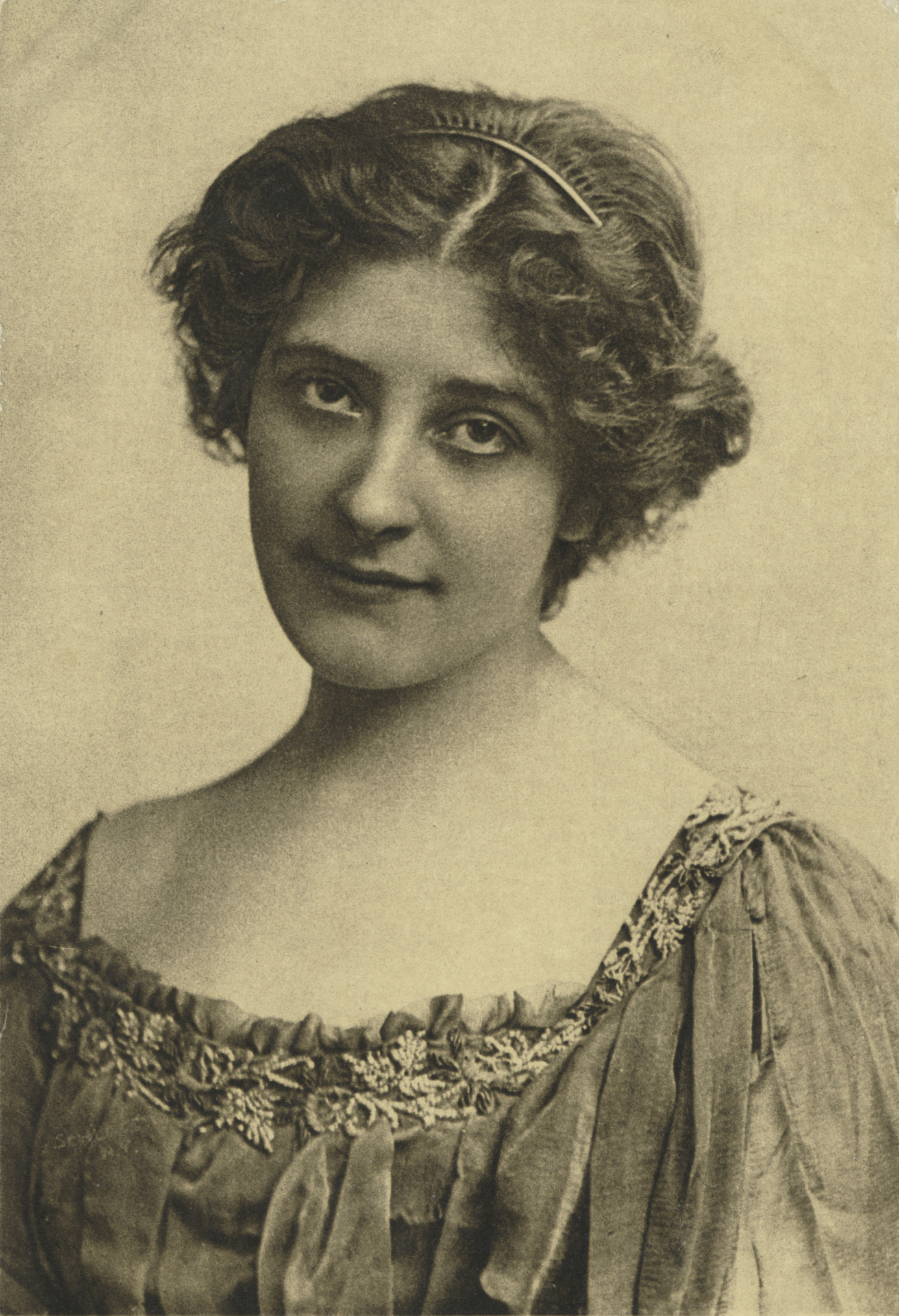
- Born: Florence Friend; April 29, 1876; London, England
- Died: January 21, 1953 (aged 76)
- Occupation: Actress
- Spouse(s): James Keteltas Hackett (1897-1910;div.); Frederick E. Wadsworth 1911-1927; his death
- Children: 1

Mary Mannering (born Florence Friend; April 29, 1876 – January 21, 1953) was an English actress. She studied for the stage under Hermann Vezin. She made her debut at Manchester in 1892 under her own name of Florence Friend.

== Biography ==
Born in England as Clara Friend, she was the daughter of Richard Friend and Eliza Whiting. Her family moved to follow her father's job in the building trade. During her teens she began to perform on the stage (She adopted the name Florence for this purpose). Her professional acting debut occurred in Manchester, England, when she was 16 years old.

She worked as a dressmaker during these years, until at least 1891. In her early 20s she was induced by a producer Daniel Frohman to come to the United States in 1896. In the United States, she began playing as "Mary Mannering" (the maiden name of her father's mother).

Mannering's American debut, in the title role in Henry V. Esmond's The Courtship of Leonie, was at Daniel Frohman's original Lyceum Theatre on December 1, 1896. (A published source says that she appeared in that role in Hartford, Connecticut, before the Lyceum performance.} Other plays with the Lyceum company included Sydney Grundy's The Late Mr. Castello on December 14, 1896, Frances Hodgson Burnett and George Fleming's The First Gentleman of Europe, Louis N. Parker's The Mayflower, and Arthur Wing Pinero's The Princess and the Butterfly (all 1897), The Tree of Knowledge by R.C. Carton, Trelawny of the 'Wells' by Pinero (both 1898), Americans at Home by Grace Livingstone Furniss (1899), and John Ingerfield by Jerome K. Jerome (1900). In 1900 Mannering starred at Buffalo, N. Y. and then in the Broadway debut of Janice Meredith, in the title role opposite Robert Drouet who played Colonel Jack Brereton in the four-act play based on a novel of the same name by Paul Leicester Ford. Thereafter, she played leading parts in White Roses (New York, 1901); The Truants (Washington, 1909); The Independent Miss Gower (Chicago, 1909); A Man's World and The Garden of Allah (New York, 1911).

== Personal life ==
She married James K. Hackett, the Lyceum company's leading actor, on May 2, 1897, though the marriage was not announced until January 1898. They had a daughter, Elise, in 1904. They were divorced on January 5, 1910. On June 1, 1911, she married automobile body executive Frederick Elliott Wadsworth in Palm Beach, Florida. She died on January 21, 1953, in St. Vincent's Hospital in Los Angeles, aged 76.

== Publications ==
- Blum, Daniel C., Great Stars of the American Stage #Profile 9, c.1952(second printing 1954)
- Brown, Thomas Allston, A History of the New York Stage from the First Performance in 1732 to 1901, Volume III, New York: Dodd, Mead & Company, 1903.
- Moses, Montrose J., "Famous Families of American Players: No. 3 - The Hacketts", The Theatre Magazine, v.V n.47, January 1905, pp. 13–16.
- William Winter, The Wallet of Time, (two volumes, New York, 1913)
