= American Academy of Dramatic Arts =

Private performing arts conservatory

Coordinates: 40.7455°N 73.9847°W

- Type: Private drama school
- Established: 1884
- Founder: Franklin Haven Sargent
- Affiliations: NAICU, MSA
- Endowment: Approx. $5 million
- President: Susan Zech
- Faculty: New York total: 39 (31 of 39 part time); Los Angeles total: 50 (41 of 50 part-time)
- Administrative staff: New York: 39; Los Angeles: 39
- Students: New York: 524; Los Angeles: 303
- Other students: Summer Intensives
- Location: New York City and Los Angeles, United States
- Campus: Urban
- Colors: Gold and Black
- Website: www.aada.edu
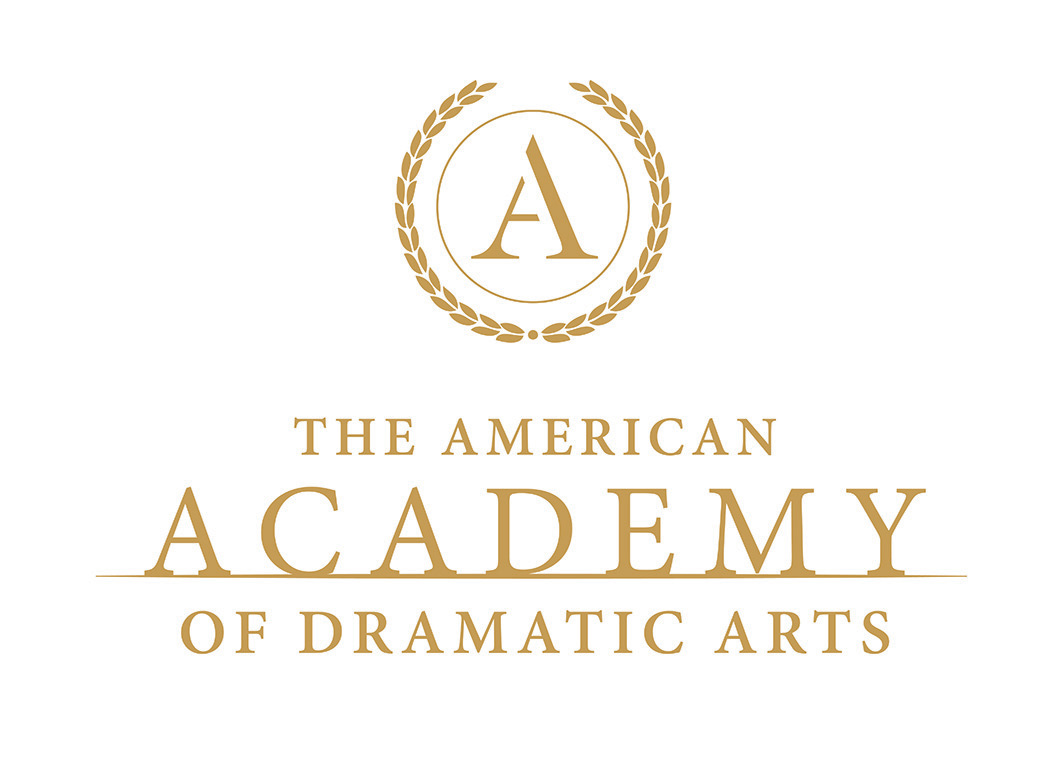

The American Academy of Dramatic Arts (AADA) is a private drama school with one location in New York City; it formerly had another location in Los Angeles. The academy offers an associate degree in occupational studies and teaches drama and related arts in the areas of theater, film, and television. Students also have the opportunity to audition for the third-year theater company, which showcases upcoming talent to the school and community. Students can usually transfer completed credits to another college or university to finish a bachelor's degree if they choose.

== History ==
The academy in New York City was founded in 1884 by Franklin Haven Sargent, a graduate of Harvard University and professor of speech and elocution at his alma mater. Sargent's vision was to establish a school to train actors for the stage. Its first home was the original Lyceum Theatre on what is now Park Avenue South. In 1963, the school moved to its current home, a landmark building designed by the American Renaissance architect Stanford White for the Colony Club.

In 1974, the academy opened another campus in Pasadena, California, which made it the only professional actor-training school in both major centers of American entertainment. The Los Angeles campus moved from Pasadena to Hollywood in 2001, in a new building next to the Jim Henson Company Lot. In April 2024, the academy announced the closure of the Los Angeles campus after the 2024–2025 academic year due to declining enrollment and financial pressures.

== Academics ==
The academy remains dedicated to training professional actors. It offers a two-year program in which students have to be invited back for the second year. Auditions are held at the end of the second year for the third-year company. As well as training for the theatre, it now offers courses in film and television, providing a structured, professionally oriented program that stresses self-discovery, self-discipline and individuality. Students who graduate in New York receive an Associate of Occupational Studies degree; students who graduated in Hollywood received a Certificate of Completion or an Associate of Arts degree in acting.

Numerous students of the academy have gone on to have notable careers in the entertainment industry.
