= Robert Drouet =

American actor

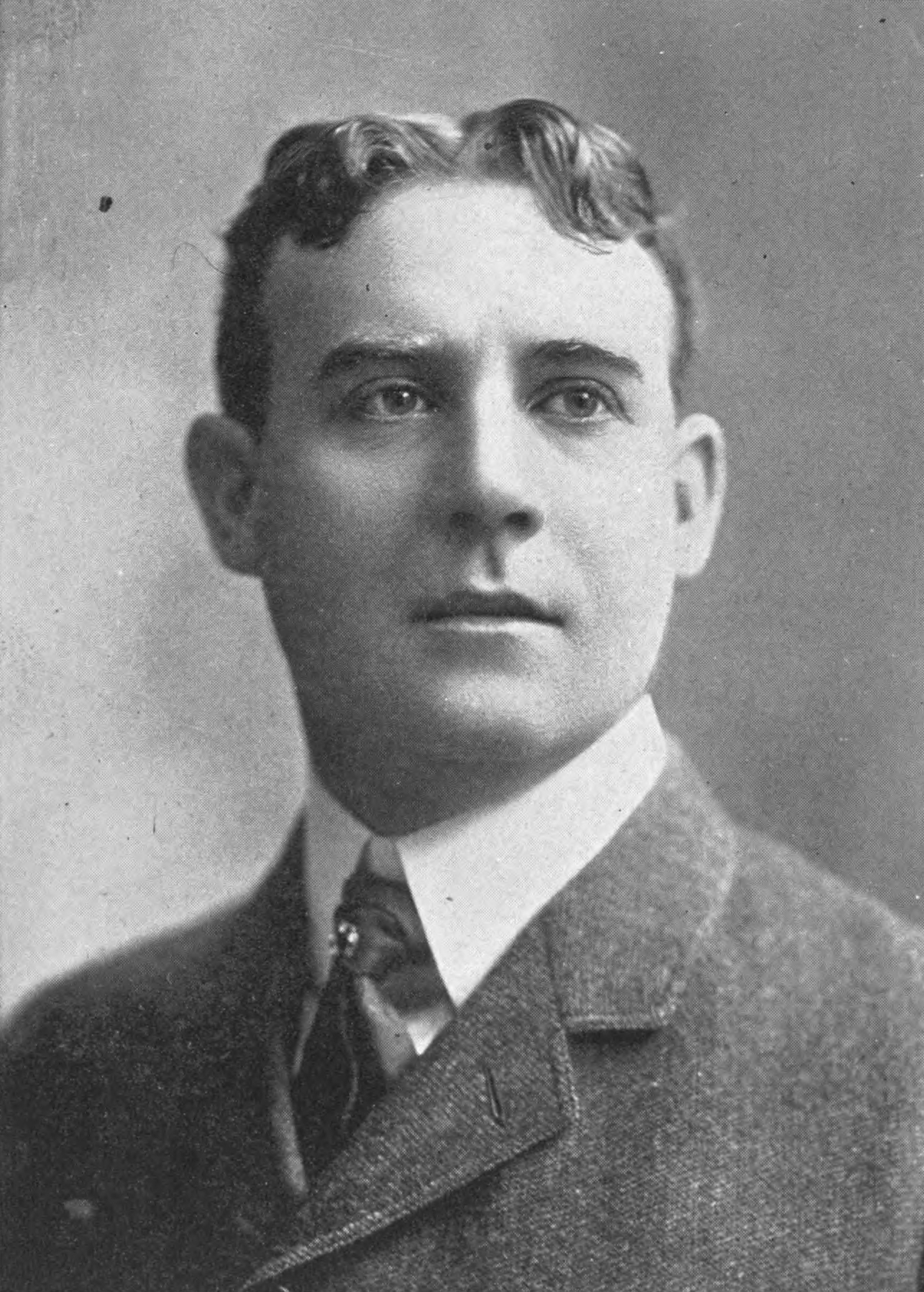
Portrait of Robert Drouet.

Robert Drouet (March 27, 1870 – August 17, 1914) was an American actor and playwright.

Robert Drouet (probably a stage name), was born in Clinton, Iowa. He married Mildred Loring, daughter of M. A. Loring, October 1897, and died in New York City from heart disease.

Drouet joined a theatrical company at 16 and later took out his own Shakespearean repertoire company. For two years he played leading parts with Robert Downing, then created the part of General Delarouche in Paul Kaubar. Drouet played Citizen Pierre in a Charles Coghlan play of the same name (1899) and Colonel Jack Brereton in a drama based on Paul Leicester Ford's novel Janice Meredith. In this four-act play, which opened in 1900, Drouet played the lead, opposite Mary Mannering debut in the title role. He next appeared in two Clyde Fitch hits: He created the chief character, John Austin, in The Girl With the Green Eyes, which ran 108 performances at the Savoy Theatre in New York beginning in 1902. For August 1903, Drouet performed as the leading man at Denver's Elitch Theatre in four weekly productions with leading lady, Percy Haswell. He gave 89 performances of The Woman in the Case at the Herald Square Theatre in 1905. Fitch was one of the most celebrated playwrights of the day.

Among Drouet's other performances as an actor were The Measure of a Man (1906), Genesee of the Hills, 1907, The Mills of the Gods by George Broadhurst (1907), The Stronger Sex with Annie Russell (1908), The Conflict (1909), and Madame X, a tremendous hit of 1910.

As a playwright Robert Drouet authored seven works: Doris (produced in New York 1895, revival 1899), The White Czar, Montana, Tomorrow, An Idyll of Virginia, Fra Diano, and Captain Bob.

== See also ==
- Clyde Fitch
- Mary Mannering
- Annie Russell
