= Blanche Whiffen =

English-born American actress (1845–1936)

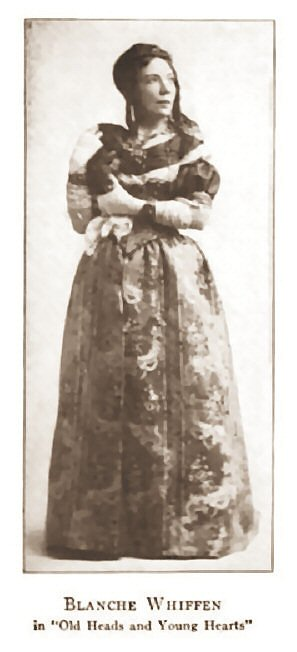
- Old Heads and Young Hearts ca. 1891
- Born: Blanche Galton; 1845; London, England
- Died: 1936 (aged 90–91)
- Occupation: Stage actress
- Spouse: Thomas Whiffen

Blanche Galton Whiffen, known on stage as Mrs. Thomas Whiffen, (born Blanche Galton, March 12, 1845 – November 26, 1936) was an English-born American actress and opera singer. Born in London, she was a member of the Galton family of opera singers, and was trained in that profession by her mother as a contralto. She was educated in boarding schools in England and France, and made her stage début at the Royalty Theatre, London, in 1865. She performed in her aunt's opera troupe in her early career.

In 1868 Blanche married the actor Thomas Whiffen shortly before coming to America on tour in an opera company led by her sister and brother-in-law. With this organization she made her Broadway debut in Jacques Offenbach's opera The Marriage by Lanterns. After this she toured the United States in a variety of opera companies, and in 1879 played Buttercup in the first American production of Gilbert and Sullivan's Pinafore. In her later career she specialized in portraying old ladies in stage plays. Her last performance was in 1930 in Trelawny of the "Wells".

== Early and career in England ==
The daughter of Joseph West Galton and Mary Ann Pyne Galton, Blanche Galton was born on March 12, 1845 in London, England. Her father worked as a clerk at the General Post Office, London until his death when Blanche was six years old. Her mother was an opera singer who trained Blanche in the art of singing when she wasn't away at boarding school. Her mother's sister was the English soprano Louisa Pyne, and her grandfather was the singer George Griggs Pyne. Her aunt Susan Pyne was also an opera singer, and her cousin was the organist James Kendrick Pyne. Blanche attended a variety of schools; ultimately completing her education in France. One of the schools she attended was operated by the sister of actor Charles Kean.

Blanche made her stage debut in London at the Royalty Theatre in 1865 as a fairy in the burlesque Turco the Terrible. In her early career she was a member of the Pyne & Harrison Opera Company; an opera organization operated by her aunt Louisa and William Harrison. She performed minor parts with this company on tour in the British provinces. She was billed as a contralto.

== Life and career in the United States ==
In London Blanche met the actor Thomas Whiffen whom she married in England on July 11, 1868. Later that year she and her husband came to the United States on tour with the Galton Opera Company; an opera company led by her sister as its leading soprano and her sister's husband as its leading tenor. In America she was known on the stage as Mrs. Thomas Whiffen. Her first performance in the U.S. was in Jacques Offenbach's The Marriage By Lanterns on Broadway at Wood's Museum in New York City. After this she toured the U.S. in various opera companies; including those managed by John Templeton and Horace Lingard among others.

In 1879 Mrs. Thomas Whiffen played Buttercup in the first American production of Gilbert and Sullivan's Pinafore. She joined Daniel Frohman's stock company at his old Lyceum Theatre, where she appeared in more than 25 plays between 1887 and 1899 including The Wife (1887), The Charity Ball (1889), and Trelawny of the "Wells" (1898). Later she was part of Charles Frohman's company at the Empire. She became Broadway's resident old lady character player after the death of Mrs. G. H. Gilbert in 1904. Mrs Whiffen in later years appeared in Zira (1905); The Great Divide (1905–07); The Builder of Bridges (1909); The Brass Bottle (1910); Electricity (1910); Cousin Kate (1912); Tante (1913); A Scrap of Paper (1914); Rosemary (1915). Her final performance on the stage was in 1930 in Trelawny of the "Wells" in New York City.

Blanche Whiffen died in Montvale, Virginia on November 26, 1936.

== Bibliography ==
- Brown, Thomas Allston (1903). A History of the New York Stage from the First Performance in 1732 to 1901. Vol. III. Dodd, Mead & Company.
- Chapman, John; Sherwood, Garrison P., eds. (1955). The Best Plays of 1894–1899. New York: Dodd, Mead & Company.
- Fisher, James; Londré, Felicia Hardison (2009). "Whiffen, Mrs. Thomas (1845–1936". The A to Z of American Theater: Modernism. Scarecrow Press. ISBN 9780810868847.
- Hines, Dixie; Hanaford, Harry Prescott, eds. (1914). "Whiffen, Mrs. Thomas". Who's who in Music and Drama. H.P. Hanaford.
- Litoff, Judy Barrett; McDonnell, Judith (1994). European Immigrant Women in the United States: A Biographical Dictionary. Garland Publishing. ISBN 9780824053062.
- Vazzana, Eugene Michael (1995). Silent Film Necrology: Births and Deaths of Over 9000 Performers, Directors, Producers, and Other Filmmakers of the Silent Era, Through 1993. McFarland & Company. ISBN 9780786401321.
