= Julie Opp =

19th-20th century American journalist turned stage actress

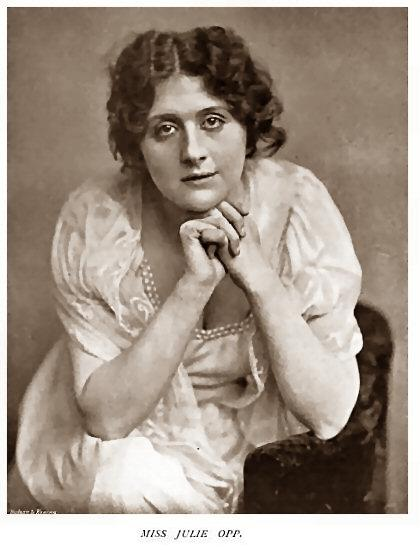
- Country Life, 1900
- Born: January 28, 1871; New York City
- Died: April 9, 1921 (aged 50); New York City
- Other name: Julie Opp Faversham
- Occupations: Stage actor; author; journalist
- Spouse(s): Robert Loraine; William Faversham
- Children: 2 (with Faversham)

Julie Opp (January 28, 1871 – April 9, 1921) was an American stage actress who was for a number of years popular on both sides of the Atlantic Ocean. She was the wife of the Anglo-American actor William Faversham, whom she married shortly after the two co-starred in the 1902 Broadway production, The Royal Rival.

== Biography ==
Julie (sometimes spelled Julia) Opp was born in New York City on January 28, 1871, the daughter of John "Johnny" and Mary Opp. Johnny Opp, the son of Bavarian immigrants, ran a saloon on Lower Manhattan's Bowery and was also active in local neighborhood politics. Mary Dwyer, a first generation Irish-American, was some thirteen years her husband's junior and in her late teens when Julie was born. As a child Opp attended public school for a time before her mother decided it best she was educated at a local convent. There she astounded the sisters and amused a bishop by declaring her ambition to become a ballet dancer when he asked what she wanted to be when she grew up. By the time of her graduation, journalism had replaced ballet, and with the help of a friend she became a fashion writer for the New York Recorder. Her work as a journalist eventually brought Opp within close orbit of many in the theater world and some, including Sarah Bernhardt and Emma Calvé, tried to convince her to become an actress. She later played a minor role in a one-off performance of Camille and on occasions did dramatic readings at social affairs, but when playwright George du Maurier offered her a role in the original 1895 production of Trilby she turned him down, still not ready to abandon her chosen profession. It was the wife of British actor George Alexander who in 1896 finally convinced Opp to take to the boards with Alexander's company playing Hymen in Shakespeare's As You Like It at London's St. James's Theatre.

Of her performance, the London publication To-Day wrote:

Tall and queenly, she is not of the languid or soulless type; she charms you with a versatility ripened by a successful literary career, and she never fails to give you proof that she is equipped for the performance of brilliant work, either on the press or stage.

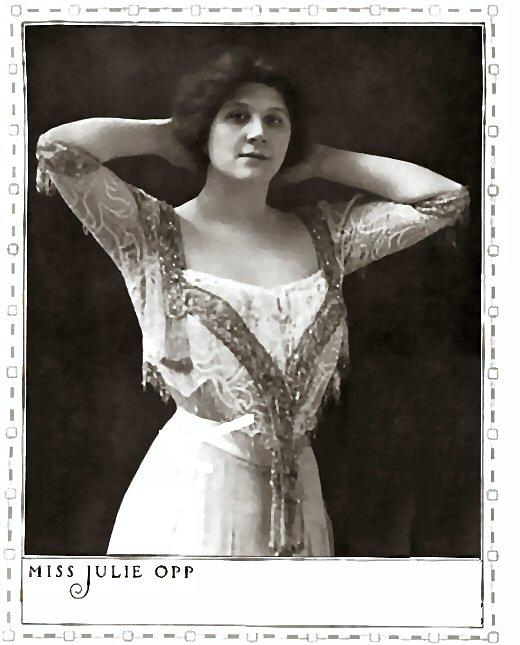
Julie Opp The American Stage of To-Day, 1910

Julie Opp later replaced Julia Neilson as Rosalind after the actress' departure from As You like it and a few months afterwards assumed the lead role Princess Pannonia in Pinero's The Princess and the Butterfly when Neilson retired from that production. The following year Julie Opp married British actor Robert Loraine (November 7, 1897) and sailed to America where on November 23, she made her New York debut at the Lyceum Theater reprising her role in a Daniel Frohman production of The Princess and the Butterfly and the following year as Belle in R. C. Carton's The Tree of Knowledge.

She returned to England in 1900 to perform with Alexander's company for several seasons in productions of Anthony Hope's Rupert of Hentzau, playing Holf; Hope's The Prisoner of Zenda, as Antoinette de Mauban; Walter Frith's The Man of Forty, as Mrs. Egerton; Pearl Craigie's The Wisdom of the Wise, in the role of Annabel East; Charles Haddon Chambers' The Awakening, playing Mrs. Herbertson; and Henry V. Esmond's The Wilderness, taking the part of Edith Thorold. Opp return to New York in 1902 to play opposite William Faversham in The Royal Rival, an adaptation of Jules Massenet's Don Caesar de Kazan by Gerald du Maurier in which she assumed the role of Marlta.

In 1902 she received a divorce from Loraine and on December 29 of that year married William Faversham, a British actor who would go on to have a long career in America. Over the years the couple would appear together in such play as R. C. Carton's Lord and Lady Algy, Edwin Milton Royle's Squaw Man, Charles Frederick Nirdlinger's The World and His Wife, Edward Childs Carpenter's The Barber of Orleans, Stephen Phillips' Herod and Edward Knoblock's The Faun. In 1906 Julie Opp published The Squaw Man: a Novel, taken from the play by Edwin Royle.

Julie Opp fell seriously ill in 1914 while traveling abroad with her husband and two sons. By autumn she seemed to have recovered her health and returned to the stage with Faversham in The Hawk by Francis de Croisset and Marie Zane Taylor (English translation). She soon suffered a relapse and was forced to withdraw from the production that would prove to be the last of her career.

She spent her remaining years dividing her time between their residence in New York City and a country home on Long Island. Julie Opp died after a failed operation at the Post Graduate Hospital on April 9, 1921. She was survived by her husband and sons, William Jr. (born 1905) and Phillip (born 1907).
