= Adelaide Keim =

American actress (1879–1946)

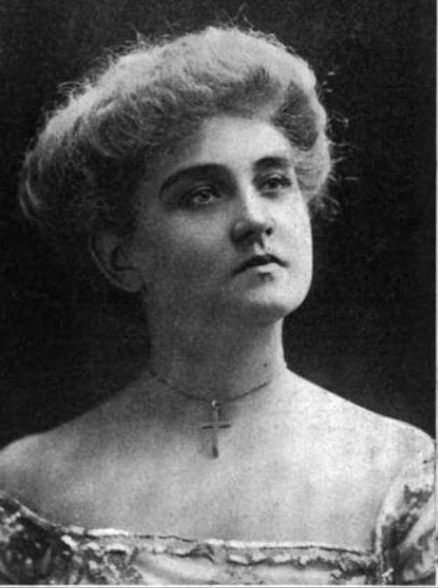
- Adelaide Keim, from a 1905 publication
- Born: February 15, 1879; New York City
- Died: June 25, 1946 (aged 67)
- Other name: Adelaide Murnane
- Occupation: Actress

Adelaide Augusta Keim (February 15, 1879 – June 25, 1946) was an American Broadway and vaudeville actress. She was known for playing the male title character in Hamlet in several American cities in 1905.

== Early life ==
Keim was born in New York City, the daughter of Henry (Harry) Grant Keim and Mary Agnes Morrissey Keim. Her father, a milliner by trade, was her manager and manager of the Harlem Opera House. Her younger brother Chauncey Keim became a theatrical producer. Keim attended St. Joseph's Academy in New York.

== Career ==
Keim began her stage career in 1898, managed by Daniel Frohman and appearing at his Lyceum Theatre. She performed at other theaters, such as the Garden Theatre, Fifth Avenue Theatre, and the Bijou Theatre.

In 1905, Keim played the title role in Hamlet in Baltimore, New York, and Chicago. "Miss Keim gave a thoughtful, impressive rendering of the Prince," said George C. Jenks in 1905, "but somehow you never could forget that it was a woman in man's clothes and not the young man you were supposed to be looking at."

Keim's Broadway credits included roles in Trelawny of the 'Wells' (1898), At the White Horse Tavern and Twelve Months Later (1900), Terence (1904), The Prince of India (1906), and The Right to Happiness (1912). She was also active in touring stock companies and on the vaudeville stage. "I love the stage and would rather act than do anything else in the world," she once told a Buffalo newspaper.

In 1918, she starred in Kate Douglas Wiggin's Mother Carey's Chickens in Maine.

== Personal life ==
Keim was involved with her Proctor's Theatre costar Ned Howard Fowler until her parents intervened in 1903. Both actors ended up moving to other stock companies. She married another fellow actor, Allan Louis Murnane, in 1910. They lived in New Rochelle, New York, and had two children together. She died in 1946, in her sixties.
