= Birds of Prey (1930 film) =

1930 British film by Basil Dean

- Directed by: Basil Dean; John E. Burch (assistant)
- Written by: A.A. Milne; Basil Dean
- Produced by: Basil Dean
- Starring: Dorothy Boyd; Robert Loraine; Warwick Ward; C. Aubrey Smith; Frank Lawton
- Cinematography: Jack MacKenzie; Robert G. Martin
- Edited by: Jack Kitchin
- Music by: Ernest Irving
- Production company: Associated Talking Pictures
- Distributed by: RKO Pictures
- Release dates: 18 November 1930 (Premiere-UK); 1 April 1931 (US)
- Running time: 98 minutes
- Country: United Kingdom
- Language: English

Birds of Prey (U.S. title: The Perfect Alibi) is a 1930 British mystery film directed and produced by Basil Dean and starring Dorothy Boyd, Robert Loraine, Warwick Ward, C. Aubrey Smith, Frank Lawton, and Robert Loraine. It was written by Dean and A.A. Milne from Milne's play The Fourth Wall (U.S. title: The Perfect Alibi ), and made at Beaconsfield Studios by Associated Talking Pictures.

== Plot ==
At his country estate, Arthur Hilton is regaling his dinner guests with his exploits as a police officer decades earlier in Africa. He keys in a case where he had to track down a gang of three men who were suspected of a series of murders. He comes across them, but they end up capturing him. Fortunately, he was able to talk his way out of that predicament, and later tracked them down again and captured them. One was hanged for his crimes, while the other two were sentenced to twenty years in prison.

Little does Hilton know that two of his dinner guests, Edward Laverick and Edward Carter, are the two men he sent to prison. They have vowed revenge, and prior to dinner, they exact it, killing Hilton. However, they have planned it to look like a suicide on the part of the elderly aristocrat. Their plot initially seems successful, as the local constables who arrive to investigate the incident believe the suicide scenario.

Hilton's nephew, Jimmy Hilton, and his girlfriend Mollie, who also happens to be the ward of the elder Hilton, become suspicious of the story told by the two men, and begin their own investigation. Their questioning leads them to arrive at the truth, and the two murderers are apprehended.

== Cast ==
- Dorothy Boyd as Mollie Cunningham
- Nigel Bruce as Major Fothergill
- Audrey Carten as Jane
- David Hawthorne as Sergeant Joe Mallet
- Ellis Jeffreys as Elizabeth Green
- Robert Loraine as Edward Pontifex Carter
- Frank Lawton as Jimmy Hilton
- Tom Reynolds as Police Constable Mallet
- C. Aubrey Smith as Arthur Hilton
- Warwick Ward as Edward Laverick
- Jack Hawkins as Alfred

(Cast list as per AFI and BFI databases)

== Reception ==
Film Weekly wrote: "Despite the fact that The Fourth Wall, the play from which this film was adapted, is well-written thriller, the talkie misses the mark. An extremely badly constructed scenario seems to be the prime cause of the picture's failure to entertain. The plot is confused and rambling and the story lacks the 'kick' that the play had. In the face of this handicap the actors are unable to give the good performances their names entitle one to expect of them."

Kine Weekly wrote: "In this adaptation of A. A. Milne's successful mystery play The Fourth Wall, Basil Dean, the producer, has confused the issue and robbed many of the dramatic situations of their intensity by the introduction of irrelevant side issues. As he never seems to make a his mind whether to treat the subject seriously or not, the drama lacks conviction. Iowever, the strong stage cast do extremely well in the circumstances, the English atmosphere is refreshing, and the dialogue is well above the average. ... Although the picture lacks subtlety and smoothness, it is not without its good moments, and would, if judiciously cut, make quite an attractive booking. The recording and photography are at times far from satisfactory."

Mordaunt Hall of The New York Times gave the film a mediocre review, praising several of the players, particularly Smith and Ward, while questioning the abilities of some of the other actors, such as Loraine. He felt the direction was uneven, stating the overall production, "may not be endowed with imaginative direction, but, because of the author's intriguing story and C. Aubrey Smith's excellent performance, it succeeds in being an entertaining study of a cool, calculating murderer".

Variety wrote: "The whole trouble with Basil Dean as a picture producer is that he appears to have precisely no idea of the makings of a picture. In this particular specimen of the Dean leisureliness, he is backed by all the smooth efficiency of American technicians, has art direction which knocks most British films galley-west, has a camera team which beats most of the grinders this side, and a cast of stage players of whom the more mature troupers can always be depended upon to give sterling performances. And the most he gets, out of this line-up, is a slow moving series of photographed sequences, with players mouthing melodramatic lines in a melodramatic fashion and a lot of hokum dialog which it seems unfair to blame on A. A. Milne."

== Notes ==
Rupert Downing also contributed to the screenplay. The film's art direction was by Clifford Pember. Jack Hawkins made his screen debut in this film.

The play on which this film is based was produced in London at the Haymarket Theatre in 1928. The play, under the title, The Perfect Alibi, was produced on Broadway at the Charles Hopkins Theatre from November 1928 through July 1929.
