= The Man Who Lost Himself (novel) =

1918 novel

- First edition
- Author: Henry De Vere Stacpoole
- Language: English
- Genre: Comedy drama
- Publisher: Hutchinson
- Publication date: 1918
- Publication place: United Kingdom
- Media type: Print

The Man Who Lost Himself is a 1918 comedy drama novel by the Irish-born writer Henry De Vere Stacpoole. The plot revolves around an American from Philadelphia, Victor Jones, arriving in London to find himself the exact Doppelgänger of a British aristocrat.

== Film adaptations ==
In 1920 it was made into an American silent film The Man Who Lost Himself directed by Clarence G. Badger and featuring William Faversham and Hedda Hopper. It was later remade as a 1941 film of the same title directed by Edward Ludwig and starring Brian Aherne and Kay Francis.

== Sources ==
- Goble, Alan. The Complete Index to Literary Sources in Film. Walter de Gruyter, 1999. ISBN 978-3-11-095194-3.
- Loeber, Rolf, Stouthamer-Loeber, Magda & Burnham, Anne Mullin. A Guide to Irish Fiction, 1650-1900. Four Courts, 2006.
