= Jane E. Bartlett =

American painter (1839–1923)

Jane E. Bartlett (1839 – 1923) was an American portraitist.

== Biography ==
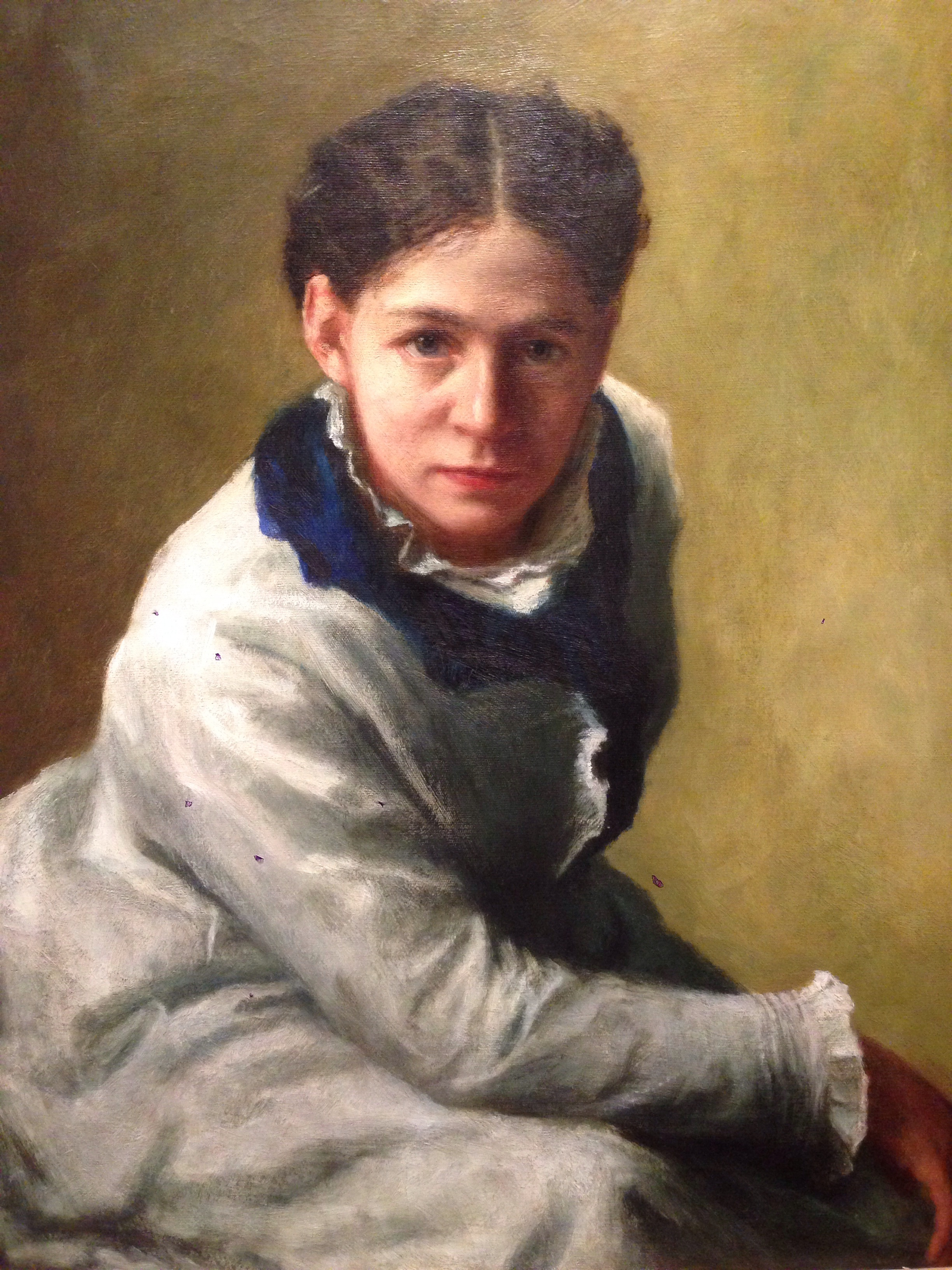
Portrait of Sarah Cowell Le Moyne by Jane E. Bartlett, 1877

Bartlett was born in Harmony, Maine. She studied under William Morris Hunt in Boston in the late 1860s. She developed a style of portraiture based on the principles he taught, including a spontaneous approach and a lack of trivial detail. She lived in Colorado and Minnesota before returning to Boston in 1877, where she worked out of a studio at 17 South Russell Street until 1887.

After 1887, she continued to paint in Boston in both the Irvington Street Studio Building and the Harcourt Building. In 1907 she was commissioned by the Kansas State Agricultural College to paint portraits of its college presidents.

== Awards and recognition ==
Bartlett exhibited two works at the Philadelphia Centennial Exhibition in 1876, and was awarded a silver medal at the Massachusetts Mechanics' Fair in 1880. Contemporary critics praised Bartlett for having a "fresh, strong hand and hearty, unaffected way of seeing and painting things," and for her "strong heads, bold and masculine in untormented color and confident handling."

Bartlett's portrait of the actress Sarah Cowell Le Moyne is on display at the Brooklyn Museum.

== See also ==
- List of 20th-century women artists
