= Robert Loraine =

British actor, manager and soldier (1876– 1935)

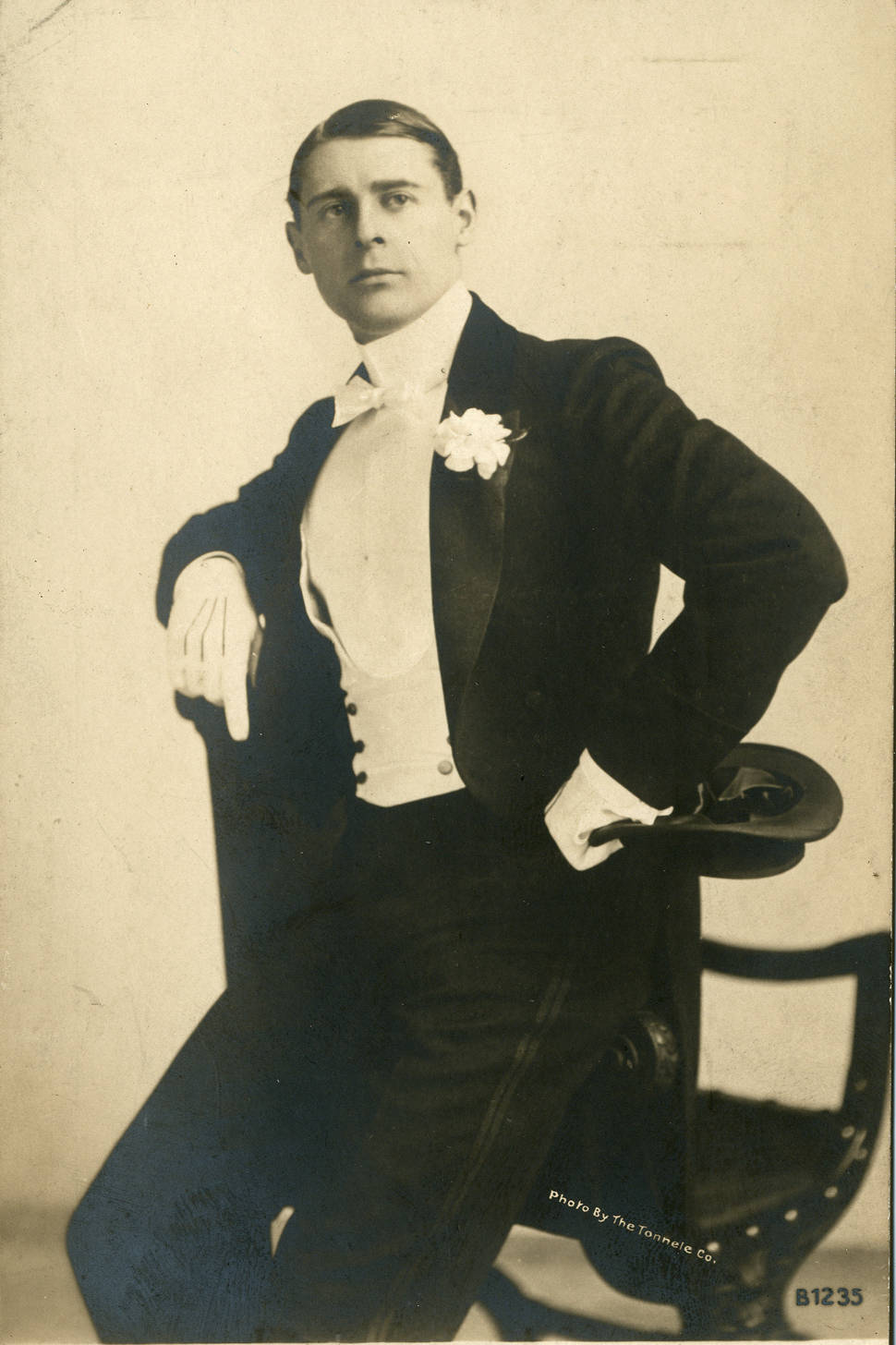
- Born: Robert Bilcliffe Loraine; 14 January 1876; New Brighton, Liscard, Cheshire, England
- Died: 23 December 1935 (aged 59); London, England
- Occupations: actor soldier actor-manager aviator
- Years active: 1889–1935
- Spouses: Julie Opp (m. 1897; div. 1901) Winifred Lydia Strangman (m. 1921)
- Awards: Distinguished Service Order; Military Cross

Robert Bilcliffe Loraine DSO, MC (14 January 1876 – 23 December 1935) was a successful London and Broadway British stage actor, actor-manager, and soldier who later enjoyed a side career as a pioneer aviator. Born in New Brighton, his father was Henry Loraine and mother Edith Kingsley (born Mary Ellen Bayliss). Robert made his first stage appearance in the English provinces in 1889, prior to serving in the Second Boer War. He introduced the George Bernard Shaw play Man and Superman to Broadway in 1905.

== Theatrical career ==
Loraine was a versatile actor and was successful both in serious plays and in popular works of light entertainment. He was particularly associated with the works of George Bernard Shaw, taking over the role of John Tanner from Harley Granville Barker in the fourth run of Man and Superman at the Royal Court Theatre. He also won critical acclaim for performances in plays by William Shakespeare and August Strindberg.

== Aviation ==
In 1909 Loraine took up the new technology of aviation, learning first to fly at the Bleriot school at Pau, France. He then switched to the easier to fly Farman biplane, on which he achieved great fame. In September 1910 he made what is credited as being the first aeroplane flight from England to Ireland, although he actually came down in the sea about 200 feet (60 metres) from the shore. The same month he piloted one of the two Bristol Boxkites which took part in the British Army manoeuvres on Salisbury Plain, during which he transmitted the first radio signals to be sent from an aeroplane in Britain. His diary is cited by the Oxford English Dictionary as the first written example of the word joystick to describe aircraft stick controls.

== Military career ==
Loraine served as a volunteer in the Second Boer War between 1899 and 1901. During the First World War, he flew with the Royal Flying Corps (RFC). Formerly a lieutenant in the Special Reserve serving as a flying officer RFC, he was appointed to be a flight commander with the rank of captain on 15 September 1915. He was awarded the Military Cross for his "conspicuous gallantry and skill" in shooting down an Albatross biplane on 26 October 1915. On 24 April 1916 he was promoted to command a squadron, with the rank of major, and on 13 February 1917 he was appointed a wing commander, with the rank of lieutenant colonel; he was awarded the Distinguished Service Order the same year "for distinguished service in the field". He was twice seriously wounded, and commanded No. 40 Squadron. During his service he did not entirely abandon the theatre, running a drama society in his squadron, which performed the premiere performance of Shaw's play O'Flaherty V.C. at Treizeenes in Belgium. On 11 December 1918, he relinquished his commission in the Royal Air Force due to ill-health brought on by his wounds, and was granted the honorary rank of major.

Loraine had a great deal in common with Reginald Denny, a younger British actor/airman. They had been in a West End production together in 1902 in London, they were both veterans of the RFC (and its successor, the Royal Air Force) and were both flying and making films in Hollywood in the 1930s. Each of them visited their close relatives in the same area of London. At Loraine's wedding in 1921, his best man was an Air-Commodore Duncan le Geyt Pitcher who had been in charge of the RFC radio control weapons and developed the first powered drone aircraft. Denny became interested in radio controlled aircraft and started the first US military drone work at the start of WWII.

== Personal life ==
On 7 November 1897 Loraine married Julie Opp. After their divorce he married Winifred Lydia, daughter of Sir Thomas Strangman in 1921. Loraine's best man was an old RFC colleague Duncan Pitcher They had three daughters. Robert returned from New York on the new luxury liner SS Normandie and arrived in Plymouth on the 14 October 1935. He was due to play Ebenezer Scrooge in a broadcast that Christmas but died quite suddenly after being admitted to hospital on 23 December in London.

== Biography ==
Loraine's life is the subject of Lanayre D. Liggera's biography The Life of Robert Loraine:The Stage, the Sky, and George Bernard Shaw c.2013. and in 'The Dawn of the Drone'.

== Selected filmography ==
- Bentley's Conscience (1922)
- S.O.S. (1928)
- Birds of Prey (1930)
- Outcast Lady (1934)
- Marie Galante (1934)
- Father Brown, Detective (1934)
