= The Moth and the Flame (1915 film) =

1915 film by Sidney Olcott

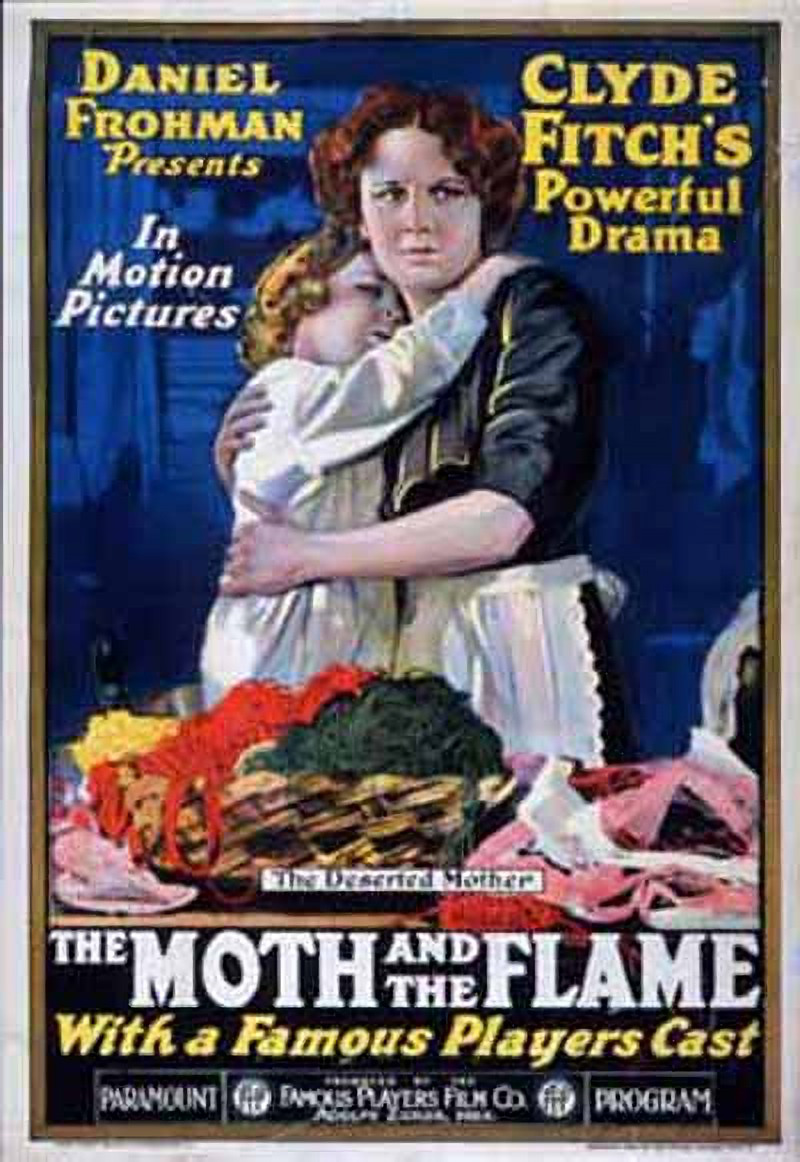
- Poster
- Directed by: Sidney Olcott
- Based on: The Moth and the Flame by Clyde Fitch
- Produced by: Daniel Frohman
- Starring: Stewart Baird
- Distributed by: Paramount Pictures
- Release date: May 13, 1915
- Running time: 5 reels
- Country: United States
- Language: Silent (English intertitles)

The Moth and the Flame is a 1915 American silent drama film produced by Famous Players Film Company and distributed by Paramount Pictures. It was directed by Sidney Olcott and is based upon the play of the same name by Clyde Fitch.

== Cast ==
- Stewart Baird as Edward Fletcher
- Edward Mordant as Mr. Dawson
- Bradley Barker as Douglas Rhodes
- Arthur Donaldson as Mr. Walton
- Adele Rey as Marion Walton (Adele Ray?)
- Dora Mills Adams as Mrs. Walton
- Irene Howley as Jeannette Graham
- Maurice Stewart as Jeannette's child

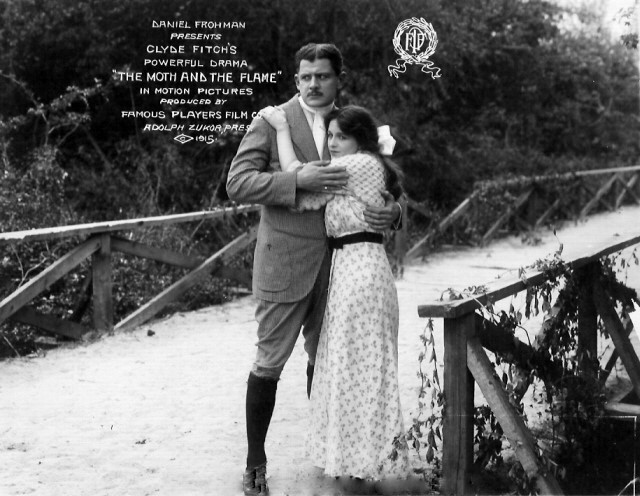
Stuart Baird and Irene Hawley in the film

== Production notes ==
The film was shot in Jacksonville, Florida.

== Themes and reception ==
The film was noted for Adele Ray's costumes (a jupe-culotte and "lampshade" tunic; both Poiret-style designs) in an analysis of glamour and seduction in early film.

Bioscope called the film "a celebrated morality play".
