= Percy Haswell =

American actress

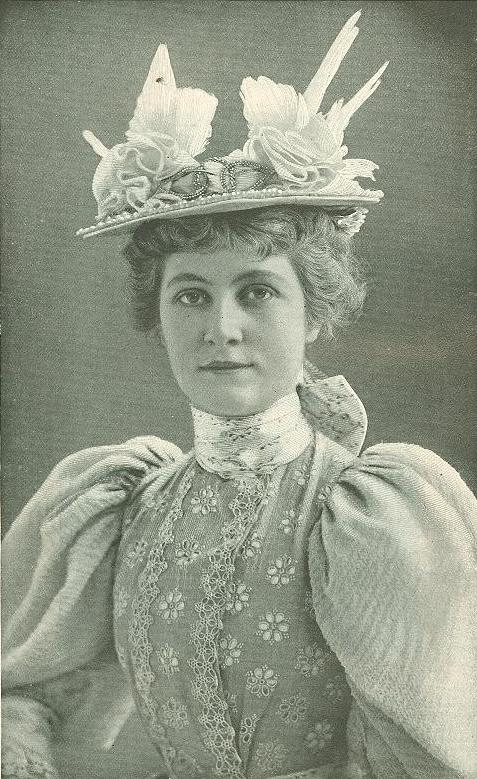
- Haswell, c. 1896
- Born: April 30, 1871; Austin, Texas, U.S.
- Died: June 24, 1945 (aged 74); Nantucket, Massachusetts, U.S.
- Other names: Miss Percy Haswell; Mrs. George Fawcett
- Occupation: Actress
- Spouse: George Fawcett (m. 1895-1939)
- Children: Margaret Fawcett Barnes (1896-1980)

Percy Haswell (April 30, 1871 – June 24, 1945), frequently billed as Miss Percy Haswell or Mrs. George Fawcett to clarify her gender, was an American stage and film actress. Haswell was born in Austin, Texas, the daughter of George Tyler Haswell, a politician and businessman, and Caroline Dalton. She was educated in Washington, D.C., and while still a child she first appeared on the stage in March 1885. She appeared with the Lafayette Square Theatre in Washington and acted in New York City at Augustin Daly's Theatre. Her stage career also included appearances in Baltimore, Boston, Buffalo, Toronto and other locales, as well as New York, where she first appeared on Broadway in 1898, returning periodically through 1932.

On June 2, 1895, at Bridgeport, Connecticut, she married fellow actor George Fawcett. In 1901 at Baltimore she formed the Percy Haswell Stock Company but later took a secondary role to her husband, her company forming a constituent part of the George Fawcett Stock Company. For August 1903, Haswell performed as the leading lady at Denver's Elitch Theatre in four weekly productions with leading man, Robert Drouet. In 1925, she directed the Broadway play, The Complex. She also appeared in two films, 1919 and 1929- in the second she appeared with her husband.

She died at age 74 in Nantucket, Massachusetts, on June 14. 1945, the mother of one daughter.

Writer Fulton Oursler commented, in describing his infatuation with her, that she was "so blonde, so blue-eyed, with voice so throaty sweet. She was a lass from Austin, Texas, but to me she seemed to belong to some other world altogether. She was my first Rosalind, and Juliet, and Ophelia, and a dozen other heroines, sacred and profane."
