= The Man Who Lost Himself (1920 film) =

1920 film by Clarence G. Badger

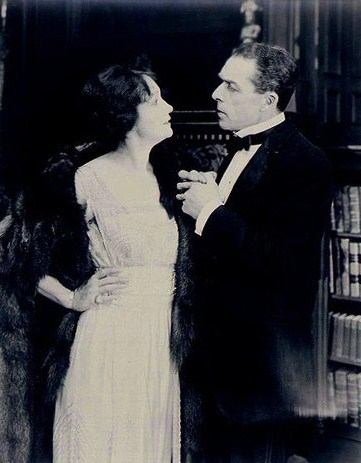
- Hedda Hopper and William Faversham
- Directed by: Clarence G. Badger; George D. Baker
- Written by: George D. Baker
- Based on: The Man Who Lost Himself by Henry De Vere Stacpoole
- Produced by: William Faversham; Lewis J. Selznick
- Starring: William Faversham; Hedda Hopper
- Cinematography: Lucien N. Andriot
- Distributed by: Selznick Pictures
- Release date: May 30, 1920
- Running time: 50 minutes
- Country: United States
- Language: Silent (English intertitles)

The Man Who Lost Himself is a lost 1920 American silent comedy-drama film directed by Clarence G. Badger and George D. Baker. It was produced by its star, stage actor William Faversham, and Lewis J. Selznick. The film is based on the 1918 novel of the same title by Henry De Vere Stacpoole. Faversham plays dual roles of an English nobleman and an American who looks just like him.

The novel was later adapted again for a 1941 remake of the same title starring Brian Aherne and Kay Francis.

== Plot ==
As described in a film magazine, American Victor Jones (Faversham) finds himself penniless and stranded in London. He meets the Earl of Rochester (Faversham), and the similarity between the two is so noticeable that even friends mistake Jones for the Earl. The Earl is estranged from his wife (Hopper) and family, owes great sums of money, and is considered in a bad light by acquaintances. He gets Jones drunk and sends him to the Rochester mansion, and then commits suicide. Until Jones receives a note written by the Earl prior to his death, he does not perceive his position. After reading the note, Jones immediately begins to pose as the Earl, but later reveals this scheme. However, he has fallen in love with the Earl's widow and they decide to reside in the United States.

== Cast ==
- William Faversham as Victor Jones / Earl of Rochester
- Hedda Hopper as Countess of Rochester
- Violet Reed as Lady Plinlimon
- Radcliffe Steele as Sir Patrick Spence
- Claude Payton as Prince Maniloff
- Mathilde Brundage as Rochester's Mother
- Emily Fitzroy as Rochester's Aunt
- Downing Clarke as Rochester's Uncle

== Reception ==
According to The New York Times reviewer, provided the viewer could accept that an American, with no prior knowledge of the Englishman's life, could pass for him, "Any one disposed to make the necessary assumptions may, and undoubtedly will, enjoy the photoplay, for the two leading rôles are played by William Faversham with unfailing pantomimic ability and sureness of characterization."
