= The Moth and the Flame (play) =

The Moth and the Flame is a play in three acts by Clyde Fitch and Alice Kauser. It was adapted into a 1915 silent film of the same name.

== History ==
The Moth and the Flame began its life on the stage with Fitch's earlier one act play The Harvest which was given its premiere performance by the Theatre of Arts and Letters company at the Fifth Avenue Theatre on Broadway on January 26, 1893. This play told the story of a bride who discovers during her wedding ceremony that her husband-to-be has fathered a child out of wedlock with another woman. It became the second act of The Moth and the Flame; and this three act play premiered on Broadway at Steele MacKaye's Lyceum Theatre on April 11, 1898. The premiere production was directed by Daniel Frohman and performed by the Herbert Kelcey—Effie Shannon Theatre Company with Shannon in the role of Marion Wolton and Kelcey as Fletcher; roles which these actors had portrayed earlier in The Harvest.

The Moth and the Flame received mixed reviews from critics, but was a popular and financial success. The Kelecey and Shannon Theatre Company toured the play nationally for many years. The play was published in Montrose Jonas Moses's Representative Plays by American Dramatists, Volume 3 (1918) and was later digitized by Project Gutenberg.

The Moth and the Flame was adapted into a film produced in 1915 by Famous Players, distributed by Paramount, and directed by Sidney Olcott, starring Steward Baird, Edward Mordant, and Irene Howley.
