= Loren Keim =

American author and editor

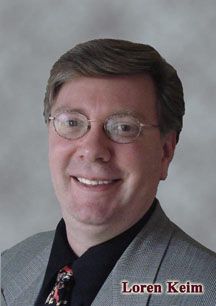
- Occupations: Author, Speaker, Realtor

Loren Keim is an American author and editor of several magazines.

== Career ==
He has authored books about real estate, including How to Sell Your Home in Any Market, The Fundamentals of Commercial Real Estate and Real Estate Prospecting: The Ultimate Resource, as well as training systems for realtors. He is also the editor-in-chief of Real Estate Investment Digest and Pennsylvania Farm & Ranch Magazine, and is a real estate broker and president of Century 21 Keim Realtors in Pennsylvania.

Keim performs economic analysis and housing projections for Lehigh University's Goodman Center in Bethlehem, Pennsylvania. He has appeared on television and radio programs to talk about the housing and real estate markets, and has been a speaker at national conventions. He was also heavily referenced in Donald Trump's Marketing 101 book.

== Bibliography ==
- The Fundamentals of Listing and Selling Commercial Real Estate (2007) ISBN 0-7414-4369-4
- How to Sell Your Home in Any Market: The 6 Reasons Some Homes Don't Sell and How to Fix Them (2008) ISBN 1-57248-698-8
- Real Estate Prospecting: The Ultimate Resource Guide (2008) ISBN 0-7414-4959-5
- Short Sales: Step by Step (2009) ISBN 1-4421-2080-0
- Life Lessons... from the back seat of my car (2010) ISBN 0-578-04868-X
