= Isaac Frederick Marcosson =

American magazine editor (1876–1961)

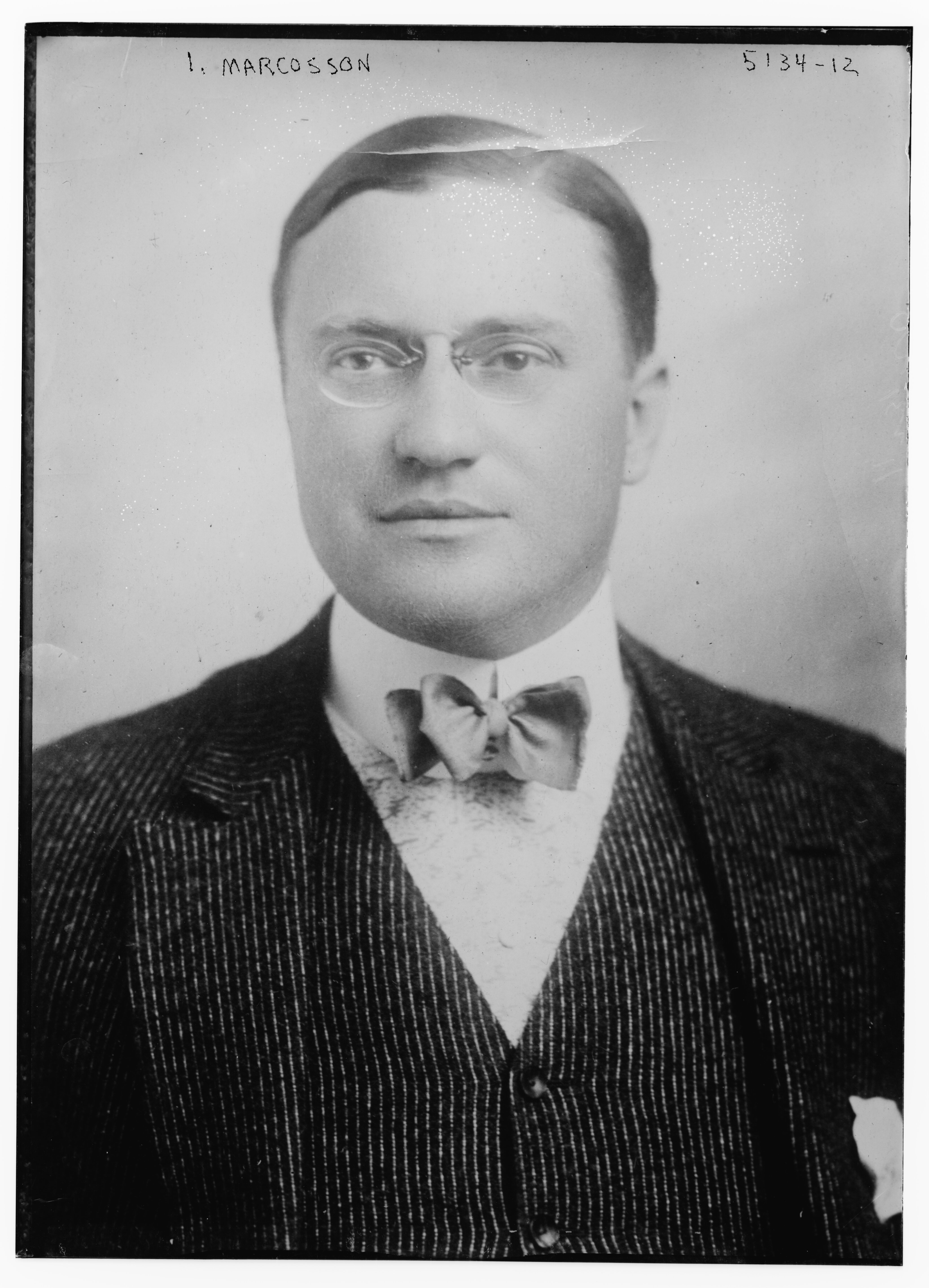
Isaac Frederick Marcosson circa 1920

Isaac Frederick Marcosson (September 13, 1876 - March 14, 1961) was an American magazine editor.

== Biography ==
Marcosson was born in Louisville, Kentucky on September 13, 1876. He was educated in the schools of Louisville.

In 1903, he became associate editor of The World's Work, and in 1907, he became a member and financial editor of The Saturday Evening Post. From 1910 to 1913, he was editor of Munsey's Magazine.

He died on March 14, 1961, at the Doctors Hospital in Manhattan, New York City.

== Works ==
- The Autobiography of a Clown, (1910) (Jules Turnour)
- The War After the War, (1916)
- The Rebirth of Russia, (1917)
- Leonard Wood: The Prophet of Preparedness, (1917)
- The Business of War, (1917)
- Charles Frohman, Manager and Man, with Daniel Frohman, (1917)
- Adventures in Interviewing, (1919)
- S.O.S - America's Miracle in France, (1919)
- Peace and Business, (1919)
- An African Adventure, (1921)
- The Black Golconda: The Romance of Petroleum, (1924)
- Caravans of Commerce, (1926)
- David Graham Phillips and His Times, (1932)
- Turbulent Years, (1938)
- Wherever Men Trade: The Romance of the Cash Register, (1945) (the story of the National Cash Register Company (NCR))
- Colonel Deeds - Industrial Builder, (1947) (Edward Andrew Deeds)
- Metal Magic: The Story of the American Smelting and Refining Company, (1949)
- Anaconda (New York: Dodd, Mead 1957)
