= The Man Who Lost Himself (1941 film) =

1941 film by Edward Ludwig

- Directed by: Edward Ludwig
- Written by: Eddie Moran
- Based on: the novel The Man Who Lost Himself by Henry De Vere Stacpoole
- Produced by: Lawrence W. Fox, Jr.
- Starring: Brian Aherne; Kay Francis; Nils Asther
- Cinematography: Victor Milner
- Edited by: Milton Carruth
- Music by: Hans J. Salter
- Production company: Universal Pictures
- Distributed by: Universal Pictures
- Release date: March 21, 1941
- Running time: 72 minutes
- Country: United States
- Language: English

The Man Who Lost Himself is a 1941 American comedy film directed by Edward Ludwig and starring Brian Aherne, Kay Francis and Nils Asther. Aherne plays a man who encounters his exact double and is later mistaken for the other man who is now dead. The film is based on the novel of the same name by Henry De Vere Stacpoole. The novel was also previously adapted to film in 1920. The new version shifts the setting from London of the original to New York, although it features several British actors.

== Plot ==
Department store mogul Malcolm Scott escapes from a mental institution. At a bar, he encounters lookalike John Evans and they get drunk together.

John wakes up in Malcolm's home, where butler Paul and others mistakenly believe him to be Malcolm. As he attempts to persuade them otherwise, the real Malcolm is killed in a subway accident. Malcolm's estranged wife Adrienne has been romantically involved with Peter Ransome, while it appears Malcolm had been seeing a Mrs. Van Avery while also embezzling from his store with a man named Mulhausen who now wants to buy it from Adrienne.

John foils the scheme, and when a grateful Adrienne finally realizes who he really is, she decides she would like to marry her dead husband's dead ringer.

== Cast ==
- Brian Aherne as John Evans / Malcolm Scott
- Kay Francis as Adrienne Scott
- Henry Stephenson as Frederick Collins
- S. Z. Sakall as Paul
- Nils Asther as Peter Ransome
- Sig Ruman as Dr. Simms
- Dorothy Tree as Mrs. Van Avery
- Janet Beecher as Mrs. Milford
- Marc Lawrence as Frank DeSoto
- Henry Kolker as Mulhausen
- Sarah Padden as Maid
- Eden Gray as Venetia Scott
- Selmer Jackson as Mr. Green
- William Gould as Mr. Ryan
- Russell Hicks as Mr. Van der Girt
- Frederick Burton as Mr. Milford
- Margaret Armstrong as Mrs. Van der Girt
- Wilson Benge as Butler
- Frank O'Connor as cab driver (uncredited)

== Bibliography ==
- Bubbeo, Daniel. The Women of Warner Brothers: The Lives and Careers of 15 Leading Ladies, with Filmographies for Each. McFarland, 2001.
