= Donald Keim =

American economist

Donald B. Keim is an American economist, the John Neff Professor Emeritus of Finance and former Director of the R.L. White Center for Financial Research at Wharton School, University of Pennsylvania.

== Background ==
Born in Bethlehem, Pennsylvania, United States, he received an undergraduate degree from Bucknell University in 1975. He received both his M.B.A. (1980) and Ph.D. (1983) from the University of Chicago Booth School of Business, notably working with his Advisor Eugene Fama and Professors Merton Miller and Myron Scholes.

== Professional career ==
After one year as a lecturer in finance at Loyola University Chicago (1981–82), Keim joined the faculty at Wharton School, University of Pennsylvania in 1982 where he has spent his entire academic career. He turned emeritus in 2021.

Keim has published more than 50 research papers and won numerous awards including the Kenneth L. Trefftzs Award (1982), Graham and Dodd Award (1999), and IRRC Institute Research Award (2015).

In addition to his academic work, Keim served as a consultant to Dimensional Fund Advisors (1985–2012), and was a member of several Academic Advisory Boards. He is currently a member of the Academic Advisory Board of FTSE Group and the Policy Board of WXPN.
