= William Faversham =

American actor (1868–1940)

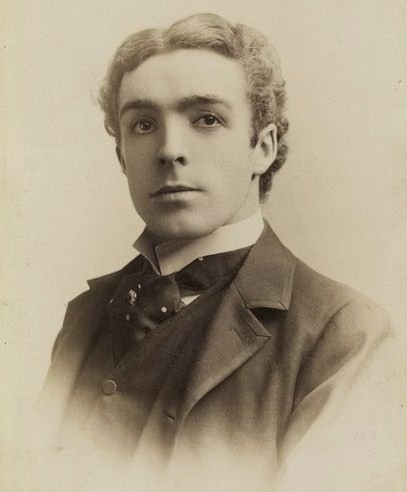
- Faversham in 1907
- Born: 12 February 1868; London, England
- Died: 7 April 1940 (aged 72); Long Island, New York
- Occupation: Producer / Stage actor
- Spouse: Julie Opp

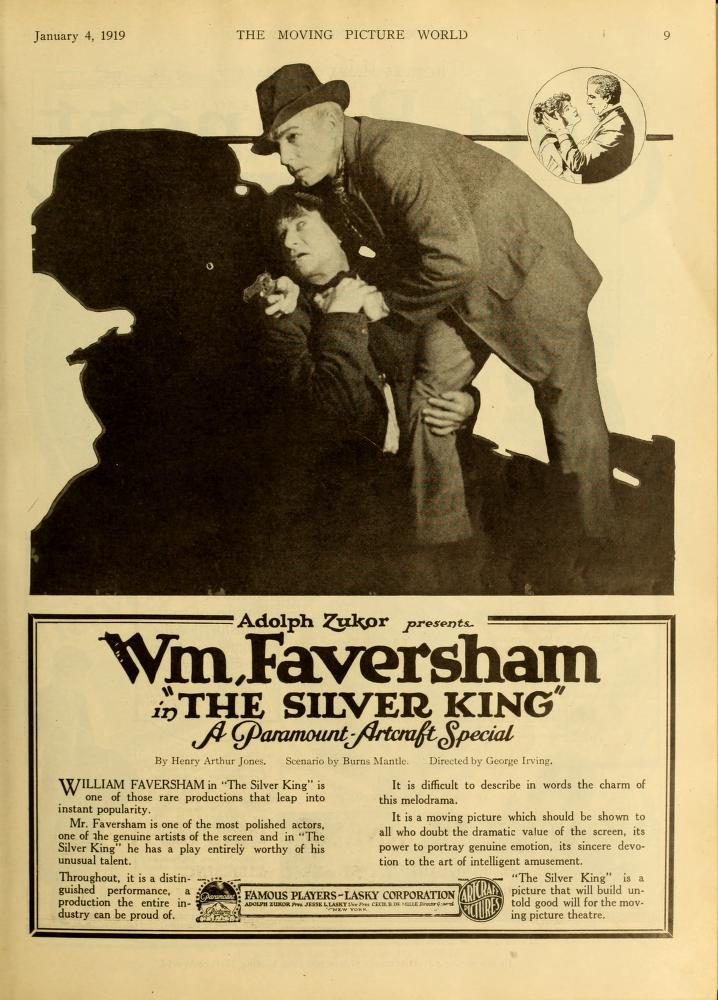
The Silver King (1919)

William Faversham (12 February 1868 – 7 April 1940) was an English stage and film actor, manager, and producer.

== Biography ==
He was born in London. As a teen in the mid-1880s he saw actor Maurice Barrymore on tour and followed the actor through the streets of London during the Barrymore family's stay there from 1884 to 1886. Young Faversham was so impressed by Barrymore and other actors he sought to become one himself. One of the highest paid actors at the turn of the century earning upward of $5,000,000 annually he became one of the last of the legendary actor-managers, William Faversham became a major name on Broadway in the original production of The Importance of Being Earnest in 1895. Faversham was much admired in such potboilers as Brother Officers (1900), which he revived twice that same year and the next, and he produced, directed, and starred in the original production of The Squaw Man (1906). Productions of both Julius Caesar (1914) and Othello (1917) followed. Faversham's Broadway swan song came in a 1931 repertory presentation of Julius Caesar, Hamlet, and The Merchant of Venice.

He became a motion picture star in 1915 courtesy of the burgeoning Metro Pictures. At one point, Faversham's popularity at Metro was second only to that of Francis X. Bushman, the leading matinee idol of the era. Quite elderly by then, Faversham later appeared in bit roles in talkies, including portraying the Duke of Wellington in the Technicolor production of Becky Sharp and, of all things, playing the heroine's father in the low-budget singing cowboy oater The Singing Buckaroo (1937).

Faversham married three times; first to Marian Merwin, then to stage actresses Edith Campbell, and finally to Julie Opp. He and Opp had two children: William Faversham and actor Philip Faversham.

He received a star on the Hollywood Walk of Fame in 1940, the year of his death in Bay Shore, Long Island, New York. He and his wife Julie Opp Faversham are both interred at Huntington Rural Cemetery in Huntington, Long Island, New York.

== Filmography ==
Year	Title	Role	Notes
1914	Our Mutual Girl	Himself	(episode 48)
1915	The Right of Way	Charlie Steele	Lost film
1915	One Million Dollars	Richard Duvall	Lost film
1919	The Silver King	Wilfred Denver	Lost film
1920	The Man Who Lost Himself	Victor Jones / Earl of Rochester	Lost film
1920	The Sin That Was His	Raymond Chapelle	Lost film
1924	The Sixth Commandment	David Brant	Lost film
1934	Lady by Choice	Marlowe - Elocution Teacher	Uncredited
1934	Secret of the Chateau	Monsieur Fos / Professor Racque	
1935	Mystery Woman	Cambon	
1935	Becky Sharp	Duke of Wellington	
1937	The Singing Buckaroo	Dad Evans	
1937	Arizona Days	Professor McGill	(final film role)
