= Daniel Frohman =

American film producer (1851–1940)

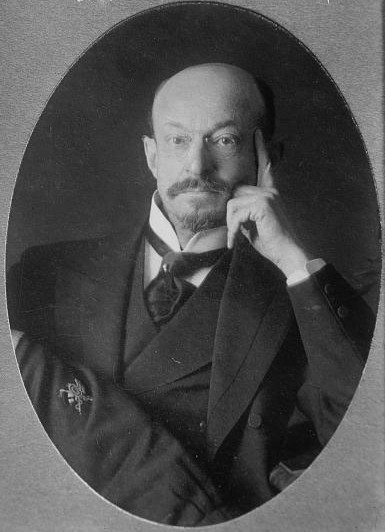
- Frohman in 1907
- Born: August 22, 1851; Sandusky, Ohio, US
- Died: December 26, 1940 (aged 89); New York City, US
- Occupations: American theatrical producer and early film producer
- Spouse: Margaret Illington (m. 1903; div. 1909)
- Relatives: Charles Frohman (brother); Gustave Frohman (brother); Philip H. Frohman (nephew)

Daniel Frohman (August 22, 1851 – December 26, 1940) was an American theatrical producer and manager, and an early film producer.

== Biography ==
Frohman was born to a Jewish family in Sandusky, Ohio. His parents were Henry (1826–1899) and Barbara (Babelle) Straus (1828–1891) Frohman. In his younger days he worked as a clerk at the New-York Tribune, and while there witnessed the fatal shooting of the reporter Albert Deane Richardson by Daniel McFarland on November 25, 1869, and was a witness at McFarland's murder trial.

With his brothers Charles and Gustave Frohman, he helped to develop a system of road companies that would tour the nation while the show also played in New York City. The three brothers worked together at the Madison Square Theatre in the early 1880s. Daniel was the producer-manager of the old and new Lyceum Theatres and the Lyceum stock company from 1886 to 1909. During this period he launched careers for such actors as E. H. Sothern, Henry Miller, William Faversham, Maude Adams, Richard Mansfield and James Keteltas Hackett.

Daniel Frohman was married to Broadway actress Margaret Illington from 1903 to 1909. Illington later married Major Bowes.

Frohman became involved in the motion picture business as a partner and producer with Adolph Zukor in the Famous Players Film Company. He worked from offices on West 26th Street in New York City; between 1913 and 1917 he was part of the production of more than seventy films.

Frohman died at LeRoy Sanitarium in New York on December 26, 1940. He was buried in the Union Field Cemetery in Queens, near his brother Charles, who had died in 1915 in the sinking of the RMS Lusitania.

== Filmography ==
- The Prisoner of Zenda (1915)

== Works ==
- Frohman, Daniel (1935). Daniel Frohman Presents. Claude Kendall and Willoughby Sharp.
- Marcosson, Isaac Frederick; Frohman, Daniel (1916). Charles Frohman: Manager and Man. Harper & Brothers – via gutenberg.org.

== Gallery ==
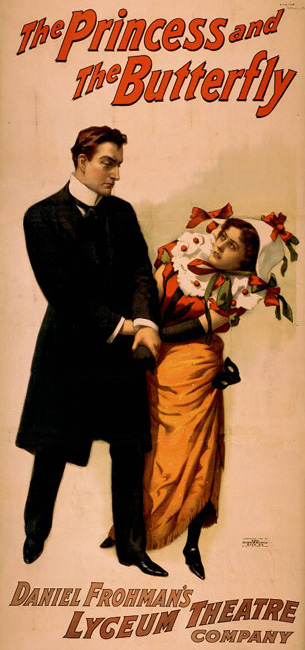
Daniel Frohman Lyceum Theatre Co. Lithograph - 1897, Library of Congress Collection (theatrical poster for The Princess and the Butterfly)

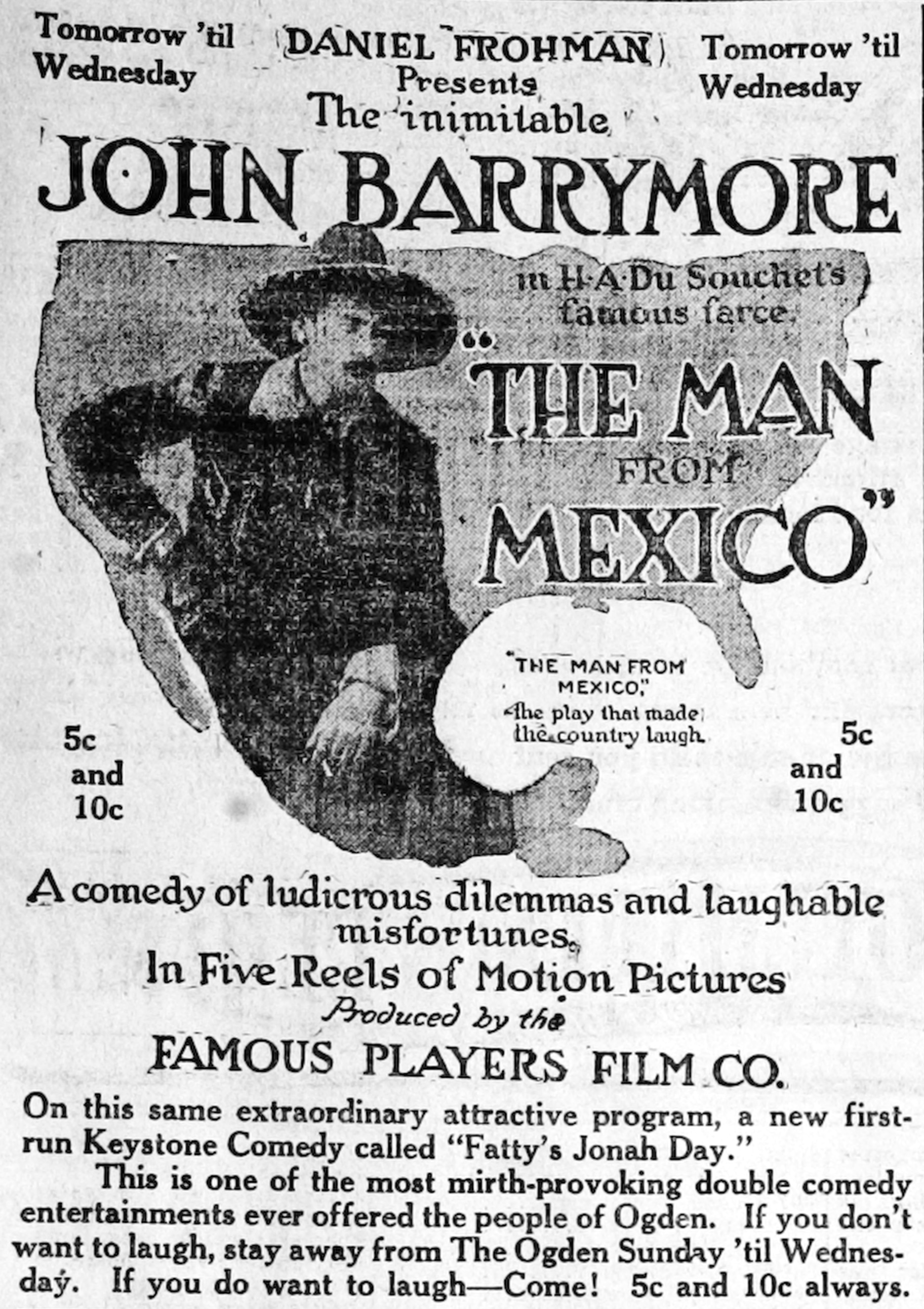
The Man from Mexico, a 1914 silent film produced by the Famous Players Film Company and Daniel Frohman

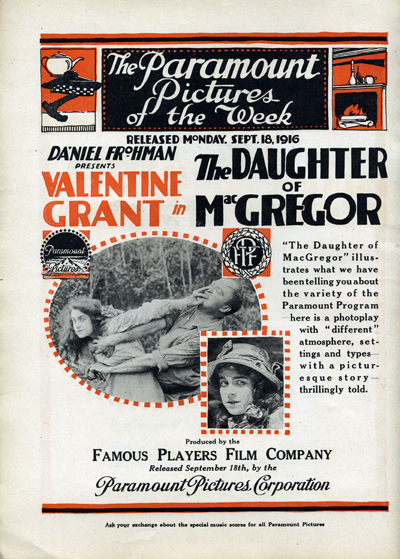
The Daughter of MacGregor, a 1916 silent film produced by Daniel Frohman for the Famous Players Film Company

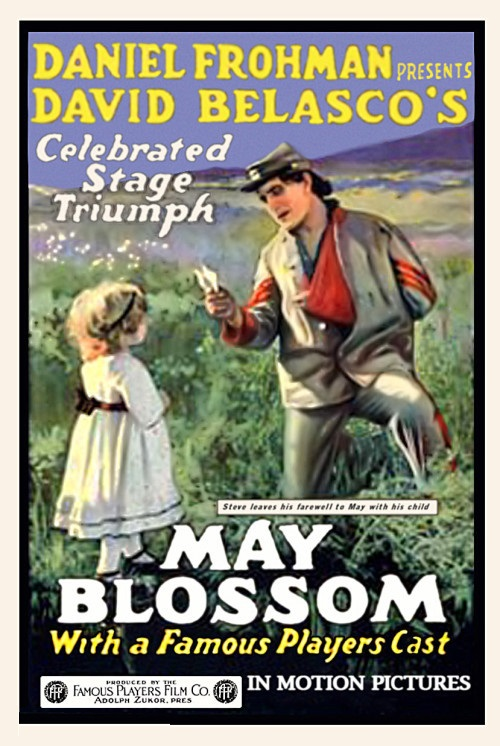
May Blossom, a 1915 feature film effort by Allan Dwan

== Sources ==
- Thomas Allston Brown, A History of the New York Stage From the First Performance in 1732 to 1901, vol. III, (New York: Dodd, Mead & Company, 1903)
- George Cooper, Lost Love: A True Story of Passion, Murder, and Justice in Old New York (New York: Random House/Pantheon, 1994) ISBN 0-679-43398-8
- Stanhope Searles, "Six Books of the Month: Charles Frohman, Manager and Man", The Bookman, vol. 44, no. 3 (November 1916) p. 306
