= Max Freeman =

German actor, theater director and playwright

Max Freeman (c. 1852 – March 27 or March 28, 1912) was a German actor, theater director, theater manager, playwright, and producer who was primarily active in the United States. After beginning his career in his native city of Berlin in 1868, Freeman eventually moved to the United States in 1871 where he began his career in America as the theatre manager for the Germania Theatre in New York City. He had a lengthy stage career as an actor in America from 1873 until his death in 1912. Known as the "godfather of comic opera", he particularly excelled in performances in roles from light operas and musical comedies, and was also responsible for directing and producing works from this genre on Broadway. He also directed and played parts in straight plays as well. His adaptation of Jacques Offenbach's Orfée aux enfers was performed for the grand opening of Broadway's Bijou Theatre in 1883, and his original musical play Claudius Nero, based on Ernest Erkstein's novel Nero, premiered at Niblo's Garden in 1890.

== Life and career ==
Maurice "Max" Freeman was born in Berlin, Germany in c. 1852. He made his professional stage debut in Berlin in 1868 as Francis in Friedrich Schiller's The Robbers. In 1871 he left Germany and came to the United States where he began his life as the theatre manager for the Germania Theatre at 4th Ave and 8th St in New York City. By 1873 he had left New York City for San Francisco, California where he was an actor in the California Theatre Stock Company His first role with that company was as Count Kantschukoff in the first English language staging of Franz von Suppé's comic opera Fatinitza. He then joined the Emelie Melville Opera Company where he had tremendous success in light operas touring the United States.

Freeman's first success on the New York stage was in Henry E. Abbey's 1882 production of Victorien Sardou's Divorçons at the Abbey's Park Theatre where he achieved great comic effect as the waiter in Act 3 of the play. Other roles on Broadway soon followed, including Bertrand in Bartley Campbell's Siberia (1883), Koulikoff Demetrovitch in A Russian Honeymoon (1883, an adaptation of a play by Eugène Scribe by Mrs. Burton Harris), Cragin in William Young's The Rajah (1883), and Count de Brionne in Anselma (1885). The latter play was an English-language adaptation of Sardou's 1873 French-language play Andréa which was created by Leander Richardson for the Austrian actress Antonie Janisch (1848–1920), known on the stage as Madame Janisch. During its Broadway run, the play was at the center of several court battles over the performance rights to Sardou's work, and was ultimately barred from any further performances by the New York Supreme Court in December 1885.

Freeman adapted Jacques Offenbach's Orfée aux enfers into the English language 'Orpheus and Eurydice which was performed for the grand opening of Broadway's Bijou Theatre on December 1, 1883. Freeman also performed the role of Pluto in the production. In 1886 he portrayed Chevalier de Brabazon in the United States premiere of Edward Jakobowski's Erminie. In 1890 Freeman's original play Claudius Nero, a stage work Freeman adapted from Ernest Erkstein's novel Nero, premiered at Niblo's Garden on 22 October. The work was essentially an early musical, including songs and ballet.

Freeman directed his first stage work on Broadway in 1896, the comic opera Santa Maria by composer and librettist Oscar Hammerstein I. Other works he directed on Broadway included the musical Miss Manhattan (1897, libretto by George V. Hobart); Reginald De Koven's operetta The Highwayman (1897); the Edgar Smith and Louis De Lange musical's The Little Host (1898) and Mother Goose (1898); and the 1899 revival of Erminie in which Freeman also returned to the stage as Brabazon. He directed and starred in a few more plays on Broadway, including Ludwig Englander's The Rounders (1899, as Joseph), Hubert Henry Davies's Cynthia (1903), Gustav Kerker and Harry B. Smith's The Blonde in Black (1903, M. Carrousel Ladjos), and Henri Dumay's Mademoiselle Marni (1905); the latter being his last Broadway credit as a director. His other directing credits on Broadway included Broadway to Tokio (1900), Stanislaus Stange's Quo Vadis (1900), Sweet Anne Page (1900), Theodore Burt Sayre's Manon Lescaut (1901), A Modern Magdalen (1902), Gretna Green (1903), Love's Lottery (1904), and a A China Doll (1904).

Freeman continued to perform on Broadway into the end of career, with his last performance on the New York Stage being the role of Professor Diggs in Philip Bartholomae's Over Night in 1911. His other late career performances on Broadway included roles in Heidelberg (1902), Divorçons (1907), The Girl from Rector's (1909), and The Girl in the Taxi (1910). His final stage performance was in Cleveland in 1912 in A. H. Woods's Modest Suzanne. In addition to his many accomplishments as an actor, director, and producer on Broadway, Freeman also had lengthy tenures at the stage manager for first the Madison Square Theatre and later the Casino Theatre.

== Death ==
Freeman committed suicide and his body was discovered March 28, 1912 at the Hotel Grenoble in New York City. Having hung himself, it was determined that he died either sometime in the morning on March 28 or possibly late in the evening on March 27, 1912.

== Bibliography ==
- William Davenport Adams (1904). "Anselma". A Dictionary of the Drama: A Guide to the Plays, Playwrights, Players, and Playhouses of the United Kingdom and America, from the Earliest Times to the Present. A-G. B. Franklin.
- Gerald Martin Bordman, Richard Norton (2010). American Musical Theatre: A Chronicle. Oxford University Press. ISBN 9780199729708.
- T. Allston Brown (1903). A history of the New York stage from the first performance in 1732 to 1901, volume 2. Dodd, Mead & Co.
- John Franceschina (2018). Incidental and Dance Music in the American Theatre from 1786 to 1923 Volume 1. BearManor Media.
- James Fisher and Felicia Hardison Londré (2017). "Freeman, Max". Historical Dictionary of American Theater: Modernism. Rowman & Littlefield Publishers. ISBN 9781538107867.
- Kurt Gänzl (2001). The Encyclopedia of the Musical Theatre: O-Z. Schirmer Books. ISBN 9780028655741.
