= S. Henry Pincus =

S. Henry Pincus (died February 25, 1915, Houston) was an American theatre impresario, theatre manager, stage actor, and inventor.

== Life and career ==
Born into a Jewish family in Philadelphia, Pincus toured the United States as a member of Edward Askew Sothern's theatre troupe. He also appeared on Broadway, making his debut as Henry Clay Rustler in Leander Richardson's Anselma at the Madison Square Theatre in 1885. As an impresario he established several theaters. In Philadelphia he commissioned the building of the Winter Circus at the corner of Broad and Cherry Streets. In conjunction with William J. Thompson he established two theaters in Wilmington, Delaware. He also managed several theatres in Philadelphia during his lifetime.

In addition to his work in the theatre, Pincus was an inventor. His most notable invention was a pumping mechanism for gas which he patented on March 23, 1880. An 1898 report from the American Gas Light Association reported that 236, 622 homes were using this device.

== Death and interment ==
Pincus died in Houston, Texas on February 25, 1915. His body was returned to Philadelphia and was subsequently interred at a cemetery there.
