= Jane Frances Winn =

American journalist (1855–1927)

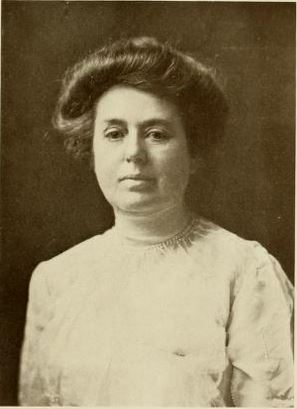
- Winn in 1914
- Born: 1855; Chillicothe, Ohio, US
- Died: 1927 (aged 71–72)
- Other name: Frank Fair
- Occupation: Journalist

Jane Frances Winn (1855 – 1927), who wrote as Frank Fair, was an American journalist. She was called the "dean of newspaper women" in St. Louis. By 1903, she was recognized as a journalist to whom "even men" paid their homage: The Journalist, a New York City weekly periodical about newspaper people and their work, profiled Winn in its series of prominent writers.

== Early life ==
Winn was born in 1855 in Chillicothe, Ohio, the daughter of Thomas Winn (1825–1880) and Anna M. Winn (1835–1901). She was of Irish parentage on her father's side, and on her mother's she was of English extraction.

When she was twelve years old, Winn became the editor of her grammar-school paper, the "Excelsior". She wrote the editorials, padded the "want columns" and wrote a poem each week.

== Career ==
Like many women journalists at the time, Winn started her career as a teacher, teaching both botany and chemistry in her native town of Ohio. While she was teaching in high school, her sister Eleanor was teaching in the elementary school.

To keep up with the work of her classes, for five years Winn took courses at Harvard University during the summer, and spent one summer at the Starling Medical College in Columbus, Ohio, studying chemistry privately under Curtis B. Howard, who was a well-known toxicologist.

When the board of education would not supply a laboratory for qualitative analysis to the chemistry class Winn was teaching, Winn and her students created one of their own. They constructed test tube holders from jack-knives, and out of ink bottles constructed the alcohol lamps. One of her students, Frederick L. Dunlap, later became an instructor of chemistry at the University of Michigan and worked with chemical companies in the Chicago area.

Winn made a study of the oaks of Ohio and wrote a monograph on the subject, and she was elected vice-president of the Ohio Academy of Science for 1895.

Her desire to write, and a series of articles on botany, illustrated by one of the boy pupils in her class, was her introduction to newspaper work in the city of St. Louis. The young man, William Ireland, became the cartoonist of The Columbus Dispatch, and was known by the shamrock attached to his signature.

Winn was one of the founders of the Century Club of her native town — Chillicothe, Ohio — one of the others who was a charter member being Mrs. Wilson Woodrow, well known in literature. The club, of which she was the secretary for three years, sent Winn as a delegate to the general federation convention in Denver in 1898, and stopping off in St. Louis to meet the editor of the paper to whom she had been sending her botany stories, she was engaged to take charge of the club column.

Winn was the representative of her newspaper on the Board of Lady Managers for the Louisiana Purchase Exposition in 1904, and counted as one of her privileges to have met Cardinal Francesco Satolli, among others. Introduced to him by Archbishop John J. Glennon as a newspaper writer, he impulsively picked up a menu at a dinner in his honor at the German House, and wrote down "Honestas, Veritas, Caritas", saying, "Let this be your motto: 'Be honest always in what you write, tell only the truth, and love your profession so dearly that you will never fall short of your ideal of perfect fairness.' "

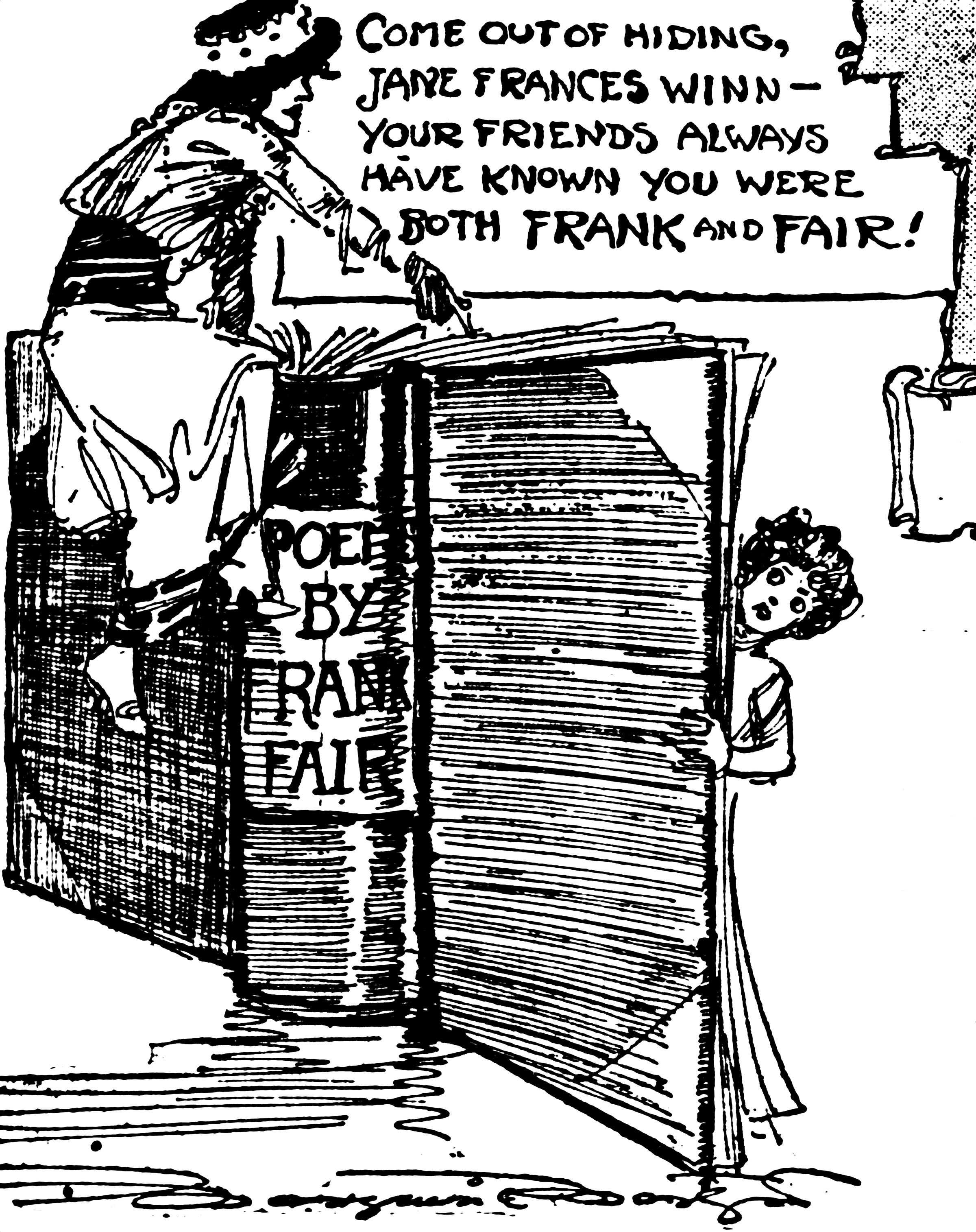
Imaginative sketch by journalist Marguerite Martyn, showing herself atop a volume of Poetry by Frank Fair, with Winn hiding behind an open cover, 1914

Winn's work was club news, "Matters of Interest for Women Readers", on the daily, and a half page, each week, under the name of "Frank Fair", under caption "Women the Wide World Over", including two poems for the Sunday "Globe-Democrat".

The column "Matters of Interest to Women Readers", was finished off with a paragraph, "By Way of Comment", often a poem. For many years, friends asked Winn to collect them in a book but she never agreed.

On Sundays "Women the Wide World Over" took up a half page, and was a condensed account of what women were accomplishing, in what work they were progressing in the United States and abroad.

Winn was on the staff of the St. Louis Globe-Democrat, first as women's editor, than women's sports editor and last as literary editor and head of the department of book review, while continuing to write the Frank Fair column. When she died in 1927, she was still employed at the newspaper.

She was a pioneer golf writer, editor for the women's sports because she was one of the few newspaper women in the 1900s to be familiar with the game. She covered the principal women's golf events: The Shinnecock Hills Golf Club on Long Island admitted women in 1891, the first ladies golf tournament in the United States was held in 1894 and the Amateur Golf Association of the United States, soon to be renamed the United States Golf Association, was formed in 1894. As early as 1903, she was recognized as a journalist to whom even men paid their homage: The Journalist, a New York City weekly periodical devoted to the interests of newspaper people and their work, profiled Winn in its series of prominent writers: "Among the feminist contingent of the Globe-Democrat's staff, a lady whose work is attracting particular attention, is Miss Jane Frances Winn, who writes of women's clubs, golf, whist, botany and kindred subjects. Under the pen name of "Frank Fair" her brilliant articles are widely read, as well as are her clever contributions each week in the magazine section."

She was a member of the English-Speaking Union, the National Arts Club, the National Science Club and the Contemporary Club.

In 1905, she wrote "Elsinore, or the Land of the Silver Lining", which was represented by child actors at the Century Theater in St. Louis under the direction of Jacob Mahler. The performance was for the benefit of the Memorial Home, Grand and Magnolia Avenue. In 1909 Winn wrote "Papilla or the Culprit Fairy", which was represented at the Odeo on May under the direction of Jacob Mahler. The proceeds were to go to the Baptist Orphans' Home.

In 1915, Winn, together with Anna G. Marten, addressed the Missouri Women's Press Association during Journalism Week in Columbia, Missouri. Winn's panel was "The New Journalism in Its Relation to Women". In 1920, she addressed the Missouri Press Association in Rolla, Missouri, with the talk "Journalism for Women". In 1922, during the 25th annual dinner and business meeting of the Ohio Society of St. Louis, Winn was elected as a director. In 1926, she spoke in front of the Society of St. Louis Authors on "The Woman on the Job".

In 1921, Winn, speaking on free verse as a "protest against old-fashioned rhymes", called Walt Whitman the "father of the new movement" and Sara Teasdale the "Shelley of America".

== Personal life ==
Jane Frances Winn lived with her brother, Frank T. Winn (1865–1918), who was also engaged in newspaper work, near Forest Park University.

She never married, and spent the later part of her life writing.

She died in 1927, aged 71 or 72, and is buried with her family at Grandview Cemetery, Chillicothe, Ohio.
