= Carrie Turner (actress) =

American actress

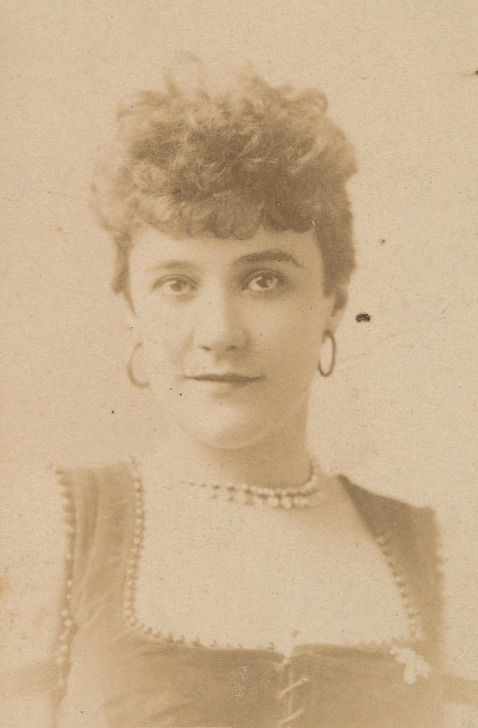
Carrie Turner

Carrie Turner (1863 – October 12, 1897) was an American actress known for her stage performances in the 1880s and 1890s.

Turner was born in Albany, New York, where she graduated from Albany High School. She first came to the public's popular attention as a member of Daniel Frohman's company at the Madison Square Theatre on Broadway. While appearing in the successful Young Miss Winthrop it was revealed that she had married Albert J. His, a Swiss citizen. She retired from the stage for a time to move to Switzerland. After they divorced, His took their child back from the United States to Switzerland without approval, which caused a number of headlines.

Turner married John Mack in 1894, to whom he was married at the time of her death at the Dansville sanitarium on October 12, 1897. She is buried at the Albany Rural Cemetery, where her gravestone reads "She was a player, that taking her all in all we shall not look upon her like again."

== Selected appearances ==
- Edmund Kean (1882) as Anna Danby at the Academy of Music (New York debut)
- Young Miss Winthrop (1882) as Constance Winthrop
- Paul Kauver (1888) as Diane at the Standard Theatre
- Niobe (1891) as Niobe at the Bijou Theatre
