= Antonie Janisch =

Austrian actress (1848–1920)

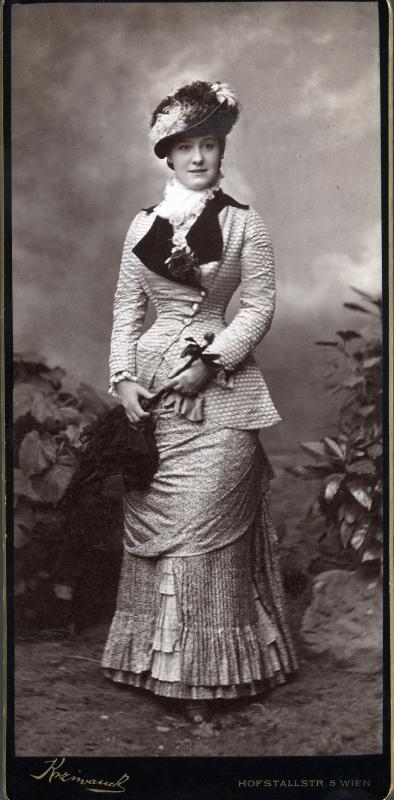
- Born: May 9, 1848; Vienna, Austria
- Died: October 12, 1920 (aged 72)
- Other names: Madame Janisch
- Occupation: Actress

Antonie Janisch, also known on the stage as Madame Janisch (May 9, 1848, Vienna – October 12, 1920, Vienna) was an Austrian actress.

== Career ==
Antonie Janisch began her career as a teenager at the Theater an der Wien where her first significant role was as the fairy Topase in Die Hirschkuh in 1863. After an unsuccessful appearance at the Burgtheater, she pursued acting training in Berlin in 1868. When she joined the company of players at the Thalia Theater in Hamburg in 1869 she had a critical triumph, and was thereafter a well regarded stage actress in Austria. She returned to the Burgtheater in 1872–1873, and then briefly retired from performance after marrying Count Ludwig Arco Valley.

In 1875, Antonie resumed her career at the Burgtheater where she was one of the lead actresses of the company through 1882. She then spent the next decade performing in England and the United States as well as other theaters in Germany. She made her Broadway debut in 1885 at the Madison Square Theatre in the title role of Anselma; an English-language work created by Leander Richardson after Victorien Sardou 1873 French-language play Andréa. She performed at the Burgtheatre once again in 1892–1893, and then retired from performance.
