= Young Mrs. Winthrop =

1919 film by Walter Edwards

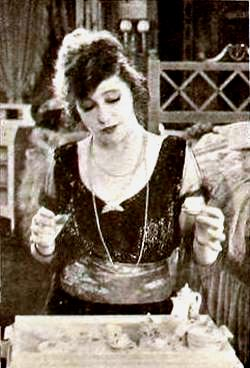
- Film still
- Directed by: Walter Edwards
- Written by: Edith Kennedy
- Based on: Young Mrs. Winthrop by Bronson Howard
- Produced by: Adolph Zukor; Jesse L. Lasky
- Starring: Ethel Clayton
- Cinematography: Henry Kotani
- Distributed by: Paramount Pictures
- Release date: February 29, 1920
- Running time: 50 minutes; 5 reels
- Country: United States
- Language: Silent (English intertitles)

Young Mrs. Winthrop is a lost 1920 American silent drama film starring Ethel Clayton. It is based on the 1882 Victorian era Broadway play by Bronson Howard. The film was produced by Famous Players–Lasky and distributed by Paramount Pictures.

== Plot ==
As described in a film magazine, Constance Winthrop and her husband Douglas have drifted apart through her devotion to social events and his work. The birthday of their five-year-old child draws them together and they plan to drop their outside engagements and devote the day to little Rosie. However, Mrs. Dunbar, an eavesdropping neighbor, after overhearing a message on a party line, has her maid impersonate Mrs. Winthrop and telephone Mr. Winthrop to not come home as she has changed her mind about the party and is going out. Douglas, deeply hurt, stops by Mrs. Dunbar's house on business and is seen by his wife. Thinking that she has been deceived, Constance rushes off to a Jazz party. That evening the child Rosie contracts membranous croup and dies. When Constance arrives home late that night, Douglas refuses to let her into the room, and she says "I am a thousand times more fit to be with her than you." The two drift further apart and, upon the verge of a formal separation, the old family lawyer skillfully plays upon their feelings that a reunification results.

== Cast ==
- Ethel Clayton as Constance Winthrop
- Harrison Ford as Douglas Winthrop
- Helen Dunbar as Old Mrs. Winthrop
- Joan Marsh as Rosie (credited as Dorothy Rosher)
- Winifred Greenwood as Mrs. Dick Chetwyn
- J. M. Dumont as Dick Rodney
- Charles Ogle as Buxton Scott
- Raymond Hatton as Nick Jones
- Mabel Van Buren as Mrs. Dunbar
- Viora Daniel as Janet
- Walter Hiers as Dick Chetwyn
- Rex Zane as Bob
