= Anselma (play) =

Play in six acts

- Original language: English
- Written by: Leander Richardson
- Based on: Andréa by Victorien Sardou

Premiere
- Date: September 7, 1885
- Place: Madison Square Theatre, New York City

Anselma, also known as The Princess Andrea, is a play in six acts. It is an 1885 English-language adaptation of Victorien Sardou's 1873 French-language play Andréa which was created by Leander Richardson for the Austrian actress Antonie Janisch (1848–1920), known on the stage as Madame Janisch. The play became a source of contention in the Judiciary of New York with several legal battles between the producers of Anselma and the actress Agnes Ethel arguing over the rights to Sardou's play.

== History ==
Anselma premiered on Broadway at the Madison Square Theatre on September 7, 1885. Originally the play was supposed to premiere a week earlier but prior to its premiere, the production was embroiled in legal battles after the actress Agnes Ethel successfully obtained an injunction against the planned premiere performance of the play on August 31, 1885. Ethel had previously obtained the rights for an earlier English-language stage adaptation of the play which had been titled Agnes. In her lawsuit, Ethel claimed that she owned the sole rights to any production of Andréa. To further complicate matters, Ethel had sold the rights of performance for Agnes to the actress Kate Claxton.

The court case surrounding Anselma was widely covered in the American press, and it was an important early copyright law case. Initially a New York City judge ruled that Sardou maintained his copyright to the work and that as the work had been published and was available for public consumption, Ethel could not claim a right to sole performance. Further, the producer's of Anselma had entered into an agreement with the actress Kate Claxton, who had purchased the rights of performance from Ethel, to pay her royalties and thus a legal work-around was reached for performances of the play to continue in the midst of court battles. Ultimately, the lower court's initial ruling was overturned by the New York Supreme Court in December 1885, and Agnes Ethel was recognized as legally owning the rights to Sardou'sAndréa in both Australia and the United States as the actress had purchased those rights from the author. This ruling placed a permanent injunction on performances of Anselma and any other stage adaptation of Sardou's play in the United States without the permission of Agnes Ethel. After this ruling performances of Anselma ceased.

== Broadway cast ==
- Antonie Janisch as Anselma
- Henry Miller as Count Marcelin de Pourtales
- Gabrielle Du Sauld as Stella
- Leslie Edmunds as Dr. Bazilos
- S. Henry Pincus as Henry Clay Rustler
- Nettie Abbott as Mme. Celine
- W. J. Ferguson as Basil
- Max Freeman as Count de Brionne
- M. B. Hoffman as Lambert
- Jenny Karsner as Sidonie
- G. H. Leonard as General Boulevardo
- John G McDonald as Oroide Brassey
- H. S. Millward as Grabbitt
- M. Morton as Kraft
