= Wealth (film) =

1921 film

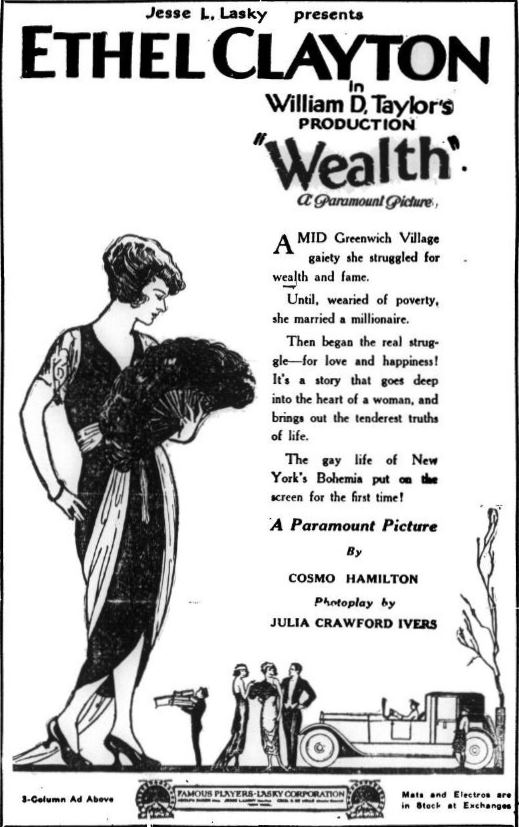
- Advertisement
- Directed by: William Desmond Taylor
- Screenplay by: Cosmo Hamilton; Julia Crawford Ivers
- Produced by: Jesse L. Lasky
- Starring: Ethel Clayton; Herbert Rawlinson; J.M. Dumont; Larry Steers; George Periolat; Claire McDowell
- Cinematography: James Van Trees
- Production company: Famous Players–Lasky Corporation
- Distributed by: Paramount Pictures
- Release date: August 21, 1921
- Running time: 50 minutes
- Country: United States
- Language: Silent (English intertitles)

Wealth is a 1921 American silent drama film directed by William Desmond Taylor, written by Cosmo Hamilton and Julia Crawford Ivers, and starring Ethel Clayton, Herbert Rawlinson, J.M. Dumont, Larry Steers, George Periolat, and Claire McDowell. It was released on August 21, 1921, by Paramount Pictures. It is not known whether the film currently survives, and it may be a lost film.

== Plot ==
As described in a film magazine, artist Mary McLeod meets Phillip Dominick, the son of a wealthy woman, on a Pullman car on a train bound for the city. When she informs the conductor that she has left her purse behind, Phillip magnanimously offers his stateroom to her. The chance acquaintance ripens to love, and they get married. The match does not meet the approval of Phillip's mother, and when they move in with her, she makes life almost unbearable for Mary. The wife also becomes disgusted with the idle life her husband leads. Then a baby is born to them. Phillip goes on a camping trip, and while he is absent, the child dies. Upon his return, Mary decides to leave him. Phillip follows her to her studio and announces that his mother's money has been a curse. He swears that he will be a man from then on, and Mary knows happiness lies ahead for them.

== Cast ==
- Ethel Clayton as Mary McLeod
- Herbert Rawlinson as Phillip Dominick
- J.M. Dumont as Gordon Townsend
- Larry Steers as Oliver Marshall
- George Periolat as Irving Seaton
- Claire McDowell as Mrs. Dominick
- Jean Acker as Estelle Rolland
- Richard Wayne as Dr. Howard
