= The Miracle Man (1919 film) =

1919 film by George Loane Tucker

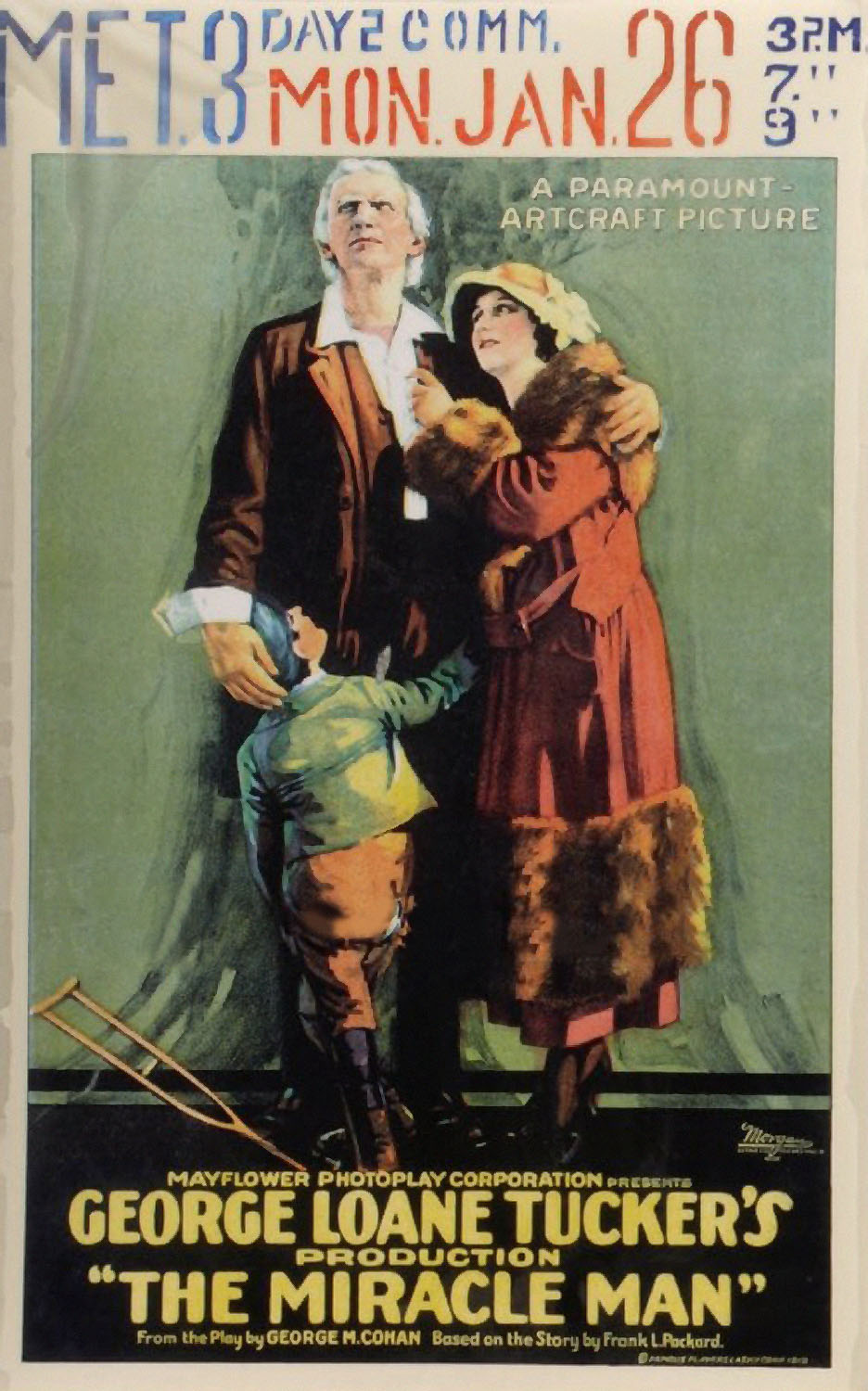
- Film poster
- Directed by: George Loane Tucker
- Written by: George Loane Tucker (scenario)
- Based on: The Miracle Man (play) by George M. Cohan
- Produced by: George Loane Tucker
- Starring: Thomas Meighan; Betty Compson; Lon Chaney; Joseph J. Dowling; J.M. Dumont; Lawson Butt (*uncredited)
- Cinematography: Philip E. Rosen; Ernest G. Palmer
- Music by: Jacques Grandfi; Harry B. Smith (lyrics)
- Production companies: Mayflower Photoplay Company; Paramount Pictures
- Distributed by: Famous Players–Lasky
- Release date: August 29, 1919
- Running time: 80 minutes (8 reels)
- Country: United States
- Languages: Silent; English intertitles
- Budget: $120,000
- Box office: $1 million (rentals) or $2 million

The Miracle Man is a 1919 American silent drama film starring Lon Chaney and based on a 1914 play by George M. Cohan, which in turn is based on the novel of the same title by Frank L. Packard. The film was released by Paramount Pictures, directed, produced, and written by George Loane Tucker, and also stars Thomas Meighan and Betty Compson. The film made overnight successes of the three stars, most notably putting Chaney on the map as a character actor.

Paramount remade the film in 1932 also titled The Miracle Man with Hobart Bosworth, Chester Morris, John Wray, and Sylvia Sidney. Today, the majority of the 1919 film is considered lost, with only two fragments, totaling about three minutes, surviving.

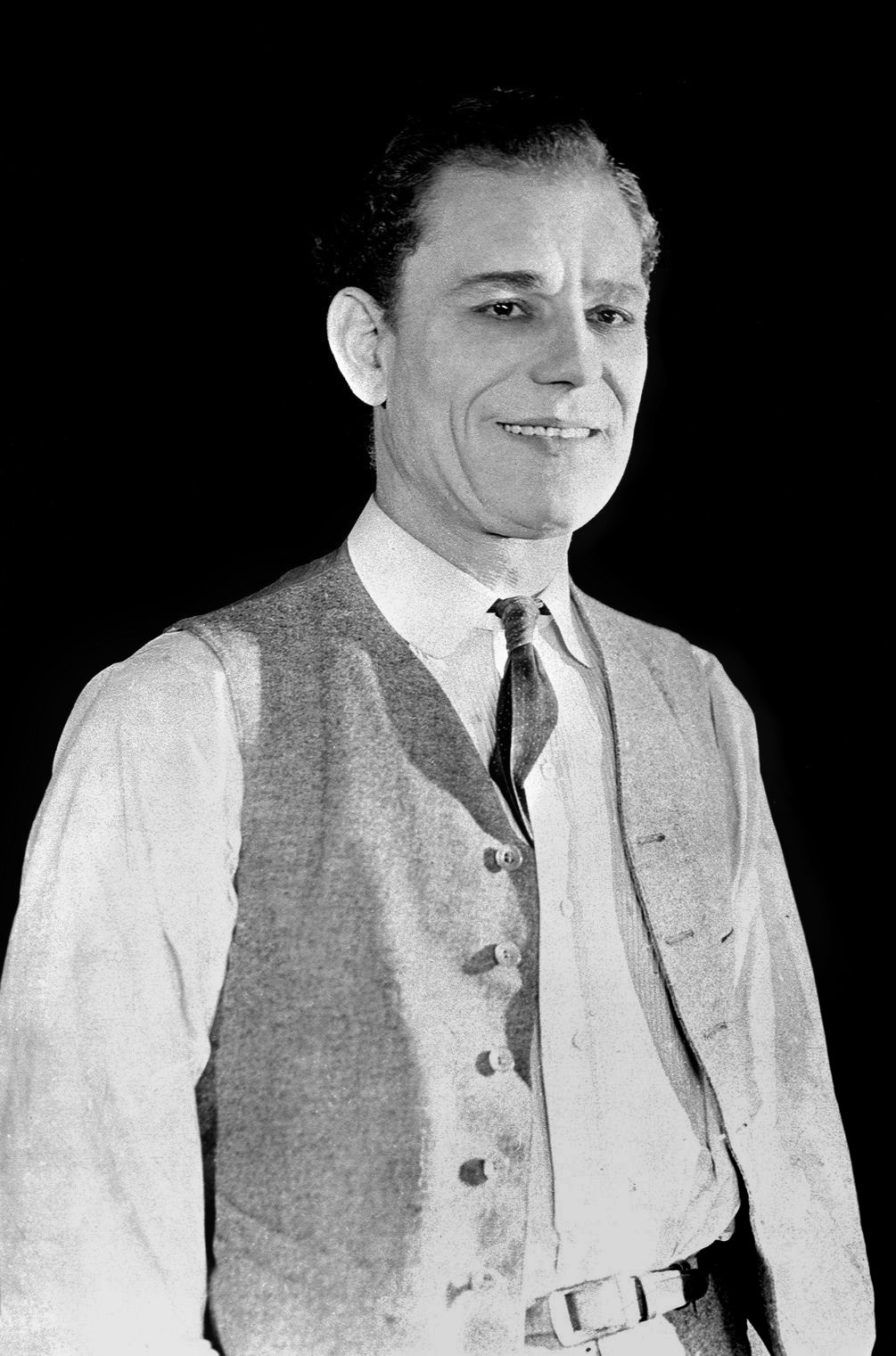
Lon Chaney during the production of The Miracle Man.

== Plot ==
The film takes place in a small, New England town in 1919 (the Broadway play 1914), where a group of con men plan to use a faith healer to collect money.

In New York City's Chinatown, four crooks conspire to swindle a small New England town. The gang consists of Tom Burke, the head of the group; Rose, a con artist posing as a street walker; "The Dope", who pretends to pimp Rose; and The Frog, a contortionist.

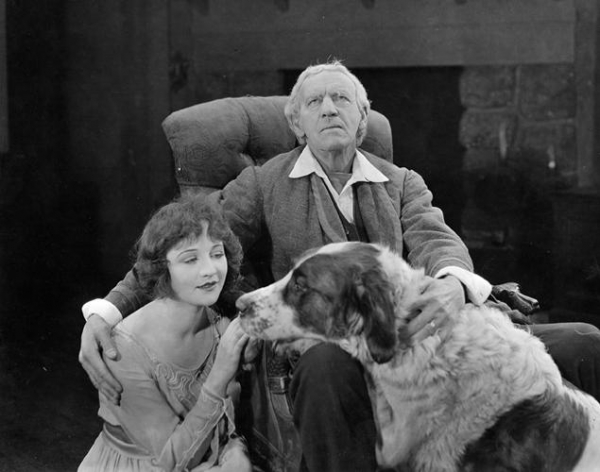
Betty Compson and Joseph J. Dowling in a scene with St. Bernard co-star.

The plan is clear: in a small town outside of Boston there is a Patriarch who has been healing people. The group heads to the town and plans to use the Patriarch in a faith healing scheme. When the townspeople gather to see the Patriarch heal the sick, the Frog is there, posing as a cripple. As he crawls to the path of the man, his limbs become straightened and soon he walks to the Patriarch, supposedly healed. Unexpectedly, a crippled boy, his faith in the Patriarch overpowering him, loses his crutches and runs to the Patriarch.

The story spreads across the country (mostly on account of Burke), and people flock in from all over to visit the Patriarch and be healed. When a millionaire, Richard King, brings his sister to be healed, he gives Burke $50,000 after the Patriarch cures her. During this visit, King meets Rose, and the two fall in love.

Meanwhile, all is not well with Burke. One by one, he sees his gang disbanding because, unbeknownst to him, the healing power of the Patriarch is at work. The Dope gives up his drug addiction, The Frog gives up his life of crime and takes care of a widow left all alone, and Rose laments King's departure.

Burke becomes jealous, but when King returns to propose marriage to Rose, she realizes that she loves Burke. The Patriarch dies, and the two lovers begin anew.

== Cast ==
- Lon Chaney – The Frog
- Betty Compson – Rose
- Joseph J. Dowling – The Patriarch
- J. M. Dumont – The Dope
- Elinor Fair – Claire King
- Thomas Meighan – Tom Burke
- F. A. Turner – Mr. Higgins
- Lucille Hutton – Ruth Higgins
- Lawson Butt – Richard King
- Kisaburo Kurihara – The Jap

Uncredited

- Tula Belle
- T. D. Crittenden
- Ruby Lafayette
- Frankie Lee

== Background and production ==
Initially intended as a vehicle for Meighan after he saw the Cohan play, Cohan sold the rights to the story to Paramount for $25,000. Packard sold the rights to his original novel for $17,500. George Loane Tucker had previously been hailed as one of the "first of the immortals" of film directors after his 1913 success, Traffic in Souls. Alfred A. Grasso, an assistant director on the film, would later go on to serve as Lon Chaney's business manager and personal friend.

Lon Chaney was chosen by director George Loane Tucker, and this was his eighth film as a freelance artist after leaving Universal Studios in 1918. His work in the William S. Hart picture, Riddle Gawne established him as a character actor of some notoriety, but it was The Miracle Man that would put both his acting and makeup skills (for which he was famous) to the test. Chaney auditioned for the part of The Frog in Tucker's office, grotesquely contorting his body. Tucker was reportedly "shaken" by the intensity of Chaney's performance.

This film version is more based on the novel than the stage play. However, neither the movie nor the stage play used the character names from the novel.

Character name in movie	Character name in novel
The Frog	The Flopper (uses alias Michael Coogan)
Rose	Helena Smith (uses alias Helena Vail)
The Dope	Pale Face Harry
Tom Burke	John Garfield "Doc" Madison
Richard King	Robert Thornton

== Reception ==
The Miracle Man was well received by both critics and audiences. Initially produced for $126,000, the film grossed $1,000,000 in theatrical rentals and became the second highest-grossing film of 1919. During the film's run at the Orchestra Hall in Chicago, (where it broke all house records), airplanes dropped free tickets and brass coins which read "The Miracle Man is here" printed on one side and "Have faith, keep this" on the other.

Because of the film's success, it launched its leads, Compson, Meighan and Chaney, into stardom. Meighan later went on to major leading roles while Chaney became one of the highest paid character actors in Hollywood until his death in 1930. Compson's name rose above the titles of most of the movies she made for the rest of the silent era. George Loane Tucker received critical success from the film and planned more, but only completed one more film before his death in 1921.

In 1920, Photoplay magazine held a "Letter Contest" polling their readers regarding their twelve favorite films. The Miracle Man ranked at #1, beating out Broken Blossoms, The Birth of a Nation, and Cabiria.

== Contemporary reviews ==
Variety stated that "Since Ben Hur nothing approaching this has been seen on stage or screen, and it has Ben Hur beaten seven ways for real sentiment. It is simpler, more true to life as we know it, and so more effective"

Moving Picture World claimed that "Pictorially, the drama is a succession of compositions that have true artistic form. The conception and handling of the scenes in which The Frog is the central figure...are daring and masterly.

Photoplay highlighted the performance of Lon Chaney, who they said was "so good as the Frog that I cannot think of anyone who could have played that grotesque monster as effectively."

Motion Picture News' reviewer effusively praised the film, going so far to say that "It has been shown that thru the magic of the motion picture the people can be dazzled by pagentry, thrilled by magnificent spectacle and the simulation of dramatic perils. But they become sated with these mechanical ingenuities and extravagances. It is when the secret places of the heart are opened to them that the response is greatest, as to this revelation of the silent power of faith and purity, in a story unfolding in the beauty and fragrance of a flower.

The New York Times praised the acting, noting that "unusually good work is done by Thomas Meighan, Betty Compson and Lon Chaney in a picture which will please all movie enthusiasts and convert a few more."

Wid's Film Daily review asserted that "The Miracle Man is the most exceptionally entertaining and trememdously appealing dramatic production I have ever seen....Lon Chaney, in an exceptional characterization, will be remembered forever by everyone who sees this film."

== Preservation ==
Fragment of The Miracle Man

The majority of The Miracle Man is now lost. However, two fragments of the film survive: the first is a segment of one of Paramount's Movie Milestone series, Movie Memories (1935), showcasing the studios' greatest achievements. This clip shows both a segment from the conclave in Chinatown as well as the healing scene, which was praised by critics as one of the most powerful scenes yet put on film. A nitrate print of Movie Memories is at the UCLA Film & Television Archive.

The second clip that survives is part of a short promotional film called The House That Shadows Built (1931) made for Paramount's 20th anniversary of its founding in 1912. This footage was used when a full print of the film still existed. All told, a total of only about 3 minutes of the film exists at this point.

== Home media ==
The documentary Movie Milestones with the surviving fragments was released from Blackhawk Films in 8mm format in the 1970s. These fragments were featured in the 1995 documentary Lon Chaney: Behind the Mask, produced by Kino International and included on the 2012 DVD release version of The Penalty (1920).
