= The City of Masks =

1920 film by Thomas N. Heffron

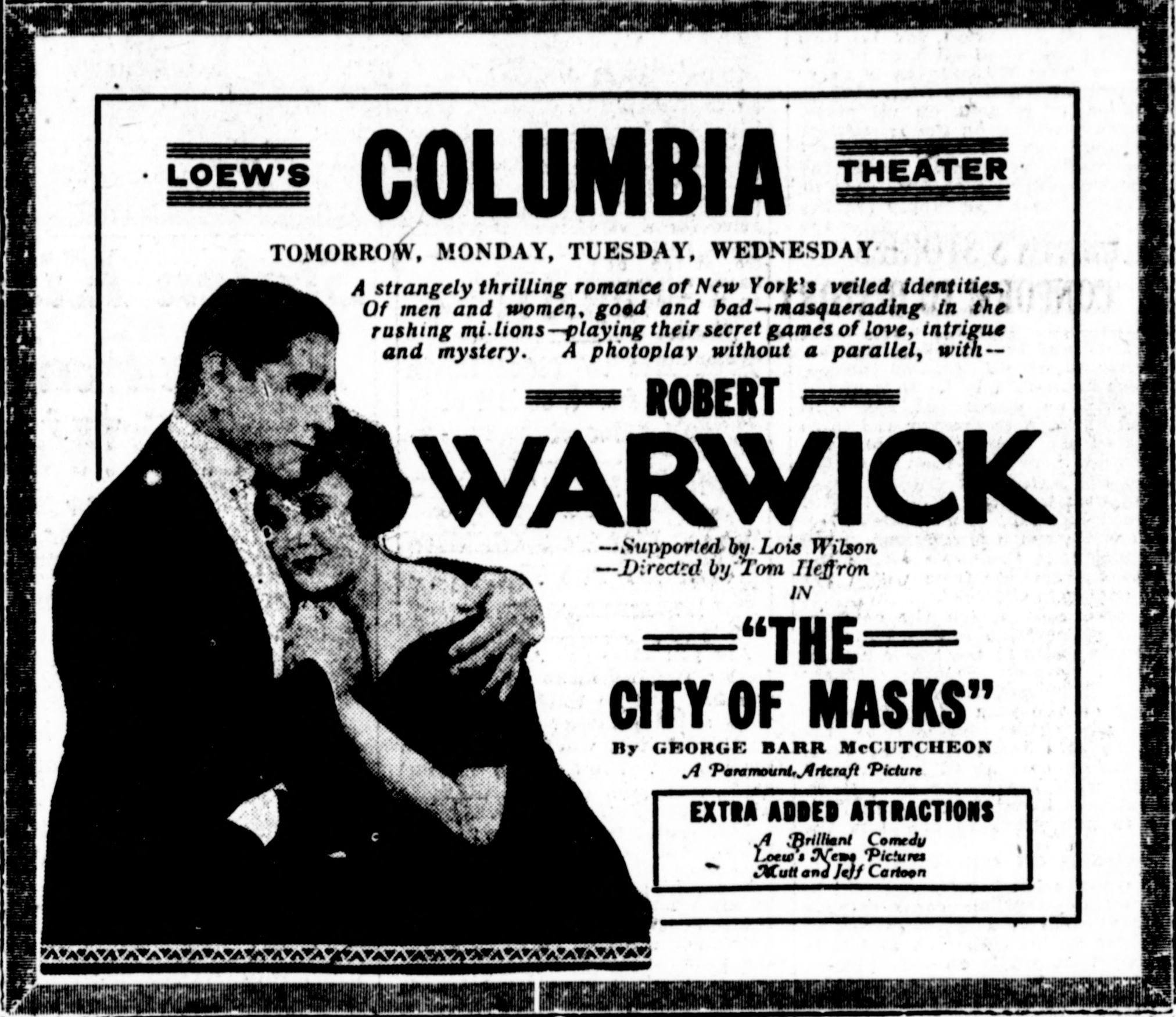
- A newspaper advertisement.
- Directed by: Thomas N. Heffron
- Written by: Walter Woods (scenario)
- Based on: The City of Masks by George Barr McCutcheon
- Produced by: Adolph Zukor; Jesse Lasky
- Starring: Robert Warwick; Lois Wilson; Theodore Kosloff
- Cinematography: Karl Brown
- Distributed by: Paramount Pictures
- Release date: June 20, 1920
- Running time: 5 reels (4,708 feet)
- Country: United States
- Language: Silent film (English intertitles)

The City of Masks is a lost 1920 silent film comedy drama produced by Famous Players–Lasky and distributed by Paramount Pictures. The film was directed by Thomas N. Heffron and starred stage star Robert Warwick.

== Cast ==
- Robert Warwick as Tommy Trotter
- Lois Wilson as Miss Emsdale
- Theodore Kosloff as Bosky
- Edward Jobson as Corr McFadden
- Jean M. Dumont as Stuyvesant Smith
- Robert Dunbar as Mr. Smith-Parvis
- Helen Dunbar as Mrs. Smith-Parvis
- Anne Schaefer as Mrs. Jacobs
- Frances Raymond as Madam Deborah
- William Boyd as Carpenter
- George Berrell as Bramble
- Snitz Edwards as Drouillard
- Richard Cummings as Moody
- T. E. Duncan as The Detective
