= Shenandoah (play) =

Shenandoah: A Military Comedy, also titled The Greater Shenandoah, a play in four acts, is a military drama of the American Civil War written by Bronson Howard in 1888.

== Synopsis ==
The first scene is a Southern home in Charleston in the early morning hours after a ball. Lieutenant Kerchival West, a Northern officer, is making a declaration of love to Gertrude Ellingham, a Southern girl. As he awaits her answer the first shot is fired by the Confederates upon Fort Sumter in Charleston harbor, beginning the war which makes the North and South enemies, and he accepts his dismissal. The second and third acts take place at the Ellingham homestead in the Shenandoah valley. Gertrude Ellingham is captured and brought a prisoner before Lieutenant West just after she has succeeded in carrying dispatches to Thornton in the Confederate lines. Thornton, the villain of the piece, is also captured later. Lieutenant West had fought a duel with him for insulting his colonel's wife, Mrs. Haverhill, with his attentions. Thornton springs at Lieutenant West, wounding him seriously. He accuses the unconscious man to Colonel Haverhill of being Mrs. Haverhill's lover, Gertrude, forgetting her devotion to the South, kneels beside West, confessing her love. Colonel Haverhill's son, Frank, has led a wild life, and has been disowned by his father. He joins the army under an assumed name, and accepts from his father, as commander, the dangerous mission of going through the enemy's lines to get the signal code of the Confederates. He captures the code, but is mortally wounded. His father attends the funeral, doing honor to his bravery, not knowing the young officer was his own son. There is a dramatic scene when the Union army is in retreat, and General Sheridan rides to the rescue turning the retreat to victory. The last act is in Washington after Lee's surrender. A long delayed letter written by his dead son explains to Colonel Haverhill how the miniature of his wife had come into Lieutenant West's possession. All the various lovers are reunited.

== Posters ==
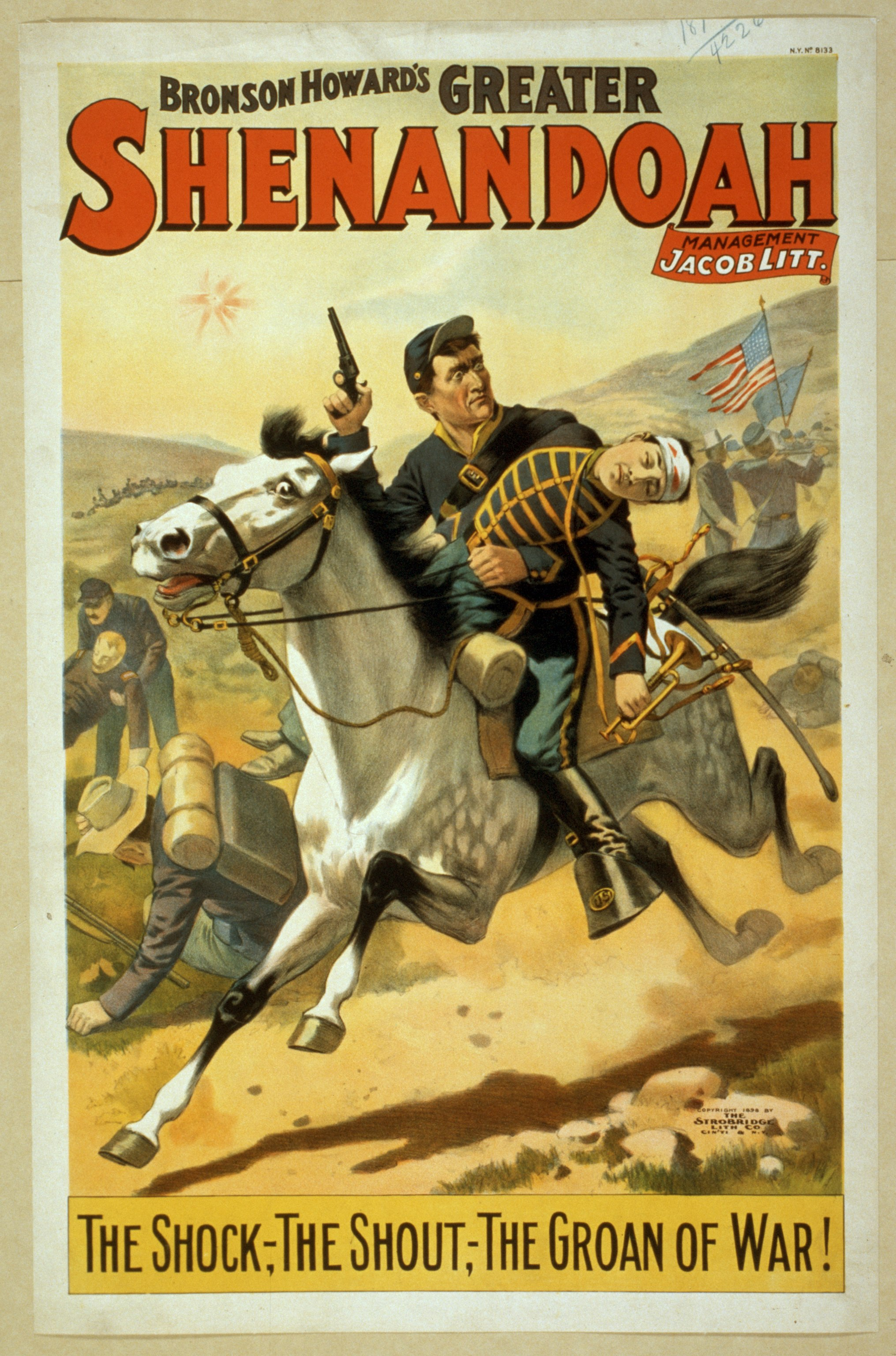

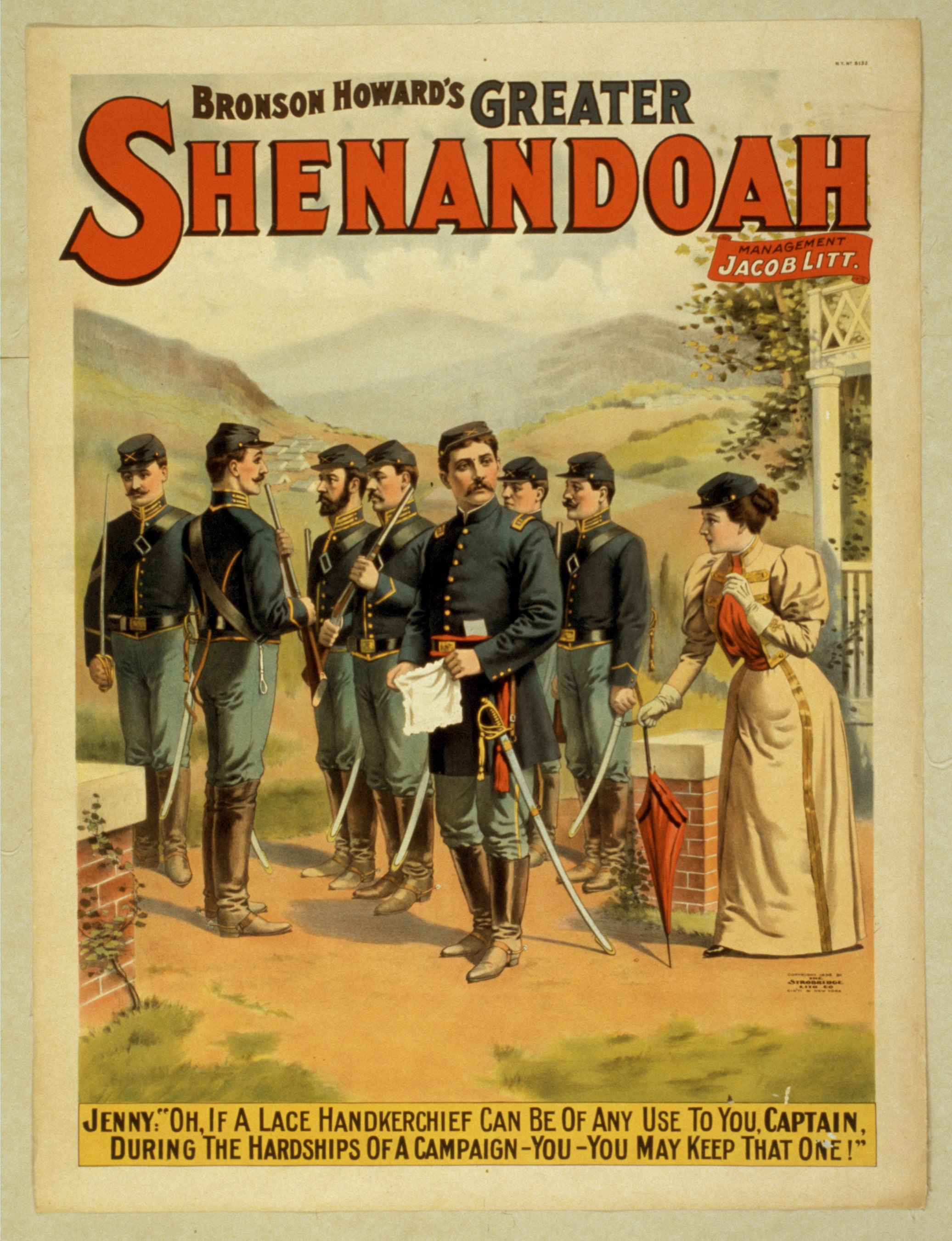

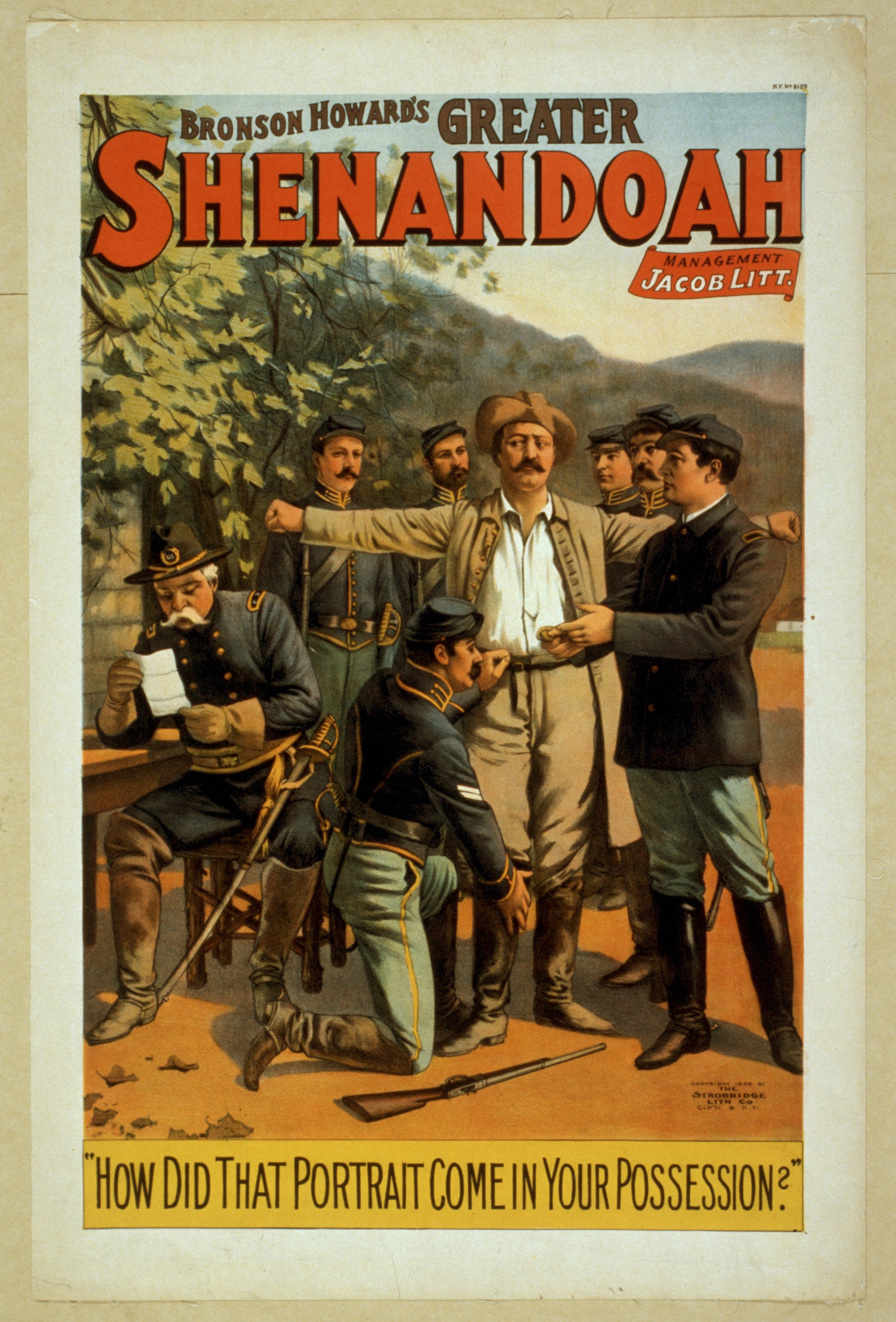

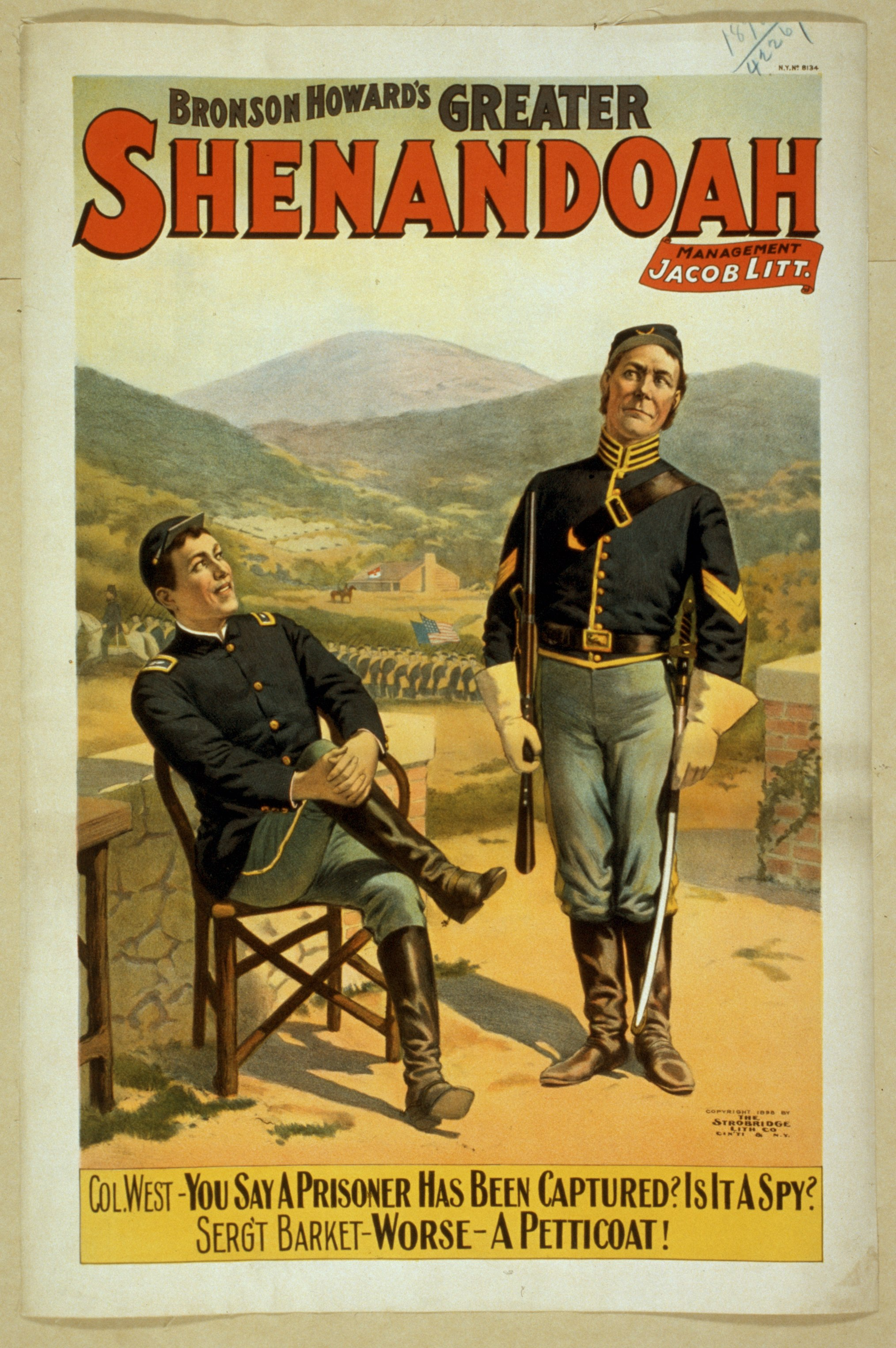

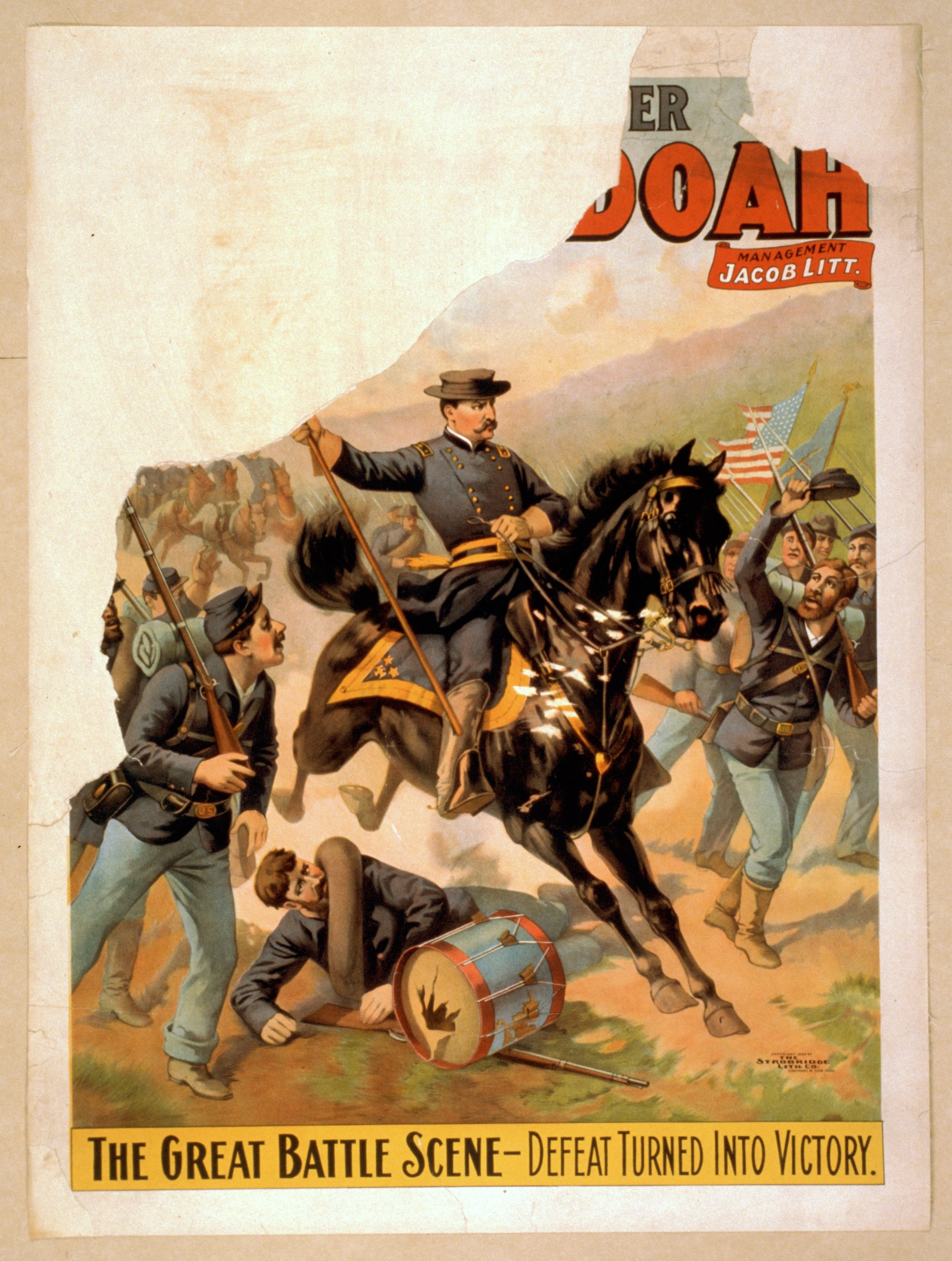

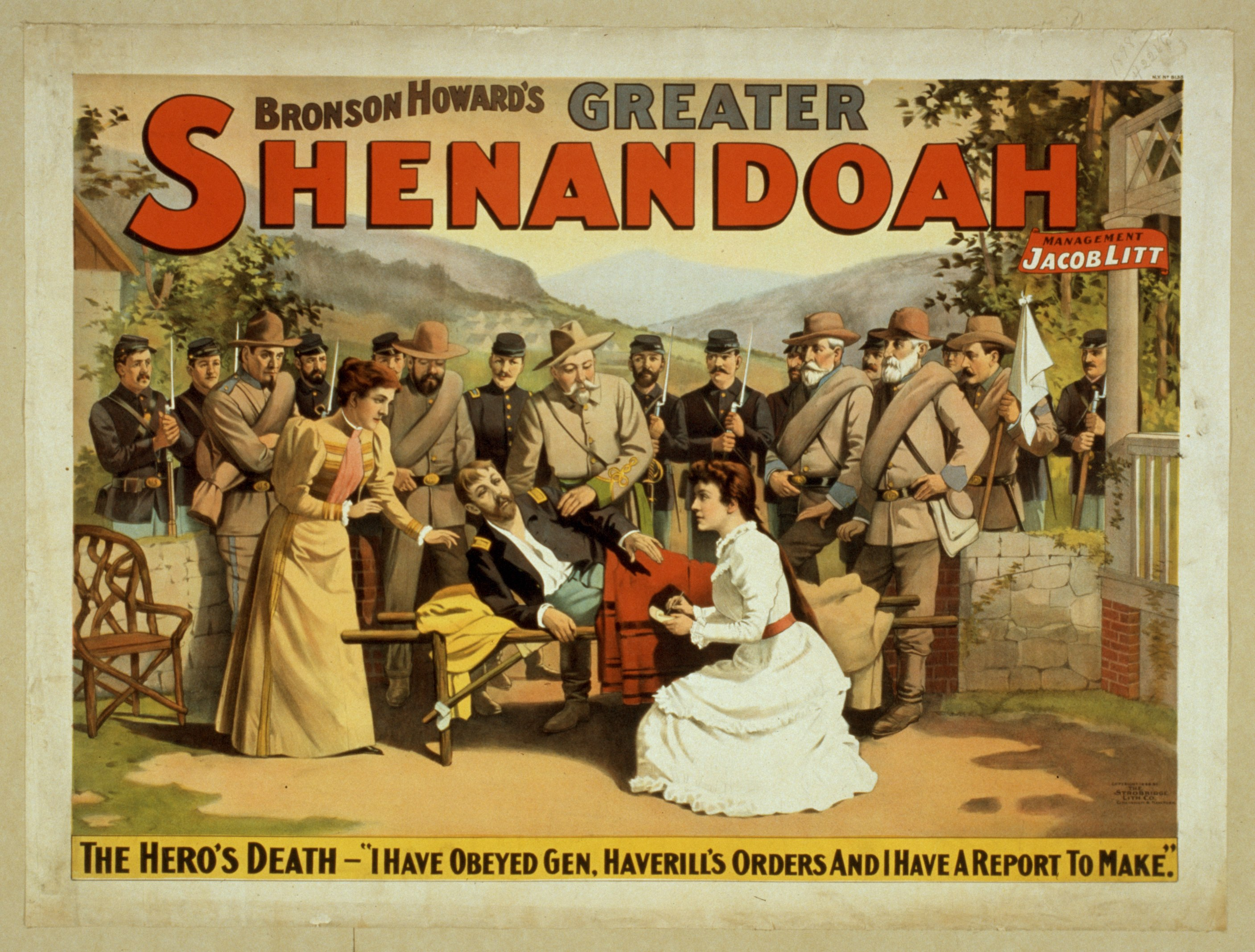

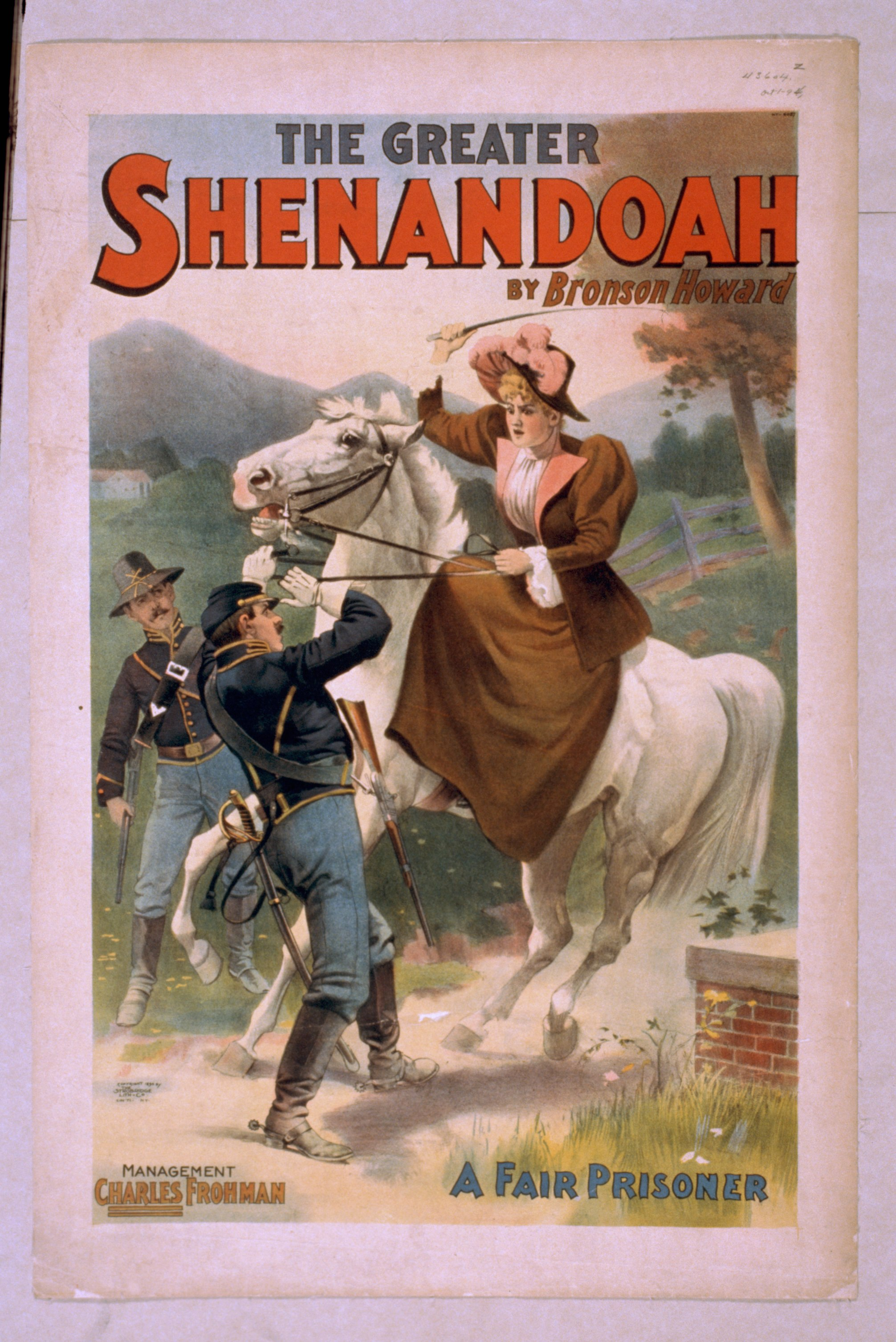

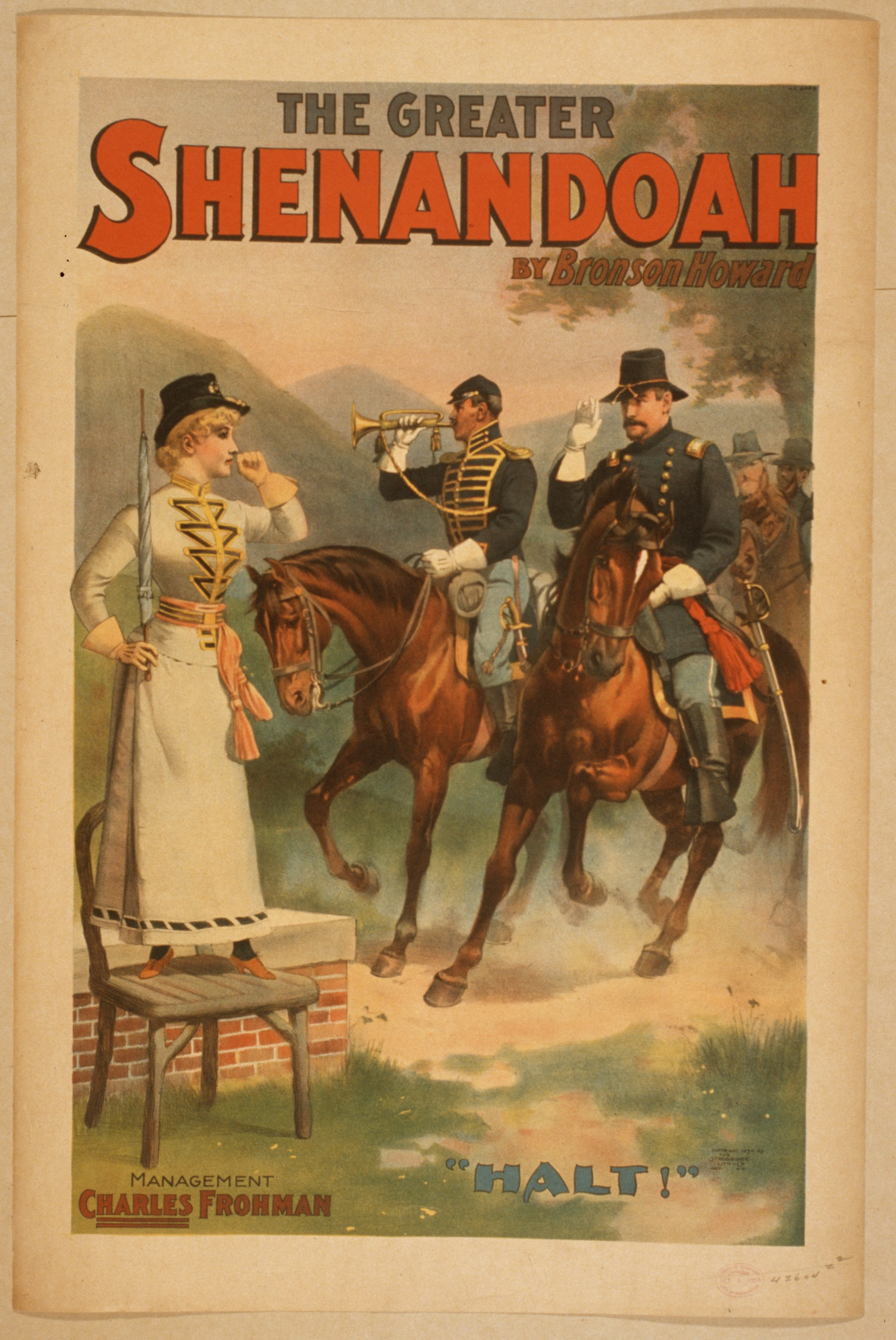

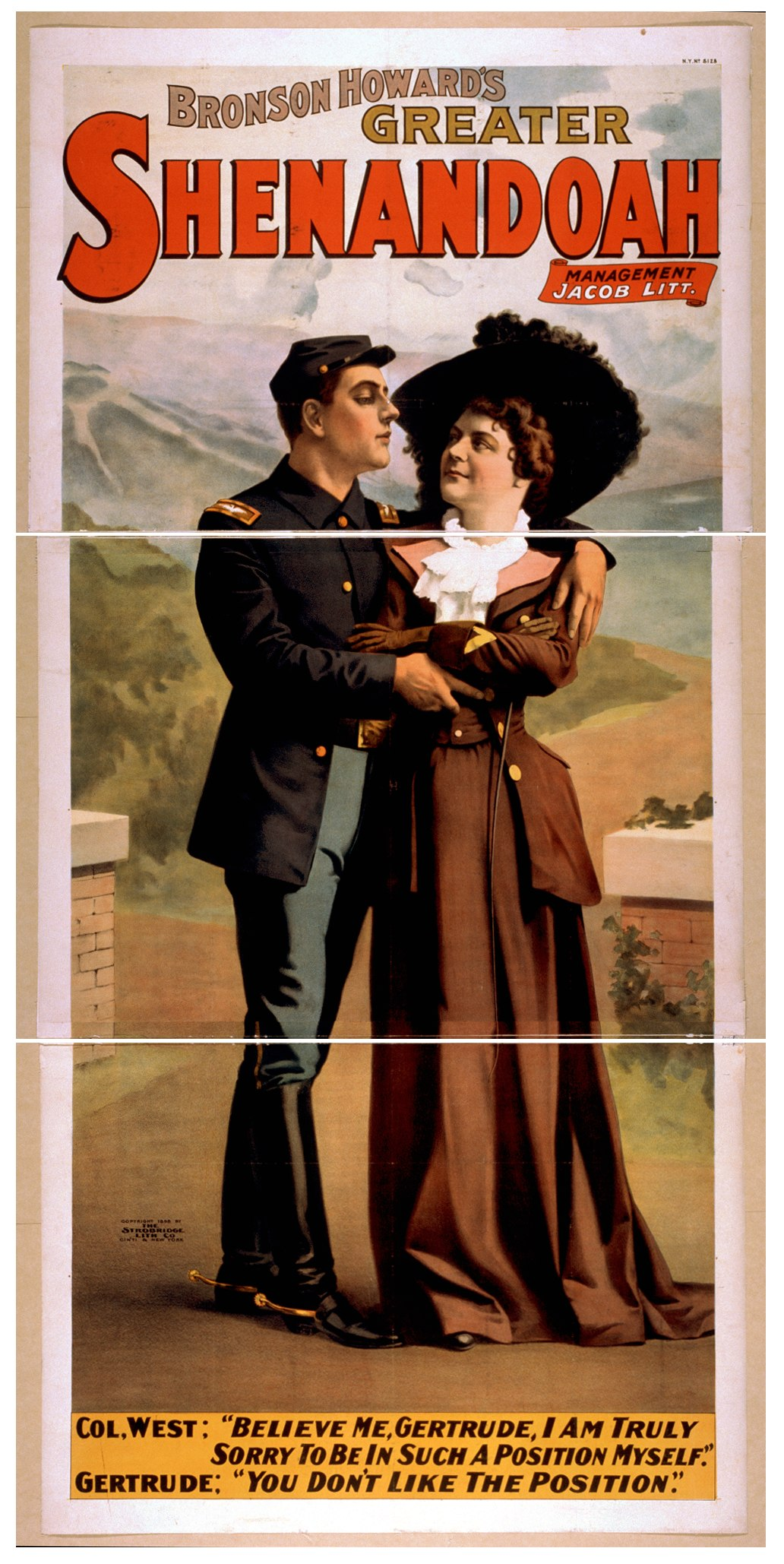

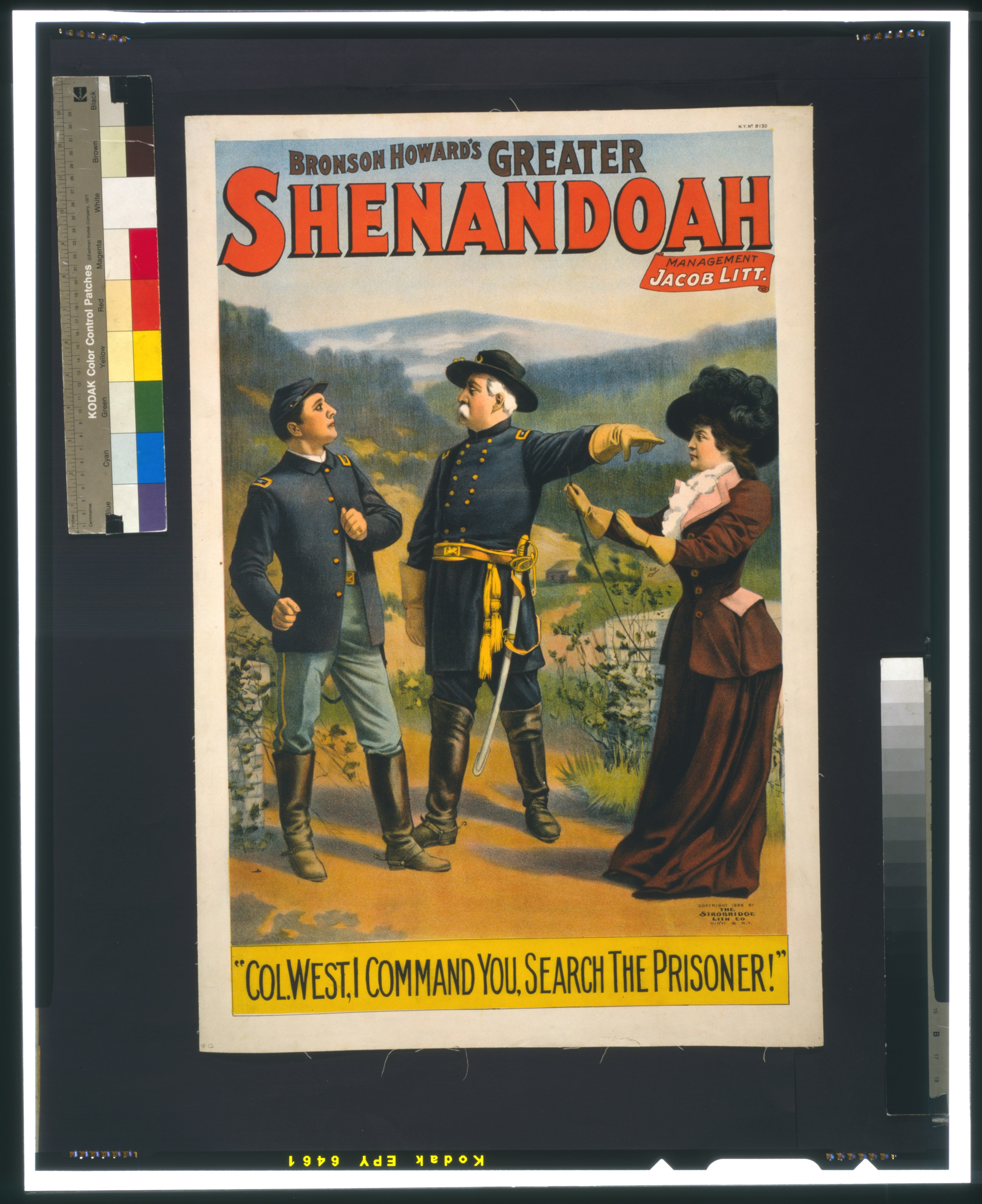

== Sources ==
- Howard, Bronson (1897). Shenandoah: A Military Comedy in Four Acts (New ed.). United States.

Attribution:

- Keller, Helen Rex (1924). "Shenandoah". The Reader's Digest of Books. The Library of the World's Best Literature. New York: The Macmillan Company. pp. 782–3.
