= Young Mrs. Winthrop (play) =

1882 play by Bronson Howard

Young Mrs. Winthrop is an 1882 play by Bronson Howard which debuted on Broadway at the Madison Square Theatre on October 9, 1882, and ran for 183 performances, closing on April 7, 1883. It was the first play for which David Belasco served as stage manager at the theater.

== Original Broadway cast ==
- Blanche Whiffen as Mrs. Ruth Winthrop
- George Clarke as Mr. Douglas Winthrop (her son)
- Carrie Turner as Constance Winthrop (his wife)
- Thomas Whiffen as Buxton Scott (a lawyer)
- Agnes Booth as Mrs. Dick Chetwyn (a lady of society)
- Maude Stuart as Edith (sister of Constance)
- Henry Miller as Herbert
- William J. Le Moyne as Dr. Mellbanke
- A.T. Smith as John (a footman)

== Adaptations ==
The play was adapted to film in 1915 and 1920.
