= Jean M. Dumont =

J. M. Dumont
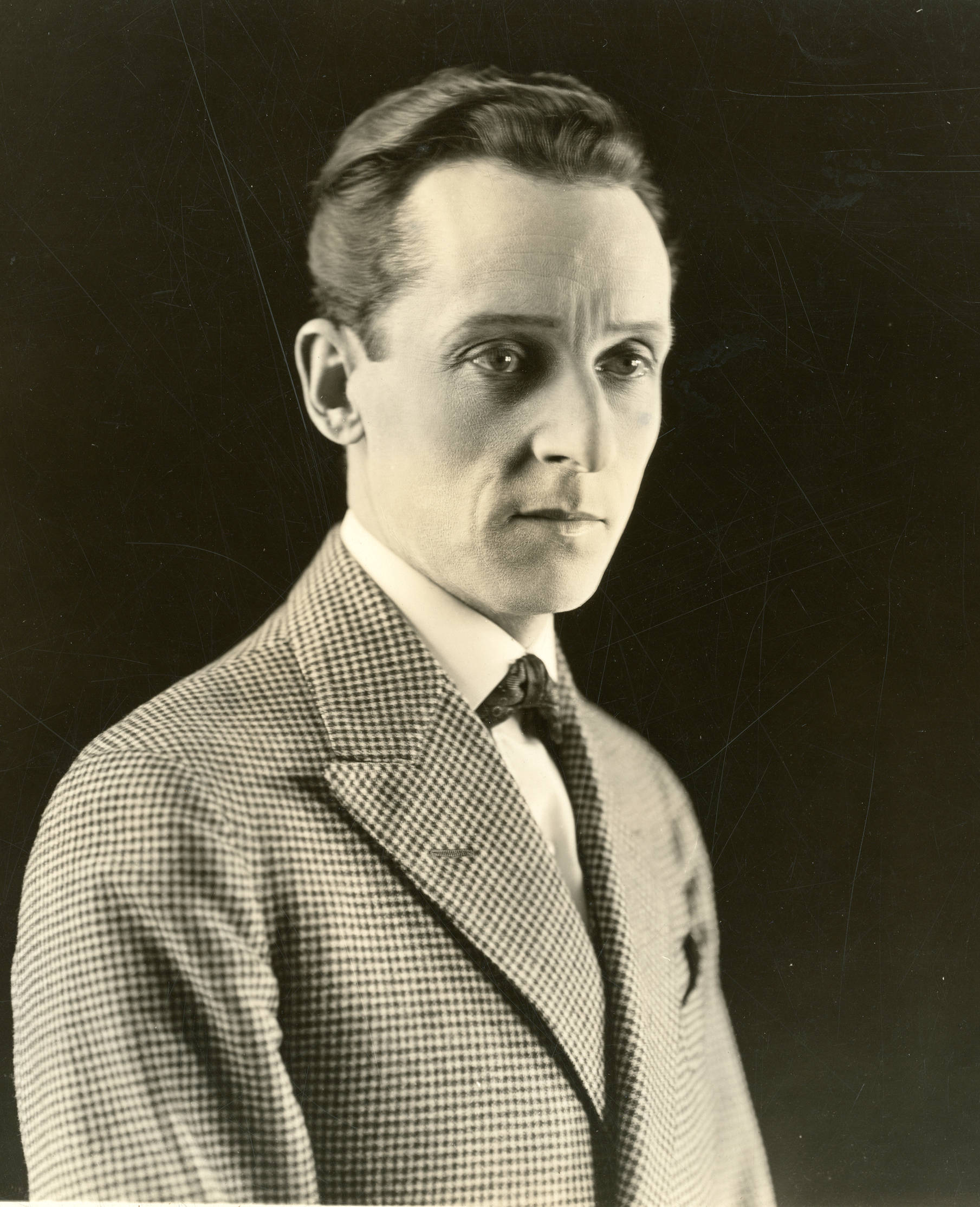
- Born: John Monte Dumont; February 7, 1879; New Orleans, Louisiana
- Died: December 19, 1959 (aged 80); Los Angeles, California
- Resting place: Forest Lawn Memorial Park, Glendale, California
- Other names: J. M. Dumont; Jean Monte Dumont; George McNamara
- Occupation: Actor

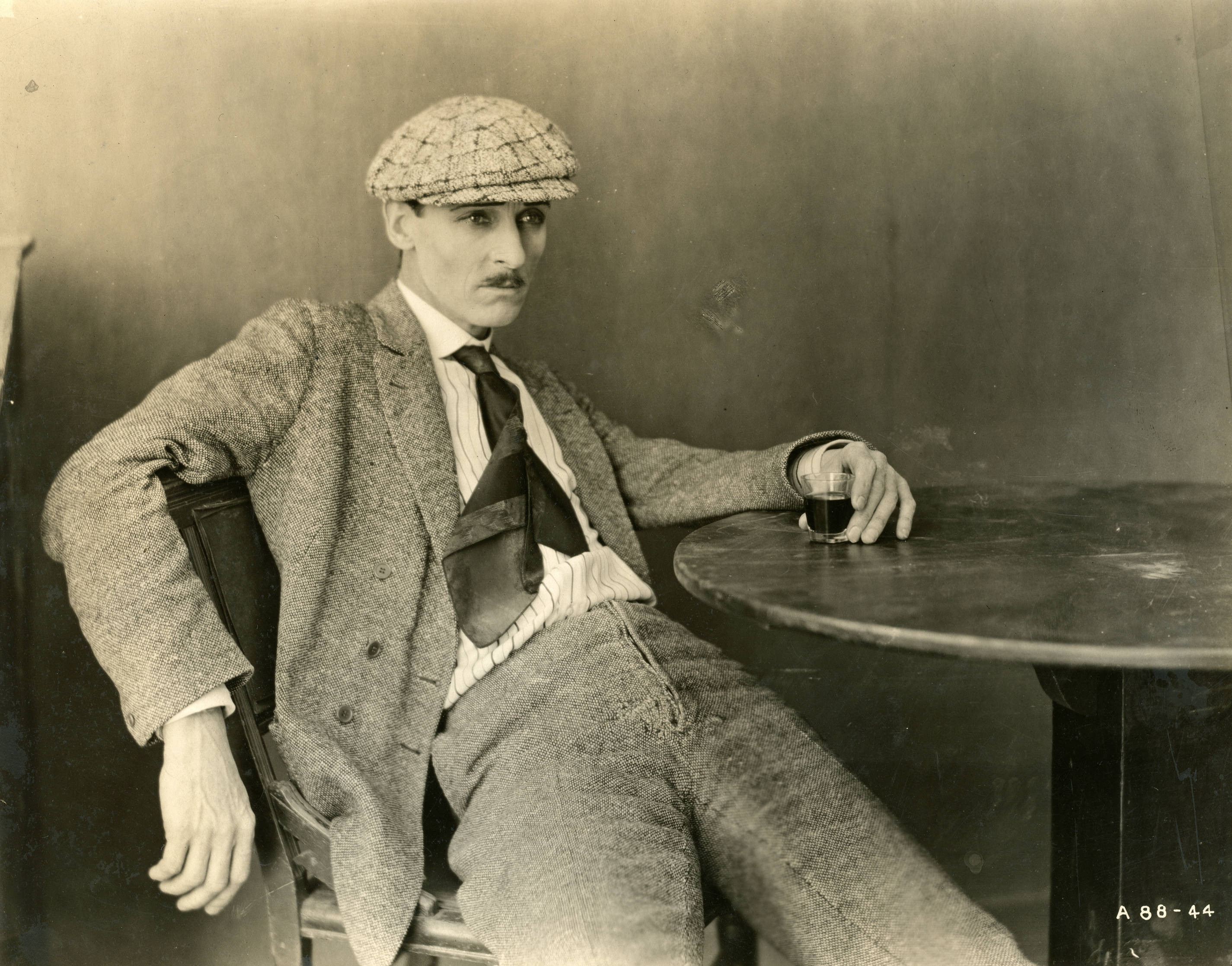
Dumont in his role as Dope in The Miracle Man.

John Monte Dumont (1879 – 1959), aka professionally J. M. Dumont, was an American actor of the silent-film era. Dumont was born in New Orleans. He spent two years making films mostly for Paramount. He was a cast member of the lost film The Miracle Man. Dumont appeared in films with Robert Warwick, Lon Chaney, Mary Miles Minter, Roscoe Arbuckle and Wallace Reid. After he apparently left film in 1921, it is unknown what his later activities were. Dumont died in Los Angeles in December 1959.

== Partial filmography ==
- The Miracle Man as The Dope
- Young Mrs. Winthrop (1919) as Dick Rodney
- Thou Art the Man (1920) as Henry Farrant
- Always Audacious (1920) as Jerry the Gent
- The City of Masks (1920) as Stuyvesant Smith
- The Dollar-a-Year Man (1921) as Tipson Blair
- Wealth (1921) as Gordon Townsend
