= Agnes Ethel =

American actress

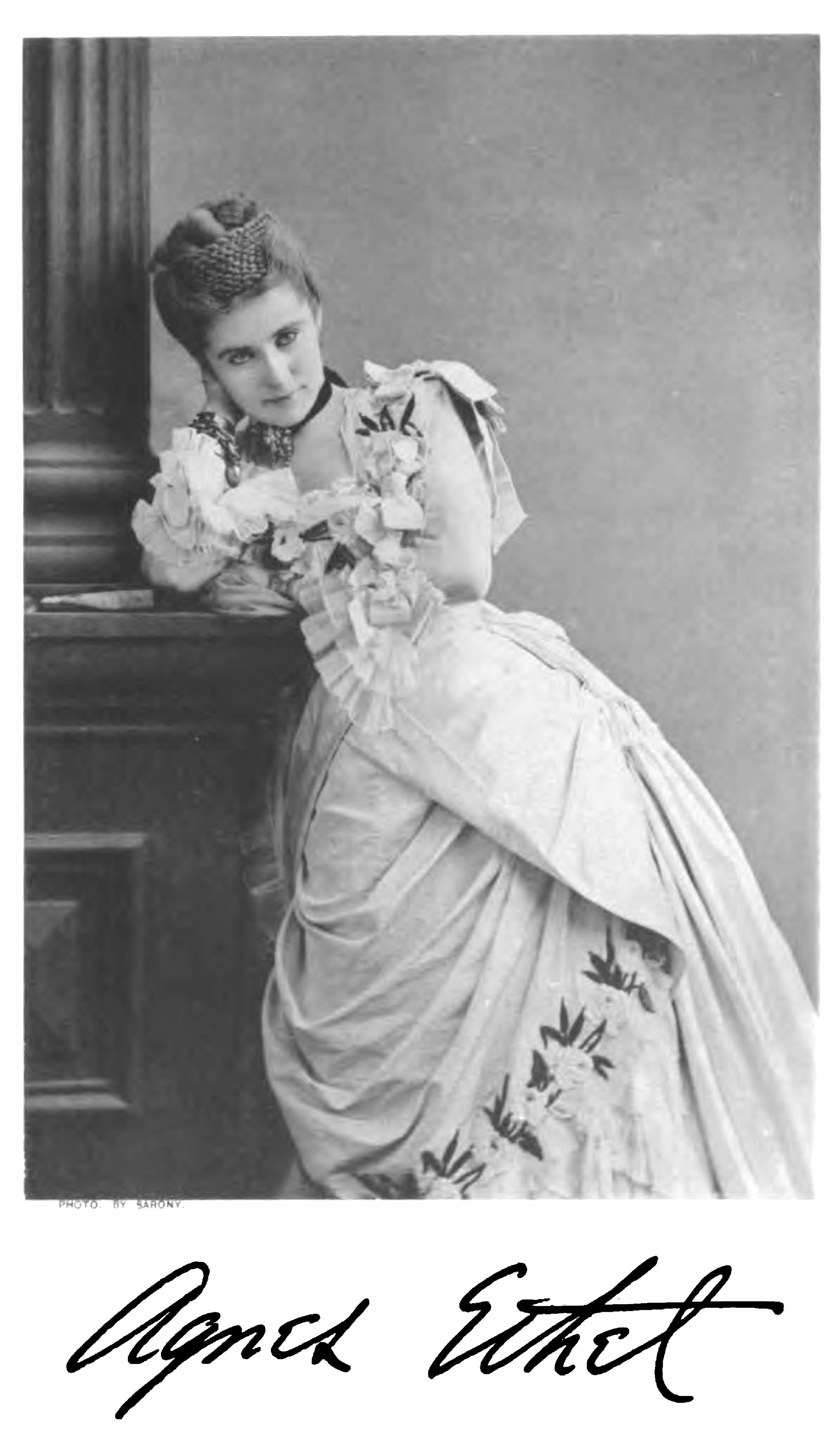
- Ethel in Players of the Present (1899)
- Born: May 1, 1845; New York City, U.S.
- Died: May 26, 1903 (aged 58); New York City, U.S.
- Other names: Agnes Ethel Tracy
- Occupation: Actress
- Years active: 1868–1872
- Spouses: Francis W. Tracy (m. 1873; died 1886); Clinton DeWitt Roudebush (m. 1890; div. 1901)

Agnes Ethel (May 1, 1845 – May 26, 1903) was a Broadway actress of the late 19th century. She performed in New York City, the city of her birth, from 1868 to 1871. Her married name was Agnes Ethel Tracy. She was especially talented in acting emotional roles.

== Theatrical career ==
She was a protégé of Mathilde Heron (1830–1877) and made her stage debut in Camille (1868), at Jerome's private theatre in New York. It was situated on the southeast corner of Twenty-Sixth Street. She studied for a year afterward, accepting minor parts.

Ethel and Fanny Davenport were among the actors in a production of a comedy, Dreams, by T. W. Robertson. It began playing at the Fifth Avenue Theatre on August 16, 1869. She was in the first production of Frou Frou in the United States. The Augustin Daly stock company staged it at the Fifth Avenue Theatre, 24th Street, one door from Broadway, on February 15, 1870. Kate Newton, Davenport, and George Clarke were other cast members. Ethel appeared in Fernande, also at the Fifth Avenue Theatre, in June 1870. A critic wrote that her acting was her best thus far.

In September 1872, she appeared in Agnes, presented by the Union Square Theatre. The play was written especially for her by Victorien Sardou. It ran for one hundred nights.

She retired at the height of her career for quiet domesticity. She took part in charities and assisted struggling actors and actresses. She performed only twice more on stage, appearing on both occasions in support of charity.

== Marriages ==
Ethel married Francis W. Tracy, a millionaire from Buffalo, New York in October 1873. Tracy died in 1886. His will was contested by his first wife for her daughter. The entire fortune was awarded to Ethel after it was contested in court. In October 1890, she married Clinton DeWitt Roudebush; they divorced in 1901.

== Death ==
Ethel died in 1903 at 80 Irving Place in New York City. She is buried in Buffalo. The cause of death was heart disease which began a year earlier. She was engaged to marry theatrical manager Francis Mahler when she died. The wedding had been postponed because of Ethel's protracted sickness.
