= Charles Alfred Byrne =

American dramatist (1848–1909)

Charles Alfred Byrne (1848–1909) was an American journalist and playwright.

Byrne was involved in a number of publications including Truth and The Journalist. He translated the libretto of Debussy's opera Pelléas et Mélisande into English for the Metropolitan Opera.

He was involved in the 1880 Morey letter affair.
