= The Journalist (newspaper) =

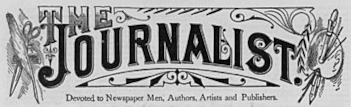
- The Journalist, nameplate of 1886
- Type: Weekly newspaper
- Founder(s): Leander Richardson and Charles Alfred Byrne
- Founded: March 22, 1884; 141 years ago
- Ceased publication: 1907; 119 years ago; merged into Editor & Publisher
- Language: English

The Journalist (1884 - 1907) was the first successful American trade newspaper covering journalism. It was founded as The Journalist: A Magazine for All Who Read and Write by Leander Richardson and Charles Alfred Byrne and published weekly, commencing with its first issue on March 22, 1884.

John Christian Freund became a partner in late 1884, and in January 1885, Charles J. Smith (former managing editor of the New York Star) bought the paper. Allan Forman was a long-time editor and owner of the paper.

The paper published weekly through March 23, 1895, then suspended and restarted from April 17, 1897, to June 16, 1906, before switching to a monthly publication schedule.

The paper was merged into Editor & Publisher (founded in 1901) in 1907.
