= Leander Richardson =

American journalist and playwright

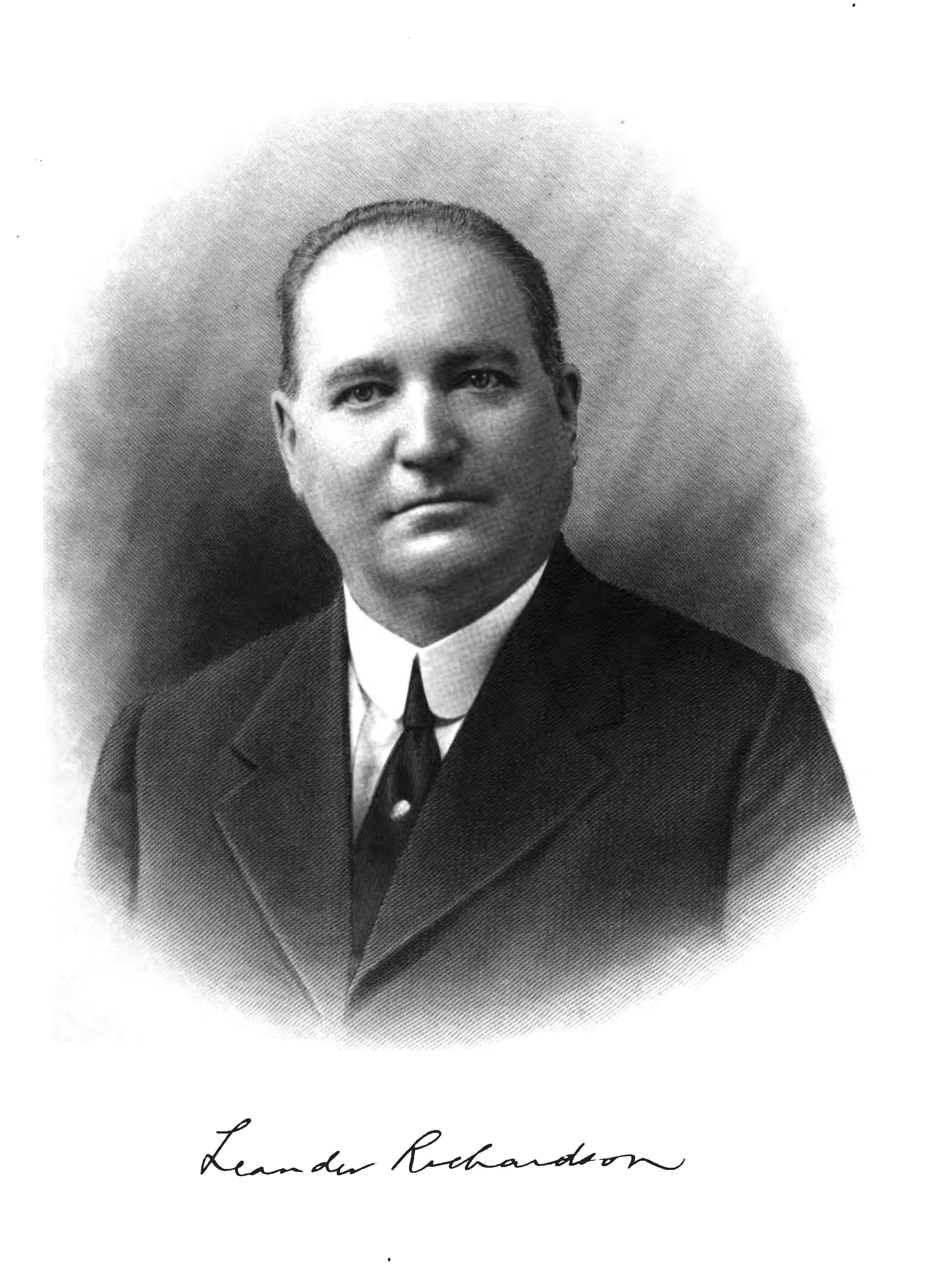
Richardson

Leander Pease Richardson (February 28, 1856 – February 2, 1918) was an American journalist, playwright, theatrical writer and author.

== Early life ==
Richardson was born in Cincinnati, Ohio in 1856. He was the son of Albert D. Richardson (a journalist and Union spy during the American Civil War), and Mary Louise Pease. The young Richardson was known to be of a "temperamental" disposition from an early age.

== Journalism career ==
When 16, Richardson began working for the Chicago Inter Ocean newspaper; and later became a European correspondent for the Boston Herald. In addition to other newspaper and magazine posts, he served as managing editor of The Morning Telegraph when that newspaper was first founded. He was known for changing jobs often.

He was one of the founding board members and Assistant Secretary of the Actors' Order of Friendship, a benevolent society founded in Philadelphia in 1849.

In 1884 he founded The Journalist trade magazine with Charles Alfred Byrne.

Later in life, he joined the staff of The New York Times.

=== Notable interview ===
In 1876 while in Deadwood (in the Dakota Territory), he happened to interview Wild Bill Hickok the day before his death, and wrote about the event a number of times.

== Theatrical writer ==
Richardson was best known as a writer on theatrical topics, which he focused on for thirty years. He also became a playwright, writing seven plays and three books. An early example of this work was the play, Anselma, which opened at New York's Madison Square Theatre in September 1885, for which he was the bookwriter.

== Author ==
Richardson authored several books and short stories based on his travels.

== Death ==
Richardson died of pneumonia in February 1918. His obituary in The Fourth Estate, a journal on the newspaper industry, called Richardson "one of the most widely known dramatic editors in this country."
