= Bronson Howard =

American dramatist (1842–1908)

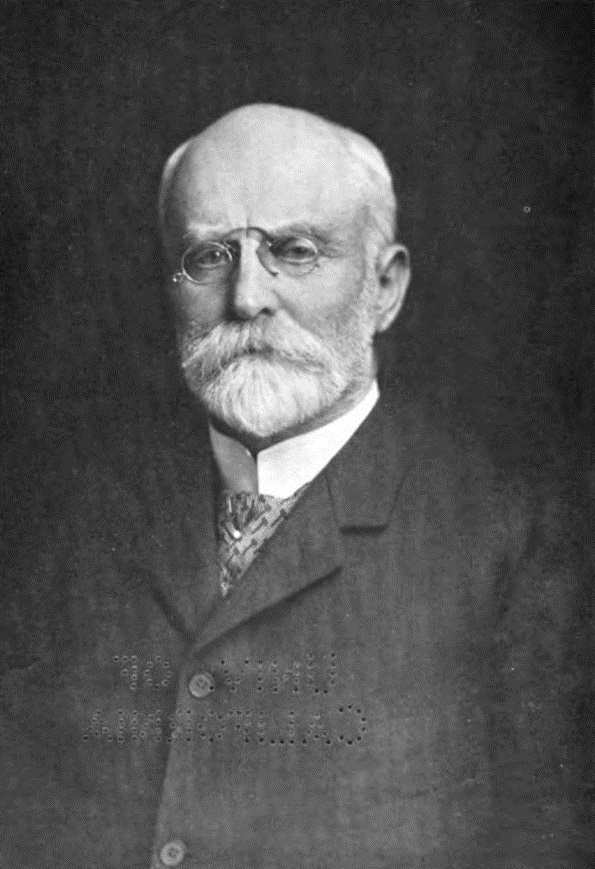
- Born: Bronson Crocker Howard; October 7, 1842; Detroit, Michigan, US
- Died: August 4, 1908 (aged 65); Avon-by-the-Sea, New Jersey, US
- Occupation: Dramatist

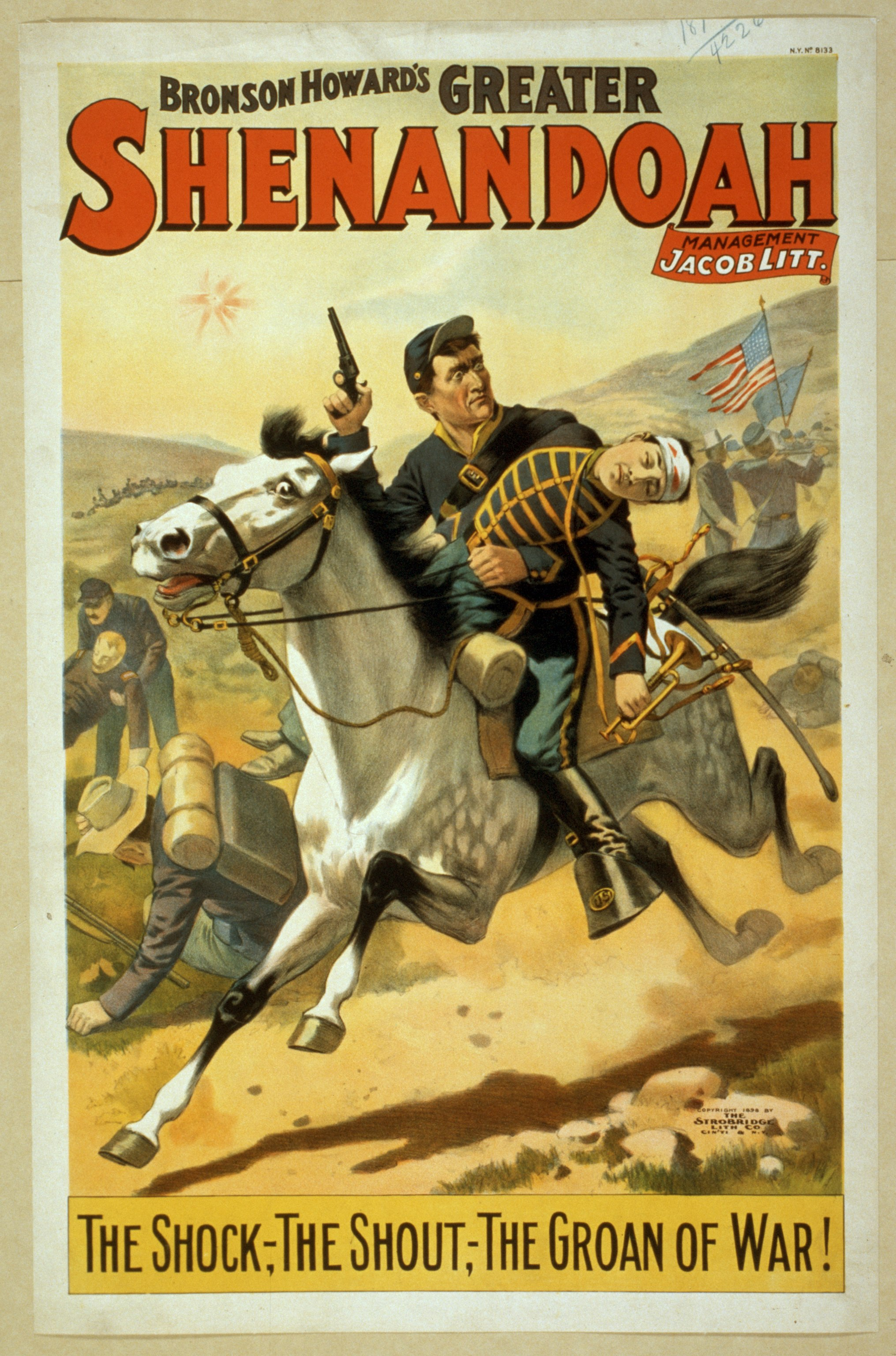
Howard's Shenandoah

Bronson Crocker Howard (October 7, 1842 – August 4, 1908) was an American dramatist.

== Biography ==
Howard was born on October 7, 1842, in Detroit. His father, Charles Howard, was its Mayor in 1849. He prepared for college at New Haven, Connecticut, but instead of entering Yale he turned to Journalism in New York City. From 1867 to 1872, he worked on several newspapers, among them the Evening Mail and the Tribune. As early as 1864, he had written a dramatic piece (Fantine) which was played in Detroit. His first popular production was Saratoga, produced by Augustin Daly in 1870. It was very successful and became the first of a long series of pieces which gave Howard a leading position among American playwrights.

Howard married a sister of actor Charles Wyndham. He had homes in New Rochelle, New York and London, where some of his plays were similarly popular. He was a member of the American Academy of Arts and Letters.

The English newspaper The Yorkshire Evening Post reported in 1894:

Mr Bronson Howard, the American playwright, calls the first stage of his work, "the smoking stage." He smokes for weeks, even months, only making notes.

Howard died on August 4, 1908, aged 65, in Avon-by-the-Sea, New Jersey, where he had gone to regain his strength.

== Works ==
- The Banker's Daughter (1878)
- Old Love Letters (1878)
- Young Mrs. Winthrop (1882)
- One of our Girls (1885)
- The Henrietta (1887; revived in 1913 as The New Henrietta)
- Shenandoah (1889)
- Aristocracy (1892)
- The Social Pirates (1916)

== Literature ==
- Moses, Monteose Jonas (1911). The American Dramatist. Boston: Little, Brown & Company.
