= Madison Square Theatre =

Former New York theatre

- Daly’s, Daly’s Fifth Avenue Theatre, Fifth Avenue Hall, Fifth Avenue Opera House, Fifth Avenue Theatre, Hoyt’s Madison Square Theatre, Hoyt’s, Minnie Cumming’s Drawing-Room Theatre
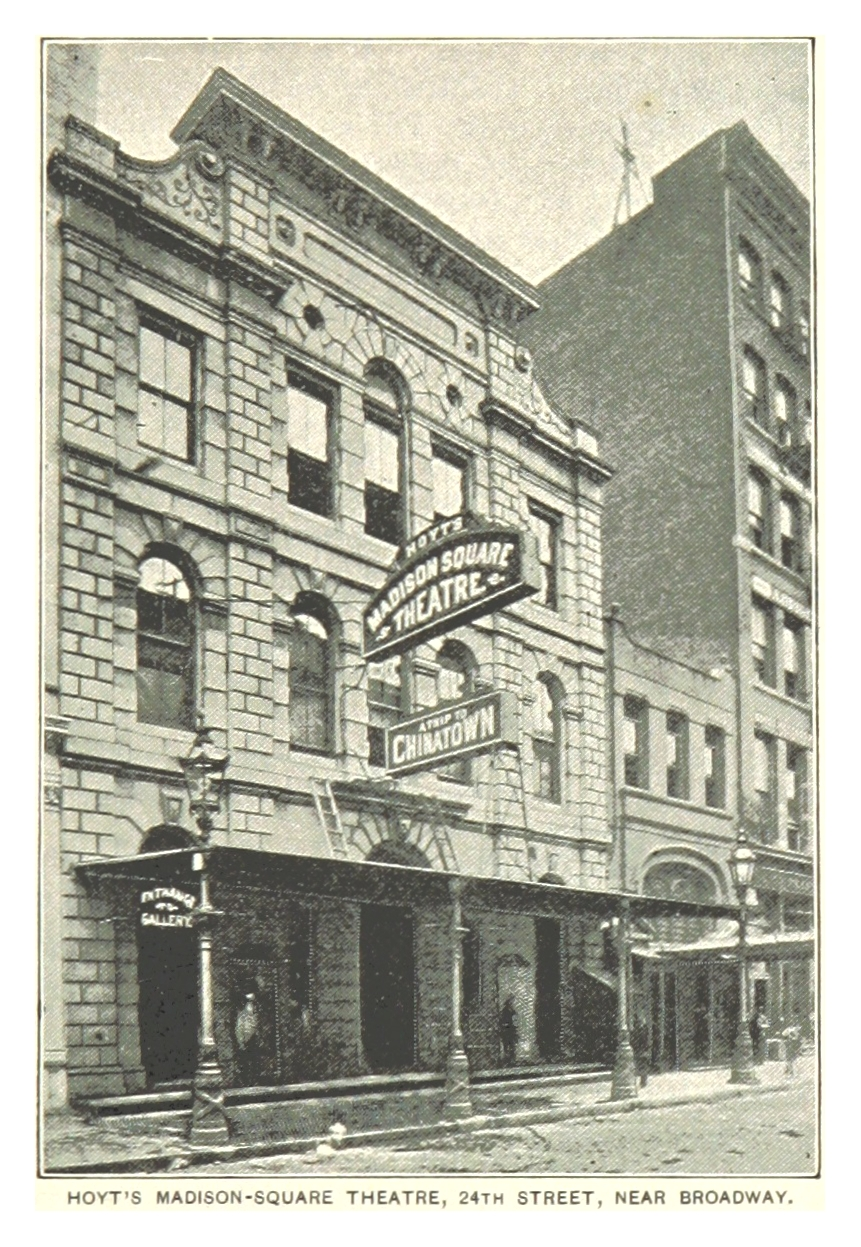
- Interactive map of Madison Square Theatre
- Address: Broadway and W. 24th St. New York, NY
- Coordinates: 40.7422°N 73.9901°W
- Owner: A.R. Eno (land), various (building)
- Operator: George Christy, John Brougham, James Fisk Jr., Augustin Daly, Steele MacKaye, Mallory Bros., A.M. Palmer, Charles H. Hoyt, Frank McKee, Walter N. Lawrence
- Capacity: 900, +100 standees
- Type: Broadway

Construction
- Opened: 1865
- Closed: 1908
- Reopened: 1877
- Demolished: 1908
- Rebuilt: 1868, 1877, 1879-80
- Years active: 1865-1873, 1877-1908
- Architect: Various/unknown

The Madison Square Theatre was a Broadway theatre in Manhattan, on the south side of 24th Street between Sixth Avenue and Broadway (which intersects Fifth Avenue near that point). It was built in 1863, operated as a theater from 1865 to 1908, and demolished in 1908 to make way for an office building. The Madison Square Theatre was the scene of important developments in stage technology, theatre design, and theatrical tour management. For about half its history it had other names including the Fifth Avenue Theatre, Daly's Fifth Avenue Theatre, Hoyt's Madison Square Theatre, and Hoyt's Theatre.

== History ==
Merchant and real estate magnate Amos R. Eno leased land next to his Fifth Avenue Hotel in 1862 to James Fisk Jr., who built an after-hours gold trading exchange during the U.S. Civil War. The “regular stock exchange” found the competition disruptive and soon shut down the operation. The building became a performance space, the Fifth Avenue Opera House, used by George Christy and other minstrel shows from 1865 to 1867 when C.H. Garland took it over as the Fifth Avenue Theatre for burlesque shows. The theatre closed at the beginning of 1868 after one minstrel show manager murdered another after attending a performance. John Brougham briefly managed it as Brougham's Theatre in 1869, followed by building owner Fisk, who restored the Fifth Avenue name and presented French opéra bouffe.

Augustin Daly became manager later in 1869, sometimes calling it the Fifth Avenue Theatre, sometimes Daly's Fifth Avenue or simply Daly's Theatre. The house (seating area) during this period was described as being “plated with mirrors for the illusion of immensity,” with a palette of “blush rose, neatly framed in white, with delicate boundaries of gold.” Capacity was 900, or 1,000 with standees, and gas jets provided interior lighting. When the theatre burned to the ground after a matinee on New Year's Day 1873, Daly moved his company and the Fifth Avenue Theatre name to an existing theatre on 28th and Broadway. The name similarities continue to cause confusion today. It was four years until a new building appeared, first called the Fifth Avenue Hall, where a magician named Heller performed for several months in 1877, then Minnie Cumming's Drawing Room Theatre.

George and Marshall Mallory then erected yet another building on the site, for actor-director-playwright Steele Mackaye who had produced a few shows in the small hall in 1879 under a name they kept, the Madison Square Theatre. Mackaye's famous stage technology improvements included the "double stage", an elevator the size of the full stage that was raised and lowered by counter-weights and reduced scene changes to one or two minutes from five or more. The double stage required the builders to excavate an extra-deep foundation. Ventilation featured a primitive form of air conditioning, with cool air drawn in from the roof and circulated to perforations under the seats. To increase stage-room for action and house-room for seats, the orchestra was in a balcony above the stage, and the conductor received "cues by means of electric signals and reflectors." Interior decoration was meant to evoke an intimate drawing-room, with imitation-mahogany trim, gold and pale colors, Shakespeare illustrations, and a Tiffany-designed drop curtain that burned in an otherwise uneventful fire a few weeks after the reopening.

The Mallory brothers and Mackaye soon fell out, and Mackaye lost the rights to his single commercially successful play, Hazel Kirke, and his position at the theatre. By then Business Manager Daniel Frohman had hired his brothers Gustave and Charles. They used Hazel Kirke's long run to implement the nation's first theatrical touring organization with multiple companies of a single play and developed their promotional and management skills. The Frohmans, along with Marcus Klaw and Abraham Lincoln Erlanger, who met while working in the Madison Square Theatre's publicity department, and David Belasco, who also worked at the theatre in this period, became major forces in American theatrical management over the next 35 years.

The Rev. Dr. George Mallory, owner (with his brother) and editor of the Episcopal Church publication The Churchman, sought to use their ownership of the theatre "to elevate the moral tone of the American stage", among other things by running only American-written plays cast almost exclusively with American actors. The Mallorys managed the theatre on this principal themselves for four years. In 1885 they brought in impresario A.M. Palmer who bought them out and managed until 1891, with a more conventionally international mix of plays. Palmer was followed by playwright/director Charles H. Hoyt, along with Charles Thompson who died in 1893 and Frank McKee, who ran the theatre after Hoyt became incapacitated in 1898. During this time the theatre was variously known as Hoyt's Madison Square Theatre, or simply Hoyt's Theatre.

The Madison Square Theatre name returned in 1898, and remained through the management of Walter N. Lawrence until Eno's descendants demolished the building and the Fifth Avenue Hotel in 1908. By that time the "Theater District" had moved uptown to the Times Square area around 42nd Street.

== Productions ==
In its forty years of operation some 250 plays were produced at the Madison Square Theatre. Following are productions that ran at least six weeks, noting runs of 100 or more performances.

Daly Era (1869-1873)

- Frou-Frou, Augustin Daly, adaptation of Ludovic Halévy and Henri Meilhac's work, 1870. 112 performances.
- Saratoga, Bronson Howard, 1870. 101 performances.
- Divorce, Augustin Daly, dramatization of Anthony Trollope's novel He Knew He Was Right, 1871. 200 performances.
- Article 47, Augustin Daly, 1872.
- Diamonds, Bronson Howard, 1872.

Mackaye and Mallory Eras (1879-1885)

- Hazel Kirke, Steele Mackaye, 1880. 486 performances.
- The Professor, William Gillette, 1881. 151 performances.
- Esmerelda, Frances Hodgson Burnett, 1881. 350 performances.
- Young Mrs. Winthrop, Bronson Howard, 1882. 183 performances.
- The Russian Honeymoon, Mrs. Burton Harrison, 1883.
- The Rajah, or Wyncot's Ward, William Young, 1883. 236 performances.
- Alpine Roses, Hjalmar Hjorth Boyesen, 1884.
- May Blossom, or Two Loves, David Belasco, 1884. 170 performances. Benjamin Maginley as Tom Blossom.
- The Private Secretary, Sir Charles Henry Hawtrey, 1884. 200 performances.
- Sealed Instructions, Mrs. Julia Campbell Ver Planck, 1885.
- Anselma (1885), English-language adaptation of Victorien Sardou's 1873 play Andréa which was created by Leander Richardson

Palmer Era (1885-1891)

- Saints and Sinners, Henry Arthur Jones, 1885. 111 performances.
- Prince Karl, A.C. Gunter, 1886. 126 performances.
- Held by the Enemy, William Gillette, 1886.
- Jim the Penman, Sir Charles L. Young, 1886. 176 performances.
- Captain Swift, Dion Boucicault, adaptation of Charles Haddon Chambers' work, 1888. 162 performances.
- Aunt Jack, Ralph R. Lumley, 1889. 200 performances.
- Beau Brummell, Clyde Fitch, 1890. 156 performances.
- The Pharisee, Malcolm Watson, 1891.
- Dinner at Eight, J.A. Ritchie, 1891.

Hoyt-McKee-Lawrence Era (1894-1908)

- A Trip to Chinatown, book and lyrics by Charles H. Hoyt, music by Percy Gaunt, 1891. 657 performances – a record for New York theatre that held until 1919 (Irene).
- A Temperance Town, Charles H. Hoyt, 1893. 125 performances.
- A Milk White Flag: And Its Battle Scarred Followers on the Field of Mars and in the Court of Venus, Charles H. Hoyt, 1894. 153 performances.
- The Foundling, William Lestocq, E. M. Robson, 1895. 104 performances.
- The Man Upstairs, Augustus Thomas, 1895.
- The Gay Parisians, Georges Feydeau, Maurice Desvallières, 1895. 120 performances.
- A Black Sheep and How it Came to Washington, book by Charles H. Hoyt, music by Richard Stahl, Charles H. Hoyt, William Devere, Otis Harlan, Mr. Conor, and Mr. Kelly, 1896. 144 performances.
- A Florida Enchantment, A. C. Gunter, 1896.
- A Contented Woman, Charles H. Hoyt, 1897.
- The Man from Mexico, Alexandre Bisson, Edmond Gondinet and H.A. Du Souchet, 1897.
- Oh, Susannah!, 1898.
- Dangerfield '95, Mildred Dowling, 1898.
- On and Off, Alexandre Bisson, 1898.
- Because She Loved Him So, William Gillette, 1899. 144 performances.
- Why Smith Left Home, George Broadhurst, 1899.
- Wheels Within Wheels, R.C. Carton, 1899.
- Coralie and Company, Dressmakers, Albin Vallabreque, Maurice Hennequin, 1900.
- Hodge, Podge & Co., adapted from the German by George V. Hobart, lyrics by Walter Ford, music by John W. Bratton and Harry Pleon, 1900.
- On the Quiet, Augustus Thomas, 1901. 160 performances.
- The Liberty Belles, book and lyrics by Harry B. Smith, 1901. 104 performances.
- Sweet and Twenty, Basil Hood, 1901.
- The Diplomat, Martha Morton, 1902.
- The Two Schools, Alfred Capus, 1902.
- The Secret of Polichinelle, Pierre Wolff, 1904. 124 performances.
- Mrs. Temple's Telegram (known on the road as Who's Brown), Frank Wyatt, 1905.
- The Prince Chap, Edward Peple, 1905. 106 performances.
- The Man on the Box, Grace Livingston Furniss from Harold McGrath's novel, 1905. 111 performances.
- David Garrick, Charles J. Bell, 1905.
- The Three of Us, Rachel Crothers, 1906. 227 performances.

== Bibliography ==
- Brown, Thomas Allston, A History of the New York Stage from the First Performance in 1732 to 1901, Volume 2, (New York: Dodd, Mead and Company), 1903.
- Chapman, John, and Garrison P. Sherwood, eds., The Best Plays of 1894-1899, (New York: Dodd, Mead, & Company), 1955.
- "Heard on Broadway", Theatre Magazine, V 35 No 255, June 1922, p. 356.
- "Madison Square Theatre", Internet Broadway Database, www.ibdb.com.
- Mantle, Burns, and Garrison P. Sherwood, eds., The Best Plays of 1899-1909, (Philadelphia: The Blakiston Company), 1944.
- Searles, Stanhope, "Six Books of the Month: Charles Frohman, Manager and Man," The Bookman, v44 n3, Nov. 1916, p. 306.
- "Another Disaster.: Total Destruction of the Fifth-Avenue Theatre by Fire. The Building Fortunately Empty at the Time, Rapid and Fierce Progress of the Flames, Exciting Scenes in the Lobbies of the Adjoining Hotels, Heroic and Successful Efforts of the Firemen," The New York Times, Jan. 2, 1873, p. 1.
- "The Madison-Square Theatre.: Mr. Mackaye's Improvements In The Stage Mechanism," The New York Times, Feb. 1, 1880, p. 5.
- "The Madison-Square to Go: Mr. Eno Will Tear the Theatre Down. After the Lease Expires An Extension to the Fifth Avenue Hotel Will be Erected on the Site," The New York Times, July 18, 1888, p. 1. (Eno changed his mind shortly after this article was published and did not tear down the theatre.)
- "Rev. G.S. Mallory's Death: He Was a Noted Man Whose Career Was an Eventful, Interesting, and Influential One, Invested Money in Dramas. The Mallory Family Built the Madison Square Theatre and Sent Out "Hazel Kirke" Companies—Wholesome Plays Only Presented," The New York Times, Mar. 3, 1897, p. 1.
- "Charles H. Hoyt Is Dead: Well-Known Playwright Succumbs To Paresis At Charlestown, N.H. His Illness Is A Long One, Health Began to Fail After Death of Second Wife Early in 1898 – Property May Go To State of New Hampshire," The New York Times, Nov. 21, 1900, p. 1.
- "Madison Square Theatre to Close," The New York Times, Feb. 28, 1908, p. 7.
