= John Needham's Double =

1885 novel by Joseph Hatton, 1891 play, and 1916 film

John Needham's Double: A Story Founded Upon Fact
- Author: Joseph Hatton
- Language: English
- Genre: Novel
- Publisher: John & Robert Maxwell (U.K.) / Harper (U.S.)
- Publication date: 1885
- Pages: 208 pp

John Needham's Double is an 1885 novel and 1891 play by Joseph Hatton, and 1916 silent film.

== Novel ==
The novel is subtitled "A Story Founded on Fact" and is based on the story of Irish financier and politician John Sadleir, who committed suicide.

The Saturday Review negatively reviewed the book, calling it "simply the story of John Sadleir .. with certain highly improbable, not to say impossible, additions and corrections of Mr. Hatton's own. The story itself is neither interesting not instructive, nor yet amusing.... However, Mr. Hatton must not be taken too seriously. Lovers of cheap sensation will not be hypercritical, and will probably find John Needham's Double exciting enough." Punch's review called it a shilling dreadful but was slightly more positive: "there is no room for tall writing, or mere padding, when a real good story has to be told in two hundred small pages of print large enough to defy twilight and railway-carriage lamps."

== Play ==
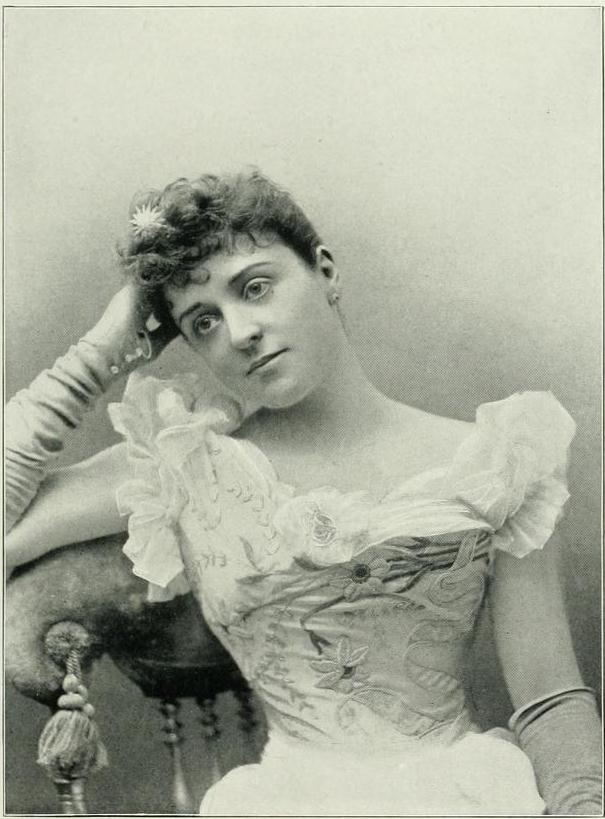
Actress Marie Burroughs as Kate Norbury in the 1891 stage adaptation of the novel

Augustus Thomas modified Hatton's play for A.M. Palmer's production in New York starring Edward Smith Willard, which debuted at Palmer's Theatre in February 1891 and played for just over a month.

The cast included Willard playing the dual roles of John Needham and Joseph Norbury, Marie Burroughs as Kate Norbury, Burr McIntosh as Col. Calhoun Booker, and Royce Carleton as Mr. Grant.

=== Cast ===
- Joseph Norbury/John Needham ... Edward Smith Willard
- Richard Woodville ... E.W. Gardiner
- Mr. Horace West ... Charles Harbury
- Mr. Grant ... Royce Carleton
- Mr. Nolan ... Sant Matthews
- Col. Calhoun Booker ... Burr McIntosh
- Percy Tallant ... Bessie Hatton (daughter of Joseph Hatton)
- Thomas ... Harry Cane
- Sanders ... Lysander Thompson
- Kate Norbury ... Marie Burroughs
- Miss Dorothy Norbury ... Cecile Rush
- Mrs. Needham ... Katherine Rogers
- Miss Virginia Fleetwood ... Maxine Elliott
- Hannah ... Cora Edsall

== Silent film ==
A silent film version directed by Lois Weber premiered in April 1916, starring Tyrone Power, Agnes Emerson, and Frank Elliott.The screenplay was by Olga Printzlau.

=== Cast ===
- John Needham/Joseph Norbury ... Tyrone Power
- Ellen Norbury ... Marie Walcamp
- Parks ...Frank Elliott
- Aunt Kate ... Agnes Emerson
- Dobbins ... Walter Belasco
- Cruet ... Frank Lanning
- Thomas Creighton ... Buster Emmons
- Maid ... Mary MacLaren (uncredited)
