= The Rajah (play) =

Play by William Young

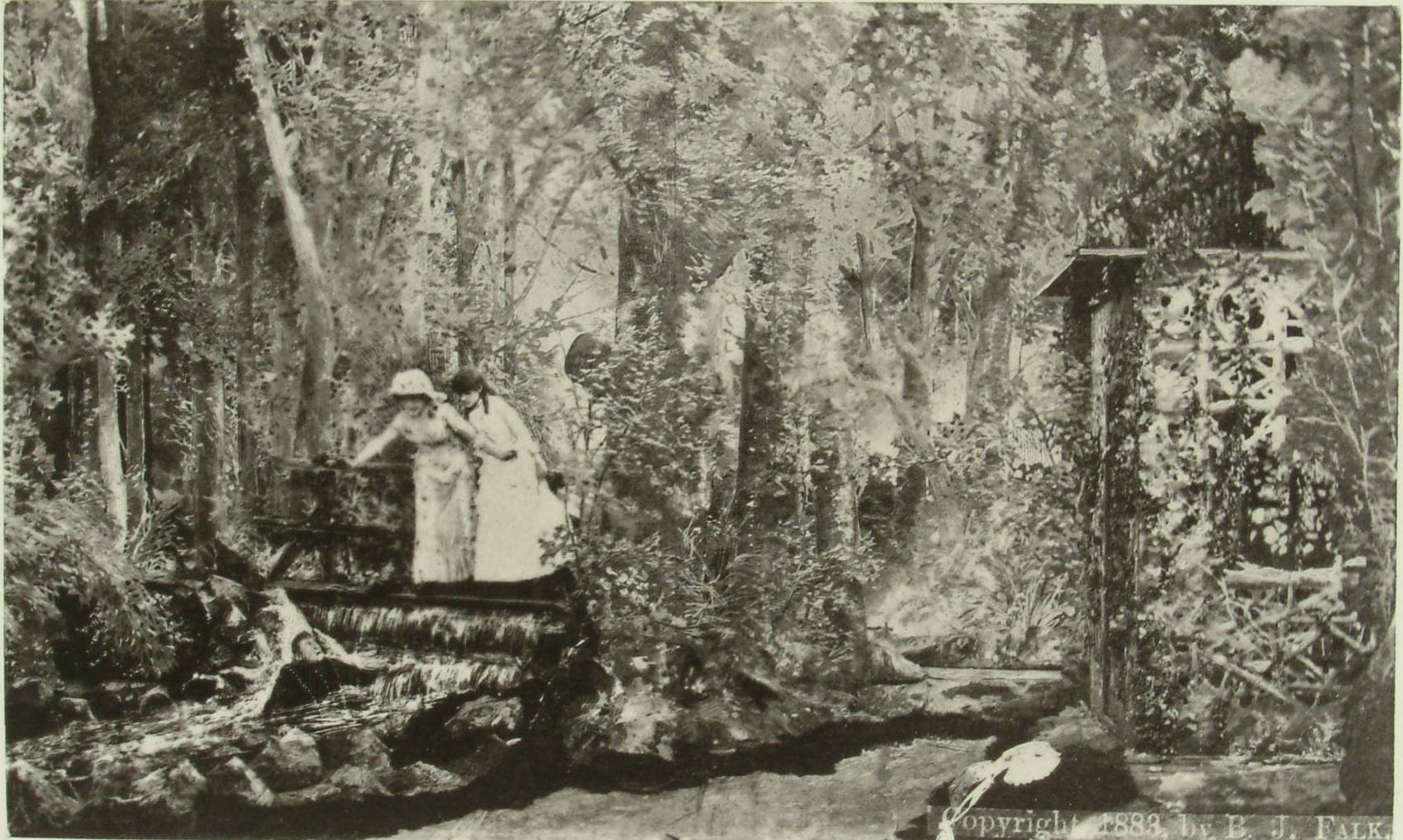
- Actresses Rillie Deaves and Marion Elmore watch Alfred Klein fall into the brook in Act 3 of The Rajah (1883)
- Original language: English
- Written by: William Young
- Genre: Romantic comedy

Premiere
- Date: June 5, 1883
- Place: Madison Square Theatre

The Rajah; or Wyncot's Ward is a play by William Young which debuted at the Madison Square Theatre in New York on June 5, 1883.

The play is a romantic comedy where a hapless man becomes the guardian of his uncle's adopted daughter, and eventually wins her love. Produced by Daniel Frohman at the Madison Square Theatre, it was panned by critics but had a successful run of 256 nights, before also being successful on the road. The play was Young's greatest success as a playwright; his other major success was the play adaptation of Ben Hur in 1899.

== Photographs ==
The Rajah was one of the earliest plays of which successful photographs were taken. Photographer Benjamin Falk took eight pictures, which were made available for sale. For the 100th performance of the play on September 11, 1883, a souvenir with all eight images was created. Among the set are photographs of the much-praised woodland scenery created by John Mazzanovich.

== Opening cast ==
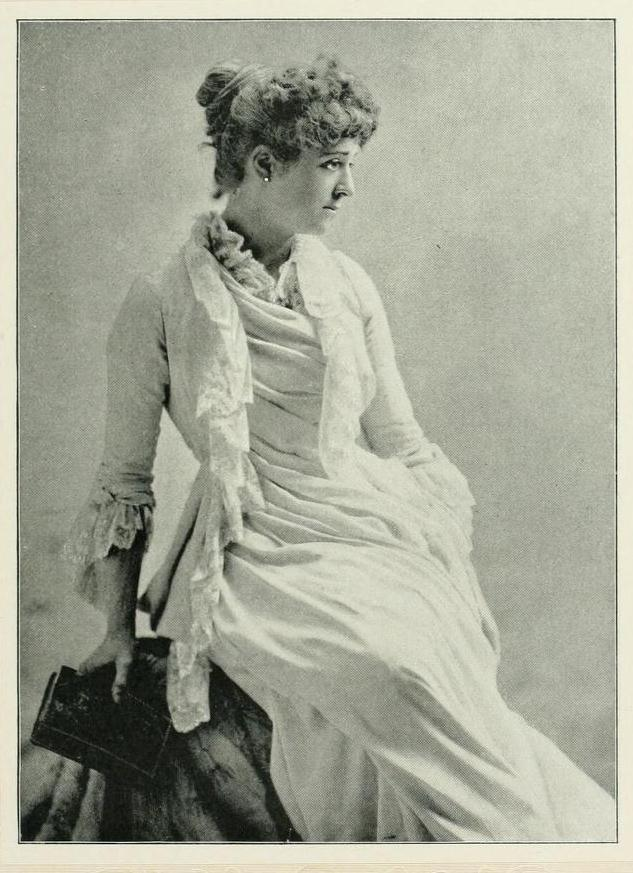
Actress Marie Burroughs as Gladys; she took over the role on Broadway in 1884

- Harold Wyncot (the Rajah) ... George Clarke
- Gladys Wyncot ... Rillie Deaves (also later played by Marie Burroughs)
- Joseph Jeckyll ... William J. Le Moyne
- Emilia Jeckyll ... Enid Leslie (also later played by Marion Elmore)
- Richard Jocelyn ... Thomas Whiffen
- Mr. Jon ... Joseph Frankau
- Mrs. Pringle ... Blanche Whiffen
- Buttons ... Alfred Klein (Klein had to fall into a "brook" of water in the third act)
- Cragin ... Max Freeman

== Adaptations ==
The Rajah was adapted to film at least once; an Edison one reel production with Marc McDermott playing the title role was released on February 14, 1911.
