= Willis Steell =

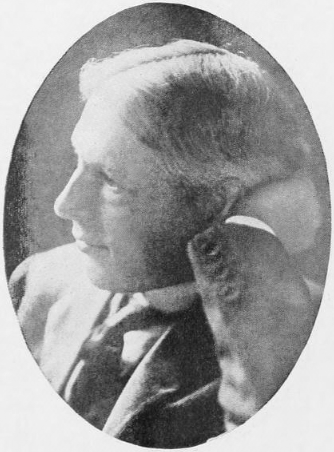
- Born: 1866; Detroit, Michigan, US
- Died: January 31, 1941 (aged 74–75); New York, New York, US
- Occupation: Writer

Willis Steell (1866–1941) was an American journalist, poet, dramatist, novelist and translator.

== Journalism ==
Willis Steell was born in Detroit. He seems to have begun his literary career in New York as a journalist on the New York Tribune from 1887 to 1888, and soon became the New York correspondent for the Albany Press, St. Paul Dispatch, Chicago Times, and Nashville American, and soon was head of a syndicate of Southern papers.

In the 1920s he was the Paris correspondent of the New York Herald, at which time he interviewed Gertrude Stein in 1924 after she published her long gestated novel The Making of Americans. The reason he moved to Paris was to be near his daughter Susan Steell (born 1906), who had won the first scholarship for American girls to study singing in Paris with the French mezzo-soprano Blanche Marchesi that had been established in 1923 by the opera singer Marie Jeritza. Her father commissioned a portrait of her about 1923 from the Swiss-born American artist Adolfo Müller-Ury, which was exhibited in 1925 and of which American Art News, April 11, 1925, said that it "...shows Mr. Ury at his most discerning." Susan (often later called Suzanne) was to enter Broadway, and became one of the close friends of Katharine Hepburn at the time of her first Hollywood success. Susan died in 1959 at 53.

== First published novel ==
His first novel was the well-received Isidra: The Patriot Daughter of Mexico – a Mexican story of the French intervention (1888) which was compared with some of the work of Bret Harte (1836–1902).

== Literary career ==
By 1898, he had written, amongst a mass of journalism by this time, a number of fictional and dramatic works: The Morning after the Play: A Comedy in One Act (1889), Mortal Lips (1890) a story of contemporary life in Harlem, In Seville, & Three Toledo Days – a series of Spanish sketches (1894), and The Fifth Commandment A Play in One Act (1898). He had also written poetry, and a long poem about Christopher Columbus called The Death of The Discoverer appeared in book form in Philadelphia in 1892.

In 1909 he published Walt Whitman's Early Life on Long Island. In March and April 1914 he held a series of "Conferences" at the Waldorf Hotel in New York on Prosper Mérimée, Guy de Maupassant, and Maurice Maeterlinck.

In 1924 Steell translated Jérôme Tharaud and Jean Tharaud's Long Walk of Samba Diouf, an important piece of literature on negro culture, and in 1928 published a biography Benjamin Franklin of Paris 1776-1785.

Steell died in New York City on January 31, 1941.

== Dramatist ==
Typical of Steell's work was his liking for one-act dramas, a good example of which was A Juliet of the People produced at the Madison Square Theatre 1901, and which reviewed in the New York Times, January 20, 1900:

A Juliet of the People, a one-act drama by Willis Steell, setting forth in simple and natural action and with a touch of poetical feeling, the incidents of a tragedy in humble life, much in the manner of the stories of the operas of the latest Italian school, had a trial performance last week at an exhibition matinée of a school of acting. Some of them abide in the ruined home of the Capulets, transformed by the cruel irony of fate and time, into a tenement for the poor. A Juliet loves a Romeo and a jealous rival slays him. Mr Steell has not been heard from hitherto as a playwright, though othervplays are spoken of now as theatrical possibilities of the future.

Along with Edward E. Rose, he wrote another play - completed August/September 1900 - The Battle of the Strong based on the novel by Gilbert Parker, which was produced by Daniel V. Arthur in Chicago in the autumn of 1900, and transferred to New York in January 1901, with Marie Burroughs in the principal role. With Clyde Fitch (1865–1909) he dramatized a novel by Alfred Henry Lewis called Wolfville: A Drama of The South West in October 1905 at the Broad Street Theatre in Philadelphia.

== Contemporary assessment ==
Three letters were published in the New York Times on April 2, 5, and 16, 1898, in answer to a correspondent's enquiry as to who this writer was. In that of April 5, a correspondent identified only by the initials J. J. E. wrote of Steell,

His work is forceful and original in prose, while such verse by him as I have seen impressed me like genuine poetry. Mr Steel is a newspaper man and a successful one, for I think we all have to admit that the newspapers swallow up a great deal of our best talent – at least for a time.

== Works ==
- Isidra: The Patriot Daughter of Mexico (1888)
- The Morning After the Play: A Comedy in One Act (1889) W.H. Baker & Company, Boston
- Mortal Lips (1890)
- The Death of the Discoverer (1892) H. Murray, New York
- In Seville, & Three Toledo days (1894) Hillier Murray and Co., New York
- The Firm of Cunningham (1905)
- The Fifth Commandment: A Play in One Act (1907) W.H. Baker & Company, Boston
- Brother Dave: A Play in One Act (1909) W.H. Baker & Company, Boston
- The Prospector: A Comedy in Three Acts (1912)
- A Bride from Home: A Vaudeville Sketch in One Act (1912)
- Faro Nell: A Vaudeville Sketch in One Act (1912)
- Sniping: A Drama in One Act (1915)
- A Mountain of Gold
- Anna: A Play
- A Prince of Lorraine: Drama in Five Acts
