= William Treloar =

William Treloar may refer to:

- William M. Treloar (1850–1935), American music professor, composer, and U.S. Congressman
- Sir William Treloar, 1st Baronet (1843–1923), Lord Mayor of London in 1906
- A character in the 1966 British children's book, The Richleighs of Tantamount
