= George Clarke (actor) =

American actor

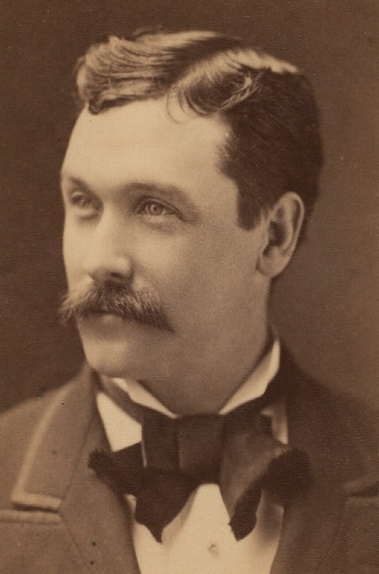
- Born: George O'Neill; June 28, 1840; Brooklyn, New York, U.S.
- Died: October 3, 1906 (aged 66) near Norfolk, Connecticut, U.S.
- Occupation: Stage actor
- Years active: 1855–1906
- Known for: Shakespearean roles; association with Augustin Daly

George Clarke (born George O'Neill; 28 June 1840 - 3 October 1906) was an American stage actor with a career spanning five decades from the mid-1850s to 1906 (the year of his death). He was best known for his Shakespearean roles and plays of the Romantic era. Clarke was closely associated with Augustin Daly during two phases of his career. He joined Daly's company in 1869 when he established a reputation in leading roles, but left in 1874 after a disagreement between the two men. He joined with Daly again in 1887 and remained with the company, regularly performing in productions in New York and London, until Daly's death in 1899.

== Biography ==
=== Early years ===
George O'Neill was born on 28 June 1840 in Brooklyn, New York. His parents were Irish emigrants from county Kildare in Ireland.^{[A]}

George's family moved to Richmond, Virginia, where he attended a school run by the Christian Brothers. His parents were strict Roman Catholics and wished for their son to be educated for the priesthood. George first attended a theatre when he was aged thirteen or fourteen, and found himself captivated by the experience. As he later explained: "It excited or aroused my particular Roman Catholic hysterical temperament into a condition that was very willing to accept any outlet; and as the theatre seemed the nearest thing to the pageantry of the church, I was at once attracted to the stage".

In September 1855 George joined the Richmond Dramatic Association and played "many youthful parts", including the role of 'Prince of Wales' in Shakespeare's Richard III.

In about 1857, when he was aged seventeen, George joined a theatrical ensemble called Hight & Hyde's Dramatic Company, then touring the American South. He toured with them and also a company managed by George Kunkel and John T. Ford, at some stage adopting the stage-name of George Clarke. He then became attached to the Holliday Street Theatre in Baltimore, under the John T. Ford's management, where he remained until mid-year 1859.

=== Theatre experience ===
Late in 1859 Clarke accepted a position with P. T. Barnum at the Barnum Museum on the corner of Broadway and Ann Street in New York, where he remained for three years playing a variety of small parts.

By 1863 Clarke was a member of Mrs. John Wood's Company at the Olympic Theatre in New York, during which time he performed in Taming the Butterfly, an early play by Augustin Daly. He later performed at the Boston Theatre under the management of Orlande Tompkins, Benjamin W. Thayer and Henry C. Jarrett.

After a brief season with Leonard Grover at the New Chestnut Street Theatre in Philadelphia, Clarke joined Mark Smith and John Lewis Baker at the New York Theatre, where he played 'Bob Brierly' in The Ticket-of-Leave Man. In mid-year 1867 Clarke rejoined Grover at New York's Olympic Theatre and also supported Lucille Western at the Walnut Street Theatre in Philadelphia, as well as performing at the Worrell Sisters' New York Theatre in the plays Norwood and Under the Gaslight, written by Augustin Daly.

In mid-year 1868 Clarke was engaged by Edwin Forrest as a stage manager and "occasional leading man". By this stage in his career, after his decade-long acting experience and aged in his late-twenties, Clarke was described as "a handsome youth, beginning to win favour".

=== The Daly Company ===
In 1869 Clarke joined the Augustin Daly Company at Daly's Theatre in Twenty-fourth Street, New York, being managed by the playwright and theatre critic Augustin Daly. Clarke performed there as 'Charles Courtly' in London Assurance and 'Littleton Coke' in Old Heads and Young Hearts. In 1870 Clarke reprised those parts at Wallack's Theatre. He remained there for only part of the season, leaving to become manager of Lina Edwin's Theatre, opposite the New York Hotel. In about September 1871 Clarke joined William J. Florence's company for his production of Eileen Oge at the Grand Opera House in New York and finished the season at the Varieties Theatre in New Orleans.

In September 1872 Clarke returned to the company at Daly's Theatre in New York, playing alongside Clara Morris in Diamonds. During 1872 Clarke played the following roles: 'Flutter' in The Belle's Strategem, 'Goldfinch' in The Road to Ruin, 'Mirabel' in The Inconstant, 'Ford' in The Merry Wives of Windsor, 'Charles Surface' in Sheridan's The School for Scandal and 'Julio' in A Bold Stroke for a Husband. In 1873 he and Clara Morris appeared together in productions of Alixe and Divorce. On 1 January 1974 Clarke performed at the matinee as 'Lord Arthur Chilton' in a production of New Year's Eve. A few hours after the performance had ended the theatre was destroyed by fire. Clarke remained with Daly during the five month season from mid-January 1873, at his temporary theatre opposite the New York Hotel.

A new production of The School for Scandal opened on 9 September 1874 at Daly's Fifth Avenue Theatre, with Clarke performing the role of 'Charles Surface'. The School for Scandal was followed by Moorcroft on 18 October, a new play written by Bronson Howard for Daly's company, in which Clarke played the role of 'Harrington Gawtry'. However, the reviews of Howard's play were scathing, gaining "the unanimous condemnation of the critics". The reviewer for the New York Tribune wrote: "A sillier play than 'Moorcroft' it has never been our misfortune to witness". The final performance of Moorcroft was held on the evening of 31 October. After the failure of Moorcroft, Daly decided to revive The School for Scandal for two nights, beginning on 2 November.

It had been the custom in all first-class theatres that male actors in older comedies (such as The School for Scandal) should "wear no hair upon the face, so as to accord with the fashion of the period" (unless specifically required to do otherwise). Daly was a strong advocate of the custom, which he adopted as an iron-clad rule for his productions, and a notice detailing the instruction was posted in the green-room of the theatre. Clarke had grown a moustache for his part in Moorcroft and chose to disregard the directive for a play running for only two nights. On the evening of the opening of The School for Scandal Daly severely reprimanded Clarke for his refusal to follow instructions, which ended with Clarke refusing to appear on stage, telling Daly "that he might read the part himself" before leaving the theatre. Clarke inflamed the situation by allowing himself to be interviewed by newspaper reporters, in which he criticised Daly and "predicted his early downfall". A few months afterwards Clarke wrote a letter to Daly expressing his regret about the incident, but twelve years was to elapse before the actor once again worked for Daly. After Clarke's departure from Daly's company John Drew Jnr. joined in his place.^{[B]}

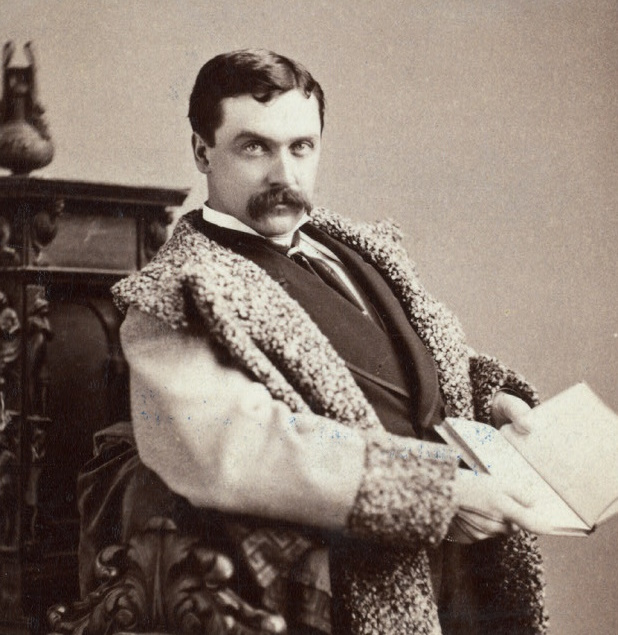
George Clarke (1840-1906).

=== Interregnum ===
After leaving Daly's company Clarke supported Clara Rousby at the Fourteenth Street Theatre and subsequent touring production (under the management of J. Grau and C. A. Chizzola). In 1875 he travelled to England where he played in Proof Positive at the London Opera Comique and he performed in a provincial tour of The Shaughraun. He was also a cast member with Charles Wyndham in the first production of The Pink Dominos. In 1878, after returning to New York, Clarke produced Hearts of Steel at Niblo's Garden. In 1879 he performed in Rescued, under the management of Dion Boucicault at Booth's Theatre, which suffered from poor attendances.

Clarke taught acting for the stage for a short period. During the period 1877 to 1883 he was engaged in various tours "with doubtful pieces and odd companies, and in brief engagements with numberless managers and theatres". Clarke supported Fanny Davenport and Clara Morris during their tours and occasionally performed at the Star and Madison Square theatres in New York.

From June 1883 Clarke played the lead role of 'Harold Wyncot' in the first production of The Rajah at the Madison Square Theatre. Although the romantic comedy was panned by the critics, it was a popular success and ran for 250 nights in New York. In May 1884 he played 'Inspector Byrnes' in The Pulse of New York at the Star Theatre.

=== Back with Daly's company ===
Clarke was managed by Lester Wallack during the 1885-86 season after which he returned to Augustin Daly's Company, first performing in The Taming of the Shrew on 18 January 1887. He remained with Daly's company for the next thirteen years (until Daly's death in 1899).

Clarke alternated between New York and London while working for Daly during the period 1887 to 1899, frequently playing roles in Shakespearean productions as well as other plays, including revivals of older productions such as The School for Scandal and London Assurance. He acted in many productions alongside the popular actress Ada Rehan. Clarke's acting skills were "well received in Daly's numerous Shakespearean revivals". Examples of his roles in Shakespeare plays were: "a swaggering and cringing Malvolio in Twelfth Night; a romantic Orlando in As You Like It; an impressive Leonato in Much Ado About Nothing; a gay, clever Biron in Love's Labour's Lost". He also played the role of 'Jaques' in As You Like It, 'Petruchio' in The Taming of the Shrew, the 'Duke of Milan' in The Two Gentlemen of Verona and 'Theseus' in A Midsummer Night's Dream.

In 1888 Clarke travelled to London where he performed at the Gaiety Theatre in The Railroad of Love (as 'Grinnidge') and The Taming of the Shrew. In October 1888 he played in The Lottery of Love in Daly's Theatre, New York.

In New York in January 1889 Clarke played 'Captain Duretête' in The Inconstant. In March he performed in The Taming of the Shrew and Samson and Dalilah. In London Clarke played 'Joseph Surface' in The School for Scandal, followed by 'Biron' in Love's Labour's Lost. In December in New York hHe played 'Jaques' in a revival of As You Like It.

In New York in February and March 1890 Clarke performed in the plays Country Girl, Le Pater (The Prayer), A Midsummer Night's Dream and Haroun al Raschid. Later that year, at the Lyceum Theatre in London, Clarke played 'Hollyhock' in Casting the Boomerang, followed by 'Jaques' in As You Like It and the young husband in A Woman's Won't.

In early 1891 in New York Clarke performed in The School for Scandal and Love's Labour's Lost. In 1891 at London's Lyceum Theatre he played the secretary in The Last Word. From September to December 1891 Clarke appeared in As You like It and The Taming of the Shrew in New York.

In February 1892 Clarke performed in Love in Tandem in New York. From March 1892 he played the role of 'King Richard, Cœur de Lion' in the first production of Tennyson's The Foresters at Daly's Theatre. In October he appeared in Little Miss Million and Dollars and Sense. In November 1892 he performed in A Test Case, followed by The Hunchback (in the role of 'Master Walter').

In 1893 and 1894 Clarke performed in revivals of previous productions in both New York and London. During 1895, in addition to revivals of previous plays, Clarke played roles in the following productions in New York: Queen of Smiles, The Critic, A Bundle of Lies, The Honeymoon and The Transit of Leo. From the mid- to late-1890s George Clarke continued to perform in both New York and London, mostly in Shakespeare's plays and revivals of previous productions.

=== Last years ===
Clarke "had an excellent voice and graceful manner, and in his earlier days was regarded as very handsome". At the time of his death it was said that he "belonged to the old school" of acting. Clarke was described by the theatre critic John R. Towse as a "versatile and well-trained actor, expert in all the tricks of his trade, intelligent, but without a particle of inspiration".

In Clarke's last professional theatrical appearance, he was cast as 'Senator Bender' of Oregon in the comedy The Embassy Ball, a production by Daniel Frohman (with Lawrence D'Orsay in the lead role). The play opened in Providence, Rhode Island, in January 1906, after which it played in New York in Daly's Theatre from 5 March to 16 April 1906.

George Clarke died on 3 October 1906 "at his country residence" near Norfolk, Connecticut, aged 66.

== Notes ==
A.George O'Neill's father served for thirty-five years in the American Navy and died from wounds received when fighting in the Civil War.

B.In response to the dispute between Clarke and Daly, H. C. Bunner wrote a poem titled 'The Rape of the Moustache', published anonymously in The Arcadian on 19 November 1874. The poem was a verbal parody of Thomas Gray's 'The Bard'.
