= William Young (playwright) =

American dramatist

- Born: 7 September 1847; Monmouth, Illinois, United States
- Died: 2 October 1920 (aged 73); Burkhaven, Lake Sunapee, New Hampshire
- Resting place: Monmouth, Illinois
- Education: Monmouth College
- Occupations: Playwright, poet, actor
- Known for: Play adaptation of the novel Ben-Hur in 1899
- Spouse: Arvilla Joan Parry (m. 1866)

William Wallace Young (7 September 1847 – 2 October 1920) was an American playwright, writer, and actor, best known for his play adaptation of the novel Ben-Hur in 1899.

Young was born in Monmouth, Illinois, on 7 September 1845, the son of Dr. John A. Young and Isabella Hogue Wallace. He was valedictorian and last surviving member of Monmouth College class of 1863, and married Arvilla Joan Parry there in 1866. He was still at home with his parents in the 1870 census of Monmouth, with "literature" listed as his occupation. He was shown as a playwright with his wife and two children in the 1880 census of Monmouth, Illinois; his obituary stated he left Monmouth 30 years prior to his death (circa 1890), but always considered it his home.

His first play, Jonquil, opened at Booth's Theatre in New York in 1871. His first play to receive significant attention was Pendragon in 1881. His 1883 comedy The Rajah was panned by critics but commercially successful, playing for 256 shows in New York before going on the road.

He also acted some roles, and published a number of poems, including a volume titled Wishmaker's Town in 1885 which was republished in 1898 with an introduction by Thomas Bailey Aldrich.

Young died at his summer residence, Burkhaven, Lake Sunapee, New Hampshire, on 2 October 1920, and was buried in Monmouth, Illinois, on 10 October 1920. Knowing that his time was short, he had just finished a historical play prior to his death (title unknown), asking that his daughter Nina transcribe it and ready it for publication.

== Selected works ==
- Jonquil (1871)
- Pendragon (1881) (featuring actor Lawrence Barrett on Broadway)
- The Rajah (1883)
- Wishmaker's Town (poems) (1885)
- Ganelon (1889) (featuring actor Lawrence Barrett on Broadway)
- Joan of Arc (1890) (adaptation of Jules Barbier)
- If I Were You (1892)
- Ben-Hur (adaptation of novel) (1899)
- A Chinese Nightingale (1903) (from Winnifred Eaton novel)
