= Barbara Willard =

British novelist (1909–1994)

- Born: 12 March 1909; Brighton, England
- Died: 18 February 1994 (aged 84); Wivelsfield, England
- Occupation: novelist
- Relatives: Edmund Willard (father); E. S. Willard (great-uncle)
- Writing career
- Notable work: The Richleighs of Tantamount (1966)
- Notable awards: Guardian Children's Fiction Prize (1973)

Barbara Mary Willard (12 March 1909 – 18 February 1994) was a British novelist best known for children's historical fiction. Her "Mantlemass Chronicles" is a family saga set in 15th to 17th-century England. For one chronicle, The Iron Lily (1973), she won the annual Guardian Children's Fiction Prize, a book award judged by panel of British children's writers.

== Life ==
Willard was born in Brighton, Sussex on 12 March 1909, the daughter of the Shakespearean actor Edmund Willard and Mabel Theresa Tebbs. She was also the great-niece of Victorian-era actor Edward Smith Willard. The young Willard was educated at a convent school in Southampton.

Because of her family connections, Willard originally went on the stage as an actress and also worked as a playreader, but she was unsuccessful and abandoned acting in her early twenties. She wrote numerous books for adults before she turned to children's literature.

Very little about the author was written during her lifetime, because of her private nature. She died at a nursing home in Wivelsfield Green, East Sussex, on 18 February 1994.

== Writing career ==
The Grove of Green Holly (1967), which was a story about a group of 17th century travelling players who were hiding in a forest in Sussex from Oliver Cromwell's soldiers, spawned her most famous work, the Mantlemass series (1970–1981) including her Guardian Prize-winning book. Some other books were Hetty (1956), Storm from the West (1963), Three and One to Carry (1964), and Charity at Home (1965).

One of her last books, The Forest - Ashdown in East Sussex, published by Sweethaws Press in 1989, gives a detailed account of Ashdown Forest. In the introduction to the book, Christopher Robin Milne notes that Willard had moved from her home on the Sussex Downs to the edge of Ashdown Forest in 1956 and that her new surroundings had provided the inspiration and setting for ten of her children's historical novels (eight in the Mantlemass series and two others). It is evident by her own account in her book that she actively involved herself in the affairs of the forest. She was a representative of the forest Commoners elected to the forest's Board of Conservators in 1975, and she remained in that capacity for ten years. She tells how she was later heavily involved in the fundraising campaign which enabled East Sussex County Council to purchase the forest in 1988, enabling it to remain as a place of beauty and tranquility open to the public.

== List of selected works ==
=== Children's fiction ===
Mantlemass Chronicles

1. The Miller's Boy, 1976

.

1. The Lark and the Laurel, 1970
2. The Sprig of Broom, 1971
3. A Cold Wind Blowing, 1972
4. The Eldest Son, 1977
5. The Iron Lily, 1973
6. A Flight of Swans, 1980
7. Harrow and Harvest, 1974
8. The Keys of Mantlemass, 1981 (a series of short stories that form bridges between the full-length books)

=== Adult fiction ===
- Love in Ambush, 1930 (with Elizabeth Helen Devas)
- Ballerina, 1932
- As Far as in me Lies, 1936
- The Dogs Do Bark, 1948
- Portrait of Philip, 1950
- Celia Scarfe, 1951

Other children's fiction

- Hetty, 1956
- Snail and the Pennithornes, 1957
- The Penny Pony, 1961
- Duck on a Pond, 1962
- Storm from the West, 1963
- The Battle of Wednesday Week, 1963
- Three and One to Carry, 1964
- A Dog and a Half, 1964
- Charity at Home, 1965
- Surprise Island, 1966
- The Richleighs of Tantamount, 1966
- The Grove of Green Holly, 1967
- "The Family Tower", 1968
- "The Toppling Towers", 1969
- The Gardener's Grandchildren, 1978
- Spell Me A Witch, 1979
- Summer Season, 1981
