= The Foresters =

Play by Alfred Tennyson with music by Arthur Sullivan

Programme for London production, 1893

The Foresters or, Robin Hood and Maid Marian is a play written by Alfred Tennyson and first produced with success in New York in 1892. A set of incidental music in nine movements was composed for the play by Arthur Sullivan.

The success of the first production led to productions in seven other American cities. A production opened in London in 1893. Although the play was not well received in England, Sullivan's incidental music was praised.

== The play ==
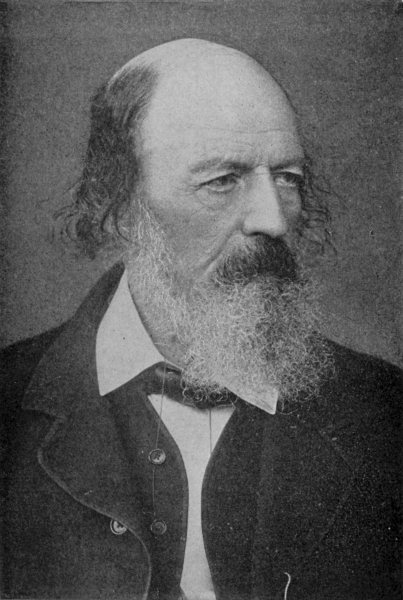
Alfred Tennyson

Sullivan and Tennyson had worked together before, on a song cycle for tenor, The Window, written and composed in 1867–68, but not published until 1871. Sullivan and Tennyson did not find working together on The Window congenial and did not attempt work together again for over twenty years. Meanwhile, Tennyson had written a play, The Cup, that was produced with success by Henry Irving at the Lyceum Theatre in 1881. Encouraged by this, Tennyson started work on a play based on the Robin Hood legend, completing it after a visit to Sherwood Forest in October 1881. But Irving rejected the play on the grounds that it was not dramatic enough for his audiences at the Lyceum, who were accustomed to his sensational productions. Tennyson turned to other projects, setting The Foresters aside for several years. In 1888, American actress Mary Anderson decided to produce The Cup. Tennyson suggested that she also produce The Foresters, but again the play was set aside. In 1891, however, Anderson's brother, Joseph wrote to the American impresario Augustin Daly recommending that The Foresters would be a good project for him and his star actress Ada Rehan. Daly was enthusiastic about the play and, by September 1891, agreed to arrange a New York production. By then, Tennyson was 82 years old.

The text, consisting of a mixture of blank verse and prose, contained songs and dances which Daly, at Tennyson's suggestion, approached Sullivan to compose. Daly made numerous changes to Tennyson's text, cutting dialogue, moving events from one act to another, and reassigning songs and dialogue to different characters. Henry Widmer, Daly's musical assistant, may have contributed some music to the score. Sullivan completed the score by December 1891, and the play opened in New York on 17 March 1892. The piece starred Rehan as Marian and John Drew Jr. as Robin. It was a hit and was then played in seven other major American cities, becoming Tennyson's greatest theatrical success. A single performance of the play was given at the Lyceum Theatre in London on the same day as the first New York performance to secure the British copyright.

An English production opened at the new Daly's Theatre, in London, on 3 October 1893, by which time the author had died. It starred Rehan and Arthur Bourchier. Despite the respect in which Lord Tennyson was held, the play received poor notices in London, being called "tedious" and compared with a nursery tale, and ran for only seventeen performances. Sullivan's music, by contrast, was initially well reviewed. The Illustrated Sporting and Dramatic News, for example, wrote that the songs were "set with rare taste, discrimination and melody by Sir Arthur Sullivan, whose delightful music gives charm and interest".

Sullivan's biographers and scholars of his work have been unanimous in censuring Tennyson's text. Gervase Hughes wrote, "How did the author of The Idylls of the King come to put his name to such puerile rubbish?" Arthur Jacobs called the piece "perhaps the oddest of all the stage works which [Sullivan] was invited to undertake." Percy Young scoffed, "Devoid of any kind of merit whatsoever." But some of them did not warmly review Sullivan's score either: "One of Sullivan's lamest... resourceless in magic" (Young); "[not] even one memorable number" (Jacobs). Recent critics, however, have praised Sullivan's contribution.

== Roles and original cast ==
Cast list of 1893 London production

Original New York cast shown, with changes in London cast noted. Vocal ranges noted for roles that sing parts in the incidental music:

- King Richard, Coeur de Lion – George Clarke
- Prince John – John Craig
- Robin Hood, Earl of Huntingdon – John Drew, Jr. (Arthur Bourchier in London)
- Sir Richard Lea – Charles Wheatleigh (Henry Loraine in London)
- The Abbot of St. Mary's – Thomas Bridgeland (Lloyd Lowndes in London)
- The Sheriff of Nottingham – Charles LeClercq
- A Justiciary – William Gilbert
- Walter Lea, Son of Sir Richard Lea – Ralph Nisbet (Robb Harwood in London)
- Followers of Robin Hood:

Little John – Herbert Gresham
Friar Tuck – Eugene Jepson (William Owen in London)
Will Scarlet (tenor) – Hobart Bosworth
Old Much – Tyrone Power (Sidney Herbert in London)

- Maid Marian, Daughter of Sir Richard Lea (mezzo-soprano) – Ada Rehan
- Kate, Attendant on Marian (soprano) – Kitty Cheatham (Catherine Lewis in London)
- Titania (soprano) – Percy Haswell
- First Fairy (soprano) – Miss Massoni (Gaston Murray in London)
- Retainers, Messengers, Merry Men, Mercenaries, Friars, Beggars, Sailors, Peasants, etc.

== Musical numbers ==
The nine musical numbers, with the opening lines of text for each, are as follows:

Act I ('The Bond' )

- Song sung by Kate, attendant to Maid Marian

The warrior Earl of Allendale,
He loved the Lady Anne;
The lady loved the master well,
The maid she loved the man.

- Song sung by Maid Marian

Love flew in at the window,
As Wealth walk'd in at the door.
'You have come for you saw Wealth coming,' said I.
But he flutter'd his wings with a sweet little cry,
'I'll cleave to you rich or poor.'

- Chorus (drinking song)

Long live Richard,
Robin and Richard!
Long live Richard!
Down with John!
Drink to the Lion-heart
Every-one!

- Chorus [originally a solo for Robin Hood]

To sleep! to sleep! The long bright day is done,
And darkness rises from the fallen sun.
To sleep! to sleep!

Act II ('The Flight of Marian')

- Song sung by Will Scarlet [originally a chorus]

There is no land like England,
Where'er the light of day be;
There are no hearts like English hearts,
Such hearts of oak as they be.

- Scene for Titania and fairies

Evil Fairy! do you hear?
So he said who lieth here.
We be fairies of the wood.
We be neither bad nor good.
Back and side and hip and rib,
Nip, nip him for his fib.

Act III ('The Crowning of Marian')

- Song sung by Will Scarlet

By all the deer that spring
Thro' wood and lawn and ling,
When all the leaves are green;
By arrow and gray goosewing

Act IV ('The Conclusion')

- Song sung by Maid Marian

The bee buzz'd up in the heat:
'I am faint for your honey, my sweet.'
The flower said, 'Take, it my dear,
For now is the spring of the year.
So come, come!'
'Hum!'
And the bee buzz'd down from the heat.

- Chorus and dance

Now the King is home again, and nevermore to roam again.
Now the King is home again, the King will have his own again,
Home again, home again, and each will have his own again,
All the birds in merry Sherwood sing and sing him home again.

== Recording ==
A recording was made of the music in 2004 by the New London Orchestra, The London Chorus and soloists conducted by Ronald Corp. It is published on the Hyperion label. The Northamptonshire Theatre Orchestra and A La Carte & Friends performed the piece at the 2008 International Gilbert and Sullivan Festival claiming that theirs was the first live performance with orchestra since the nineteenth century.
