= The Battle of the Strong =

1898 novel by Gilbert Parker

The Battle of the Strong: A Romance of Two Kingdoms
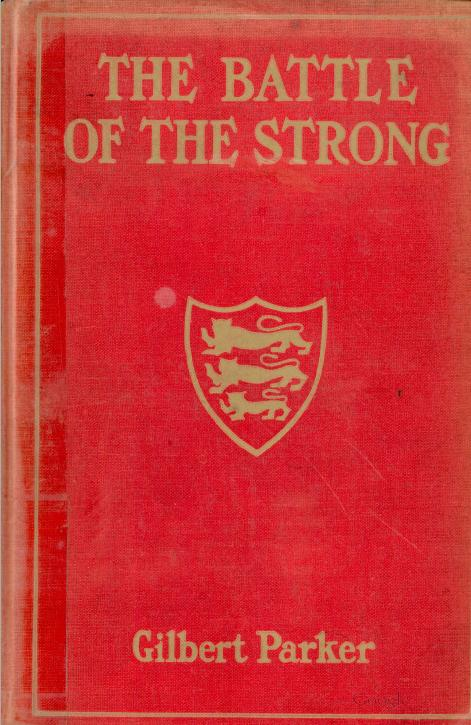
- Author: Gilbert Parker
- Language: English
- Genre: Novel
- Publication date: 1898
- Media type: Print (hardcover)
- Pages: 466 pp

The Battle of the Strong is an 1898 novel by Gilbert Parker. It was first published in serial format in The Atlantic Monthly starting in January 1898, and as a single volume late in the same year. It was ranked as the tenth-highest best selling book overall in the United States for 1898, and appeared as high as Number 2 on the monthly bestseller list published in The Bookman in early 1899. The book is set in the Channel Islands, primarily during the period 1781-95, and opens with attempted invasion of Jersey by France in the Battle of Jersey.

The title is derived from Ecclesiastes 9:11, "the race is not to the swift, nor the battle to the strong."

Willis Steell and Edward Everett Rose adapted the novel into a play in 1900, which starred Maurice Barrymore and Marie Burroughs. Of the play, Parker later remarked that "the adaption, however, was lacking much, and though Miss Marie Burroughs and Maurice Barrymore played in it, success did not attend its dramatic life."
