= Marie Burroughs =

American actress

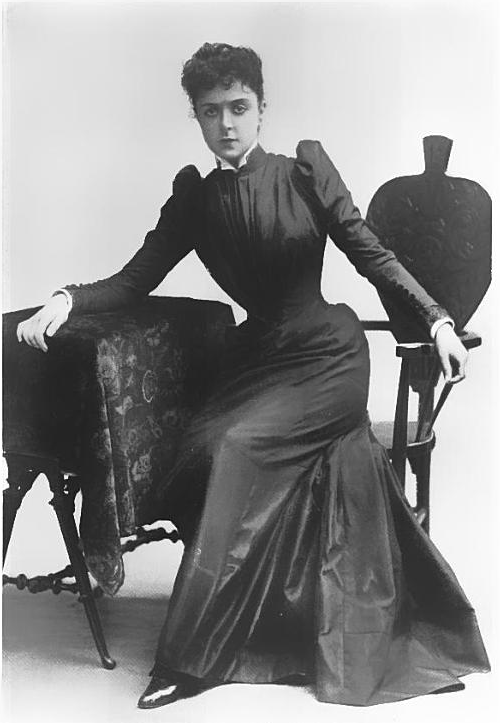
- Marie Burroughs in The Illustrated American (1891), in the role of Mary Blenkarn in The Middleman
- Born: Lillie Arrington; September 26, 1866; San Jose, California
- Died: March 4, 1926 (aged 59); Santa Barbara, California

Marie Burroughs (born Lillie Arrington; September 26, 1866 – March 4, 1926) was an American stage actress in the late 19th century. She played prominent roles in many plays, although she never became a first-tier star.

== Career ==
Burroughs was born in San Jose, California in 1866, and raised in San Francisco. By age 17, her promise as an actor was noted by actor Lawrence Barrett, and earned her an invitation to appear in The Rajah at the Madison Square Theatre in New York.

She made her Broadway debut in 1884 and assumed her stage name. She was an immediate success, but her acting skills were still raw and it was said that her good looks carried her at first. Actor Louis Massen became her acting coach, and soon after her first husband.

She had roles in many plays through the 1880s and 1890s, including in a number of plays supporting English actor Edward Smith Willard. She retired from the stage in 1901.

Writer Willa Cather described Burroughs in 1895 as "not a very great actress, but she is great enough to be allowed to do her best unhindered." Similarly, the Illustrated American said "that she will ever rank among the greatest actresses of the world, not even her most devoted admirers can expect, but she is so painstaking and so devoted to her profession that with each succeeding season she shows some improvement in her art."

In 1894, Burroughs' popularity was such that she was the vehicle for a volume of actor photographs called The Marie Burroughs Art Portfolio of Stage Celebrities, published by A.N. Marquis & Company.

== Personal life ==
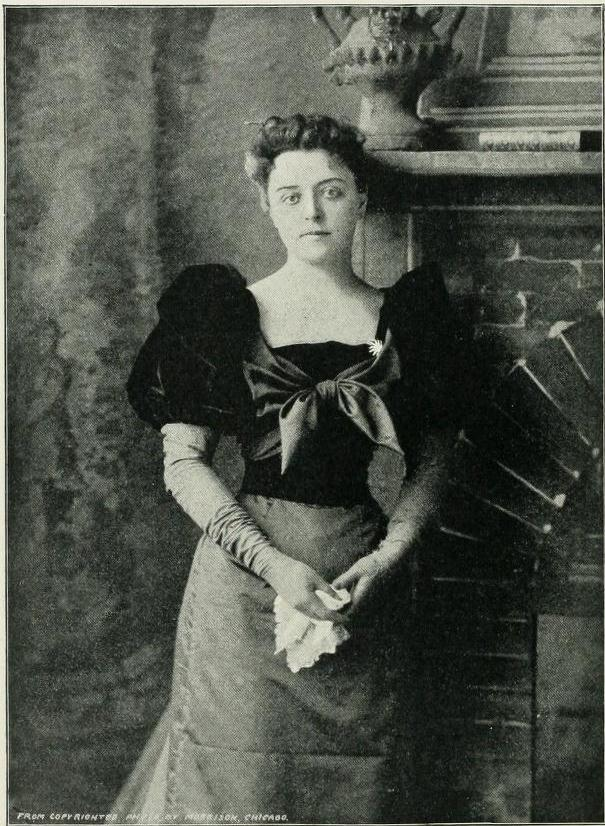
Burroughs c. 1894, photo by W. M. Morrison

As a celebrity of her day, Burroughs' personal life drew public attention. Her first husband, Louis F. Massen, was also her acting instructor who she met in The Rajah; they divorced in 1895. In 1899, her engagement to Dr. Albert E. Sterne was announced, but their planned December 1899 was postponed due to illness on her part, and the engagement later ended. In 1901, she married Robert Barclay Macpherson, who died in 1907. In 1908, she married Francis M. Livingston.

Burroughs died in Santa Barbara, California, on March 4, 1926.

== Selected appearances ==
- The Rajah as Gladys (1884)
- Alpine Roses as Irma (1884)
- Hazel Kirke
- Esmeralda
- After the Ball
- Mrs. Winthrop
- Called Back
- Elaine (1887) as Queen Guinevere
- Saints and Sinners
- The Middleman as Mary Blenkarn
- Judah as Vashti Dethic (supporting Edward Smith Willard)
- Wealth as Edith Ruddock
- John Needham's Double (1891) as Kate Norbury
- The Professor's Love Story as Lucy
- The Profligate
- The Battle of the Strong (1900) as Guida Landresse
