= Corona Riccardo =

Italian-born American actress

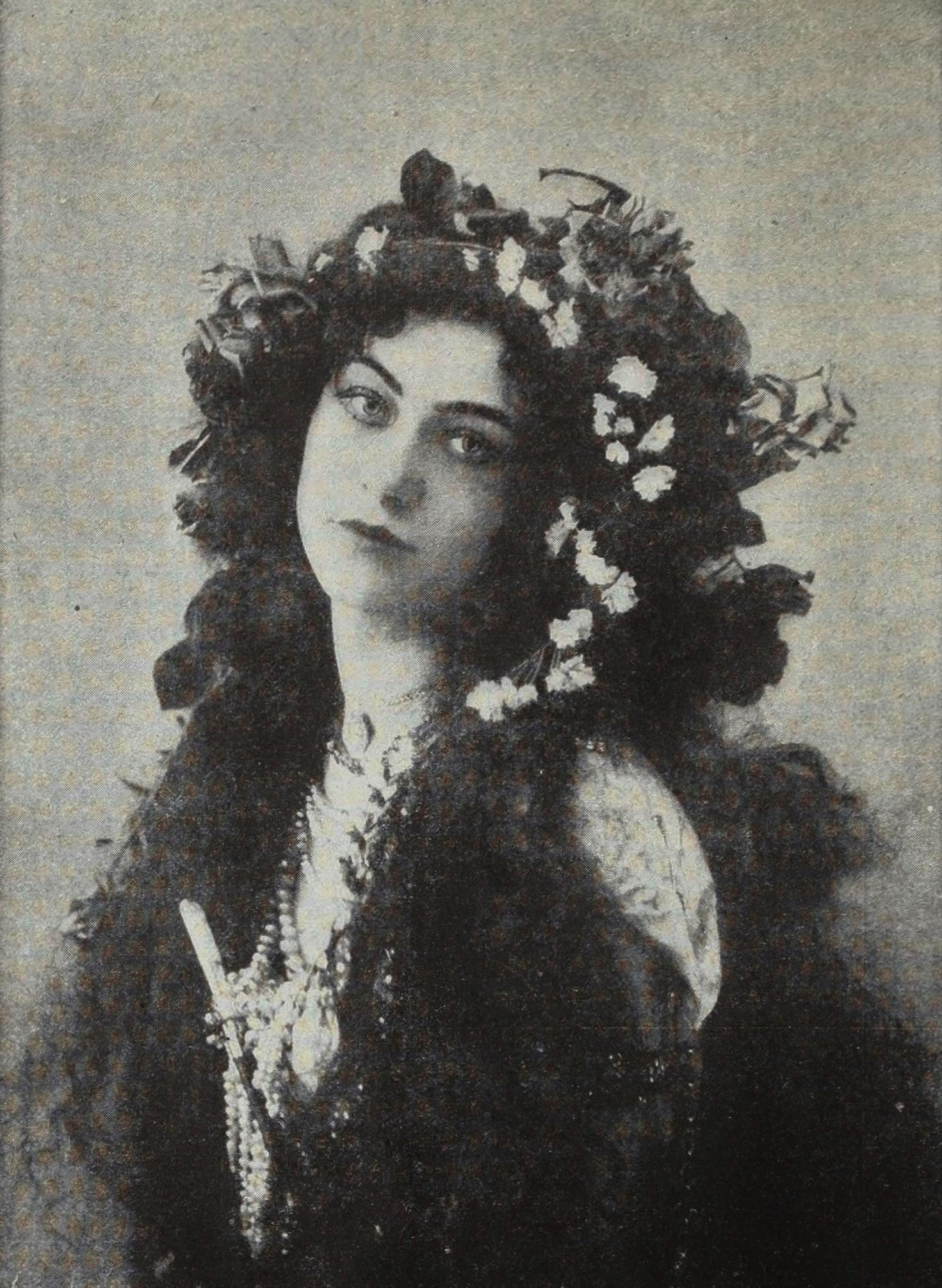
- Born: c. 1878; Naples, Italy
- Died: October 15, 1917; Kansas City, Missouri, US
- Occupation: Actress
- Years active: 1894-1905
- Spouse: Chief Silver Tongue
- Children: 1 son

Corona Riccardo (c. 1878 – October 15, 1917) was an Italian born American actress who had a brief Broadway stage career before leaving to become a wife and mother. Born in Naples she came to acting in 1894 playing a Mexican girl in a play at the Empire Theatre. Wilson Barrett engaged her for a role in his play The Sign of the Cross which he took on tour of the United States. Riccardo played the role of Ancaria and later played Berenice in the same play. Robert B. Mantell in 1898 who struck by her beauty also cast her in two Shakespeare plays, Romeo and Juliet and Othello. Author Lewis Strang writing in 1899 said Riccardo was the most promising actress in America at the time. Towards the end of 1898 Mantell chose her for another Shakespeare part, Ophelia in Hamlet. Afterwards she was due to join Augustin Daly's Theatre Company but Daly died in 1899. In 1899 she gained her biggest fame by playing Iras in the first stage production of Ben-Hur.

== Later life and family ==
Around 1905, Riccardo left the stage after appearing in Vaudeville in a play about Native Americans. In conjunction with the play she met a man called Chief Silver Tongue, of Native American heritage, and of the Ho-Chunk Nation or Winnebagos. The two fell in love and married and moved to Kansas City, Missouri. On October 16, 1917, while in hospital, Riccardo died leaving her husband and young son.
