= The Richleighs of Tantamount =

1966 novel by Barbara Willard

- First US edition
- Author: Barbara Willard
- Cover artist: C. Walter Hodges
- Genre: Children's literature
- Publisher: Constable (UK); Harcourt, Brace & World (USA)
- Publication date: 1966 (UK); 1967 (USA)
- Media type: Print (Hardcover)
- Pages: 189
- OCLC: 522328

The Richleighs of Tantamount is a children's historical novel written by British author Barbara Willard. It was originally published in the United Kingdom in 1966 by the Constable publishing firm, before being published in the United States by Harcourt, Brace & World in June 1967. C. Walter Hodges drew the line illustrations and painted the cover portrait for the original edition. The book received mostly positive reviews.

== Synopsis ==
Four young siblings—Edwin, Angeline, Sebastian and Maud—live together in a London mansion in Victorian society (ca. the 1870s), along with their wealthy parents. The four children have longed all their lives to visit Tantamount, a castle on the Cornish coast, built by their great-great-great-grandfather. From time to time, the children wonder about its mysterious past as they look at the painting of the castle that dominates a wall in their drawing room.

Their lives are changed one July when their father contracts a serious illness. The children are sent to stay at the castle while their parents go on a sea voyage to repair his health. Only when the children begin to explore do they realize that despite being built and furnished in magnificent style, the castle is suffering from decades of neglect. The tutor and governess are shocked by the condition of the place and leave abruptly. Soon the recently engaged servants do the same, but the children decide to stay on alone.

Regarding themselves as castaways, they enjoy their freedom despite the hardships. They make friends with two local children, Nancy and Dick, and are worried when they disappear. They begin to suspect that the castle is being used for smuggling and even wrecking. Tantamount is destroyed by fire, but when the parents arrive at last they are relieved to find their children have survived.

== Characters ==
=== The Richleigh four ===
- Edwin Richleigh, 16: the eldest and most educated of the siblings, and heir to the family's fortune.
- Angeline Richleigh, 14: rebellious but innocent in appearance.
- Sebastian Richleigh, 11: the big question-asker who always remembers the answers better than his older brother.
- Maud Richleigh, 8: treated by everyone except older Angeline as the baby of the family; she is the prettiest among the four.

=== Their parents ===
- Major Sir Rautboy Richleigh (pronounced Raw-bee), England's third-richest man.
- Lady Daisy, his wife, heiress and earl's daughter.

=== Inside the London house ===
- Mr. Gaunt, Edwin's English tutor.
- Miss Venus, the governess; teacher of Angeline, Sebastian and Maud.
- Old Nurse and New Nurse, the caretakers responsible for the house's upkeep. They both make their first appearances when the book begins.
- Lance, the pageboy, “ready to answer the door if need be”. He also appears at the start of the book.

=== Mentioned by the family ===
- Lady Augusta, Queen Victoria's cousin, who lives across the square near which the Richleighs live.
- Uncle Charles, Sir Rautboy's stern, serious, long-faced brother, whom the four children all dread.

=== At Tantamount and vicinity ===
- Mr. Devine, an agent from Exeter who takes to the castle's upkeep and reports on its conditions annually.
- Mrs. Pengelly, a visitor from England's southern region who assists in helping the four children and company upon their arrival at Tantamount.
- (Mr.) Pengelly, her husband.
- Betsy Pengelly, the Pengellys' daughter.
- Nancy Treloar and her brother Dick Treloar, two local children whom the Richleighs discover during the first day of their visit.
- Kate Treloar, their aunt, who lives miles away from Tantamount at a place called Penwellow.
- Mr. John Pascoe, a kind man who owns a farm called Treligger.
- Mrs. Pascoe, his sour and unjust wife.
- William Treloar, Nancy and Dick's father.

== Reception ==
Critical response to The Richleighs of Tantamount was mostly positive. Writing for the Chicago Tribune, Madeleine L'Engle deemed Richleighs a "beautifully wrought Gothic tale", adding: "Miss Willard has already shown herself to be one of the finest writers for children today, and in this book her talent shows new strength and depth." The Saskatoon Star-Phoenix said, "[This] Victorian atmosphere story...is illustrated in a Dickenson manner which will restore some of the old Christmas spirit to the young of the present days." Clarice Bosacker of the Albert Lea Sunday Tribune remarked, "[The adventure in this book] all combines to make exciting reading for the 12-year-old and up. [With] Willard's large following in England [...] it's a sure bet that The Richleighs of Tantamount will do her reputation no harm." Conversely, The Bulletin of the Center for Children's Books gave it an "NR" ("Not recommended") rating in 1968, writing: "A rather long-winded tale...[whose] fustian and artificial plot cannot quite be overcome by the author's ability to write, frequently, an illuminating descriptive passage."
