= Ben-Hur (play) =

Hippodrama by William W. Young

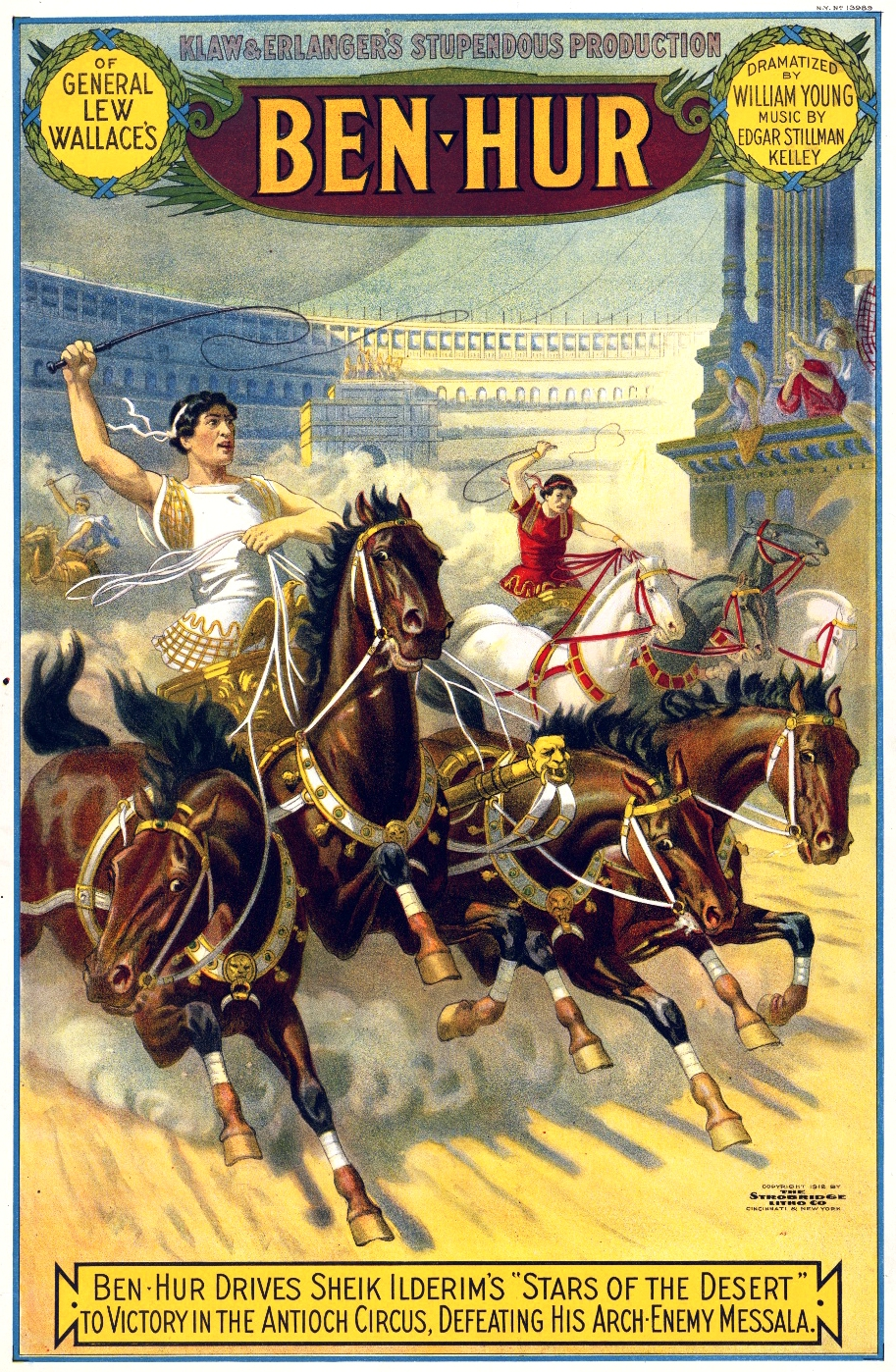
- 1899 poster from the Broadway premiere
- Written by: William W. Young, Lew Wallace
- Genre: Hippodrama, Melodrama

Premiere
- Date: 1899
- Place: Broadway Theatre (41st Street) in New York, NY
- Directed by: Ben Teal

Ben-Hur was an 1899 theatrical adaptation of the 1880 Lew Wallace novel Ben-Hur: A Tale of the Christ. The story was dramatized by William W. Young and produced by Marc Klaw and A. L. Erlanger. The stage production was notable for its elaborate use of spectacle, including live horses for the famous chariot race. The hippodrama had six acts with incidental music written by American composer Edgar Stillman Kelley. The stage production opened at the Broadway Theater in New York City on November 29, 1899, and became a hit Broadway show. Traveling versions of the production, including a national tour that ran for twenty-one years, played in the United States, Great Britain, and Australia. By the end of its run in April 1920, the play had been seen by more than twenty million people and earned over $10 million at the box office. There have been other stage adaptations of Wallace's novel, as well as several motion picture versions.

== History ==
After Wallace's novel was published in 1880, there was widespread demand for it to be adapted for the stage, but Wallace resisted for nearly twenty years, arguing that no one could accurately portray Christ on stage or recreate a realistic chariot race. Despite that resistance, smaller theatre companies adapted the novel for the stage. In 1899, following three months of negotiations, Wallace entered into agreement with theatrical producers Marc Klaw and A. L. Erlanger to adapt his novel into a stage production. Wallace would receive two thirds of the royalties from the production, while Harper and Brothers, the book's publisher, would receive one third.

Playwright William Young wrote the stage adaptation, reducing it to six acts in thirteen scenes. The stage version closely followed the novel's plot and retained portions of its dialog. Edgar Stillman Kelley composed the play's music, but it was its elaborate staging and special effects that created a life-sized visual presentation of Wallace's novel. Ernest Gros and the painter Ernest Albert designed the production's sets.

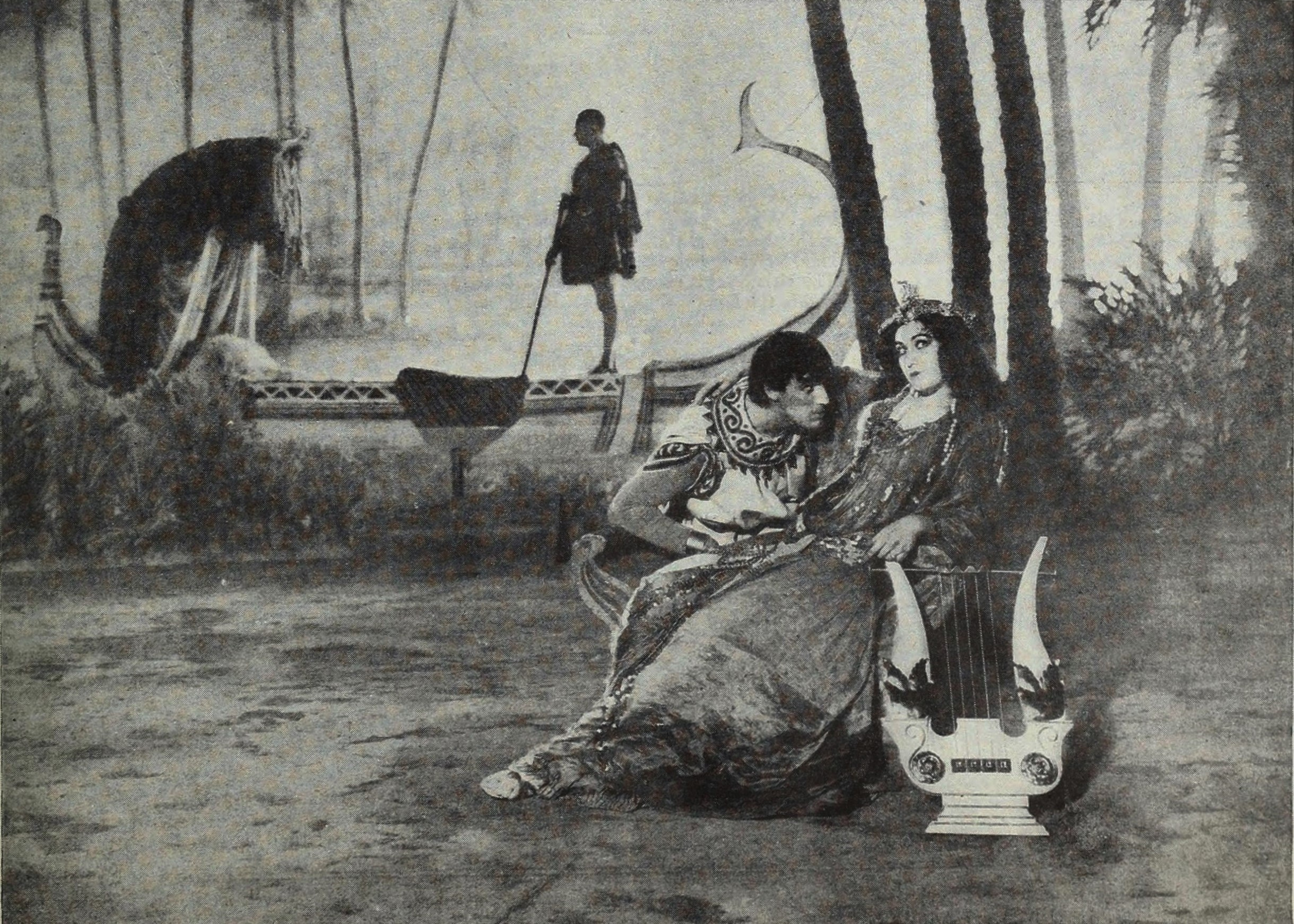
Edward J. Morgan as Judah Ben-Hur and Corona Riccardo as Iras

The character of Ben-Hur was initially cast with Walker Whiteside, but he was replaced by Edward J. Morgan at the last minute. William Farnum replaced Morgan after the show's first season. William S. Hart played Messala. Hart would go on to leading roles in silent films such as The Aryan (1916), and became a silent screen cowboy hero. Farnum also appeared in several films, including The Spoilers (1914). The character of Christ was "represented as a 25,000-candlepower beam of light" and not portrayed by an actor.

The resulting production of Ben-Hur opened at the Broadway Theater in New York City on November 29, 1899. It ran for 194 performances in its first season, before closing on May 10, 1900. Critics of the three-hour-and-twenty-nine-minute performance gave it mixed reviews; however, the audience, many of whom were first-time theatergoers, packed the house. Ben-Hur became a hit show, selling 25,000 tickets per week. The play reopened in New York City on September 3, 1900, and ran for eighteen non-consecutive years on Broadway. The play's twenty-one-year national tour included large venues in cities such as Boston, Philadelphia, Chicago and Baltimore. International versions of the show played in London, England, and in Sydney and Melbourne, Australia. When the play finally closed in April 1920, it had been seen by more than twenty million people and earned over $10 million at the box office.

Fans included William Jennings Bryan, who claimed it was "the greatest play on stage when measured by its religious tone and moral effect". Its popularity is credited with introducing stage shows to a new audience, "many of them devout churchgoers who'd previously been suspicious of the stage". Adaptations of other novels with biblical settings followed Ben-Hur to the stage. These included Quo Vadis in 1901 and Judith of Bethulia in 1904.

== Spectacle ==
The key spectacle of the 1899 show recreated the novel's chariot race with live horses and real chariots running on treadmills against a rotating backdrop. When Wallace saw the elaborate stage sets, he exclaimed, "My God. Did I set all of this in motion?"

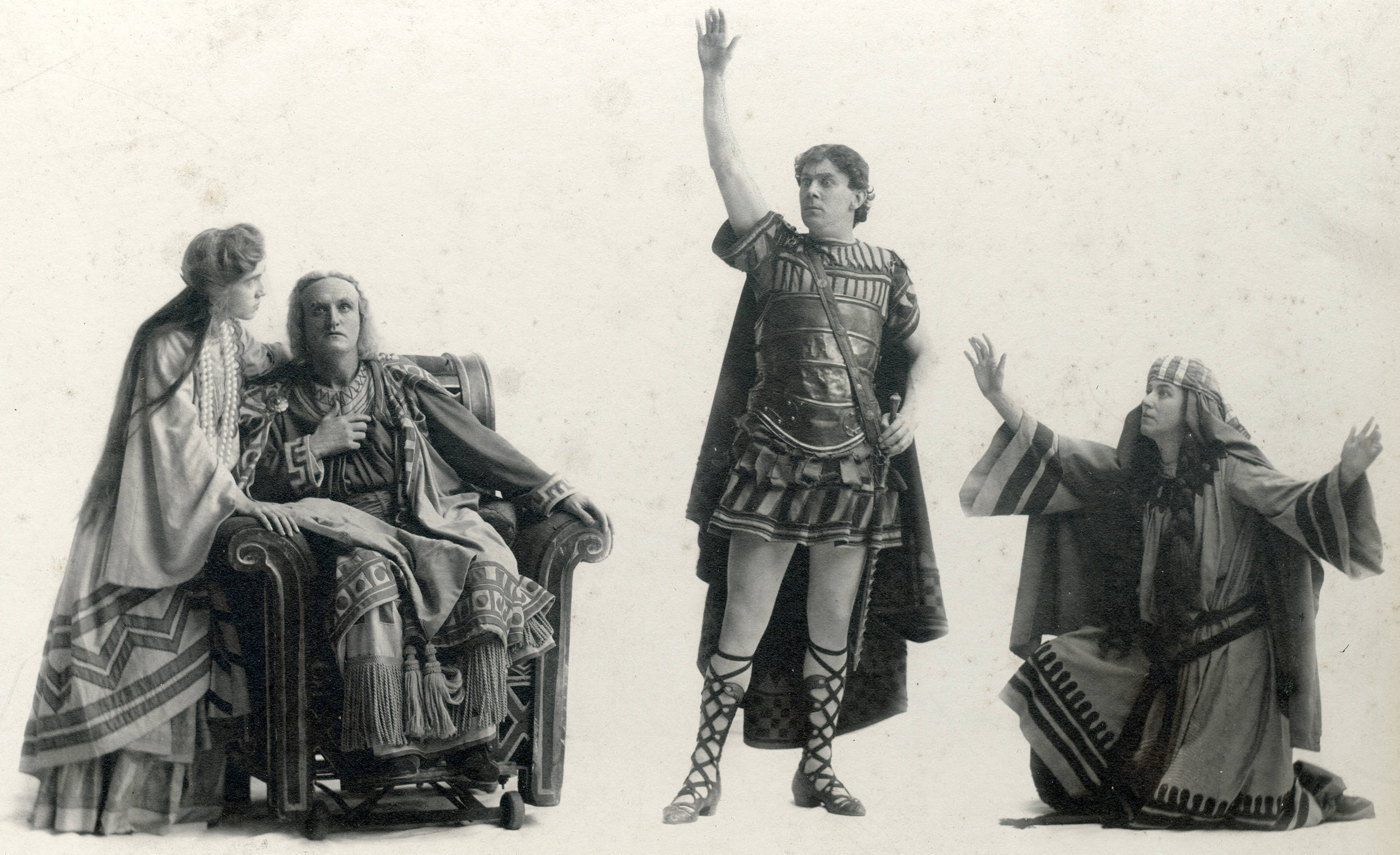
Esther, Simonides, Ben Hur, and Amrah in a 1903 scene

When the play was produced for the London stage, it used four chariots, as opposed to two in the U.S. In 1902, The Era's drama critic detailed how it was achieved with "four great cradles, 20 ft (6.1 m) in length and 14 ft (4.3 m) wide" that are moved "back and front on railways". The horses galloped full-pelt towards the audience, secured with steel cable traces as they ran on treadmills. The horses also drove the movement of a vast cyclorama backdrop that revolved in the opposite direction to create an illusion of rapid speed. Electric rubber rollers spun the chariot wheels, while fans created clouds of dust. A critic for The Illustrated London News described it as "a marvel of stage-illusion" that was "memorable beyond all else". The Sketch's critic called it "thrilling and realistic ... enough to make the fortune of any play" and noted that "the stage, which has to bear 30 tons' weight of chariots and horses, besides huge crowds, has had to be expressly strengthened and shored up".

== Adaptations ==
There have been other stage adaptations since the initial production in 1899, including a London production staged in 2009 at the O2 arena featuring a live chariot race.

The book was also adapted for motion pictures in 1907, 1925, 1959, 2003, 2016, and as an American television miniseries in 2010. The 1959 film adaptation, starring Charlton Heston and featuring the famous chariot race, won a record eleven Academy Awards and was the top-grossing film of 1960.

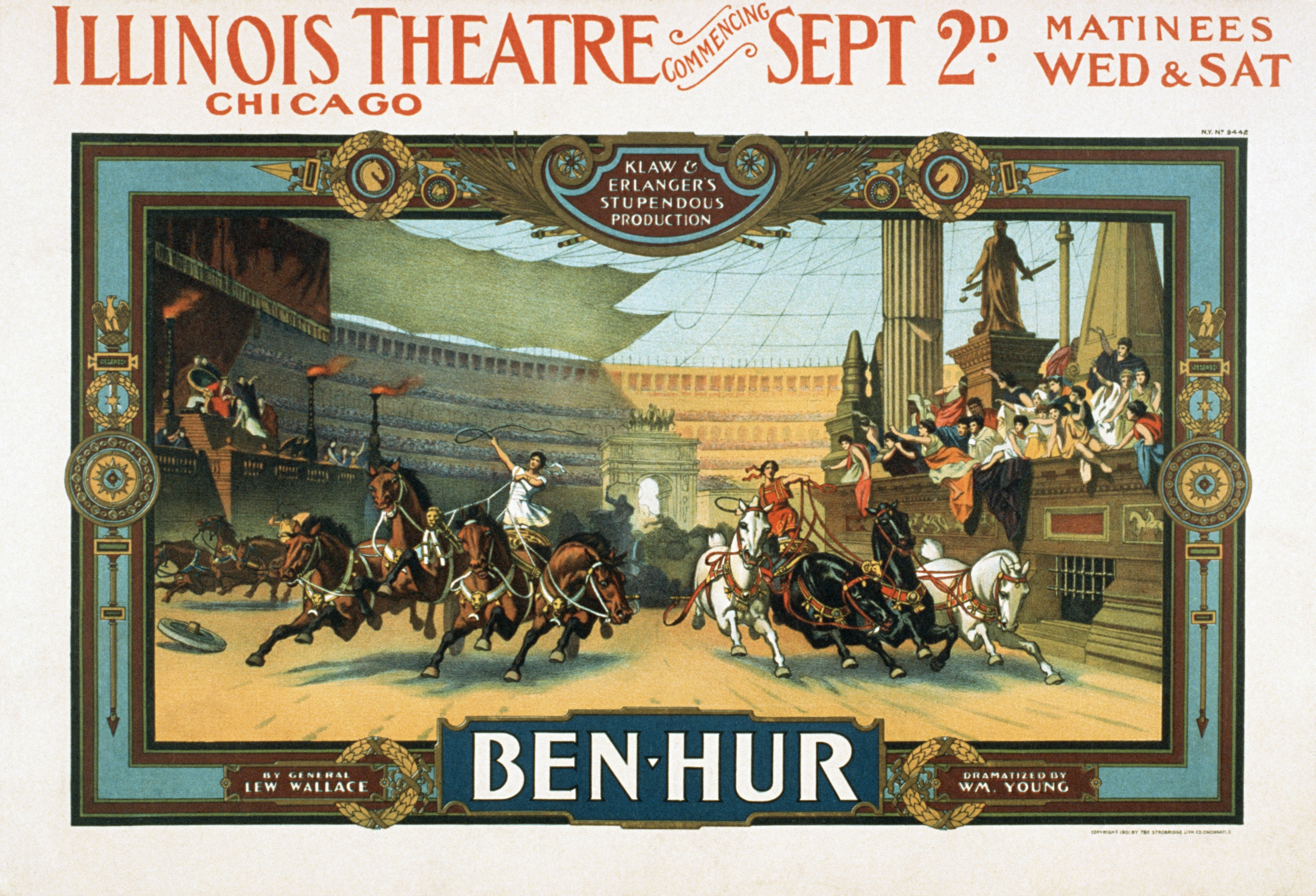
A 1901 poster for a production at the Illinois Theater in Chicago
