= E. S. Willard =

English actor (1853–1915)

Edward Smith Willard
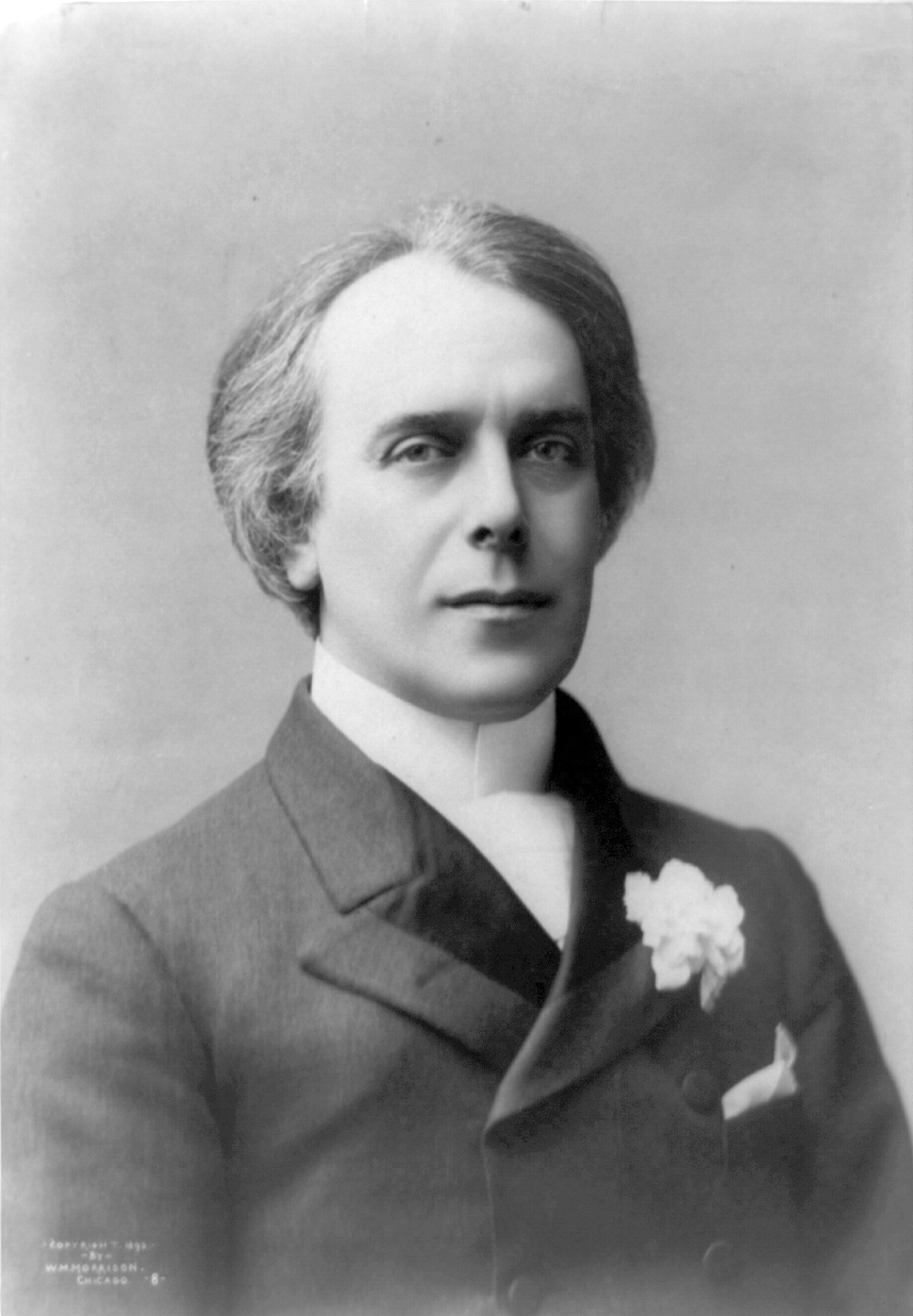
- Willard in 1893, photo by W. M. Morrison
- Born: 9 January 1853; Brighton, England, UK
- Died: 9 November 1915 (aged 62); London, England
- Occupation: Stage Actor
- Spouse: Emily Waters

Signature
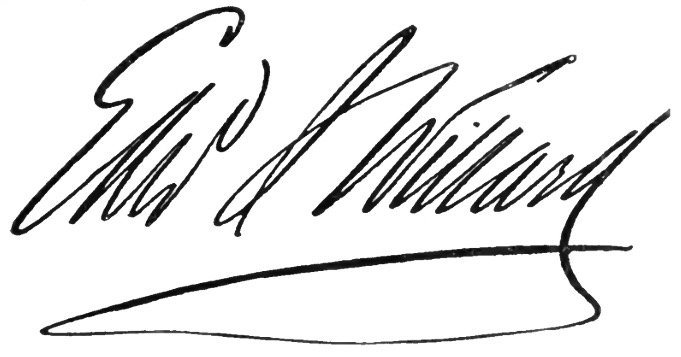

Edward Smith Willard (9 January 1853 – 9 November 1915) was an English actor. He was born at Brighton and made his debut upon the stage at Weymouth in The Lady of Lyons in 1869. He then toured with E. A. Sothern and later joined various stock companies. Coming to London in 1875, he played Antonio in The Merchant of Venice with Charles Rice in 1876. After a varied experience in Shakespearean and other plays, in 1881 he was engaged by Wilson Barrett at the Princess Theatre, where he played in The Lights of London, The Silver King, and other well-known pieces. In 1886, he made a hit as Jim the Penman at the Haymarket.

One of his greatest successes was his production of The Middleman by Henry Arthur Jones, at the Shaftesbury in 1889, he himself creating the part of Cyrus Blenkarn. He came to the United States in 1890, and made his first appearance at Palmer's Theatre (later, Wallack's Theatre) in New York, 10 November 1890, when he again acted in The Middleman, and the greeting that hailed him was that of earnest respect.

When Willard played the part of Judah Llewellyn for the first time in America, 29 December 1890, at Palmer's Theatre, he gained a verdict of emphatic admiration. Willard had long been known and esteemed, in New York, by the dramatic profession and by those persons who habitually observed the changing aspects of the Stage on both sides of the ocean, but to the American public his name had been comparatively strange. He sailed to England, then returned again to the United States in 1896, remaining till 1903, when he made 13 American tours.

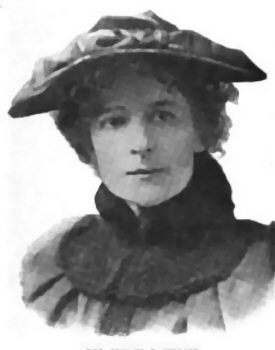
Mrs. E. S. Willard, Ladies' Home Journal (1893)

In 1906, he retired from the stage, but returned on special occasions, as in 1911 for the gala performance at His Majesty's Theatre, London, to play the part of Brutus in the forum scene from Julius Caesar.

In 1875 Willard married Emily Waters, the daughter of a government civil servant attached to the Woolwich Arsenal station in London. Emily Waters was originally an actress but later turned to writing children's stories and plays under the pseudonym Rachel Penn.

Edward Smith Willard was the uncle of Shakespearen actor Edmund Willard and the great-uncle of children's author Barbara Willard. Willard died in London on 9 November 1915.
