= Ben-Hur (2016 film) =

Film by Timur Bekmambetov

- Theatrical release poster
- Directed by: Timur Bekmambetov
- Screenplay by: Keith Clarke; John Ridley
- Based on: Ben-Hur: A Tale of the Christ by Lew Wallace
- Produced by: Sean Daniel; Joni Levin; Duncan Henderson
- Starring: Jack Huston; Toby Kebbell; Rodrigo Santoro; Nazanin Boniadi; Ayelet Zurer; Morgan Freeman
- Cinematography: Oliver Wood
- Edited by: Dody Dorn
- Music by: Marco Beltrami
- Production companies: Paramount Pictures; Metro-Goldwyn-Mayer Pictures; The Sean Daniel Company; Lightworkers Media
- Distributed by: Paramount Pictures
- Release dates: August 9, 2016 (Mexico City); August 19, 2016 (United States)
- Running time: 125 minutes
- Countries: United States; Italy
- Language: English
- Budget: $100–110 million
- Box office: $94.1 million

Ben-Hur is a 2016 epic historical drama film directed by Timur Bekmambetov, and written by Keith Clarke and John Ridley. It is the fifth film adaptation of the 1880 novel Ben-Hur: A Tale of the Christ by Lew Wallace and the third version produced by Metro-Goldwyn-Mayer. It has been termed a "re-adaptation", "reimagining", and "new interpretation" of the novel, and follows Judah Ben-Hur, a young prince who is falsely accused by his step-brother, an officer of the Roman army, and is sent to slavery, only to escape and seek vengeance. The film stars Jack Huston as the titular character, alongside Toby Kebbell, Rodrigo Santoro, Nazanin Boniadi, Ayelet Zurer, and Morgan Freeman. It was filmed in Matera, Italy, from February to June 2015.

Ben-Hur premiered on August 9, 2016, in Mexico City and was theatrically released by Paramount Pictures on August 19, 2016, in the United States. It received generally negative reviews from critics and underperformed at the box office, grossing $94 million worldwide against its $100 million production budget plus a large amount spent on marketing and distribution.

== Plot ==
Jewish prince Judah Ben-Hur and his adopted Roman brother Messala are best friends despite their different origins. After Messala's interest in Judah's sister Tirzah is rebuffed by her mother, he enlists in the Roman army. Ben-Hur marries his slave Esther after Messala leaves.

Three years later, Messala returns as a decorated Roman officer. His return coincides with a rising insurrection by the Zealots, Jews opposed to Roman rule. Ben-Hur begrudgingly treats and shelters a young Zealot named Dismas and attempts to dissuade him from the cause. Messala reunites with Ben-Hur and attempts to convince him to serve as an informant - the new governor Pontius Pilate is coming to Jerusalem and Messala does not want any revolt. Judah claims he will talk to the locals.

During Pilate's march, Dismas attempts to assassinate Pilate from Ben-Hur's balcony. The Romans storm Ben-Hur's household and arrest him and his family. Rather than betray Dismas, Ben-Hur takes responsibility for the assassination attempt and his mother and sister are sentenced to crucifixion. While being led to the prison galley, Ben-Hur encounters Jesus, who gives him water. Ben-Hur then endures five years of slavery as a rower aboard a Roman prison galley.

During a battle against Greek rebels in the Ionian Sea, Ben-Hur's galley is destroyed. Ben-Hur frees himself and is washed ashore on a ship mast. He is found by Sheik Ilderim, who recognizes him as an escaped slave. Ben-Hur convinces Ilderim not to hand him over to the Romans by treating one of Ilderim's racing horses. After Ben-Hur develops a bond with the four racing horses, an appreciative Ilderim then trains Ben-Hur to be a chariot racer.

Ben-Hur and Ilderim travel to Jerusalem to take part in a chariot race. Jesus' preaching ministry draws the attention of governor Pilate and Messala, who is now the commander of the Roman garrison and a champion chariot racer. In Jerusalem, Ben-Hur encounters Esther, who is now a follower of Jesus and involved in charity work. Despite their reunion, the two are kept emotionally apart due to her new cause, which contradicts his intention of seeking revenge against Messala.

Ben-Hur confronts Messala alone in their former home but is forced to flee when Roman soldiers turn up. After the Romans execute twenty Jews in reprisal, Esther completely falls out with Ben-Hur. Just before the race, Ben-Hur encounters a former Roman soldier named Druses, who informs him that his mother Naomi and sister Tirzah are still alive. However, their reunion is soured when Ben-Hur discovers his mother and sister have leprosy, and Ben-Hur is enraged at their condition.

Ilderim convinces Pilate to allow Ben-Hur to compete by proposing a high wager against Messala. Esther tries to convince Messala not to race Ben-Hur, but he is confident in his victory. On the day of the race, Ben-Hur follows Ilderim's instructions to hold back until the final laps. Using underhanded tactics, Messala knocks out other charioteers. After Messala attempts to destroy Ben-Hur's chariot, their chariots become tangled together. When Messala tries to kick Ben-Hur from his chariot, his chariot breaks loose and he is trampled. Ben-Hur wins, the Jewish spectators begin attacking the Romans and Ben-Hur is carried away.

Despite his victory, Ben-Hur is despondent about his family and Messala's fate. Esther is with Jesus in the Garden of Gethsemane; later she and Ben-Hur witness Jesus bearing the cross. Mirroring a previous encounter with Jesus, Ben-Hur tries to offer Jesus water but is beaten by a Roman soldier. Esther and Judah witness Jesus' death on the cross, Naomi and Tirzah are miraculously healed and Ilderim pays a ransom to set them free. Ben-Hur seeks out an injured Messala who initially swears to continue hunting Ben-Hur. After experiencing Ben-Hur's kindness and forgiveness, Messala relents and they reconcile. Ben-Hur and Messala return to his family who all leave Jerusalem with Ilderim.

== Cast ==
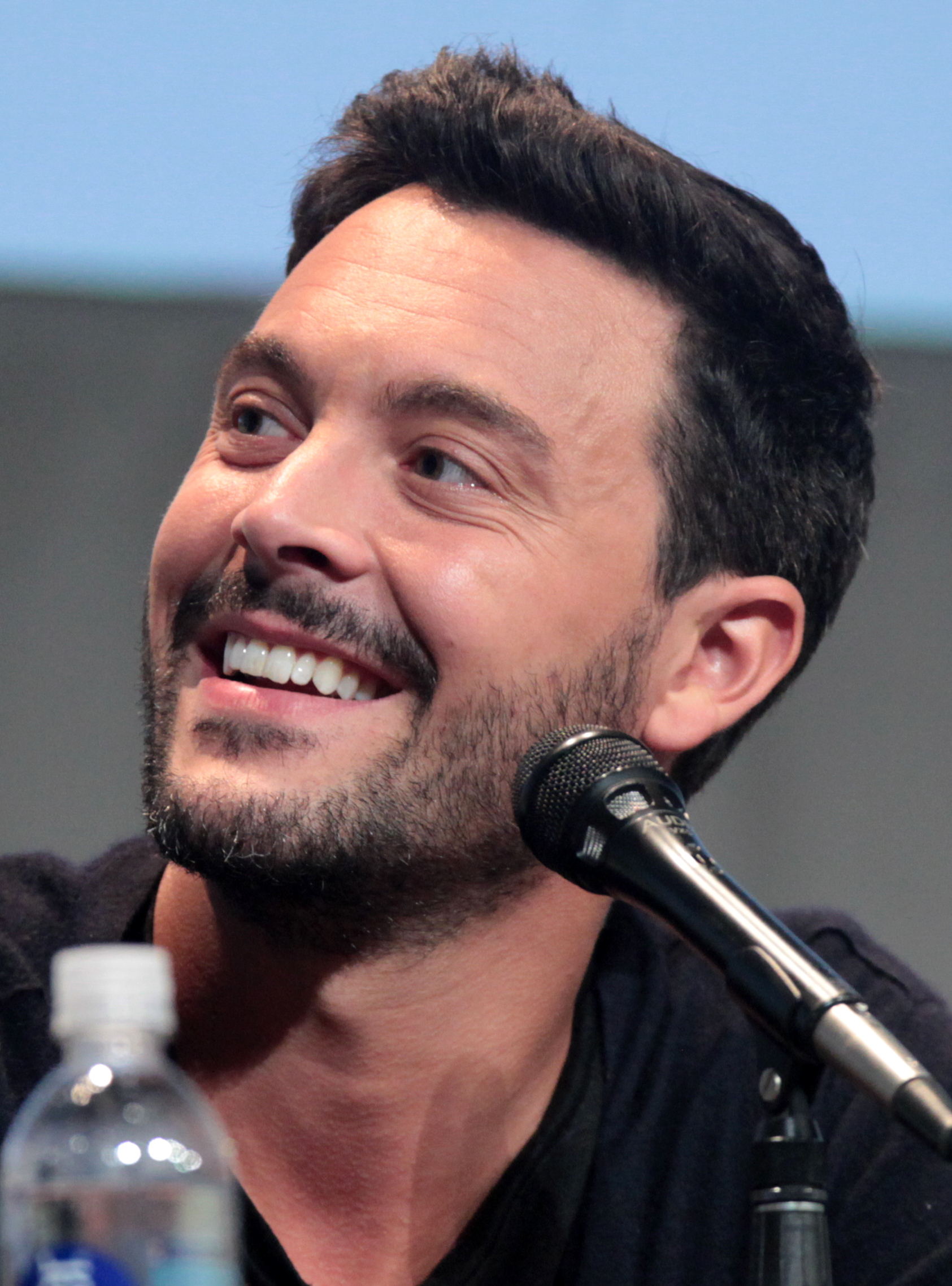
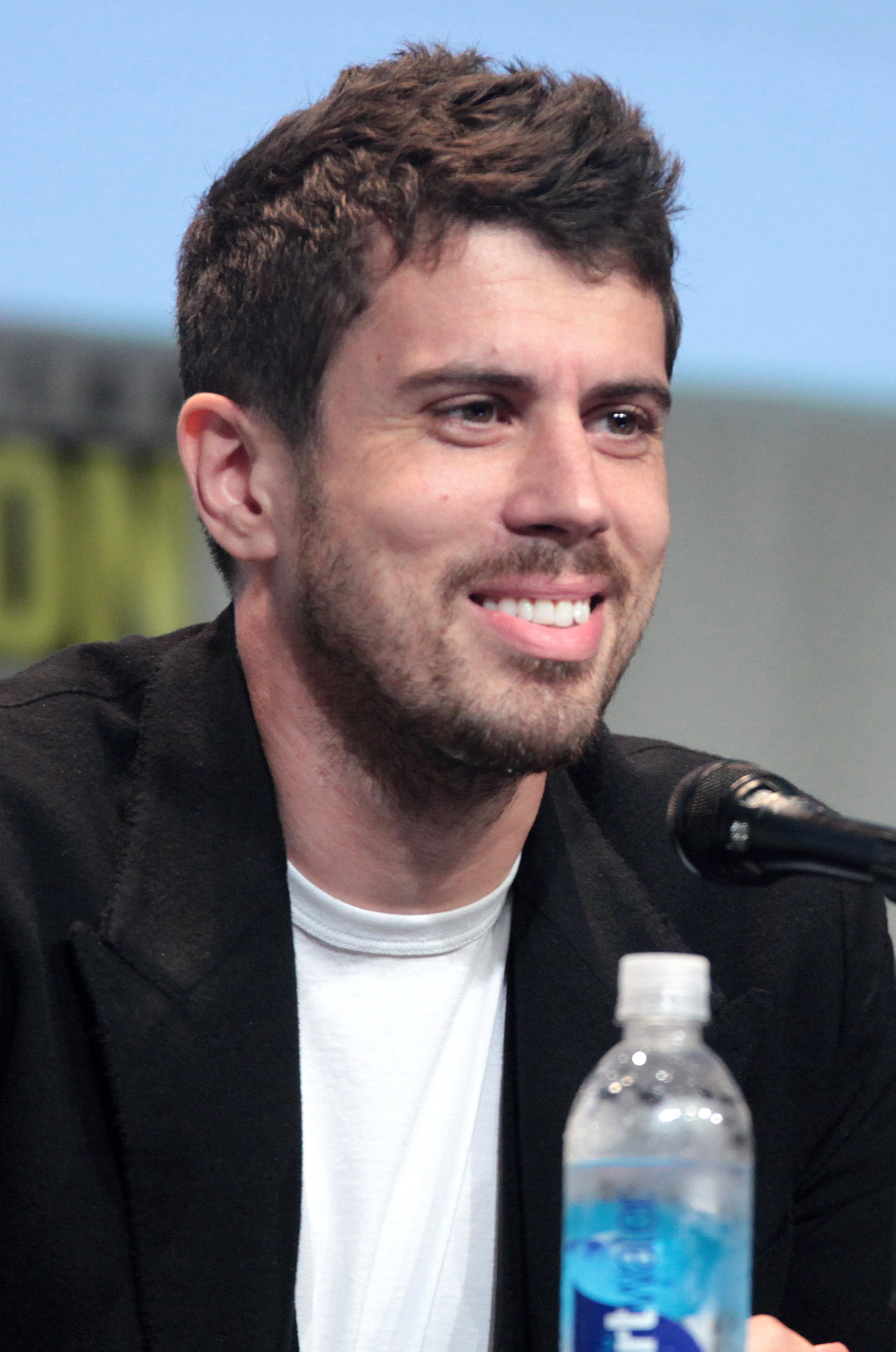
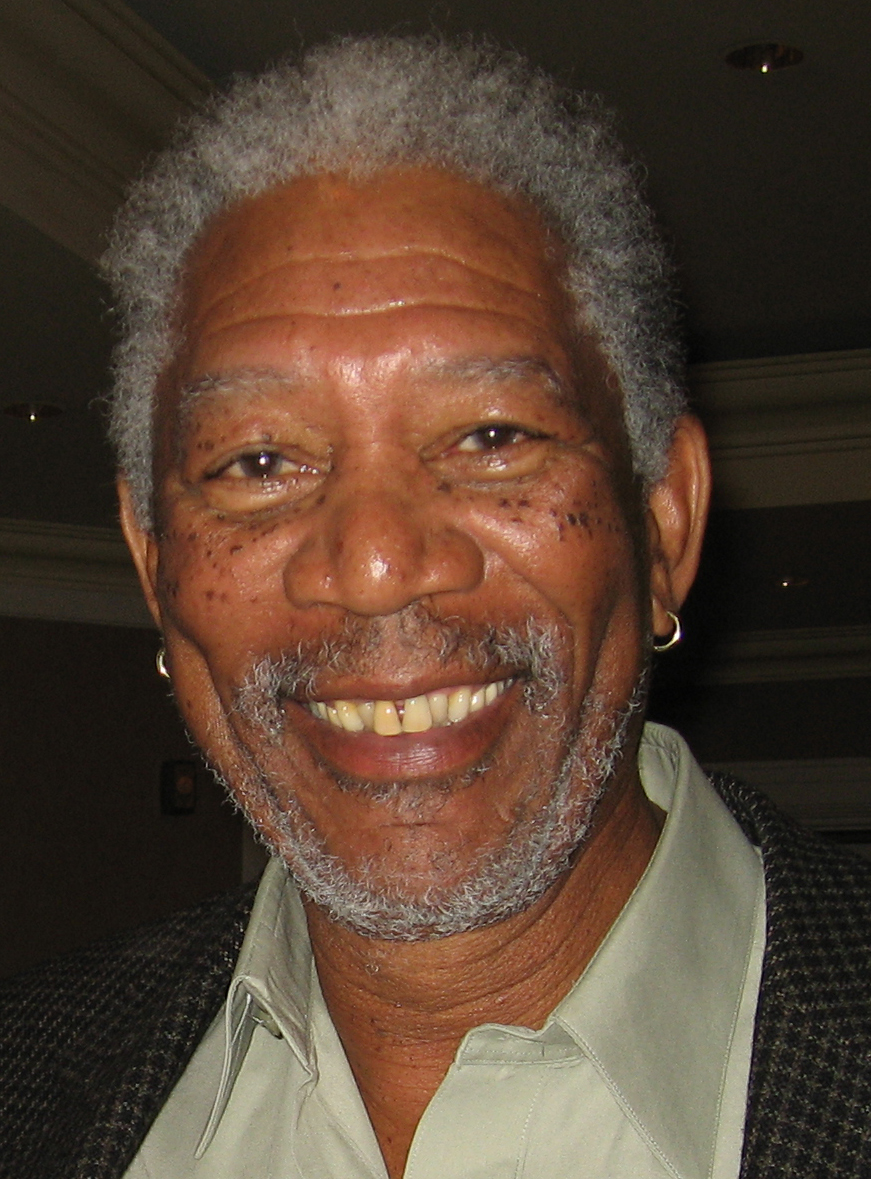
Top to bottom: Jack Huston, Toby Kebbell, and Morgan Freeman star in the film as, respectively, Judah Ben-Hur, Messala, and Sheik Ilderim.
- Jack Huston as Judah Ben-Hur:

A Jewish prince in Roman-occupied Jerusalem who is betrayed and falsely accused of treason, and is sentenced to a life of slavery. Ben-Hur loses everything and spends five years in the galley of a Roman slave ship. He later takes on the Roman Empire and his adoptive brother, in a grand chariot race, while finding redemption and being forever changed after a series of encounters with Jesus Christ. Charlton Heston's daughter-in-law is a friend of Huston's family, and he met Charlton a few times before he died. "I remember being very struck by the film when I was younger," Huston has said. The leper scene, especially, stuck in his mind. He re-watched the 1959 film prepping for this version. He was initially offered the role of Messala, but director Bekmambetov decided instead he had the sympathetic manner and grit to play the title role. Bekmambetov found Huston to be an actor who not only was a "well-built, experienced horseman" but one who "felt like he was born in that era." He said, "I wouldn't be surprised if some of Jack's many famous ancestors took part in an actual fight between Romans and Judaeans we depict in our film." Tom Hiddleston was originally considered for the role.
Huston was well aware of the comparisons being made between him and Heston, saying: "Of course there are going to be haters, that's par for the course when you're retelling such an infamous tale. It's like Kenneth Branagh going to do Romeo and Juliet again for, like, the 50th time. [But] I think one of the greatest compliments one could ever be giving to [author] Lew Wallace is that we're still reimagining his work more than 120 years later, because it's so powerful."

- Toby Kebbell as Messala:

An officer in the Roman army, and Ben-Hur's childhood friend and adoptive brother, who betrays him.

- Morgan Freeman as Sheik Ilderim:

A wealthy Nubian sheik who trains Ben-Hur to become a charioteer to take revenge on his brother, Messala. Unlike Wyler's version, who was a secondary character, and an essentially comic one, there is no humor in this version. Moreover, Ilderim "has quite a bit of power in the story. And I like playing power. It's something about my own personal ego", Freeman said. Freeman is part of the international cast in the film. Producer Daniel spoke about that, saying: "the movie business was never as global as it is today, so it makes sense from a creative and commercial point of view to do this movie for the whole world."

- Nazanin Boniadi as Esther:

A Jewish slave and the wife of Ben-Hur. Boniadi was very pleased by the fact that the women's roles in the film were expanded, unlike the previous versions. She described her character as "very strong-willed and independent", which to her was very refreshing, given the era that this film is set in. She added, "compared to the 1959 film, Esther definitely has more of a presence, she's definitely a stronger woman and a stronger character".

- Rodrigo Santoro as Jesus:

Unlike the original film, Christ has a prominent role in this version. Paramount Pictures' vice chairman Rob Moore stated that Christ in this version "is going to be consistent with people's expectations," and that the "expectations of the faithful will be honored by this one." Paramount sought to avoid the sort of backlash received by Darren Aronofsky's Noah, where some Christians were dismayed by the film's inventive interpretation of the Bible. Santoro said it was the most challenging role he had ever taken on. He received personal blessings from Pope Francis for his role as Christ.

- Sofia Black-D'Elia as Tirzah:

Ben-Hur's sister.

- Ayelet Zurer as Naomi:

Ben-Hur's mother.

- Haluk Bilginer as Simonides:

A loyal Jewish servant to Ithamar, Judah's birth father; becomes a wealthy merchant in Antioch.

- Moisés Arias as Dismas:

A teenage Jewish zealot whose family has been murdered by the Romans and is desperate to fight for his people's freedom; he is later crucified beside Jesus.

- Pilou Asbæk as Pontius Pilate:

The Roman governor of Judea who oversees the chariot race.

- Marwan Kenzari as Druses:

A Roman captain who is involved with the betrayal by Messala that sends Ben-Hur on his path to redemption.

- James Cosmo as Quintus Arius

The Roman admiral of the trireme that Ben-Hur was enslaved on as a rower.

== Production ==
=== Development ===
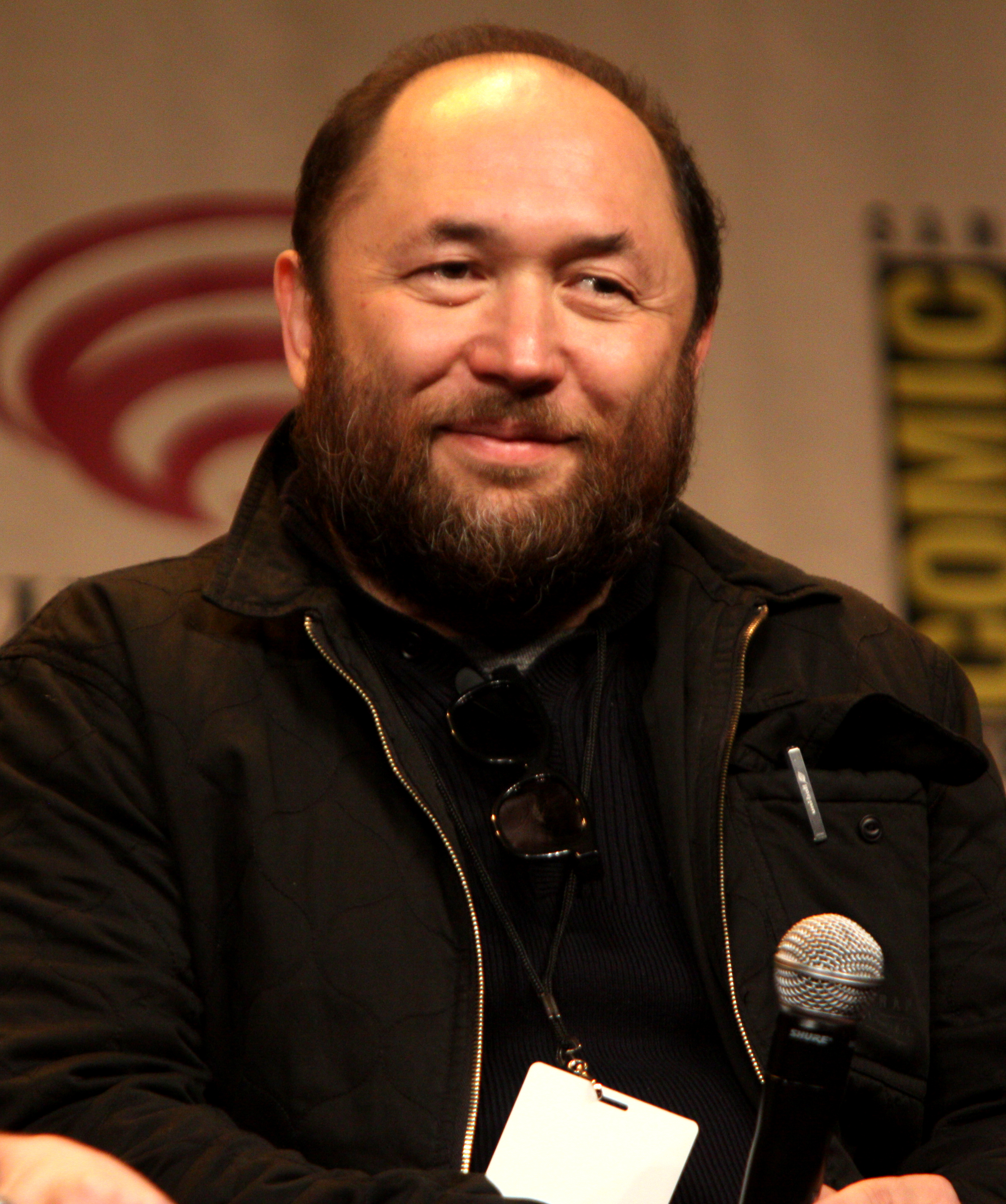
Timur Bekmambetov directed the film.

In 2013, Metro-Goldwyn-Mayer acquired Keith R. Clarke's script, an adaptation of Lew Wallace's 1880 novel Ben-Hur: A Tale of the Christ, which is in the public domain.

In April 2014, Paramount Pictures and MGM announced that they would co-produce a new version of Ben-Hur, based on the novel, with Mark Burnett and Roma Downey serving as producer and executive producer, respectively. MGM had previously released two films based on the book, the 1925 silent film and the more famous 1959 film of same name. The rights to the latter film were sold to Ted Turner in the 1980s. MGM had just emerged from bankruptcy due to the global success of the twenty-third James Bond film, Skyfall, and The Hobbit: An Unexpected Journey, which both went to gross over $1 billion at the box office worldwide, including above $300 million in the United States and Canada, while Paramount were doing well at the time with the biblical tale Noah. John Ridley (12 Years a Slave) was hired to revise the script, with Sean Daniel, Burnett and Joni Levin attached to produce, and Downey, Clarke, and Jason Brown executive producing. Duncan Henderson was later attached to produce, with John Ridley also executive producing. It was announced that the new film would differ from the 1959 version, and deal with the formative relationships of Ben-Hur and Messala growing up as best friends, before the Roman Empire took control of Jerusalem, and that Jesus would have a prominent role.

This movie is about the Roman Empire, how seductive and glamorous and dangerous its ideas are—it's about power and competition. And we live in this world. We live in the Roman Empire today—and this movie is trying to find a way how we can survive today. It's not a movie about Jesus' time, it's a movie about us.

— Director Timur Bekmambetov explaining the version of the film.

In September 2013, Timur Bekmambetov was hired to direct the film. Bekmambetov was initially reluctant to direct and did not wish to tackle a film whose predecessor had so much impact. After producer Sean Daniel persuaded him to read the script, he accepted it, saying "I read the script. And suddenly I understood this story is not what I expected. It's not a remake, it's an interpretation of the famous book." He stated the story of Ben-Hur reminded him of Romeo and Juliet, Hamlet, and Anton Chekhov's work. He was fascinated by the 1959 film but found the focus on revenge rather than forgiveness to be the main problem; this was the prime difference between the book and the 1959 movie: the book was written about forgiveness, and the movie was about revenge and miracles. Hence, he wanted to stress the themes of forgiveness and love rather than mere vengeance. He found "the most important values of pride, rivalry, power, strength, the dictatorship of power and self-love" that were prominent in the Roman Empire to be the primary subjects in this version. He said that the film is not just the story of Ben-Hur, but rather the shared story of him and his brother, Messala. Bekmambetov was aware of the comparisons being made with the earlier classical adapted films, and hence felt the need to make the film very different from the others. As a result, he decided to make a realistic drama film rather than a large tent-pole attraction. The director did not set out to make a more stylized version of the past, as he did with Abraham Lincoln: Vampire Hunter; he wanted to make a film that was more grounded and tangible.

Producer Mark Burnett stated that films like Ben-Hur, which are centered on faith and the messages of Jesus, need to feel like epic summer blockbusters in order to attract younger and secular audiences. He explained that part of what caused the immensity of the budget—$100 million—are the special effects and the 3D experience that young audiences are expecting. MGM financed 80% of the production costs, while the remaining 20% were covered by Paramount.

In June 2015, Rob Moore, the vice chairman of Paramount, explained that this version is not so much a remake of the 1959 film, but a new interpretation of the Lew Wallace novel on which both are based.

It's going to be different in the sense that the original writer Keith Clarke wrote an amazing script and then went back to the Lew Wallace novel and really excavated the relationship between the two main characters, Ben-Hur and Messala. It's interesting to a degree. It's kind of like going after Jimi Hendrix, because there are things about the 1959 movie that we think we remember, there are things that really happened, including obviously the chariot race, so it's going to be different in the sense that we're not really trying to completely chase the movie people remember but there are elements of that movie: the heart of the film, the emotional drive of the film that we want to try to bring to a whole new audience. I think it's an interesting project. It's certainly challenging. It's certainly one that people are going to come into with expectations, but like anything you do, you gotta exceed those expectations to a degree and also not worry about them because at its core, we hope and believe that we've got something that's unique.

— John Ridley.

John Ridley re-wrote the script based on an original screenplay by Keith Clarke, which itself was based on Lew Wallace's 1880 novel Ben-Hur: A Tale of the Christ. Ridley admired how Clarke went back to the source material and focused his attention on the subjects of racial slavery and colonization, and the deep relationships between the two friends. He was more drawn to the project since it dealt with themes of faith in a very "potent manner". The studio approached him in October 2013, after he wrote the screenplay for 12 Years a Slave, which went on to win an Oscar the following year. The studio wanted him to make "a production polish that deals with just honing the story and making it filmable."

Tom Hiddleston was originally considered for the title role, Judah Ben-Hur. Jack Huston was later cast instead. On September 11, Morgan Freeman was added to the cast to play Sheik Ilderim, the man who teaches Ben-Hur to become a champion chariot racer. On September 18, sources confirmed that Toby Kebbell was in early talks to play the villain, Messala. On October 15, Gal Gadot was in talks to join the film as Esther, the slave with whom Ben-Hur is in love. Pedro Pascal from the TV series Game of Thrones was in talks to play Pontius Pilate. On October 30, TheWrap confirmed that Gadot's negotiations with Paramount and MGM had ended, and the actress had withdrawn, reportedly due to scheduling conflicts with Batman v Superman: Dawn of Justice. On November 4, Marwan Kenzari was added to the cast as Druses, a Roman captain. On November 11, Ayelet Zurer was in final negotiations to play Naomi, Judah Ben-Hur's mother (Miriam in the book and the 1959 adaptation). On 13 November, Olivia Cooke was being considered for Tirzah, Ben-Hur's sister. On December 2, Nazanin Boniadi was confirmed as the actress who would play Esther. On January 12, 2015, Sofia Black-D'Elia was cast as Ben-Hur's sister, Tirzah. On January 13, Rodrigo Santoro was announced as Jesus. On January 20, Moisés Arias was added to the cast to play Gestas, a teenage Jewish zealot who is desperate to fight for freedom, after his family has been murdered by the Romans. On January 21, Pilou Asbæk was cast as Pontius Pilate, replacing Pascal for the role.

=== Principal photography ===
On February 2, 2015, MGM and Paramount Pictures announced that principal photography had begun and that, like the original film, filming would take place mostly in Italy, specifically in Rome and Matera. The Sassi di Matera in Basilicata and the Cinecittà studios in Rome were also chosen among the film's settings. In most instances, CGI were used extensively. However, Bekmambetov wanted to rely more on practical effects and tried to do as little CGI as possible in moments where it was not heavily needed.

Producers Roma Downey and Mark Burnett chose Matera as a location for Jerusalem, one of the same locations where Mel Gibson's biblical movie The Passion of the Christ was filmed. Exterior shooting lasted for two months, and finished in early April 2015. Production then moved to Cinecittà Studios, where interior shooting took place for four months, including the chariot scene, among others. Around 2,000 extras were used throughout the film.

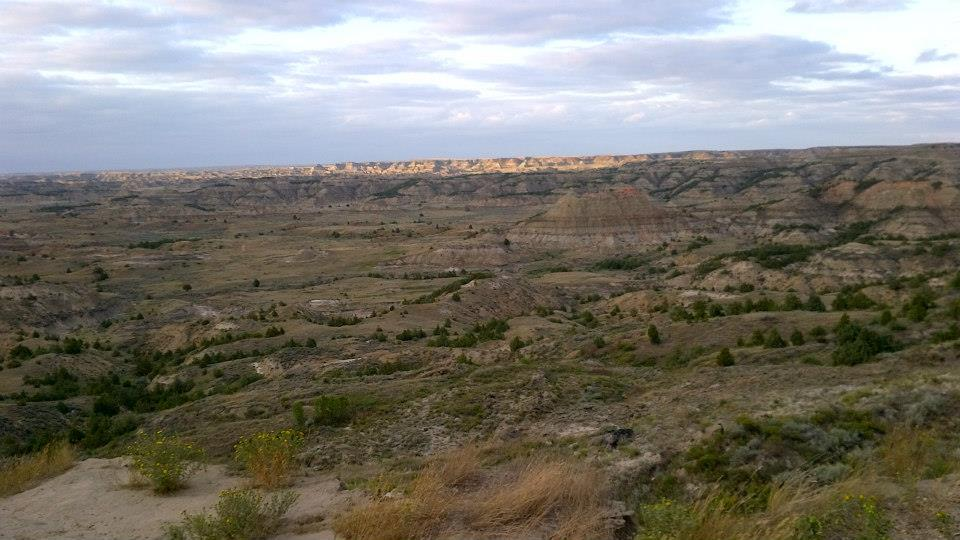
Painted Canyon in Billings County, North Dakota, served as one of the filming locations for Ben-Hur.

In March 2016, Adam Sidman, an associate of Timur Bekmambetov, sent a request to the Bureau of Land Management's South Coast in Palm Springs, which oversees federal land in the Coachella Valley area, asking if the team can shoot a horse scene in the Painted Canyon, which is off Box Canyon Road, with two horses, several cameras, and a film crew of about 30. His application was rejected, and Sidman thought it was because of the size of the production. He then tried to negotiate again, but to no avail. He then contacted the executive director of the Greater Palm Springs Film Alliance office, Levi Vincent, to look into the matter. To Vincent, it almost seemed like the rejection was based on arbitrary reasons. With the help of local lawmakers, they were able to convinced the BLM to approve the request, but this time with a much-scaled down production of 8 crew members, no horses, and the use of a drone rather than handheld cameras.

==== Chariot race sequence ====
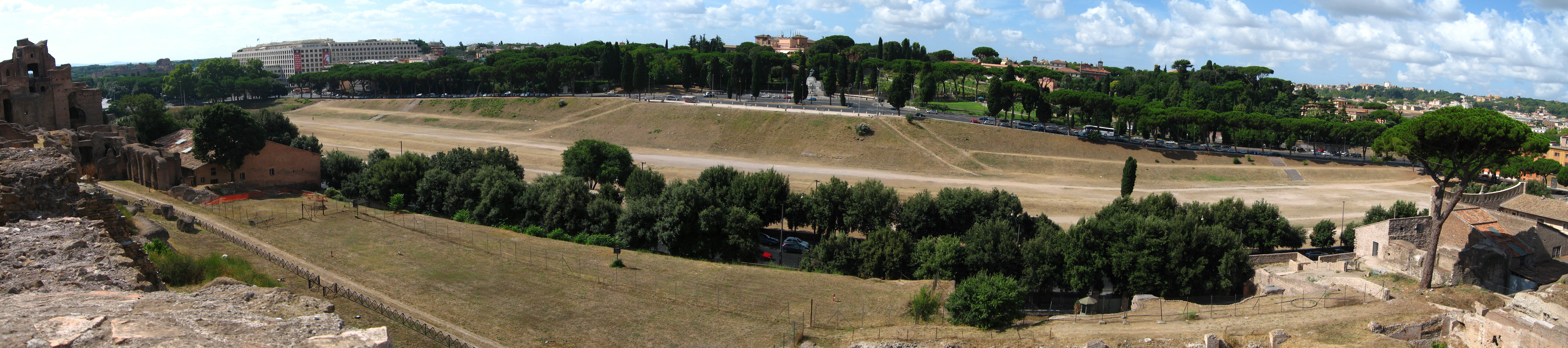
The chariot race was originally planned to be filmed at the Circus Maximus arena in Rome, but access was denied due to fear that the stunts would damage the historic site.

The famous chariot race sequence, which runs about 10 minutes, almost exactly the same as in the prior films, was originally planned to be filmed in the Circus Maximus arena in Rome; however, producers were denied access by Italy's national cultural authorities due to fears that the stunts would damage the fragile historic site, which was under restoration at that time. The filming location had been approved by local officials, as well as Rome's mayor, Ignazio Marino, who lamented the decision to deny the producers access, saying, "The aim of the city administration isn't so much to raise revenue in exchange for the use of public space, but to give back to Rome the role of being a big international set, which is in our history and our tradition." According to sources obtained by The Guardian, the decision to forbid Ben-Hur from filming there was due to "technical" issues. Though no official reasons had been given, archaeological experts speculated that the influx of heavy filming vehicles and hundreds of extras to the arena could have caused untold damage to the site. However, the Italian cultural minister, Dario Franceschini, declined to comment. As a result, producers were forced to film the scene at Cinecittà Studios, where much of the 1959 film was also shot. It is not clear whether the filmmakers had planned to use that location for the main chariot race, which is supposed to take place in Antioch, or if they were planning to shoot one of the earlier races that Judah Ben-Hur takes part in while he is still living in Rome. Bekmambetov, however, cited the size of the stadium as too large for shooting as the reason.

The whole race was planned in advance, in several iterations of storyboards and animated previsualization videos. In order to re-create the sequence, producers and horse race track experts built a 1,000-foot-long arena, with a 250 metre long and 50 metre wide track, stands, and gates, called Circus Tiberius, at Cinecittà World, a film-themed amusement park about 45 minutes south of Rome. It was built partly on the back lot of producer Dino De Laurentiis's former studio complex. According to production designer Naomi Shohan, arena designs were compiled from archaeological records of circuses in Roman territories. One-sixth of the arena was physically built and the rest was added to the film by computer graphics. Unique chariots were also built based on original references. A total of 86 horses were supplied by horse master Steve Dent, with back-up animals, and were trained for several months, to be able to race at 40 miles per hour. Dent has assembled larger stables for films like Ridley Scott's Robin Hood (2010), but said that "this was more of a worry job." There were 60 handlers for the horses, and 12 horses were put in rotation for every four horse-drawn carriage, so the animals would have a chance to rest. Multiple chariots were made for each character—some with brakes (though the horses are strong enough to overpower the brakes), some with room for a second "blind driver" or 'bonnet-fitted' camera, some with different-sized wheels for filming on the turns instead of the straights, and some to flip over or crash. Massimo Pauletto, an art director on the film who built the chariots, said that his team had to reinvent a forgotten skill, "from the sketches, nobody was understanding how they could become real," and the toughest part was to fit together practical needs and special-effects needs. Problems cropped up day-by-day as the bolts that held the chariots together kept being broken by the horses due to their immense strength, and the bar that attached the horses was bent. As a result, the crew had to learn how to build a new one week after week.

To capture the thunderous feel of the race, the film crew attached microphones to the horses to record the sound of pounding hooves, and GoPro cameras were buried in the sand. The cameras were also planted on chariots and people, one of which was placed on a soccer ball in the middle of the track while the horses ran over it. Huston and Kebbell spent two and a half months preparing and rehearsing to learn how to drive chariot races in Italy, six days a week. It took time for the stuntmen to learn to drive them, and they were only called in for extremely dangerous stunts. But overall, it was actors in the chariots. A total of 20 chariots were used. A bulk of scenes were done using real practical stunts, without any CGI assistance, and digital models were only used when filming was too dangerous. Around 400 extras were used as spectators (which were then increased to around 100,000 with special effects). Bekmambetov's goal was to shoot these action scenes so realistically that the audience feels that they are inside the chariot and driving it. He was inspired by YouTube videos and Instagram photos, "The camerawork is very specific when we see NASCAR or motorbike racing on YouTube. It's either long-lens [close-up] cameras, very professional, or it's iPhone cameras from people in the crowd, cars passing by at the speed of light and they barely have a chance to pan and catch something."

Phil Neilson, who served as the stunt coordinator for the film, had previously worked on many films, including Ridley Scott's Gladiator. Jonathan Stamp, a historian who had consulted on the HBO/BBC series Rome, advised on the film's chariot design. He noted that the chariots in the 1959 film were unrealistically ornate. Filming for this particular scene lasted for 45 days in a span of three months. The inspiration for the use of minimal CGI for this sequence came from Hardcore Henry, on which Bekmambetov was a producer. Accidents were done with computer imagery. The two lead actors did much of their own riding, without harm.

Huston and Kebbell were asked if they wanted stunt doubles for their parts, and they declined.

A stuntman was thrown off from his chariot during filming, but suffered only mild injuries. Another stuntman was thrown from a chariot and run over by the wheel of another. He was later hospitalized and treated for bruised ribs. Bekmambetov said the authentic Roman costumes, with leather straps around the charioteer's chest, prevented that injury from being worse—though Daniel noted that every driver wore Kevlar underneath his costume.

== Music ==
=== Soundtrack ===
Ben-Hur – Songs Inspired by the Epic Film

Soundtrack album by Various Artists
- Released: 19 August 2016
- Recorded: 2016
- Genres: Soundtrack, Christian pop
- Length: 51:07
- Label: Word Entertainment
- Producer: Various Artists

Singles from Ben-Hur – Songs Inspired by the Epic Film
- 1. "The Only Way Out" Released: 2016

Ben-Hur – Songs Inspired by the Epic Film is the soundtrack of the film. It was released on August 19, 2016, by Word Entertainment.

==== Track listing ====
No.	Title	Performer(s)	Length
1.	"Amazing Grace"	Jordan Smith	4:23
2.	"Sisters & Brothers"	Sidewalk Prophets	3:28
3.	"When We Love"	Love & the Outcome	4:07
4.	"Let It Be Love"	Family Force 5	3:30
5.	"Ceasefire"	For King & Country	4:16
6.	"Surrender"	Blanca	4:02
7.	"Shadows"	We Are Messengers	3:07
8.	"Never Burn Out"	Stars Go Dim	3:54
9.	"Your Love Is Enough"	Jon Foreman	3:43
10.	"Drop Your Stone"	Chris August	4:10
11.	"If We're Honest"	Francesca Battistelli	3:09
12.	"Come Sit Down"	Big Daddy Weave	5:35
13.	"The Only Way Out"	Andra Day	3:43
Total length:			51:07

=== Score ===
Ben-Hur (Original Motion Picture Score)

Film score by Marco Beltrami
- Released: 5 August 2016
- Recorded: 2016
- Genre: Film score
- Length: 1:06:31
- Label: Sony Classical Records
- Producer: Marco Beltrami

Marco Beltrami film scores chronology
The Shallows (2016)	Ben-Hur (Original Motion Picture Score) (2016)	Anubis (2018)

Ben-Hur (Original Motion Picture Score) is the film score for Ben-Hur. All scores were composed and conducted by Marco Beltrami, with additional music by Brandon Roberts and additional conducting by Mark Graham. It was released on 5 August 2016 by Sony Classical Records.

==== Track listing ====
All music is composed by Marco Beltrami.

No.	Title	Length
1.	"Ben-Hur Theme"	2:52
2.	"Jerusalem 33 A.D. / Sibling Rivalry"	2:23
3.	"Carrying Judah"	1:57
4.	"Mother's Favorite"	1:21
5.	"Messala Leaves Home"	1:33
6.	"Dear Messala"	1:46
7.	"Messala Returns"	1:33
8.	"Speaking of Zealots"	1:27
9.	"Messala and Tirzah"	1:36
10.	"Brothers Divide"	1:40
11.	"Home Invasion"	4:41
12.	"Galley Slaves"	4:59
13.	"Rammed Hard"	2:18
14.	"Judah Ashore"	2:29
15.	"Horse Healer"	1:26
16.	"Ben and Esther"	1:38
17.	"Training"	3:19
18.	"Invitation"	1:16
19.	"Ilderim Wagers"	2:38
20.	"Leper Colony / Messala Will Pay"	3:04
21.	"The Circus"	2:39
22.	"Chariots of Fire"	4:17
23.	"Brother vs. Brother"	4:26
24.	"Carried Off"	1:22
25.	"Jesus Arrested"	3:10
26.	"Forgiveness"	1:51
27.	"Modeh Ani Haiku"	2:50
Total length:		1:06:31

== Release ==
Ben-Hur was originally scheduled to be released in the United States and Canada on February 26, 2016, but Paramount moved its release date to August 12, 2016. According to Variety, the decision to switch from February to August may have been due to the studio's faith in summer being the best time to release a tentpole epic. At the 2016 CinemaCon, Paramount again announced it was moving the release date to August 19, 2016, and scheduling Florence Foster Jenkins for August 12, when Pete's Dragon, Sausage Party, and Anthropoid were also scheduled to be released. It was released in the United Kingdom and Ireland on September 7.

Deadline Hollywood called the August date a prime time for the studio, after witnessing success with the releases of Mission: Impossible – Rogue Nation and Teenage Mutant Ninja Turtles during the month of August. Furthermore, the site highlighted that the 2016 Summer Olympics would be an ideal platform for the studio to promote the film, and that mid-August has proven to be the last point of time in the summer for a film to accrue a large amount of revenue, before weekend box office performances drop from the Labor Day holiday onwards. Ben-Hur is the third summer 2016 tentpole from Paramount Pictures, following Teenage Mutant Ninja Turtles: Out of the Shadows (3 June) and Star Trek Beyond (22 July). It was the last big-budget release of the summer movie season.

Ben-Hur was released in Malaysia on 15 September 2016. The film's release drew controversy, when some viewers complained that scenes depicting Jesus Christ had been cut out from the Malaysian theatrical version. The Malaysian Film Censorship Board's chairman, Datuk Abdul Halim Abdul Hamid, clarified that the Malaysian censors had not cut out scenes depicting Jesus from the film, but suggested that the film producers did cut out a few scenes to suit the sensitivities of certain markets. The film's Malaysian distributor, United International Pictures Malaysia, has since confirmed that the cuts were made to fulfil local legal requirements and guidelines.

=== Marketing ===
Two exclusive photos of the film were released by USA Today on March 14, 2016. On March 15, Entertainment Tonight released a world exclusive premiere of some of the scenes of the chariot race, and on the following day, the first official trailer was released online, along with a teaser poster.

The trailer was released a week after Paramount released 10 Cloverfield Lane in theaters. Although Paramount did not secure a Super Bowl commercial spot for the film, Scott Mendelson of Forbes felt that it was an appropriate film to advertise before Sony Pictures' faith-based Miracles from Heaven opened on March 16. The trailer garnered a polarized reception from critics and audiences, with comparisons being made to 300: Rise of an Empire, Gladiator, and Spartacus: Blood and Sand. In its first week, the trailer was viewed over 8.2 million times across YouTube and Facebook, making it the fourth most viewed trailer of the week. The trailer was also screened in front of over 30,000 people at Hillsong Conference 2016.

Jesus is in the film, which was used for some faith-based marketing to a Christian audience.

=== Home media ===
Ben-Hur was released on Digital HD on November 29, 2016 and on Blu-ray and DVD on December 13, 2016.

=== Video game ===
A free, promotional video game based on the film's chariot race sequence was released in 2016 for the Xbox One. The goal of the game is to win the races by being the first to complete all laps, or destroying all enemies. It includes a trailer for the movie as its starting cutscene. The game was met with negative reception and mostly ignored by mainstream outlets. We've Got This Covered's Tyler Treese gave the game a 1 out of 5, criticizing its minimalist gameplay.

== Reception ==
=== Box office ===
Ben-Hur was called by Hollywood observers the summer's biggest box office bomb, and one of the biggest flops of 2016. The film grossed $26.4 million in the United States and Canada and $67.7 million in other countries for a worldwide total of $94.1 million, against a production budget of $100 million. Due to its underperformance at the box office, executives at rival studios believe the film lost around $100–120 million theatrically. Sources close to the film, however, believe the ultimate losses were likely $60–75 million, noting the film could do well on DVD and other home entertainment platforms. The losses for MGM were heavier, since they financed 80% of the total production budget, including marketing expenses. As a result, Paramount's share of the loss was about $13 million. Sources at rival studios put the film's break even point at about $250 million globally.

The Hollywood Reporter placed Ben-Hur among the biggest summer box office risks of 2016, while Forbes deemed it "the summer's most predictable miss/catastrophe". In the United States and Canada, the film was projected to gross to about $15 million in its opening weekend, a disappointing figure considering its $100 million production cost. Due to a negative reception from critics and the influx of heavy competition, the re-opening of schools after summer vacation, and the final weekend of the Rio Summer Olympics, the film's opening expectations were lowered as its opening approached. It opened Friday, August 19, 2016, on around 3,300 screens across 3,084 theaters, and earned $4.1 million, including $900,000 it made from Thursday previews at 2,389 theaters. The film went on to gross a low $11.2 million in its opening weekend, even with 3D and IMAX bumps, finishing sixth at the box office and third among new releases, behind Kubo and the Two Strings and War Dogs. The film's opening weekend demographic was 51% female vs. 49% male, with 94% of the overall audience coming in over the age of 25.

Many box office critics and publications considered the film a box office bomb based on its opening alone. Jeff Bock, a box office analyst with Exhibitor Relations, called it "the bomb of the summer." Critics pointed out that a lack of star power, its August release date, competition, negative reviews (both from critics and audiences), and a lack of marketing, were potential causes for the film's underperformance. According to Variety, the film was unable to expand beyond its core Christian audience. It performed well in areas of the US that are more religious, but did not do as well in more secular regions of the country. As a result of its poor opening, Ben-Hur joined various other films set in ancient times to underperform at the box office, especially recent big-budget movies from major studios – Exodus: Gods and Kings (2014), The Legend of Hercules (2014), and Gods of Egypt (2016).

Ben-Hur depended heavily on foreign markets, especially in Christian offshore territories, such as Latin America, in order to pass its break even point and to recoup its production budget (including marketing expenses). Outside North America, Ben-Hur grossed $10.7 million in its opening weekend from 23 international markets (18 territories released by Paramount and 5 by MGM). It had No. 1 openings in certain markets like Mexico, the Philippines, India, Peru, Russia, France, and Bulgaria. Its top openings were in Mexico ($2.7 million), Russia ($2.3 million), Brazil ($2.2 million), the United Kingdom ($1.5 million), France ($1.2 million), and Spain ($1.1 million). In the United Kingdom and Ireland, the film earned £265,000 in Wednesday and Thursday previews and through Sunday, and had a total opening of £1.05 million from 509 theaters. It debuted in second place behind the animated Sausage Party, after stiff competition from the horror film Don't Breathe, for the second spot. Minus previews, it earned £783,000 from Friday to Sunday alone, which placed the film at number five on the chart.

It opened in South Korea on September 14, and delivered a robust 5-day opening worth $6.69 million from 707 theaters. It finished in first place among Hollywood films (ahead of The Magnificent Seven), and in second place overall behind local film The Age of Shadows. Although it fell to second place in its sophomore weekend, it managed to fend off newcomers The Magnificent Seven and I Am a Hero, and grossed a total of $8.8 million there. It opened in China—then the world's second biggest movie market—on October 10, and delivered a paltry $2.51 million in its opening weekend. However, this is reflective of a seven days total as it opened on a Monday. Based on Friday to Sunday alone, the total was just $460,000, managing to debut at number ten.

In terms of total earnings, South Korea ($8.8 million), Mexico ($6 million), and Brazil ($5.5 million) were its top markets. The film's opening date in its final market, Japan, was February 8, 2017.

=== Critical response ===
On the review aggregator website Rotten Tomatoes, 25% of 187 critics' reviews are positive, with an average rating of 4.6/10. The website's consensus reads: "How do you fight an idea? By filming a remake that has too few of its own, and tries to cover it up with choppy editing and CGI." Metacritic, which uses a weighted average, assigned the film a score of 38 out of 100, based on 34 critics, indicating "generally unfavorable" reviews. Audiences polled by CinemaScore gave the film an average grade of "A−" on an A+ to F scale.

The A.V. Club's Ignatiy Vishnevetsky, giving one of the few positive-leaning reviews, wrote: "At first, the new adaptation of Lew Wallace's New Testament soap opera seems impersonal, as dusty and ornamented as any movie in which robed Jews and Romans argue about gods and kings in accents of vaguely British origin", but as it progresses, "Ben-Hur announces itself as the sort of elemental re-imagining of the source material that no one in their right mind would ever expect it to be." IGN's Scott Collura gave the film 5.8/10, writing: "Ben-Hur is an adequate introduction to the classic tale of revenge and forgiveness, but it's an uneven one. Toby Kebbell's antagonist character frequently outweighs the appeal of Jack Huston's hero, the more religious elements of the story don't jell very well with the action set pieces, and much of the cast are left behind by their own movie. But still, there's no denying the power of Ben-Hur's final redemption. It's just not a very smooth ride getting there."

The New York Times' Stephen Holden wrote, "Overseen by a director not known for his human touch and lacking a name star, except for Mr. Freeman, Ben-Hur feels like a film made on the cheap, although it looks costly." Richard Roeper gave the film two stars out of four, writing: "Ben-Hur struggles to find an identity and never really gets there. The well-intentioned efforts to achieve moving, faith-based awakenings are undercut by the casually violent, PG-13 action sequences." The Hollywood Reporter's Todd McCarthy described the film's chariot race scene as being "heavily digitized and over-edited", and called it the worst scene of the film he described as "Misguided, diminished and dismally done in every way".

Rolling Stone labeled the film "A Remake Disaster of Biblical Proportions." Empire summarized it as "passable for the most part, but laughably inept in places."

Sister Rose Pacatte wrote a positive review for the National Catholic Reporter, objecting only to the anachronistic costumes worn by Jewish women in the film.

=== Accolades ===
Award	Category	Subject	Result
EDA Special Mention Award	Sequel or Remake That Shouldn't Have Been Made	—N/a	Won
Yoga Award	Worst Remake	Timur Bekmambetov	Won

=== American Federation of Musicians v. Paramount Pictures ===
In April 2015, the American Federation of Musicians of the United States and Canada filed a lawsuit against MGM and Paramount Pictures, with the federation accusing the studios of not paying proper wages, benefits and residual compensation to the hired musicians working on the film.

== See also ==
- List of films featuring slavery
