= West North Central states =

Group of states in the Central North-western part of the US

West North Central
- Region
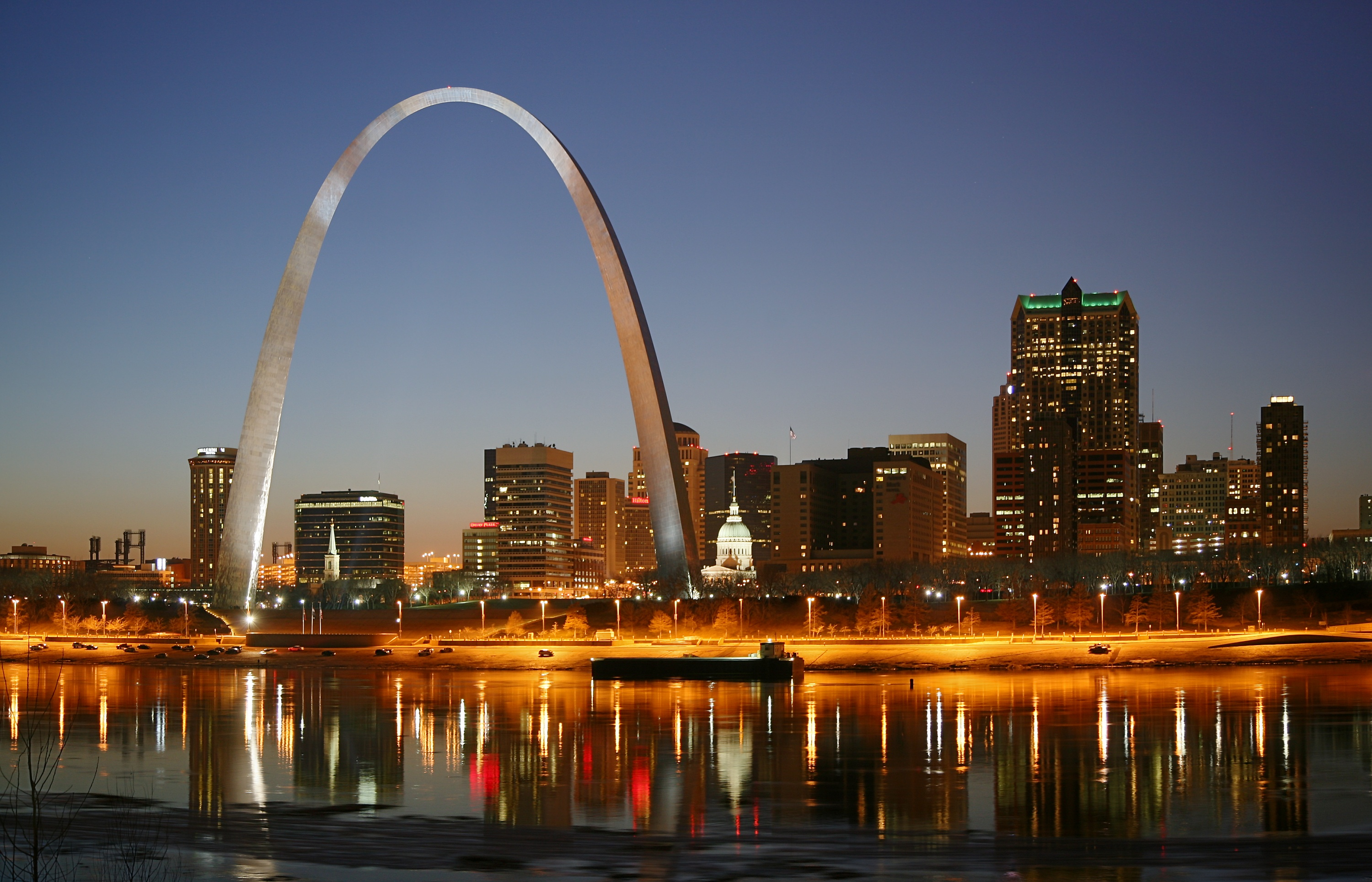
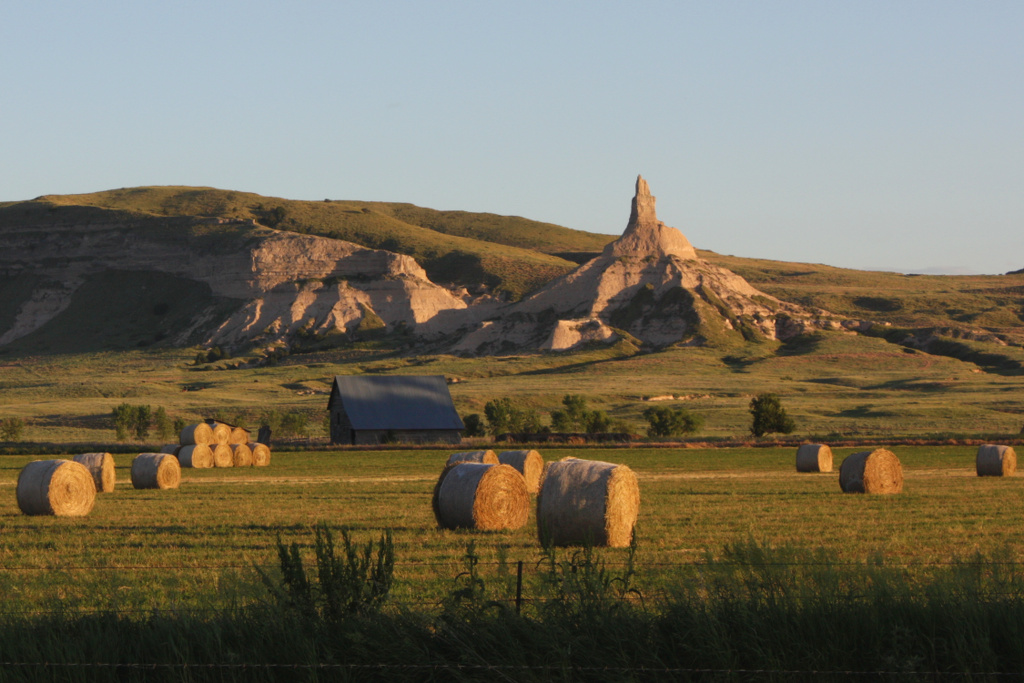
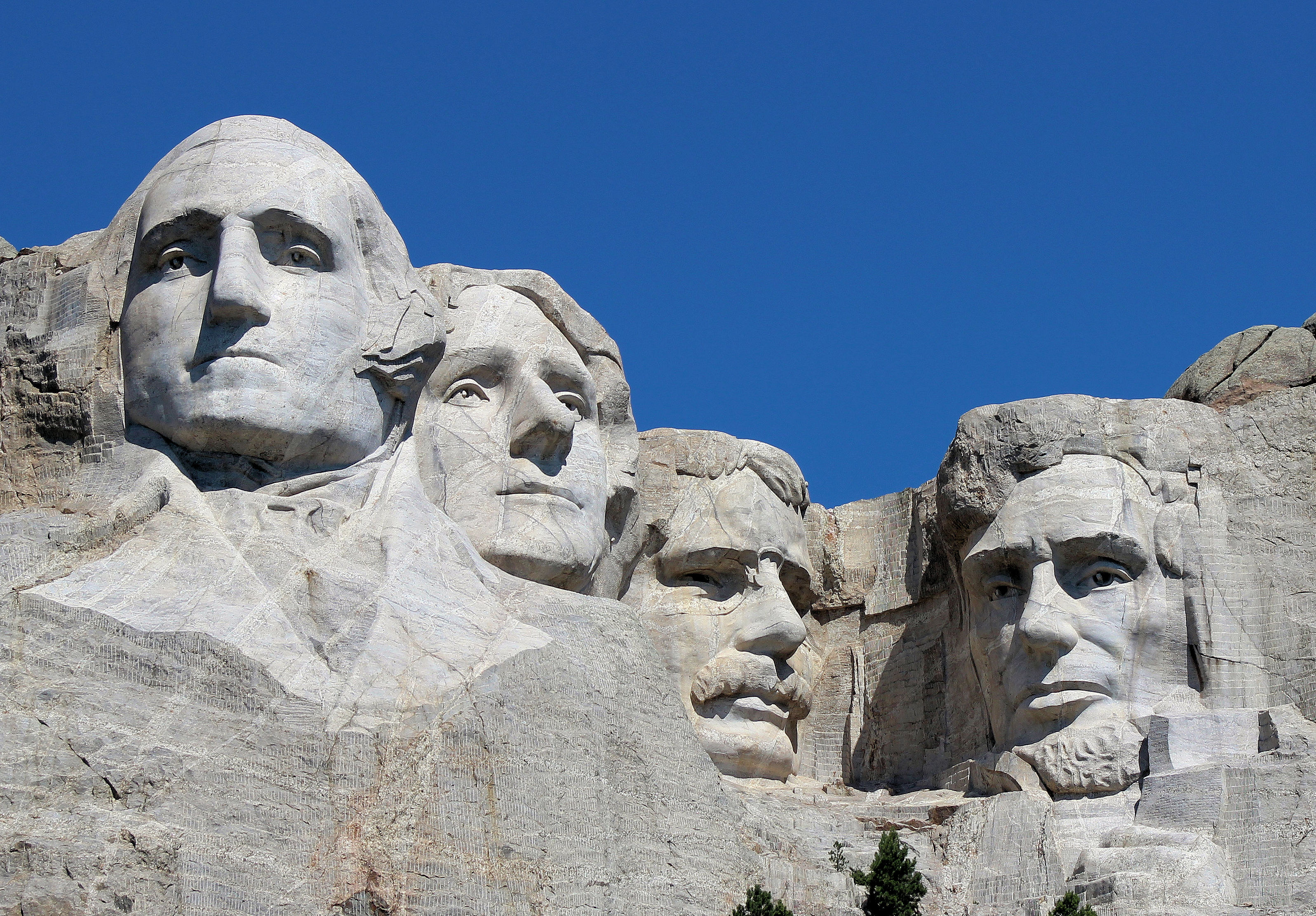
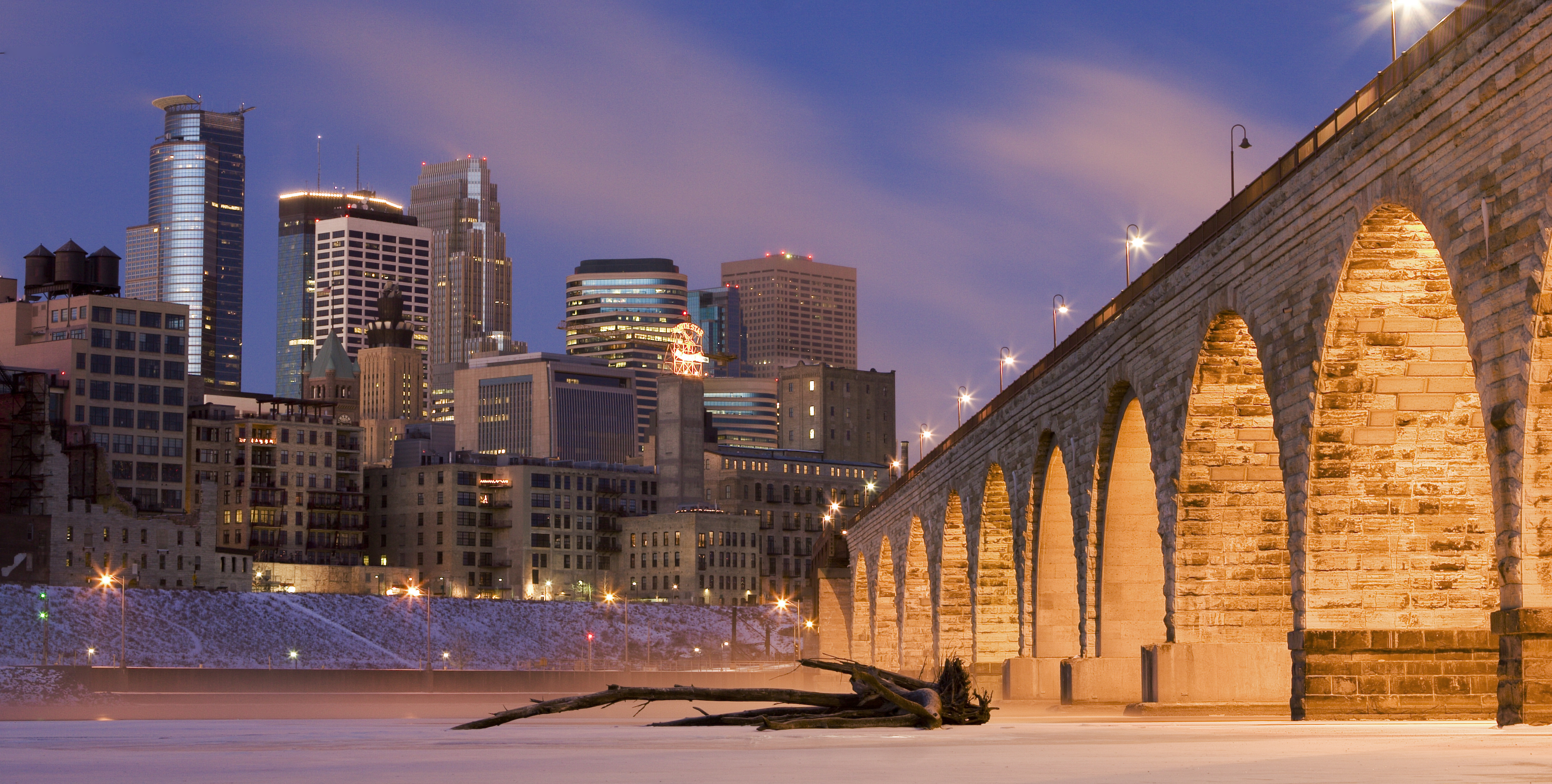
- St. Louis and the Gateway Arch American Gothic House Chimney Rock Mount Rushmore Painted Canyon Monroe Elementary School Minneapolis

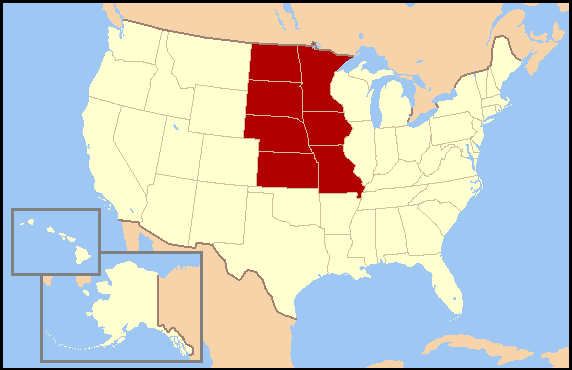
- Composition: Iowa; Kansas; Minnesota; Missouri; Nebraska; North Dakota; South Dakota
- Metropolitan areas: Twin Cities, MN; Duluth, MN; St. Louis, MO; Kansas City, MO; Omaha, NE; Lincoln, NE; Wichita, KS; Topeka, KS; Des Moines, IA; Davenport, IA; Sioux Falls, SD; Rapid City, SD; Fargo, ND; Bismarck, ND
- Largest city: Kansas City

Area
  - Total: 507,913 sq mi (1,315,490 km^{2})

Population (2020)
  - Total: 21,616,921
  - Density: 42.5603/sq mi (16.4326/km^{2})

The West North Central states form one of the nine geographic subdivisions within the United States that are officially recognized by the U.S. Census Bureau.

Seven states compose the division: Iowa, Kansas, Minnesota, Missouri, Nebraska, North Dakota and South Dakota and it makes up the western half of the Midwestern United States; the eastern half of which consists of the East North Central states of Illinois, Indiana, Michigan, Ohio and Wisconsin. The Mississippi River marks the bulk of the boundary between these two divisions.

The West North Central states are regarded as constituting the core of the nation's "Farm Belt." Other names applied to this region are the "Great Plains States", the "Agricultural Heartland," or simply the "Heartland".

Since the early 1990s, the West North Central division has consistently had the lowest unemployment rate in the United States (especially in its many college towns), and has also been noted for its plentiful supply of affordable housing.

== Demographics ==
As of 2020, the West North Central states had a combined population of 21,616,921. This number is a 5.4% increase from 20,505,437 in 2010. The West North Central region covers 507,913 square miles (1,315,489 km^{2}) of land, and has an average population density of 42.56 people per square mile.

States in the West North Central
State	2020 census	Land area
Iowa	3,190,369	56,272
Kansas	2,937,880	82,277
Minnesota	5,706,494	86,939
Missouri	6,154,913	69,709
Nebraska	1,961,504	77,354
North Dakota	779,094	70,700
South Dakota	886,667	77,116

Ten largest cities by population in the West North Central
	City	2020 pop.
1	Kansas City, Missouri	508,090
2	Omaha, Nebraska	484,983
3	Minneapolis, Minnesota	434,341
4	Wichita, Kansas	390,780
5	St. Louis, Missouri	318,416
6	St. Paul, Minnesota	310,468
7	St. Louis, Missouri	292,601
8	Lincoln, Nebraska	292,201
9	Des Moines, Iowa	215,293
10	Overland Park, Kansas	197,783

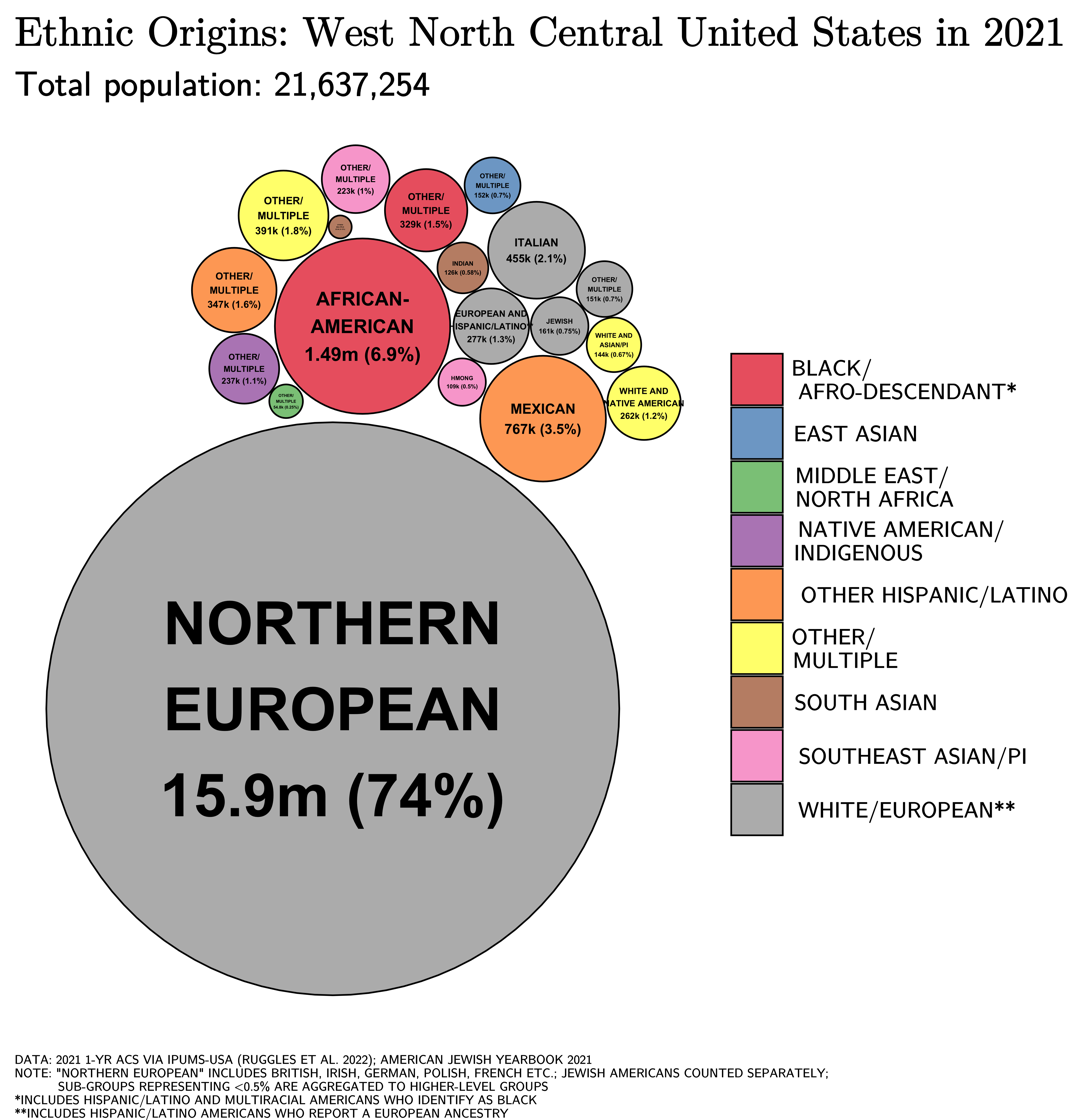
Ethnic origins in West North Central

Largest metropolitan areas (2020)
1	Twin Cities (MN-WI)	3,685,561
2	St. Louis, MO-IL	2,806,100
3	Kansas City, Missouri-KS	2,172,902
4	Omaha, Nebraska-IA	963,221
5	Des Moines, Iowa	721,326
6	Wichita, Kansas	649,230
7	Springfield, Missouri	473,702
8	Quad Cities IA-IL (Davenport)	376,502
9	Lincoln, Nebraska	340,954
10	Duluth, MN-WI	287,430

== Politics ==
Kansas, Nebraska, South Dakota, and North Dakota have consistently voted for Republican presidential candidates since 1968. Minnesota has consistently voted for Democratic presidential candidates since 1976. Missouri has consistently voted for Republican presidential candidates since 2000. Iowa voted for Trump in 2016 and 2020, but previously voted for Democratic presidential candidates from 2012 to 1988, except in 2004 when it voted for George W. Bush.

Parties
Democratic-Republican	Democratic	Republican	Liberal Republican	Populist	Progressive

- **Bold** denotes election winner.

Presidential electoral votes in the West North Central states since 1824
Year	Iowa	Kansas	Minnesota	Missouri	Nebraska	North Dakota	South Dakota
1824	No election	No election	No election	Clay	No election	No election	No election
1828	No election	No election	No election	**Jackson**	No election	No election	No election
1832	No election	No election	No election	**Jackson**	No election	No election	No election
1836	No election	No election	No election	**Van Buren**	No election	No election	No election
1840	No election	No election	No election	Van Buren	No election	No election	No election
1844	No election	No election	No election	**Polk**	No election	No election	No election
1848	Cass	No election	No election	Cass	No election	No election	No election
1852	**Pierce**	No election	No election	**Pierce**	No election	No election	No election
1856	Frémont	No election	No election	**Buchanan**	No election	No election	No election
1860	**Lincoln**	No election	**Lincoln**	Douglas	No election	No election	No election
1864	**Lincoln**	**Lincoln**	**Lincoln**	**Lincoln**	No election	No election	No election
1868	**Grant**	**Grant**	**Grant**	**Grant**	**Grant**	No election	No election
1872	**Grant**	**Grant**	**Grant**	Brown	**Grant**	No election	No election
1876	**Hayes**	**Hayes**	**Hayes**	Tilden	**Hayes**	No election	No election
1880	**Garfield**	**Garfield**	**Garfield**	Hancock	**Garfield**	No election	No election
1884	Blaine	Blaine	Blaine	**Cleveland**	Blaine	No election	No election
1888	**Harrison**	**Harrison**	**Harrison**	Cleveland	**Harrison**	No election	No election
1892	Harrison	Weaver	Harrison	**Cleveland**	Harrison	Weaver	Harrison
1896	**McKinley**	Bryan	**McKinley**	Bryan	Bryan	**McKinley**	Bryan
1900	**McKinley**	**McKinley**	**McKinley**	Bryan	**McKinley**	**McKinley**	**McKinley**
1904	**Roosevelt**	**Roosevelt**	**Roosevelt**	**Roosevelt**	**Roosevelt**	**Roosevelt**	**Roosevelt**
1908	**Taft**	**Taft**	**Taft**	**Taft**	Bryan	**Taft**	**Taft**
1912	**Wilson**	**Wilson**	Roosevelt	**Wilson**	**Wilson**	**Wilson**	Roosevelt
1916	Hughes	**Wilson**	Hughes	**Wilson**	**Wilson**	**Wilson**	Hughes
1920	**Harding**	**Harding**	**Harding**	**Harding**	**Harding**	**Harding**	**Harding**
1924	**Coolidge**	**Coolidge**	**Coolidge**	**Coolidge**	**Coolidge**	**Coolidge**	**Coolidge**
1928	**Hoover**	**Hoover**	**Hoover**	**Hoover**	**Hoover**	**Hoover**	**Hoover**
1932	**Roosevelt**	**Roosevelt**	**Roosevelt**	**Roosevelt**	**Roosevelt**	**Roosevelt**	**Roosevelt**
1936	**Roosevelt**	**Roosevelt**	**Roosevelt**	**Roosevelt**	**Roosevelt**	**Roosevelt**	**Roosevelt**
1940	Willkie	Willkie	**Roosevelt**	**Roosevelt**	Willkie	Willkie	Willkie
1944	Dewey	Dewey	**Roosevelt**	**Roosevelt**	Dewey	Dewey	Dewey
1948	**Truman**	Dewey	**Truman**	**Truman**	Dewey	Dewey	Dewey
1952	**Eisenhower**	**Eisenhower**	**Eisenhower**	**Eisenhower**	**Eisenhower**	**Eisenhower**	**Eisenhower**
1956	**Eisenhower**	**Eisenhower**	**Eisenhower**	Stevenson	**Eisenhower**	**Eisenhower**	**Eisenhower**
1960	Nixon	Nixon	**Kennedy**	**Kennedy**	Nixon	Nixon	Nixon
1964	**Johnson**	**Johnson**	**Johnson**	**Johnson**	**Johnson**	**Johnson**	**Johnson**
1968	**Nixon**	**Nixon**	Humphrey	**Nixon**	**Nixon**	**Nixon**	**Nixon**
1972	**Nixon**	**Nixon**	**Nixon**	**Nixon**	**Nixon**	**Nixon**	**Nixon**
1976	Ford	Ford	**Carter**	**Carter**	Ford	Ford	Ford
1980	**Reagan**	**Reagan**	Carter	**Reagan**	**Reagan**	**Reagan**	**Reagan**
1984	**Reagan**	**Reagan**	Mondale	**Reagan**	**Reagan**	**Reagan**	**Reagan**
1988	Dukakis	**Bush**	Dukakis	**Bush**	**Bush**	**Bush**	**Bush**
1992	**Clinton**	Bush	**Clinton**	**Clinton**	Bush	Bush	Bush
1996	**Clinton**	Dole	**Clinton**	**Clinton**	Dole	Dole	Dole
2000	Gore	**Bush**	Gore	**Bush**	**Bush**	**Bush**	**Bush**
2004	**Bush**	**Bush**	Kerry	**Bush**	**Bush**	**Bush**	**Bush**
2008	**Obama**	McCain	**Obama**	McCain	McCain^{[†]}	McCain	McCain
2012	**Obama**	Romney	**Obama**	Romney	Romney	Romney	Romney
2016	**Trump**	**Trump**	Clinton	**Trump**	**Trump**	**Trump**	**Trump**
2020	Trump	Trump	**Biden**	Trump	Trump^{[†]}	Trump	Trump
2024	**Trump**	**Trump**	Harris	**Trump**	**Trump**^{[†]}	**Trump**	**Trump**
Year	Iowa	Kansas	Minnesota	Missouri	Nebraska	North Dakota	South Dakota

== See also ==
- Great Plains

== Notes ==
^{†} McCain and Trump won the overall state, but Barack Obama won Nebraska's 2nd congressional district in the 2008 election, while Joe Biden won it in the 2020 election and Kamala Harris won it in the 2024 election.
