= Lincoln metropolitan area =

The Lincoln metropolitan area may refer to:

- The Lincoln, Nebraska metropolitan area, United States
- The Lincoln, Illinois micropolitan area, United States

== See also ==
- Lincoln (disambiguation)
