= Rose Pacatte =

American film critic

Sister Rose Pacatte, FSP, is an American film critic and Catholic nun.

In 1967, at age 15, Pacatte entered the Daughters of St. Paul, an order which conducts religious outreach through mass media. She earned an M.Ed in media studies from the University of London's Institute of Education in 1995 and a doctorate in ministry from the Graduate Theological Foundation in 2018. Her doctoral project was an undergraduate film textbook entitled To Seek God's Face: Theological Approaches to Film.

Pacatte is the founding director of the Pauline Center for Media Studies. She has been the resident film critic for the St. Anthony Messenger since 2003 and for the National Catholic Reporter since 2008, reviewing mainstream, independent, and faith-based titles. She has sat on ecumenical juries at the Berlin, Locarno, and Cannes film festivals and on the SIGNIS independent jury at Venice. In 2015, she presented the inaugural "Redeemer" award at the Razzies parody award show. In 2016, she hosted a series of classic films condemned by the National Legion of Decency on Turner Classic Movies.
