= Painted Canyon =

Valley in North Dakota, United States

Coordinates: 46°54′01″N 103°22′29″W

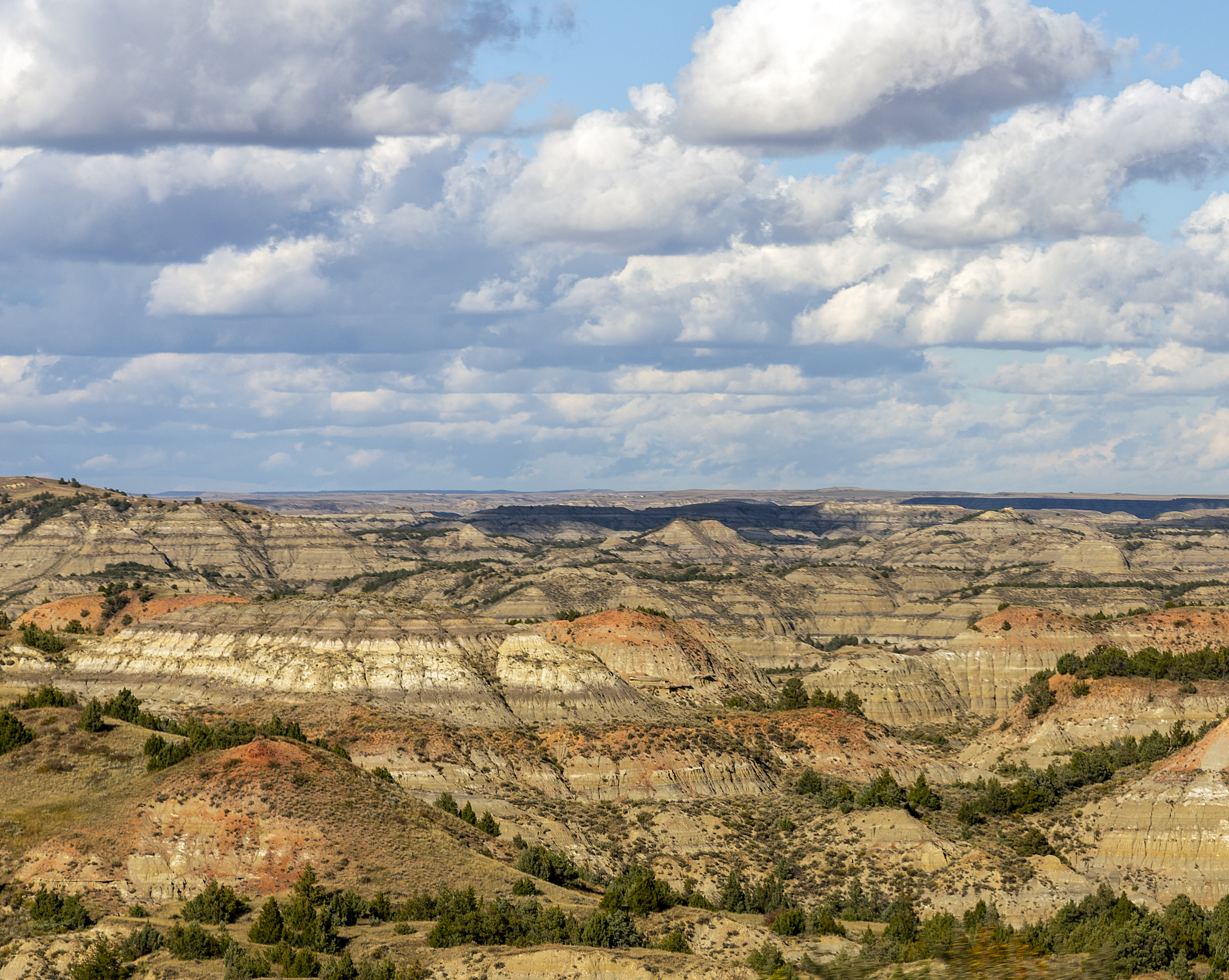
- The Painted Canyon, as viewed from I-94 in Theodore Roosevelt National Park

- Location within North Dakota Location within the United States Location within North America

Geography
- Location: Theodore Roosevelt National Park, North Dakota
- Interactive map of Painted Canyon

Painted Canyon is a valley in Billings County, North Dakota, in the United States. It is part of the Theodore Roosevelt National Park.

Painted Canyon was so named on account of its colorful rocks.

== Water-supply well ==
There is a 588-metre water-supply well located at the Painted Canyon Overlook, which has a specific capacity of about 0.4 gallons per minute per foot. Hiking trails are available from the overlook.
