= List of drama films of the 1910s =

This is a list of drama films of the 1910s.

== 1910 ==
- The Abyss
- The Actor's Children
- All on Account of the Milk
- The American and the Queen
- An Arcadian Maid
- Arsène Lupin contra Sherlock Holmes
- Avenged
- The Best Man Wins
- The Bravest Girl of the South
- The Broken Oath
- The Castaways
- A Christmas Carol
- The Conspiracy of Pontiac
- Cupid at the Circus
- A Dainty Politician
- The Doctor's Carriage
- The Fisherman's Granddaughter
- The Flag of His Country
- The Fugitive
- The Further Adventures of the Girl Spy
- The Girl Strike Leader
- The Girl Spy Before Vicksburg
- The Governor's Daughter
- Grandmother's War Story
- Her Soldier Sweetheart
- The House with Closed Shutters
- Hypnotized
- In the Border States
- In Old California
- Jane Eyre
- Jean and the Calico Doll
- John Halifax, Gentleman
- The Kid
- King Lear
- The Lad from Old Ireland
- Lena Rivers
- The Little Hero of Holland
- The Little Spreewald Maiden
- Looking Forward
- The Lucky Shot
- The Man Who Lost
- The Millionaire Milkman
- The Miser's Child
- Mistress and Maid
- Mother
- The Navajo's Bride
- Not Guilty
- The Perversity of Fate
- The Picture of Dorian Gray
- The Playwright's Love
- Ramona
- The Restoration
- Rip Van Winkle
- The Seminole Halfbreeds
- The Seminole's Trust
- She Stoops to Conquer
- The Stranger (1910 film)
- The Unchanging Sea
- Uncle Tom's Cabin
- The Woman Hater (Thanhouser Company)
- The Writing on the Wall
- Young Lord Stanley

== 1911 ==
- Adrift
- The Battle
- Behind the Stockade
- Brown of Harvard
- The Buddhist Priestess
- Cally's Comet
- The Colonel and the King
- The Colonel's Son
- David Copperfield
- Enoch Arden
- Flames and Fortune
- For Her Sake
- For the Love of an Enemy
- For Washington
- Henry VIII
- Her Awakening
- The Higher Law
- His Trust
- His Trust Fulfilled
- The Hunchback of Notre Dame
- L'Inferno
- In Blossom Time
- The Lighthouse by the Sea
- The Lonedale Operator
- The Military Air-Scout
- The Miser's Heart
- The New Superintendent
- The Norwood Necklace
- The Old Curiosity Shop
- The Open Road
- The Pasha's Daughter
- The Railroad Builder
- The Railroad Raiders of '62
- Rory O'More
- The Scarlet Letter
- The Secret of the Still
- Silver Threads Among the Gold
- The Smuggler
- Stage Struck
- The Stuff Heroes Are Made Of
- Sweet Memories
- A Tale of Two Cities
- Tangled Lives
- That's Happiness
- The Tempest
- Through Darkened Vales
- The Two Paths
- The Voice of the Child
- The Vote That Counted
- What Shall We Do with Our Old?
- A Woman Scorned

== 1912 ==
- Aurora Floyd
- Baby Hands
- A Battle of Wits
- Brutality
- The Burglar's Dilemma
- The County Fair
- A Cry for Help
- The Deserter
- From the Manger to the Cross
- The God Within
- Gold and Glitter
- Heredity
- In the Aisles of the Wild
- In Nacht und Eis
- The Informer
- It Happened Thus
- The Land Beyond the Sunset
- The Little Girl Next Door
- Maud Muller
- The Musketeers of Pig Alley
- A New Cure for Divorce
- The New York Hat
- The Painted Lady
- Please Help the Pore
- The Power of Melody
- A Primitive Man's Career to Civilization
- Put Yourself in His Place
- Richard III
- Saved from the Titanic
- The Street Singer
- The Tell-Tale Message
- The Thunderbolt
- Two Daughters of Eve
- The Voice of Conscience
- The Young Millionaire

== 1914 ==
- The Mother and the Law
- The Squaw Man
- What's His Name
- Zijn viool

== 1915 ==
- $1,000 Reward
- The Ambition of the Baron
- Anna Karenina
- The Beachcomber
- The Birth of a Nation
- The Boss
- The Bottle
- Camille
- Carmen - Raoul Walsh film
- Carmen - Cecil B. DeMille film
- The Case of Becky
- Coals of Fire
- The Devil
- The Devil's Daughter
- The Edge of the Abyss
- Esmeralda
- The Eternal City
- A Fool There Was
- From Shopgirl to Duchess
- Gladiola (film)
- The Goose Girl
- Home
- The House of the Lost Court
- The Immigrant (1915 film)
- Jane Shore
- Lady Audley's Secret
- The Lily and the Rose
- Madame Butterfly
- Martyrs of the Alamo
- The Moonstone
- The Picture of Dorian Gray (1915 film)
- Rags
- Samson
- The Second in Command
- The Star of the Sea
- Steady Company
- The Threads of Fate
- The Trust
- Truth Stranger Than Fiction
- The White Sister

== 1916 ==
- The Abandonment
- The Almighty Dollar
- Audrey
- Behind the Lines
- The Blacklist
- The Brand of Cowardice
- The Call of the Cumberlands
- The Chance of a Lifetime
- The City
- The Code of Marcia Gray
- David Garrick
- The Devil's Own
- Diplomacy
- Disraeli
- Dr. Wake's Patient
- Driven
- East Is East
- The Evil Thereof
- The Gamble
- The Gilded Cage
- Guilty
- Intolerance
- The Intrigue
- The King's Daughter
- Kiss of Death
- The Lash
- Lights of New York
- The Little Damozel
- The Lyons Mail
- The Making of Maddalena
- Playing with Fire
- Public Opinion
- The Queen of Spades
- The Rise of Susan
- The Road to Love
- Romeo and Juliet (1916 Fox film)
- Romeo and Juliet (1916 Metro Pictures film)
- Secret Love
- The Selfish Woman
- The Serpent
- Seven Keys to Baldpate
- Sherlock Holmes
- Shoes
- Slander
- The Soul Market
- Sparrows
- The Spider
- The Stepping Stone
- The Storm
- Stranded
- The Stronger Love
- Tales of Hoffmann
- Therèse
- The Thoroughbred
- Under Cover
- Under Two Flags
- The Velvet Paw
- The Vicar of Wakefield
- The Victim
- Where Are My Children?
- The Yellow Passport

== 1917 ==
- The Auction Block
- Berg-Ejvind och hans hustru
- Camille
- The Climber
- The Crisis
- Culprit
- Daughter of Destiny
- The Debt
- Dombey and Son
- Enlighten Thy Daughter
- Eternal Love
- The Evil Eye
- Freckles
- Great Expectations
- The Happy Warrior
- Heart and Soul
- The Hostage
- The House Opposite
- If Thou Wert Blind
- Iracema
- The Jury of Fate
- Life Is a Dream
- A Little Princess
- Little Women
- The Lost Chord
- Love Letters
- The Mirror
- The Mortal Sin
- Nina, the Flower Girl
- Outcast
- Pardners
- Poppy
- Queen X
- Redemption
- Reputation
- The Rescue
- The Slave
- The Spendthrift
- A Tale of Two Cities
- Thais
- The Tiger Woman

== 1918 ==
- Anna Karenina
- The Bells
- Brown of Harvard
- By Right of Purchase
- Carmen
- The Crusaders
- The Danger Mark
- A Daughter of the Old South
- Daybreak
- A Doll's House
- The Elder Miss Blossom
- Eye for Eye
- The Family Skeleton
- The Firefly of France
- The Glorious Adventure
- The Great Adventure
- The Guilty Man
- The Hanging Judge
- Her Final Reckoning
- The Hidden Pearls
- The Hunter of Fall
- I Love You
- Just a Woman
- The Kaiser's Shadow
- Kildare of Storm
- The Law of the North
- Lest We Forget
- The Lie
- Madame Jealousy
- The Married Virgin
- Nine-Tenths of the Law
- The Panther Woman
- The Picture of Dorian Gray

== 1919 ==
- After Many Days
- The Avalanche
- Ave Caesar!
- Blind Husbands
- Bolshevism on Trial
- The Boy in Blue
- Broken in the Wars
- The Career of Katherine Bush
- Come Out of the Kitchen
- The Courageous Coward
- The End of the Road
- Eve in Exile
- Everywoman
- Eyes of Youth
- The Face at the Window
- The Final Close-Up
- Flame of the Desert
- For Better, for Worse
- Forbidden
- The Garden of Resurrection
- The Great Air Robbery
- The Grim Game
- Harakiri
- His Dearest Possession
- Human Desire
- Intoxication
- J'accuse
- The Jewess of Toledo
- Keeper of the Door
- The Lady Clare
- The Lion's Den
- Mr. Wu
- The Mystery of the Yellow Room
- The Nature of the Beast
- The New Moon
- Open Your Eyes
- The Other Half
- Paid in Full
- The Rocks of Valpre
- Rose Bernd
- Secret Service
- Sir Arne's Treasure
- Soldiers of Fortune
- The Splendid Romance
- Thin Ice
- Under Suspicion
- What Every Woman Wants
- The Woman Next Door
- A Society Exile
- The World and Its Woman
- You Never Saw Such a Girl
