= The Lady Peggy's Escape =

Lady Peggy's Escape
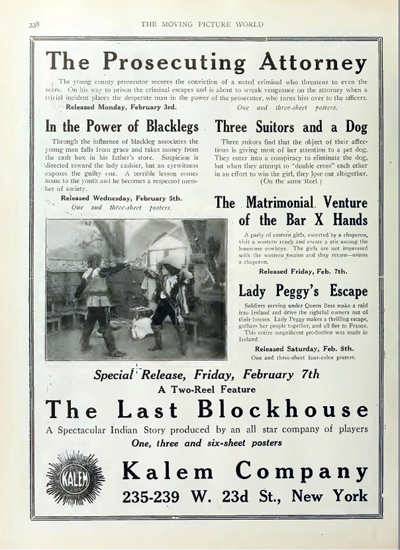
- Advertising published by The Moving Picture World, Vol 15, p 338.
- Directed by: Sidney Olcott
- Written by: Gene Gauntier
- Produced by: Kalem Company
- Starring: Gene Gauntier; Jack J. Clark; Sidney Olcott
- Cinematography: George K. Hollister
- Distributed by: General Film Company
- Release date: February 8, 1913
- Running time: 1000 ft
- Country: United States
- Languages: Silent film (English intertitles)

Lady Peggy's Escape is a 1913 American silent film produced by Kalem Company and distributed by General Film Company. It was directed by Sidney Olcott with himself, Gene Gauntier, Helen Lindroth and Jack J. Clark in the leading roles.

== Cast ==
- Gene Gauntier as Lady Peggy
- Jack J. Clark as Bedloe, a soldier
- Helen Lindroth as Lady Fitzgerald, Peggy's mother
- Robert Vignola as Preston, a soldier
- Sidney Olcott as Father O'Donnell

== Production ==
- The film was shot in Beaufort, County Kerry, Ireland, during the summer of 1912.
