= The Wives of Jamestown =

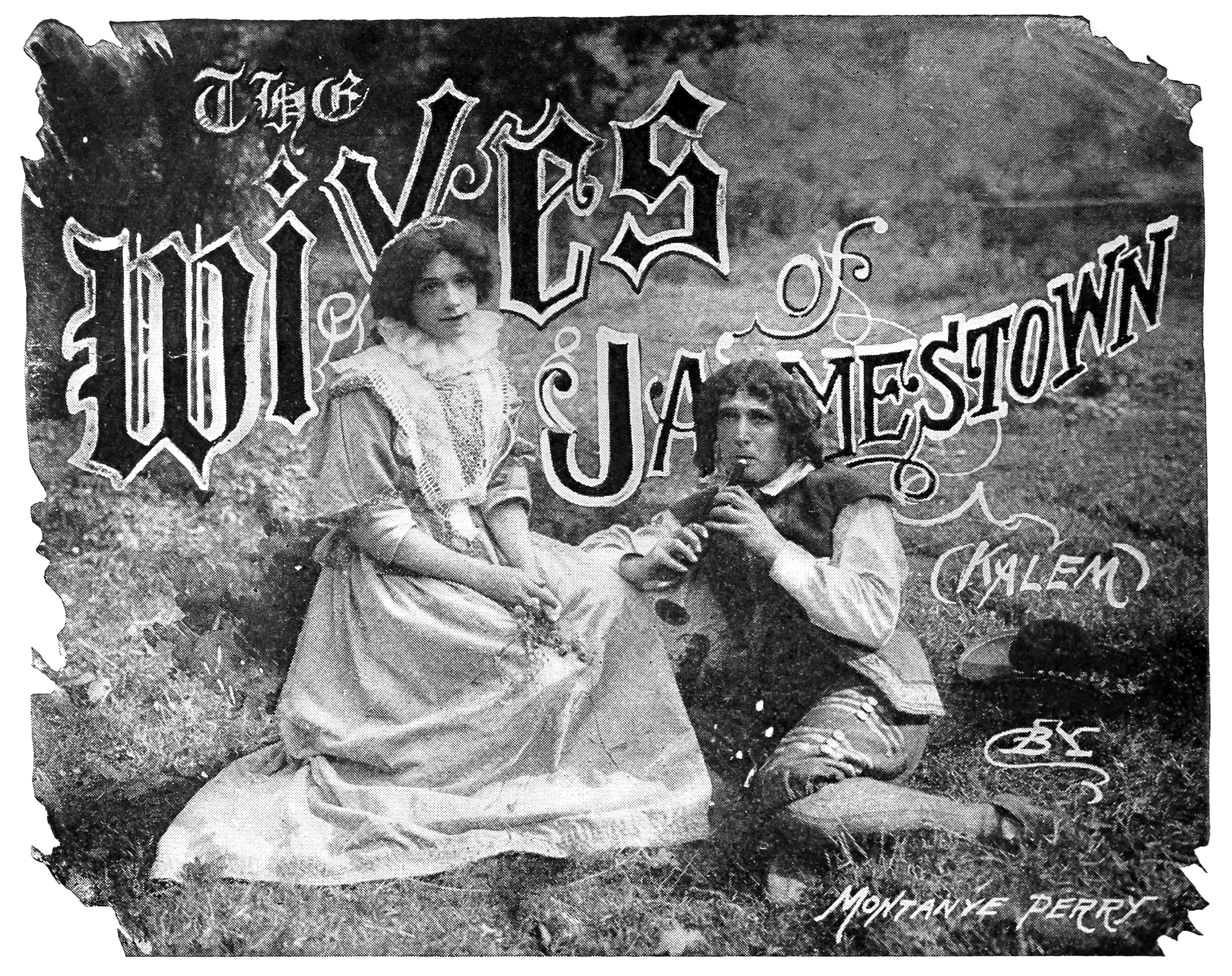
- Gene Gauntier and Jack J. Clark in The Wives of Jamestown
- Directed by: Sidney Olcott
- Written by: Gene Gauntier
- Starring: Gene Gauntier; Jack J. Clark; Helen Lindroth
- Cinematography: George K. Hollister
- Production company: Kalem Company
- Distributed by: General Film Company
- Release date: January 10, 1913
- Running time: 1823 ft
- Country: United States
- Languages: Silent film (English intertitles)

The Wives of Jamestown is a 1913 American silent film produced by the Kalem Company and distributed by the General Film Company. It was directed by Sidney Olcott with Gene Gauntier, Helen Lindroth and Jack J. Clark in the leading roles.

== Cast ==
- Gene Gauntier as Lady Geraldine
- Helen Lindroth as Anne McCarthy
- Jack J. Clark as Bryan O'Sullivan/John Pierce
- J. P. McGowan as The O'Rourke
- Robert Vignola as Shamus O'Daly

== Production ==
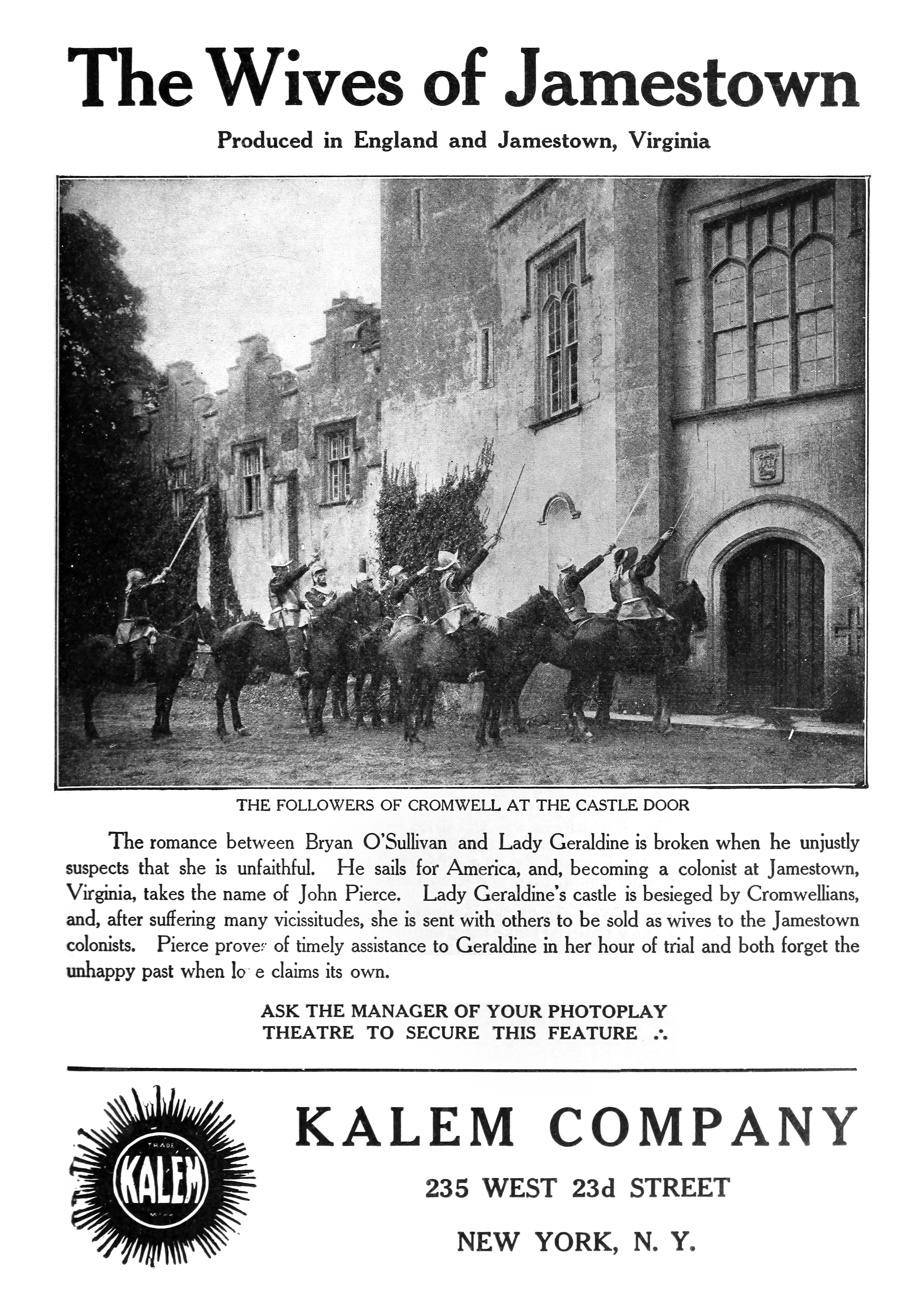
Advertisement in The Moving Picture Story Magazine (February 1913)

The film was shot in Beaufort, County Kerry, Ireland, and in Norfolk, Virginia, during the summer of 1912.

== See also ==
- Tobacco brides
- Ancient planter
