= A Sawmill Hero =

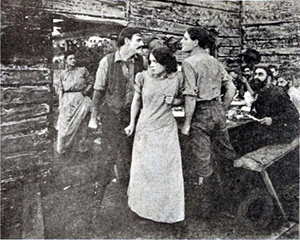
- Gene Gauntier (center) and Jack J. Clark (right)
- Directed by: Sidney Olcott
- Produced by: Sidney Olcott
- Starring: Gene Gauntier; Jack J. Clark
- Cinematography: George K. Hollister
- Production company: Kalem Company
- Distributed by: General Film Company
- Release date: February 22, 1911
- Running time: 975 ft
- Country: United States
- Languages: Silent film (English intertitles)

A Sawmill Hero is a 1911 American silent drama film produced by Kalem Company and directed by Sidney Olcott with Gene Gauntier and Jack J. Clark in the leading role.

== Cast ==
- Gene Gauntier - Jennie
- Jack J. Clark - Jim Henninway

== Preservation ==
A print of the film is held by Library and Archives Canada.
