= The Mayor From Ireland =

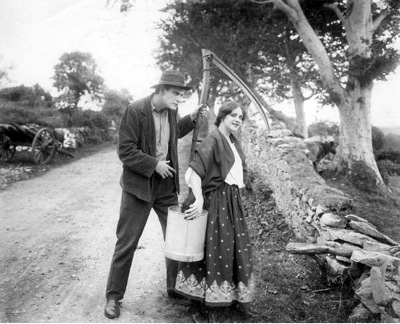
- J.P. McGowan and Gene Gauntier
- Directed by: Sidney Olcott
- Written by: Gene Gauntier
- Produced by: Kalem Company
- Starring: Gene Gauntier; Jack J. Clark; J.P. McGowan
- Cinematography: George K. Hollister
- Distributed by: General Films
- Release date: November 30, 1912
- Running time: 1000 ft
- Country: United States
- Language: English (intertitles)

The Mayor From Ireland is a 1912 American silent film produced by Kalem Company and distributed by General Films. It was directed by Sidney Olcott with Gene Gauntier, Jack J. Clark and J.P. McGowan in the leading roles.

== Cast ==
- Gene Gauntier - Bridget O'Donovan
- Jack J. Clark - Terry O'Donovan
- J.P. McGowan - Shamus Foley

== Production notes ==
The film was shot in Beaufort, County Kerry, Ireland, and in the USA, during the summer of 1912.
