= Gene Gauntier =

American writer and actress (1885–1966)

- Born: Genevieve Gauntier Liggett; August 26, 1885; Wellsville, Missouri, U.S.
- Died: December 18, 1966 (aged 81); Cuernavaca, Mexico
- Occupations: Screenwriter, actress
- Spouse: Jack J. Clark (m.1912–div.1918)

Gene Gauntier (born Genevieve Gauntier Liggett, August 26, 1885 – December 18, 1966) was an American screenwriter and actress who was one of the pioneers of the motion picture industry. A writer, director, and actress in films from mid 1906 to 1920, she wrote screenplays for 42 films. She performed in 87 films and is credited as the director of The Grandmother (1909).

== Biography ==
Born as Genevieve Gauntier Liggett in Kansas City, Missouri, to James Wesley and Ada J. Gauntier Liggett, she was the middle child of three children. Her older brother was Richard Green Liggett and her sister was Marguerite Gauntier Liggett, who married Swedish billionaire Axel Wenner-Gren. Gauntier attended the Kansas City School of Oratory while in Kansas City. In 1904, she began her stage career. Gauntier made her way to New York City where she began her career in live theater using the stage name "Gene Gauntier," and first appeared in films between acting jobs with stock company tours. She remembered in her 1928 autobiography Blazing the Trail:

“My funds were running low, and in a vague way I thought of the new opening for actors – moving pictures, but, like the rest of the legitimate profession, I looked on them with contempt and felt sure that my prestige would be lowered if I worked in them."

In June 1906, Gauntier was literally thrown into her first screen assignment when she was hired for a daredevil stunt, being filmed as a damsel thrown into a river for Biograph's The Paymaster. It was a one-reeler, where she first met her long-time friend Sidney Olcott and Frank Marion.

Gauntier then returned to stage acting as the lead female role in George Ade's The County Chairman at Kansas City's Grand Opera House.

=== The Kalem Company ===
In 1907, Gauntier became more involved in the fledgling silent film industry, working for Kalem Studios. She became Kalem's star actress, dubbed by the studio as the "Kalem Girl," and also became their most productive screenwriter in collaboration with director Sidney Olcott on numerous film projects.

In 1924, after her departure from the film industry, Gauntier reminisced about her time at Kalem as an intensely fruitful period of creative freedom, when her authorial control and influence extended well beyond acting:

In addition to playing the principal parts, I also wrote, with the exception of a bare half-dozen, every one of the five hundred or so pictures in which I appeared. I picked locations, supervised sets, passed on tests, co-directed with Sidney Olcott, cut and edited and wrote captions (when in the United States), got up a large part of the advertising matter, and, with it all, averaged a reel a week. It was work in those days—but creative work, blazing the trail. We were always discovering new possibilities and each little success or surprise fed our enthusiasm. Mr. Olcott and I had no one over us. I scarcely ever submitted a scenario and never while abroad. The Kalem never knew what our picture was to be until they saw the first run in the projection room. We would have risked our lives (and did many times) out of sheer love for, and loyalty to the Kalem. For four years the same friends were together and we were known as the O'Kalems, and later, during the oriental tour, as the El Kalems.

Gauntier's astonishing range of creative decision-making at Kalem reflects the "creative chaos in the early years [of the industry that] favored women's relatively full participation while a new order in the industry mandated against it." By 1912, Gauntier had become disillusioned with the new conditions at Kalem, and left to start her own company, Gene Gauntier Feature Players.

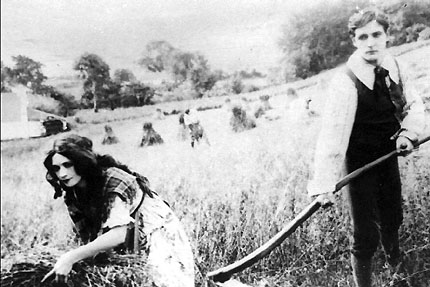
Gauntier and Jack Clarke on location in Ireland filming You Remember Ellen (1912)

=== Writing and copyright ===
Tom Sawyer was the first of over three hundred screenplays Gauntier either wrote and produced or sold. In 1907, she wrote the script for The Days of '61, the first film ever made about the American Civil War. That same year she wrote the screenplay and acted in the first Ben Hur film. The film was adapted in two days:

"I was not familiar with Ben Hur and the mere reading of the book would take two days. But this time my self-confidence [in writing] was unlimited and I promised. What is more by dint of working nearly two nights I turned in the script on schedule...and we turned out the greatest spectacle and money-maker up to that time."

At the time, there was no copyright law to protect authors, and she wrote in her autobiography about how the film industry infringed upon everything. As a result of the production of Ben Hur, Harper and Brothers and the author's estate (General Lew Wallace) brought suit against the Kalem Company, the Motion Picture Patents Company, and Gauntier for copyright infringement. The suit, which eventually settled the question of American copyright law for all time, took years to make its way through the court system but the United States Supreme Court finally ruled in favor of Harpers and Wallace, and against the film company.

Most notably, Gauntier wrote and acted in 1912's From the Manger to the Cross; a film that Turner Classic Movies considers the most important silent film to deal with the life of Jesus Christ, and which has been selected for preservation in the United States National Film Registry.

=== Independent company ===
In December 1912, Gauntier left the Kalem Company and started the independent Gene Gauntier Feature Players Company, along with her long time collaborator Sidney Olcott and her actor husband Jack Clark. She was among a number of women silent film stars to start their own independent companies during this period. Others included Florence Lawrence with the Victor Company, Helen Holmes with the Signal Film Company, Flora Finch with the Flora Finch Company (1916-1917) and Film Frolic Picture Corporation (1920), and Marion Leonard with the Gem Motion Picture Company. In early 1914, Sidney Olcott resigned as producer at Gauntier's company to start his own Sid Olcott International Features. The cause of his falling out with Gauntier remains unclear. The Gene Gauntier Feature Players Company continued until 1915.

Notable works include, The Civil War-era (1912), A Daughter of the Confederacy (1913) (adapted from Wallace Reid's stage play), Mystery of Pine Camp (1913), When Men Hate (1913), For Ireland's Sake (1914), A Daughter of Old Ireland (1914), and The Eye of the Government (1914).

Gauntier wrote and starred in many of the films her company produced, while Olcott is credited as the main director during this time. Gauntier Feature Players became competitors of Kalem and eventually faded into oblivion once Gauntier signed on with Universal Pictures and moved to Hollywood.

=== Exit from the film industry ===
In 1920 at age thirty-five, and after writing forty-two screenplays and performing in eighty-seven films, Gauntier walked away from the business. In a 1924 interview with Photoplay, Gauntier explained her reasons for leaving: "I was worn out and had lost enthusiasm, without which we cannot, of course, progress. My work in pictures had been too difficult, my strength was sapped and it had become drudgery, especially the new way in which they were produced [...] After being master of all I surveyed, I could not work under the new conditions. Domestic tragedy was the finishing touch and I was glad to get out while I could still retain some pleasant memories of the good old days."

=== Personal life and later years ===
On January 2, 1901, in Kansas City, Missouri, Genevieve Liggett married Harry Richard Pottery. He was 27, she 15 and a half. They met at the Auditorium Theatre School in Kansas City. Pottery was its treasurer. He became her producer. On March 30, 1905, a baby boy, Jean Jerome, was born at the home of the actress's parents. In June 1905, local newspapers announced the couple's divorce. On December 1, 1906, Jean Jerome died at his grandparents' home. Gene Gauntier was in Dayton, Ohio, with “The Country Chairman” theater troupe.

In 1912, Gauntier married actor Jack J. Clark. They were divorced in 1918.

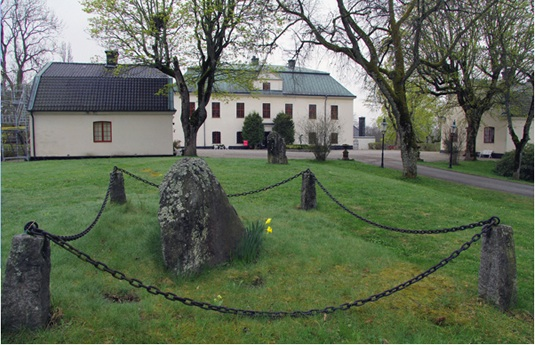
The tomb of Gauntier at Häringe Slot, Sweden

Gauntier had sailed to Europe frequently where her sister Marguerite was an opera singer who had trained and worked in Germany, and found herself stranded there when World War I broke out. After leaving filmmaking, she worked as the film and drama critic for the Kansas City Post in 1919, before returning to live in Europe where she remained for a number of years while writing her autobiography, Blazing the Trail. The work was serialized in 1928–29 in the American magazine, Woman's Home Companion, and the manuscript is on display in the Film Library of the Museum of Modern Art in New York City. Gauntier also penned two novels, Cabbages and Harlequins in 1929 and Sporting Lady in 1933.

Gene Gauntier died in 1966 in Cuernavaca, Mexico, aged 81. She is buried in Sweden at Häringe Slott close to Marguerite, her sister and Axel Wenner-Gren, her brother-in-Law.

In 1914, June 11 was declared as "Gauntier Day" at the International Exposition of Motion Pictures.

== Partial filmography ==
As actress, unless otherwise noted.

- Why Girls Leave Home (1904) (stageplay)
- The Skyscrapers of New York (1906)
- The Thaw-White Tragedy (1906)
- The Paymaster (1906)
- Ben Hur (1907) (screenwriter only; possible cast member in short)
- Evangeline (1908)
- Way Down East (1908)
- The Scarlet Letter (1908)
- Hulda's Lovers (1908)
- Dolly, the Circus Queen (1908)
- The Romance of an Egg (1908)
- The Man in the Box (1908)
- Thompson's Night Out (1908)
- The Stage Rustler (1908) (unconfirmed)
- As You Like It (1908)
- Betrayed by a Handprint (1908)
- The Girl and the Outlaw (1908) (unconfirmed)
- The Taming of the Shrew (1908)
- The Cracker's Bride( 1909)
- The Girl Spy: An Incident of the Civil War (1909)
- The Law in the Mountain (1909)
- The Wayward Daughter (1909)
- A Slave to Drink (1910)
- The Romance of a Trained Nurse (1910)
- The Man Who Lost (1910)
- The Stepmother (1910)
- The Confederate Spy (1910)
- The Further Adventures of the Girl Spy (1910)
- A Lad from Old Ireland (1910) (also screenwriter)
- The Girl Spy Before Vicksburg (1910)
- The Forager (1910)
- The Bravest Girl of the South (1910)
- The Love Romance of the Girl Spy (1910)
- The Egret Hunter (1910)
- The Navajo's Bride (1910)
- The Castaways (1910)
- A Child's Faith (1910)
- A Daughter of Dixie (1910)
- A Colonial Belle (1910)
- The Perversity of Fate (1910)
- The Evil Artist or a Girl Wronged (1910)
- The Heart of Edna Leslie (1910)
- A Lad from Old Ireland (1910)
- Seth's Temptation (1910)
- The Little Spreewald Maiden (1910)
- The Stranger (1910)
- For the Love of an Enemy (1911)
- Her Chum's Brother (1911)
- Robbie and the Redskins (1911)
- Little Sister (1911)
- The Open Road (1911)
- The Irish Honeymoon (1911)
- The Little Soldier of '64 (1911)
- A War Time Escape (1911)
- A Sawmill Hero (1911)
- The Lass Who Couldn't Forget (1911)
- In Old Florida (1911)
- The Fiddle's Requiem (1911)
- When the Dead Return (1911)
- The Carnival (1911)
- In Blossom Time (1911)
- To the Aid of Stonewall Jackson (1911)
- The Romance of a Dixie Belle (1911)
- Special Messenger (1911)
- Rory O'More (1911)
- The Colleen Bawn (1911)
- The Fishermaid of Ballydavid (1911)
- Arrah-na-Pogue (1911)
- Tangled Lives (1911)
- A Hitherto Unrelated Incident of the Girl Spy (1911)
- To the Aid of Stonewall Jackson: An Exploit of the Girl Spy (1911)
- The Colleen Bawn (1911) (also screenwriter)
- The O'Neill (1912)
- His Mother (1912)
- The Vagabonds (1912)
- Far From Erin's Isle (1912)
- You Remember Ellen (1912)
- Captain Rivera's Reward (1912)
- Victim of Circumstances (1912)
- The Belle of New Orleans (1912)
- The Fighting Dervishes of the Desert (1912)
- Missionaries in Darkest Africa (1912)
- Dust of the Desert (1912)
- Captured by Bedouins (1912)
- Tragedy of the Desert (1912)
- An Arabian Tragedy (1912)
- Winning a Widow (1912)
- A Prisoner of the Harem (1912)
- Down Through the Ages (1912)
- From the Manger to the Cross; or, Jesus of Nazareth (1912) (also screenwriter)
- The Mayor From Ireland (1912)
- The Shaughraun (1912)
- The Wives of Jamestown (1913)
- The Lady Peggy's Escape (1913)
- A Daughter of the Confederacy (1913)
- The Mystery of Pine Creek Camp (1913)
- When Men Hate (1913)
- In the Power of the Hypnotist (1913)
- In the Clutches of the Ku Klux Klan (1913)
- For Ireland's Sake (1914)
- The Eye of the Government (1914)
- Come Back to Erin (1914)
- A Fight for a Birthright (1914)
- False Evidence (1914)
- Twilight (1914)
- His Brother's Wife (1914)
- The Little Rebel (1914)
- Through the Fires of Temptation (1914)
- The Woman Hater's Baby (1915)
- The Ulster Lass (1915)
- The Maid of the Forest (1915)
- Gene of the Northland (1915)
- The Smugglers Lass (1915)
- Witch's Gold (1920)

== Script ==
- Why Girls Leave Home (1907)
- Tom Sawyer (1907)
- The Days of '61 (1907)
- Ben Hur (1907) (Regie: Sidney Olcott and others)
- The Japanese Invasion (1908)
- Hiawatha (1908)
- As You Like It (1908) (Regie: Kenean Buel)
- Evangeline (1908)
- Way Down East (1908) (Regie: Sidney Olcott)
- Washington at Valley Forge (1908)
- The Scarlet Letter (1908) (Regie: Sidney Olcott)
- Hulda's Lovers (1908) (Regie: Wallace McCutcheon)
- Dolly, the Circus Queen (1908)
- The Romance of an Egg(1908) (Regie: Wallace McCutcheon)
- The Wayward Daughter (1909)
- The Girl Spy: An Incident of the Civil War (1909)
- A Slave to Drink (1909)
- The Man Who Lost (1910)
- The Romance of a Trained Nurse (1910) (Regie: Sidney Olcott)
- The Stepmother (1910) (Regie: Sidney Olcott)
- The Confederate Spy (1910) (Regie: Sidney Olcott)
- The Forager (1910) (Regie: Sidney Olcott)
- The Castaways (1910) (Regie: Sidney Olcott)
- A Lad from Old Ireland (1910) (Regie: Sidney Olcott)
- The Little Spreewald Maiden (1910) (Regie: Sidney Olcott)
- The Girl Spy Before Vicksburg (1910) (Regie: Sidney Olcott)
- Tangled Lives (1911) (Regie: Sidnegiey Olcott)
- Last Day of School (1911) (Regie: Sidney Olcott)
- A Hitherto Unrelated Incident of the Girl Spy (1911)
- The Irish Honeymoon (1911) (Regie: Sidney Olcott)
- A Sawmill Hero (1911) (Regie: Sidney Olcott)
- The Fiddle's Requiem (1911) (Regie: Sidney Olcott)
- The Love of Summer Morn (1911) (Regie: Sidney Olcott)
- Special Messenger (1911) (Regie: Sidney Olcott)
- Rory O'More (1911) (Regie: Sidney Olcott e Robert G. Vignola - short Film)
- The Colleen Bawn (1911) (Regie: Sidney Olcott)
- The Franciscan Friars of Killarney (1911) (Regie: Sidney Olcott)
- Arrah-na-Pogue (1911) (Regie: Sidney Olcott)
- The Vengeance Mark (1912) (Regie: Sidney Olcott)
- Shaun Rhue (1912) (Regie: Sidney Olcott)
- My Hielan' Lassie (1912) (Regie: Sidney Olcott)
- The O'Kalems Visit Killarney (1912) (Regie: Sidney Olcott)
- The O'Neill (1912) (Regie: Sidney Olcott)
- His Mother (1912) (Regie: Sidney Olcott)
- Far From Erin's Isle (1912) (Regie: Sidney Olcott)
- You Remember Ellen (1912) (Regie: Sidney Olcott)
- The Fighting Dervishes of the Desert (1912) (Regie: Sidney Olcott)
- Luxor, Egypt (1912) (Regie: Sidney Olcott)
- Missionaries in Darkest Africa (1912) (Regie: Sidney Olcott)
- Making Photoplays in Egypt (1912) (Regie: Sidney Olcott)
- An Arabian Tragedy (1912) (Regie: Sidney Olcott)
- Captured by Bedouins (1912) (Regie: Sidney Olcott)
- Winning a Widow (1912) (Regie: Sidney Olcott)
- Down Through the Ages (1912) (Regie: Sidney Olcott)
- Along the River Nile (1912) (Regie: Sidney Olcott)
- The Poacher's Pardon (1912) (Regie: Sidney Olcott)
- Ancient Temples of Egypt (1912) (Regie: Sidney Olcott)
- From the Manger to the Cross (1912) (Regie: Sidney Olcott)
- The Kerry Gow (1912) (Regie: Sidney Olcott)
- The Mayor From Ireland (1912) (Regie: Sidney Olcott)
- Conway, the Kerry Dancer (1912) (Regie: Sidney Olcott)
- Ireland, the Oppressed (1912) (Regie: Sidney Olcott)
- The Shaughraun (1912) (Regie: Sidney Olcott)
- The Wives of Jamestown (1913) (Regie: Sidney Olcott)
- Lady Peggy Escape (1913) (Regie: Sidney Olcott)
- The Octoroon (1913) (Regie: Sidney Olcott)
- A Celebrated Case (1914) (Regie: George Melford)
- Gene of the Northland (1915) (Regie:Jack J. Clark)
