= His Mother =

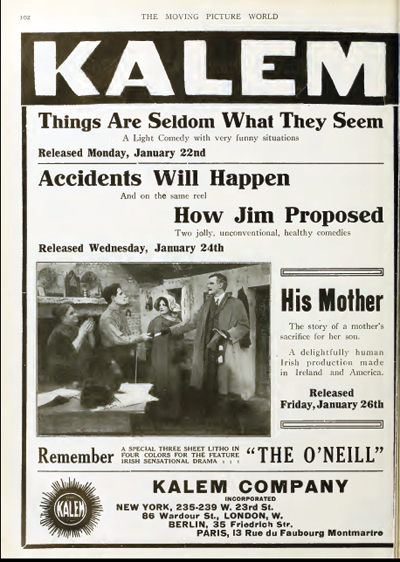
- Advertising published by The Moving Picture World, Vol 11 p 102.
- Directed by: Sidney Olcott
- Written by: Gene Gauntier
- Produced by: Kalem Company
- Starring: Jack J. Clark; Gene Gauntier
- Cinematography: George K. Hollister
- Distributed by: General Films
- Release date: January 12, 1912
- Running time: 1000 ft
- Country: United States
- Languages: Silent film (English intertitles)

His Mother is a 1912 American silent film produced by Kalem Company. It was directed by Sidney Olcott with Gene Gauntier and Jack J. Clark in the leading roles. It was one of more than a dozen films produced by the Kalem Company filmed in Ireland for American audiences.

== Plot ==
Terence, a violin player living in the Irish country side with his mother, is overheard by a group of passing Americans, including the banker John Foster who recognizes him as a musical genius and asks him to come to New York. After a few months, Terence's mother gives him her life savings to book passage for him to travel to America. He becomes a success, but rarely thinks of his mother. Pining for her son, his mother receives help from a parish priest and is able to follow him to New York. After seeing him in concert at the opera house, a stagehand guides her to Terence's house, where a butler refuses to let them in. When Terence learns of his mother, he rushes from his dinner with his friends and tearfully embraces her. He presents her to his friends, where they drink a toast to her.

== Cast ==
- Jack J. Clark - Terence
- Anna Clark - Terence's Mother
- Gene Gauntier - John Foster's Daughter
- J.P. McGowan - John Foster
- Robert G. Vignola - The Priest
- Alice Hollister
- Arthur Donaldson

== Production notes ==
The film was shot in Beaufort, County Kerry, Ireland, and in New York, during the summer of 1911, with interior shots filmed in New York.

Anna Clark is real Jack J. Clark's mother.
