= In Old Florida =

- Directed by: Sidney Olcott
- Produced by: Sidney Olcott
- Starring: Gene Gauntier
- Cinematography: George K. Hollister
- Production company: Kalem Company
- Distributed by: General Film Company
- Release date: April 15, 1911
- Running time: 970 ft
- Country: United States
- Languages: Silent film (English intertitles)

In Old Florida is a 1911 American silent film produced by Kalem Company. It was directed by Sidney Olcott with Gene Gauntier in the leading role.

== Cast ==
- Gene Gauntier

== Production notes ==
The film was shot in Jacksonville, Florida.
