= Far from Erin's Isle =

Far From Erin's Isle
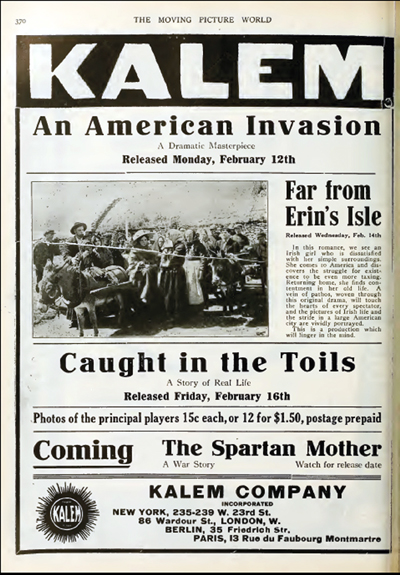
- Advertising published in The Moving Picture World, Vol 11, p 401
- Directed by: Sidney Olcott
- Written by: Gene Gauntier
- Produced by: Kalem Company
- Starring: Jack J. Clark; Gene Gauntier
- Cinematography: George K. Hollister
- Distributed by: General Films
- Release date: February 14, 1912
- Running time: 1000 ft
- Country: United States
- Languages: Silent film (English intertitles)

Far from Erin's Isle is a 1912 American silent film directed by Sidney Olcott. It was one of more than a dozen films produced by the Kalem Company filmed in Ireland for American audiences. The film tells the story of a young girl who leaves Ireland for New York, but after losing two jobs and becoming sick, returns home where she is welcomed by her family and her sweetheart.

== Cast ==
- Gene Gauntier - Kathleen
- Jack J. Clark - Brian
- Alice Hollister
- J. P. McGowan

== Production notes ==
The film was shot in Beaufort, County Kerry, Ireland, and in New York during the summer of 1911.
