= To the Aid of Stonewall Jackson =

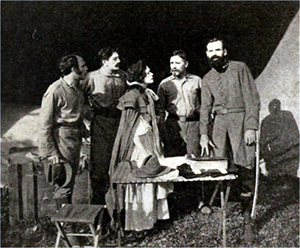
- Directed by: Sidney Olcott
- Produced by: Sidney Olcott
- Starring: Gene Gauntier
- Cinematography: George K. Hollister
- Production company: Kalem Company
- Distributed by: General Film Company
- Release date: July 7, 1911
- Running time: 1005 ft
- Country: United States
- Language: Silent (English intertitles)

To the Aid of Stonewall Jackson is an American silent film produced by Kalem Company and directed by Sidney Olcott with Gene Gauntier in the leading role. The action takes place during the Civil War.

== Cast ==
- Gene Gauntier - Nan, the Girl Spy

== Production notes ==
- The film was shot in Jacksonville, Florida.
