= The O'Neill =

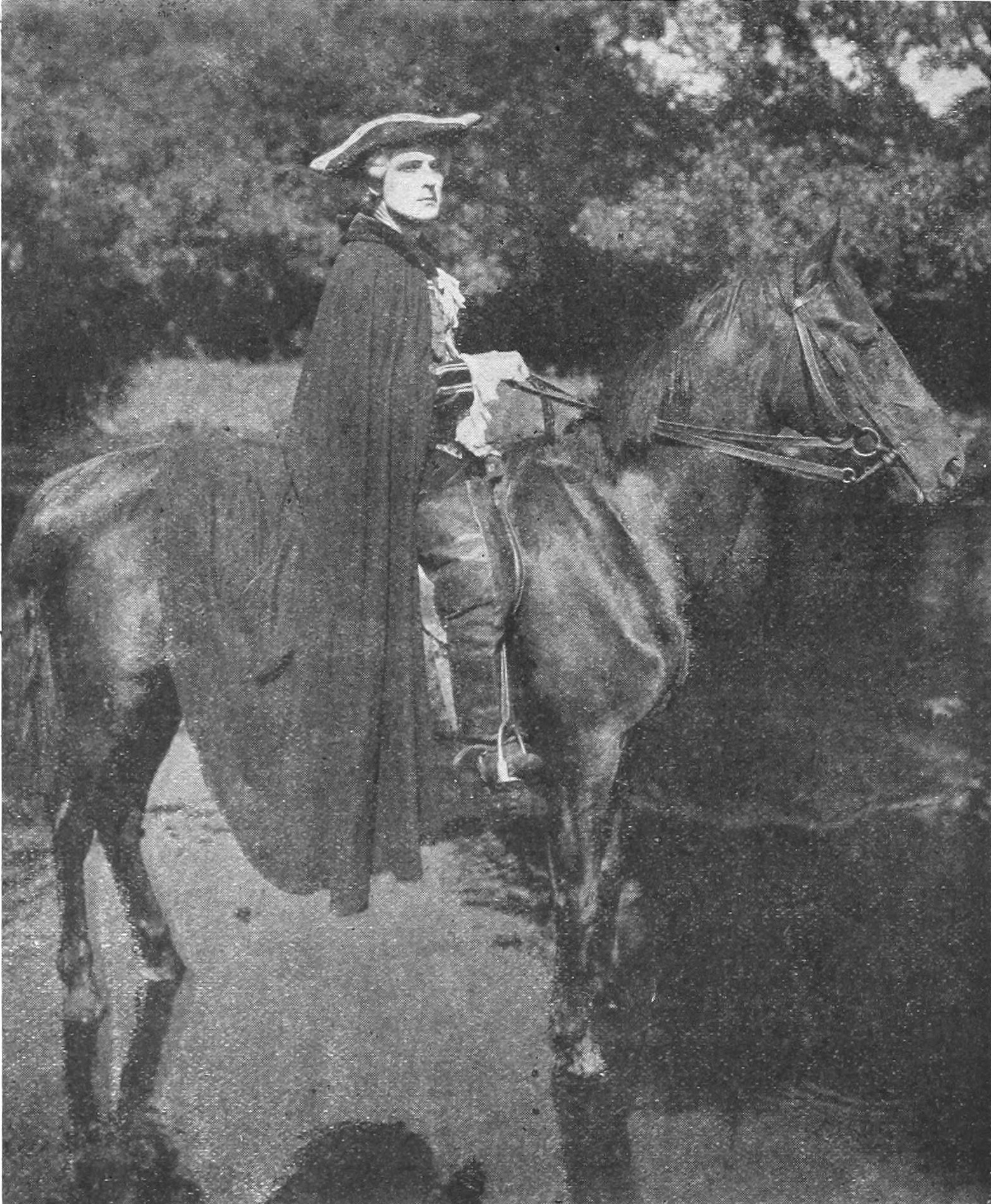
- Jack J. Clark in the title role
- Directed by: Sidney Olcott
- Produced by: Kalem Company
- Starring: Gene Gauntier; Jack J. Clark; Sidney Olcott
- Cinematography: George K. Hollister
- Distributed by: General Films
- Release date: January 12, 1912
- Running time: 990 ft
- Country: United States
- Languages: Silent; English intertitles

The O'Neill is a 1912 American silent film produced by Kalem Company and distributed by General Films. It was directed by Sidney Olcott with himself, Gene Gauntier and Jack J. Clark in the leading roles.

== Cast ==
- Gene Gauntier
- Jack J. Clark
- Sidney Olcott
- Robert Vignola

== Production notes ==
The film was shot in Beaufort, County Kerry, Ireland, during the summer of 1911.
