= A Daughter of Dixie =

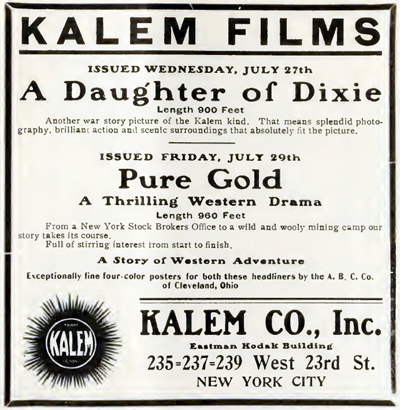
- Directed by: Sidney Olcott
- Produced by: Sidney Olcott
- Starring: Gene Gauntier
- Cinematography: George K. Hollister
- Production company: Kalem Company
- Distributed by: General Film Company
- Release date: July 27, 1910
- Running time: 900 feet
- Country: United States
- Languages: Silent film (English intertitles)

A Daughter of Dixie (1910)

A Daughter of Dixie is an American silent film produced by Kalem Company and directed by Sidney Olcott with Gene Gauntier in the leading role. It is a story about the American Civil War.

The film has two reels. Sherman Bainbridge stars in the film.

A Daughter of Dixie is a melodrama. It emphasizes the passage of time through making a clock a focal point of the scenes. As time progresses, the actors gesture to the clock in various shots.

== Cast ==
- Gene Gauntier – Miss Betsy

== Reception ==
The Morning Star praised the film, writing, "Thrilling war story with scenes laid in the South. Best picture in months. Don't miss it."
