= Helen Lindroth =

American actress (1874–1956)

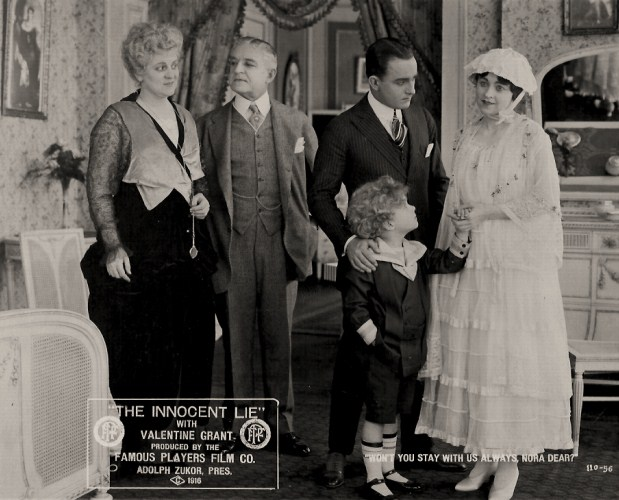
- Lindroth (left) in The Innocent Lie (1916)
- Born: December 3, 1874
- Died: October 5, 1956 (aged 81); Boston, Massachusetts
- Occupation: Actress

Helen Lindroth (December 3, 1874 – October 5, 1956) was a Swedish-born American screen and stage actress.

== Biography ==
Lindroth acted on stage with the Boston Museum Stock Company and in New York City before entering motion pictures with the Kalem Company and Famous Players. Her Broadway credits include The Nest Egg (1910), The Call of the Cricket (1910), and Springtime (1909).

In 1911, Lindroth made a one-reel film for Kalem. She performed in the film adaptation of The Swan (1925) and in The Song and Dance Man (1926), produced by George M. Cohan.

Lindroth has 96 screen credits beginning with a role in the Battle of Pottsburg Bridge in 1912. Some other films in which she performed are A Battle of Wits (1912), The Menace of Fate (1914), The Black Crook (1916), Shadows of Suspicion (1919), The Way of a Maid (1921), Unguarded Women (1924), and The Song and Dance Man (1926).

Lindroth teamed with Emma Dunn in an act that headlined vaudeville shows on the Orpheum Circuit.

== Retirement from acting and death ==
Lindroth gave up acting around 1936 and became associated with the Christian Science Benevolent Association in Chestnut Hill, Massachusetts. She retired from this philanthropic work in 1953.

On October 5, 1956, Lindroth died in Boston, Massachusetts at age 82.

== Partial filmography ==
- Battle of Pottsburg Bridge (1912)
- The Drummer Girl of Vicksburg (1912)
- From the Manger to the Cross (1912)
- The Kerry Gow (1912)
- The Poacher's Pardon (1912)
- The Wives of Jamestown (1913)
- A Sawmill Hazard (1913)
- A Desperate Chance (1913)
- The Lady Peggy's Escape (1913)
- The Octoroon (1913)
- Audrey (1916)
- The Innocent Lie (1916)
- Seventeen (1916)
- The Hungry Heart (1917)
- Little Miss Nobody (1917)
- Woman and Wife (1918)
- Kildare of Storm (1918)
- The House of Gold (1918)
- Shadows of Suspicion (1919)
- The Great Romance (1919)
- The Point of View (1920)
- Peggy Puts It Over (1921)
- The Passionate Pilgrim (1921)
- The Right Way (1921)
- The Way of a Maid (1921)
- Poor, Dear Margaret Kirby (1921)
- The Fighter (1921)
- Java Head (1923)
- Unseeing Eyes (1923)
- The Humming Bird (1924)
- Unguarded Women (1924)
- Unrestrained Youth (1925)
- The Swan (1925)
- The Song and Dance Man (1926)
