= For Ireland's Sake =

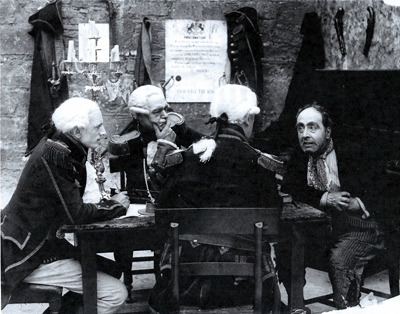
- Directed by: Sidney Olcott
- Written by: Sidney Olcott
- Produced by: Gene Gauntier Feature Players
- Starring: Gene Gauntier; Jack J. Clark; Sidney Olcott
- Distributed by: Warner's Features
- Release date: January 12, 1914
- Running time: 3000 ft
- Country: United States
- Languages: Silent film (English intertitles)

For Ireland's Sake is a 1914 American silent film produced by Gene Gauntier Feature Players and distributed by Warner's Features. it was directed by Sidney Olcott with himself, Gene Gauntier and Jack J. Clark in the leading roles.

== Cast ==
- Gene Gauntier as Eileen Donaghue
- Jack J. Clark as Marty O'Sullivan
- Mrs Norina as Mrs Bridget Donaghue
- Sidney Olcott as Father Flannigan

== Production notes ==
The film was shot in Ireland, in Beaufort, County Kerry, during summer 1913.
