= The Scarlet Letter (1908 film) =

- Directed by: Sidney Olcott
- Based on: The Scarlet Letter by Nathaniel Hawthorne
- Produced by: Sidney Olcott
- Starring: Gene Gauntier
- Production company: Kalem Company
- Distributed by: General Film Company
- Release date: March 23, 1908
- Running time: 900 ft
- Country: United States
- Languages: Silent film (English intertitles)

The Scarlet Letter is a lost 1908 silent American short film, directed by Sidney Olcott. It was based on the 1850 novel of the same name by Nathaniel Hawthorne. The screenplay was written by Gene Gauntier, who also played the character Hester Prynne. The film was produced by Kalem Company.

It was Jack Conway's first film as an actor. He later went on to direct films such as While the City Sleeps and Libeled Lady. Ruth Roland was also in the cast.

== Plot ==
Hester Prynne becomes pregnant while her husband is absent. In June 1642, in the Puritan town of Boston, a crowd gathers to witness the punishment of Prynne, who is found guilty of adultery. She is required to wear a scarlet "A" ("A" is the symbol of adultery) on her dress to shame her. Pastor Dimmesdale, who seduced the woman, hypocritically becomes one of her accusers.

== Sources ==
- The Scarlet Letter (1908) on Internet Movie Database
- Jack Conway on Internet Movie Database
