= The Egret Hunter =

1910 silent film directed by Sidney Olcott

- Directed by: Sidney Olcott
- Produced by: Sidney Olcott
- Starring: Gene Gauntier; James Vincent
- Production company: Kalem Company
- Distributed by: General Film Company
- Release date: May 6, 1910
- Running time: 970 ft
- Country: United States
- Languages: Silent film (English intertitles)

The Egret Hunter is an American silent film produced by Kalem Company and directed by Sidney Olcott with Gene Gauntier and James Vincent in the leading roles.

== Production notes ==
The film was shot in Jacksonville, Florida.
