= The Girl Thief =

1910 American silent film

- Directed by: Sidney Olcott
- Produced by: Sidney Olcott
- Production company: Kalem Company
- Distributed by: General Film Company
- Release date: March 4, 1910
- Running time: 950 ft
- Country: United States
- Languages: Silent film (English intertitles)

The Girl Thief is a 1910 American silent film produced by the Kalem Company and directed by Sidney Olcott.

== Production notes ==
The film was shot in Jacksonville, Florida.

A detailed description of each of the ten scenes was printed by The Film Index in March 1910.

== Reception ==
The Moving Picture World wrote, "This is a strong melodramatic picture, with plenty of romance, sympathetically acted by the firm's Southern stock company. It is a story of a thief's reformation through a clergyman's love, and presents in the telling a good many dramatic and interesting situations. Like all these plays from the Kalem studio, the development of the plot is strongly dramatic... The scene is laid in the South and carries with it the picturesque features common to that locality, but which seem, when properly introduced, to add a stronger touch of romance than is possible under most other conditions. The Kalem people have always used these backgrounds to good advantage, adding materially to the attractiveness and interest of their pictures."

Variety said, "The Kalem people having gotten through with their epidemic of Indians, offer a polite drama... The minister is not a conspicuously good actor. For example, at one time a door is opened just at his back, but he does not start and turn until two seconds after it has been closed again. The best actor in the company is a tough truckman, who comes to the rooms of the brother and sister to take away the girl's trunk... The reel measures up about average."
