= The Navajo's Bride =

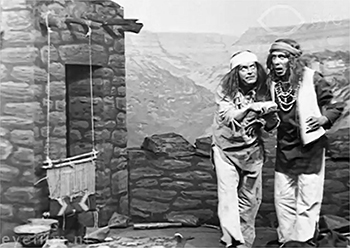
- Robert G. Vignola (left)
- Directed by: Sidney Olcott
- Produced by: Sidney Olcott
- Starring: Gene Gauntier; Robert Vignola
- Cinematography: George K. Hollister
- Production company: Kalem Company
- Distributed by: General Film Company
- Release date: June 1, 1910
- Running time: 930 ft
- Country: United States
- Languages: Silent film (English intertitles)

The Navajo's Bride is an American silent film produced by Kalem Company and directed by Sidney Olcott with Gene Gauntier and Robert Vignola in the leading roles.

A copy is kept in the Desmet collection at Eye Film Institute (Amsterdam)

== Cast ==
- Gene Gauntier -
- Robert Vignola -
