= Special Messenger =

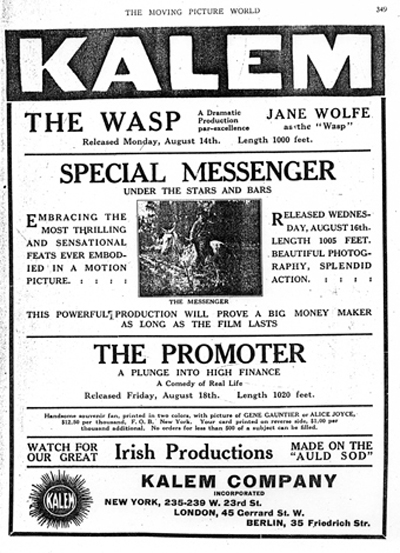
- Advertising published in The Moving Picture World.
- Directed by: Sidney Olcott
- Produced by: Kalem Company
- Starring: Gene Gauntier; Sidney Olcott; JP McGowan
- Cinematography: George K. Hollister
- Distributed by: General Film
- Release date: November 16, 1911
- Running time: 1000 ft
- Country: United States
- Languages: Silent film (English intertitles)

Special Messenger is a 1911 American silent film produced by Kalem Company and distributed by General Film. It was directed by Sidney Olcott with himself, Gene Gauntier and JP McGowan in the leading roles.

== Cast ==
- Gene Gauntier
- Sidney Olcott
- JP McGowan
