= The Open Road (1911 film) =

1911 American silent film by Sidney Olcott

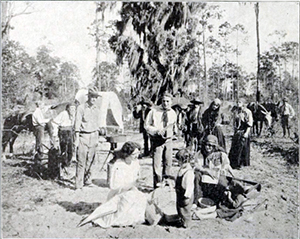
- Gene Gauntier (center)
- Directed by: Sidney Olcott
- Produced by: Sidney Olcott
- Starring: Gene Gauntier
- Cinematography: George K. Hollister
- Production company: Kalem Company
- Distributed by: General Film Company
- Release date: February 22, 1911
- Running time: 995 ft
- Country: United States
- Languages: Silent film (English intertitles)

The Open Road is an American silent film produced by Kalem Company and directed by Sidney Olcott with Gene Gauntier in the leading role.

== Cast ==
- Gene Gauntier

== Production notes ==
The film was shot in Jacksonville, Florida.
