= A Colonial Belle =

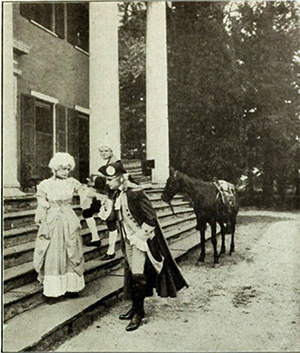
- Gene Gauntier.
- Directed by: Sidney Olcott
- Produced by: Sidney Olcott
- Starring: Gene Gauntier; Robert Vignola; George Melford
- Production company: Kalem Company
- Distributed by: General Film Company
- Release date: August 3, 1910
- Running time: 955 ft
- Country: United States
- Languages: Silent film (English intertitles)

A Colonial Belle is an American silent film produced by Kalem Company and directed by Sidney Olcott with Gene Gauntier, Robert Vignola and George Melford in the leading roles. An episode of the revolutionary war.

== Cast ==
- Gene Gauntier -
- Robert Vignola -
- James Vincent -
- George Melford -
