= The Fiddle's Requiem =

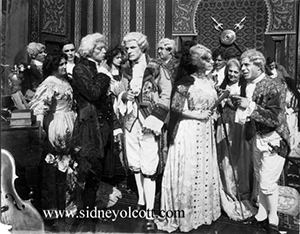
- JP McGowan (left), Robert Vignola (right)
- Directed by: Sidney Olcott
- Produced by: Sidney Olcott
- Starring: Gene Gauntier; Jack J. Clark; Robert Vignola; JP McGowan
- Cinematography: George K. Hollister
- Production company: Kalem Company
- Distributed by: General Film Company
- Release date: May 3, 1911
- Running time: 1000 ft
- Country: United States
- Languages: Silent film (English intertitles)

The Fiddle's Requiem is an American silent film produced by Kalem Company and directed by Sidney Olcott with Gene Gauntier, Jack J. Clark, Robert Vignola and JP McGowan in the leading roles.

== Cast ==
- Gene Gauntier - Dolores
- Jack J. Clark -
- Robert Vignola - Don Carlos
- JP McGowan -

== Production notes ==
The film was shot in Jacksonville, Florida.
