= Missionaries in Darkest Africa =

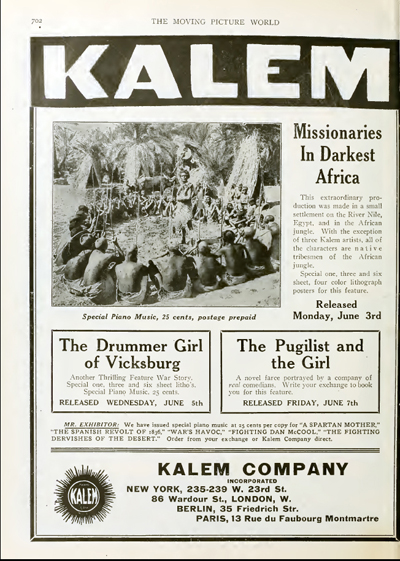
- Advertising published in The Moving Picture World, Vol 12, p 702
- Directed by: Sidney Olcott
- Produced by: Kalem Company
- Starring: Jack J. Clark; Gene Gauntier; Robert Vignola
- Cinematography: George K. Hollister
- Distributed by: General Film Company
- Release date: June 3, 1912
- Running time: 1057 ft
- Country: United States
- Languages: Silent film (English intertitles)

Missionaries in Darkest Africa is a 1912 American silent film produced by Kalem Company and distributed by General Film Company. It was directed by Sidney Olcott with Gene Gauntier, Jack J. Clark and Robert Vignola in the leading roles.

== Cast ==
- Gene Gauntier - Faith
- Jack J. Clark - The Chief
- Robert Vignola - Reverend Elbert Lawrence

== Production notes ==
The film was shot in Luxor, Egypt.
