= The Girl and the Bandit =

- Directed by: Sidney Olcott
- Produced by: Sidney Olcott
- Production company: Kalem Company
- Distributed by: General Film Company
- Release date: March 23, 1910
- Running time: 930 ft
- Country: United States
- Languages: Silent film (English intertitles)

The Girl and the Bandit is a 1910 American silent film produced by Kalem Company and directed by Sidney Olcott.

== Production notes ==
The film was shot in Jacksonville, Florida.

== Bibliography ==
- The Moving Picture World, Vol 6, p 484
- The New York Dramatic Mirror, 1910, April 2, p 17
