= Down Through the Ages =

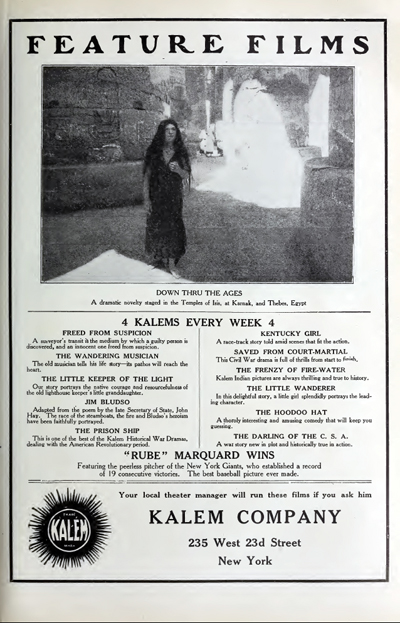
- Advertising published in Motion Picture Story Magazine, September 1912
- Directed by: Sidney Olcott
- Written by: Gene Gauntier
- Produced by: Kalem Company
- Starring: Jack J. Clark; Gene Gauntier
- Cinematography: George K. Hollister
- Distributed by: General Film Company
- Release date: September 4, 1912
- Running time: 1000 ft
- Country: United States
- Languages: Silent film (English intertitles)

Down Through the Ages is a 1912 American silent film produced by Kalem Company and distributed by General Film Company. It was directed by Sidney Olcott with Gene Gauntier and Jack J. Clark in the leading roles.

== Cast ==
- Gene Gauntier
- Jack J. Clark

== Production notes ==
The film was shot in Luxor, Egypt.
