= The Girl Spy Before Vicksburg =

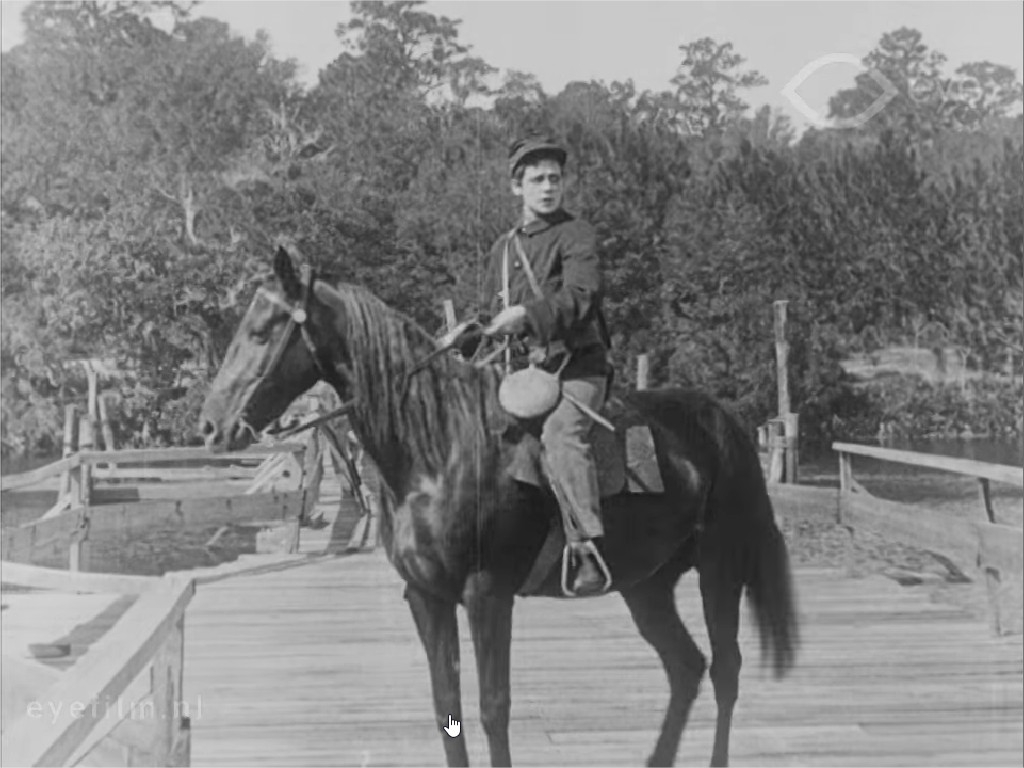
- Gene Gauntier as Nan, the Girl Spy
- Directed by: Sidney Olcott
- Written by: Gene Gauntier
- Produced by: Sidney Olcott
- Starring: Gene Gauntier; J. P. McGowan; Robert Vignola
- Cinematography: George K. Hollister
- Production company: Kalem Company
- Distributed by: General Film Company
- Release date: December 28, 1910
- Running time: 935 ft (14 minutes)
- Country: United States
- Languages: Silent film (English intertitles at release in United States)

The Girl Spy Before Vicksburg is a 1910 American silent drama film produced by Kalem Company of New York and shot at the company's "winter studio" in Jacksonville, Florida. Directed by Sidney Olcott, the Civil War drama stars Gene Gauntier, Robert Vignola and J. P. McGowan. Gauntier, in addition to performing as the production's title character, is credited with writing its storyline or "scenario".

A full copy of this film, although with Dutch intertitles, is held at the EYE Filmmuseum in Amsterdam.

== Cast ==
- Gene Gauntier as Nan, the Girl Spy
- Robert Vignola
- J. P. McGowan
- Jack J. Clark

== Plot ==
"In the absence of men, a Civil War commander asks his daughter (The Girl Spy) to sabotage a gunpowder transport. The girl disguises herself as a soldier and completes her task. After a dangerous escape, she returns to her crying mother."
