= The Romance of a Dixie Belle =

- Directed by: Sidney Olcott
- Produced by: Kalem Company
- Starring: Gene Gauntier
- Cinematography: George K. Hollister
- Distributed by: General Film
- Release date: August 11, 1911
- Running time: 970 ft
- Country: United States
- Languages: Silent film (English intertitles)

The Romance of a Dixie Belle is a 1911 American silent film produced by Kalem Company and distributed by General Film. It was directed by Sidney Olcott with Gene Gauntier in the leading roles.

== Cast ==
- Gene Gauntier - Shirley

== Production notes ==
- The film was shot in Jacksonville, Florida.
