= The Heart of Edna Leslie =

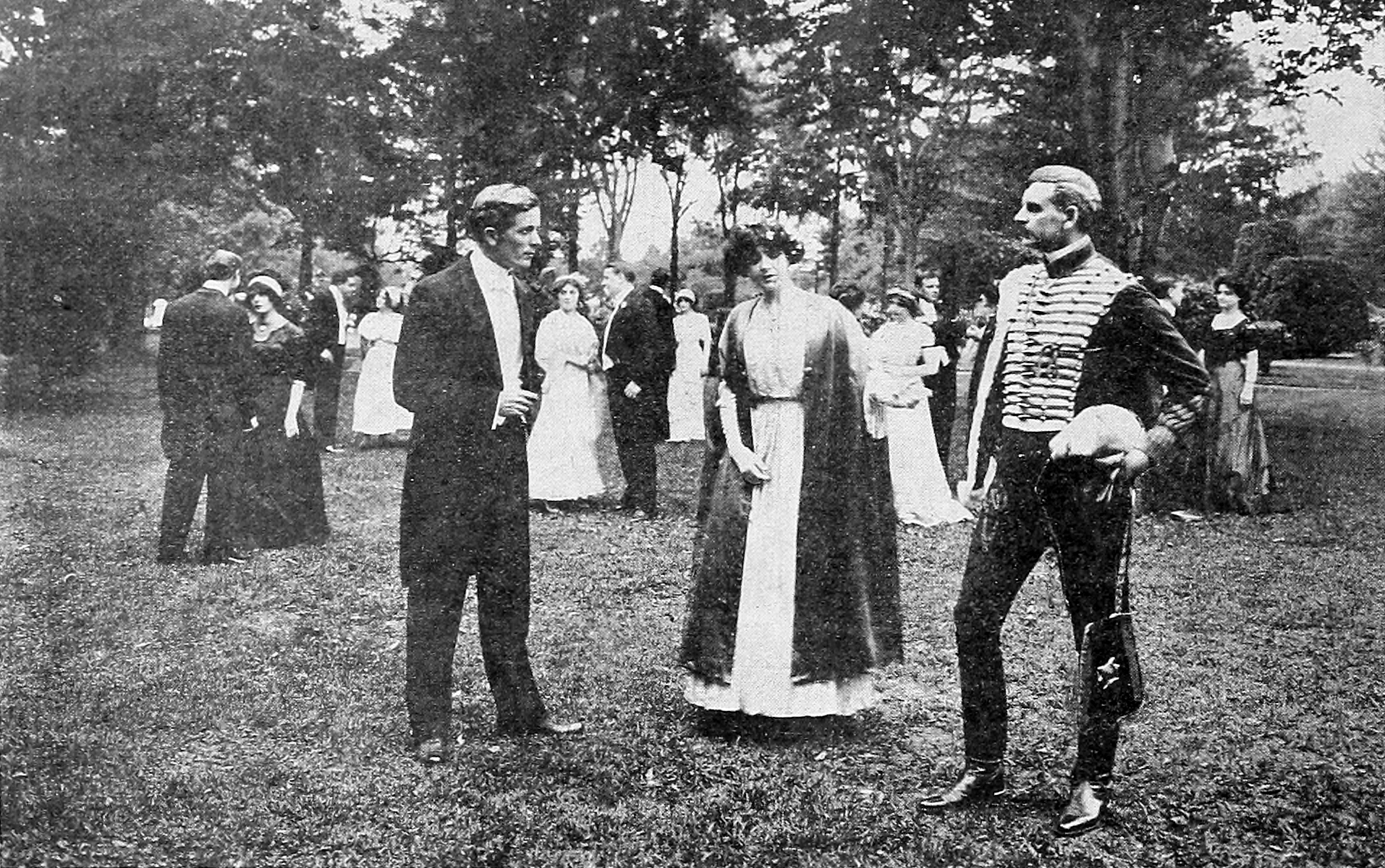
- Film still
- Directed by: Sidney Olcott
- Starring: Gene Gauntier; Alice Joyce
- Production company: Kalem Company
- Distributed by: General Film Company
- Release date: September 28, 1910
- Running time: 975 ft
- Country: United States
- Languages: Silent film (English intertitles)

The Heart of Edna Leslie is an American silent film produced by the Kalem Company and could be directed by Sidney Olcott with Gene Gauntier and Alice Joyce in the leading roles.

== Synopsis ==
The film follows Edna Leslie, a beautiful young woman who is engaged to Baron Haynair. While she does not love the man, she has agreed to the marriage in hopes of obtaining a secure life. Her plans are derailed when she meets the handsome Peyton Carter at a house party and falls almost instantly in love with him. Moments later the Baron appears; because their interactions had lasted only a short amount of time, Edna had been unable to tell Peyton of her engagement. Both men assume the worst of Edna. The Baron breaks off their engagement and Peyton casts Edna off. The stress causes Edna to have a mental breakdown that results in her losing her memories. She is nursed back to health by Peyton, who has learned the true nature of the events and wants to win back her love. The two fall in love once more and Edna regains her memories after Peyton proposes to her, secure in the knowledge that he loves and trusts her.

== Cast ==
- Gene Gauntier
- Alice Joyce

== Release ==
The film was released on September 28, 1910.

== Reception ==
Critical reception for the film was favorable. The Meridian Morning Record of October 24, 1910 reviewed it as "a drama that will appeal to many." The Neodesha Daily Sun was also favorable, praising the production and noting that "the life and personage portrayed are characteristic of the social life in America today."
