= Tom Sawyer (1907 film) =

1907 film produced by Kalem Studios

- Directed by: Unknown
- Written by: Gene Gauntier
- Based on: The Adventures of Tom Sawyer by Mark Twain
- Produced by: Kalem Studios
- Starring: Unknown
- Release date: 1907
- Running time: Unknown
- Country: United States
- Language: Silent
- Budget: Unknown
- Box office: Unknown

Tom Sawyer is a lost 1907 American silent film based on Mark Twain's 1876 novel The Adventures of Tom Sawyer made by Kalem Studios in New York City. It was the first time Twain's character appeared on film.

Very little else is currently known about the film, other than the screenplay was written by Gene Gauntier, the first of over 300 screenplays she eventually wrote.

== Sources ==
- "Tom Sawyer (1907) entry on IMDB". IMDb.
- Gauntier, Gene (October 1928). "Blazing the Trail". Woman's Home Companion. 55 (10).
- Gauntier, Gene. "Blazing the Trail".
