= Come Back to Erin =

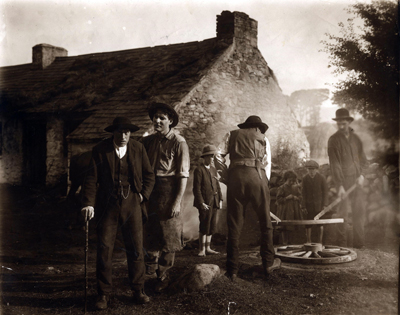
- Sidney Olcott (left), Jack J. Clark.
- Directed by: Sidney Olcott
- Written by: Sidney Olcott
- Produced by: Gene Gauntier Feature Players
- Starring: Gene Gauntier; Jack J. Clark; Sidney Olcott
- Distributed by: Warner's Features
- Release date: March 1914
- Running time: 3000 ft
- Country: United States
- Languages: Silent film (English intertitles)

Come Back to Erin is a 1914 American silent film produced by Gene Gauntier Feature Players and distributed by Warner's Features. it was directed by Sidney Olcott with himself, Gene Gauntier and Jack J. Clark in the leading roles.

== Cast ==
- Gene Gauntier as Peggy O'Malley
- Jack. J Clark as Jerry
- Sidney Olcott as Peggy's Father

== Production notes ==
- The film was shot in New York city, in Ireland, in Killarney and Beaufort, County Kerry and in Queenstown (now Cobh), co Cork.
