= The Fighting Dervishes of the Desert =

1912 American silent film by Sidney Olcott

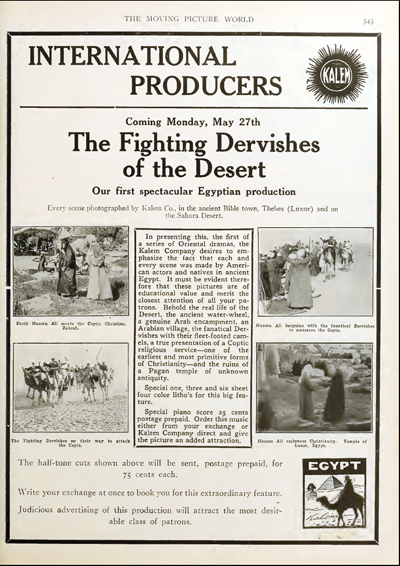
- Advertising published in The Moving Picture World, Vol 12, p 545
- Directed by: Sidney Olcott
- Produced by: Kalem Company
- Starring: Jack J. Clark; Gene Gauntier
- Cinematography: George K. Hollister
- Distributed by: General Film Company
- Release date: May 29, 1912
- Running time: 1028 ft
- Country: United States
- Languages: Silent film (English intertitles)

The Fighting Dervishes of the Desert is a 1912 American silent film produced by Kalem Company and distributed by General Film Company. It was directed by Sidney Olcott with himself, Gene Gauntier and Jack J. Clark in the leading roles.

== Cast ==
- Gene Gauntier - Zahrah
- Jack J. Clark - Hassan Ali
- Robert Vignola - Ishmail
- J.P. McGowan - Father Moosa
- Allan Farnham

== Production notes ==
The film was shot in Luxor, Egypt.
