= The Man Who Lost =

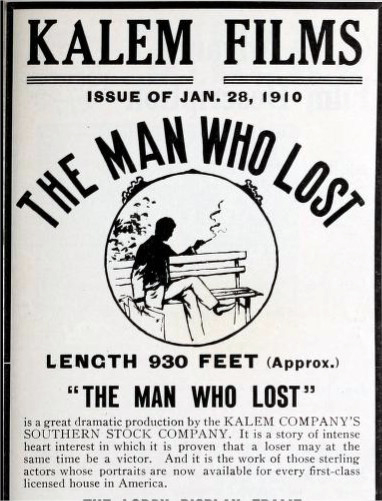
- The Film Index, 1910, January 22, p 21
- Directed by: Sidney Olcott
- Produced by: Sidney Olcott
- Starring: Thomas Santley; Gene Gauntier; George Melford; Jane Wolfe
- Production company: Kalem Company
- Distributed by: General Film Company
- Release date: January 28, 1910
- Running time: 930 ft
- Country: United States
- Languages: Silent film (English intertitles)

The Man Who Lost is a 1910 American silent film produced by Kalem Company and directed by Sidney Olcott with Thomas Santley, Gene Gauntier, George Melford in the leading roles.

== Cast ==
- Thomas Santley
- Gene Gauntier
- George Melford
- Jane Wolfe

== Production notes ==
The film was shot in Jacksonville, Florida.

== Bibliography ==
- The Billboard, 1910, January 29, p 32
- The Film Index, 1910, January 22, p 21; January 29, p 13
- The Moving Picture World, Vol 6, p 139, p 143, p 215
- The New York Dramatic Mirror, 1910, February 5, p 17
- Variety, 1910, February 5, p 125
