= When Men Hate =

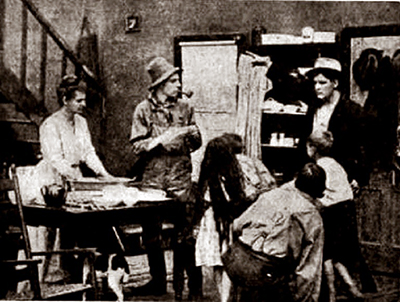
- Directed by: Sidney Olcott
- Written by: Gene Gauntier
- Produced by: Gene Gauntier Feature Players
- Starring: Gene Gauntier; Jack J. Clark
- Distributed by: Warner's Features
- Release date: June 1913
- Running time: 3000 ft
- Country: United States
- Languages: Silent film (English intertitles)

When Men Hate is a 1913 American silent film produced by Gene Gauntier Feature Players and distributed by Warner's Features. It was directed by Sidney Olcott with Gene Gauntier and Jack J. Clark in the leading roles.

== Cast ==
- Gene Gauntier - Ruth Morrisson
- Jack J. Clark - Donald Weston
- Alfred Hollingsworth - Jem Morrison

== Production notes ==
- The film was shot in Jacksonville, Florida.
