= A Daughter of the Confederacy =

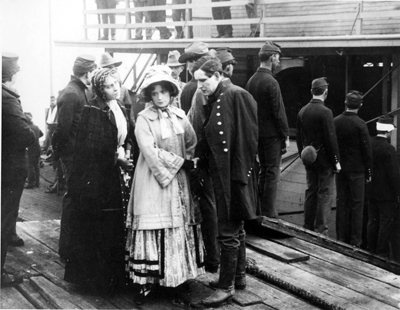
- Gene Gauntier (left) and Jack J. Clark.
- Directed by: Sidney Olcott
- Written by: Gene Gauntier
- Produced by: Gene Gauntier Feature Players
- Starring: Gene Gauntier; Jack J. Clark
- Distributed by: Warner's Features
- Release date: March 1, 1913
- Running time: 3000 ft
- Country: United States
- Languages: Silent film (English intertitles)

A Daughter of the Confederacy is a 1913 American silent film produced by Gene Gauntier Feature Players and distributed by Warner's Features. It was directed by Sidney Olcott with Gene Gauntier and Jack J. Clark in the leading roles.

== Cast ==
- Gene Gauntier as Nan, the Girl Spy
- Jack J. Clark as Captain Allison

== Production notes ==
- The film was shot in Jacksonville, Fla.
- It is the first film produced by Gene Gauntier Feature Players.
