= A Poor Wife's Devotion =

1909 film directed by Sidney Olcott

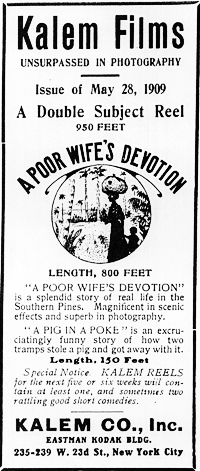
- Advestising in The Moving Picture World
- Directed by: Sidney Olcott
- Produced by: Sidney Olcott
- Production company: Kalem Company
- Distributed by: General Film Company
- Release date: May 28, 1909
- Running time: 800 ft
- Country: United States
- Languages: Silent film (English intertitles)

A Poor Wife's Devotion is a 1909 American silent film produced by Kalem Company and directed by Sidney Olcott, shot in Florida.

== Production notes ==
The film was shot in Jacksonville, Florida.

== Bibliography ==
- The Moving Picture World, Vol 4 n°, p 723.
- The New York Dramatic Mirror, May 6, 1909, p 15.
