= The Perversity of Fate =

- Directed by: Sidney Olcott
- Produced by: Sidney Olcott
- Starring: Gene Gauntier; James Vincent; Jack J. Clark
- Production company: Kalem Company
- Distributed by: General Film Company
- Release date: August 17, 1910
- Running time: 970 ft
- Country: United States
- Languages: Silent film (English intertitles)

The Perversity of Fate is an American silent film, produced by Kalem Company and directed by Sidney Olcott with Gene Gauntier and James Vincent in the leading role.

== Cast ==
- Gene Gauntier -
- James Vincent
- Jack J. Clark

== Production note ==
The film was shot in Canada
