= Captured by Bedouins =

1912 American film

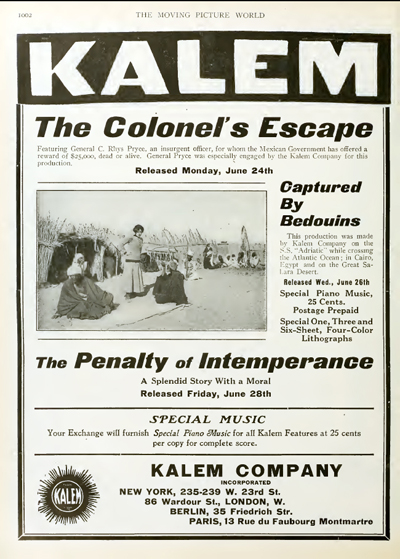
- Advertising published in The Moving Picture World, Vol 12, p. 1002
- Directed by: Sidney Olcott
- Written by: Gene Gauntier
- Produced by: Kalem Company
- Starring: Jack J. Clark; Gene Gauntier
- Cinematography: George K. Hollister
- Distributed by: General Film Company
- Release date: June 26, 1912
- Running time: 1000 ft
- Country: United States
- Languages: Silent film (English intertitles)

Captured by Bedouins is a 1912 American silent film produced by Kalem Company and distributed by General Film Company. It was directed by Sidney Olcott with Gene Gauntier and Jack J. Clark in the leading roles.

== Cast ==
- Gene Gauntier - Doris
- Jack J. Clark - Lieutenant Grieg

== Production notes ==
The film was shot in Luxor, Egypt.
