= The Bravest Girl of the South =

- Directed by: Sidney Olcott
- Produced by: Kalem Company
- Starring: Gene Gauntier
- Release date: April 22, 1910
- Running time: 830 ft
- Country: United States
- Languages: Silent film (English intertitles)

The Bravest Girl of the South is a 1910 American silent film produced by Kalem Company. It was directed by Sidney Olcott with Gene Gauntier in the leading role. It is a story of the Civil War.

== Production notes ==
The film was shot in Jacksonville, Florida.
