= Her Soldier Sweetheart =

- Directed by: Sidney Olcott
- Produced by: Sidney Olcott
- Production company: Kalem Company
- Distributed by: General Film Company
- Release date: March 9, 1910
- Running time: 985 ft
- Country: United States
- Languages: Silent film (English intertitles)

Her Soldier Sweetheart is a 1910 American silent film, produced by Kalem Company and directed by Sidney Olcott.
