= The Castaways (film) =

- Directed by: Sidney Olcott
- Written by: Gene Gauntier
- Produced by: Sidney Olcott
- Starring: Gene Gauntier
- Cinematography: Knute Rahmn
- Production company: Kalem Company
- Distributed by: General Film Company
- Release date: June 3, 1910
- Running time: 975 ft
- Country: United States
- Languages: Silent film (English intertitles)

The Castaways is an American silent film produced by Kalem Company and directed by Sidney Olcott with Gene Gauntier in the leading role.

== Cast ==
- Gene Gauntier
