= In the Power of the Hypnotist =

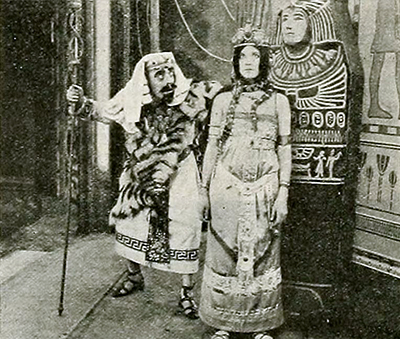
- Sidney Olcott and Gene Gauntier
- Directed by: Sidney Olcott
- Written by: Gene Gauntier
- Produced by: Gene Gauntier Feature Players
- Starring: Gene Gauntier; Jack J. Clark; Sidney Olcott
- Distributed by: Warner's Features
- Release date: September 1913
- Running time: 3000 ft
- Country: United States
- Languages: Silent film (English intertitles)

In the Power of the Hypnotist is a 1913 American silent film produced by Gene Gauntier Feature Players and distributed by Warner's Features. It was directed by Sidney Olcott with himself, Gene Gauntier and Jack J. Clark in the leading roles.

== Cast ==
- Sidney Olcott as Gondorza
- Gene Gauntier as Gondorza's Daughter
- Jack J. Clark as The Detective

== Production notes ==
- The film was shot in Jacksonville, Fla.
