= An Arabian Tragedy =

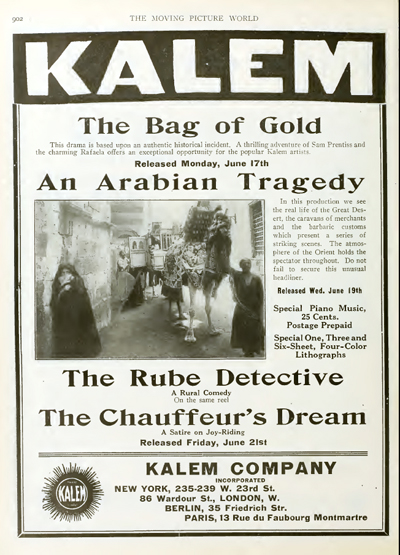
- Advertising published in The Moving Picture World, Vol 12, p. 902
- Directed by: Sidney Olcott
- Written by: Gene Gauntier
- Produced by: Kalem Company
- Starring: Gene Gauntier; Robert Vignola; Alice Hollister
- Cinematography: George K. Hollister
- Music by: Walter Cleveland Simon
- Distributed by: General Film Company
- Release date: June 19, 1912
- Running time: 1000 ft
- Country: United States
- Languages: Silent film (English intertitles)

An Arabian Tragedy is a 1912 American silent film produced by Kalem Company and distributed by General Film Company. It was directed by Sidney Olcott with Gene Gauntier, Robert Vignola and Alice Hollister in the leading roles.

== Plot ==
Ayub Kashif becomes embittered toward his wife, Fatima, because she's childless. He eventually decides to divorce Fatima and free her slave, Hanfi, whom he then plans to marry. Fatima, who still loves her husband, lives a life of sorrow, praying that her husband's love will return to her. A year later, Allah grants Ayub an heir. Fatima hearing of the event, writes Ayub, requesting that she be allowed to attend his wife as a slave, which Ayub denies. Four years later, Ayub, with a number of other merchants, departs to take rich merchandise across the desert. While on the journey he falls critically ill and, according to Turkish custom, is left to die. Fatima, in her dreams, sees that her husband is about to perish. Haunted by the vision, she begs his new wife to send aid to Ayub. Hanfi, caring only for her personal comfort, laughs at her. Fatima, accompanied by two slaves, starts searching for Ayub. After crossing the desert, Fatima finds him digging his own grave and, with a prayer that he be forgiven, Ayub dies in her arms.

== Cast ==
- Gene Gauntier - Lucasha / Ayub's 1st Wife
- Robert Vignola - Ayub Kashif
- Alice Hollister as Hanfi (Slave Girl) / Ayub's 2nd Wife
- George Hollister, Jr. as Kafur
- J.P. Gowan as Undetermined Second Role

== Production notes ==
The film was shot in Luxor, Egypt.
