= The Eye of the Government =

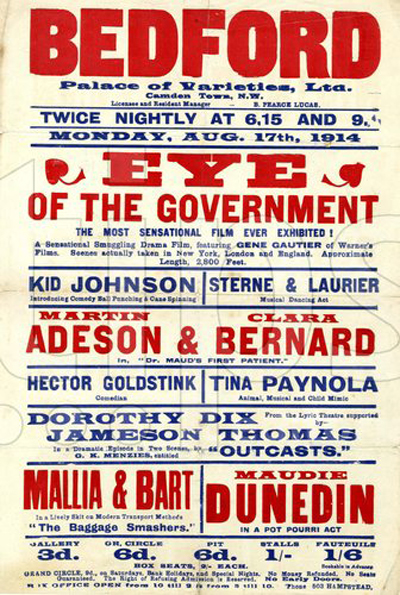
- Advertising
- Directed by: Sidney Olcott
- Produced by: Gene Gauntier Feature Players
- Starring: Gene Gauntier; Jack J. Clark; Sidney Olcott
- Distributed by: Warner's Features
- Release date: April 1914
- Running time: 3 reels
- Country: United States
- Languages: Silent; English intertitles

The Eye of the Government is a 1914 American silent film produced by Gene Gauntier Feature Players and distributed by Warner's Features. It was directed by Sidney Olcott with himself, Gene Gauntier and Jack J Clark in the leading roles.

== Cast ==
- Gene Gauntier
- Jack J. Clark
- Sidney Olcott

== Production notes ==
The film was shot in Ireland and on board a liner on the Atlantic Ocean.
