= The Miser's Child =

- Directed by: Sidney Olcott
- Produced by: Sidney Olcott
- Production company: Kalem Company
- Distributed by: General Film Company
- Release date: February 23, 1910
- Running time: 940 ft
- Country: United States
- Languages: Silent film (English intertitles)

The Miser's Child is a 1910 American silent film produced by Kalem Company and directed by Sidney Olcott.

== Production ==
The film was shot in Jacksonville, Florida.
