= The Confederate Spy =

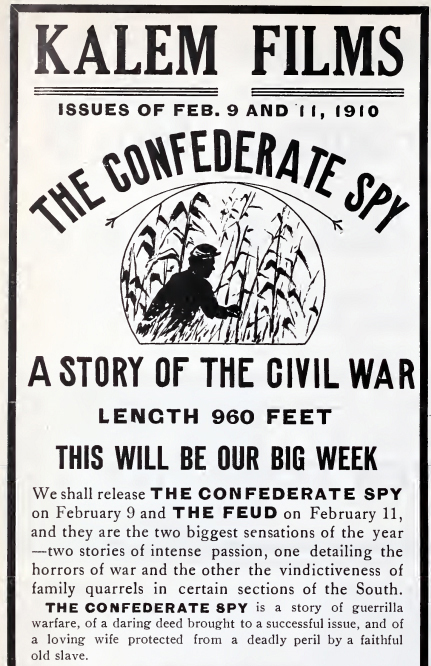
- The Film Index, February 5, 1910
- Directed by: Sidney Olcott
- Produced by: Sidney Olcott
- Production company: Kalem Company
- Distributed by: General Film Company
- Release date: April 13, 1910
- Running time: 15 minutes (1 reel; original release length 960 feet)
- Country: United States
- Languages: Silent film (English intertitles)

The Confederate Spy is a 1910 American silent drama film produced by Kalem Company and directed by Sidney Olcott. A story about the Civil War.

== Production notes ==
The production was filmed in Jacksonville, Florida.
