= The Little Spreewald Maiden =

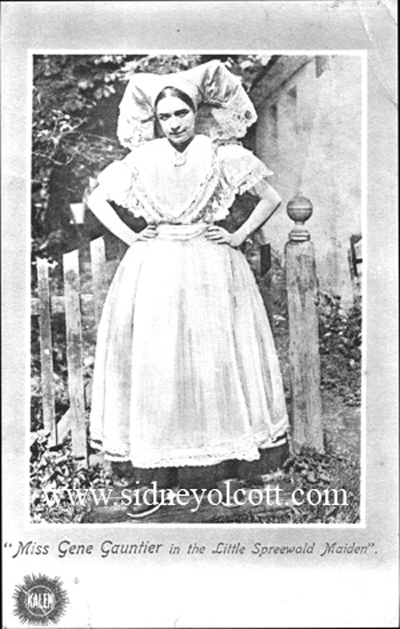
- Gene Gauntier as the Spreewald maiden
- Directed by: Sidney Olcott
- Produced by: Sidney Olcott
- Starring: Gene Gauntier; Sidney Olcott
- Cinematography: George K. Hollister
- Production company: Kalem Company
- Distributed by: General Film Company
- Release date: December 21, 1910
- Running time: 1000 ft
- Country: United States
- Languages: Silent film (English intertitles)

The Little Spreewald Maiden is an American silent film produced by Kalem Company and directed by Sidney Olcott with him and Gene Gauntier in the leading roles.

== Cast ==
- Gene Gauntier - Frieda, the Spreewald maiden
- Sidney Olcott - Hans, her sweetheart

== Production notes ==
The film is shot in 1910, at Raddusch Spreewald, along the river Spree in Germany and in New York.
