= The Lad from Old Ireland =

1910 film

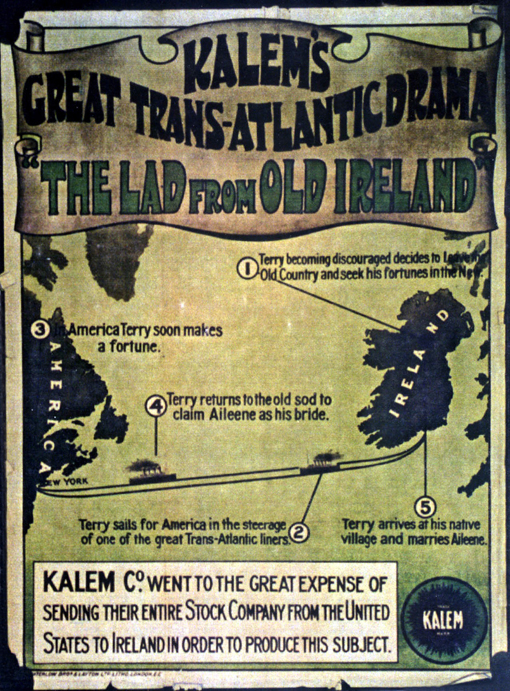
- Directed by: Sidney Olcott
- Written by: Gene Gauntier
- Starring: Sidney Olcott; Gene Gauntier; Thomas O'Connor
- Cinematography: George K. Hollister
- Distributed by: Kalem Company
- Release date: November 23, 1910
- Running time: 12 minutes
- Country: United States
- Language: Silent (English intertitles)

The Lad from Old Ireland, also called A Lad from Old Ireland, is a one-reel 1910 American motion picture directed by and starring Sidney Olcott and written by and co-starring Gene Gauntier. It was the first film appearance of prolific actor/director J.P. McGowan.

== Production background ==
The film was the first ever production by an American movie studio to be filmed on location outside of the United States. Filming took place around Cork and Killarney in Ireland, and in New York City.

In August 1910, the Kalem Company of New York City sent director Sidney Olcott and a film crew to film in Europe. In Ireland, Olcott made The Lad From Old Ireland from a script written by Gene Gauntier. Shot by cinematographer George K. Hollister, the film was described in the publicity releases for its November premiere as "Kalem’s Great Trans-Atlantic Drama."

Laurene Santley doubles the Irish grandmother in the indoor sequence shot in the Kalem New York studio.

During that trip in Ireland Olcott shot a second film : The Irish Honeymoon.

== Plot ==
An Irish boy (Olcott) emigrates to America to escape the desperate poverty of Ireland. After finding work in construction, he finds success in politics. He returns to Ireland after receiving a letter from his sweetheart (Gauntier) just as her destitute family is being forced off their land.

== Cast ==
- Sidney Olcott as Terry O'Connor
- Gene Gauntier as Aileene
- Agnes Mapes as Aileene's mother
- Thomas O'Connor as The landlord
- Arthur Donaldson as Parish priest
- J.P. McGowan as Election agent
- Robert G. Vignola as Election agent
- Jane Wolfe as Society woman
- Laurene Santley doubles the Irish grandmother

== Reception ==
The film was a critical and popular success, particularly with Irish immigrants in America. Unlike other films of the time, the Irish characters were not cartoonish caricatures, and the story was a familiar and hopeful one for immigrants. William Wright, Kalem's treasurer, recalled "Of that subject we sold in London alone 160 prints – a record-breaking achievement for a thousand-foot picture." The success prompted Kalem to send a larger company under the direction of Olcott the next year in 1911, which produced 18 films that summer.

The Moving Picture World noted that the film was "quite a success", but complained that the audience was not informed of and thus unable to appreciate "the important characteristics of the picture", referring to the authentic portrayal of Irish rural life.
