= The Irish Honeymoon =

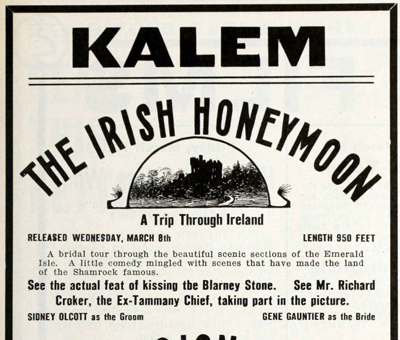
- Advertising published in The Film Index, February 02, 1911
- Directed by: Sidney Olcott
- Written by: Gene Gauntier
- Produced by: Kalem Company
- Starring: Gene Gauntier; Sidney Olcott
- Cinematography: George K. Hollister
- Distributed by: General Film
- Release date: March 8, 1911
- Running time: 1000 ft
- Country: United States
- Languages: Silent film (English intertitles)

The Irish Honeymoon is a 1911 American silent film produced by the Kalem Company and distributed by General Film. It was directed by Sidney Olcott with him and Gene Gauntier in the leading roles.

== Cast ==
- Gene Gauntier as Maggie McClusky
- Sidney Olcott as Larry Malone

== Production notes ==
- The film was shot in Ireland: Queenstown, Cork, Blarney Castle, Muckross Abbey, Gap of Dunloe, Killarney Lakes, Glencairn, and Dublin
- Richard Croker, old Tammany Hall leader, appears in the film.
