= Sidney Olcott =

Canadian filmmaker (1873–1949)

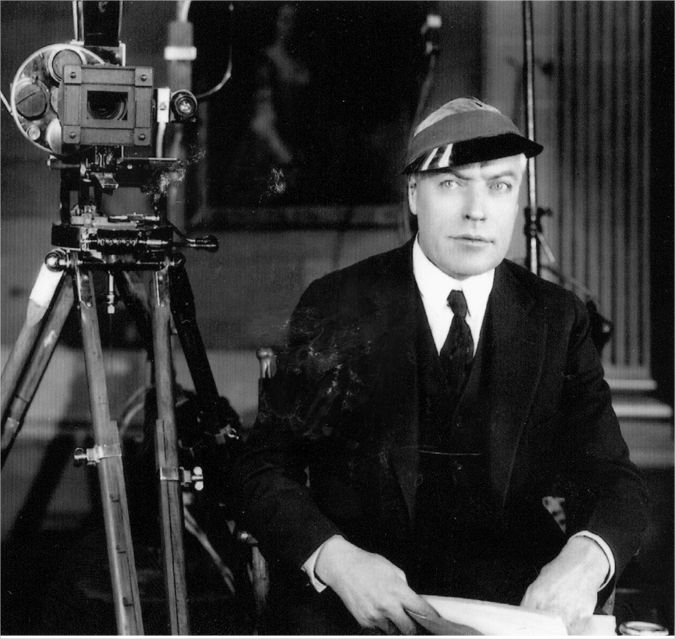
- Olcott in 1922
- Born: John Sidney Allcott; September 20, 1872; Toronto, Ontario, Canada
- Died: December 16, 1949 (aged 77); Hollywood, California, U.S.
- Occupations: Film director, producer, screenwriter, actor
- Years active: 1904–1942
- Spouse: Valentine Grant (m. 1914; died 1949)

Sidney Olcott (born John Sidney Allcott; September 20, 1872 – December 16, 1949) was a Canadian-born film producer, director, actor and screenwriter.

== Biography ==
Born John Sidney Allcott in Toronto, he became one of the first great directors of the motion picture business. With a desire to be an actor, a young Sidney Olcott went to New York City where he worked in the theatre until 1904 when he performed as a film actor with the Biograph Studios.

In 1907, Frank J. Marion and Samuel Long, with financial backing from George Kleine, formed a new motion picture company called the Kalem Company and were able to lure the increasingly successful Olcott away from Biograph. Olcott was offered the sum of ten dollars per picture and under the terms of his contract, Olcott was required to direct a minimum of one, one-reel picture of about a thousand feet every week. After making a number of very successful films for the Kalem studio, including Ben Hur (1907) with its dramatic chariot race scene, and Dr. Jekyll and Mr. Hyde (1908), Olcott became the company's president and was rewarded with one share of its stock. In 1910, Olcott went to Ireland where he made a film called A Lad from Old Ireland. He would go on to make more than a dozen films there and later on only the outbreak of World War I prevented him from following through with his plans to build a permanent studio in Beaufort, County Kerry, Ireland. The Irish films led to him taking a crew to Palestine in 1912 to make the first five-reel film ever, titled From the Manger to the Cross, the life story of Jesus.

The film concept was at first the subject of much scepticism but when it appeared on screen, it was lauded by the public and the critics. Costing $35,000 to produce, From the Manger to the Cross earned the Kalem Company profits of almost $1 million, a staggering amount in 1912. The motion picture industry acclaimed him as its greatest director and the film influenced the direction many great filmmakers would take such as D.W. Griffith and Cecil B. DeMille. From the Manger to the Cross is still shown today to film societies and students studying early film making techniques. In 1998, the film was selected for the National Film Registry of the United States Library of Congress.

Despite making the studio owners very rich men, they refused to increase his salary beyond the $150 a week he was then earning. From the enormous profits made for his employers, Olcott's dividend on the one share they had given him amounted to $350. As a result, Olcott resigned and took some time off, making only an occasional film until 1915 when he was encouraged by Mary Pickford to join her at Famous Players–Lasky, later Paramount Pictures. The Kalem Company never recovered from the mistake of losing Olcott and a few years after his departure, the operation was acquired by Vitagraph Studios in 1916.

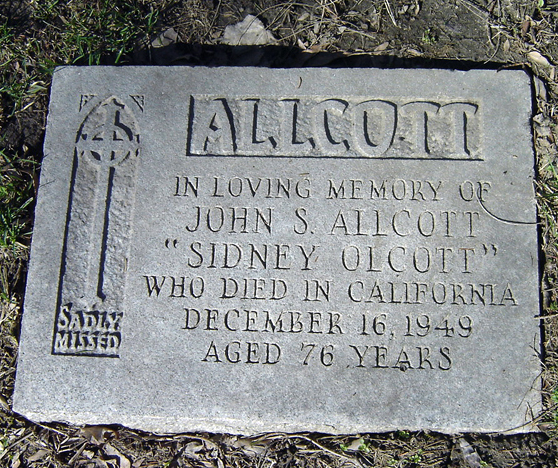
Olcott's grave in Toronto, Ontario

Olcott was a founding member of the East Coast chapter of the Motion Picture Directors Association, a forerunner to today's Directors Guild of America and would later serve as its president. Olcott married actress Valentine Grant, the star of his 1916 film, The Innocent Lie.

During World War II, Olcott opened his home to visiting British Commonwealth soldiers in Los Angeles. In his book titled Stardust and Shadows: Canadians in Early Hollywood, writer Charles Foster tells of this period in Olcott's life, and of how he was introduced to many members of Hollywood's Canadian community through Olcott. Olcott died in Hollywood, California, in the house of his friend Robert Vignola where he lived after the death of Valentine Grant. Wanting to be buried in Canada, he is buried in Park Lawn cemetery in Toronto, Ontario.

== Partial filmography ==
- A Runaway Sleighbelle (1907)
- The Dog Snatcher (1907)
- Bowser's House Cleaning (1907)
- The Gentleman Farmer (1907)
- A Hobo Hero (1907)
- The Pony Express (1907)
- The New Hired Girl (1907)
- The Tenderfoot (1907)
- Off for the Day (1907)
- The Sea Wolf (1907)
- The Parson's Picnic (1907)
- The Book Agent (1907)
- A One Night Stand (1907)
- Who'll Do The Washing (1907)
- Peggy's Camping Party (1907)
- The Wooing of Miles Standish (1907)
- Nature Fakirs (1907)
- The Amateur Detective (1907)
- The Red Man's Way (1907)
- Chinese Slave Smuggling (1907)
- The Spring Gun (1907)
- Nathan Hale (1907)
- The Goldbrick (1907)
- It Was Mother-in-Law (1907)
- The Rival Motorists (1907)
- Bill Butt-in and the Burglar (1907)
- Troubles of a Tramp (1907)
- The Lost Mine (1907)
- Woman Cruel Woman (1907)
- A Dramatic Rhearsal (1907)
- School Days (1907 film)|School Days (1907)
- Ben Hur (1907)
- Days of '61 (1908)
- Back to the Farm (1908)
- Mountainers (1908)
- Dogs of Fashion (1908)
- Quack Doctors (1908)
- Under the Star Splanged Banner (1908)
- Evangeline (1908)
- The Stowanay (1908)
- College Days (1908)
- The Banan'Man (1908)
- Henry Hudson (1908)
- Way Down East (1908)
- Washington at Valley Forge (1908)
- The Scarlet Letter (1908)
- Captain Kid (1908)
- The Moonshiner's Daughter (1908)
- Night Riders (1908)
- The Under Dog (1908)
- Legend of Sleepy Hollow (1908)
- Kidnapped for Hate (1908)
- Dolly the Circus Queen (1908)
- The White Squaw Man (1908)
- The Man Hunt (1908)
- Enoch Arden (1908)
- Lady Audley's Secret (1908)
- Held by Bandits (1908)
- The Little Madcap (1908)
- Mrs Gunness, the Female Bluebeard (1908)
- Dynamite Man (1908)
- The Renegade (1908)
- The New Hired Girl (1908)
- A Gipsy Girl's Love (1908)
- The Walls of Sing Sing (1908)
- The Girl Nihilist (1908)
- Robin Hood (1908)
- The Frontiersman's Bride (1908)
- As You Like It (1908)
- The Great Yellowstone Park Hold Up (1908)
- The Old Sleuth Detective (1908)
- The Padrone (1908)
- The Mystery of the Bride in White (1908)
- The Girl I Left Behind Me (1908)
- Caught in the Web (1908)
- The Half Breed (1908)
- Jerusalem in the Time of Christ (1908)
- David and Goliath (1908)
- Fire at Sea (1908)
- Humpty Dumpty Circus (1908)
- The Railroad Detective (1908)
- Hannah Dustin (1908)
- A Ragged Hero (1908)
- Maggie, the Dock Rat (1908)
- For Love of Country (1908)
- The Molly Maguires (1908)
- Red Cloud (1908 film)|Red Cloud (1908)
- Dr. Jekyll and Mr. Hyde (1908) starring Frank Oakes Rose.
- The Trail of the White Man (1909)
- A Florida Feud (1909)
- The Girl at the Old Mill (1909)
- The Octoroon (1909)
- The Detectives of the Italian Bureau (1909)
- The High Diver (1909)
- Sporting Days in the South (1909)
- The Making of a Champion Pugilist (1909)
- The New Minister (1909)
- The Old Soldier's Story (1909)
- The Seminomle's Vengeance (1909)
- The Crackers Bride (1909)
- Hungry Hank's Hallucination (1909)
- The Mysterious Double (1909)
- The Fish Pirates (1909)
- The Orange Grower's Daughter (1909)
- The Northern Schoolmaster (1909)
- The Artist and the Girl (1909)
- Love's Triumph (1909)
- Good for Evil (1909)
- The Girl Spy: An Incident of the Civil War (1909)
- A Poor Wife's Devotion (1909)
- A Pig in a Poke (1909)
- A Child of the Sea (1909)
- The Omnibus Taxiclub (1909)
- $5000 Reward (1909)
- The Little Angel of Roaring Springs (1909)
- The Mystic Swing (1909)
- A Priest of the Wilderness (1909)
- Mardi Gras in Havana (1909)
- The Japanese Invasion (1909)
- Famine in the Forest (1909)
- A Soldier of US Army (1909)
- The Escape from Andersonville (1909)
- The Tom-Boy (1909)
- Tickle Mary (1909)
- Factory Girl (1909)
- Traced by Kodak (1909)
- Out of Work (1909)
- The Queen of the Quarry (1909)
- The Conspirators - An Incident of a South American Revolution (1909)
- The Pay Car (1909)
- Hiram's Bride (1909)
- The Story of a Rose (1909)
- Winning a Diner (1909)
- The Winning Boat (1909)
- The Mystery of Sleeper Trunk (1909)
- The Hand Organ Man (1909)
- The Man and the Girl (1909)
- A Brother's Wrong (1909)
- The Girl Scout (1909)
- The Cattle Thieves (1909)
- Dora (1909)
- Pale Face's Wooing (1909)
- The Governor's Daughter (1909)
- Judgement (1909 film)|Judgement (1909)
- The Geisha Who Saved Japan (1909)
- Rally 'Round the Flag (1909)
- The Law of the Mountains (1909)
- The Card Board Baby (1909)
- A Slave to Drink (1909)
- The Deacon's Daughter (1910)
- The Romance of a Trained Nurse (1910)
- The Man Who Lost (1910)
- The Step-Mother (1910)
- The Confederate Spy (1910)
- The Feud (1910)
- The Fisherman's Granddaughter (1910)
- The Miser's Child (1910)
- The Girl Thief (1910)
- Her Soldier Sweetheart (1910)
- The Seminole's Trust (1910)
- The Girl and the Bandit (1910)
- The Further Adventures of the Girl Spy (1910)
- The Old Fiddler (1910)
- The Forager (1910)
- The Bravest Girl of the South (1910)
- The Sacred Turquoise of the Zuni (1910)
- The Love Romance of the Girl Spy (1910)
- The Egret Hunter (1910)
- Between Love and Duty (1910)
- The Aztec Sacrifice (1910)
- The Seminole Halfbreeds (1910)
- The Cliff Dwellers (1910)
- Friends (1910)
- The Castaways (1910)
- The Wanderers (1910)
- The Navajo's Bride (1910)
- The Miner's Sacrifice (1910)
- Grandmother (1910)
- A Daughter of Dixie (1910)
- A Colonial Belle (1910)
- The Perversity of Fate (1910)
- The Cow Puncher's Sweetheart (1910)
- Leap for Life (1910)
- The Conspiracy of Pontiac (1910)
- The Heart of Edna Leslie (1910)
- The Way of Life (1910)
- The Lad from Old Ireland (1910)
- Seth's Temptation (1910)
- The Little Spreewald Maiden (1910)
- When Lovers Part (1910)
- The Girl Spy Before Vicksburg (1910)
- The Stranger (1910)
- The Education of Elizabeth (1910)
- For the Love of an Enemy (1911)
- The Secret of the Still (1911)
- Her Chum's Brother (1911)
- The Little Sister (1911)
- Grandmother's War Story (1911)
- The Open Road (1911)
- Sailor Jack's Reformation (1911)
- The Irish Honeymoon (1911)
- The Diver (1911)
- A War Time Escape (1911)
- A Sawmill Hero (1911)
- The Lass Who Couldn't Forget (1911)
- By a Woman's Wit (1911)
- In Old Florida (1911)
- The Fiddle's Requiem (1911)
- When the Dead Return (1911)
- The Carnival (1911)
- In Blossom Time (1911)
- Tangled Lives (1911)
- The Railroad Raiders of '62 (1911)
- The Little Soldier of '64 (1911)
- To the Aid of Stonewall Jackson (1911)
- Hubby's Day at Home (1911)
- The Colonel's Son (1911)
- The Romance of a Dixie Belle (1911)
- Special Messenger (1911)
- Rory O'More (1911)
- Losing to Win (1911)
- The Colleen Bawn (1911)
- The Fishermaid of Ballydavid (1911)
- Among the Irish Fisher Folk (1911)
- The Franciscan Friars of Killarney (1911)
- Arrah-na-Pogue (1911)
- Driving Home the Cows (1912)
- A Southern Boy of '61 (1912)
- The O'Neill (1912)
- His Mother (1912)
- The O'Kalems Visit Killarney (1912)
- The Vagabonds (1912)
- Far From Erin's Isle (1912)
- You Remember Ellen (1912)
- A Visit to Madeira (1912)
- The Kalemites Visit Gibraltar (1912)
- Along the Mediterranean (1912)
- The Potters of the Nile (1912)
- American Tourists Abroad (1912)
- Egypt the Mysterious (1912)
- Egypt as it Was in the Time of Moses (1912)
- The Fighting Dervishes of the Desert (1912)
- Luxor Egypt (1912)
- Missionaries in Darkest Africa (1912)
- Making Photoplays in Egypt (1912)
- A Pet of the Cairo Zoo (1912)
- An Arabian Tragedy (1912)
- Captured by Bedouins (1912)
- Tragedy of the Desert (1912)
- Winning a Widow (1912)
- Egyptian Sports (1912)
- A Prisoner of the Harem (1912)
- Easter Celebration at Jerusalem (1912)
- Palestine (1912)
- From Jerusalem to the Dead Sea (1912)
- Down Through the Ages (1912)
- The Ancient Port of Jaffa (1912)
- Along the River Nile (1912)
- Ancient Temples of Egypt (1912)
- The Poacher's Pardon (1912)
- From the Manger To the Cross (1912)
- The Kerry Gow (1912)
- The Mayor From Ireland (1912)
- Conway, the Kerry Dancer (1912)
- Ireland, the Oppressed (1912)
- The Shaughraun (1912)
- The Wives of Jamestown (1913)
- The Lady Peggy's Escape (1913)
- A Daughter of the Confederacy (1913)
- The Mystery of Pine Creek Camp (1913)
- When Men Hate (1913)
- In the Power of the Hypnotist (1913)
- In the Clutches of the Ku Klux Klan (1913)
- For Ireland's Sake (1914)
- Come Back To Erin (1914)
- When Men Would Kill (1914)
- In the Hands of a Brute (1914)
- The Eye of the Government (1914)
- A Mother of Men (1914)
- The Idle Rich (1914)
- Tricking the Government (1914)
- The Little Rebel (1914)
- The Moth and the Flame (1915)
- All For Old Ireland (1915)
- Bold Emmett Ireland's Martyr (1915)
- Seven Sisters (1915)
- The Irish in America (1915)
- Nan O' the Backwoods (1915)
- Madame Butterfly (1915)
- The Ghost of Twisted Oaks (1915)
- The Taint (1915)
- Poor Little Peppina (1916)
- My Lady Incog (1916)
- Diplomacy (1916)
- The Innocent Lie (1916)
- The Smugglers (1916)
- The Daughter of MacGregor (1916)
- The Belgian (1918)
- Marriage for Convenience (1919)
- Scratch My Back (1920)
- The Right Way (1921)
- God's Country and the Law (1921)
- Pardon My French (1921)
- Timothy's Quest (1922)
- The Green Goddess (1923)
- Little Old New York (1923)
- The Humming Bird (1924)
- Monsieur Beaucaire (1924)
- The Only Woman (1924)
- Salome of the Tenements (1925)
- The Charmer (1925)
- Not So Long Ago (1925)
- The Best People (1925)
- Ranson's Folly (1926)
- The Amateur Gentleman (1926)
- The White Black Sheep (1926)
- The Claw (1927)

== See also ==
- Canadian pioneers in early Hollywood

== Sources ==
- Michel Derrien, Aux origines du cinéma irlandais: Sidney Olcott, le premier oeil, TIR 2013; ISBN 978-2-917681-20-6 (in French)
