= Beaufort, County Kerry =

Village in County Kerry, Ireland

Beaufort Lios an Phúca
- Village
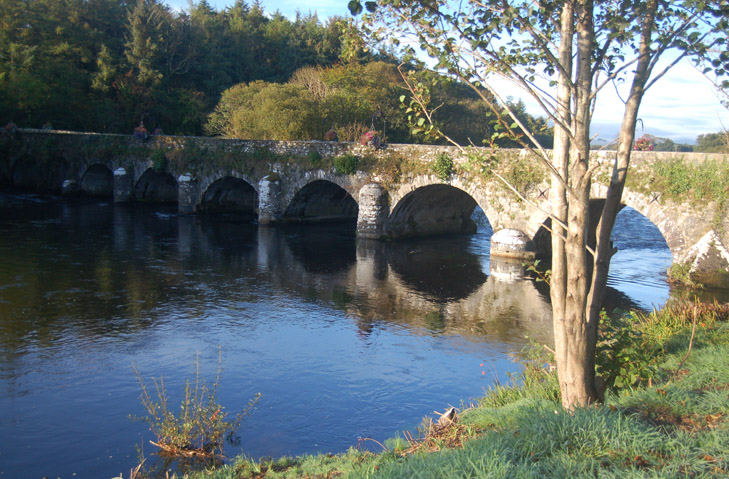
- Beaufort Bridge

- Location in Ireland
- Coordinates: 52°04′08″N 09°38′20″W
- Country: Ireland
- Province: Munster
- County: County Kerry
- Elevation: 34.155 m (112.06 ft)

Population (2016)
  - Total: 251

Beaufort (Irish: Lios an Phúca) is a small village that lies on the banks of the River Laune in County Kerry, in the southwest of Ireland. It consists of a post office, three public houses, one supermarket, parish hall, guest houses and thirty private houses. As of the 2016 census, the population was 251. 9 km west of Killarney, Beaufort sits at the foot of Ireland's highest mountain Carrantuohill.

Edward Day, Archdeacon of Ardfert from 1782, lived here until his death in 1808. His estate later passed to his nephew, the Reverend John Robert Fitzgerald-Day, who lived at Beaufort from the 1840s to his death in 1881.

In 1910, Kalem Company, an American moving-picture company spent several weeks in the village shooting films. Among the company: the director Sidney Olcott, actress Gene Gauntier, Alice Hollister and actors Jack J. Clark, Robert Vignola, JP McGowan, the cinematographer George K. Hollister. The first film was The Lad from Old Ireland, the first American movie to be shot outside the U.S.. This was followed by Rory O'More, The Irish Honeymoon, The Colleen Bawn and Arrah-na-Pogue, which were adapted from Dion Boucicault's plays.

Olcott returned to Beaufort each summer until 1914. He rented the hotel owned by Patrick O'Sullivan who also owned a pub, which still exists today: The Beaufort Bar.

== Historical sites ==
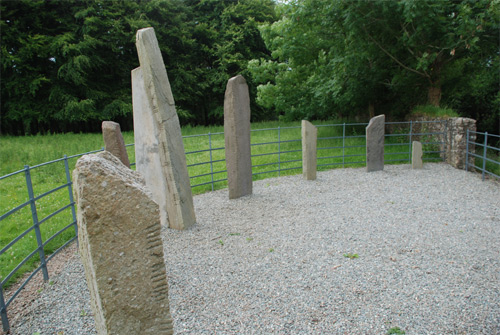
Dunloe Ogham Stones

Over 100 historical sites have been identified and mapped in the area including the Dunloe Ogham Stones, two castle ruins, and Dunloe Castle, built in 1207. The ruins of two ancient churches still stand in the parish today. One, situated at Kilgobnet on O'Shea's land and associated with St. Gobnait, the other in Churchtown burial ground, which is more than five centuries old. Ballymalis Castle, located 4 km to the northwest of Beaufort, is a National Monument.

The Beaufort Bridge over the River Laune was built in 1837.

== Sports ==
Beaufort GAA is the local GAA team who compete at various underage levels to senior and junior levels. Divisionally they compete in Mid-Kerry championship.
