= George K. Hollister =

American cinematographer and actor (1873-1952)

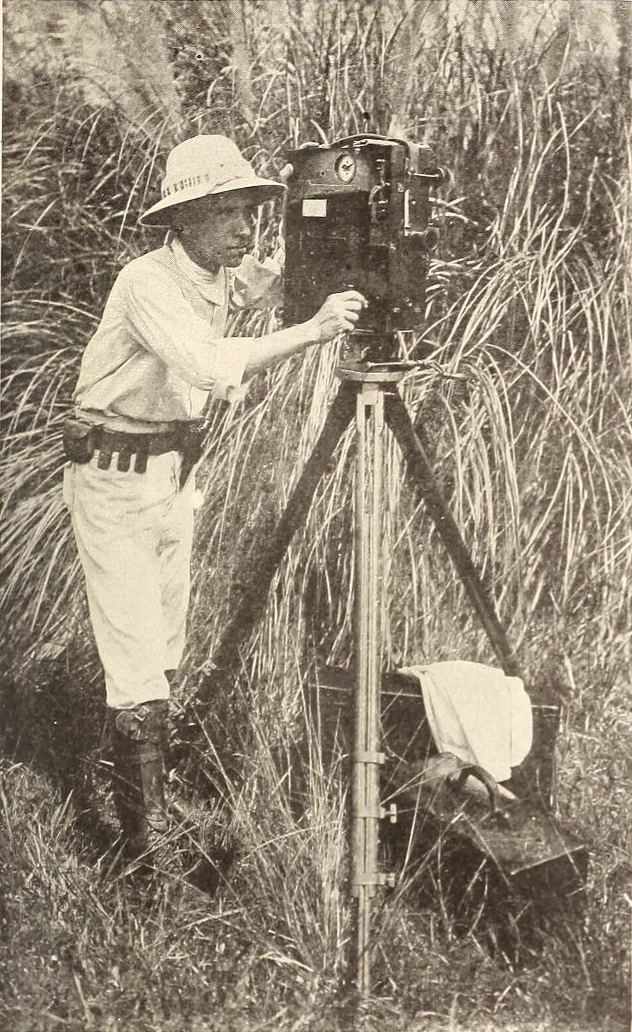
George Hollister c. 1916

George K. Hollister (March 7, 1873 – March 28, 1952) was an American pioneer cinematographer.

== Biography ==
Born in New York City, New York, little is known of his background. In 1905 he married a nineteen-year-old woman named Alice Hollister from Worcester, Massachusetts, the daughter of French-Canadian immigrants. They had a daughter, Doris Ethel, born in 1906 and George Jr., born in 1908.

Around 1908, Hollister was hired by the Kalem Company to train as a camera operator. Under film director Sidney Olcott, he was the camera man for the pioneering Kalem team that filmed in Florida during the winter and in 1910 would be part of the first ever crew to film on location outside of the United States. Traveling to Ireland with Olcott's crew that included leading lady and principal screenwriter Gene Gauntier, George Hollister shot The Lad from Old Ireland and The Irish Honeymoon, a travelogue shot in Blarney Castle, Glengarriff and at the Lakes of Killarney. A Kalem crew returned to Ireland in each of the next two years and in 1912. Alice, Hollister's wife was a character actress of Kalem.

In December 1911, he embarked in New York with Olcott and a full cast of actors for a journey that would last eleven months. Alice and their two children accompanied him. In January 1912, he was in Egypt, first Cairo and then Luxor where he boxed about thirty films. In April, he was in Jerusalem to film his most important cinematic accomplishment in Palestine : From the Manger to the Cross. The film told the story of Jesus, and in 1998 was selected for the National Film Registry of the United States Library of Congress.

At the beginning of June, the troupe left Palestine, crossed the Mediterranean and then all of Europe by train and settled for the summer in Beaufort near Killarney, in Ireland where Hollister shot seven films. He returned to New York on October 12, 1912. For this journey, Hollister travelled 30,000 miles, visited 12 countries on three continents, travelling by boat, train, car, on foot, camel, horse and donkey...

Hollister appeared as an actor in a few scenes in several films and did his last camera work in 1929. He died in Los Angeles in 1952 and is interred in the Great Mausoleum, Columbarium of Solace at Forest Lawn Memorial Park Cemetery in Glendale, California. His wife Alice, who died in 1973, is interred with him.

== Partial filmography ==
- The Lad from Old Ireland (1910)
- The Little Spreewald Maiden (1910)
- The Irish Honeymoon (1911)
- The Fiddle's Requiem (1911)
- When the Dead Return (1911)
- The Railroad Raiders of '62 (1911)
- The Romance of a Dixie Belle (1911)
- Special Messenger (1911)
- Rory O'More (1911)
- Losing to Win (1911)
- The Colleen Bawn (1911)
- The Fishermaid of Ballydavid (1911)
- Among the Irish Fisher Folk (1911)
- The Franciscan Friars of Killarney (1911)
- Arrah-na-Pogue (1911)
- The O'Neill (1912)
- His Mother (1912)
- The O'Kalems Visit Killarney (1912)
- The Vagabonds (1912)
- Far From Erin's Isle (1912)
- You Remember Ellen (1912)
- A Visit to Madeira (1912)
- The Kalemites Visit Gibraltar (1912)
- Along the Mediterranean (1912)
- The Potters of the Nile (1912)
- American Tourists Abroad (1912)
- Egypt the Mysterious (1912)
- Egypt as it Was in the Time of Moses (1912)
- The Fighting Dervishes of the Desert (1912)
- Luxor Egypt (1912)
- Missionaries in Darkest Africa (1912)
- Making Photoplays in Egypt (1912)
- A Pet of the Cairo Zoo (1912)
- An Arabian Tragedy (1912)
- Captured by Bedouins (1912)
- Tragedy of the Desert (1912)
- Winning a Widow (1912)
- Egyptian Sports (1912)
- A Prisoner of the Harem (1912)
- Easter Celebration at Jerusalem (1912)
- Palestine (1912)
- From Jerusalem to the Dead Sea (1912)
- Down Through the Ages (1912)
- The Ancient Port of Jaffa (1912)
- Along the River Nile (1912)
- Ancient Temples of Egypt (1912)
- The Poacher's Pardon (1912)
- From the Manger To the Cross (1912)
- The Kerry Gow (1912)
- The Mayor From Ireland (1912)
- Conway, the Kerry Dancer (1912)
- Ireland, the Oppressed (1912)
- The Shaughraun (1912)
- The Vampire (1913)
- The Great Adventure (1918)
- To Hell with the Kaiser! (1918)
- The Silent Woman (1918)
- The Great Victory (1919)
- Wyoming Tornado (1929)
- Bad Men's Money (1929)
