= The Girl Spy =

Silent film series

- Created by: Sidney Olcott, Gene Gauntier
- Years: 1909–1911

Films and television
- Film(s): The Girl Spy: An Incident of the Civil War (1909); The Further Adventures of the Girl Spy (1910); The Bravest Girl in the South (1910); The Love Romance of the Girl Spy (1910); The Girl Spy Before Vicksburg (1910); To the Aid of Stonewall Jackson: An Exploit of the Girl Spy (1911)

The Girl Spy films are an American silent film series produced by Kalem and shot in Jacksonville, Florida. The films in the series were directed by Sidney Olcott and all starred American filmmaker and actress Gene Gauntier who was also the screenwriter for the series. The films are The Girl Spy: An Incident of the Civil War (1909); The Further Adventures of the Girl Spy (1910); The Bravest Girl in the South (1910); The Love Romance of the Girl Spy (1910); The Girl Spy Before Vicksburg (1910); and To the Aid of Stonewall Jackson: An Exploit of the Girl Spy (1911).

== Content ==
In each film, Gauntier plays Nan, a Confederate spy during the Civil War who often cross-dresses in order to achieve her physically daring missions. Gauntier also reprised the role of Nan in The Little Soldier of ’64 (1911) and A Daughter of the Confederacy (1913); the latter was produced by Gauntier's production company, the Gene Gauntier Feature Players. The series was reportedly inspired by real-life spy Belle Boyd.

== Reception ==
The series is considered important by contemporary film scholars who argue that Gauntier's "girl spy" character is a precursor to the popular daredevil American film serial queens like Pearl White and Grace Cunard in the later 1910s and mark the beginning of the stunt-driven American movie serial genre centered around an intrepid young woman. Other historians have emphasized the series' importance as part of a first wave (from 1908-1921) of American films featuring women cross-dressing that were set on the frontier or during the Civil War.

A copy of The Girl Spy: An Incident of the Civil War is held at Library and Archives Canada; a copy of The Further Adventures of the Girl Spy is held at both the BFI National Archive, and the Library of Congress; and a copy of The Girl Spy Before Vicksburg is held at the EYE Filmmuseum in Amsterdam.
