= Jack J. Clark =

American film director

- Born: September 23, 1879; Philadelphia, Pennsylvania
- Died: April 12, 1947 (aged 67); Hollywood, California
- Spouse: Francis Rose Musolf (m. 1929)

Jack J. Clark (September 23, 1879 – April 12, 1947) was an American director and actor of the early motion picture industry.

== Biography ==
Clark was born on September 23, 1879, in Philadelphia, Pennsylvania. He was persuaded to enter motion pictures in 1907 by Sidney Olcott of the New York-based Kalem Studios during the silent film era. Clark traveled through 24 countries with the film company becoming one of the first American film stars to film on foreign location. While in the Holy Land, Kalem Studios produced the first passion play, From the Manger to the Cross, casting Jack Clark as John the Apostle. Clark and co-star Gene Gauntier were married during the filming, in 1912. They divorced in 1918.

During a three-year leave from the film industry in the early 1920s, Jack was instructor of dramatic arts at Villanova University. He organized a dramatic workshop and produced the mystical play Vision. About the same time he staged a pageant, Charity, with a cast of 600 persons, which established new records at the Philadelphia Metropolitan Opera House. He also wrote and produced a dramatic musical pageant, Columbus, which, with a cast of more than 1000 was staged at the Philadelphia Academy of Music for the Knights of Columbus.

In 1929, Jack Clark married Francis Rose Musolf. They remained married until his death.

Among Clark's plays were The Prince of Pilsen and 45 Minutes from Broadway. He acted in more than 200 films including The Colleen Bawn (1911), From the Manger to the Cross (1912), The Shaughraun (1912), The Last of the Mafia (1915), A Fool's Paradise (1916), Audrey (1916), Pajamas (1927), Love and Learn (1928), and Broadway Howdy (1929). Among the films he directed or produced were The Yankee Girl (1915) and The Mad Maid of the Forest (1915).

Jack Clark died on April 12, 1947, in Hollywood, California.

== Partial filmography ==
=== 1910 ===
- The Conspiracy of Pontiac
- When Lovers Part

=== 1911 ===
- For the Love of an Enemy
- Her Chum's Brother
- The Little Sister
- Grandmother's War Story
- Sailor Jack's Reformation
- A War Time Escape
- A Sawmill Hero
- The Lass Who Couldn't Forget
- By a Woman's Wit
- The Fiddle's Requiem
- When the Dead Return
- The Carnival
- In Blossom Time
- Tangled Lives
- The Railroad Raiders of '62
- The Little Soldier of '64
- To the Aid of Stonewall Jackson
- Hubby's Day at Home
- The Colonel's Son
- The Romance of a Dixie Belle
- Special Messenger
- Rory O'More
- Losing to Win
- The Colleen Bawn
- The Fishermaid of Ballydavid
- Among the Irish Fisher Folk
- The Franciscan Friars of Killarney
- Arrah-na-Pogue

=== 1912 ===
- A Southern Boy of '61
- The O'Neill
- His Mother
- The O'Kalems Visit Killarney
- The Vagabonds
- Far From Erin's Isle
- You Remember Ellen
- A Visit to Madeira
- The Kalemites Visit Gibraltar
- Along the Mediterranean
- American Tourists Abroad
- The Fighting Dervishes of the Desert
- Missionaries in Darkest Africa
- Making Photoplays in Egypt
- Captured by Bedouins
- Tragedy of the Desert
- Winning a Widow
- A Prisoner of the Harem
- Down Through the Ages
- The Ancient Port of Jaffa
- Ancient Temples of Egypt
- The Poacher's Pardon
- From the Manger To the Cross
- The Kerry Gow
- The Mayor From Ireland
- Ireland, the Oppressed
- The Shaughraun

=== 1913 ===
- The Wives of Jamestown
- The Lady Peggy's Escape
- A Daughter of the Confederacy
- The Mystery of Pine Creek Camp
- When Men Hate
- In the Power of the Hypnotist
- In the Clutches of the Ku Klux Klan

=== 1914 ===
- For Ireland's Sake
- Come Back To Erin
- The Eye of the Government
- The Little Rebel
- Through the Fire of Temptation
- A Fight for a Birthright
- Marian, the Holy Terror
- Twilight
- His Brother's Wife

=== 1915 ===
- The Last of the Mafia
- The Smuggler's Lass
- The Woman Hater's Baby
- The Ulster Lass
- The Mad Maid of the Forestl
- Gene of the Northlandl
- The Little Rebel

=== 1916 ===
- A Fool's Paradisel
- Audrey
- Scorched Wings
- The Innocent Lie
