= Tangled Lives =

Tangled Lives may refer to:

- Tangled Lives (1910 film), a short film produced by Thanhouser Company, presumed lost
- Tangled Lives (1911 film), a film produced by Kalem Company, directed by Sidney Olcott
- Tangled Lives (1917 film), a film produced by Fox Film Corporation, directed by J. Gordon Edwards
- Tangled Lives (1918 film), a film directed by Paul Scardon
