= Driving Home the Cows =

- Directed by: Sidney Olcott
- Written by: D. Whitley
- Based on: poem by Katherine Osgood
- Produced by: Kalem Company
- Starring: Alice Hollister; Leo Berger; Gene Gauntier; Jack Clark
- Cinematography: George K. Hollister
- Distributed by: General Films
- Release date: January 1, 1912
- Running time: 1000 ft
- Country: United States
- Languages: Silent; English intertitles

Driving Home the Cows is a 1912 American silent film produced by Kalem Company. It was directed by Sidney Olcott with Alice Hollister and Leo Berger. The film was shot in Jacksonville.

== Cast ==
- Gene Gauntier
- Alice Hollister
- Jack Clark
- Leo Berger
- Bill Holiday
- T. A. Riggs
