= Tragedy of the Desert =

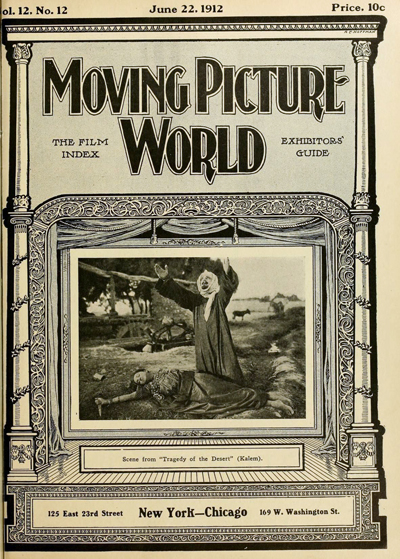
- Film still featured on 1912 cover of The Moving Picture World
- Directed by: Sidney Olcott
- Written by: Gene Gauntier
- Produced by: Kalem Company
- Starring: Jack J. Clark; Gene Gauntier
- Cinematography: George K. Hollister
- Distributed by: General Films Company
- Release date: July 1, 1912
- Running time: 2000 ft
- Country: United States
- Languages: Silent film (English intertitles)

Tragedy of the Desert is a 1912 American silent film produced by Kalem Company and distributed by General Film Company. It was directed by Sidney Olcott with Gene Gauntier and Jack J. Clark in the leading roles.

== Cast ==
- Gene Gauntier
- Jack J. Clark
- J.P. McGowan
- Robert G. Vignola
- Alice Hollister

== Production notes ==
The film was shot in Luxor, Egypt.
