= The Kerry Gow =

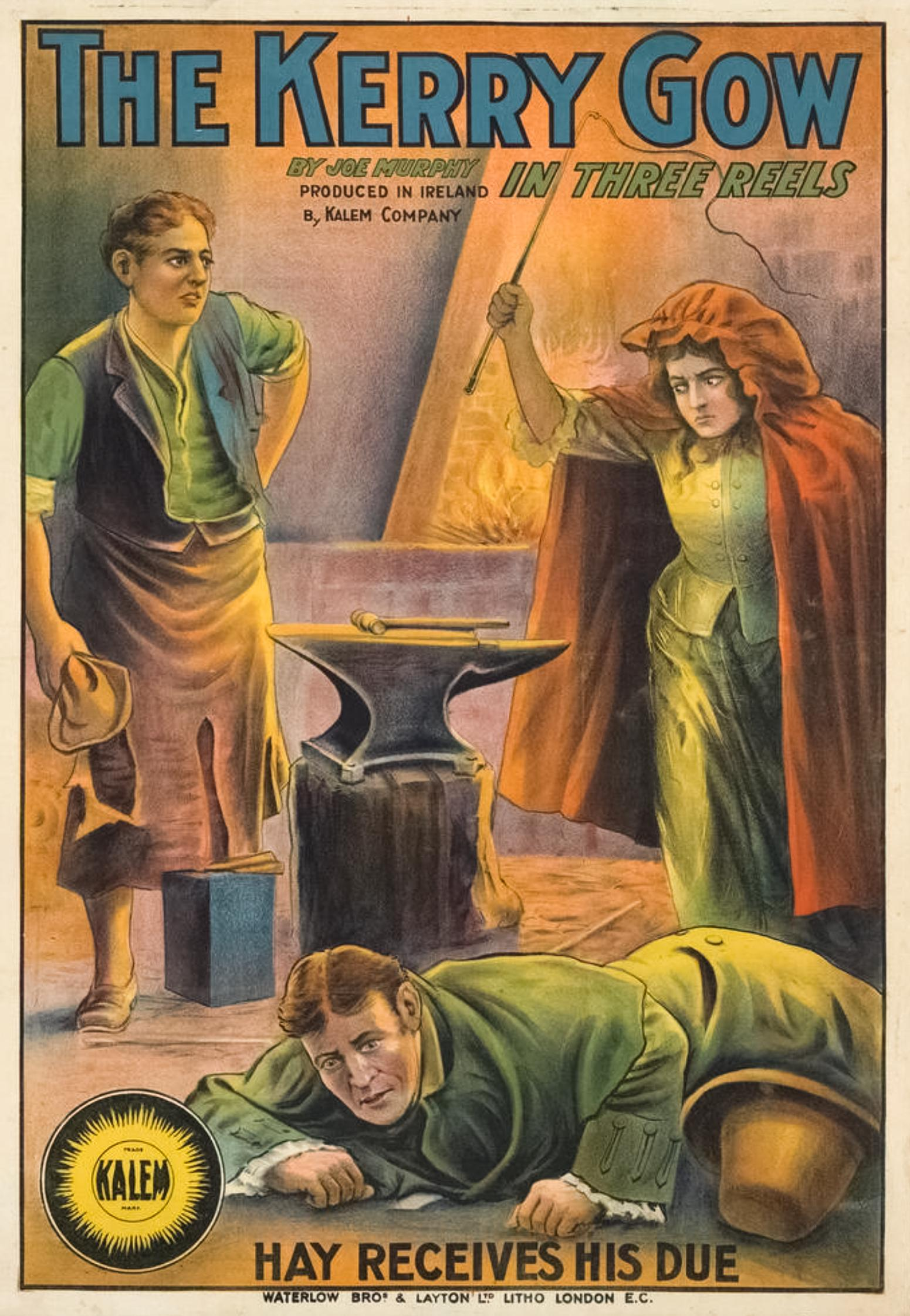
- Directed by: Sidney Olcott
- Written by: Gene Gauntier
- Based on: play The Kerry Gow by Fred Marsden
- Produced by: Kalem Company
- Starring: Alice Hollister; Jack J. Clark
- Cinematography: George K. Hollister
- Distributed by: General Film Company
- Release date: November 18, 1912
- Running time: 3000 ft, 3 reels
- Country: United States
- Languages: Silent film (English intertitles)

The Kerry Gow is a 1912 American silent film produced by Kalem Company and distributed by General Film Company. It was directed by Sidney Olcott with Alice Hollister and Jack J. Clark in the leading roles.

== Cast ==
- Alice Hollister - Nora Drew
- Jack J. Clark - Dan O'Hara
- J. P. McGowan - Valentine Hay
- Robert Vignola - Darby O'Drive
- Jack Melville - Jack Drew
- Eddie O'Sullivan - Patrick Drew
- Sidney Olcott - Captain Kiernan
- George Lester - Major Gruff
- Sonny O'Sullivan - Dinny Doyle
- Helen Lindroth - Alice Doyle

== Production notes ==
The film was shot in Beaufort, County Kerry, Ireland, during the summer of 1912.
