= When Lovers Part =

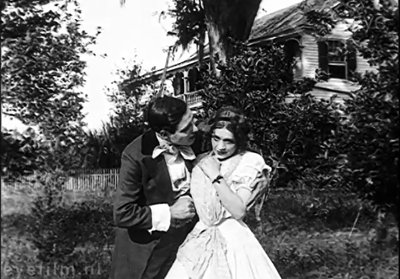
- Jack J. Clark and Gene Gauntier
- Directed by: Sidney Olcott
- Produced by: Sidney Olcott
- Starring: Gene Gauntier; Jack J. Clark; J. P. McGowan; Robert Vignola
- Cinematography: George K. Hollister
- Production company: Kalem Company
- Distributed by: General Film Company
- Release date: December 23, 1910
- Running time: 985 ft
- Country: United States
- Languages: Silent (English intertitles)

When Lovers Part is an 1910 American silent drama film produced by Kalem Company and directed by Sidney Olcott with Gene Gauntier, Jack J. Clark, Robert Vignola and J. P. McGowan in the leading roles.

A copy is kept in the Desmet collection at Eye Film Institute (Amsterdam).

== Plot ==
In the Antebellum South, Nell is banned from seeing her lover by her father. They decide to elope, but their plans are thwarted by the father. When the American Civil War begins both Nell's father and former lover enlist the Confederate Army. Nell's father returns and her lover is traumatized and matured by the war, and at her father's funeral Nell finally accepts his hand in marriage.

== Cast ==
- Gene Gauntier - Nell
- Jack J. Clark -
- Robert Vignola - Back servant
- J. P. McGowan - Nell's father

== Production notes ==
The film was shot in Jacksonville, Florida.
