= The Vampire's Trail =

American silent drama film

- Directed by: T. Hayes Hunter; Robert G. Vignola
- Screenplay by: Benjamin Barondess; T. Hayes Hunter; Michael Potter; Robert G. Vignola
- Starring: Alice Joyce; Tom Moore; Alice Hollister; Harry F. Millarde; Robert Walker
- Release date: August 3, 1914
- Running time: 26 minutes
- Country: United States
- Language: English

The Vampire's Trail is a 1914 American silent drama film directed by T. Hayes Hunter and Robert G. Vignola and written by Benjamin Barondess, T. Hayes Hunter, Michael Potter and Robert G. Vignola.

The film stars Alice Joyce, Tom Moore, Alice Hollister, Harry F. Millarde and Robert Walker.

== Plot ==
A young mother wants to be with her child so much that she is cross to her husband when he asks her to spend a pleasant evening with him away from home. The husband in consequence seeking diversion and relief from business cares alone, drifts away from her.

== Cast ==
- Alice Joyce as Laura Payne - Horace's Wife
- Tom Moore as Horace Payne - a Wealthy Broker
- Alice Hollister as Rita Caselli - a Cabaret Singer
- Harry F. Millarde as Phil Olcott - Horace's Friend (as Harry Millarde)
- Robert Walker as John Dugan - a Reporter
