= Alice Eis =

American dancer

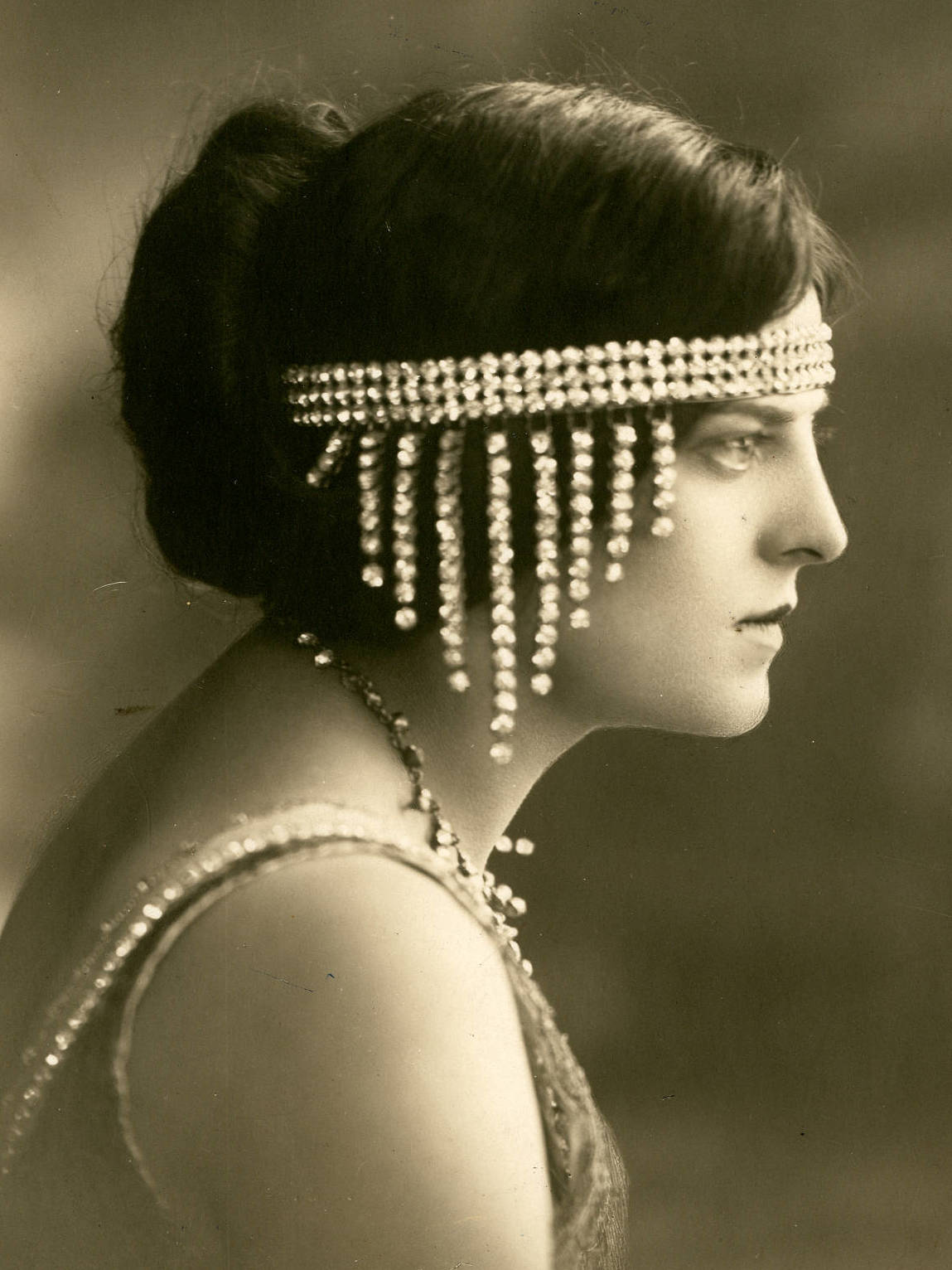
- Alice Eis in 1914
- Born: Gertrude Alice Eis; November 9, 1889; Dayton, Ohio, U.S.
- Died: December 21, 1956 (age 67); Queens, New York, U.S.
- Other names: Alice Eis French, Alice de Sevelinges
- Occupation: Dancer
- Notable work: The Vampire (1913)

Gertrude Alice Eis (November 9, 1889 – December 21, 1956) was an American dancer who appeared on vaudeville programs, in London and Paris, and in one silent film, The Vampire (1913).

== Early life and education ==
Eis was born in Dayton, Ohio, the daughter of George Eis and Alice Eis. Her father left the family when Eis was three years old.

== Career ==
=== Stage ===
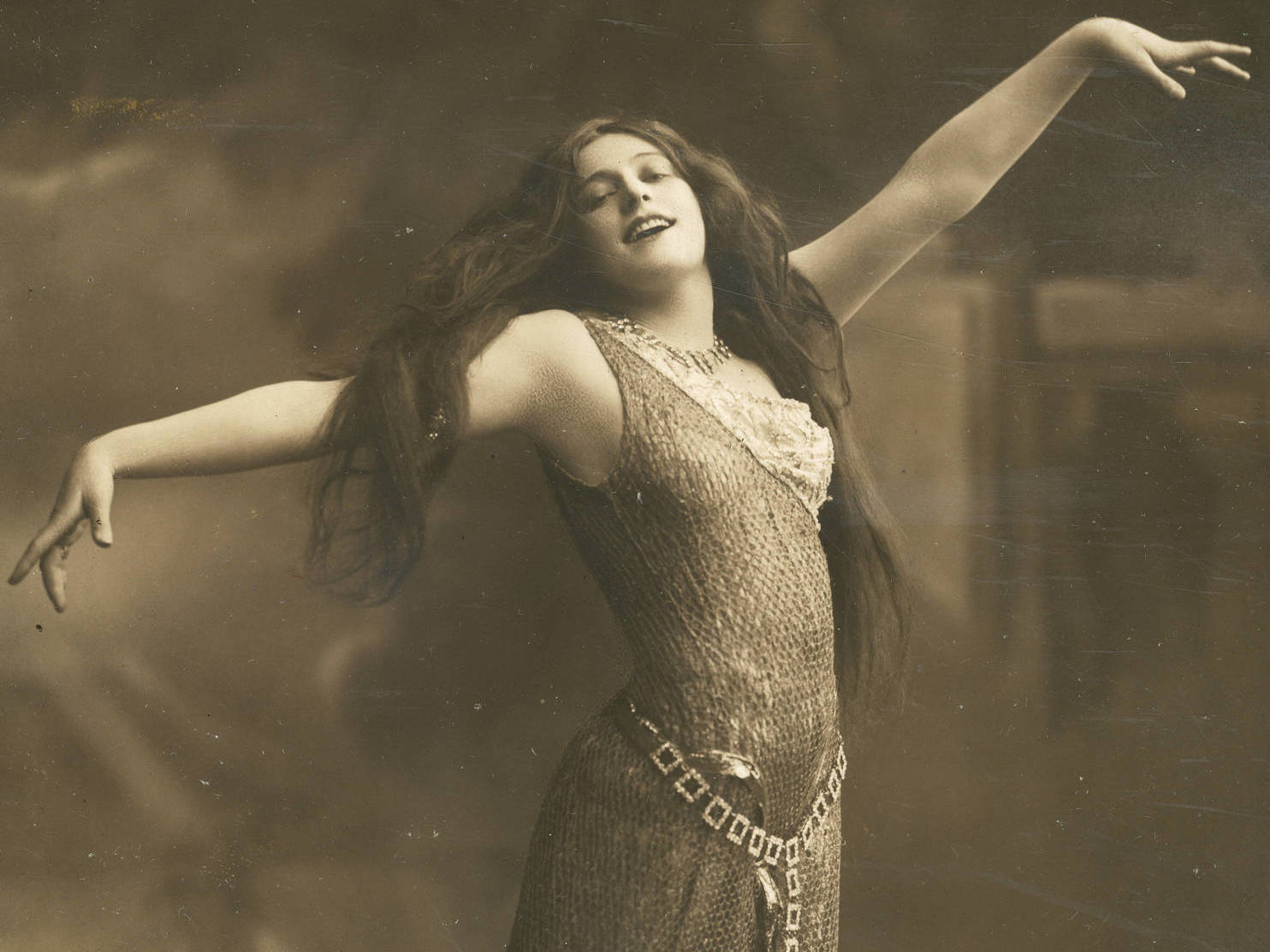
Vaudeville dancer Alice Eis (SAYRE 22978)

Eis was a dancer. Her Broadway credits included Wonderland (1905), Fascinating Flora (1907), and Nearly a Hero (1908). On the vaudeville stage, she was known for performing "daring" dances in revealing costumes, with her partner, Bert French.

"To call it a dance is a libel against the name of art," declared the New York Dramatic Mirror of the suggestive French and Eis act. The couple danced in London in 1910, and at the Folies Bergère in Paris in 1911 and 1912. "Miss Eis wears as few clothes as the police will permit," reported a Los Angeles publication in 1914. "She is a serpentine creature, electrically alive from her hair to her bare toes, and she writhes with a sinuous grace that is as wonderful as it is repellent."

In "The Dance of Fortune" (1913), Eis wore a costume that was mostly transparent, with "a startling display of bare legs," according to Variety. In response to criticisms of her too-revealing costumes, Eis and French created a dance set in the Arctic, titled "The Lure of the North" (1915). Their "Dance of the Temptress" (1915) was sea-themed and "spectacular", but possibly more pantomime than dance. Eis and French headlined a Halloween-themed dance and pantomime performance at the Columbia Theatre in 1916.

French left the stage to become a manager and producer; Eis danced with Joe Niemeyer in 1918. She was billed as "formerly of French and Eis" when she performed a five-part dance act with a new partner, James Templeton, in 1919. "Templeton's unison of motion with Miss Eis is accomplished with such skill that the shadow illusion is startling," wrote a San Francisco reviewer that year.

=== Film ===
Eis and French appeared in the silent film The Vampire (1913), performing their "The Vampire Dance". Her onscreen portrayal of a female vampire predated Theda Bara's in A Fool There Was (1915).

== Personal life ==
Eis hosted a dog show and garden party at her Annadale home in 1917. She married her dance partner, choreographer Bert French, in 1917. They had three children, Richard, Elaine, and Barbara. French died in 1924. She married French-born businessman Jean de Sevelinges in 1925. She died in 1956, at the age of 67, in Queens, New York.
