= The Girl Spy: An Incident of the Civil War =

1909 film by Sidney Olcott

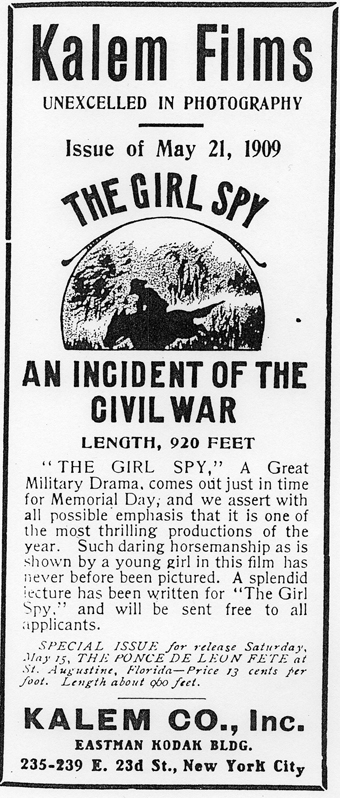
- The Moving Picture World, Vol 4, n°20, p 623, 1909, May 21
- Directed by: Sidney Olcott
- Produced by: Sidney Olcott
- Starring: Gene Gauntier
- Production company: Kalem Company
- Distributed by: General Film Company
- Release date: May 21, 1909
- Running time: 920 ft
- Country: United States
- Languages: Silent film (English intertitles)

The Girl Spy: An Incident of the Civil War is a 1909 American silent film produced by Kalem Company and directed by Sidney Olcott with Gene Gauntier in the leading role. A story of the U.S. Civil War, it is the first in The Girl Spy series.

== Plot ==
An intercepted military dispatch is delivered by Nan to a Confederate General.

== Cast ==
- Gene Gauntier as Nan, The Girl Spy
- Captain Jackson
- General

== Production notes ==
The film was shot in Jacksonville, Florida. The film length is variously reported as 865, 920 or 1,005 ft.

A copy is kept in the Library and Archives of Canada (Ottawa).
