= The Colonel's Son =

- Directed by: Sidney Olcott
- Produced by: Sidney Olcott
- Starring: Gene Gauntier; Jack J. Clark
- Cinematography: George K. Hollister
- Production company: Kalem Company
- Distributed by: General Film Company
- Release date: August 5, 1911
- Running time: 973 ft
- Country: United States
- Languages: Silent film (English intertitles)

The Colonel's Son is an American silent film produced by Kalem Company and directed by Sidney Olcott with Gene Gauntier and Jack J. Clark in the leading roles. The action takes place during the American Civil War.

== Cast ==
- Gene Gauntier
- Jack J. Clark

== Production notes ==
- The film was shot in Jacksonville, Florida.
