= Ireland, the Oppressed =

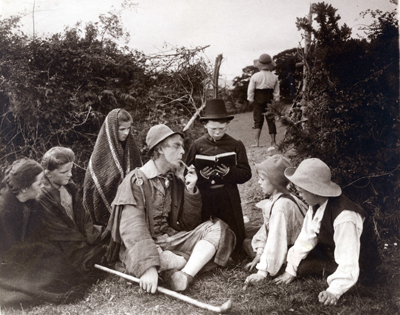
- Directed by: Sidney Olcott
- Written by: Gene Gauntier
- Produced by: Kalem Company
- Starring: Sidney Olcott; Jack J. Clark; Alice Hollister
- Distributed by: General Film Company
- Release date: December 25, 1912
- Running time: 1000 ft
- Country: United States
- Languages: Silent; English intertitles

Ireland, the Oppressed is a 1912 American silent film produced by Kalem Company and distributed by General Film Company. It was directed by Sidney Olcott with himself, Jack J. Clark and Alice Hollister.

== Cast ==
- Jack J. Clark -
- Alice Hollister - her sweetheart
- Sidney Olcott - Father Falvey
- Robert Vignola - Michael Dee
- J.P. McGowan - Major

== Production notes ==
- The film was shot in Beaufort, County Kerry, Ireland during the summer of 1912.
