= The Vampire (1913 film) =

1913 film by Robert G. Vignola

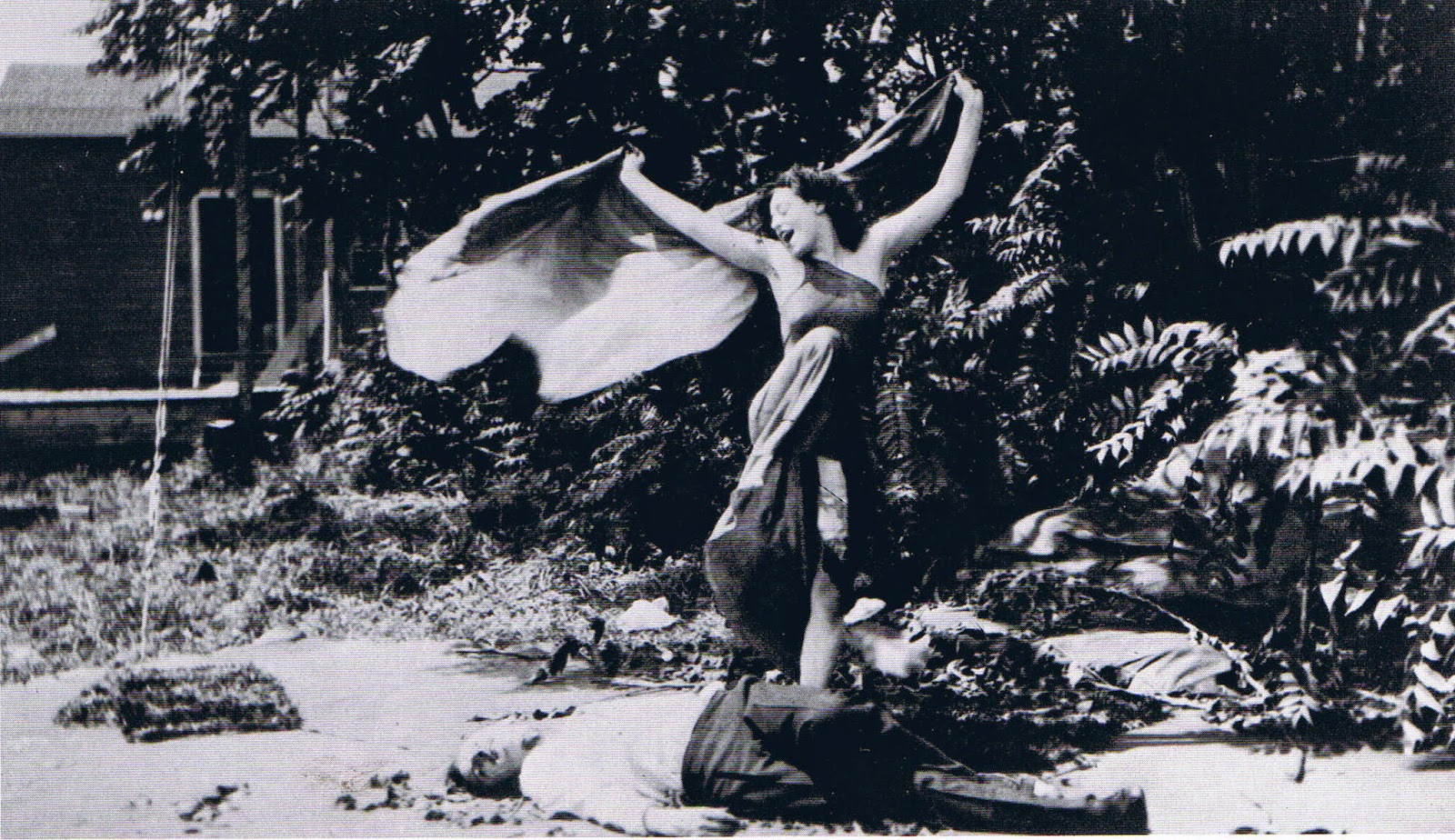
- Alice Eis and Bert French performing the "Vampire Dance"
- Directed by: Robert G. Vignola
- Written by: T. Hayes Hunter; Robert G. Vignola
- Starring: Alice Hollister; Harry F. Millarde
- Cinematography: George K. Hollister
- Production company: Kalem Company
- Distributed by: General Film Company
- Release date: 15 October 1913
- Running time: 38 minutes
- Country: United States
- Languages: Silent film (English intertitles)

The Vampire is an American silent film drama, directed by Robert G. Vignola, based on the 1897 eponymous poem by Rudyard Kipling. It stars Alice Hollister and Harry F. Millarde. It is generally considered the first recognized film depicting the vamp character, also known as femme fatale.

== Plot ==
Tired of rural life, Harold moves to the city for a new job, where he meets a woman named Sybil. He becomes completely infatuated with her, neglecting his fiancée, Helen. In reality, Sybil is a vamp destined to ruin his life. After losing his job and falling into alcoholism, he is ultimately abandoned by her. Harold goes to the theatre planning to rob some wealthy person to fund his obsession with Sybil. While there, he attends a performance of the "Vampire Dance", a piece depicting a man dominated and eventually bitten to death by a beautiful woman. This chilling parallel awakens Harold to his own weakness, prompting him to seek redemption. At last, he reunites with Helen, who had desperately searched for him after his departure.

== Cast ==
- Harry F. Millarde as Harold
- Marguerite Courtot as Helen
- Alice Hollister as Sybil the Vampire
- Henry Hallam as Martin
- Bert French and Alice Eis as the dancers
- Robert G. Vignola (uncredited)

== Production ==
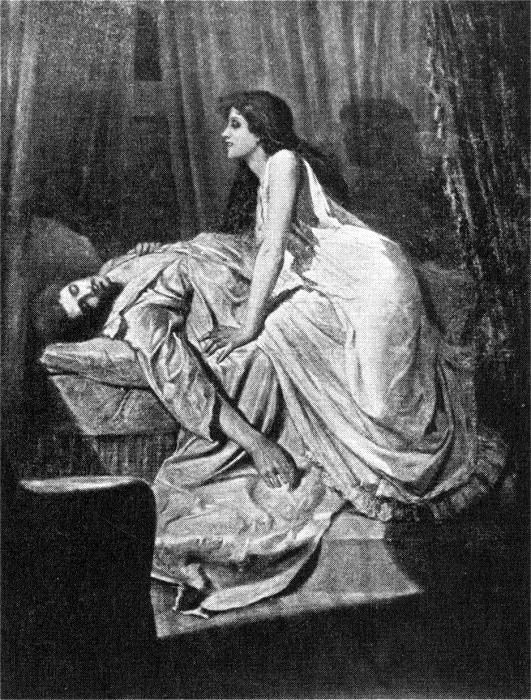
The Vampire, Philip Burne-Jones (1897)

The Vampire was shot in Cliffside Park, New Jersey.

The highlight of the production is the presence of dancers Alice Eis and Bert French performing their "Vampire Dance", inspired by Philip Burne-Jones painting The Vampire (1897). A still of the performance recreates the exact features of the painting. "The Vampire Dance" was famous and controversial at the time in the American vaudeville circuit for its provocative poses, before it was documented as part of the film.

On February 20, 1913 the dancers scandalised authorities with their number "Le rouge et noir" and were arrested on obscenity charges the next day, later freed on $500 bail each. Eis and French were paid $2,000 by the Kalem executives to immortalise the "Vampire Dance".

== Reception ==
The New York Dramatic Mirror wrote: "The acting of Miss Hollister as the adventuress in handling the different situations with the hero stands out. The director has carried detail to a fine point and very artistically. Photography good."

The Moving Picture World stated: "It is well acted and in photography is, for the most part, above criticism."

== Preservation status ==
Previously considered to be a lost film, a print exists in the George Eastman Museum film archive. It is often cited as the oldest "vamp" movie in existence since earlier pictures, like the 1910 short film of the same name starring Margarita Fischer and produced by William Nicholas Selig, are considered lost.

== See also ==
- Femme fatale
- Vampire films
