= Her Chum's Brother =

- Directed by: Sidney Olcott
- Produced by: Sidney Olcott
- Starring: Gene Gauntier; Robert Vignola; Jack J. Clark
- Cinematography: George K. Hollister
- Production company: Kalem Company
- Distributed by: General Film Company
- Release date: January 18, 1910
- Running time: 980 ft
- Country: United States
- Languages: Silent film (English intertitles)

Her Chum's Brother is an American silent film produced by Kalem Company and directed by Sidney Olcott with Gene Gauntier, Jack J. Clark and Robert Vignola in the leading roles.

== Cast ==
- Gene Gauntier -
- Jack J. Clark -
- Robert Vignola -

== Production notes ==
The film was shot in Jacksonville, Florida.
