= Belle Boyd =

American Confederate spy (1844–1900)

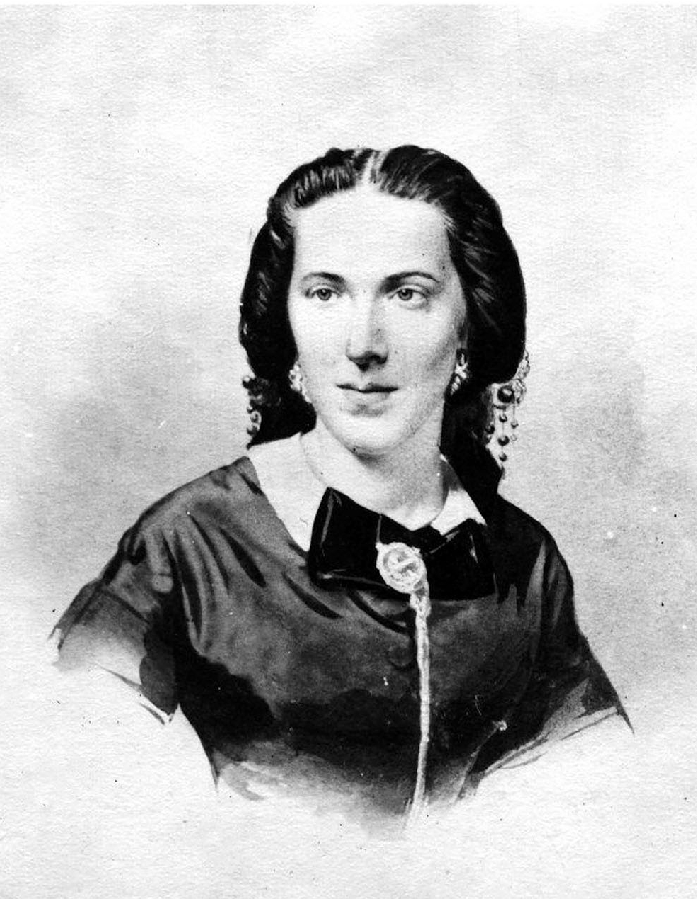
- Boyd in c. 1870
- Born: Maria Isabella Boyd; May 9, 1844; Martinsburg, Virginia (now West Virginia), US
- Died: June 11, 1900 (aged 56); Wisconsin Dells, Wisconsin, US
- Other names: Belle Boyd, Cleopatra of the Secession, Siren of the Shenandoah, La Belle Rebelle, Rebel Joan of Arc
- Occupation: Confederate Spy

Maria Isabella Boyd (May 9, 1844 – June 11, 1900), best known as Belle Boyd (and dubbed the Cleopatra of the Secession or Siren of the Shenandoah, and later the Confederate Mata Hari) was a Confederate spy in the American Civil War. She operated from her father's hotel in Front Royal, Virginia, and provided valuable information to Confederate General Stonewall Jackson in 1862.

== Early life ==
Maria Isabella "Belle" Boyd was born on May 9, 1844, in Martinsburg, Virginia (now part of West Virginia). She was the eldest child of Benjamin Reed and Mary Rebecca (Glenn) Boyd. She described her childhood as idyllic. After some preliminary schooling in Martinsburg, she attended finishing school at the Mount Washington Female College in Baltimore, Maryland in 1856 at age 12.

=== Belle Boyd House ===
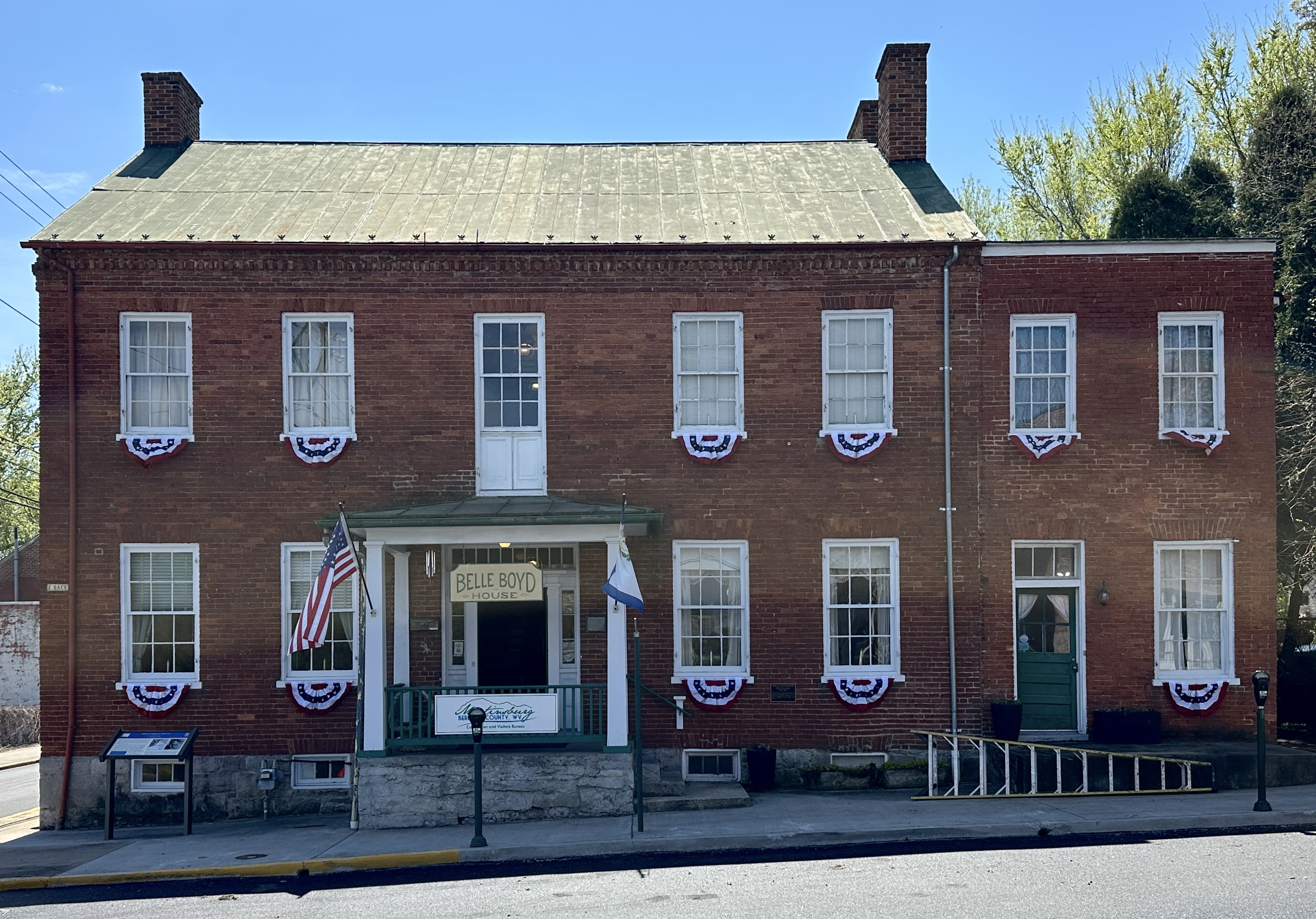
The Belle Boyd House in 2026

The Belle Boyd House was the residence of Belle Boyd and her family in the Downtown Martinsburg Historic District. It was built by Benjamin Reed in a Greek Revival style. The building currently resides as a museum for the Berkeley County Historical Society.

The Belle Boyd House is two-story Greek Revival style brick mansion. It is made up of five bays with a gable roof and a 6/6 slash. Interior chimneys reside at each end of the house, extruding out of the cornice which is flush and beaded. The framework is made up of stepped brickwork over a dentil course and stretchers. The windows have a flat top with wide, gauge bricked arches, one stretcher and header deep. This is surrounded by a wooded sash, which is beaded over. The entrance is one bay and centered around an extant porch which includes tapered posts and hipped roofing, with these details not being original. An opening used to exist to a furnished second level, but it was paneled at the bottom. The doorway used to have two vertical panels and pilasters, made evident by a full transom and three-light sidelights over raised panels.

On February 25, 1853, Reed bought lot 50 in Martinsburg for $350, which faced Race and Spring Street. Reed completed construction on the house by the end of that year. After his family moved in, Reed began to start on a storeroom, which became a merchandise store. Reed lost ownership of the house in November 1855. (Note: However, the Berkeley County Historical Society stated that Ben lost ownership in 1857.) The house was renovated multiple times before becoming a four-room apartment. The house was planned to be a parking lot, which was later halted by the Martinsburg City Council. It then became purchased by the Berkeley County Historical Society.

== Southern spy ==
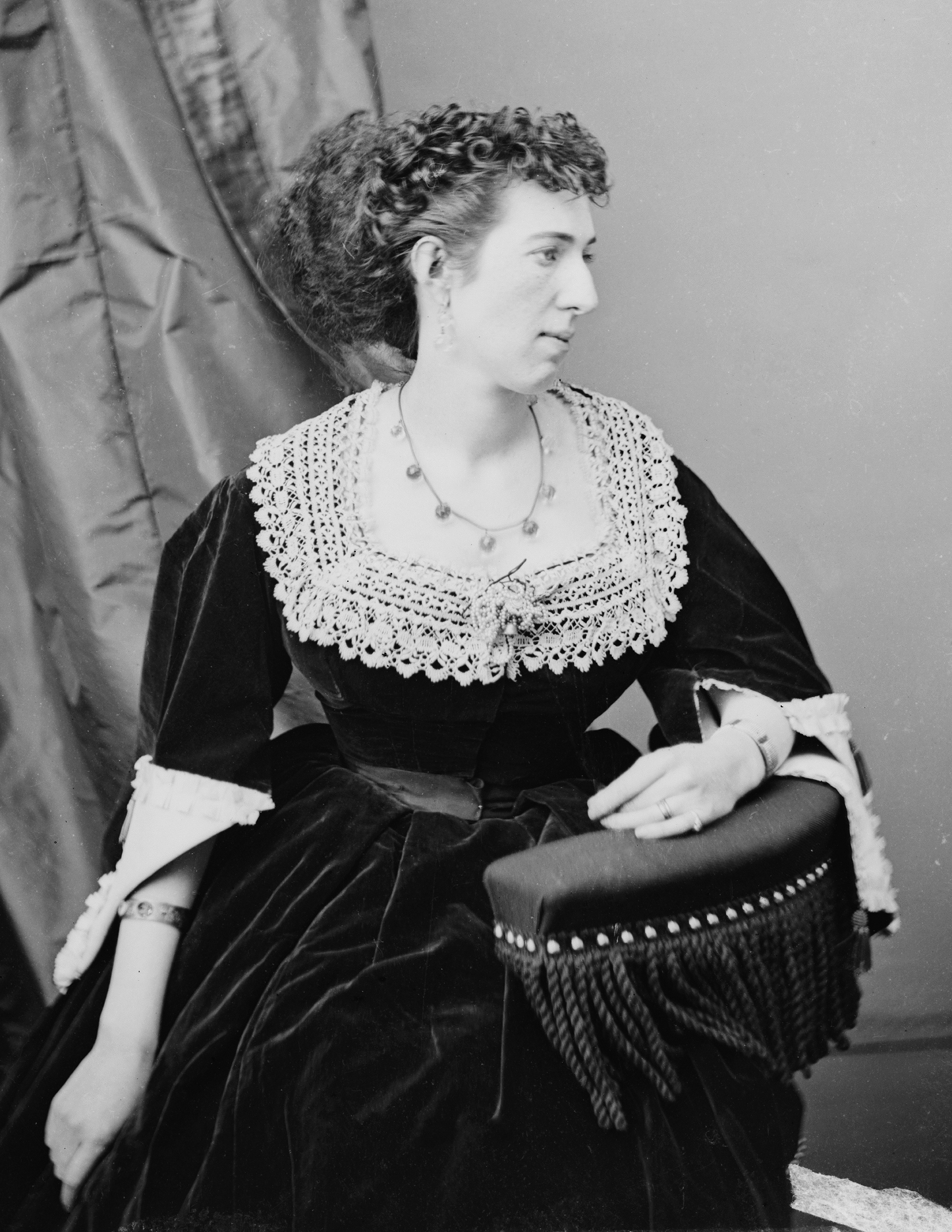
Belle Boyd (age 21), Confederate spy (circa 1865).

Boyd's espionage career began by chance. According to her 1866 account, a band of Union army soldiers heard that she had Confederate flags in her room on July 4, 1861, and they came to investigate. They hung a Union flag outside her home. Then one of the men cursed at her mother, which enraged Boyd. She pulled out a pistol and shot the man, who died some hours later. A board of inquiry exonerated her of murder, but sentries were posted around the house and officers kept close track of her activities. She profited from this enforced familiarity, charming at least one of the officers whom she named in her memoir as Captain Daniel Keily,

She wrote in her memoir that she was indebted to Keily "for some very remarkable effusions, some withered flowers, and a great deal of important information." She conveyed those secrets to Confederate officers via her slave Eliza Hopewell, who carried them in a hollowed-out watch case. Boyd was caught on her first attempt at spying and told that she could be sentenced to death.

General James Shields and his staff gathered in the parlor of the local hotel in mid-May 1862. Boyd hid in the closet in the room, eavesdropping through a knothole that she enlarged in the door. She learned that Shields had been ordered east from Front Royal, Virginia. That night, she rode through Union lines, using false papers to bluff her way past the sentries, and reported the news to Colonel Turner Ashby, who was scouting for the Confederates. She then returned to town. When the Confederates advanced on Front Royal on May 23, Boyd ran to greet Stonewall Jackson's men, avoiding enemy fire that put bullet holes in her skirt, as according to her memoir. She urged an officer, Henry Kyd Douglas, to inform Jackson that "the Yankee force is very small [...] Tell him to charge right down and he will catch them all."

Jackson did and wrote a note of gratitude to her: "I thank you, for myself and for the army, for the immense service that you have rendered your country today." For her contributions, she was awarded the Southern Cross of Honor. Jackson also gave her captain and honorary aide-de-camp positions.

Boyd was arrested at least six times but somehow evaded incarceration. By late July 1862, detective Allan Pinkerton had assigned three men to work on her case. She was finally captured by Union officials on July 29, 1862, after her lover gave her up, and they brought her to the Old Capitol Prison in Washington, D.C. the next day. An inquiry was held on August 7, 1862, concerning violations of orders that Boyd be kept in close custody. She was held for a month before being released on August 29, 1862, when she was exchanged at Fort Monroe. She was arrested again in June 1863, but was released after contracting typhoid fever.

In March 1864, Boyd attempted to travel to England, but she was intercepted by a Union blockade and sent to Canada where she met Union naval officer Samuel Wylde Hardinge. The two married in England. and had a daughter, Grace. Boyd became an actress in England after her husband's death to support her daughter. Following the death of her husband in 1866, she and her daughter returned to the United States.

Boyd assumed the stage name Nina Benjamin to perform in several cities, eventually ending up in New Orleans where she married John Swainston Hammond in March 1869, a former British Army officer who fought for the Union Army during the Civil War. They had two sons and two daughters; their first son died as an infant. Boyd divorced Hammond in 1884 and married Nathaniel Rue High in 1885. She subsequently began touring the country giving dramatic lectures of her life as a Civil War spy.

== Postwar years and death ==
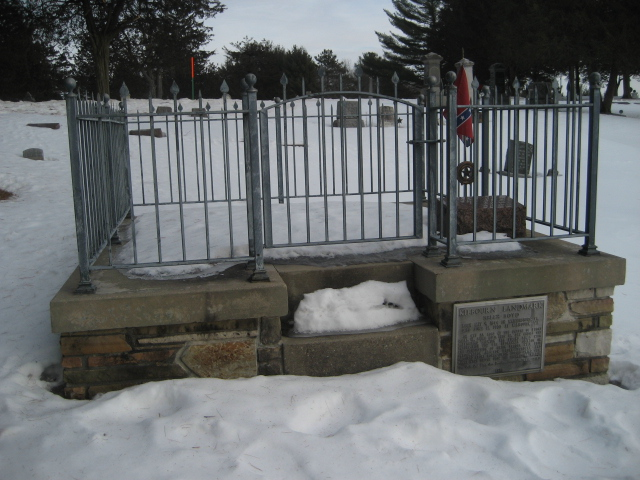
Belle Boyd's grave

Boyd published a highly fictionalized narrative of her war experiences in the two-volume Belle Boyd in Camp and Prison. She died of a heart attack in Kilbourn City, Wisconsin (Wisconsin Dells) on June 11, 1900, at age 56. She was buried in the Spring Grove Cemetery in Wisconsin Dells, with members of the Grand Army of the Republic as her pallbearers. For years, her grave simply read:

BELLE BOYD
CONFEDERATE SPY
BORN IN VIRGINIA
DIED IN WISCONSIN
ERECTED BY A COMRADE

== In popular culture ==
- Boyd's life inspired the silent film series The Girl Spy.
- The Smiling Rebel (1955) is a Harnett Kane novel about Boyd.
- Boyd is a main character in the Cherie Priest steampunk novel Clementine (2010) and its sequel Fiddlehead (2013).
- Boyd appears as a master-spy in the Firaxis computer game Civilization 4 Beyond The Sword.

== See also ==
- American Civil War spies
- Hattie Lawton
- Kate Warne

== Bibliography ==
- Abbott, Karen (2014). Liar, Temptress, Soldier, Spy: Four Women Undercover in the Civil War. HarperCollins. ISBN 978-0062092892. OCLC 878667621.
- Bakeless, John. Spies of the Confederacy. Mineola, N.Y.: Dover Publications, 1997.
- Boyd, Belle. Belle Boyd in Camp and Prison. New York: Blelock, 1867.
- Harnett Thomas Kane, The Smiling Rebel (Garden City, New York: Doubleday, 1955).
- Hay, Thomas Robson (1975). "Boyd, Belle". In James, Edward T.; et al. (eds.). Notable American Women, 1607–1950: A Biographical Dictionary. Vol. 1. Cambridge. Massachusetts: Belnlknap Press of Harvard University Press.
- History.info (2020-07-28). "1864: Capture of the Southern Spy Belle Boyd". History.info.
- Michals, Debra (2015). "Belle Boyd". National Women's History Museum.
- Sigaud, Louis A. (1944). Belle Boyd, Confederate Spy. Richmond, Virginia: Dietz Press. OCLC 425072.
- Sizer, Lyde Cullen (2000). "Belle Boyd". American National Biography. Oxford University Press. doi:10.1093/anb/9780198606697.article.0401228. ISBN 978-0-19-860669-7.
