= Lotta Crabtree =

American actress

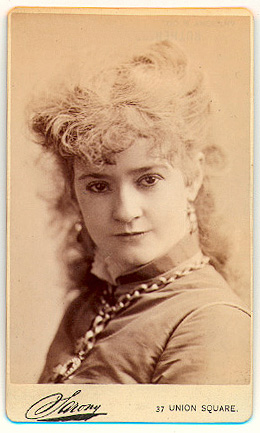
- Born: Charlotte Mignon Crabtree; November 7, 1847; New York City, U.S.
- Died: September 25, 1924 (aged 76); Boston, Massachusetts, U.S.
- Resting place: Woodlawn Cemetery
- Occupation: Actress
- Years active: 1853–1892

Charlotte Mignon "Lotta" Crabtree (November 7, 1847 – September 25, 1924), also known mononymously as Lotta, was an American actress, entertainer, comedian, and philanthropist. Born in New York City and raised in the gold mining hills of Northern California, she rose to fame as a child performer. Crabtree became one of the wealthiest and most beloved American entertainers of the late 19th century. From her beginnings as a 6-year-old until her retirement at age 45, she entertained and was named "The Nation's Darling". Her life story was filmed as Golden Girl (1951), starring Mitzi Gaynor.

== Early life ==
Charlotte Mignon Crabtree was born in New York City on November 7, 1847. Her father, John Ashworth Crabtree, a book seller, left for San Francisco in 1851 to join those seeking fortune in the California Gold Rush. Crabtree and her mother, Mary Ann (née Livesey) Crabtree, followed two years later, joining John in the boomtown of Grass Valley. While in Grass Valley, the Crabtrees ran a boarding house. Lotta soon attracted the attention of a neighbor, the dancer and actress Lola Montez, who encouraged Lotta's enthusiasm for performing.

The Crabtrees moved again and set up another boarding house, this time in Rabbit Creek, 40 miles north of Grass Valley. Soon after, Crabtree made her first professional appearance at a tavern in Rabbit Creek with support from the Robinson Family of performers. She began touring throughout the California mining camps making a name for herself as a dancer, singer, and banjo player.

In 1856, the family moved back to San Francisco. Rowena Granice Steele had established The Gaieties, Temple of Mirth and Song theater and saloon in that year, and Crabtree, her protege, was one of the early performers at that venue. By 1859, she had become "Miss Lotta, the San Francisco Favorite". Crabtree's mother served as her manager and collected all of Lotta's earnings in gold, carrying it in a large leather bag. When this became too heavy, it was transferred to a steamer trunk.

With the silver discovery in Nevada beginning in 1859, Crabtree became a recurring star after first appearing there in 1863. The embodiment of fun and frolic, Crabtree mugged for the audience, twisted her finger in her dimple, stuffed coins thrown on stage to her into the tops of her stockings, and overall personified the happy scamp. She had two brothers that were born a few years apart.

== Later career ==
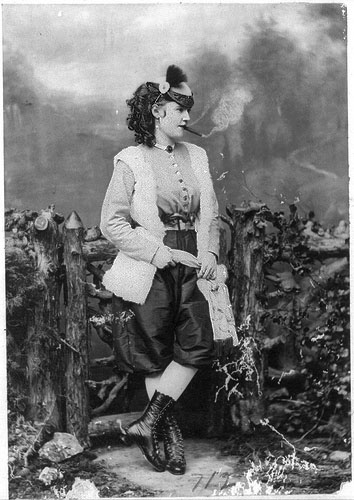
Lotta Crabtree, 1868 (Library of Congress)

Having made a name for herself in California, in 1864 Crabtree left to tour the East Coast, where she began acting in plays, in theaters, such as The Old Curiosity Shop, Uncle Tom's Cabin and Little Nell and the Marchioness.

With her petite stature, she became a favorite for her portrayals of children. The late 1860s would see the "Lotta Polka" and "Lotta Gallup" as quite the rage in America. At age 20, she was a national star. By 1875, she was touring the nation with her own theatrical company. She achieved the height of her success in the 1870s and 1880s. She starred in several successful plays written for by Fred Marsden, including Zip (1874) and Musette (1876).

The 1880s saw her perennially as the highest-paid actress in America, earning sums of up to $5,000 per week. Her mother Mary Ann was still managing Crabtree's affairs: booking plays, finding locations, and organizing troupes of actors. When the steamer trunk became too heavy, she invested Crabtree's earnings in local real estate, race horses and bonds. As well as investing, some of the money was used to support local charities (the Massachusetts Society for Aiding Discharged Prisoners – est. 1846 – still receives annual grants) and build fountains. Lotta's Fountain, the most famous of these fountains, still stands at the intersection of Market and Kearny streets in San Francisco, and is the site of meetings every April 18, marking the anniversary of the 1906 San Francisco earthquake.

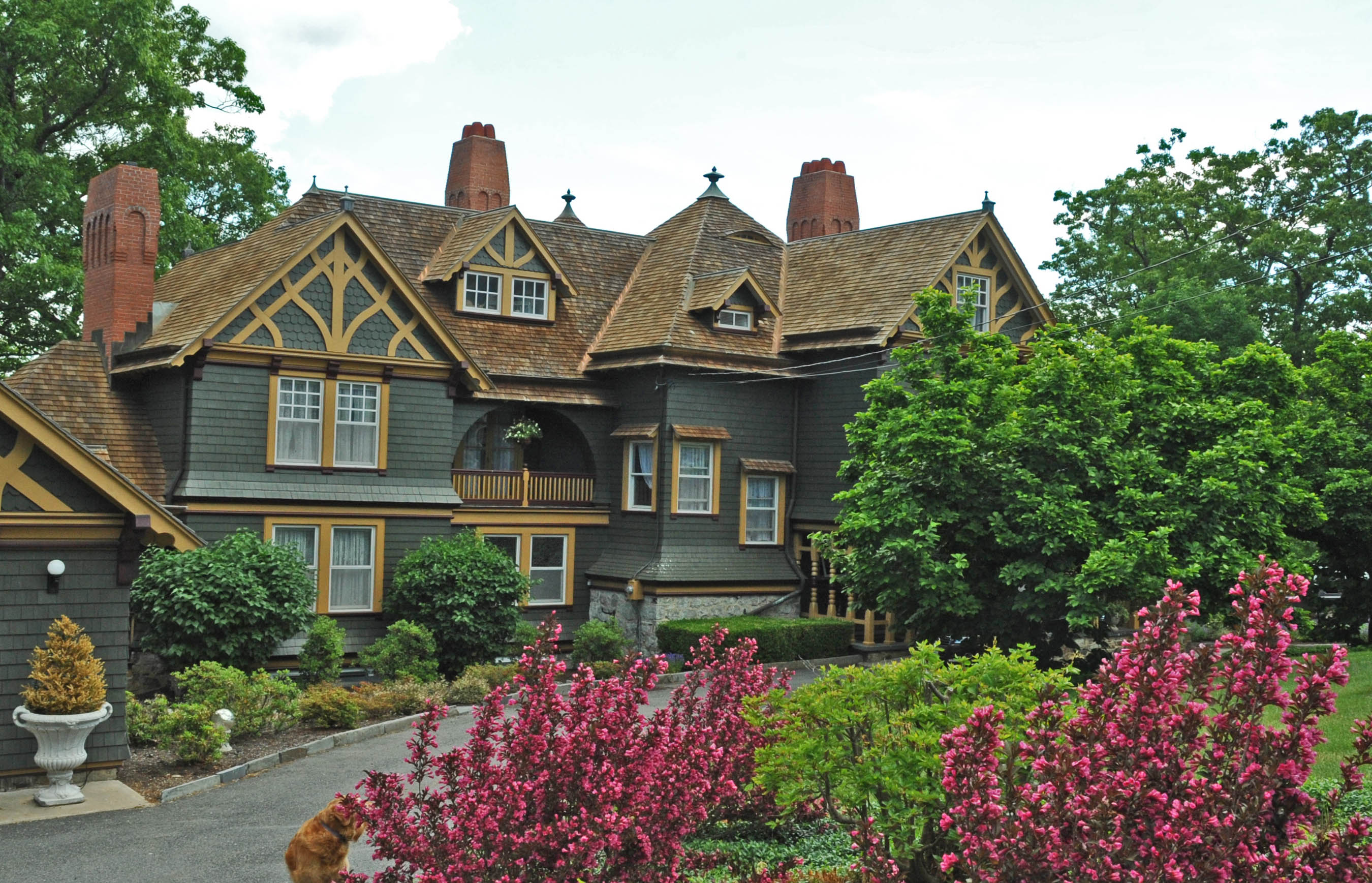
Attol Tryst, designed by Frank Furness

Crabtree traveled abroad with her mother and brothers. She learned French, visited museums and began painting. After her tour abroad, Crabtree returned to San Francisco where she played at the California Theatre, reprising her role in Little Nell and the Marchioness by John Bowen. Having missed her while she was away, the city responded warmly to her return and treated her like their very own star.

In 1885, Crabtree's mother had an 18-room summer cottage built in the Breslin Park section of Mount Arlington, New Jersey, on the shores of Lake Hopatcong. Named Attol Tryst (Lotta spelled backward), the house was designed by noted architect Frank Furness. Crabtree gave parties, rode horses, and pursued her painting. It stands today and in recent years has been restored.

== Retirement ==
Crabtree was forced to retire as a result of a fall onstage in Wilmington, Delaware, in May 1889. After recovering in Lake Hopatcong, she attempted a comeback in 1891, but a lack of public enthusiasm persuaded her to retire permanently from the stage. She later resisted calls for a farewell tour. At age 45, she was the richest actress in America, the theater was changing and she got out at the top. She made one final appearance in 1915 for Lotta Crabtree Day in San Francisco at the Panama-Pacific Exposition.

While Crabtree apparently had her share of romance, her travel, lifestyle, and mother made a long-term relationship difficult, and she never married. Following retirement, Crabtree traveled, painted (including studying at Paris in 1912) and was active in charitable work. Late in her life, Crabtree moved to Massachusetts and was owner of acreage in the southern part of the Squantum section of Quincy, immediately south of Boston, Massachusetts. It is said to have been purchased for the benefit and health of her brother (Ashworth) and for their horses. Much of the land was sold as house lots in the 1930s/40s. Children who walked to school through her land in those days often passed by two small markers of local granite set into the ground, engraved "Ruby Royal" and "Sonoma Girl" – two of the Crabtrees' horses. The stone for Ruby still exists on Livesey Road. Local street names include Ashworth Road, Livesey Road, Sonoma Road, and the shoreline Crabtree Road. Ashworth was a family surname, as was Livesey. Further information may be available through the Quincy, Massachusetts Historical Society.

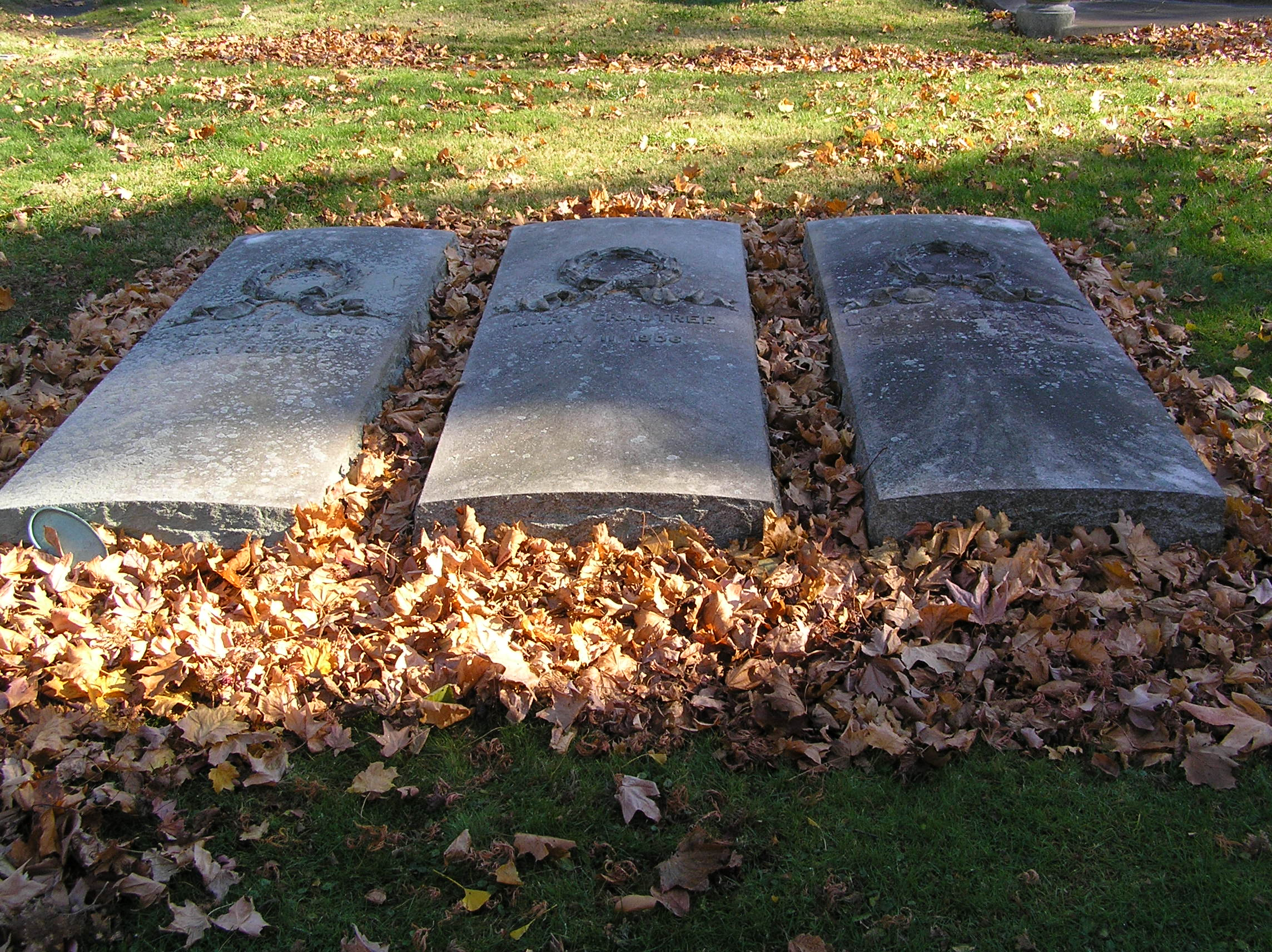
The gravesite of Lotta Crabtree in Woodlawn Cemetery

Crabtree spent the last 15 years of her life at the Brewster Hotel in Boston, which she had purchased in 1909. She died there on September 25, 1924, at age 76 from undisclosed causes. In her obituary, the New York Times called her the "eternal child". She was described by critics as mischievous, unpredictable, impulsive, rattlebrained, teasing, piquant, rollicking, cheerful, and devilish. She was interred at the Woodlawn Cemetery in Bronx, New York. She left an estate of some $4 million in a charitable trust for such causes as veterans, aging actors and animals. The estate ran into complications when a number of people unsuccessfully contested the will. The trust still exists today.

== Memorials ==
- Miss Lotta of Lake Hopatcong Cruises, a boat dedicated to Lotta Crabtree
- Crabtree Hall, a dormitory at the University of Massachusetts Amherst, is named for Lotta.
- Lotta's Fountain, Geary & Market Streets, San Francisco
- Lotta Fountain, Charles River Esplanade, Boston, sculptor Katharine Lane Weems, with architect Edwin Dodge, 1939
- Lotta Window (a stained glass window dedicated to her mother), St. Stephen's Episcopal Church, Chicago
- Attol Tryst, former summer residence, Lake Hopatcong, New Jersey, (not open to the public).

== In popular culture ==
- "Lotta Crabtree" is a two-act musical comedy set in the California Goldrush. It written by Gerald P. Murphy and is based on the early life of the singer. The show was published by Lazy Bee Scripts in 2010 and was first produced in Yreka, California in 1995 at the Siskiyou Performing Arts Center.
- Gloria Jean portrayed adult Crabtree and Sharon Baird as Young Lotta in a 1954 episode of the syndicated anthology series Death Valley Days. Her father failed at gold prospecting while her mother operated a boarding house. Crabtree was briefly under the tutelage of Lola Montez (Yvonne Cross). Paula Morgan played Montez in a subsequent 1955 Death Valley Days episode.
- Lotta Crabtree was portrayed by Mitzi Gaynor in the 1951 Twentieth Century Fox musical film Golden Girl. **In an ahistorical portrayal, in the first 1959 episode of the television show Bonanza, Crabtree, played by Yvonne De Carlo is hired by mining tycoon Alpheus Troy with the job of luring the youngest Cartwright son, Little Joe (Michael Landon), and holding him for ransom so Alpheus can purchase the timber that grew on the Ponderosa. In 1970, Crabtree appeared again, this time played by Sally Kellerman, searching for a stash of gold left behind in the earlier episode.

== Gallery ==
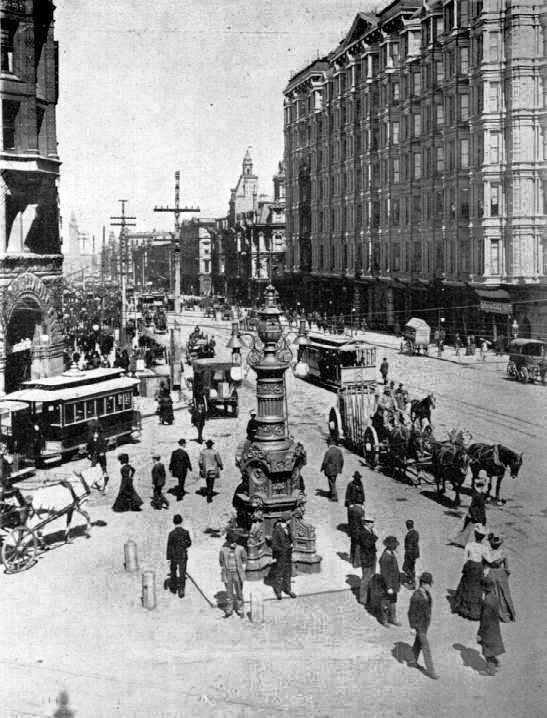
Lotta's Fountain, San Francisco, California (erected 1875; 1905 photo)

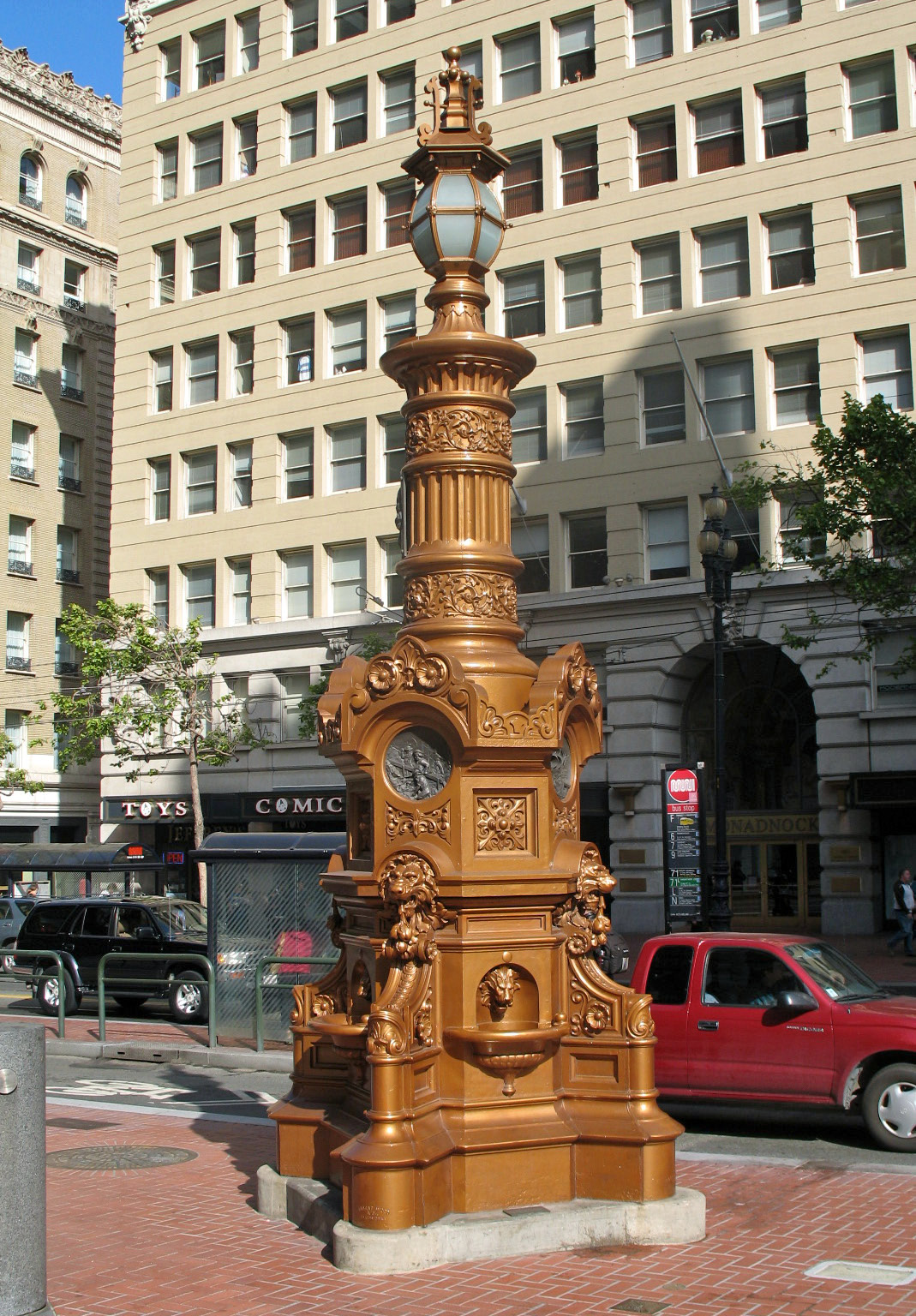
Lotta's Fountain, downtown San Francisco (2008 photo)

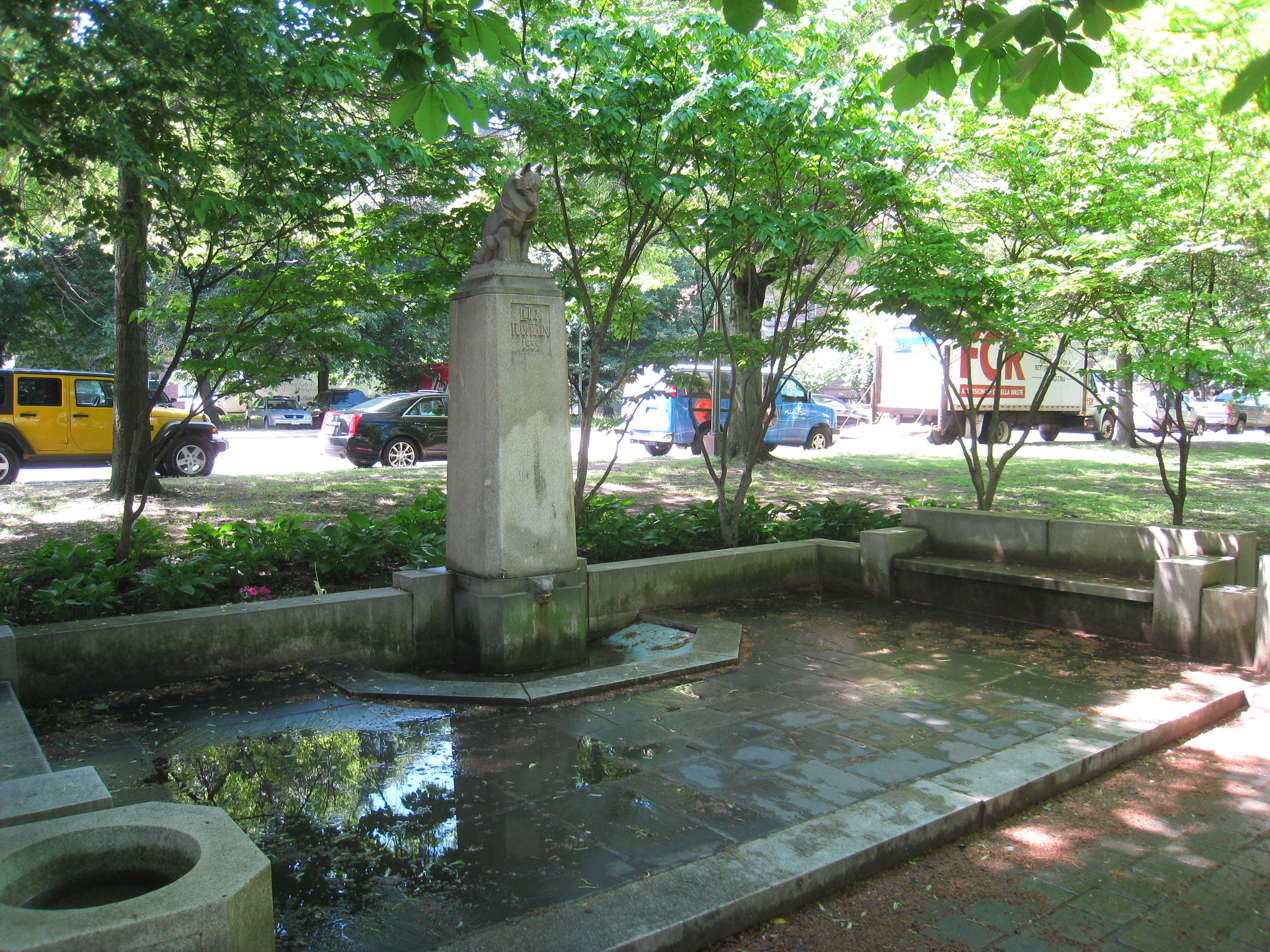
Lotta Fountain, Charles River Esplanade, near Berkeley Street, Boston (erected 1939; 2009 photo)

== Bibliography ==
- Dempsey, David K.; Baldwin, Raymond P. (1968). Triumphs and Trials of Lotta Crabtree. New York: William Morrow and Company. OCLC 654817464.
- Eichin, Carolyn Grattan, From San Francisco Eastward: Victorian Theater in the American West, (Reno: University of Nevada Press, 2020).
- Harris, Gloria G.; Hannah S. Cohen (2012). "Chapter 10. Entertainers – Lotta Crabtree: First American Superstar". Women Trailblazers of California: Pioneers to the Present. Charleston, SC: The History Press. pp. 151–66 [153–56]. ISBN 978-1609496753.
- Jackson, Phyllis Wynn (1949). Golden Footlights – Merry-making career of Lotta Crabtree. New York: Holiday House. OCLC 603182471.
- Mazow, Leo G.; Burns, Sarah (2005). Picturing the Banjo. University Park, Pa: Penn State University Press. OCLC 957592143.
- Rather, Lois (1979). Lotta's Fountain. Oakland, CA: Rather Press. OCLC 5158217.
- Watson, Margaret, Silver Theatre: Amusements of Nevada's Mining Frontier, 1850–1864, (Glendale, CA: The Arthur H. Clark Company, 1964).
