= Lotta's Fountain =

- Lotta Crabtree Fountain
- U.S. National Register of Historic Places
- San Francisco Designated Landmark

- Location within San Francisco County Location within California Location within the United States
- Location: Market, Geary, and Kearny Sts., San Francisco, California
- Coordinates: 37°47′17″N 122°24′13″W
- Area: 0.1 acres (0.040 ha)
- Built: 1875
- NRHP reference No.: 75000475
- SFDL No.: 73

Significant dates
- Added to NRHP: June 20, 1975
- Designated SFDL: 1975

Lotta's fountain is a fountain at the intersection of Market Street, where Geary and Kearny Streets connect in downtown San Francisco, California. It was commissioned by actress Lotta Crabtree in 1875 as a gift to the city of San Francisco, and would serve as a significant meeting point in the aftermath of the 1906 San Francisco earthquake and fire.

== History ==
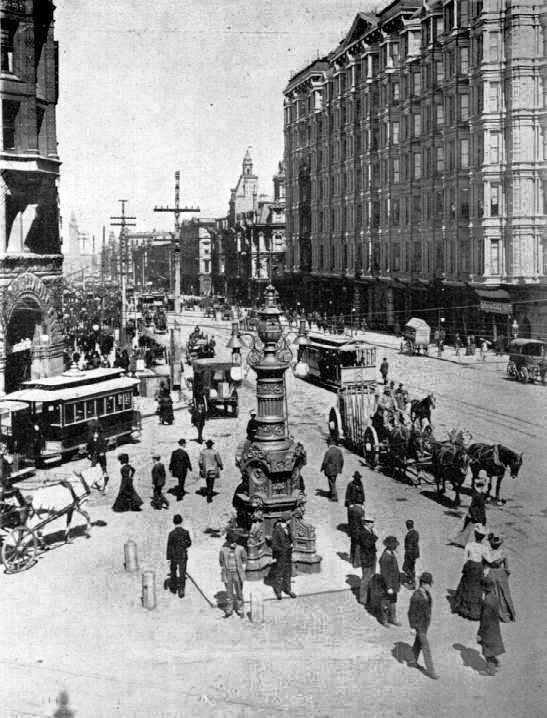
Lotta's Fountain in 1905, looking northeast along Market Street; the Palace Hotel is at right and the Ferry Building's clock tower is in the distance

The cast-iron fountain, commissioned by actress Lotta Crabtree as a gift to the city, was dedicated September 9, 1875. During its centennial it was designated both a San Francisco Designated Landmarks and the U.S. National Historic Places.

A plaque commemorates its role as a meeting point in the aftermath of the 1906 San Francisco earthquake and fire. Another plaque mentions the opera soprano Luisa Tetrazzini, who gave a memorable performance for the people of San Francisco at the fountain on Christmas Eve, 1910, after legal difficulties prevented her from appearing on stage. The bronze column was added in 1916 to match the height of new lights being installed along Market Street.

In 1974 it was relocated slightly from its original location at 3rd, Market and Kearny during the renovation of Market Street and brought into alignment with the "Path of Gold" streetlamps. In 1999 the fountain was refurbished, shortened back to its 1875 appearance, and repainted a metallic gold-brown. Its lion's-head spigots flow during daytime hours.

In 1919, a commemoration of the earthquake was started that still occurs annually. The South of Market Boys, a fraternal drinking organization, hung a wreath on the fountain. Since then, survivors of the earthquake gathered at 5:12 a.m. on April 18 at the intersection. After the 2015 anniversary, the last two survivors of the earthquake died. In 2016, more than 200 participants, many in period costuming, gathered to commemorate victims of the earthquake and to draw attention to earthquake preparedness.

== See also ==
- Lotta's Fountain, Charles River Esplanade, near Berkeley Street, Boston (erected 1939)
- Newspaper Row (San Francisco)
- Market and 3rd Street / Market and Kearny stations
- List of San Francisco Designated Landmarks

== Sources ==
- O'Brien, Robert This is San Francisco Chronicle Books 1994, reprint from 1948
