= The Mystery of Pine Creek Camp =

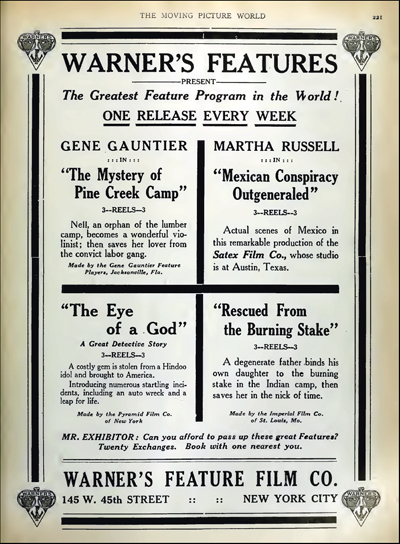
- Directed by: Sidney Olcott
- Written by: Gene Gauntier
- Produced by: Gene Gauntier Feature Players
- Starring: Gene Gauntier; Jack J. Clark; Arthur Donaldson
- Distributed by: Warner's Features
- Release date: April 1913
- Running time: 3000 ft
- Country: United States
- Languages: Silent film (English intertitles)

The Mystery of Pine Creek Camp is a 1913 American silent film produced by Gene Gauntier Feature Players and distributed by Warner's Features. It was directed by Sidney Olcott with himself, Gene Gauntier, Jack J. Clark and Arthur Donaldson in the leading roles.

== Cast ==
- Gene Gauntier
- Jack J. Clark
- Sidney Olcott
- Arthur Donaldson

== Production notes ==
- The film was shot in Jacksonville, Fla.
