= Lotta Crabtree Cottage =

Shingle style house in Mount Arlington, New Jersey, built in the 1880s

Coordinates: 40°55′57″N 74°38′03″W

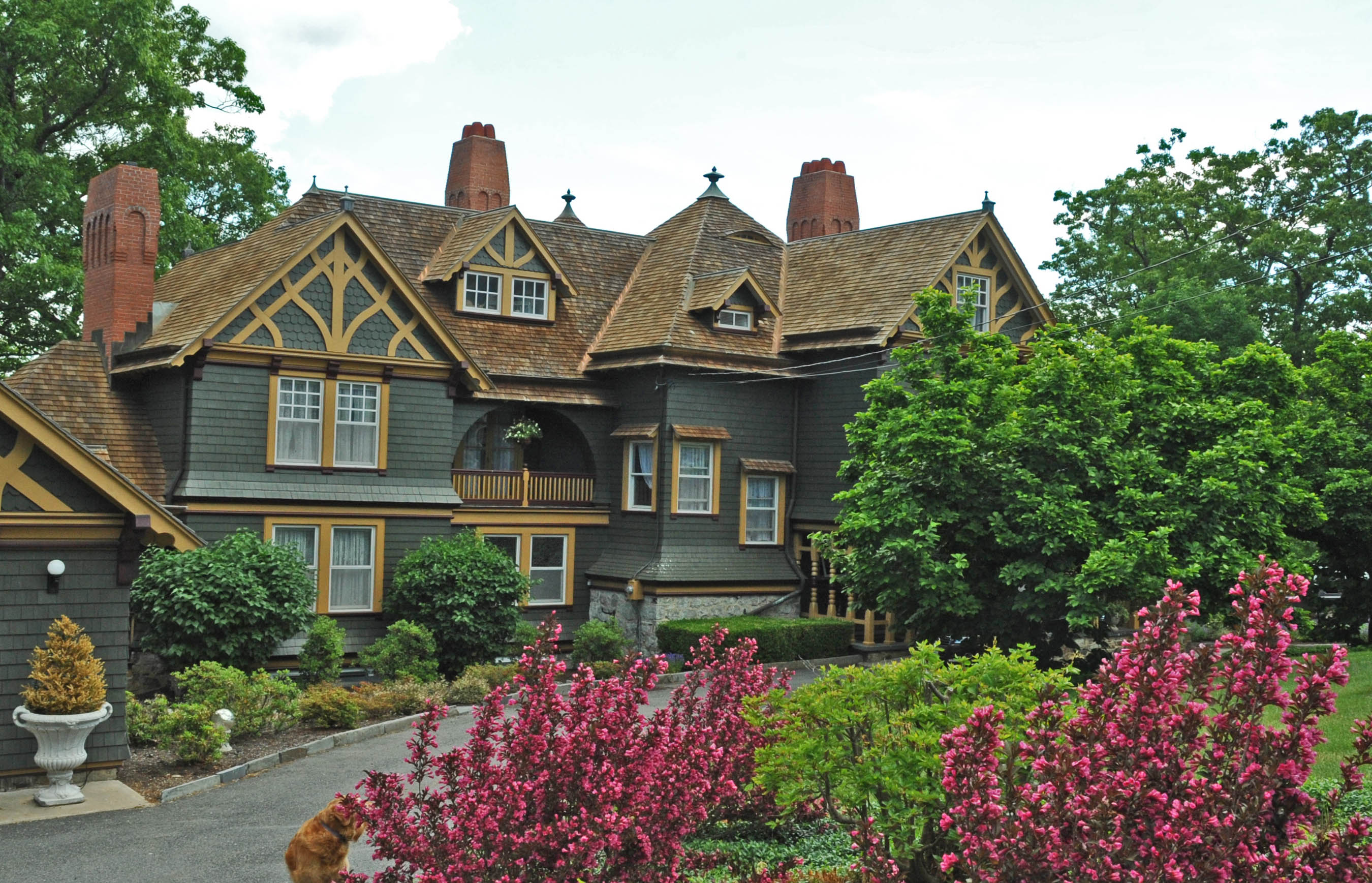
"Attol Tryst," in 2007

Lotta Crabtree Cottage (1885-86) is a Shingle style house in the Breslin Park neighborhood of Mount Arlington, New Jersey. Designed by the noted Philadelphia architect Frank Furness, the lakeside cottage is a contributing property in Mount Arlington Historic District.

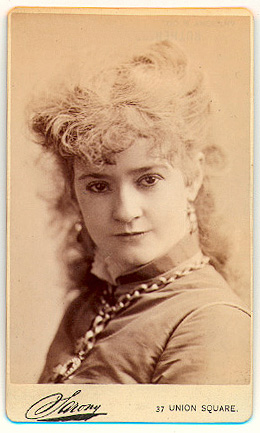
Lotta Crabtree

Lotta Crabtree (1847–1924) was an American actress and comedian, best known for her Western roles. The 18-room cottage sits on land that slopes down to Van Every Cove. It is 2-1/2 stories on the land side and 3-1/2 on the lake side. The exterior features Furness's "upside-down" chimneys, with corbels that flare outward near the top. An expansive porch/piazza, including a semi-circular section that traces the curve of the parlor, wraps around three sides of the house. The interior features Aesthetic Movement details characteristic of Furness, including a fireplace flanked by terra cotta dog-faced beasts. The billiard room's massive stone fireplace once featured a mosaic that spelled out "18 - LOTTA - 86" in gemstones.

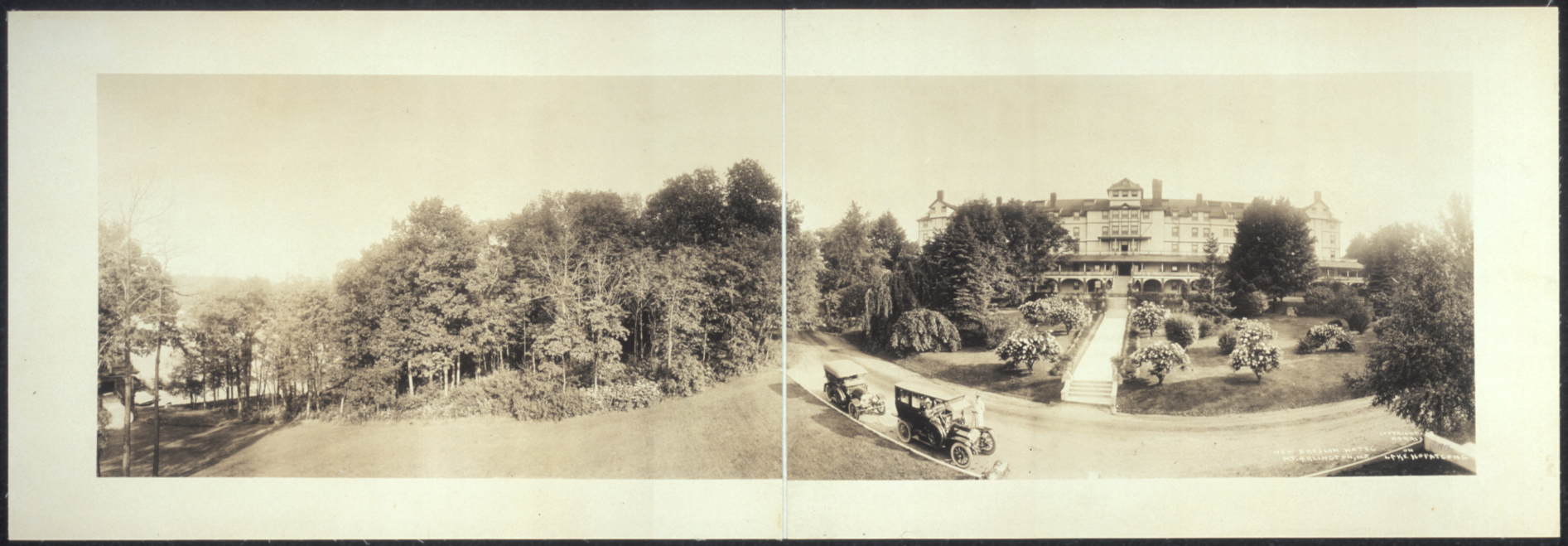
Breslin Hotel in 1913

Furness designed the nearby Breslin Hotel (1886, burned 1948) – a 175-room resort hotel built on a hill overlooking Lake Hopatcong. He also designed a number of summer cottages surrounding it. A popular celebrity in 1886, Crabtree "was given this house as part of promotion for the Breslin Hotel." She named it "Attol Tryst" ("Lotta" spelled backward), and summered there for 20 years.
