= The Carnival (film) =

- Directed by: Sidney Olcott
- Starring: Gene Gauntier; Jack J. Clark
- Cinematography: George K. Hollister
- Distributed by: Kalem Company
- Release date: May 12, 1911
- Running time: 1005 ft
- Country: United States
- Language: Silent (English intertitles)

The Carnival is a one-reel 1911 American motion picture produced by Kalem Company and directed by Sidney Olcott with Gene Gauntier and Jack J. Clark in the leading role.

== Cast ==
- Jack J. Clark - Jerome
- Gene Gauntier - His wife
