= The Vagabonds (1912 film) =

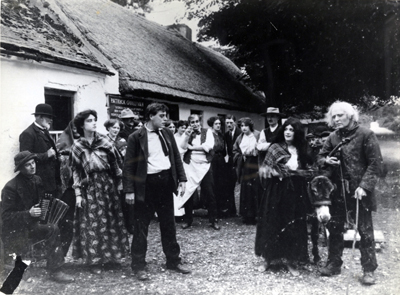
- From left to right: Alice Hollister, Sidney Olcott, Gene Gauntier and Jack J. Clark.
- Directed by: Sidney Olcott
- Written by: Gene Gauntier
- Produced by: Kalem Company
- Starring: Jack J. Clark; Gene Gauntier
- Cinematography: George K. Hollister
- Distributed by: General Films
- Release dates: February 9, 1912 (United States); March 28, 1912 (United Kingdom)
- Running time: 985 ft
- Country: United States
- Languages: Silent film (English intertitles)

The Vagabonds is a 1912 American silent film produced by Kalem Company. It was directed by Sidney Olcott with himself, Gene Gauntier and Jack J. Clark in the leading roles.

== Cast ==
- Gene Gauntier as Nell
- Sidney Olcott as Tom
- Jack J. Clark as The Violinist
- Alice Hollister as Jane

== Production notes ==
The film was shot in Beaufort, County Kerry, and Ireland, during summer of 1911.
