= The Conspiracy of Pontiac =

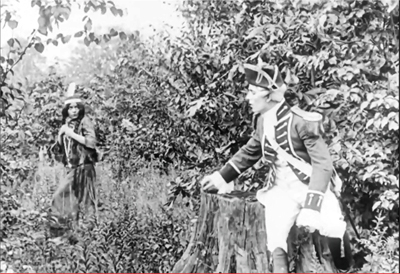
- Gene Gauntier and Jack J. Clark
- Directed by: Sidney Olcott
- Based on: The Conspiracy of Pontiac (1851) by Francis Parkman
- Produced by: Sidney Olcott
- Starring: Gene Gauntier; Jack J. Clark; Robert Vignola; Arthur Donaldson
- Cinematography: George K. Hollister
- Production company: Kalem Company
- Distributed by: General Film Company
- Release date: September 23, 1910
- Running time: 975 ft
- Country: United States
- Languages: Silent film (English intertitles)

The Conspiracy of Pontiac is an American silent film produced by Kalem Company and directed by Sidney Olcott with Gene Gauntier, Robert Vignola and Jack J. Clark in the leading roles. It is a story of the Indian war after the conquest of Canada.

A copy is kept in the Desmet collection at Eye Film Institute (Amsterdam).

== Cast ==
- Gene Gauntier as Indian Girl
- Robert G. Vignola
- Jack J. Clark as Major Gladwynn
- Arthur Donaldson as Indian chief
