= In the Clutches of the Ku Klux Klan =

- Directed by: Sidney Olcott
- Written by: Alf Hollingsworth
- Produced by: Gene Gauntier Feature Players
- Starring: Gene Gauntier; Jack J. Clark
- Distributed by: Warner's Features
- Release date: October 1913
- Running time: 3000 ft
- Country: United States
- Languages: Silent film (English intertitles)

In the Clutches of the Ku Klux Klan is a 1913 American silent film produced by Gene Gauntier Feature Players and distributed by Warner's Features. It was directed by Sidney Olcott with himself, Gene Gauntier and Jack J. Clark in the leading roles.

== Cast ==
- Gene Gauntier
- Jack J. Clark
- Alf Hollingsworth

== Production notes ==
- The film was shot in Jacksonville, Florida.
