= The Ancient Port of Jaffa =

1912 film by Sidney Olcott

- Directed by: Sidney Olcott
- Produced by: Kalem Company
- Cinematography: George K. Hollister
- Distributed by: General Film Company
- Release date: September 11, 1912
- Country: United States
- Languages: Silent film (English intertitles)

The Ancient Port of Jaffa is a 1912 American silent documentary produced by Kalem Company and distributed by General Film Company. It was directed by Sidney Olcott.

== Plot summary ==
The picture opens with a scene of a steamship, showing the Kalem players ready to depart for the ancient port of Jaffa, referred to in the Bible as Joppa. A successful landing is made after navigating the dangerous, rocky passage. A splendid view of Jaffa from the sea greets our eyes and. going ashore, we marvel at the wonderful street scene near the Custom House. We journey on to the auction market and then visit the public fountain on the Jaffa road.

== Cast ==
- J.J. Clark
- Gene Gauntier
- George K. Hollister
- Sidney Olcott
- J.A. Farnham
- Alice Hollister
- J.P. McGowan
- Robert G. Vignola

== Production notes ==
The documentary was shot in Jaffa, Palestine.
