= When the Dead Return =

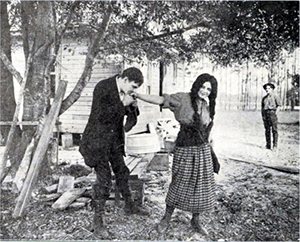
- JP McGowan, Gene Gauntier and Jack J. Clark (in the background)
- Directed by: Sidney Olcott
- Starring: Gene Gauntier; Jack J. Clark; JP McGowan
- Cinematography: George K. Hollister
- Distributed by: Kalem Company
- Release date: May 5, 1911
- Country: United States
- Language: Silent (English intertitles)

When the Dead Return is a one-reel 1911 American motion picture produced by Kalem Company and directed by Sidney Olcott with Gene Gauntier, Jack J. Clark and JP McGowan in the leading roles, and with Cinematography by George K. Hollister.

== Cast ==
- Jack J. Clark as Antoine
- Gene Gauntier as Marcele
- JP McGowan as Jacques
