= A Prisoner of the Harem =

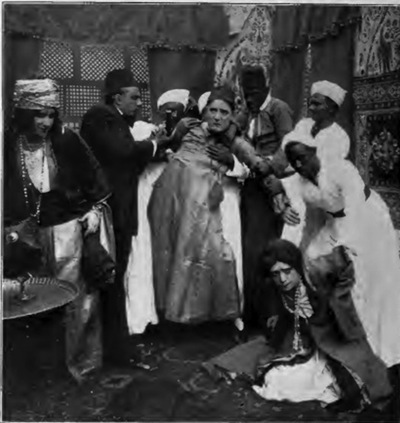
- Gene Gauntier (kneeling) and Jack J. Clark (center)
- Directed by: Sidney Olcott
- Written by: E. Alexander Powell
- Produced by: Kalem Company
- Starring: Jack J. Clark; Gene Gauntier
- Cinematography: George K. Hollister
- Distributed by: General Film Company
- Release date: July 19, 1912
- Running time: 1000 ft
- Country: United States
- Languages: Silent film (English intertitles)

A Prisoner of the Harem is a 1912 American silent film produced by Kalem Company and distributed by General Film Company. It was directed by Sidney Olcott with himself, Gene Gauntier and Jack J. Clark in the leading roles.

== Cast ==
- Gene Gauntier - Alice Durand
- Jack J. Clark - The tourist
- Robert Vignola - The Pacha
- Alice Hollister - Zorah

== Production notes ==
The film was shot in Luxor, Egypt.
