= In Blossom Time =

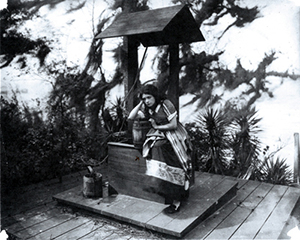
- Gene Gauntier
- Directed by: Sidney Olcott
- Produced by: Sidney Olcott
- Starring: Gene Gauntier; Jack J. Clark
- Cinematography: George K. Hollister
- Production company: Kalem Company
- Distributed by: General Film Company
- Release date: May 19, 1911
- Running time: 1000 ft
- Country: United States
- Languages: Silent film (English intertitles)

In Blossom Time is an American silent film produced in 1934 by Kalem Company and directed by Sidney Olcott with Gene Gauntier and Jack J. Clark in the leading roles.

== Cast ==
- Gene Gauntier - Angelica
- Jack J. Clark - Victorian, son of Don Pedro
- J.P. McGowan - Don Pedro

== Production notes ==
The film was shot in Jacksonville, Florida.
