= A War Time Escape =

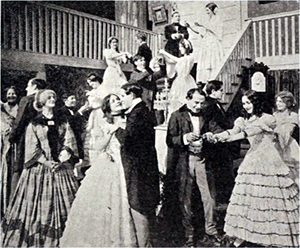
- Gene Gauntier and Jack J. Clark (embracing), Robert Vignola (right)
- Directed by: Sidney Olcott
- Produced by: Sidney Olcott
- Starring: Gene Gauntier; Jack J. Clark; Robert Vignola
- Cinematography: George K. Hollister
- Production company: Kalem Company
- Distributed by: General Film Company
- Release date: March 17, 1911
- Running time: 980 ft
- Country: United States
- Languages: Silent film (English intertitles)

A War Time Escape is an American silent film produced by Kalem Company and directed by Sidney Olcott with Gene Gauntier, Jack J. Clark and Robert Vignola in the leading roles.

== Cast ==
- Gene Gauntier
- Jack J. Clark
- Robert Vignola

== Production notes ==
The film was shot in Jacksonville, Florida.
