= Grandmother's War Story =

1910 American silent film

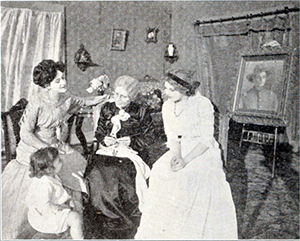
- Gene Gautier (center) as the grandmother
- Directed by: Sidney Olcott
- Produced by: Sidney Olcott
- Starring: Gene Gauntier; Jack J. Clark
- Cinematography: George K. Hollister
- Production company: Kalem Company
- Distributed by: General Film Company
- Release date: February 15, 1910
- Running time: 995 ft
- Country: United States
- Languages: Silent film (English intertitles)

Grandmother's War Story is an American silent film produced by Kalem Company and directed by Sidney Olcott with Gene Gauntier and Jack J. Clark.

== Cast ==
- Gene Gauntier
- Jack J. Clark

== Production notes ==
The film was shot in Jacksonville, Florida.
