= By a Woman's Wit =

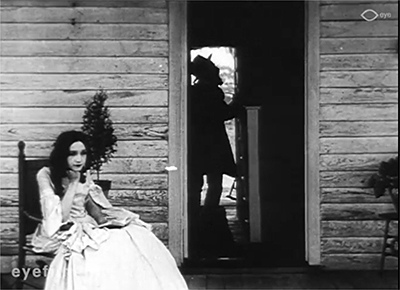
- Gene Gauntier
- Directed by: Sidney Olcott
- Produced by: Sidney Olcott
- Starring: Jack J. Clark; Alice Hollister; Robert Vignola
- Cinematography: George K. Hollister
- Production company: Kalem Company
- Distributed by: General Film Company
- Release date: April 5, 1911
- Running time: 1000 ft
- Country: United States
- Languages: Silent film (English intertitles)

By a Woman's Wit is a 1911 American silent film produced by Kalem Company. It was directed by Sidney Olcott with Jack J. Clark and Alice Hollister in the leading roles. A copy is kept in the Desmet collection at Eye Film Institute (Amsterdam).

== Cast ==
- Jack J. Clark as Lieutenant Jaspers
- Robert Vignola
- Alice Hollister as Pamela

== Production notes ==
The film was shot in Jacksonville, Florida.
