= You Remember Ellen =

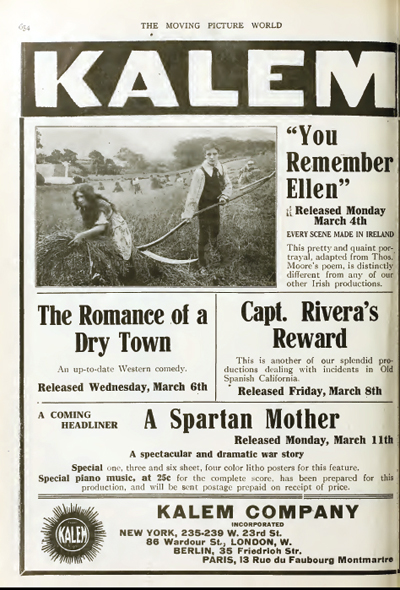
- Advertising published in The Moving Picture World, Vol 11, p 654
- Directed by: Sidney Olcott
- Written by: Gene Gauntier
- Based on: poem You Remember Ellen by Thomas Moore
- Produced by: Kalem Company
- Starring: Jack J. Clark; Gene Gauntier
- Cinematography: George K. Hollister
- Distributed by: General Film Company
- Release date: March 4, 1912
- Running time: 1028 ft
- Country: United States
- Languages: Silent film (English intertitles)

You Remember Ellen is a 1912 American silent film produced by Kalem Company and distributed by General Films. It was directed by Sidney Olcott with Gene Gauntier and Jack J. Clark in the leading roles. It was one of more than a dozen films produced by the Kalem Company filmed in Ireland for American audiences.

== Plot ==
The film is based on the poem You Remember Ellen by Thomas Moore, of which selected verses appear as intertitles in the film. Ellen is a young countrywoman who marries a traveling peasant named William. The couple leaves Ellen's home to seek their fortune elsewhere. Eventually they come upon a mansion, where William reveals that he is an aristocrat in disguise and they are Lord and Lady of Rosna Hall.

== Cast ==
- Gene Gauntier as Ellen
- Jack J. Clark as William
- Anna Clark as Ellen's Mother
- Alice Hollister as Jane
- Arthur Donaldson
- Robert Vignola
- J. P. McGowan

== Production notes ==
The film was shot in Beaufort, County Kerry, Ireland, during summer of 1911.
