= The Poacher's Pardon =

- Directed by: Sidney Olcott
- Produced by: Kalem Company
- Starring: Jack J. Clark; Alice Hollister; J.P. McGowan
- Cinematography: George K. Hollister
- Distributed by: General Film Company
- Release date: September 30, 1912
- Running time: 1000 ft
- Country: United States
- Languages: Silent film (English intertitles)

The Poacher's Pardon is a 1912 American silent film produced by Kalem Company and distributed by General Film Company. It was directed by Sidney Olcott with Alice Hollister, Jack J. Clark and J.P. McGowan in the leading roles.

== Cast ==
- Jack J. Clark - Jim Warren
- Alice Hollister - Dora Wallace
- J.P. McGowan - Wallace
- Helen Lindroth

== Production notes ==
The film was shot in England.
