= The Scimitar of the Prophet =

1913 film

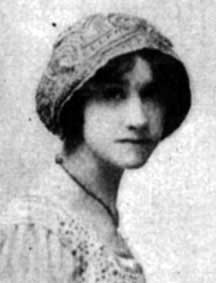
The film starred Alice Hollister

The Scimitar of the Prophet is a 1913 American short silent film drama directed by Robert G. Vignola. The film starred Earle Foxe, and Alice Hollister.

== Plot ==
While touring Egypt, Harris and his wife visit an ancient temple where a sacred scimitar is kept under the watch of Hadjji, a Muslim priest. Harris's wife becomes fascinated by the weapon and insists that he take it, despite his warnings that, according to their guidebook, the scimitar was given to the Prophet in a vision and that anyone who disturbs it will incur the vengeance of Allah. Reluctantly, Harris agrees and returns to the temple that night, using a rope ladder to steal the scimitar. During his escape, he loses his hat, which is found by Hadjji. Hadjji follows the couple to the United States. Disguised as a rug merchant, he gains entry to their home, where he carries out the promised vengeance of Allah.

== Cast ==
- Earle Foxe as Harris - a Tourist
- Alice Hollister as Doris Harris, his wife
- Robert G. Vignola as Hadjji, a Mohammedan Priest
- Henry Hallam
