= For the Love of an Enemy =

For Love of an Enemy
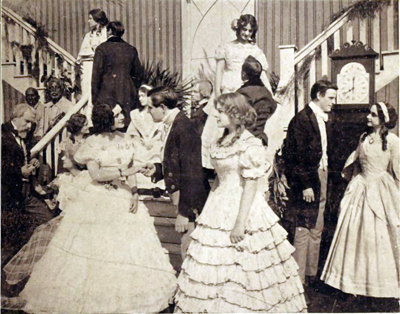
- Gene Gauntier (left), Jack J. Clark (center), JP McGowan (right)
- Directed by: Sidney Olcott
- Starring: Gene Gauntier; Jack J. Clark; JP McGowan
- Cinematography: George K. Hollister
- Distributed by: Kalem Company
- Release date: January 11, 1911
- Country: United States
- Language: Silent (English intertitles)

For Love of an Enemy is a one-reel 1911 American motion picture produced by Kalem Company and directed by Sidney Olcott. A war story detailing the adventures and the love affair of a Union spy in the Confederate lines.

== Cast ==
- Jack J. Clark - Confederate Spy
- Gene Gauntier - Hallie Coburn
- JP McGowan -

== Production notes ==
The film was shot at Jacksonville Fla.

A copy is kept in the Desmet collection at Eye Film Institute (Amsterdam)

== Bibliography ==
- The Bioscope, 1911, February.
- The Film Index, Vol VII, n°1, p 1; p 21; p 24.
- The Moving Picture World, Vol 8, p 97; p 144.
- The New York Dramatic Mirror, 1911, January 18, p 30.
