= The Little Sister (1911 film) =

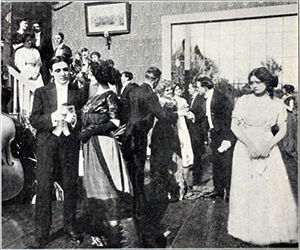
- Jack Clark (left), Robert Vignola in the background (center) and Gene Gauntier (right).
- Directed by: Sidney Olcott
- Produced by: Sidney Olcott
- Starring: Gene Gauntier; Jack J. Clark; Robert Vignola
- Cinematography: George K. Hollister
- Production company: Kalem Company
- Distributed by: General Film Company
- Release date: February 9, 1911
- Running time: 1000 ft
- Country: United States
- Languages: Silent film (English intertitles)

The Little Sister is an American silent film produced by Kalem Company and directed by Sidney Olcott with Gene Gauntier, Robert Vignola and Jack J. Clark.

== Plot ==
The story is laid in the Southland and centers around a beautiful estate where live two typical daughters of the South. The younger girl is a regular tomboy, devoted to her horse and to outdoor sports. The older is of a different type, in fact, has long since reached the marriageable age and is looking for a husband at every turn. The hero arrives in a young chap from the North who is touring the South on a motor cycle and meets with an accident and is taken to the home of the two sisters. There he convalesces from his injury and of course there is ample opportunity for him to become acquainted with the two girls. The older marks him for her particular prize, but he naturally prefers the young one. When his visit ends there is a great deal of hard feeling, but the younger girls makes up her mind that her older sister has won out.

A year passes and the young chap is invited back again to attend a house party. A big dance is given in his honor. While the ball is in progress he looks about for the younger sister, who had not been allowed to attend as she is so badly tanned, her big sister pronounces her a fright. Little sister determines to watch the guests from the veranda, where the young man finds her. This offers an opportunity for a proper climax of the story. There is a tender lover scene and when it is over the younger sister finds that although cast off from the party, she was won the great prize after all.

— The Moving Picture World

== Cast ==
- Gene Gauntier
- Robert Vignola
- Jack J. Clark

== Production notes ==
The film was shot in Jacksonville, Florida.

== Reception ==
The Film Index wrote that it was a pleasing comedy drama and throughout this picture will be found a number of most delightful scenes, beautiful in composition and photography. Especially pretty is the ballroom scene. As the little sister, Miss Gene Gauntier is delicious, appearing to better advantage, possibly than has been her good fortune to appear in many of the pictures which she has been featured.
