= Tangled Lives (1910 film) =

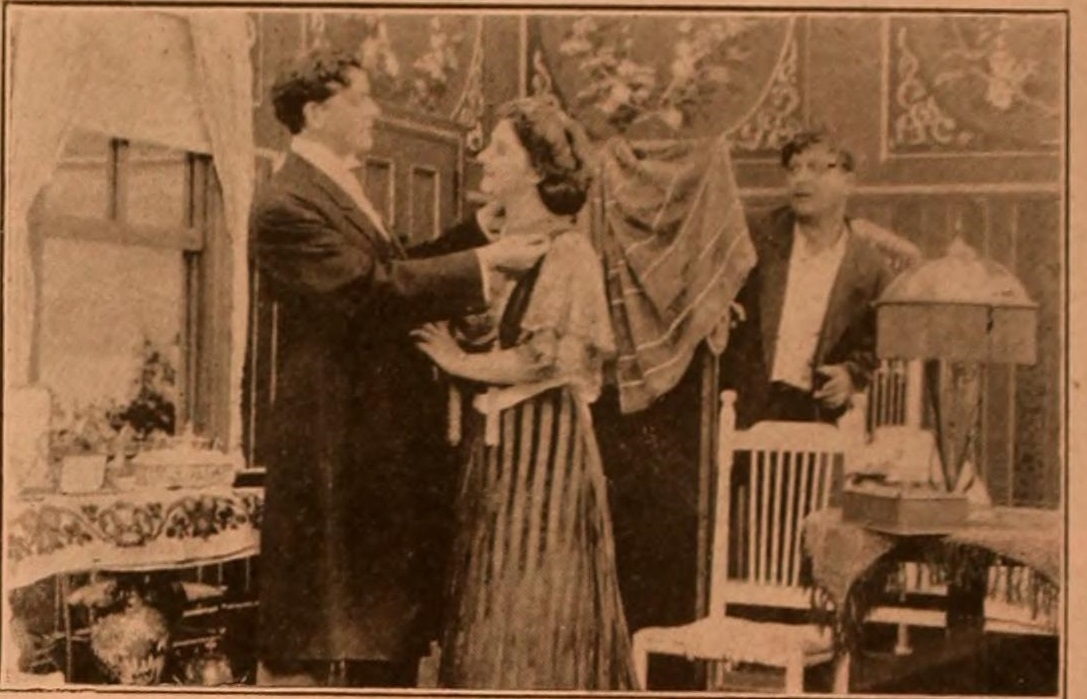
- A surviving film still
- Produced by: Thanhouser Company
- Distributed by: Motion Picture Distributing and Sales Company
- Release date: September 13, 1910
- Country: United States
- Languages: Silent; English intertitles

Tangled Lives is a 1910 American silent drama short film produced by the Thanhouser Company. The plot focuses on, John Hill, a bank cashier who decides to fakes his death after the manager finds his accounts are short. Before he can go through with the plan, a reporter interviews the wife, May, and decides to suppress the story because he has become infatuated with her. Five years pass, May and the reporter decide to marry, but John returns on the day of the wedding. Upon sneaking into the house, he sees their love and decides to disappear. As he attempts to leave he accidentally falls to his death and the reporter removes his body before he leads May to the altar. The film was described as a variant of Enoch Arden by one reviewer, but it differs in its execution. The cast and credits of the film are unknown, but a surviving film still shows the principal characters. The film was released on September 13, 1910, to positive reviews. The film was presumed lost, but a surviving copy was identified in the collection of the Gosfilmofond of Russia in 2026.

== Plot ==
Though the film is presumed lost, a synopsis survives in The Bioscope from December 22, 1910. It states: "A shortage is discovered in the accounts of John Hill, a young bank cashier. The manager of the bank agrees to give him three days' time in which to make good the shortage. John confides in his young wife, May, and a young reporter interviews May about her husband's shortage. He becomes interested in the plucky young woman, and decides to suppress the story. The husband fails to raise the money, and leaves his clothes, with a note telling of his intended suicide, on a wharf at the water's edge. After five years the young reporter wins May for his bride. On the day of their wedding, John is attracted to the house where the ceremony is to take place. Hearing of the many rich gifts which the bride has received, he enters the house, and witnesses a love scene between the young reporter and his (John's) wife. (Note: This is not a sex scene, but more of embracing and affirming that the two will soon be married. This decision is the core of the Enoch Arden reference because John Hill decides to leave instead of letting her know he is alive.) He finds it impossible to escape by the way he entered, and attempts to leave by the floor window, falls to the ground and is killed. Here Hastings finds him, and has the body carried away, and leads May to the altar."

== Production ==
The writer of the scenario is unknown, but it was most likely Lloyd Lonergan. He was an experienced newspaperman employed by The New York Evening World while writing scripts for the Thanhouser productions. The plot was likened by Walton of The Moving Picture News to Enoch Arden, but the story differs in several ways. Published by Alfred, Lord Tennyson in 1864, the poem tells of the eponymous character who becomes shipwrecked on a desert island and returns home a decade later to find his wife has remarried and they have a new child. For the sake of his wife's happiness, he never lets her know that he is alive. The plot differs because the husband willingly fakes his death and returns on the day of the wedding. Rather than announce himself, he attempts to leave and dies in the process, his body is removed by the prospective husband before marrying her. The similarity with the poem comes from refusing to confront or interrupt the wedding by revealing the fact that he is alive is ensured by John's true death at the climax. The New York Dramatic Mirror noted that the journalists arrived to photograph and cover the apparent suicide too quickly, making it illogical that the fake suicide would not have been revealed.

The film director is unknown, but it may have been Barry O'Neil. Film historian Q. David Bowers does not attribute a cameraman for this production, but at least two possible candidates exist. Blair Smith was the first cameraman of the Thanhouser company, but he was soon joined by Carl Louis Gregory who had years of experience as a still and motion picture photographer. The role of the cameraman was uncredited in 1910 productions. Cast credits are unknown, but many 1910 Thanhouser productions are fragmentary. A surviving film still gives the possibility of identifying the three leading actors.

== Release and reception ==
The single reel drama, approximately 1000 feet long, was released on September 13, 1910. The film had a wide release, with theater advertisements known in Kansas, Maryland, Pennsylvania, and Indiana. Some later advertisements for the film may have been referring to the Kalem Company's Tangled Lives released in May 1911. The Kalem film is extant. Rare typographical errors also resulted in the Reliance Film Company having a film of this name in some advertisements, but this is an error on Tangled Lines. The film was released in Britain on December 22, 1910.

Reviews for the film were mostly positive, with Walton of The Moving Picture News stating, "[It is another] variant of Enoch Arden, with a newspaperman interjected. The resurrected undesirable husband is cleverly eliminated. The coincidences are too miraculous to suit a plain newspaperman." The New York Dramatic Mirror agreed in premise that the plot of the film had been done before, but stated, "...the Thanhouser people have done it fairly well and added a few details which, while not quite logical, give it some new interest." The Moving Picture World offered a neutral summary of the plot, but concluded that the film "is a graphic illustration of conditions which might arise almost any time, and develops an interestingly dramatic story as it proceeds." One local review of the film called it "splendid", but either by typographical error or for reasons unknown, gives a different story of the plot and even stating that the wife fell to her death by accident when attempting to see her.

== See also ==
- List of American films of 1910
