= The Railroad Raiders of '62 =

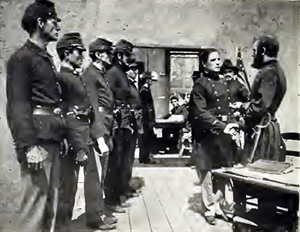
- Directed by: Sidney Olcott
- Produced by: Sidney Olcott
- Starring: Jack J. Clark; Robert Vignola; JP McGowan
- Cinematography: George K. Hollister
- Production company: Kalem Company
- Distributed by: General Film Company
- Release date: May 26, 1911
- Running time: 1000 ft
- Country: United States
- Languages: Silent film (English intertitles)

The Railroad Raiders of '62 is an American silent film produced by Kalem Company and directed by Sidney Olcott with Jack J. Clark, Robert Vignola and JP McGowan in the leading roles. The action takes place during the U.S. civil war.

== Cast ==
- Jack J. Clark -
- Robert Vignola -
- JP McGowan -

== Production notes ==
- The film was shot in Jacksonville, Florida.
- In 1915, JP McGowan made a remake of The Railroad Raiders of '62 in The Hazards of Helen series #19, with Helen Holmes.
- Buster Keaton was inspired by the story of The Railroad Raiders of '62, the raid of James J. Andrews, to shoot The General in 1926.
- This is only one of three films depicting Andrews' Raid. The other two films were The General (1926), and The Great Locomotive Chase (1956).
