= The Little Rebel =

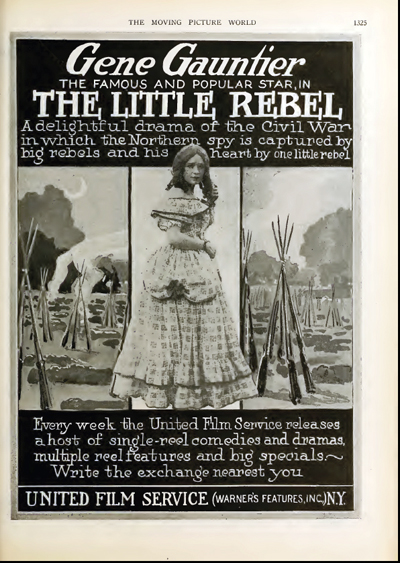
- Advertising published by The Moving Picture World, Vol 22, p 1325.
- Directed by: Sidney Olcott
- Produced by: Gene Gauntier Feature Players
- Starring: Gene Gauntier; Jack J. Clark
- Distributed by: United Film Service (Warner's Features)
- Release date: December 1914
- Running time: 3 reels
- Country: United States
- Languages: Silent; English intertitles

The Little Rebel is a 1914 American silent film produced by Gene Gauntier Feature Players and distributed by United Film Services (Warner's Features). It was directed by Sidney Olcott with Gene Gauntier and Jack J. Clark in the leading roles.

== Cast ==
- Gene Gauntier - The Southern Girl
- Jack J. Clark - The Northern soldier
- Arthur Donaldson - The Southern Colonel
