= The Lass Who Couldn't Forget =

- Directed by: Sidney Olcott
- Produced by: Sidney Olcott
- Starring: Gene Gauntier; Jack J. Clark
- Cinematography: George K. Hollister
- Production company: Kalem Company
- Distributed by: General Film Company
- Release date: March 29, 1911
- Running time: 995 ft
- Country: United States
- Languages: Silent film (English intertitles)

The Lass Who Couldn't Forget is an American silent film produced by Kalem Company and directed by Sidney Olcott with Gene Gauntier and Jack J. Clark in the leading roles.

== Cast ==
- Gene Gauntier – Meg
- Jack J. Clark – Alix

== Production notes ==
The film was shot in Jacksonville, Florida.
