= Losing to Win =

- Directed by: Sidney Olcott
- Written by: Gene Gauntier
- Produced by: Kalem Company
- Starring: Gene Gauntier; Jack J. Clark
- Cinematography: George Hollister
- Release date: September 20, 1911
- Running time: 1000 ft
- Country: United States
- Languages: Silent film (English intertitles)

Losing to Win is a 1911 American silent film produced by Kalem Company. It was directed by Sidney Olcott with Gene Gauntier and Jack J. Clark in the leading roles.

== Cast ==
- Gene Gauntier - Diana Grant
- Jack J. Clark - Jack Carlyle

== Production notes ==
The film was shot on board RMS Baltic and in New York and Ireland during summer 1911.
