= Sailor Jack's Reformation =

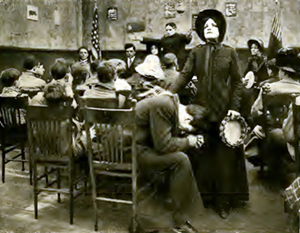
- Jack J. Clark and Gene Gauntier
- Directed by: Sidney Olcott
- Produced by: Sidney Olcott
- Starring: Gene Gauntier; Jack J. Clark; JP McGowan
- Cinematography: George K. Hollister
- Production company: Kalem Company
- Distributed by: General Film Company
- Release date: February 22, 1911
- Running time: 995 ft
- Country: United States
- Languages: Silent film (English intertitles)

Sailor Jack's Reformation is an American silent film produced by Kalem Company and directed by Sidney Olcott with Gene Gauntier, Jack J. Clark and JP McGowan in the leading role.

== Cast ==
- Gene Gauntier - Captain Agnes
- Jack J. Clark - Lieutenant Landers
- JP McGowan - Sailor Jack
