= The Shaughraun (film) =

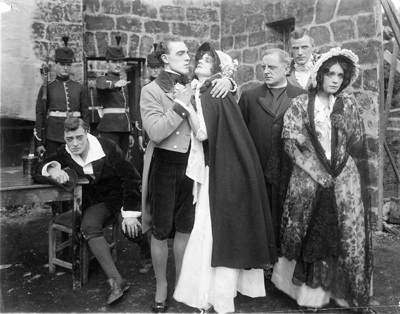
- from left to right: Sidney Olcott, George Melville, Alice Hollister, Arthur Lester, J.P. McGowan and Gene Gauntier.
- Directed by: Sidney Olcott
- Written by: Gene Gauntier
- Based on: play The Shaughraun by Dion Boucicault
- Produced by: Kalem Company
- Starring: Gene Gauntier; Jack J. Clark; Sidney Olcott
- Cinematography: George K. Hollister
- Distributed by: General Film Company
- Release date: December 23, 1912
- Running time: 3000 ft, 3 reels
- Country: United States
- Languages: Silent film (English intertitles)

The Shaughraun is a 1912 American silent film produced by the Kalem Company and distributed by the General Film Company. It was directed by Sidney Olcott with himself, Gene Gauntier, Alice Hollister and Jack J. Clark in the leading roles.

== Plot ==
The main character Robert Ffolliott, a young Irish man, is sent unjustly to a penal colony in Australian for false accusations made by Kinchella. There, he is helped by Conn, the Shaughraungo, who helps Robert to escape the prison ship back to Ireland, where he reunites with his love.

== Cast ==
- Sidney Olcott as Con, The Shaughraun
- Gene Gauntier as Claire Ffolliott
- Alice Hollister as Moya
- Jack J. Clark as Captain Molyneux
- George Melville as Robert Ffolliott
- J.P. McGowan as Cory Kinchella
- Robert Vignola as Hervey Duff
- Arthur Lester as Father Dolan
- Mrs Brokaw as Mrs O'Kelly, Con's mother
- Henrietta O'Beck

== Production notes ==
- The film was shot in Beaufort, County Kerry, Ireland, during the summer of 1912.
