= The O'Kalems Visit Killarney =

1912 American short silent documentary directed by Sidney Olcott

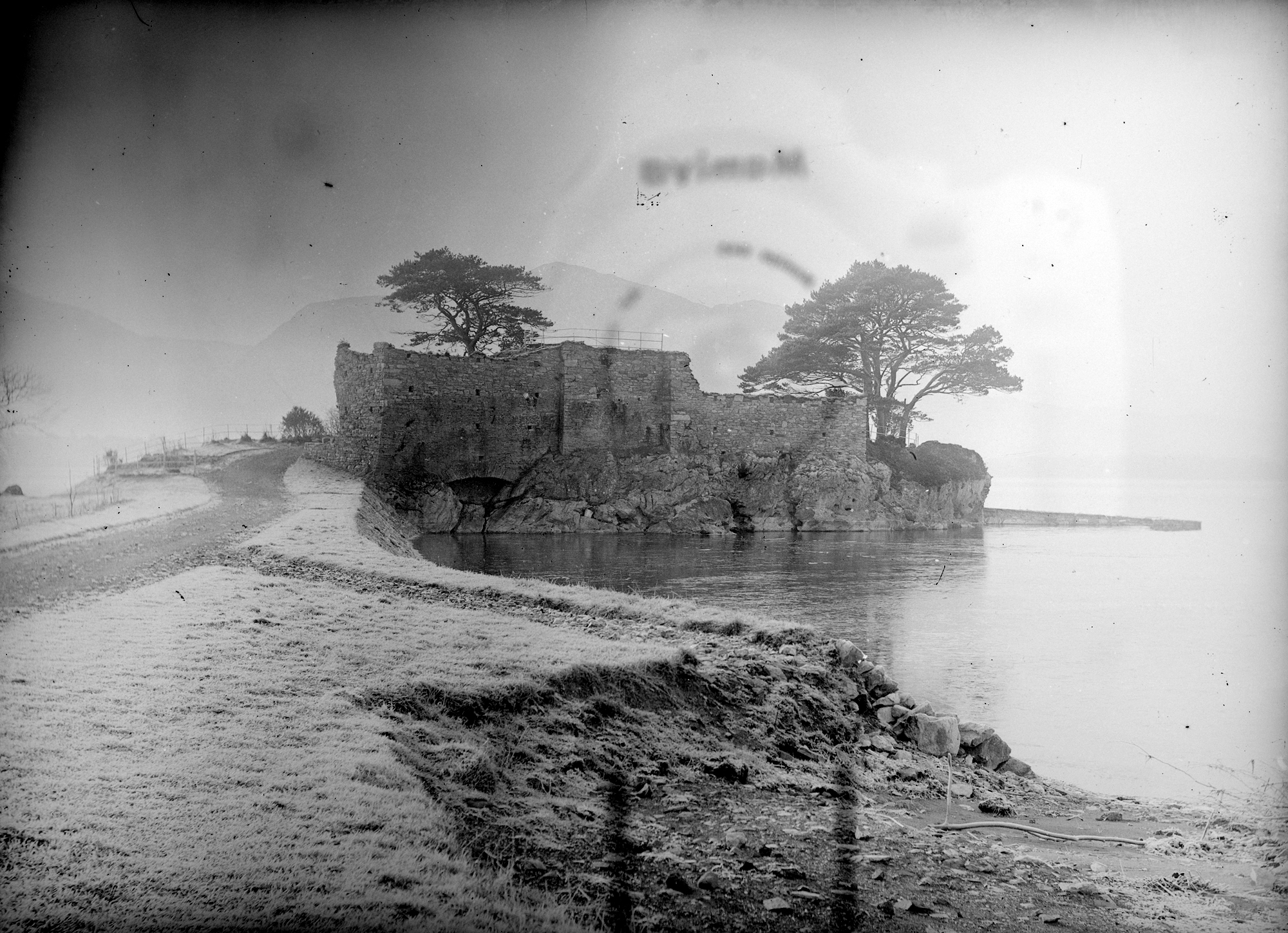
- Directed by: Sidney Olcott
- Produced by: Kalem Company
- Cinematography: George K. Hollister
- Release date: January 5, 1912
- Running time: 480 ft
- Country: United States
- Languages: Silent film (English intertitles)

The O'Kalems Visit Killarney is a 1912 American silent documentary produced by Kalem Company. It was directed by Sidney Olcott.

== Production notes ==
The film was shot in Killarney, County Kerry, Ireland, during summer of 1911.
