= The Love Romance of the Girl Spy =

- Directed by: Sidney Olcott
- Produced by: Sidney Olcott
- Production company: Kalem Company
- Distributed by: General Film Company
- Release date: April 29, 1910
- Running time: 970 ft
- Country: United States
- Languages: Silent film (English intertitles)

The Love Romance of the Girl Spy is an American silent film produced by Kalem Company and directed by Sidney Olcott. It is a story about the Civil War.

== Production notes ==
The film was shot in Jacksonville, Florida.
