= Fred Marsden =

American playwright

- Born: William A. Silver; 1842; Baltimore, Maryland, United States
- Died: May 19, 1888 (aged 45–46); Manhattan, New York City, New York, United States
- Cause of death: suicide
- Occupations: lawyer, playwright
- Known for: melodramas and farces
- Notable work: see Notable works
- Children: at least 1 daughter
- Father: Abraham Silver

Fred Marsden (1842 – May 19, 1888) was an American playwright.

== Life and career ==
Born William A. Silver in Baltimore, Maryland, Marsden was the son of Abraham Silver. He was educated as a lawyer in Philadelphia and began his career as a lawyer in that city prior to working as a playwright. He wrote his first play in 1872 at which time he changed his name to Fred Marsden.

== Notable works ==
He penned both melodramas and farces; usually writing for the specific talents of well known performers of the second half of the 19th century.

For Lotta Crabtree he wrote the plays Zip (1874), Musette (1876), and Bob (188?).

For the actress Annie Pixley he wrote Zara (1883) and Elly (1885).

For the Irish comedian Joseph Murphy he wrote Cheek (1883) and Humbug (1886), and for William J. Scanlan he wrote the farce The Irish Minstrel (1886).

== Death ==
Marsden committed suicide on May 19, 1888, at his home in Manhattan following a quarrel with his daughter.
