= Among the Irish Fisher Folk =

1911 film by Sidney Olcott

- Directed by: Sidney Olcott
- Produced by: Kalem Company
- Cinematography: George K. Hollister
- Release date: November 29, 1911
- Running time: 640 ft
- Country: United States
- Languages: Silent film (English intertitles)

Among the Irish Fisher Folk is a 1911 American silent documentary produced by Kalem Company. It was directed by Sidney Olcott

== Production notes ==
The film was shot in Ireland, in Howth, co Dublin and on board a fishing boat, during summer of 1911.
