= The Further Adventures of the Girl Spy =

- Directed by: Sidney Olcott
- Produced by: Sidney Olcott
- Starring: Gene Gauntier; Alice Hollister; Sidney Olcott; Robert Vignola
- Production company: Kalem Company
- Distributed by: General Film Company
- Release date: May 20, 1910
- Running time: 920 ft
- Country: United States
- Languages: Silent (English intertitles)

The Further Adventures of the Girl Spy is a 1910 American silent drama film produced by Kalem Company and directed by Sidney Olcott with Gene Gauntier in the leading role. A story of the Civil War.

== Cast ==
- Gene Gauntier – Nan
- Alice Hollister
- Sidney Olcott
- Robert G. Vignola
- Kenean Buel
- Thomas Santley

== Production notes ==
The film was shot in Jacksonville, Florida.

A copy is kept in the collection of the British Film Institute.
