= The Little Soldier of '64 =

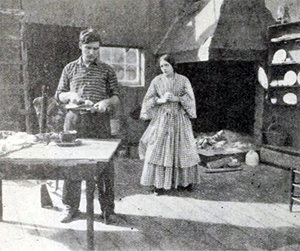
- Jack J. Clark and Gene Gauntier
- Directed by: Sidney Olcott
- Produced by: Sidney Olcott
- Starring: Gene Gauntier; Jack J. Clark
- Cinematography: George K. Hollister
- Production company: Kalem Company
- Distributed by: General Film Company
- Release date: June 30, 1911
- Running time: 940 ft
- Country: United States
- Languages: Silent film (English intertitles)

The Little Soldier of '64 is an American silent film produced by Kalem Company and directed by Sidney Olcott with Gene Gauntier and Jack J. Clark in the leading roles.

== Cast ==
- Gene Gauntier -
- Jack J. Clark -

== Production notes ==
The film was shot in Jacksonville, Florida.
