= Tangled Lives (1911 film) =

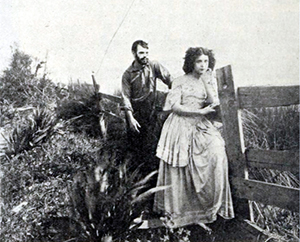
- Gene Gauntier
- Directed by: Sidney Olcott
- Starring: Gene Gauntier; Jack J. Clark; JP McGowan
- Cinematography: George K. Hollister
- Distributed by: Kalem Company
- Release date: May 26, 1911
- Running time: 1000 ft
- Country: United States
- Language: Silent (English intertitles)

Tangled Lives is a one-reel 1911 American motion picture produced by Kalem Company and directed by Sidney Olcott with Gene Gauntier, Jack J. Clark and JP McGowan in the leading roles. The action takes place during the Seminoles war, in Florida.

A copy is kept at the Library of Congress, Washington DC.

== Production notes ==
- The film was shot in Jacksonville, Florida.
- IMDb has listing for two Kalem films from 1911. Probably separate listings for the same film.

== Cast ==
- Jack J. Clark - James Ward
- Gene Gauntier - Liza Marsh
- JP McGowan -
- George Melford - James Ward (unconfirmed) *2nd IMDb listing
- Alice Joyce - Liza (unconfirmed) *2nd IMDb listing
