= Alice Hollister =

American actress (1886–1973)

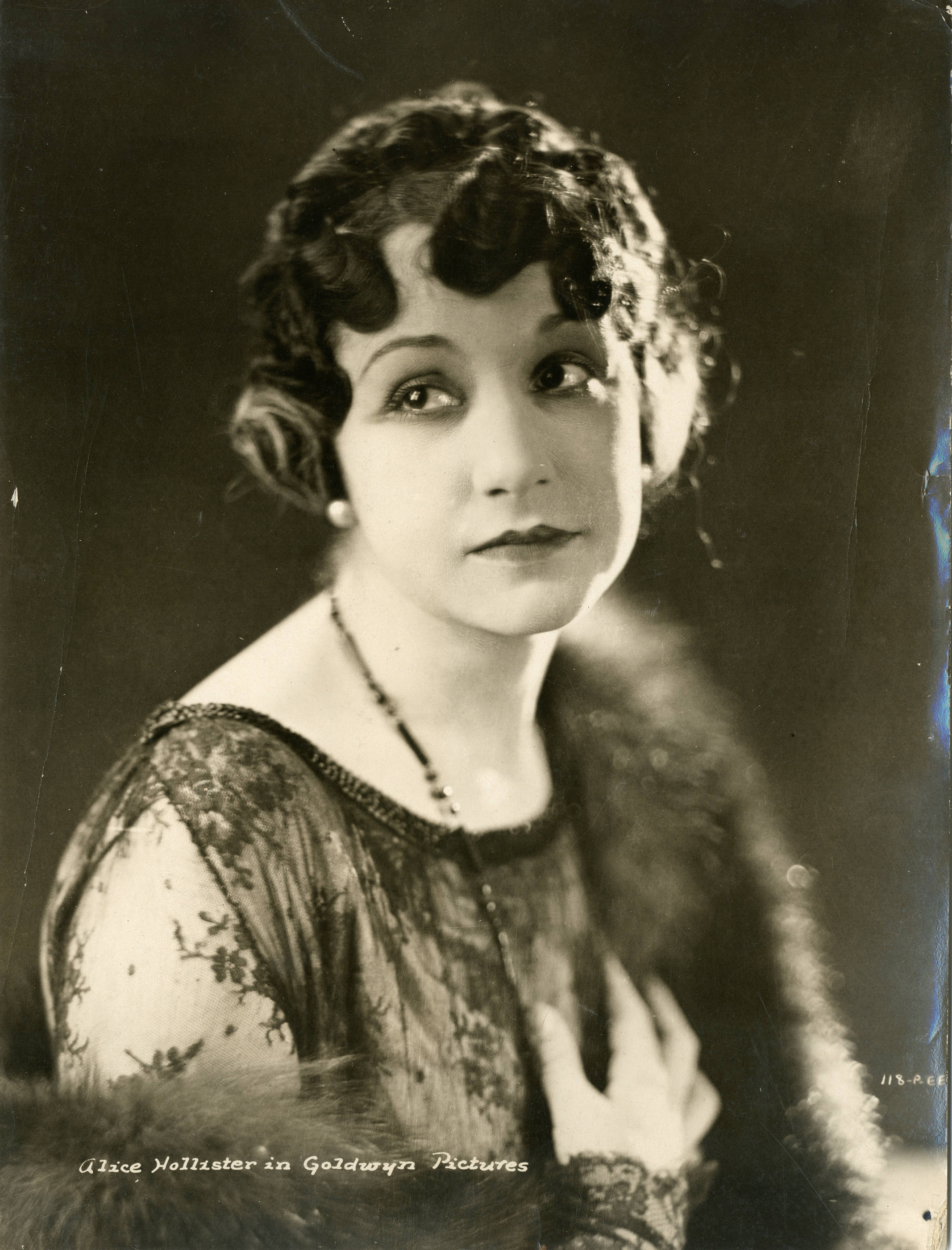
- Hollister in 1923
- Born: Rosalie Alice Amélie Berger; September 28, 1886; Worcester, Massachusetts, U.S.
- Died: February 24, 1973 (aged 86); Costa Mesa, California, U.S.
- Spouse: George K. Hollister (m. 1903; died 1952)
- Children: 2

Alice Hollister (born Rosalie Alice Amélie Berger, September 28, 1886 – February 24, 1973) was an American silent film actress who appeared in around 90 films between 1910 and 1925. She is known for her roles in movies such as From the Manger to the Cross and The Vampire.

== Biography ==
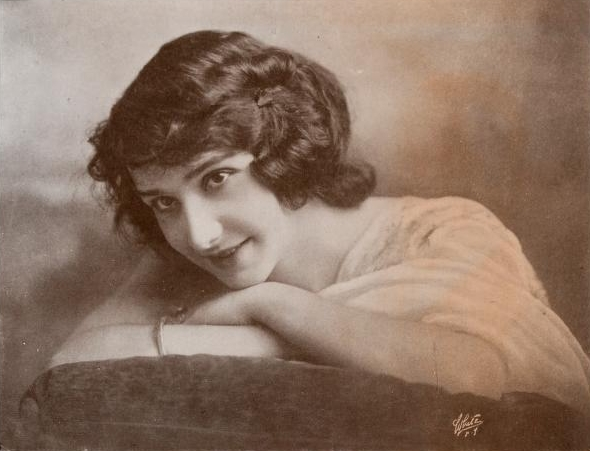
Hollister c.1914

Born in Worcester, Massachusetts, Hollister was the last of six siblings. Her parents Pierre Napoleon Berger, a grocery clerk, and Marie Alphonse Foisy were both of French-Canadian ancestry. Convent educated in the United States and Canada, in 1905 she began to work as an artist and lived with her brother Henry in Manhattan, along with his wife and three children.

On November of the same year, she married George K. Hollister who a few years later became a pioneer cinematographer with Kalem Studios in New York City. When Kalem Studios began sending a film crew to Florida in the wintertime, Alice Hollister accompanied her husband. She began appearing in film in 1910, at first because of the small crew and the frequent need for a female in a bit part. However, she liked acting and went on to appear in many films, the last in 1925.

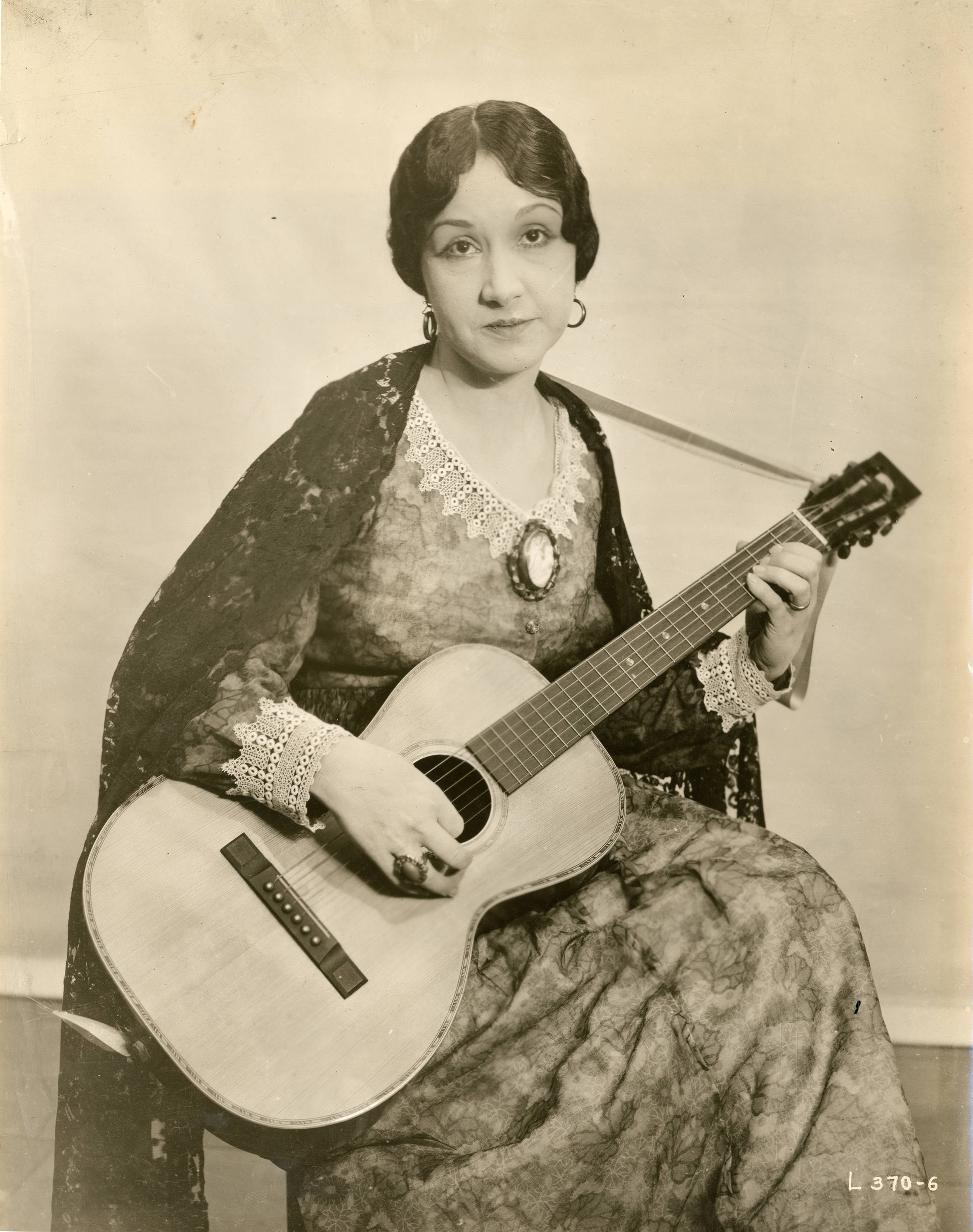
Hollister from the film A Wise Fool (1921)

One of Hollister's most important roles was that of Mary Magdalene in the film From the Manger to the Cross (1912). Filmed on location in Palestine, this film has been selected for preservation in the United States National Film Registry. The Vampire (1913) made her the first recognized vamp in cinema, predating Theda Bara in A Fool There Was (1915). For that role, she was dubbed "the original vampire". She reprised the character in The Vampire's Trail (1914) and The Lotus Woman (1916), her last film for Kalem. In her later career, she mainly appeared in supporting roles.

Her husband died in 1952 and she died in 1973, aged 86, in Costa Mesa, California. She was affected by dementia and vision loss in her old age. They are interred together in the Great Mausoleum, Columbarium of Solace at Forest Lawn Memorial Park Cemetery in Glendale, California.

== Personal life ==
Alice and George K. Hollister had a daughter, Doris Ethel (1906–1990), and a son, George Jr. (1908–1976), both child actors. Doris married cartoonist Walter Lantz in 1930 but divorced several years later. George Jr. would later embark on a photography career.

== Partial filmography ==
- The Further Adventures of the Girl Spy (1910)
- By a Woman's Wit (1911)
- The Colleen Bawn (1911)
- The Fishermaid of Ballydavid (1911)
- His Mother (1912)
- The Vagabonds (1912)
- Far From Erin's Isle (1912)
- You Remember Ellen (1912)
- Driving Home the Cows (1912)
- An Arabian Tragedy (1912)
- A Prisoner of the Harem (1912)
- The Poacher's Pardon (1912)
- From the Manger to the Cross (1912)
- The Kerry Gow (1912)
- Ireland, the Oppressed (1912)
- The Shaughraun (1912)
- A Sawmill Hazard (1913)
- A Desperate Chance (1913)
- The Scimitar of the Prophet (1913)
- The Vampire (1913)
- The Vampire's Trail (1914)
- A Celebrated Case (1914)
- The Siren's Reign (1915)
- The Lotus Woman (1916)
- Her Better Self (1917)
- The Great Lover (1920)
- Milestones (1920)
- A Voice in the Dark (1921)
- A Wise Fool (1921)
- The Forgotten Law (1922)
- Married Flirts (1924)
- The Dancers (1925)
