= Laurene Santley =

American actress

Laurene Santley (1868–1933) was an American stage and silent film actress. She appeared in the Sidney Olcott films The Lad from Old Ireland (1910), The Irish in America (1915), and All for Old Ireland. She was the mother of actors Joseph Santley and Fred Santley.

== Career ==
Santley was a stage actress for several years. In late 1903 and early 1904, she toured the United States in the melodramatic play From Rags to Riches by Charles A. Taylor alongside her son Joseph, who was twelve years old at the time. Joseph Santley had reportedly been acting alongside his mother from the age of 4. Santley appeared in stage productions of Macbeth in 1909 and Peg o' My Heart in 1914.

In 1910 and 1915, Santley appeared in three films directed by Sidney Olcott: Lad from Old Ireland, All for Old Ireland, and The Irish in America. In The Lad from Old Ireland (1910), she appeared with Gene Gauntier, Thomas O'Connor, J.P. McGowan, Jane Wolfe, and Agnes Mapes. In All for Old Ireland, she appeared with Valentine Grant and Pat O'Malley, and in The Irish in America, she acted alongside Grant, Arthur Donaldson, and Charles McConnell. She retired around 1928 and moved to Los Angeles in 1929.

== Personal life ==
Santley was born Laurene Smith in Salt Lake City, Utah, in 1868. She married Thomas Mansfield and was a member of the Mansfields, a stage family. She had a daughter, Hattie Hilta Bidle, and two sons, Joseph and Frederick, both of whom became prominent figures in the film industry. Following the death of her husband, she married the actor Eugene Santley.

Santley died of a heart attack in Los Angeles on September 23, 1933, at the age of 65. She was entombed at Forest Lawn Memorial Park in Glendale.
