= In the Hands of a Brute =

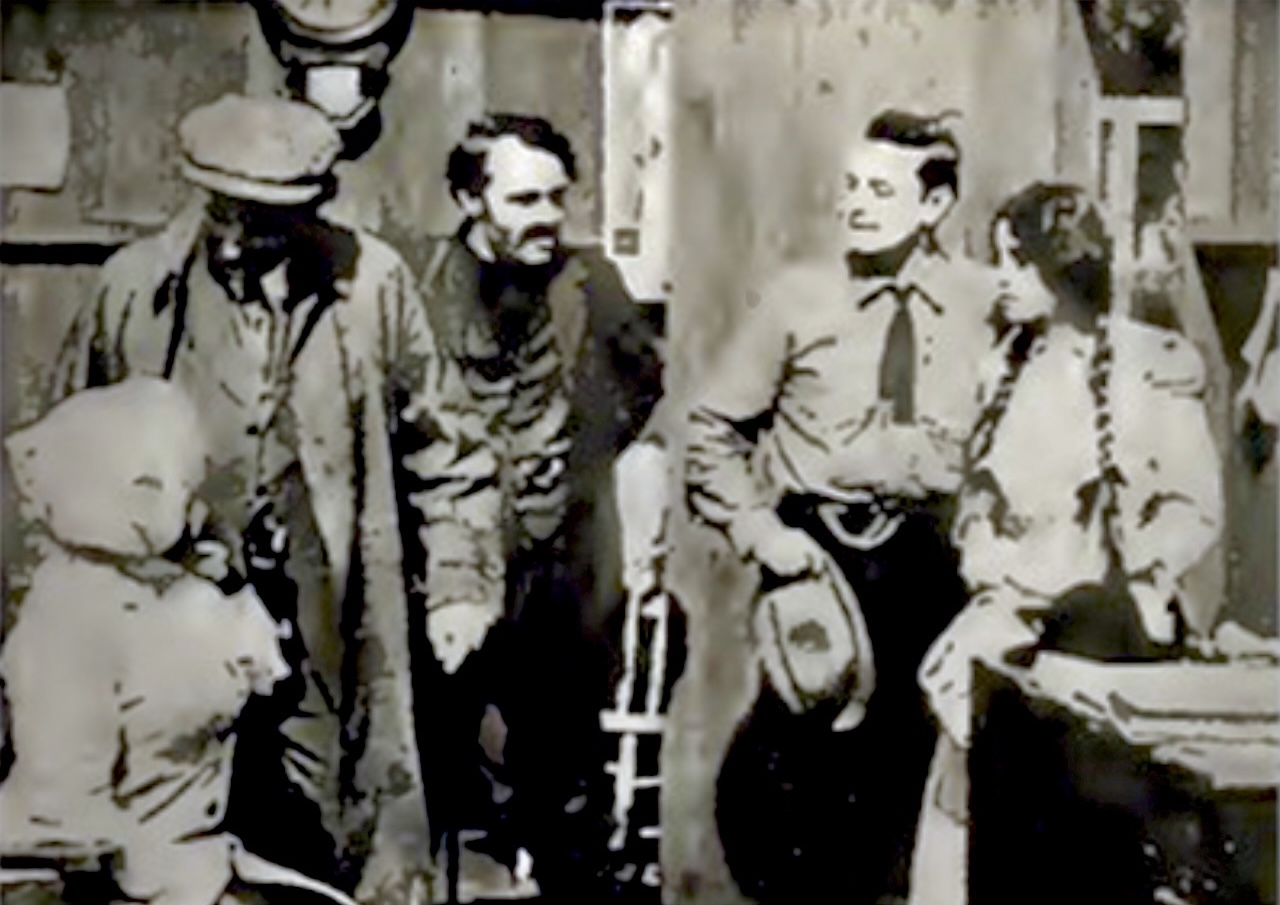
- Valentine Grant (right)
- Directed by: Sidney Olcott
- Produced by: Sid Films
- Starring: Valentine Grant; Arthur Donaldson; Sidney Olcott
- Distributed by: Warner's Features
- Release date: April 13, 1914
- Running time: 3 reels
- Country: United States
- Languages: Silent; English intertitles

In the Hands of a Brute is a 1914 American silent film produced by Sid Films and distributed by Warner's Features. It was directed by Sidney Olcott with himself, Valentine Grant, and Arthur Donaldson in the leading roles.

== Cast ==
- Valentine Grant - Nell
- Arthur Donaldson -
- James Vincent - Walter Roberts
- Walter Chapin -
- Roy Cheldon -
- Sidney Olcott -

== Production notes ==
The film was shot in Jacksonville, Fla.
