= Taint =

Taint or tainted may refer to:

== Impurities ==
- Contamination, the presence of a minor and unwanted constituent
  - Wine fault, an unpleasant characteristic of wine
  - Infection, an invasion of an organism's body by pathogenic agents
  - Taint (legal), the quality of illegally obtained court evidence
  - Taint checking, a computer language security feature

== Titles ==
- The Taint (novel) or Doctor Who and the Taint, a novel written by Michael Collier and based on the British television series Doctor Who
- Taint (band), a sludge-metal band from Wales
- The Taint (film), a 1915 American silent film
- Tainted (film), a 1987 American film
- "Tainted" (song), a 2002 song by Slum Village featuring Dwele

== Other uses ==
- Taint (anatomy), colloquial name for the space between the anus and genitals; the perineum
- Tint, an archaic form, referring to a color mixed with white
- Tainted kernel, when proprietary modules are loaded into Linux
