= Leisure Class =

Leisure class is an alternative term for upper class. It may also refer to

- The Theory of the Leisure Class, seminal 1899 economics work
- Leisure Class (band), American rock band
- The Leisure Class, 2015 American film

== See also ==
- Old money
- Gentry
- Ruling class
- Café society
- Jet set
- Leisure
- The Idle Rich (disambiguation)
