= Bertha Kalich =

American actress

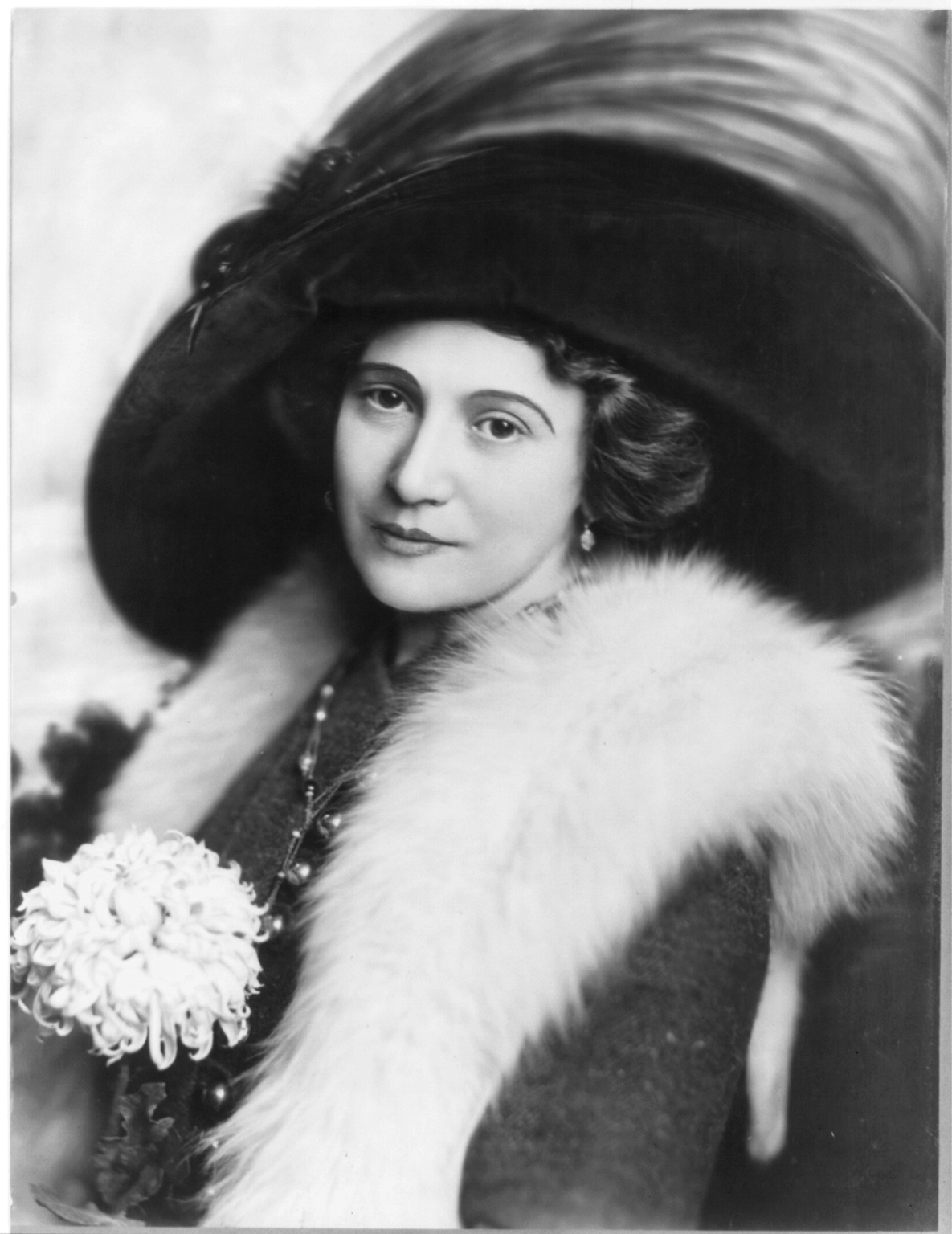
- Kalich in 1910
- Born: Beylke Kalakh; 17 May 1874; Lemberg, Galicia, Austria-Hungary
- Died: 18 April 1939 (aged 64); Queens, New York, US
- Other name: Bertha Kalish
- Education: Lemberg Conservatory
- Occupation: Actress
- Known for: Performing in American Yiddish Theatre
- Spouse: Leopold Spachner (m.1890)
- Children: 2

Bertha Kalich (also spelled Kalish, born Beylke Kalakh; 17 May 1874 – 18 April 1939) was a Jewish-American actress. Though she was well-established as an entertainer in Eastern Europe, she is best remembered as one of the several "larger-than-life" figures that dominated New York stages during the "Golden Age" of American Yiddish Theatre during the late nineteenth and early twentieth century. Historians estimate that, during her career, Kalich performed more than 125 different roles in seven different languages.

== Life and career ==
=== Early life ===
Kalich was born Beylke Kalakh in Lemberg, Galicia, Austria-Hungary (today Lviv, Ukraine), the only child of Solomon Kalakh, a poor brush manufacturer and amateur violinist. Her mother was Babette Halber Kalakh, a seamstress who often made costumes for local theaters. Babette was an active opera fan and her devotion inspired a love for the stage in her daughter. They often attended performances together and when young Bertha came of age, her parents scraped together their meager funds to send her to private music and drama schools. At age thirteen, she joined the chorus of the local Polish theater and later attended the prestigious Lemberg Conservatory.

While still barely a teen, Kalich sang in the chorus for La Traviata in the Lviv Polish Theatre Opera. A fellow actor, Max Gimpel, then offered her a job at his pioneering Yiddish-language theater group run by Yankev Ber Gimpel. During this period of her life, Kalich had been performing in Polish, Russian, and German. When Gimpel's leading lady left for America, Kalich became his prima donna, winning the title role in Avrom Goldfaden's operetta Shulamis.

After a series of performances in Budapest, Goldfaden offered her a permanent position with his company, and Kalich left later that year for Romania. She was able to pick up Romanian in a matter of months, and was subsequently able to appear in major roles there with the state theater. According to historian Daniel Soyer, "she was such a success that anti-Semitic theatergoers, who had come with the intention of pelting her with onions, threw flowers instead."

Kalich married Leopold Spachner in 1890 at the age of 16. They had two children, a son Arthur (who died young) and a daughter Lilian.

=== Coming to America ===
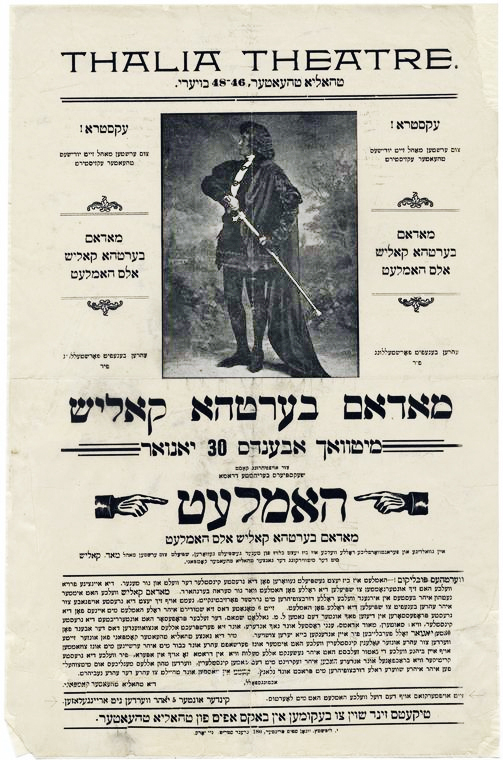
A placard for the Thalia Yiddish Theatre's production of Hamlet starring "Madam Bertha Kalish" in the title role

Even at that age, Kalich already had a major career in at least three countries and four languages. Her success prompted jealousies, however and in 1894 there was rumored to be an assassination plot in the works by some of her rivals.

His newly founded Thalia Theater was looking for fresh talent, and there Kalich appeared in Di Vilde Kenigin (The wild queen) and a Yiddish production of La Belle Hélène (Beautiful Helen). She reprised former roles of Shulamis, Juliette, and Desdemona in a number of Yiddish-language productions.

In her new home, Kalich set out to emphasize her dramatic skills over her musical talents, working hard as a proponent of the Yiddish theater movement, hoping to help the theatres gain credibility in addition to notoriety. Anti-semitism in America had initially led audiences to believe that Jewish immigrants were incapable of producing anything more than low-brow, minstrel entertainment, but the Thalia had made a name for itself with its revolutionary Yiddish-language translations of Shakespeare. Kalich played a number of roles in these landmark works, even beating out the other male stars for a chance to play the coveted role of Hamlet.

According to Yiddish theatre scholar Joel Berkowitz, Shakespeare's plays served "as both sources and symbols" in helping Jewish immigrants "cross the bridge from Yiddish to American culture." It didn't hurt that fans compared Kalich to another famous female Hamlet of the era, Sarah Bernhardt, and in fact many newspapers would go on to call her the "Jewish Berhardt" in the years to come.

In addition to her work with Shakespeare, Kalich's performance in Leon Kobrin's The East Side Ghetto won enormous critical praise and increased Kalich's fanbase outside of the Jewish community. This production in combination with her performances in playwright Jacob Gordin's didactic plays brought unprecedented attention to the Yiddish stage. In 1900, she starred as Freydenyu in the premiere of Gordin's God, Man and the Devil, and that prompted Gordin to write the role of Etty in The Kreutzer Sonata and the title role in his Sappho and Phaon especially for Kalich. These productions made it out of the Yiddish playhouses, going all the way to Broadway, and establishing Kalich as a household name.

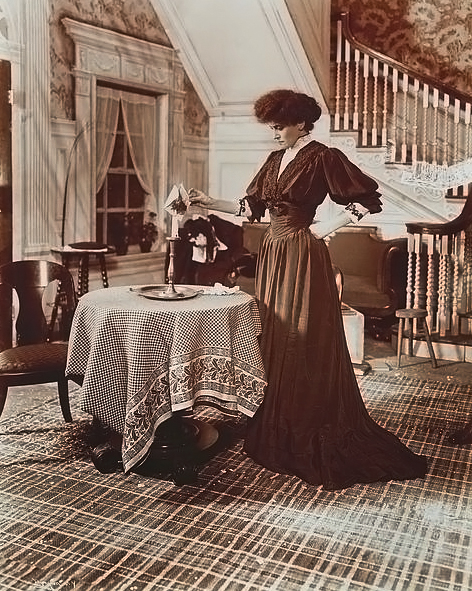
Kalich as Miriam Friedlander in The Kreutzer Sonata, a play based on a story by Leo Tolstoy, adapted from Yiddish play Jacob Gordin by Langdon Mitchell; performed on Broadway, 1906.

Along with her male counterpart Boris Thomashefksy (1868–1939), Kalich became a darling of the press, admired by her fans and critics alike. According to theatre historian Henry Bial, minorities in American had not yet seen such accolades:

[They] were celebrated in the Yiddish press and idolized by Jewish audiences. They were the royalty of American Jewry, embodying the immigrant success story and enjoying a celebrity attained by few Jewish artists before or since. Thanks to the exalted status of its stars, the Yiddish theatre itself has come to play a central role in the narrative of Jewish inmmigration to the United States.

Her roles tended to be "women of the world", such as the title characters she played in Pierre Berton and Charles Simon's play Zaza, Victorien Sardou's Fédora (1905), Sappho and Phaon, and Magda in Hermann Sudermann's Heimat. Under the tutelage of Harrison Grey Fiske, she gained in reputation, eventually going on to star in plays such as Maeterlinck's Monna Vanna.

=== On the decline ===
By 1910, though, "she was having trouble finding suitable roles in the light American theater for her more emotional and tragic style."

She left New York for Hollywood in 1914, where she appeared in a few notable films, including a reprise of her hit Broadway role in Marta of the Lowlands. Success was short-lived, however, and by 1915, Kalich was frequently returning to Yiddish roles to supplement her income. Her mainstream success in the American theatrical world enhanced her prestige there, and she began to receive top billing at the Second Avenue Theatre alongside stars like David Kessler.

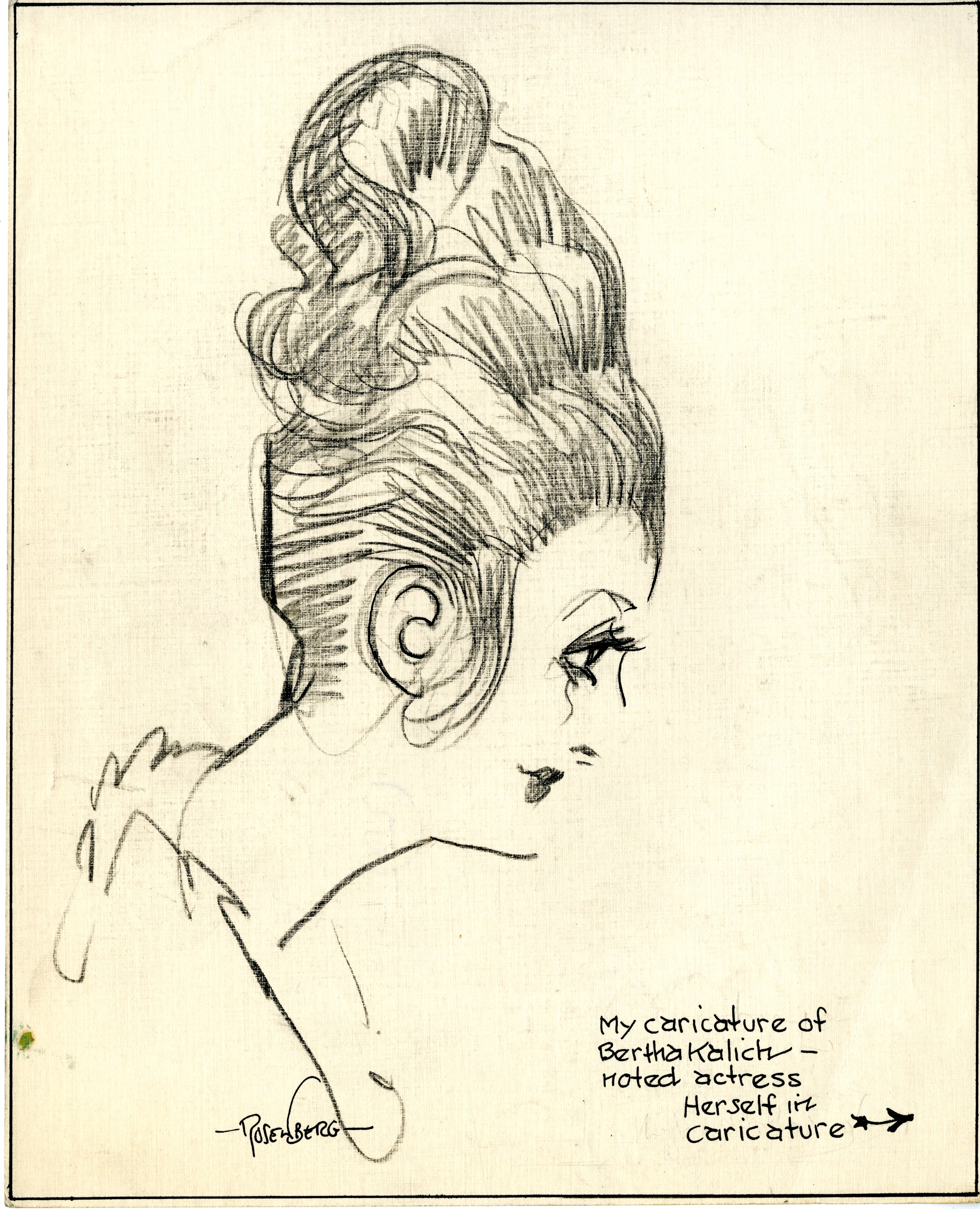
Manuel Rosenberg caricature of Bertha Kalich

== Later years ==
By the late 1920s, Kalich's eyesight was failing, and she gradually became blind. Though she officially retired in 1931, she continued to appear onstage occasionally, especially at evenings mounted in her honor that served to elevate her legacy in the Yiddish theatre community. Late in her life, she recorded scenes from Goldfaden's historical plays for "The Forward Hour" on radio station WEVD, but her poor health meant that she needed to rehearse long, grueling hours even for short parts. Her last public appearance came on February 23, 1939, at a benefit for her at the Jolson Theater, where she recited the final scene of Louis Untermeyer's poem Heine's Death.

== Death ==
Bertha Kalich died on 18 April 1939, aged 64, from undisclosed causes. Her remains were interred at Mount Hebron Cemetery in Flushing, Queens, New York.

Fifteen hundred people attended her funeral, considered a disappointing turnout, considering her status in the Jewish community. She had come to be seen as "a relic of the theatrical past, with a manner too romantic and grand even for the Yiddish stage", Soyer notes. "But, nevertheless, in the prime of her career at the beginning of the twentieth century, Kalich played an important role in efforts to improve the artistic standards of the Yiddish theater, whose status she also helped to raise with her success with English-speaking audiences."

== Works ==
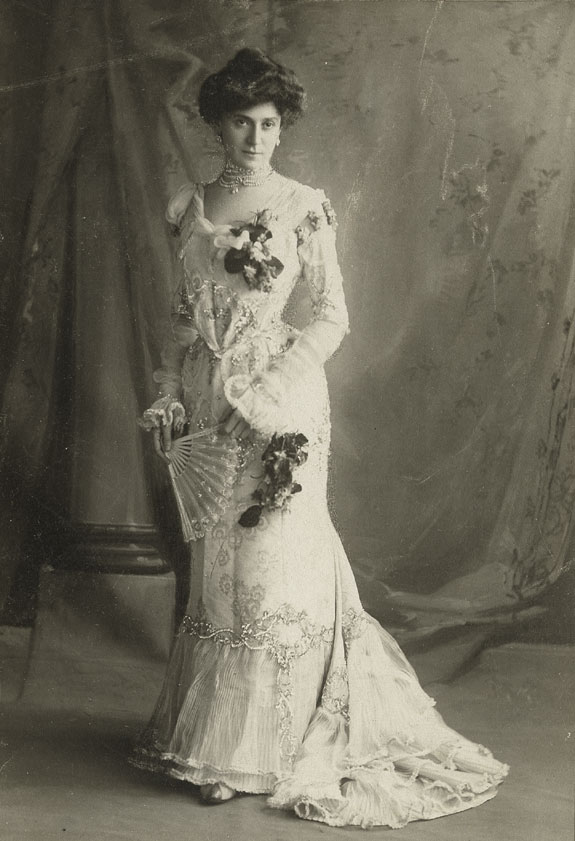
Kalich, c. 1900

=== Theatre ===
- Fedora [Revival] by Victorien Sardou. Prod. George Fawcett. American Theatre, New York. 22 May 1905 - May 1905.
- Monna Vanna by Maurice Maeterlinck, Trans. John Severance. Prod. Harrison Grey Fiske. Manhattan Theatre, New York. 23 October 1905 - December 1905. [Giovanna]
- The Kreutzer Sonata [Revival] adapted from the Yiddish play written by Jacob Gordin by Langdon Mitchell, based on a story by Leo Tolstoy. Dir. Harrison Grey Fiske. Lyric Theatre, New York. 10 September 1906 - September 1906. [Miriam Friedlander]
- Sappho and Phaon by Percy MacKaye, music by A. A. Stanley. Des. Frank E. Gates, E. A. Morange, and Percy Anderson. Prod. Harrison Grey Fiske. Lyric Theatre, New York. 21 October 1907 - October 1907.
- Marta of the Lowlands by Àngel Guimerà. Des. Frank E. Gates and E. A. Morange. Prod. Harrison Grey Fiske. Garden Theatre, New York. 24 March 1908 - April 1908.
- The Witc' by Hans Wiers-Jenssen, book adapted by Hermann Hagedorn. Prod. Lee Shubert and J.J. Shubert. New Theatre, New York. 14 February 1910
- Rachel by Carina Jordan. Prod. F. C. Whitney. Knickerbocker Theatre, New York. 1 December 1913 - December 1913.
- The Riddle: Woman by Charlotte E. Wells and Dorothy Donnelly. Prod. George Mooser. Harris Theatre, New York. 23 October 1918 - March 1919
- Jitta's Atonement by George Bernard Shaw, adapted from the play by Siegfried Trebitsch. Dir. Lester Lonergan. Prod. Lee Shubert. Comedy Theatre, New York. 17 January 1923 - February 1923. [Jitta Lenkheim]
- The Kreutzer Sonata [Revival] adapted from the Yiddish play Jacob Gordin by Langdon Mitchell, based on a story by Leo Tolstoy. Prod. Lee Shubert. Frazee Theatre, New York. 14 May 1924 - June 1924. [Miriam Friedlander]
- Magda [Revival] by Hermann Sudermann, Trans. Charles Edward Amory Winslow. Dir. Edgar J. MacGregor. 49th Street Theatre, New York. 26 January 1926 - February 1926. [Magda]

=== Film ===
- The Bomb Boy by Bertram Millhauser. Dir. George Fitzmaurice. Manhattan Film Company, 1914.
- Marta of the Lowlands based on the play by Àngel Guimerà. Dir. J. Searle Dawley. USA, 1914. [Marta]
- Slander, by Will S. Davis. Dir. Will S. Davis. with Eugene Ormonde and Mayme Kelso. Fox Film Corp, 1916. [Helene Ayers]
- Ambition by Mary Murillo. Dir. James Vincent. Fox Film Corp, 1916. [Marian Powers]
- Love and Hate by Mary Murillo, based on a story by James R. Garey. Dir. James Vincent. Fox Film Corp, 1916. [Helen Sterling]
