= Coates Opera House =

Coordinates: 39.102723°N 94.588591°W

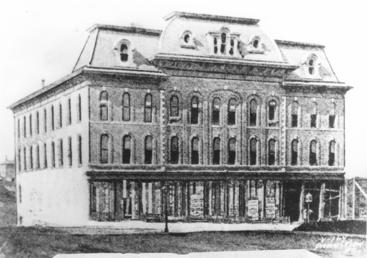
Exterior view of Coates Opera House

The Coates Opera House was a prominent performing arts venue and cultural landmark in Kansas City, Missouri from its founding in 1870 to its destruction in a fire in 1901. It was built by Kersey Coates, a local hotelier. The House was the first legitimate theater in Kansas City. It was located on the northwest corner of 10th and Broadway.

Heart and Sword, starring Walker Whiteside and Leilia Wolstan was the last performance in the theatre.

Playwright and actor John A. Stevens managed the opera house for the 1871–72 and 1872–73 seasons (its second and third seasons).
