= Exclusive (film) =

1937 film by Alexander Hall

- Theatrical release poster
- Directed by: Alexander Hall
- Screenplay by: Jack Moffitt; Sidney Salkow; Rian James
- Produced by: Benjamin Glazer
- Starring: Fred MacMurray; Frances Farmer; Charlie Ruggles; Lloyd Nolan; Fay Holden; Ralph Morgan
- Cinematography: William C. Mellor
- Edited by: Paul Weatherwax
- Music by: John Leipold; Milan Roder
- Production company: Paramount Pictures
- Distributed by: Paramount Pictures
- Release date: August 6, 1937
- Running time: 85 minutes
- Country: United States
- Language: English

Exclusive is a 1937 American crime drama directed by Alexander Hall and written by Jack Moffitt, Sidney Salkow and Rian James. The film stars Fred MacMurray, Frances Farmer, Charlie Ruggles, Lloyd Nolan, Fay Holden and Ralph Morgan. The film was released on August 6, 1937, by Paramount Pictures.

== Plot ==
Cleared of a crime, gangster Charles Gillette seeks vengeance against Mountain City townspeople who sought to put him behind bars, including Colonel Bogardus, owner of the influential Mountain City World newspaper. Gillette buys the Sentinel, rival to the World, and tries to hire star reporter Ralph Houston to be his editor, but Ralph declines.

Gillette then uses Ralph's girlfriend, Vina Swain, to dig up dirt on his enemies. A story on mayoral candidate Horace Mitchell smears his reputation and results in a suicide. Tod Swain, an editor at the World, chastises Vina for her poor judgment. Gillette then sets out to ruin a department store owner by having henchman Beak McArdle arrange an elevator accident that causes deaths as well as serious injury to Ralph.

Vina's own life is in peril when Gillette then orders McArdle to murder her so she can never tell what she knows. Tod helps her return safely, then tricks Gillette into a confession about the elevator accident. The Sentinel is sold to the town, with a recovered Ralph deciding to run it.

== Cast ==
- Fred MacMurray as Ralph Houston
- Frances Farmer as Vina Swain
- Charlie Ruggles as Tod Swain
- Lloyd Nolan as Charles Gillette
- Fay Holden as Mrs. Swain
- Ralph Morgan as Horace Mitchell
- Edward H. Robins as Colonel Bogardus
- Harlan Briggs as Springer
- Willard Robertson as Mr. Franklin
- Horace McMahon as Beak McArdle
- William Mansell as Formby
- Steve Pendleton as Elliott
- Chester Clute as Garner
- Irving Bacon as Dr. Boomgarten
- Frank Bruno as Lollipop
- James Blakeley as Mr. Walton
- Sam Hayes as Radio Announcer

== Reception ==
Writing for Night and Day in 1937, Graham Greene gave the film a mildly good review, noting that it gives "the general impression [...] of slow old-fashioned sentiment [whose] result, like lavender, is not unagreeable". Characterizing the film as "a routine film of American newspaper life", Greene gave mixed reactions to the scenes, praising the elevator crash scene but finding himself disappointed by the precious delivery of the final scenes with the daughter speaking of her dead father.

Modern Screen’s Leo Townsend described the film as "an exciting, and at times, superior newspaper film" but he felt there were "inconsistencies" in the way Frances Farmer’s character was written that "served to weaken the picture." Townsend praised the performances and wrote, "Despite her role, Frances Farmer does a first-rate job which should entitle her to better things from the powers-that-be in the future. Fred MacMurray gives an honest portrayal … and Charlie Ruggles, in his first serious role, almost steals the picture. Best in the supporting cast are Lloyd Nolan, Ralph Morgan and Fay Holden."

The Film Daily described the film as "fast-moving and exciting" and wrote "Newspaper men may criticize technique and procedure, but the film undoubtedly has punch and entertainment for the fans." Motion Picture Daily reviewed the film as an "exciting melodrama spiced with enough comedy to make it an entertaining film of general appeal." It noted that "Frances Farmer continues her climb to stardom [and] Fred MacMurray turns in a realistic performance as the assistant city editor." Motion Picture Herald stated that the film should prove to be a money maker as it was "vividly gripping" and "well prepared, acted, directed and produced."

Variety wrote a negative review, describing the film as a "hodgepodge" and a "disappointment lacking in originality and without benefit of good workmanship in direction or writing." The reviewer noted that the acting was good, and that Fred MacMurray, Frances Farmer, Charlie Ruggles and Lloyd Nolan gave the best performances, but were unable to overcome the deficiencies in the direction and storyline.Harrison's Reports also provided a negative review and found the storyline to be "distasteful." It wrote, "This lurid newspaper melodrama offers fairly exciting but not particularly pleasurable entertainment; the story is, for the most part, extremely far-fetched."
