= Edward H. Robins =

American actor (1881–1955)

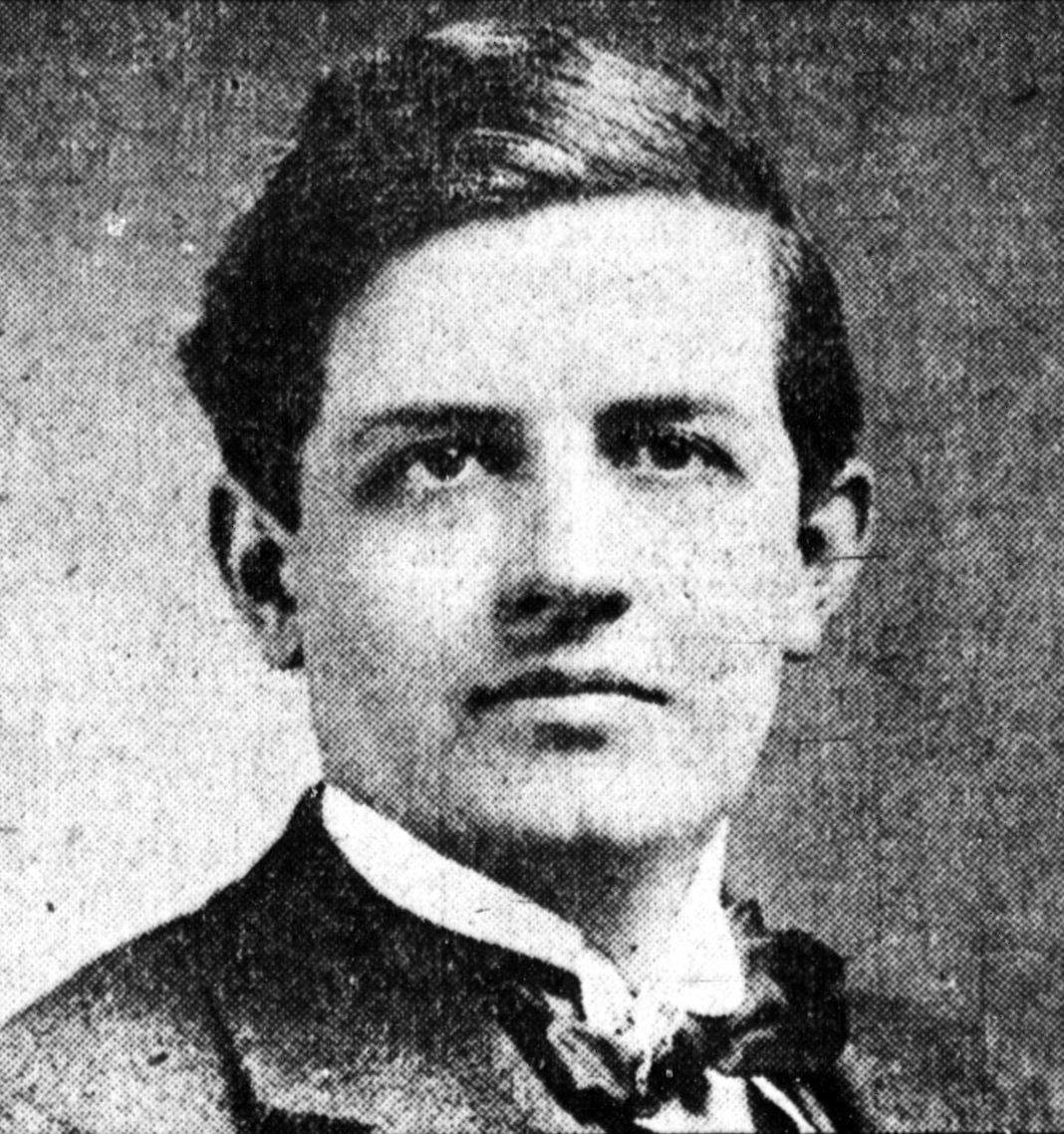
- Born: Edward Haas; October 15, 1881; Shamokin, Pennsylvania, U.S.
- Died: July 27, 1955 (aged 73)
- Occupation: Actor
- Spouse(s): Reina Bond; Sydney Shields

Edward Haas Robins (October 15, 1881 – July 27, 1955) was an American actor.

== Early years ==
Robins was born Edward Haas on October 15, 1881, in Shamokin, Pennsylvania. His parents were Samuel Williamson Haas and Lennora Robins Haas. A graduate of Shamokin High School, he worked for The Shamokin Dispatch newspaper, becoming city editor when he was 19 years old. He had a yen for acting, however, and in 1900 a practical joke led to his transition to that career. A prank telegram caused him to go to Philadelphia, thinking that he had the part of the king in Hamlet. Once there, he learned that the telegram was a joke, but he made his stage debut portraying Bernado in the Auditorium Theatre.

== Career ==
=== Stage ===
Robins quit the Auditorium Theater company when it was to tour the southern United states. Instead, he formed his own theatrical company. He also acted in Chicago with the Bush Temple stock company. David Belasco employed Robins in 1908 to co-star in The Easiest Way, Robins's Broadway debut. George M. Cohan hired him in 1916 to portray Hiram Draper in So This Is London, and Robins first appeared in the city of London in that play in 1923.

Beginning in 1913, Robins led a theatrical troupe each summer At the Royal Alexandra Theatre in Toronto. He also established a regular-season theatrical company there, and during World War I, it was Canada's largest stock theater company. Robins's final Broadway play was The Front Page (1946).

Robins also directed plays, and he was a member of the executive staff of Actors' Equity Association from 1928 to 1930.

=== Canadian film company ===
In April 1914, Robins initiated the formation of the Conness-Till Film Company in Canada. James and Charles Beury, financiers from Philadelphia, were the main investors. The company was named for Luke Edwin Conness, who worked in theater in New York and had directed films for the Biograph Company and Louis A. Till, a businessman in Toronto. Newspaper ads from investment brokers Culver & Company offered individuals an opportunity at $100 per share to own part of a company that would make “Canadian photo plays with distinctive Canadian settings and written by Canadians.” Robins was designated as the star of the company's films, with Clara Whipple as the leading lady. Robins also wrote for The Toronto Sunday World, using his weekly column to give readers insights about the motion-picture industry.

In 1915, Beury bought out or fired Conness and Till and changed the company's name to Beury Feature Film Company. Robins and grocer J. A. Macdonald were his partners in the revised enterprise, with Robins supervising the company's daily operations. The owners' plans were dashed, however, when the studio was destroyed by fire. Contents that were lost included equipment, costumes, and furniture, with the value of the loss estimated at $75,000 or more. Insurance covered $12,000 or less. Soon after the fire, Robins told reporters that the company would not try to resume making films in Canada.

=== American films ===
American-made films in which Robins appeared included Exclusive (1937), Meet the Missus, (1937) and Music for Madame (1937).

== Personal life and death ==
Robins was married to Reina Bond and Sydney Shields. He was a member of the Garrick Club and The Lambs. On July 27, 1955, Robins died in Bergen Pines Hospital, aged 74.
