= Tricking the Government =

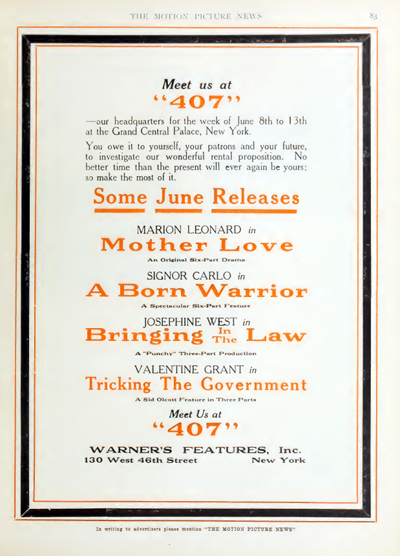
- Advertising published by The Motion Picture News, Vol 10, p 83.
- Directed by: Sidney Olcott
- Produced by: Sid Films
- Starring: Valentine Grant; Arthur Donaldson
- Distributed by: Warner's Features
- Release date: June 1914
- Running time: 3 reels
- Country: United States
- Languages: Silent; English intertitles

Tricking the Government is a 1914 American silent film produced by Sid Films and distributed by Warner's Features. It was directed by Sidney Olcott with Valentine Grant and Arthur Donaldson in the leading roles.

== Cast ==
- Valentine Grant
- Arthur Donaldson

== Production notes ==
The film was shot in Florida.
