= Walker Whiteside =

American actor (1869–1942)

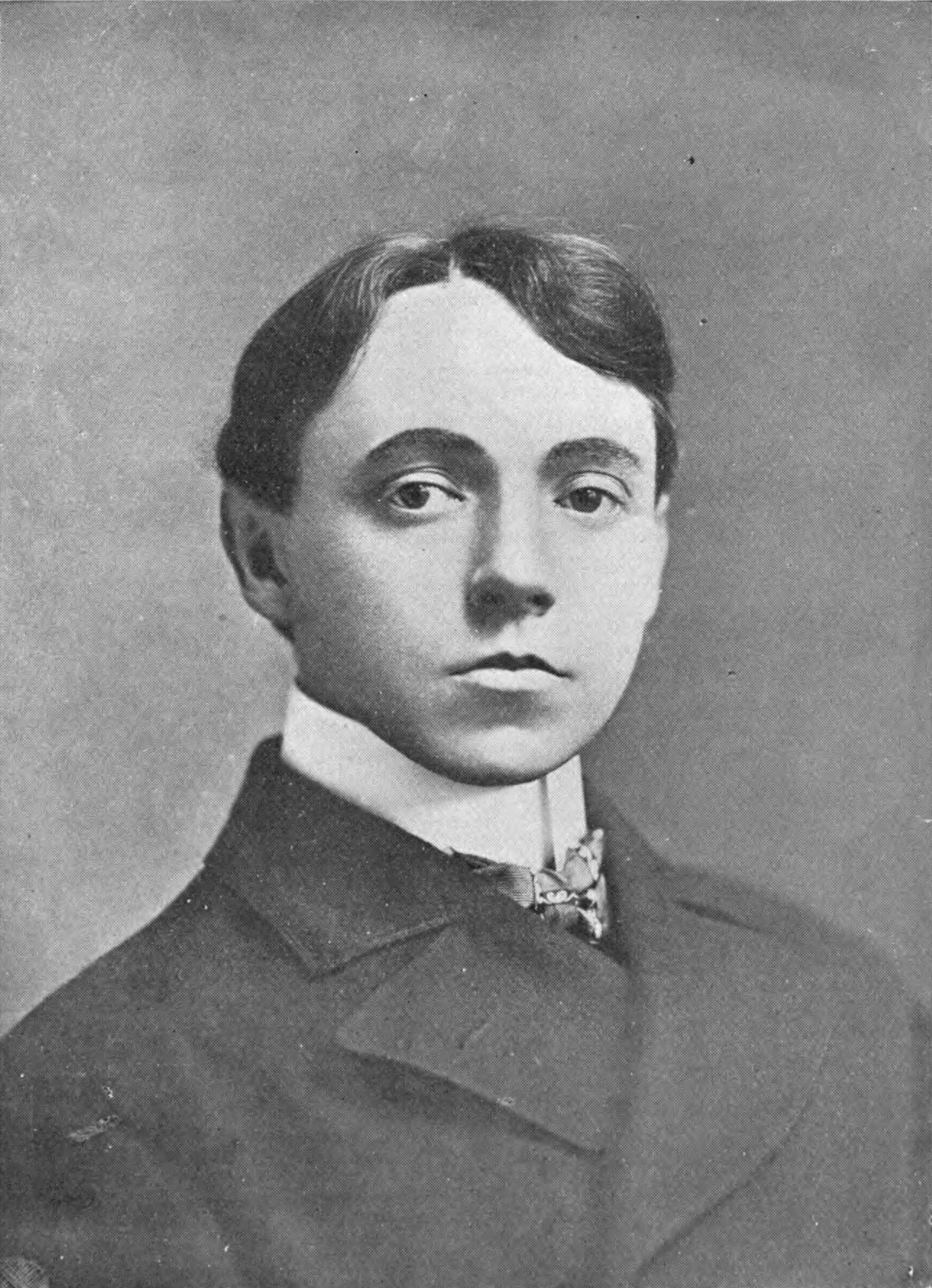
- Whiteside, c. 1900
- Born: March 16, 1869; Logansport, Indiana, U.S.
- Died: August 17, 1942 (aged 73); Hastings-on-Hudson, NY, U.S.
- Occupation: Stage actor
- Years active: 1884–1935
- Spouse: Leila Wolston McCord
- Children: 1

Walker Whiteside (1869–1942) was an American actor who had played Hamlet, Othello, King Lear, and Shylock while still in his teens.

== Early life ==
Walker Whiteside was born on March 16, 1869, near the confluence of the Wabash and Eel rivers at Logansport in northern Indiana. He was a child of Thomas C. and Lavina (née Walker) Whiteside. He had a sister, Matilda (Tillie; 6/14/1861-4/25/1884; married Charles K. Allen, 1880; had son, George Allen, 1883) Walker's family would later move to the Chicago suburb of Riverside where his father's law practice afforded them the luxury of two servants. In the years to come, Thomas Whiteside would serve as an Indiana state judge and as a member of the Indiana Supreme Court. Lavina Whiteside was born in Indiana, the daughter of Judge George B. Walker, a native of Maryland who had settled in Logansport.

== Career ==
While in his teens or earlier, Walker Whiteside attended acting classes under the tutelage of Professor Samuel Kayzer of the Dramatic Conservatory of Chicago. His ability there to play roles that would appear to be beyond his years soon drew local media attention as the boy tragedian of Chicago. In October 1884, the not yet sixteen-year-old actor hired Alderman Ford, a theatrical agent from Kansas City and, on November 17, made his professional stage debut in Richard III at Chicago's Grand Opera House. Walker found the experience both terrifying and exhilarating, but knew immediately he had found his calling.

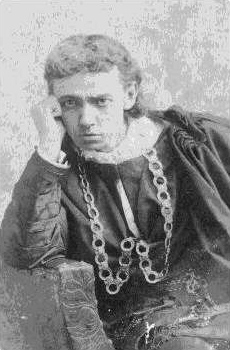
As Hamlet, c. 1890s

He spent much of the following decade or so with Shakespearean companies, touring primarily America's Midwest, before making his New York premier in April 1893 at the Union Square Theatre, playing Hamlet and the title part in Edward Bulwer-Lytton's Richelieu. In 1894, Whiteside again performed Hamlet for the debut season of the Grand Opera House in Traverse City, Michigan. By the dawn of the 20th century, and barely into his thirties, Walker had played Hamlet in some 1,400 productions.

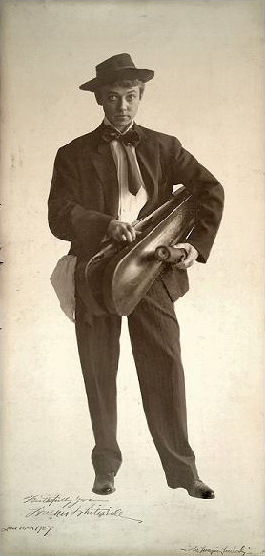
Whiteside, 1907

In the late 1890s, Walker began to swing away from classic production in favor of more contemporary and thus more profitable plays. On January 31, 1901, just fifteen minutes after the final curtain call of Walker's play Heart and Sword, the Coates Opera House in Kansas City caught fire and burned to the ground. By the time the fire had spread from the boiler room, the building had been evacuated, forcing Walker's company to abandon their theatrical gear to the flames. Later, Walker signed with Shipman Brothers in New York, performing romantic and classic plays under their banner until he was able to recoup his losses. Walker's first Broadway hit was in 1909, playing David opposite Chrystal Herne in Israel Zangwill’s The Melting Pot. The play ran for 268 performances at the Comedy Theatre on West 41st Street, and nearly as long a few years later, when he reprieved his role at the Queen’s Theatre in London.

Walker's performance as Wu Li Chang in the play Mr. Wu was so popular that before the premier of a later play he had his press agent release a statement announcing "Mr. Whiteside wishes it known far and wide that this time he is not acting as a sinister Chinaman, educated at Oxford, who wears poison fingernails." Walker played several Asian characters over his career, some evil, at least one not, that were probably comparable to those portrayed in films made in Hollywood over the first half of the twentieth century. Walker Whiteside also appeared in the film adaptation of The Melting Pot in 1915 and three years later in the spy film, The Belgian, directed by Sidney Olcott.

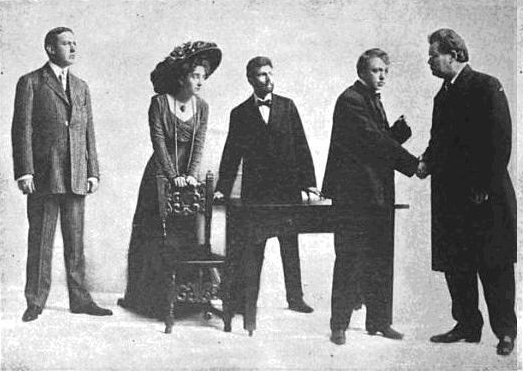
Whiteside (second from right) in The Melting Pot, c. 1908

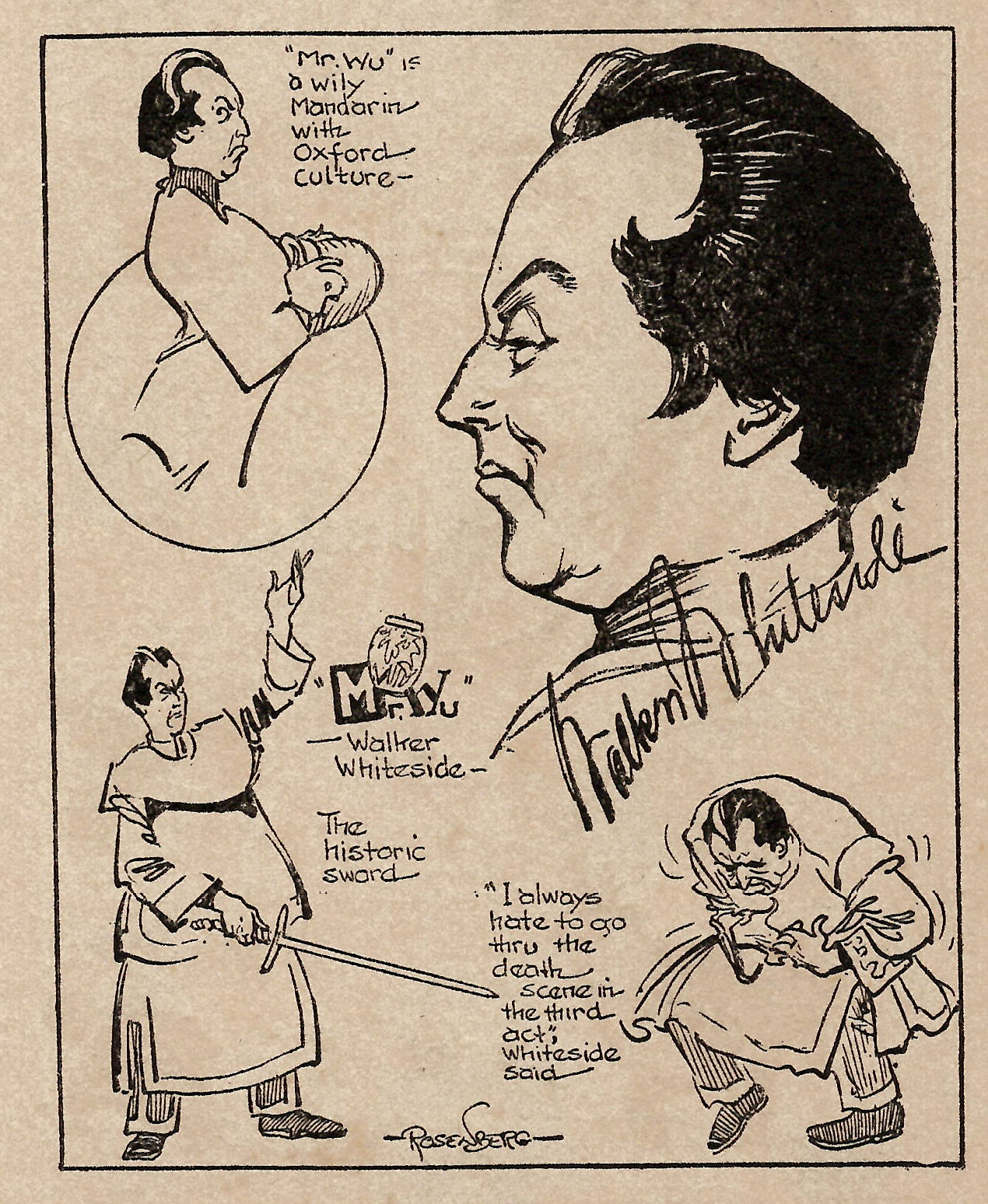
Signed drawing by Manuel Rosenberg 1927

The remainder of Walker's career would be a successful combination of performances on the road and on Broadway. During this period, his leading lady for seven seasons was New Orleans native Sydney Shields. For whatever reason, Walker had several plays that had popular runs on the road that he never brought to Broadway. Until his retirement in 1935, Walker had a large following among Mid-American audiences who considered him one of their own.

== Family ==
On October 19, 1893, in Hamilton, Ontario. Walker Whiteside married actress Leila Wolston McCord (professionally known as Leila Wolston)), the daughter of John Thomas McCord founder of the Mississippi River Steamship Line, Two years later, the couple became the parents of Rosamond Whiteside Pettibone, who, since her parents traveled with vaudeville was sent at an early age to school, as a nun apprentice at the Catholic Abby in MO. Rosemond herself would later go on to be a vaudeville performer and a singer with the St. Louis Opera Company. Rosemond was an acting friend of Helen Hunt, the famous DC stage actress. Rosemond liked Tennis and was one of the early women to play at Wimbleton. Later, Leila Rosemond Whiteside chose to accept the marriage proposal of a tall Episcopalian, John Samuel Pettibone, an heir of the Wayerhouser lumber fortune. He was a WW1 and WW2 Veteran and in 1948 the couple purchased Homewood Farms in Middleburg, Virginia, a grand, historic georgian revival southern mansion on a 260-acre working farm, formerly owned by the Wiley family. The Pettibones staffed their home and farm with local highly skilled workers, mostly from deeply rooted African American families, like Mary Basil, who was meticulous in charge of housekeeping, gorgeously wrapped all the Christmas presents, and was the beloved nanny of the grandchildren.

The Pettibone Farm was on the Fox Hunting Fixture where, Rosamond rode side saddle and Mr. and Mrs. Harriman fox hunted. The home was decorated to the hilt for Christmas, a favorite activity of the former nun apprentice, who was inspired by the Christmas Decorations of Mrs. Rockefeller's Colonial Williamsburg, VA. Social society was invited yearly to Homewood's New Years Day party on Boxing Day. A large Christmas tree, a blue spruce was decorated in lights with a cherry picker by staff and could be seen yearly at the holidays for decades to come from the town. Rosemond was one of the founding members of the Middleburg Tennis Club, where local children and adults learned to play tennis. It is still in operation and a very popular and active club in the USTA. Rosemond and John Pettibone also built the St. Stephen's Catholic Church on some east acreage of Homewood Farms, where JFK and his family attended mass during his presidency when visiting Middleburg. Jackie enjoyed the Fox Hunting in the area.

Also at Homewood farms, The Pettibones bred Triple Crown Bloodline racehorses, Kings Wife, a Bold Ruler Mare and Amerilee, by Amerigo(GB) who was bred by Lord Howard de Walden. They also owned the famous Champion of Champions Hunter Jumper horse, The Duke of Paeonian in the 1960's era. They had two children, Rose Marie (d. 2021) and John. Rose Marie, a devout Catholic, married William Grupp who joined the CIA and they had 4 children. Bill, a Vietnam veteran, (d. 2022) Rosamond, a graphic artist, (d.2020) John Grupp, a PA sportswriter, and Robert Grupp, a former football player who works in the Orlando, FL hospitality industry. His wife Chrissy, a South Florida native and excellent lady fisherman resides with him. Rose Marie moved to Sarasota, FL, after her late husband's passing, and purchased a beautiful home in a new high rise, with floor to ceiling views of the Gulf of Mexico.

Rose Marie's younger brother, John, a Vietnam veteran, married Susan Kay Woodall Pettibone of Weldon, NC, who was crowned Miss North Carolina in the 60's. With her pageant scholarships she attended UNC-Chapel Hill, then Middlebury College, where she earned a Masters Degree in romance languages, and studied Opera singing at the Sorbonne in Paris. She was the solo singer of Classical Sacred music at the Fairfax, VA Christian Science Church for a decade. She was the only daughter of Sue Daughtry Woodall, a lifetime prolific cook starting on her family farm in NC, a life similar to the novel written by a Daughtry relative, Talmadge Farm. Sue was one of the first women to graduate from UVA, and a landlady. She owned a beautiful personal home, a 1900's victorian southern mansion on the main street of Weldon, NC. Sue Daughtry Woodall's brother, Malcomb Daughtry, of Roanoke Rapids, NC, is the grandfather of the famous American Idol 90's Rocker Chris Daughtry. Sue "Mini" Daughtry Woodall was a teacher in WV, when she married Emory Woodall of Hamlin, WV, also a teacher, former football player, and a WW2 veteran, who worked with Senator Rockefeller. With his second wife, Dotty Woodall, known for making the world's best homemade biscuits, he had three sons, Emory, Wayne, and Martin, one of which was an early inventor of the technology of Texas Instruments and a grandchild named Michele Lee Woodall, of Hamlin, WV, who has 3 children. Many other grandchildren and great grandchildren.

John and Susan inherited Homewood Farms, the historic southern mansion that looked like Tara in Gone with the Wind, in the 1980's, and they had 3 children. Michelle Suzanne, John Samuel, and Walker Whiteside's namesake, Walker Whiteside. Michelle Suzanne Pettibone an equestrian since age 8, was in Pony Club to level B, her childhood friend, and now famous host of political talk show, Morning Joe, Mika Brzezinski joined her at Homewood for pony club. Michelle also rode in the Fox Hunt on Homewood. She also, along with Lauren Graham of Gilmore Girl's Fame, and Mark Aldrich of Broadway Newsies, (Mark wrote The Peripherals novels based on his Broadway acting experiences, to rave reviews on Amazon in 2024), together they studied Drama at Langley HS, in McLean, VA under Brian Nelson, an MFA Yale Drama Graduate and later a TV screenwriter in Hollywood. Another Brian Nelson classmate, Brian Price, performed across from Michelle in Garcia Lorca's play, Death. Brian Price continued screenwriting studies at USC with Brian Nelson and now teaches screenwriting in a published manuscript available on Amazon. Michelle, like Walker Whiteside, was a leading Musical Theater actress since age 14, in the Middleburg Players production of Brigadoon, she played Fiona. She subsequently performed in over 35 plays, won scholarships, and Best Actress at the Folger Shakespeare Library in DC. in the early 1980's. She has now a feature film credit on the IMDb. She was Miss Virginia Teen in the 1980's, and was top 5 in a beauty pageant with Sandra Bullock, the film actress whose later film, Miss Congeniality was based on their real-life experiences together in the beauty pageant in NOVA. She was in acting class at UNC-Chapel Hill with fellow student, Reed Diamond of Better Call Saul, where he played Gus' Wine Guy. Also at UNC-Chapel Hill, she was a member of Kappa Delta Sorority. Michelle is a lawyer graduated from Mississippi College School of Law, a Christian University, and the owner and creator of the Mint Julep Society Cooking Show, 2023, which is filmed, where she, since 1994, resides at the south gate of the family estate, Homewood. She wrote the novel, The Hidden 300 on Amazon Kindle in 2012.

Michelle's brothers are, John S. Pettibone 111, a former basketball player and a Duke graduated PA lawyer who married Andrea Pettibone, whose family produced the TV show, The Iron Chef. They have two children, Trever James and London Claire. Michelle's other brother is Walker Whiteside Pettibone, a University of North Texas Jazz musician graduate, and professional musician in New York City, where he played on the famous children's TV show, Blue's Clues, and recorded with Shaggy. He married Missy Dominico of Riverdale, NY, a pop singer who released a number one dance tune in Italy in the 90's.

While residing at Homewood Farms, in the 80's and 90's, Susan Pettibone was very successful in Real Estate, in that she owned several businesses and restored many historic homes in the town of Middleburg, VA. The Plaza, a 1700's duplex, and a stucco SFH were some of them. She also owned and cooked at The Middleburg Country Inn. In NC she owned the Ocean Inn where historically, Andy Griffeth performed in Nags Head. Then she built Fox Run Townhomes, at the south gate of Homewood Farms, with funding from Sue Daughtry Woodall's life savings from her Roanoke Rapids, NC Real Estate Company, founded in the 1930's. Sue Woodall passed away in December 1993. Susan Pettibone passed away in December 1999. Both are buried in Roanoke Rapids, NC. They both loved eating at Ralph's, (pronounced Rafe's) a long-time hometown restaurant famous for their authentic Carolina Bar-B-Q, and still open today off I-95.

== Death ==
Walker Whiteside died on August 17, 1942, at his family residence in Hastings-on-Hudson, a village in the town of Greenburgh, New York, just a few miles north of New York City. He never recovered from a stroke suffered three years earlier. Leila Whiteside died at Hastings-on-Hudson on January 3, 1944, after a short illness. Leila, as did her husband, had taken to the stage at an early age debuting in the play Alabama (1888) at the age of sixteen. She had been a member of Augustin Daly’s stock company for a number of seasons before joining her husband as a co-star in Shakespearean productions throughout much of the 1890s. She retired from the stage after a fifteen-year career.

== Selected plays ==
- The Red Cockade (1899) adaptation/actor/producer (adapted from an English translation of Le Lion Amoureux by Francois Ponsard)
- Heart and Sword (c. 1900) actor/producer/writer
- We Are King (1904) adaptation/actor/producer
- The Magic Melody (1907)
- The Typhoon (1912) actor/producer
- Mr. Wu (1914) actor/director
- The Pawn (1917) actor
- The Little Brother (1918) actor
- The Hindu (1922) actor/producer/writer
- Maverick (1924) actor/producer
- The Arabian (1927) actor
- The Royal Box (1928) actor
- Sakura (1928) actor/producer
- Three Men and a Woman (1932) actor/director
- The Master of Ballantrae (1935) actor
