= Wives at Auction =

1926 film

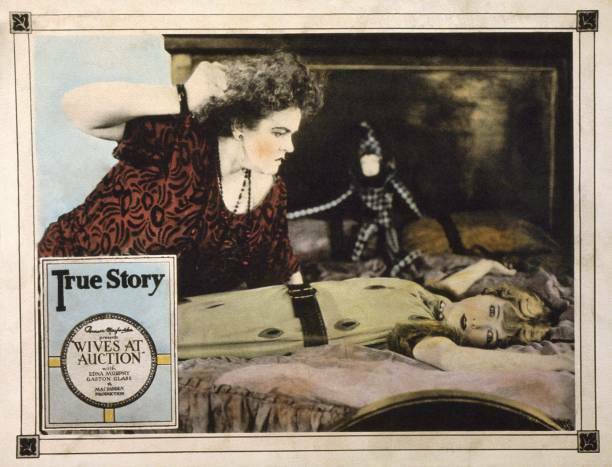
- Directed by: Elmer Clifton
- Written by: Lewis Allen Browne; Elmer Clifton
- Produced by: Bernarr Macfadden
- Starring: Edna Murphy; Gaston Glass; Arthur Donaldson
- Cinematography: Alexander G. Penrod
- Production company: MacFadden True Story Pictures
- Distributed by: Astor Pictures
- Release date: 1926
- Running time: 60 minutes
- Country: United States
- Language: Silent (English intertitles)

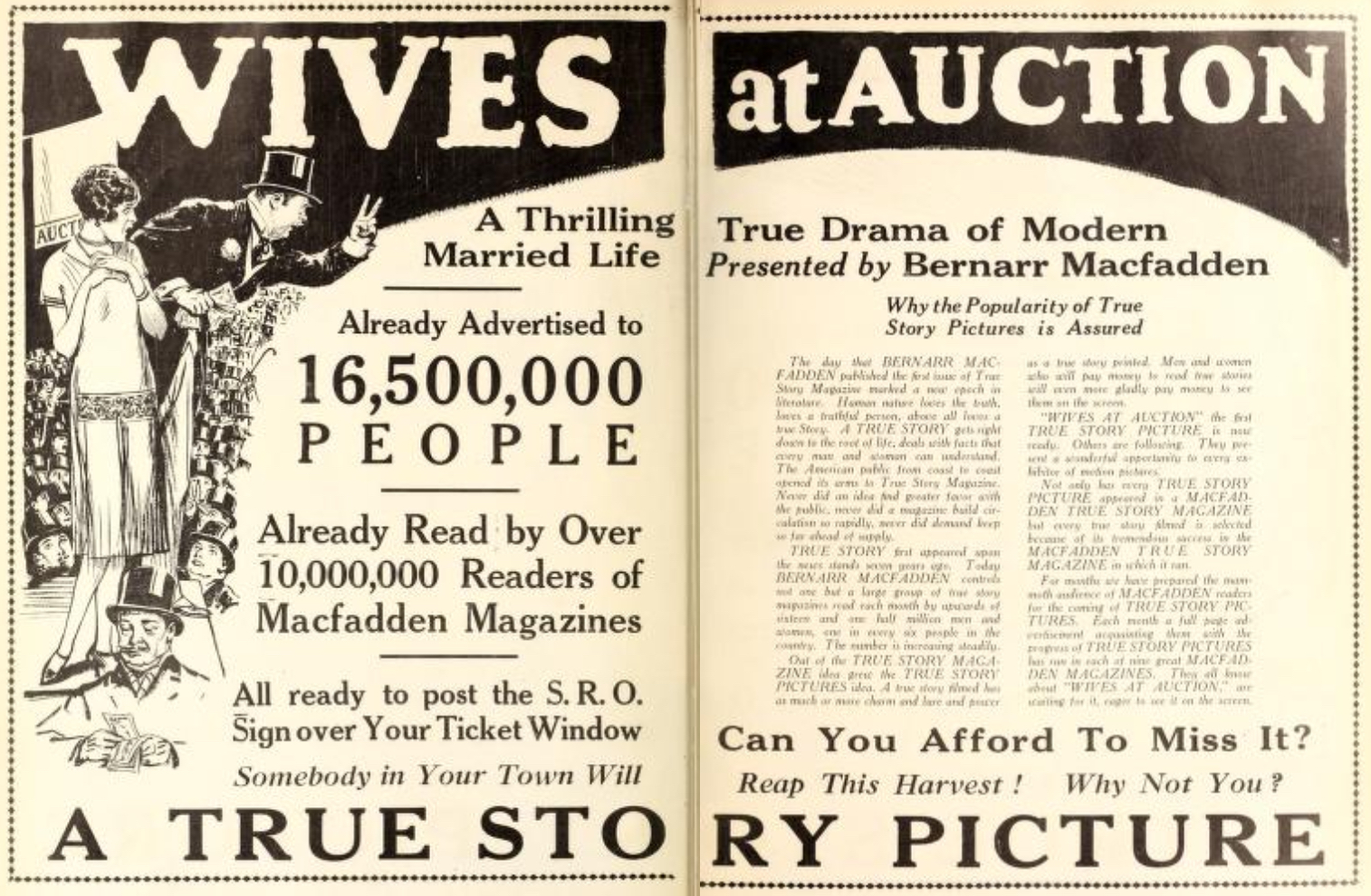
Wives at Auction ad in Motion Picture News, 1926

Wives at Auction is a 1926 American silent drama film directed by Elmer Clifton and starring Edna Murphy, Gaston Glass and Arthur Donaldson. It was shot at the Tec-Art Studio.

== Synopsis ==
Violet Kingston is rescued from an attack by socialite Mark Cameron. Her mother pushes her towards marriage with their wealthy landlord Sylvester Hatch, but she marries Cameron. When Hatch is then found dead suspicion points at Cameron.

== Cast ==
- Edna Murphy as Violet Kingston
- Gaston Glass as Mark Cameron
- Marie Schaefer as Mrs. Kingston - Violet's Stepmother
- Arthur Donaldson as Sylvester Hatch

== Bibliography ==
- Munden, Kenneth White. The American Film Institute Catalog of Motion Pictures Produced in the United States, Part 1. University of California Press, 1997.
