= The Idle Rich =

The Idle Rich may refer to:

- The Idle Rich, 1914 American silent film directed by Sidney Olcott
- The Idle Rich, 1921 American silent comedy film directed by Maxwell Karger
- The Idle Rich, 1929 American comedy film directed by William C. deMille

== See also ==
- The Idle Class, 1921 Charlie Chaplin film
