= When Men Would Kill =

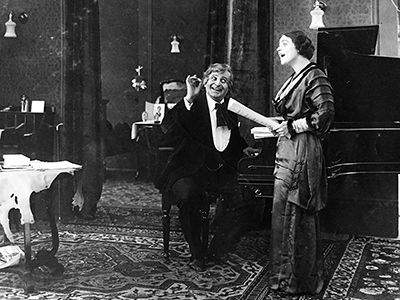
- Valentine Grant
- Directed by: Sidney Olcott
- Produced by: Sid Films
- Starring: Valentine Grant
- Distributed by: Warner's Features
- Release date: March 23, 1914
- Running time: 3 reels
- Country: United States
- Languages: Silent; English intertitles

When Men Would Kill is a 1914 American silent film produced by Sid Films and distributed by Warner's Features. It was directed by Sidney Olcott with Valentine Grant in the leading role.

== Cast ==
- Valentine Grant

== Production notes ==
- The film was shot in Jacksonville, Fla and in New York city.
- It is the first role of Valentine Grant in a film.
