= A Mother of Men =

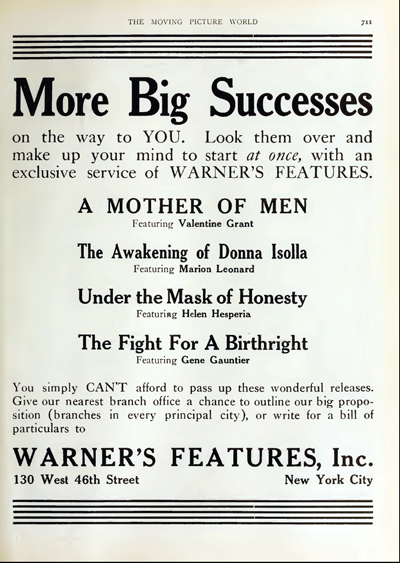
- Publicité parue dans The Moving Picture World, vol 20, p 711.
- Directed by: Sidney Olcott
- Produced by: Sid Films
- Starring: Valentine Grant; Arthur Donaldson
- Distributed by: Warner's Features
- Release date: June 1914
- Running time: 3 reels
- Country: United States
- Languages: silent English intertitles

A Mother of Men is a 1914 American silent film produced by Sid Films and distributed by Warner's Features. It was directed by Sidney Olcott with Valentine Grant and Arthur Donaldson in the leading roles.

== Cast ==
- Valentine Grant -
- Arthur Donaldson -
- James Vincent -
- Walter Chapin -
- Roy Cheldon -
- Sidney Olcott -

== Production notes ==
A Mother of Men was shot in Jacksonville, Fla.
