= Bold Emmett Ireland's Martyr =

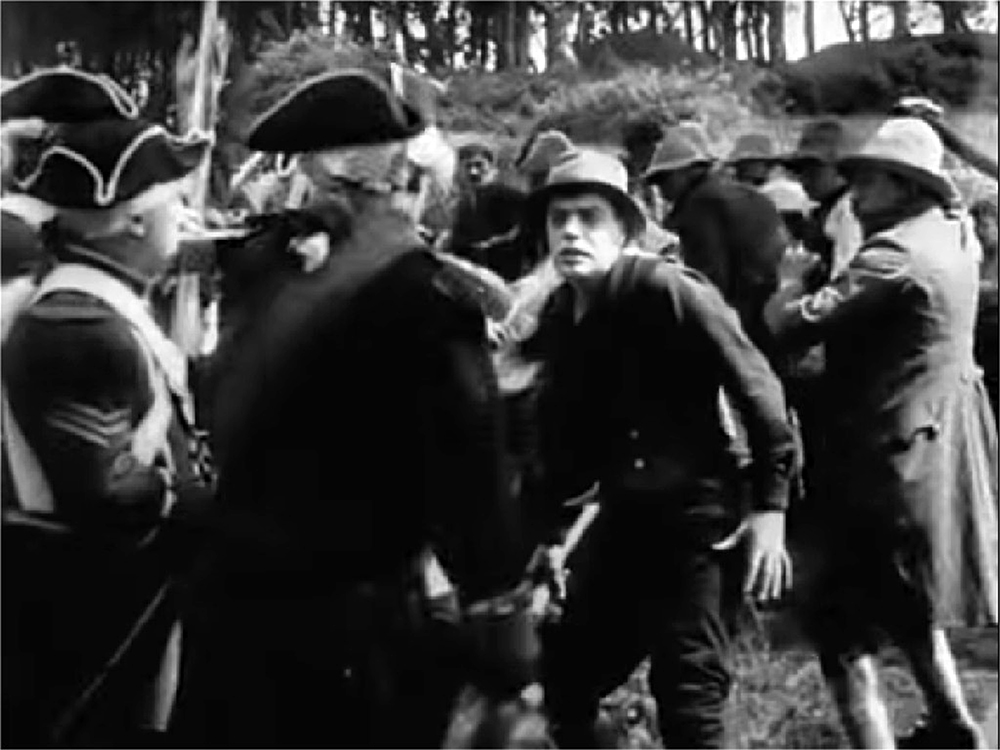
- Sidney Olcott
- Directed by: Sidney Olcott
- Written by: Sidney Olcott
- Produced by: Sid Films
- Starring: Valentine Grant; Sidney Olcott; PH O'Malley
- Distributed by: Lubin Manufacturing Company
- Release date: August 7, 1915
- Running time: 3 reels
- Country: United States
- Languages: Silent film (English intertitles)

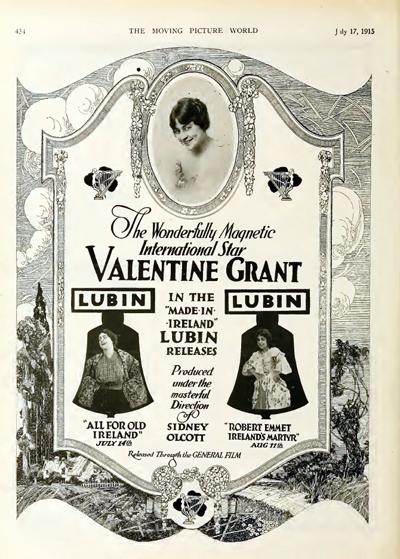
Advertising published by The Moving Picture World, July 17, 1915

Bold Emmett Ireland's Martyr is an American silent film produced by Sid Films and distributed by Lubin Manufacturing Company. It was directed by Sidney Olcott and played by Valentine Grant, Sidney Olcott and PH O'Malley in the leading roles. Shot in 1914 it was released in 1915. It is also known as All for Old Ireland.

== Cast ==
- Valentine Grant as Nora Doyle
- Sidney Olcott as Con Daly
- Laurene Santley as Mrs Doyle
- Jack Melville as Robert Emmett
- PH O'Malley as Major Kirk or Myles Murphy
- Robert Rivers as Feely, the informer
- Arthur G. Lee as Colonel Reid
- Charles McConnell as Father O'Flynn
- Jack Melville as Robert Emmett

== Production notes ==
The film was shot in Beaufort, County Kerry, in Ireland during summer 1914.
