= Slander (1916 film) =

1916 film by Will S. Davis

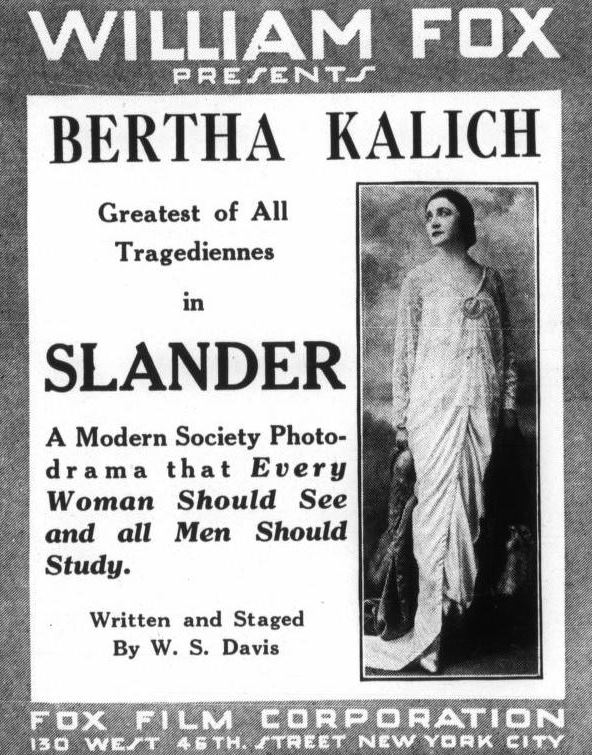
- Advertisement
- Directed by: Will S. Davis
- Written by: Will S. Davis
- Produced by: William Fox
- Starring: Bertha Kalich
- Cinematography: A. Lloyd Lewis
- Distributed by: Fox Film Corporation
- Release date: April 9, 1916
- Running time: 50 minutes
- Country: United States
- Language: Silent (English intertitles)

Slander is a lost 1916 American silent drama film starring Bertha Kalich. It was directed by Will S. Davis was produced and distributed by Fox Film Corporation.

== Cast ==
- Bertha Kalich as Helene Ayers
- Eugene Ormonde as Richard Tremaine
- Mayme Kelso as Tremaine's Wife
- Edward Van Sloan as Joseph Tremaine
- Robert Rendel as Harry Carson
- Warren Cook as Doctor
- Charles Peyton as Tremaine's Valet (credited as C. Peyton)
- T. Jerome Lawler as John Blair
