= Nan O' the Backwoods =

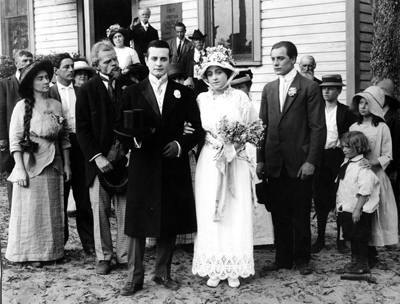
- James Vincent (left), Valentine Grant, Pat O'Malley
- Directed by: Sidney Olcott
- Written by: Edith Ellis Furness
- Produced by: Lubin Manufacturing Company
- Starring: Valentine Grant; Walter Chappen
- Distributed by: General Film Company
- Release date: November 14, 1915
- Running time: 3000 ft
- Country: United States
- Language: Silent (English intertitles)

Nan O' the Backwoods is a 1915 American silent film produced by Sid Films and distributed by Lubin Manufacturing Company. It was directed by Sidney Olcott with Valentine Grant and Walter Chappen in the leading roles.

== Cast ==
- Valentine Grant as Nan Peters
- Walter Chappen as Gilbert Martin
- James Vincent as Dr Brenton
- Pat O'Malley as Lige Peters (credited as P.H. O'Malley)
- Roy Sheldon as Nan's Father
