= Arda La Croix =

American actor

- Occupations: Stage actor; Screen actor; Author
- Spouse: 1916-1919

Arda La Croix was an American stage actor, screen actor, and author. He wrote novels based on popular plays including Billy the Kid.

La Croix appeared in several theatrical productions including with John Dillon Company. He was in the play In a Woman's Power in 1901.

Dorothy La Croix was his sister.

His movie roles included Courage for Two as Hubert (credited as Arda Lacroix) in 1919, The Grouch with Montagu Love and Dorothy Green in 1918 (as Curé), Chaupin in Her Silent Sacrifice in 1917, and Donald MacGregor in the 1916 film The Daughter of MacGregor.

He wrote a pulp fiction version of Billy the Kid published by J. S. Ogilvie Publishing Co. in 1907. He also wrote an adaptation of Joseph Stanley's play Lucky Jim and James Kyrle MacCurdy's Yankee Doodle Detective.

== Filmography ==
- Her Silent Sacrifice (1917)
- The Belgian (1917)
- Courage for Two (1919)
