= The Melting Pot (film) =

- Directed by: Oliver D. Bailey; James Vincent
- Written by: Oliver D. Bailey (co-scen.); Catherine Carr(co-scen.)
- Based on: The Melting Pot (play) by Israel Zangwill
- Produced by: Cort Film Corp; Gerald F. Bacon
- Distributed by: State's Rights
- Release date: May 30, 1915
- Running time: 5-6 reels
- Country: USA
- Language: Silent

The Melting Pot is a lost 1915 silent film drama based on the novel and 1909 Broadway play by Israel Zangwill. The film starred stage actor Walker Whiteside reprising his role from the Broadway play.

== Cast ==
- Walker Whiteside - David Quixano
- Valentine Grant - Vera Ravendal
- Flethcher Harvey - Baron Ravendal
- Henry Bergman - Mendel Quixano
- Julia Hurley - Frau Quixano
- Doc Crane - Quincy Davenport (as Harold
- Reginald Denny - unknown role (uncredited)
- Wheeler Oakman - unknown role (uncredited)
