= The Daughter of MacGregor =

1916 film by Sidney Olcott

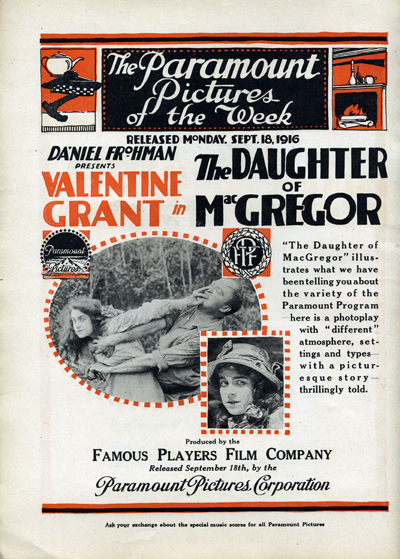
- Advertisement
- Directed by: Sidney Olcott
- Written by: Valentine Grant
- Produced by: Daniel Frohman; Famous Players Film Company
- Starring: Valentine Grant
- Cinematography: Al Liguori
- Distributed by: Paramount
- Release date: September 18, 1916
- Running time: 5 reels
- Country: United States
- Languages: silent English intertitles
- Budget: $ 25000

The Daughter of MacGregor is a 1916 American silent film produced by Famous Players Film Company and distributed by Paramount. It was directed by Sidney Olcott with Valentine Grant, his wife who wrote the scenario.

== Cast ==
- Valentine Grant - Jean MacGregor
- Sidney Mason - Winston, the English
- Arda La Croix - Donald MacGregor
- Helen Lindroth - Mrs McGrim
- Daniel Pennell - Bull Grogan
- Edwards Davis - Robert MacPherson
- Lady the Dog - Jean's companion

== Production notes ==
The film was shot in Florida and Canada. It used the working title "Jean O'the Heather".
