= Sydney Shields =

American actress (1888–1960)

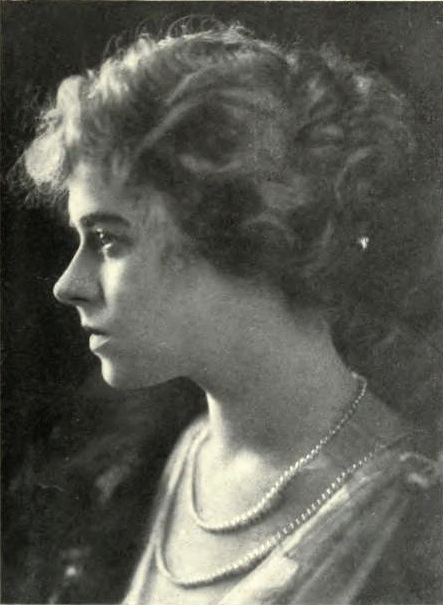
- Born: May 6, 1888; New Orleans, Louisiana, US
- Died: September 19, 1960 (aged 72); New York City, New York, US
- Occupation: Stage actress
- Height: 5’ 5”
- Spouses: Allen G. Miller; Edward H. Robins

Sydney Shields (May 6, 1888 – September 19, 1960) was an American stage actress active during the early decades of the twentieth century.

== Early years ==
Sydney Shields was born on May 6, 1888, in New Orleans, Louisiana, the first of five children to be raised by her parents, Bernard C. and Elizabeth "Bessie" M. (née Smallwood) Shields. Her father was an attorney and accountant who over his career served as a Louisiana State Legislator, New Orleans City Council member, director of New Orleans Public Schools and Assistant Secretary of the Board of Liquidation City Debt of New Orleans. Shield’s mother was one of the first female press agents in the United States and an accomplished actress who had performed with Minnie Maddern Fiske, Joe Haworth and Sydney Armstrong.

While she was a student at Hollins College, Shields acted in dramas and wrote one-act plays that the dramatic society performed. After she sent the plays to an agent in New York, some of them were used in vaudeville.

== Career ==
Shields first took to the stage as a young girl in vaudeville acts with her mother, two brothers and two sisters (Benn, Bernice, Santos and Sarah) performing for the Baldwin-Melville Company of New Orleans. When she was replaced by a younger sister after it became apparent she had grown too tall to play children’s roles like Little Lord Fauntleroy or Little Eva, Shields quit the stage and found work as a reporter for the New Orleans World. There she reported on stories big and small covering crimes, politics and the occasional fire. Shields also found the time to write a daily fairytale for the newspaper and pen a Sunday gossip column called "I Know a Girl". At some point she added theater critic to her resume writing reviews of plays and vaudeville shows playing in New Orleans.

Shields was enticed back onto the stage when she traveled to New York with a number of vaudeville skits she had written and hoped to sell. By 1910 she was touring vaudeville with her own company performing with actor/writer Allen G. Miller whom she married at some point. In 1913 she was picked to play a starring role in Reckless Age, produced by Cecil B. DeMille shortly before he made his move to film. Her New York stage debut came two years later in the failed play What Money Can’t Buy that could not buy an audience and closed after only eight performances. Over the next several seasons though, Shields would appear in such Broadway productions as The Fear Market (1916), If (1917), The Case of Lady Camber (1917) and Parlor, Bedroom and Bath (1917/18). In 1918 Shields joined the Over-There Theatre League that, in December of that year, became the first company of American actors to tour postwar Europe. Very early in her career Sydney appeared in at least two silent films and then apparently decided to remain on the stage.

After the war Shields appeared in another half dozen Broadway productions between 1922 and 1934. She was most likely best remembered by audiences of that period as Walker Whiteside's leading lady for seven seasons in road productions that toured the nation.

== Personal life and death ==
Shields' second husband was actor Edward H. Robins. Robins’ long acting career began in 1900 and lasted well into the 1930s before he chose to go into directing and working with the Actors' Equity Association. The couple married sometime after 1920.

Shields died on September 19, 1960, while a patient at Elmhurst Hospital in Queens, New York.
