= The Hidden Hand (serial) =

1917 film directed by James Vincent

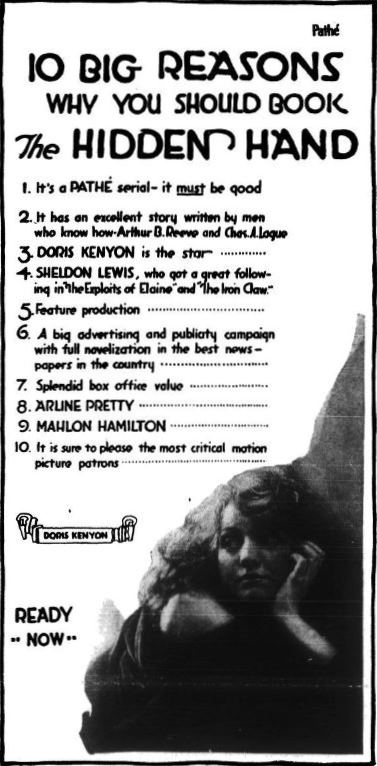
- Advertisement
- Directed by: James Vincent
- Written by: Charles W. Goddard; Arthur B. Reeve
- Produced by: Charles Pathé
- Starring: Doris Kenyon; Sheldon Lewis
- Distributed by: Pathé Exchange; Astra Films
- Release date: November 23, 1917
- Running time: 15 episodes
- Country: United States
- Language: Silent (English intertitles)

The Hidden Hand is a 1917 American film serial directed by James Vincent. This is a lost serial.

== Cast ==
- Doris Kenyon as Doris Whitney
- Sheldon Lewis as Dr. Scarley
- Mahlon Hamilton as Jack Ramsey
- Arline Pretty as Vera Orane
- Henry Sedley
- William Slade

== Chapter titles ==
1. The Gauntlet of Death
2. Counterfeit Faces
3. The Island of Dread
4. The False Locket
5. The Air-Lock
6. The Flower of Death
7. The Fire Trap
8. Slide for Life
9. Jets of Flame
10. Cogs of Death
11. Trapped by Treachery
12. Eyes in the Wall
13. Jaws of the Tiger
14. The Unmasking
15. The Girl of the Prophecy

== Reception ==
Like many American films of the time, The Hidden Hand was subject to cuts by city and state film censorship boards. For example, the Chicago Board of Censors required, in Chapter 1, a cut of a scene with an attack on a man by the Hidden Hand; in Chapter 2, of the Hidden Hand slugging a man; in Chapter 3, of a lighting meter, the loosening of a nut on a bolt, and the Hidden Hand killing a man; in Chapter 4, six scenes of cutting into safe with torch, gagging and binding young woman to chair, and taking jewel box from safe; in Chapter 5, Reel 1, the assault and abduction of young woman, assault on man, shooting poison powder at man, and examining property from unconscious man, Reel 2, two scenes of assault on man and young woman, two scenes of binding and gagging them, and shooting at the rope; in Chapter 6, the attack on the young woman, three scenes of finding and gagging her, four scenes of suspending her above lime box, and the intertitle "Fasten the rope so that when Ramsey comes she'll plunge into the box"; in Chapter 7, Reel 1, two scenes of young woman suspended over lime vat, throwing man into vat and following scene of him climbing out; in Chapter 9, Reel 1, two scenes of breaking in door of car, slugging of man, Reel 2, the Hidden Hand choking young woman, the intertitle "You will never interfere with my plans again", dynamiting tower and lighting fuse, attack on young woman, shorten fight scenes to eliminate holdup of hero with gun, striking man with shovel, and the young woman shooting man., in Reel 3, last scene of men and woman drinking at table, kissing woman on shoulder in automobile and all but the first and last struggle scenes, and two intertitles "You've left me alone" etc. and "Its your own game" etc.; in Chapter 10, Reel 2, a closeup of door locking on young woman, two scenes of attack on her, slugging man with rod, and the attack on the hero; in Chapter 11, Reel 2, threatening young woman with gun, throwing knife at man, two scenes of threatening young woman with dagger; in Chapter 12, Reel 1, two scenes of threatening young woman with knife, slugging man in fight scene, two views of note ending "You die in 24 hours", two scenes of threatening man with gun, tapping wires, and Reel 2, gagging and binding young woman; in Chapter 14, Reel 2, arrow sticking in man's face, lighting fuse, two additional scenes of arrow sticking in man's face (one with man standing and other in chair), and striking man on head with gun; and, in Chapter 15, Reel 1, shooting of man in automobile, shooting envoy in office, and, Reel 2, the intertitle "This tank of vitriol."

== See also ==
- List of lost films
