= The Innocent Lie =

1916 film by Sidney Olcott

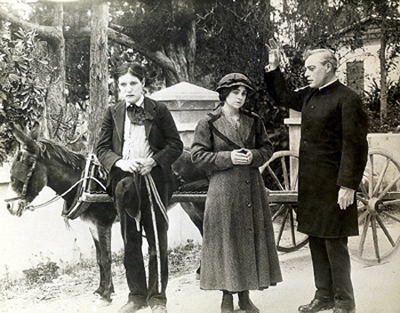
- Jack J. Clark (left) with Valentine Grant and Sidney Olcott
- Directed by: Sidney Olcott
- Screenplay by: Lois Zellner
- Story by: Hugh Ford
- Starring: Valentine Grant
- Cinematography: Al Liguori
- Production company: Famous Players Film Company
- Distributed by: Paramount
- Release date: May 8, 1916
- Running time: 5 reels
- Country: United States
- Language: Silent

The Innocent Lie is a 1916 American silent film produced by Famous Players Film Company and distributed by Paramount. It was directed by Sidney Olcott with Valentine Grant as leading woman.

== Cast ==
- Valentine Grant as Nora O'Brien
- Jack J. Clark as Terry O'Brien
- Morris Foster as Pat O'Brien
- Hunter Areden as Nora Owen
- Robert Cain as Captain Stewart
- Frank Losee
- William Courtleigh Jr.
- Helen Lindroth
- Charles Fergusson

== Production notes ==
The film was shot in Bermuda.
