= Her Silent Sacrifice =

1917 film

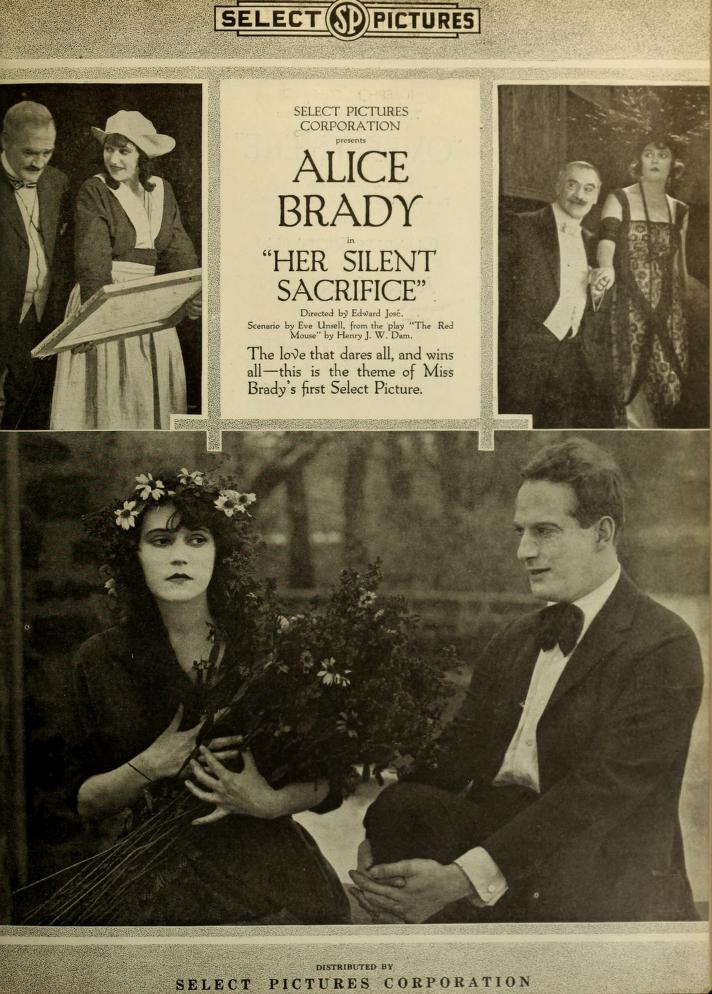
- Advertisement
- Directed by: Edward José
- Written by: Eve Unsell
- Based on: The Red Mouse by Henry J. W. Dam
- Produced by: Select Pictures
- Starring: Alice Brady
- Cinematography: Benjamin Struckman
- Distributed by: Select Pictures
- Release date: November 1917
- Running time: 5 reels
- Country: United States
- Language: Silent (English intertitles)

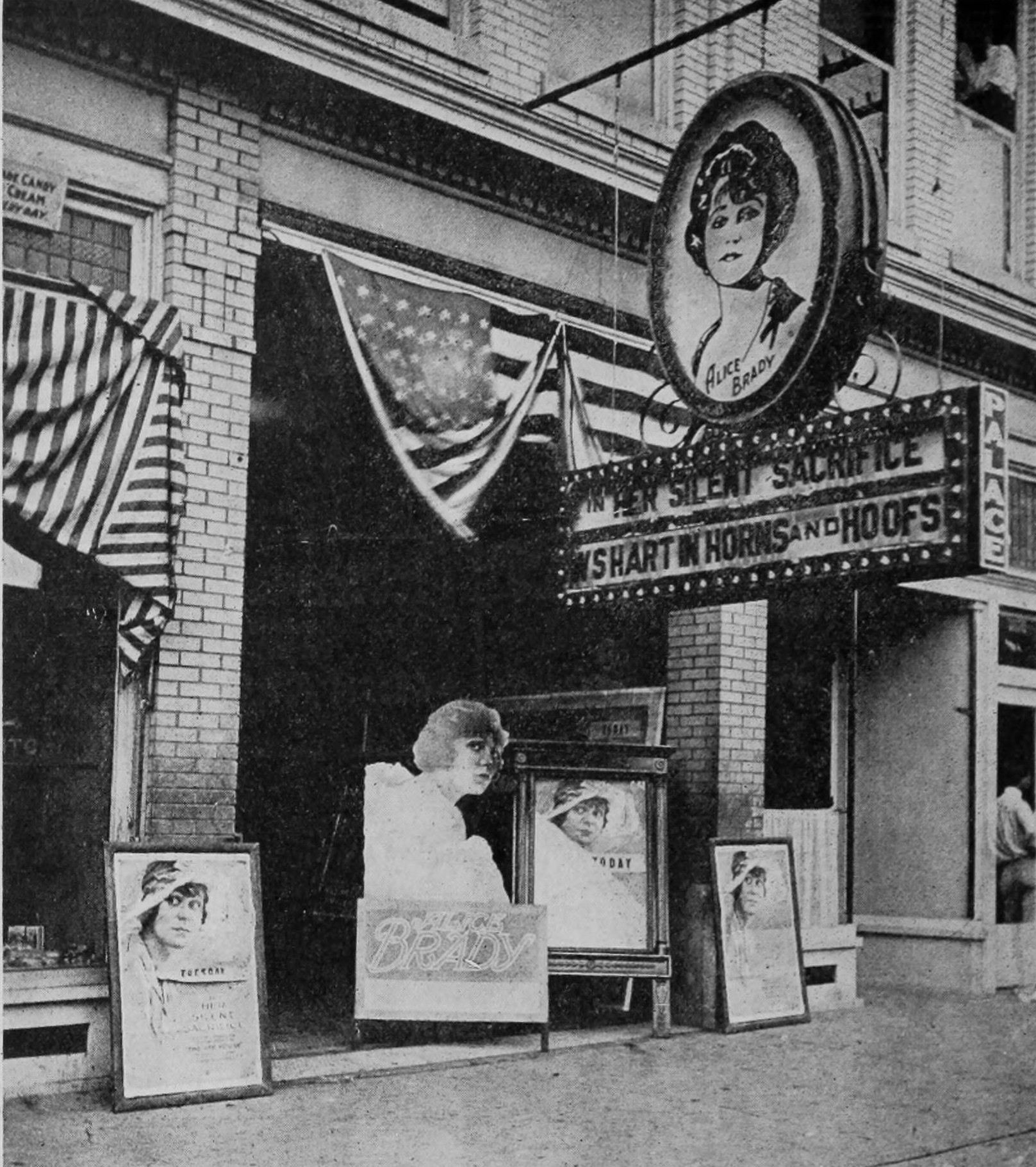
Contemporary theater showing the film, 1918

Her Silent Sacrifice is a 1917 American silent romantic drama film directed by Edward José and starring Alice Brady.

== Plot summary ==
In the quaint French village of Savenay, Arlette resides with her grandfather Chaupin, who owns the local inn. Richard Vale, a struggling young American painter, arrives in the village to create art and takes up residence at Chaupin's establishment. During his stay, he persuades Arlette to model for him, and she finds herself falling deeply in love with the financially-strapped artist.

When the affluent but licentious art aficionado Prince Boissard visits Savenay and becomes infatuated with Arlette, he offers Richard financial support in exchange for Arlette becoming his mistress. Arlette consents, and Boissard, pretending to be captivated by Richard's artistic talent, sponsors his trip to Italy for further studies.

A year elapses, and Richard comes back to Savenay, now an acclaimed artist. Boissard expects Arlette to fulfill her end of the bargain. Reluctantly, she agrees, but before anything can happen, Boissard's loyal servant Sarthe intervenes. Devoted to Arlette, Sarthe takes drastic action and stabs his master, effectively liberating Arlette and allowing her to marry the man she truly loves, Richard.

== Cast ==
- Alice Brady as Arlette
- Henry Clive as Richard Vale
- R. Payton Gib as Prince Boissard
- Edmund Pardo as Sarthe
- Blanche Craig as Countess Coralie
- Arda La Croix as Chaupin

== Preservation status ==
- The film is preserved in the Library of Congress, Packard Campus for Audio-Visual Conservation collection.
