= John A. Stevens =

American actor (died 1916)

John A. Stevens (c. 1844 – June 2, 1916) was an American playwright, actor, and theatre manager, best known for playing the title part in The Unknown.

== Biography ==
Stevens was born in Baltimore in about 1844. In 1865, he went on stage in Norfolk, Virginia, later becoming a manager there. He managed the Memphis Opera House in the early 1870s, and also the Coates Opera House in Kansas City, Missouri, from 1871 to 1873. He also started a "Great Western Star Circuit" to travel in western American cities. In 1879 he came to New York City, and took a lease on the Stadt Theatre, which he renamed the Windsor. After a fire destroyed that venue in 1883, he leased another theatre, but returned to the road when that did not succeed.

Among his plays were Passion's Slave, Wife for Wife, The Prairie Waif, and Daniel Boone. But his best-known play was The Unknown: A River Mystery, which he wrote for himself to star in. He debuted the piece in 1878, and played it for many years. According to an 1879 review in The Sun at the Globe Theatre, the play revolves around "a sailor who is sane for fifteen minutes at the opening of the piece and for fifteen minutes more at the close; but during the rest of the five acts is a raving maniac. He is all the while in search of his sister, who is hotly pursued by villains ..."

In 1880, he wrote The Prairie Waif for Buffalo Bill, receiving $4,000 for his work. According to Stevens, when he named a price of $5000 to Bill for writing the play, he claimed "Great Omaha! ... Why I never paid more than $500 for a play before." Stevens said he replied "But if you had paid $5,000 before perhaps you would not have needed a new play now."

== Personal ==
He was at one point married to actress Lottie Church, who performed in many of his productions. He married actress Emily Lytton (when he was 43 and she was 19) in 1887; they also later divorced. Stevens died in New York City on June 2, 1916, and was buried at Green Mount Cemetery in Baltimore.
