= Love and Hate (1916 film) =

1916 film by James Vincent

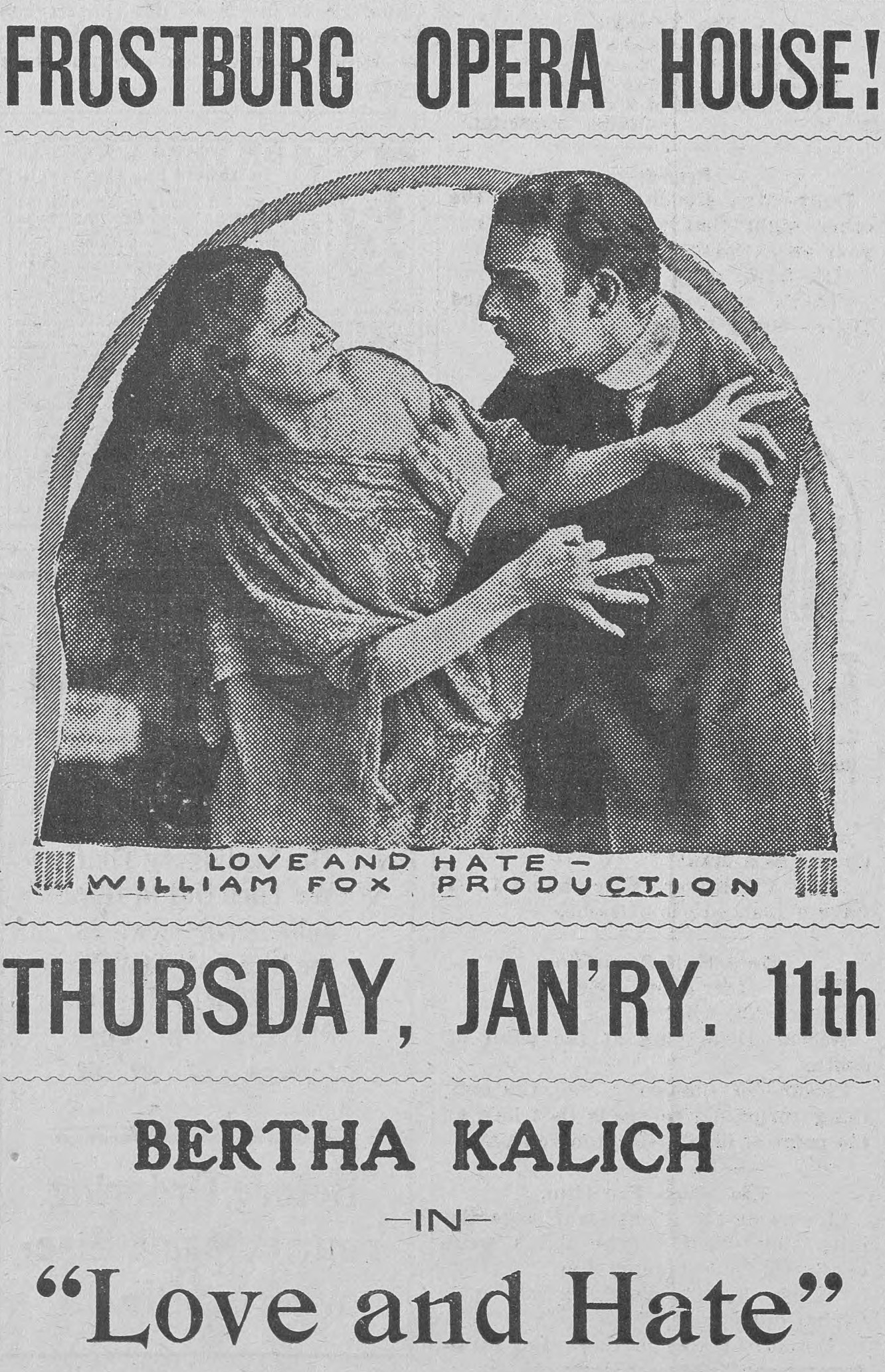
- Newspaper advertisement
- Directed by: James Vincent
- Written by: Mary Murillo (scenario); James R. Garey (story)
- Produced by: William Fox
- Starring: Bertha Kalich
- Cinematography: Rene Guissart
- Edited by: Alfred DeGaetano
- Distributed by: Fox Film Company
- Release date: November 1916
- Running time: 6 reels
- Country: USA
- Language: Silent.. English

Love and Hate is a lost 1916 American silent film directed by James Vincent and starring Bertha Kalich. It was produced and distributed by Fox Film Corporation.

== Cast ==
- Bertha Kalich - Helen Sterling
- Stuart Holmes - George Howard
- Kenneth Hunter - Robert Sterling
- Madeleine Le Nard - Rita Lawson
- Jane Lee - Willie Sterling
- Katherine Lee - Myrtle Sterling

== Preservation ==
With no holdings located in archives, Love and Hate is considered a lost film.

== See also ==
- 1937 Fox vault fire
