= The Day of Days (film) =

- Directed by: Daniel Frohman
- Based on: the novel, The Day of Days by Louis Joseph Vance
- Starring: Cyril Scott; Sadie Harris; David Wall; Arthur Donaldson; Leonard Grover
- Production company: Famous Players Film Company
- Distributed by: Paramount Pictures
- Release date: January 20, 1914
- Running time: 41 minutes
- Country: United States
- Language: English

The Day of Days is a lost 1914 American drama film directed by Daniel Frohman and written by Louis Joseph Vance. The film stars Cyril Scott, Sadie Harris, David Wall, Arthur Donaldson and Leonard Grover. The film was released on January 20, 1914, by Paramount Pictures.

== Cast ==
- Cyril Scott as Percival Subarite
- Sadie Harris as Marian Blessington
- David Wall as Bayard Shaynon
- Arthur Donaldson as Brian Shaynon
- Leonard Grover as George Bross
- Mabel Halsey as Violet
- Hal Clarendon as B. Penfield / Hajji, the beggar
- Anabel Dennison as Mrs. Inch
- Julia Walcott as Boardinghouse mistress
