= The Irish in America =

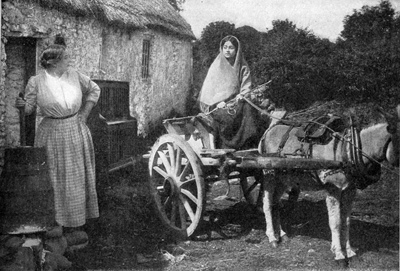
- Valentine Grant (right)
- Directed by: Sidney Olcott
- Written by: Sidney Olcott
- Produced by: Sid Films
- Starring: Valentine Grant; Sidney Olcott
- Distributed by: Lubin Manufacturing Company
- Release date: September 8, 1915
- Running time: 3 reels
- Country: United States
- Languages: Silent film (English intertitles)

The Irish in America is an American silent film produced by Sid Films and distributed by Lubin Manufacturing Company. It was directed by Sidney Olcott with him and Valentine Grant in the leading roles.

== Cast ==
- Valentine Grant - Peggy O'Sullivan
- Charles McConnell - Father O'Hara
- Sidney Olcott - Dan Murphy
- Laurene Santley - His Aunt
- Arthur Donaldson - Kerry Boy

== Production notes ==
The film was shot in Beaufort, County Kerry, Ireland, during summer 1914.
