= The Fishermaid of Ballydavid =

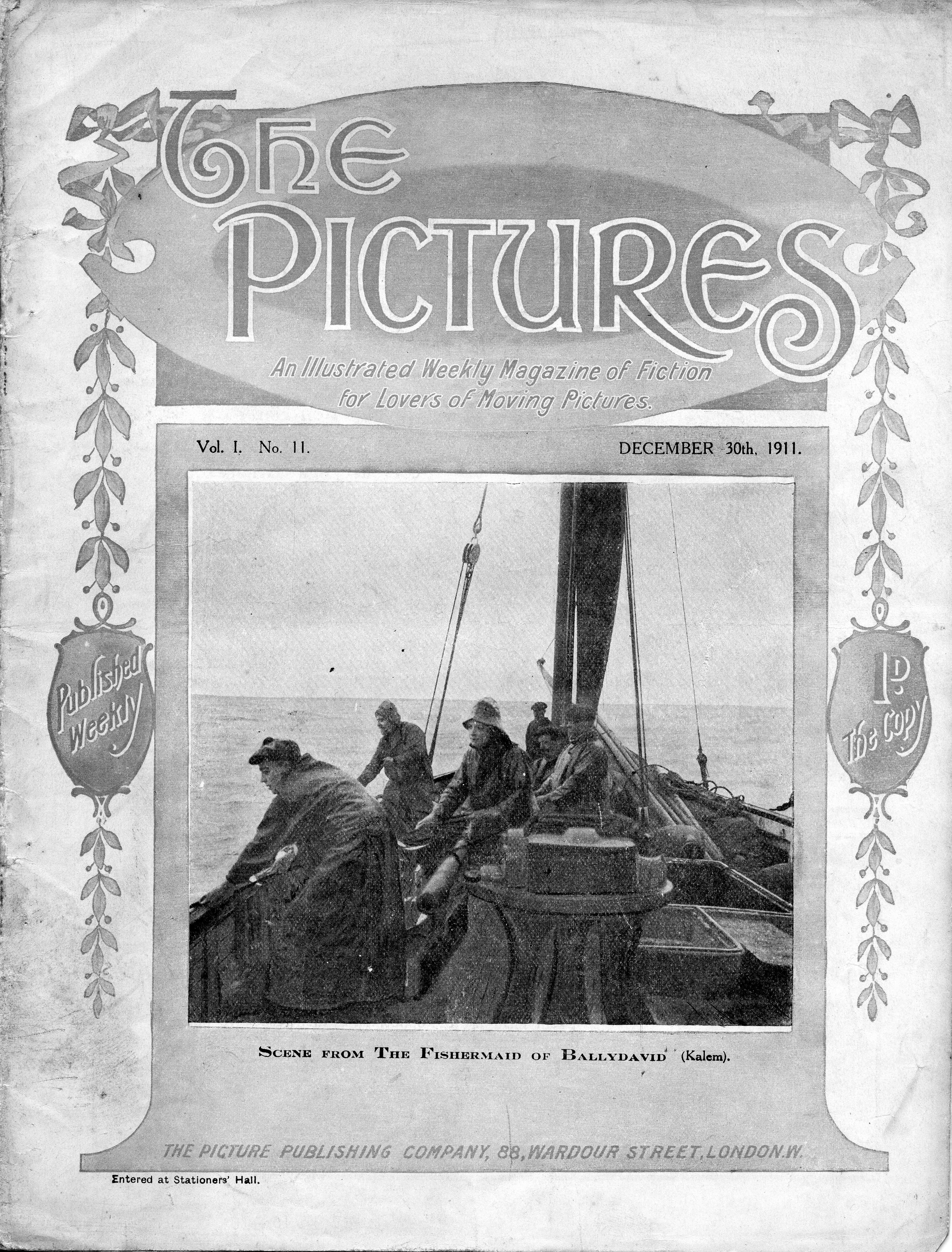
- The Pictures (Vol 1 n°11, December 31, 1911).
- Directed by: Sidney Olcott
- Written by: Gene Gauntier
- Produced by: Kalem Company
- Starring: Gene Gauntier; Sidney Olcott
- Cinematography: George K. Hollister
- Release date: November 17, 1911
- Running time: 1000 ft
- Country: United States
- Languages: Silent film (English intertitles)

The Fishermaid of Ballydavid is a 1911 American silent film produced by Kalem Company. It was directed by Sidney Olcott with himself and Gene Gauntier in the leading roles.

== Cast ==
- Gene Gauntier as Kathleen
- Sidney Olcott as Fisherman
- Arthur Donaldson as Kathleen's Father
- Jack J. Clark
- J.P. McGowan
- Alice Hollister
- Anna Clark

== Production notes ==
The film was shot in Ireland, in Ballydavid, County Kerry and in Howth, County Dublin, during summer 1911.
