= The Belgian =

1918 film

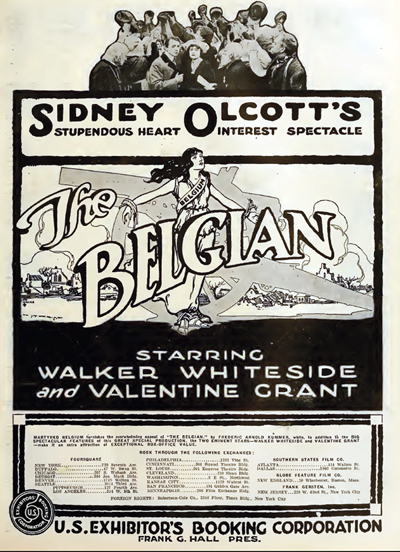
- Advertising published in The Moving Picture World, January 19, 1918
- Directed by: Sidney Olcott
- Written by: Frederic Arnold Kummer
- Produced by: Sidney Olcott
- Starring: Valentine Grant; Walker Whiteside
- Cinematography: George K. Hollister; Al Liguori
- Distributed by: Exhibitors' Booking Corp.
- Release date: January 10, 1918
- Running time: 7-10 reels
- Country: United States
- Language: Silent (English intertitles)

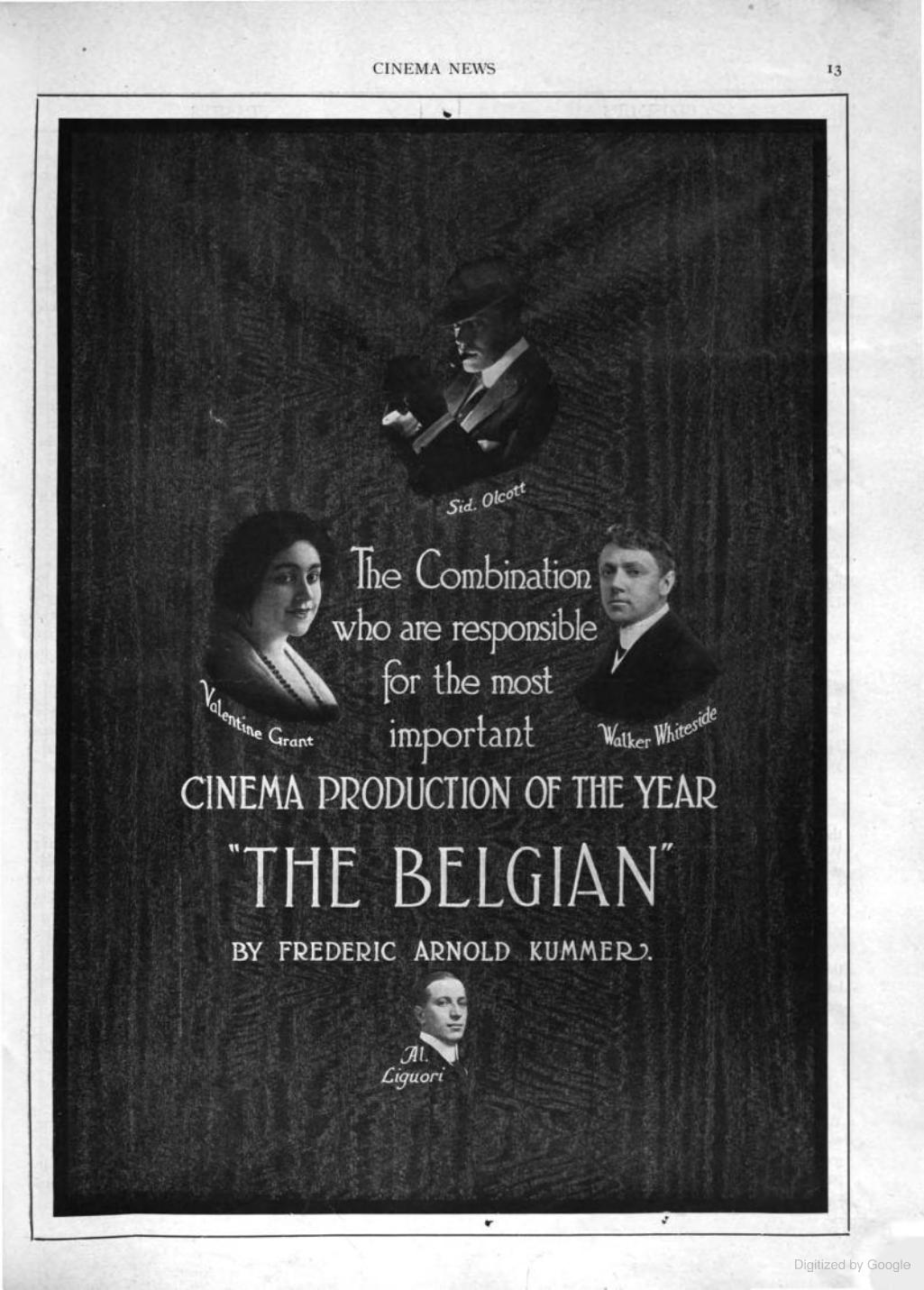
poster with images

The Belgian is a 1917 American silent film directed by Sidney Olcott and produced by Sidney Olcott Players with Valentine Grant and Walker Whiteside in the leading roles. It is not known whether the film currently survives.

== Plot ==
As described in a film magazine, two simple Belgian folk, Jeanne (Grant) and Victor (Whiteside), love each other. Victor is a gifted sculptor and is taken to Paris for training. There he meets Countess de Vries (Crute) and becomes infatuated. She is a German spy and meets many military men through him. Berger (Randolf), the postmaster in Belgium who is also a German spy, wants Jeanne for his wife. She resists him and goes to the church for protection. The machinations of the German secret service include every possible torment for those oppressed by their power, and when war is declared Jeanne would have suffered greatly had not Berger been killed when Victor was wounded. Jeanne nurses Victor back to health and over his heartbreak for the countess. True love returns, and together they work for Belgium and watch for the troops of a larger but not greater nation to come to their aid.

== Cast ==
- Walker Whiteside as Victor Morenne
- Valentine Grant as Jeanne Desfree
- Arda La Croix as Father Julian
- Sally Crute as Countess de Vries
- Georgio Majeroni as Colonel Dupin
- Anders Randolf as Berger
- Henry Leone as Jeanne's Uncle
- Blanche Davenport as Victor's Mother

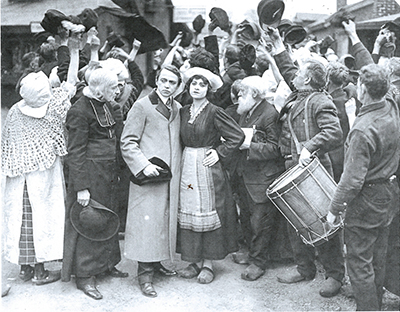
Walker Whiteside and Valentine Grant
