= The Ghost of Twisted Oaks =

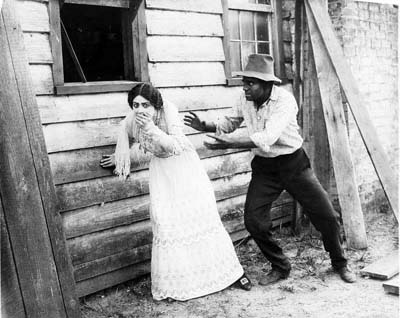
- Valentine Grant
- Directed by: Sidney Olcott
- Written by: Pearl Gaddis
- Produced by: Sid Films
- Starring: Valentine Grant; Florence Walcott; James Vincent
- Distributed by: Lubin Manufacturing Company
- Release date: November 11, 1915
- Running time: 3000 ft
- Country: United States
- Languages: Silent; English intertitles

The Ghost of Twisted Oaks is the American silent film produced by Sid Films and distributed by Lubin Manufacturing Company. It was directed by Sidney Olcott with Valentine Grant and Florence Walcott in leading roles.

== Cast ==
- Valentine Grant - Mary Randall
- Florence Walcott - Her Mother
- James Vincent - Jack Carlton
- Arthur Donaldson -

== Production notes ==
The film was shot in Jacksonville, Florida.
