= Ambition (1916 film) =

1916 film by James Vincent

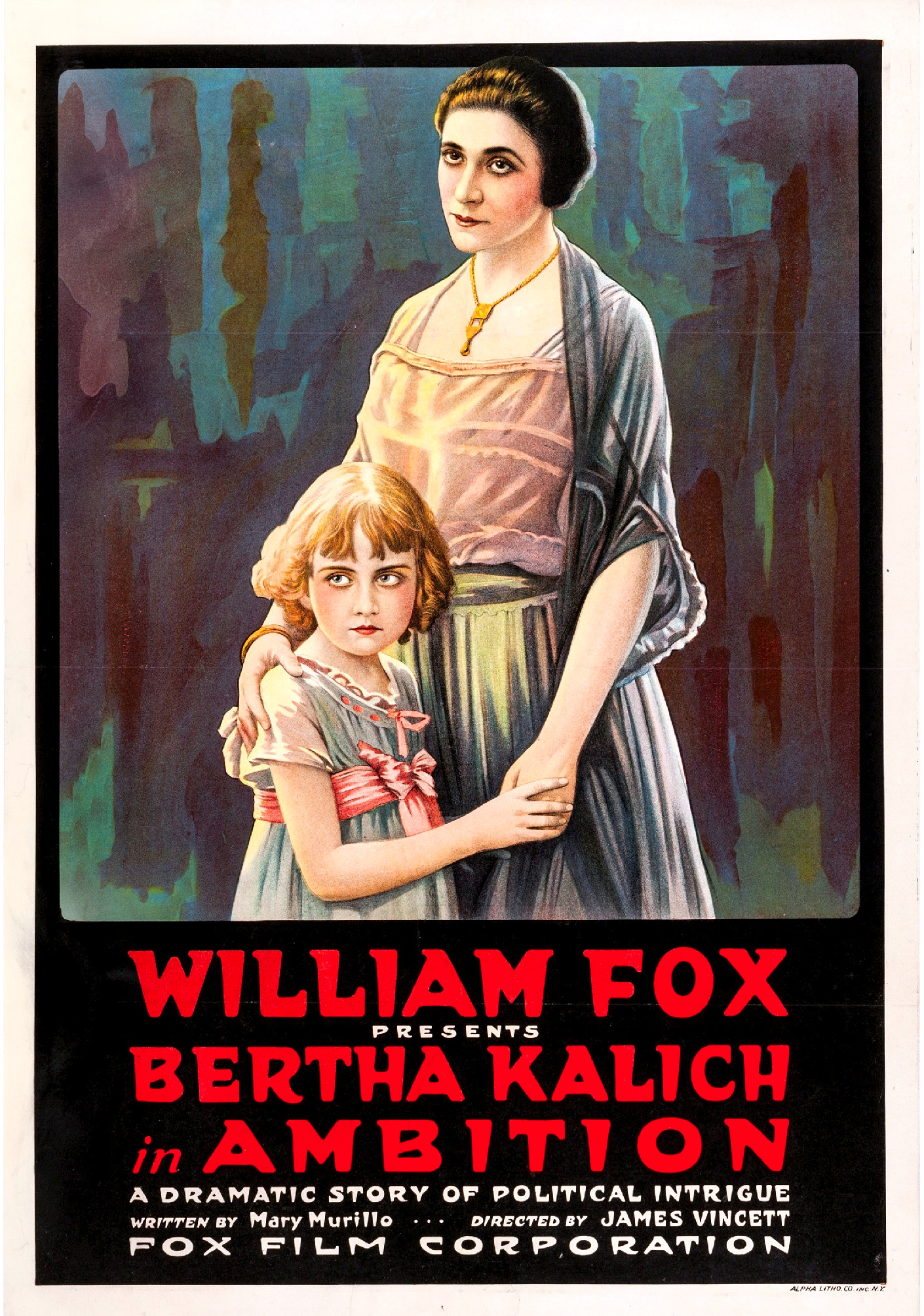
- Film poster
- Directed by: James Vincent
- Written by: Mary Murillo
- Produced by: William Fox
- Starring: Bertha Kalich
- Cinematography: Rene Guissart
- Distributed by: Fox Film Corporation
- Release date: June 25, 1916
- Running time: 50 minutes
- Country: United States
- Language: Silent (English intertitles)

Ambition is a lost 1916 American silent drama film directed by James Vincent and starring Yiddish theatre star Bertha Kalich. It was produced and distributed by the Fox Film Corporation.

== Cast ==
- Bertha Kalich as Marian Powers
- Kenneth Hunter as Robert Powers
- William H. Tooker as John Moore
- W. W. Black as James Grant
- Kittens Reichert as Betty Powers
- Gelbert Rooney
- Barnett Greenwood
- May Price
- Dan Crimmins
- Dorothy Phillips

== See also ==
- 1937 Fox vault fire
