= The Taint (film) =

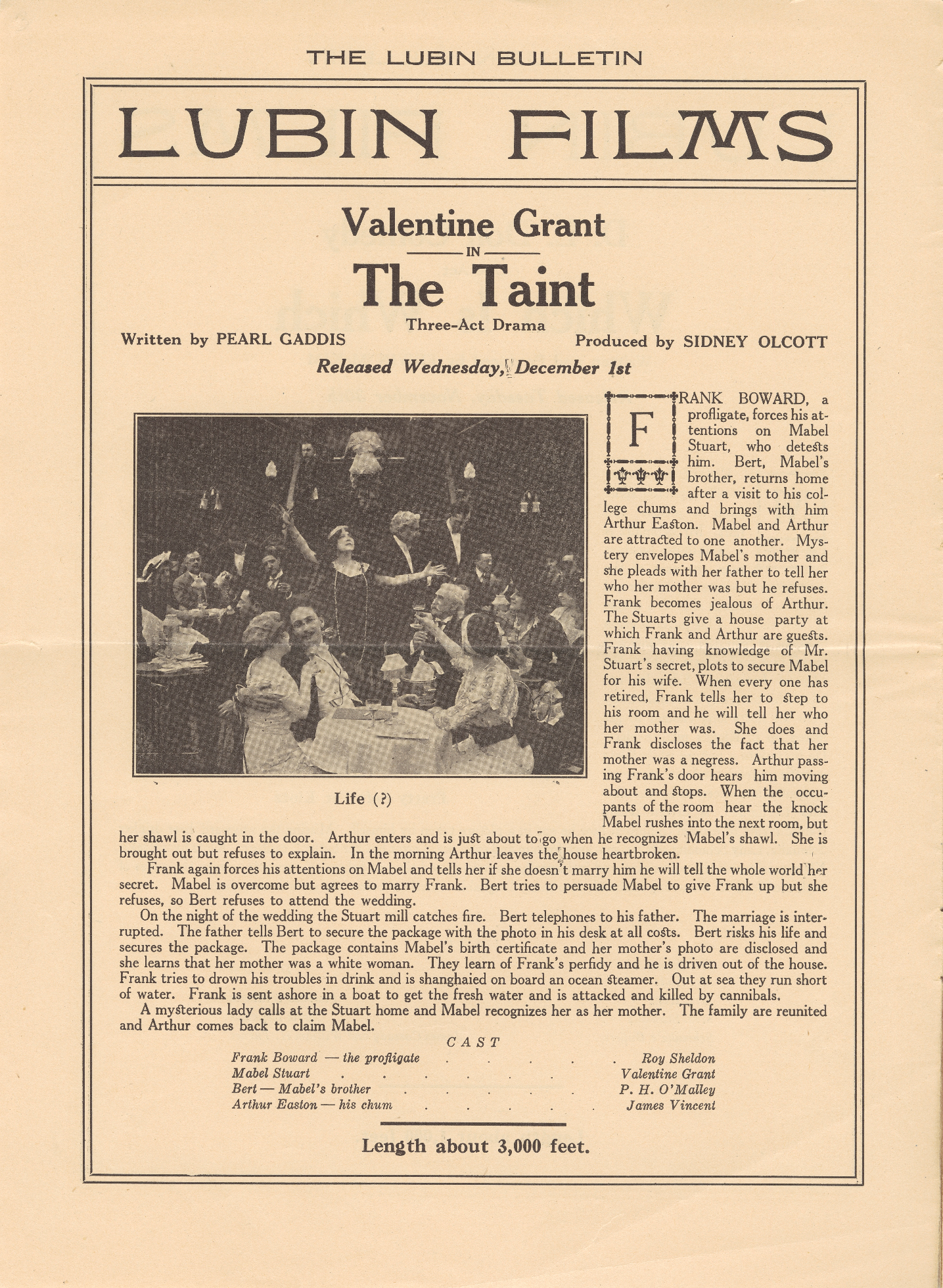
- The Lubin Bulletin (January 17, 1916)
- Directed by: Sidney Olcott
- Written by: Pearl Gaddis
- Produced by: Sid Films
- Starring: Valentine Grant; James Vincent; Pat O'Malley
- Distributed by: Lubin Manufacturing Company
- Release date: December 1, 1915
- Running time: 3000 ft
- Country: United States
- Languages: Silent film (English intertitles)

The Taint is an American silent film produced by Sid Films and distributed by Lubin Manufacturing Company. It was directed by Sidney Olcott with Valentine Grant, James Vincent and Pat O'Malley in the leading roles.

== Cast ==
- Valentine Grant - Mabel Stuart
- James Vincent - Arthur Easton
- Pat O'Malley - Bert Stuart
- Roy Sheldon - Frank Board
