= The Idle Rich (1914 film) =

1914 silent film by Sidney Olcott

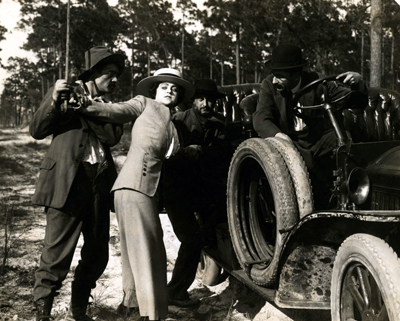
- Valentine Grant (right).
- Directed by: Sidney Olcott
- Produced by: Sid Films
- Starring: Valentine Grant; Arthur Donaldson; Sidney Olcott
- Distributed by: Warner's Features
- Release date: June 1914
- Running time: 3 reels
- Country: United States
- Language: Silent (English intertitles)

The Idle Rich is a 1914 American silent film produced by Sid Films and distributed by Warner's Features. It was directed by Sidney Olcott with Valentine Grant and Arthur Donaldson in the leading roles.

== Cast ==
- Valentine Grant
- Arthur Donaldson
- James Vincent
- Sidney Olcott

== Production notes ==
The film was shot in Florida.
