= James Vincent (director) =

American actor and director

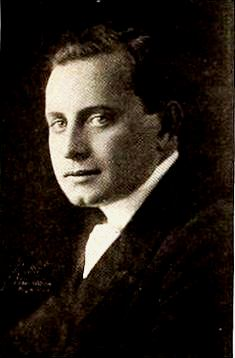
- Vincent in 1920
- Born: July 19, 1882; Springfield, Massachusetts
- Died: July 12, 1957 (aged 74); New York, New York
- Occupations: Actor; Film director
- Years active: 1910-1951

James Vincent (July 19, 1882 – July 12, 1957) was an American actor and film director of the silent era. He appeared in 23 films between 1910 and 1951, and directed 18 films from 1915 to 1931.

Born in Springfield, Massachusetts, Vincent studied drama and oratory before he became a leading man in stock theater productions. On Broadway, Vincent appeared in The Ragged Earl (1899), The Last of the Rohans (1899), From Broadway to the Bowery (1907), The Man Who Stood Still (1908), The Letter (1927), Insult (1930), Criminal at Large (1932), and Alien Corn (1933). He was stage manager for the Broadway plays The Age of Innocence (1928), Lucrece (1932), and Alien Corn (1933).

Film companies for which Vincent directed included Kalem, Sterling, Cort, and Pathe. He was president of the Motion Picture Directors Association in 1920. Immediately before he retired, he was a dialogue director.

Vincent died in Metropolitan Hospital in New York City on July 12, 1957, aged 74.

== Selected filmography ==
- The Pursuit of the Smugglers (1913)
- In the Hands of a Brute (1914) - Walter Roberts
- A Mother of Men (1914)
- The Idle Rich (1914)
- The Melting Pot (1915), only director
- Nan O' the Backwoods (1915)
- The Ghost of Twisted Oaks (1915) – Jack Carlton
- The Taint (1915) – Arthur Easton
- Gold and the Woman (1916)
- Ambition (1916)
- Love and Hate (1916)
- The Hidden Hand (1917)
- Love Aflame (1917)
- Wrath of Love (1917)
- Sister Against Sister (1917)
- Stolen Moments (1920)
