= Valentine Grant =

American actress (1881–1949)

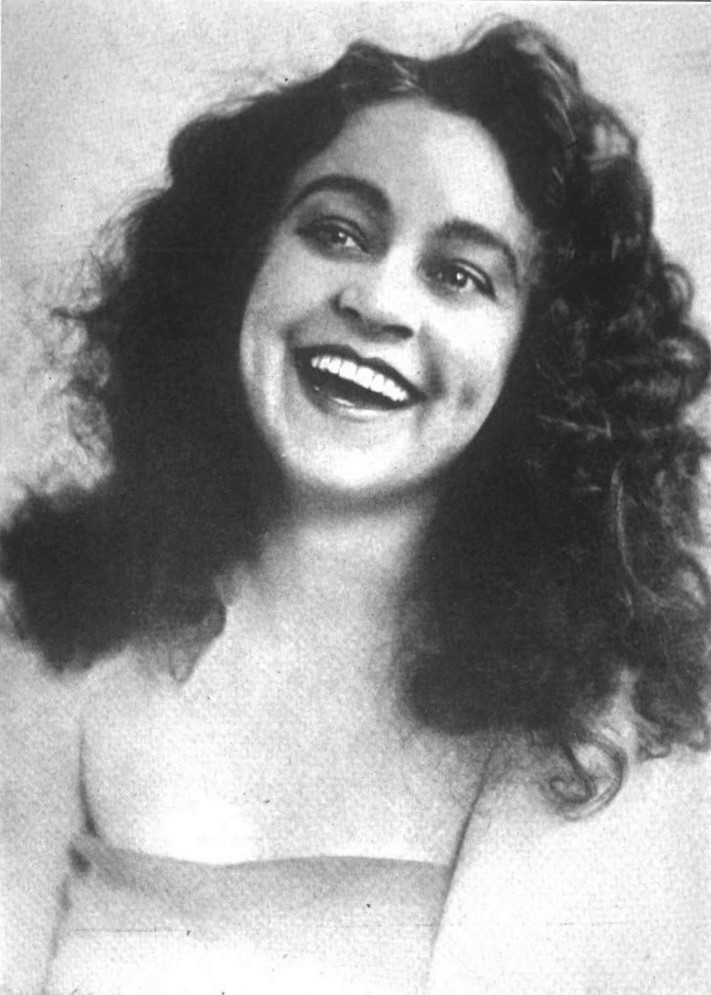
- Grant in 1916
- Born: February 14, 1881; Frankfort, Indiana, U.S.
- Died: March 12, 1949 (aged 68); Dana Point, California, U.S.
- Years active: 1914–1918
- Spouse: Sidney Olcott (m. 1914)

Valentine Grant (February 14, 1881 – March 12, 1949) was an American silent film actress.

== Biography ==
Grant was a singer who studied music in New York, hoping to sing grand opera. She performed musically on a tour of the western United States until health problems forced her to cease singing.

Grant became the companion of film director Sidney Olcott who cast her in his 1915 production of Nan O' the Backwoods. She had been part of the crew that went to film in Ireland. Films released in 1915 that she starred in include All For Old Ireland, Bold Emmett, Ireland's Martyr and The Irish in America.

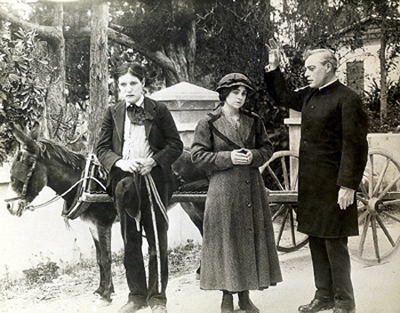
Valentine with Jack J. Clark (left) and Sidney Olcott in The Innocent Lie (1916)

Grant also appeared in several films for other companies such as Lubin Studios in Philadelphia and for Famous Players–Lasky. In 1914, she married Olcott, with whom she would remain for the rest of her life, and after he left Kalem she performed in a few films for his production company before retiring in 1918.

Grant died in 1949 a few months before her husband. She is buried in Cypress View Mausoleum and Crematory, San Diego, California.

== Filmography ==
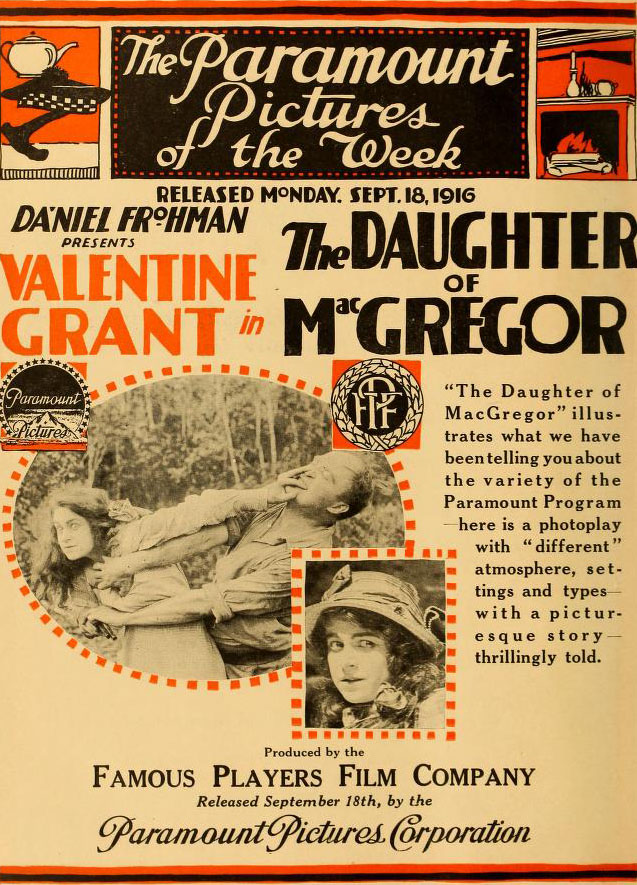
The Daughter of MacGregor (1916)

- When Men Would Kill (1914)
- In the Hands of a Brute (1914)
- A Mother of Men (1914)
- Tricking the Government (1914)
- The Idle Rich (1914)
- The Melting Pot (1915)
- Nan O' the Backwoods (1915)
- The Irish in America (1915)
- All For Old Ireland (1915)
- Bold Emmett Ireland's Martyr (1915)
- The Ghost of Twisted Oaks (1915)
- The Taint (1915)
- The Innocent Lie (1916)
- The Daughter of MacGregor (1916)
- The Belgian (1918)
