= Arthur Donaldson (actor) =

Swedish-American actor

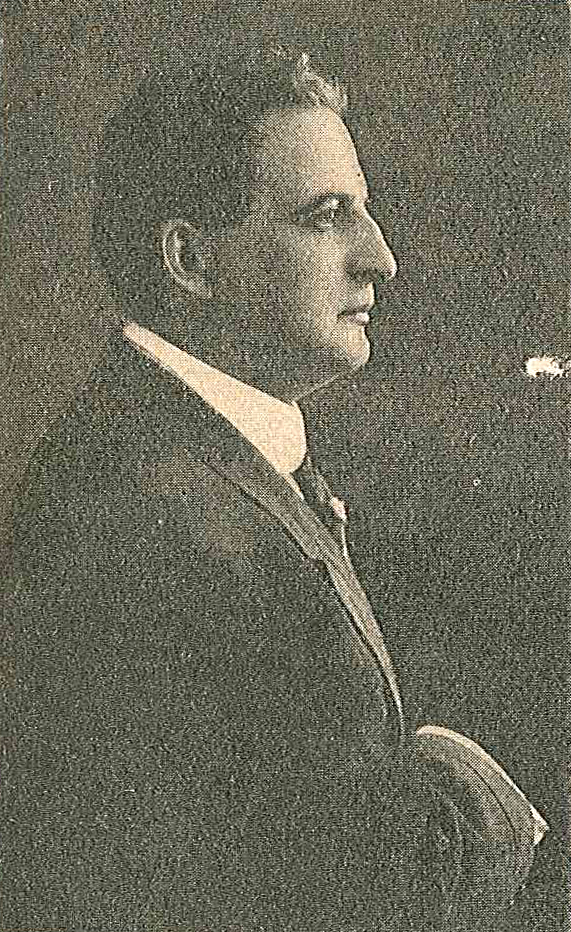
- Donaldson, c. 1911
- Born: 5 April 1869; Norsholm, Sweden
- Died: 28 September 1955 (aged 86); Long Island, New York, U.S.
- Occupation: Actor
- Spouse: Florence Walcott

Arthur Donaldson (5 April 1869 – 28 September 1955), was a Swedish-American actor and opera singer. He appeared in 71 films between 1910 and 1934.

== Biography ==
Donaldson was born in Norsholm, Sweden. His father was a sea captain, and his mother was an actress. He was educated at the Royal Academy of Dramatic Art in Stockholm. He moved to the United States at the age of 14 and quickly became a prolific actor on stage. He made his film debut in 1910.

Donaldson debuted on stage when he was seven years old, performing in Uncle Brown's Leather Couch at the Stora Theatre in Norrköping, Sweden. He first performed on stage in the United States in 1890 as part of a Swedish company. Donaldson moved from theatrical productions to singing, first with the Duff Opera Company and then performing in a concert tour with Emma Cecilia Thursby. He returned to acting in 1893, organizing a Swedish stock company in Brooklyn, New York. The troupe moved to Chicago in 1894. In 1903, Donaldson created the title role in The Prince of Pilsen with the Tivoli Opera Company in San Francisco. Donaldson sang the role for four consecutive seasons, a total of 1,345 performances.

He worked for Kalem Company under the direction of Sidney Olcott. During the summer of 1911, he went to Ireland with the O'Kalems, a stage company, to shoot films. They settled in Beaufort, County Kerry, where they made 13 films, directed by Olcott. Among them: Rory O'More, The Colleen Bawn in which he played a priest, The Fishermaid of Ballydavid, and Arrah-na-Pogue.

After Ireland, he returned briefly to Sweden, appearing in operettas at Oscarsteatern and making two Swedish films (one as director) before going back to America. He also directed Domen (1924), a Swedish-language short film, a version of Retribution, in the DeForest Phonofilm process.

Upon his return to the U.S., he worked again with Sidney Olcott in films such as A Mother of Men (1914), The Irish in America (1915), shot in 1914 in Ireland, The Moth and the Flame (1915), and The Ghost of Twisted Oaks (1915).

In the 1920s, Robert G. Vignola, became director for Cosmopolitan Productions. Donaldson played in When Knighthood Was in Flower (1922) and Yolanda, both with Marion Davies. He also acted in America, directed by D. W. Griffith.

Donaldson was married to Florence Walcott, a prima donna with the Metropolitan Opera and with the Aborn Grand Opera Company.

He died in a hospital in Long Island, New York, on 28 September 1955. He is buried at Kensico Cemetery.

== Partial filmography ==
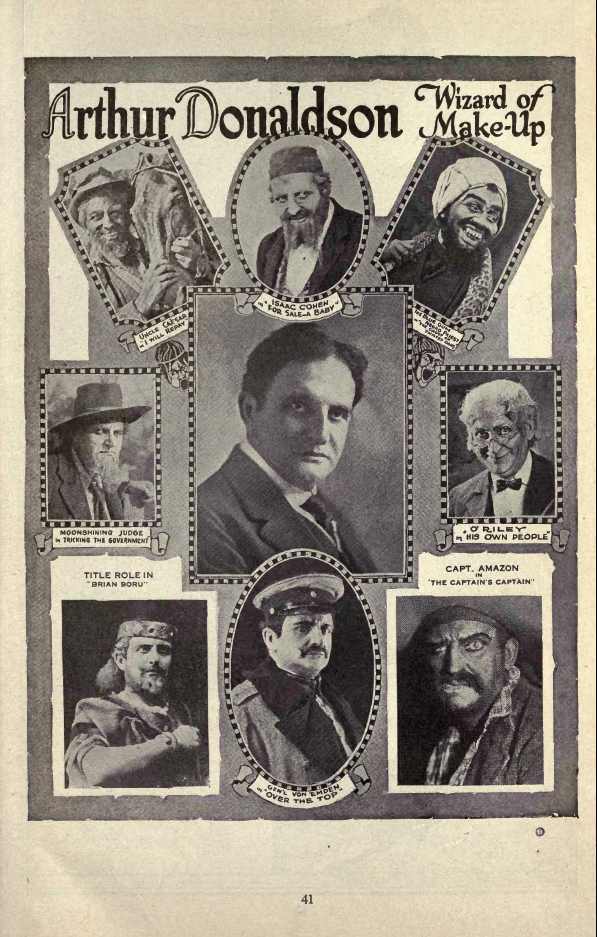
Arthur Donaldson, Wizard of Make-Up

- The Conspiracy of Pontiac – The Indian Chief
- A Lad from Old Ireland (1910) – The Priest
- Rory O'More (1911) – Father O'Brien
- The Colleen Bawn (1911) – Father Tom
- The Fishermaid of Ballydavid (1911) – Kathleen's father
- Arrah-na-Pogue (1911) – O'Grady
- The Atheist (1913) – A Clergyman
- The Day of Days (1914)
- A Mother of Men (1914)
- The Idle Rich (1914)
- Tricking the Government (1914)
- The Moth and the Flame (1915) – Mr Walton
- The Irish in America (1915) – Kerry Bay
- The Ghost of Twisted Oaks (1915) – The Snake charmer
- Enlighten Thy Daughter (1917)
- The Danger Trail (1917)
- His Own People (1917) – Shamus Reilly
- The Green God (1918)
- Over the Top (1918)
- The Golden Goal (1918)
- The A.B.C. of Love (1919)
- Atonement (1919)
- The Undercurrent (1919)
- A Modern Salome (1920)
- Is Life Worth Living? (1921)
- Gilded Lies (1921)
- The Rider of the King Log (1921)
- The Silver Lining (1921)
- The Passionate Pilgrim (1921)
- Find the Woman (1922)
- When Knighthood Was in Flower (1922)
- Yolanda (1924)
- America (1924)
- For Woman's Favor (1924)
- The Bandolero (1924)
- The Swan (1925)
- Fifty-Fifty (1925)
- Down Upon the Suwanee River (1925)
- Love 'Em and Leave 'Em (1926)
- Wives at Auction (1926)
- The Winning Oar (1927)
- The Broadway Drifter (1927)

== Sources ==
- Hvar 8 dag (Swedish illustrated weekly magazine), no. 52 1911
- Svensk filmdatabas (Swedish film database) at the website of the Swedish Film Institute
