= Hession =

Old Irish surname

Hession (pronounced "hesh + in") is an old Connacht Irish surname. It is an Anglicized form of the Irish Ó hOissín. In Irish, it is pronounced "O + hush + een".

It appears to originate in County Galway and in County Mayo. The Hession surname is predominantly found in these counties in the Census of Ireland, 1911. It denotes descent from a person named Oisín, a personal name meaning "little deer", and the name of the poet and warrior of the fianna in Irish mythology. Áed Ua hOissín was the name of two Irish clerics in the 11th and 12th centuries - the coarb of St. Jarlath (1050) and the first Archbishop of Tuam (1152) respectively. George Petrie who unearthed the High cross at Tuam which bears an inscription Áed Ua hOissín wrote that he was assisted by a gentleman of the name O'Heshin who little realised he was digging up the relic of an ancestor. Darby O'Hession (spelt O'Hoysshynne) is the name of a Galway Cleric in the 16th, a vicar choral recorded in that churches first charter of St. Nicholas' Collegiate Church in Galway in 1551.

Hession has occasionally been spelt Hessian in Galway and is sometimes falsely assumed to be of German origin - See Hessian. MacLysaght suggests a connection with the surname Ussher - which is probably the name of a separate and distinct family of English Origin based in Dublin and later in Galway. This connection with Ussher is apparently the basis for claims the family is of Norman or English Origin, and the use of the Ussher Arms for the family on popular family history sites.

The name may be related with similar names Hishon in County Limerick and Hassan in County Londonderry. Hishon is the anglicised form of Ó hOiseáin and finds an early reference amongst the Allies of the MacNamara family in County Clare in the early 14th century. While Hassan is the anglicized form of Ó hOsáin.

The Annals of Loch Ce record that Domnall Ua Cuirc king of Muscraige was killed by Ua Oisin and Ua Fladhen in 1044, while another Ua Oisin was involved in conflict between the men of Magh Ithe and the Airgíalla in 1055.

== People ==
- Áed Ua hOissín, first Archbishop of Tuam, died 1161
- Darby O'Hoysshyne Vicar choral of St. Nicholas' Collegiate Church - Royal Charter 1551
- Liam Ó hOisín, scribe and translator, fl. 1825-1871
- Roy Hession Evangelist, born London 1908
- Reverend Brian Hession Church of England Priest, pioneering religious film maker and early advocate against stigma in medicine, particularly cancer. 1909-1961.
- Annie Hession (Mrs Keane), Traditional Singer
- Mairead Ni hOisin, Traditional Singer and Teacher 1892-1978
- Maire Ni Oisin, Actress, An Comhar Dramaoichta 1900-1957
- James Hession, Fine Gael Teachta Dála, 1912–1999
- Carl Hession, Composer
- Paul Hession, Irish international track and field athlete, born 1983

== See also ==
- Hassan (surname)
- Hessian
