= Feature film =

Film with a long running time

A feature film or feature-length film (often abbreviated to feature) is, broadly, a film (motion picture, "movie" or simply "picture") with a running time long enough to be considered the principal or sole presentation in a commercial entertainment theatrical program. More strictly, the term as used in the film industry refers to a feature-length fictional work of entertainment, comparable to a novel, its parts enacted by actors on sets following a script under the guidance of a director, as opposed to a documentary film, which treats real events factually. Feature films generally employ a storyline, a characteristic frequently shared by documentaries. With the rise of major OTT services, feature films are also premiering on streaming platforms instead of movie theaters.

The term feature film originally referred to the main, full-length film in a cinema program that included a short film and often a newsreel. Matinée programs, especially in the United States and Canada, in general, also included cartoons, at least one weekly serial, and, typically, a second feature-length film on weekends.

The first narrative feature film was the 70-minute The Story of the Kelly Gang (1906). Other early feature films include Defence of Sevastopol (1911), From the Manger to the Cross (1912), Raja Harishchandra (1913), Quo Vadis? (1913), Cabiria (1914), and The Birth of a Nation (1915).

== Description ==
The notion of how long a feature film should be has varied according to time and place. According to the Academy of Motion Picture Arts and Sciences, the American Film Institute, and the British Film Institute, a feature length film runs for more than 40 minutes. SAG-AFTRA states that a feature's running time is 60 minutes or longer.

The Centre National de la Cinématographie in France defines a feature film as a 35 mm film longer than 1,600 metres (5,200 ft), which is exactly 58 minutes and 29 seconds for sound films. Germany defines it as one that is at least 79 minutes long. In India, the Central Board of Film Certification (CBFC) officially defines a 'long film' as any film running 72 minutes or more.

In 1959, the British Films Fund Agency defined a short film as having less than 3,000 ft (approx. 34 minutes); consequently, anything longer was feature-length.

== History ==
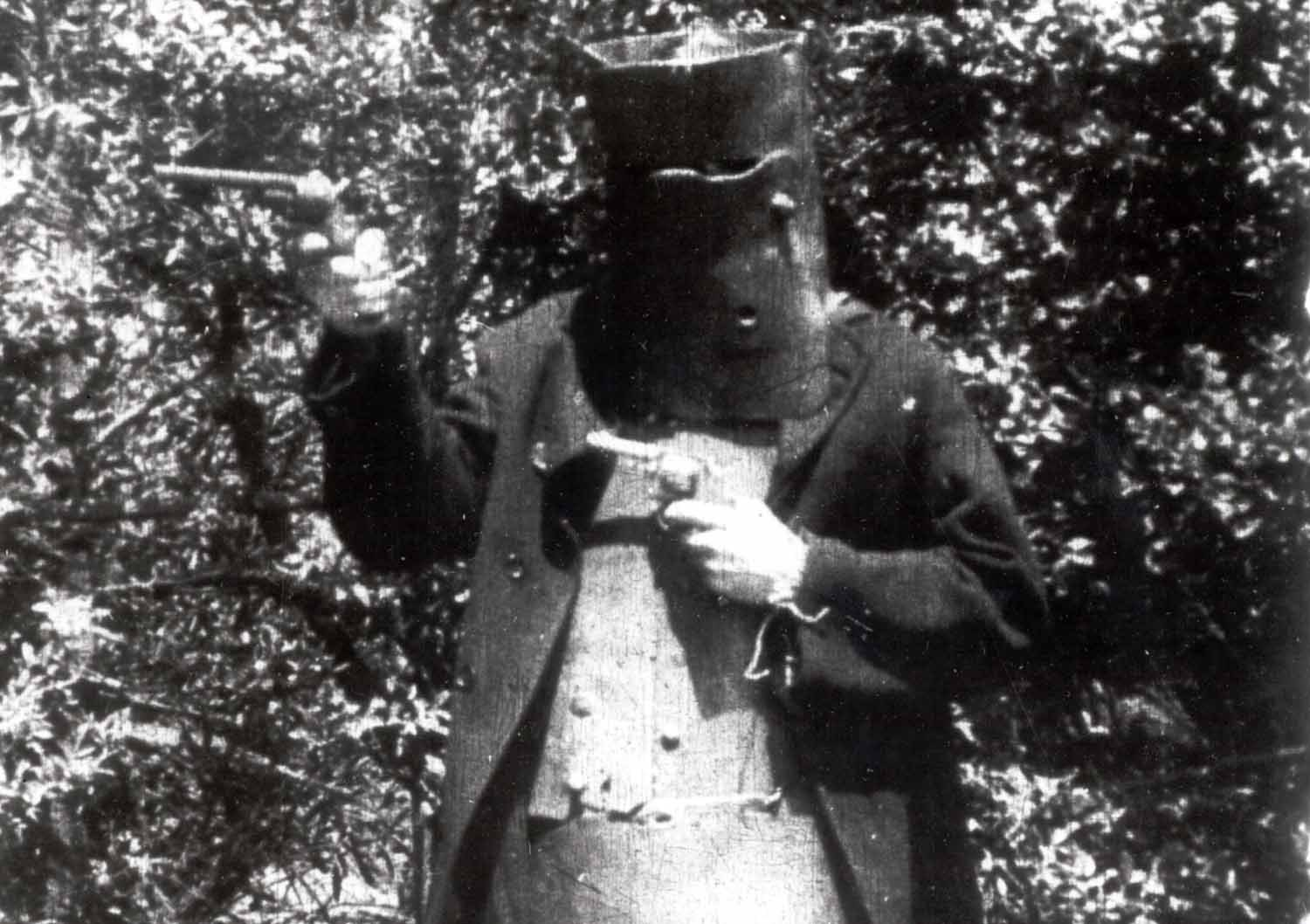
An actor playing the Australian bushranger Ned Kelly in The Story of the Kelly Gang (1906), the world's first dramatic feature-length film

The term feature film came into use to refer to the main film presented in a cinema and the one which was promoted or advertised. The term was used to distinguish the longer film from the short films (referred to as shorts) typically presented before the main film, such as newsreels, serials, animated cartoons, live-action comedies and documentaries. There was no sudden increase in the running times of films to the present-day definitions of feature-length; the "featured" film on a film program in the early 1910s gradually expanded from two to three to four reels. Early features had been produced in the United States and France, but were released in individual (short film) scenes. This left exhibitors the option of playing them alone, to view an incomplete combination of some films, or to run them all together as a short film series.

This piecemeal approach reflected the economics of the nickelodeon era. Film exchanges and exhibitors, more than producers, resisted longer films: a program of several shorts offered variety, and one weak title could be offset by a stronger one, whereas a poor feature could ruin an entire show. Pathé's Drink (1909), which ran to about 2,100 feet, was issued one reel per week because exchanges would not accept it whole. The Vitagraph Company of America used the same method for its four-reel Les Misérables, released in parts between September and November 1909, and for its five-reel The Life of Moses, released between December 1909 and February 1910. The Life of Moses was also shown complete in 1910; the Shubert Theater in New Orleans ran it in full for eight days that April.

The structure of the American industry also favored short films. The Motion Picture Patents Company, the trust formed in 1908 by the leading American and French producers, limited its members' films to one and two reels, or roughly 10 to 20 minutes. Its distribution arm, the General Film Company, did not launch a dedicated Special Feature Service until May 1912, beginning with Selig's three-reel The Coming of Columbus. By November 1912 the licensed companies were releasing about two multi-reel features a week alongside 42 single-reel subjects.

Because the exchange system was built around short subjects, many early features were distributed outside it. Some were road-shown like touring plays, booked into opera houses, town halls and legitimate theaters at higher admission prices before worn prints passed to the nickelodeons. Others were sold through the "states rights" system, under which an individual or small company bought the exclusive right to exhibit a film within a set territory. The Italian five-reel L'Inferno (1911) was marketed in the United States this way, with exclusive rights offered state by state, and Adolph Zukor distributed the Sarah Bernhardt vehicle Queen Elizabeth (1912) on a states rights basis after its American premiere at the Lyceum Theatre in New York on 12 July 1912. It was the first release of Zukor's Famous Players Film Company. In 1913 George Kleine opened the eight-reel Italian epic Quo Vadis? at the Astor Theatre on Broadway on 21 April; The Moving Picture World described it as the first big dramatic film to open for a run in a first-class New York theater.

In 1914 W. W. Hodkinson organized Paramount Pictures Corporation as a distribution company for Famous Players, the Jesse L. Lasky Feature Play Company, Bosworth, Inc. and other producers. In the release charts printed in The Moving Picture World in December 1914, General Film listed 122 one-reel, 33 two-reel, one three-reel and two four-reel titles, whereas Paramount listed twenty five-reel and ten four-reel titles. Even so, one- and two-reel films still made up most regular programs at the end of 1914.

Early features were mostly documentary-style films of noteworthy events. Some of the earliest feature-length productions were films of boxing matches, such as The Corbett-Fitzsimmons Fight (1897), Reproduction of the Corbett-Jeffries Fight and The Jeffries-Sharkey Fight (1899). Some consider the 100-minute The Corbett-Fitzsimmons Fight to be the first documentary feature film, but it is more accurately characterized as a sports program as it included the full unedited boxing match. In 1900, the documentary film Army Life was produced by Robert Paul. It was a programme of 33 short films, with a total running time of around 75 minutes, following the training of British soldiers. Inauguration of the Australian Commonwealth (1901) ran for 35 minutes, "six times longer than any previous Australian film", and has been called "possibly the first feature-length documentary made in Australia". American company S. Lubin released a Passion Play titled Lubin's Passion Play in January 1903 in 31 parts, totaling about 60 minutes. The French company Pathé Frères released a different Passion Play in May 1903, The Life and Passion of Jesus Christ, in 32 parts, totaling 44 minutes.

Defined by length, the first dramatic feature film was the Australian 70-minute film The Story of the Kelly Gang (1906). Similarly, the first European feature was the 90-minute film L'Enfant prodigue (France, 1907), although that was an unmodified record of a stage play; Europe's first feature adapted directly for the screen, Les Misérables, came from France in 1909. The first Russian feature was Defence of Sevastopol in 1911. Early Italian features included L'Inferno (1911), Quo Vadis?, The Last Days of Pompeii (1913) and Cabiria (1914). The first UK features were the documentary With Our King and Queen Through India (1912), filmed in Kinemacolor and Oliver Twist (also 1912). The first American features were Oliver Twist, From the Manger to the Cross, Cleopatra and Richard III (all 1912). Actor Frederick Warde starred in some of these adaptations. The first Asian feature was Japan's The Life Story of Tasuke Shiobara (1912), the first Indian feature was Raja Harishchandra (1913), China's first feature film was Zhang Shichuan's Nan Fu Nan Qi (1913), the first South American feature was Brazil's O Crime dos Banhados (1913), and the first African feature was South Africa's De Voortrekkers (1916).

By 1915, over 600 feature films were produced annually in the United States. It is often incorrectly cited that The Birth of a Nation (1915) was the first American feature film. The most prolific year of U.S. feature production was 1921, with 682 releases; the lowest number of releases was in 1963, with 213. Between 1922 and 1970, the U.S. and Japan alternated as leaders in the quantity of feature film production. Since 1971, the country with the highest feature output has been India, which produces a thousand films in more than twelve Indian languages each year.

== Technological developments ==
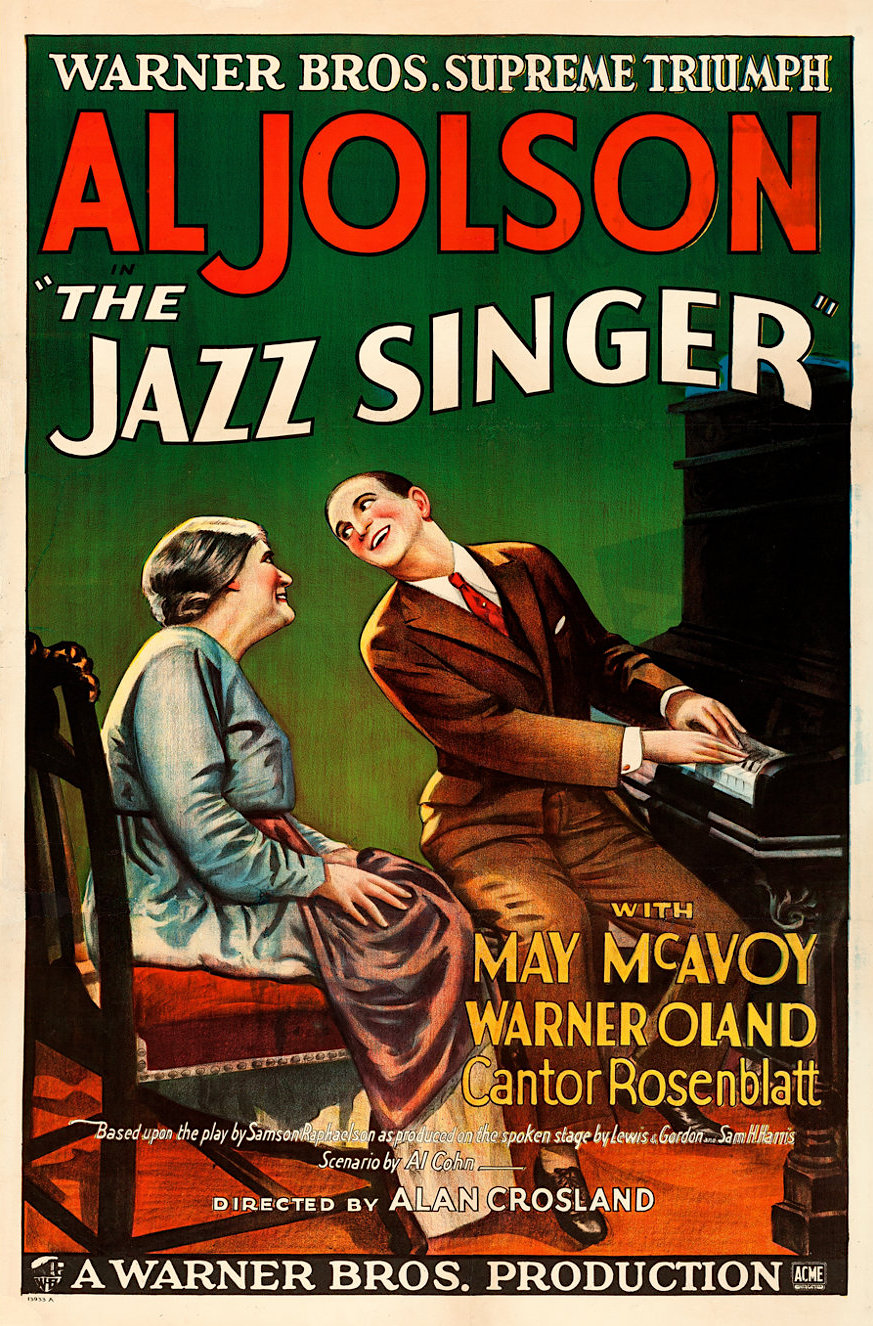
A poster for The Jazz Singer (1927), the first feature film to use recorded sound

In 1927, Warner Bros. released the first feature-length film with sound, The Jazz Singer (89 minutes), with an audio track recorded using a proprietary technology called Vitaphone. The film's success persuaded other studios to go to the considerable expense of adding microphones and various audio recording technologies to their sets, and scramble to start producing their own "talkies". Another early talkie titled Till the Bells Ring (45 minutes), which was first released in 1926 and rediscovered in 2026, used Phonofilm sound technology.

One of the next major advancements made in movie production was color film. Even before color was a possibility in movies, early film makers were interested in how color could enhance their stories. Early techniques included hand tinting: painting each frame by hand. Cheaper and more widely used was toning: dying the film in a single color, used in many films in the 1920s. The film processing lab Technicolor developed the Three-Tone coloring technique that became the standard for color film. It was a complex, time consuming, and expensive process that many movie studios were not eager to try. One of the early adopters of the three-strip process was Disney. Some of the most notable films Technicolor processed with three-strip were The Wizard of Oz and Gone with the Wind.

Following World War 2, further advances were made in color film. The introduction of Kodak's relatively inexpensive high-quality Eastmancolor single-print film in 1950 allowed studios to make prints easier than with Technicolor's more expensive three strip design. This ended Technicolor's monopoly and made the color process more accessible. Early notable films that used Eastmancolor were Royal Journey in 1951 and Carson City in 1952.

At the same time, the rise of televisions in the late 1940s and early 1950s posed a significant threat to the film industry. People were no longer going to movie theaters, so studios decided to add better visuals and sound that television could not replicate yet. This led to the adoption of widescreen formats such as Cinerama (1952), CinemaScope (1953), and VistaVision (1954), which offered bigger aspect ratios and a much more immersive viewing experience. Advances in sound technology, including stereophonic and multi-channel magnetic soundtracks further encouraged people to go to movie theaters, rather than stay at home and view their mono-channel home television, although only about 25% of movie theaters actually implemented full stereo audio due to high costs.

Digital Video (or DV) has quickly changed how most films are made. First used to create special effects and animated movies, digital cameras became more common on film sets in the late 1990s. In 2002, George Lucas' Star Wars: Episode II – Attack of the Clones became the first major studio film shot primarily on digital video. The ability to instantly play back footage and quickly transfer footage to computers for editing helped to speed up post-production time. Digital film making was given a big boost in 2005 when the Digital Cinema Initiative created a guide for manufacturers to create a universal standard, to make the technologies more compatible with each other and more user friendly. Shooting movies on digital also led to new technologies for distributing films. Titan A.E., released in 2000, was the first feature film to be released for viewing over the internet. Digital distribution changed the ways people received and watched media. It also gave viewers access to huge amounts of online content on demand.

== See also ==
- Narrative film
- Short film
- Featurette
- List of early color feature films
- List of motion picture terminology
- Television show
- Movie theaters
