= Strathtyrum =

Country estate in Scotland

Coordinates: 56.344796°N 2.826494°W

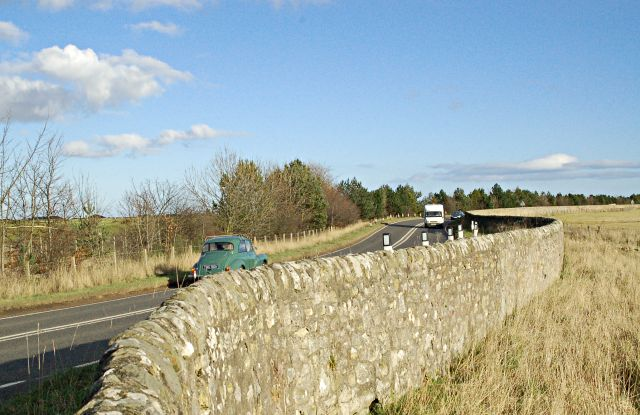
A91 road along the estate's northern boundary

Strathtyrum is a 400-acre (160 ha) country estate in the north-western outskirts of St Andrews, Fife, Scotland. It is accessed via the A91.

== Etymology ==
The name Strathtyrum was recorded as Trestirum in 1190, and may rooted in either a Gaelic or Pictish etymology. The first element is either Gaelic treabh or Pictish *trev, cognates both meaning "farm, estate, town" (cf. Welsh tref), assimilated to Gaelic srath, "valley". The second element is possibly Gaelic tioram, "dry", or else an adaptation or translation of an earlier Pictish form.

== History ==
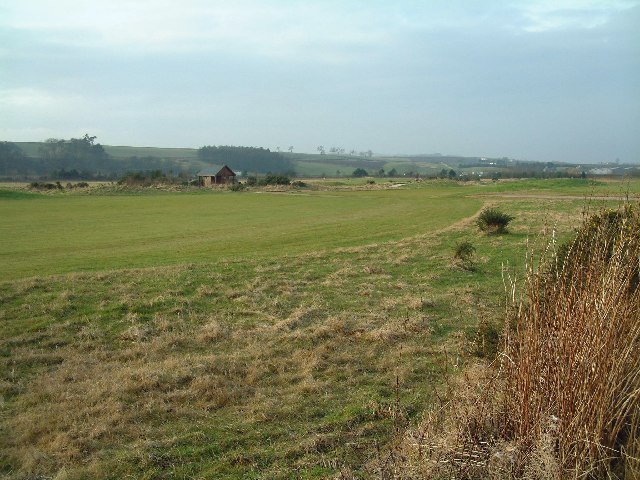
Strathtyrum Course fairway of St Andrews Links

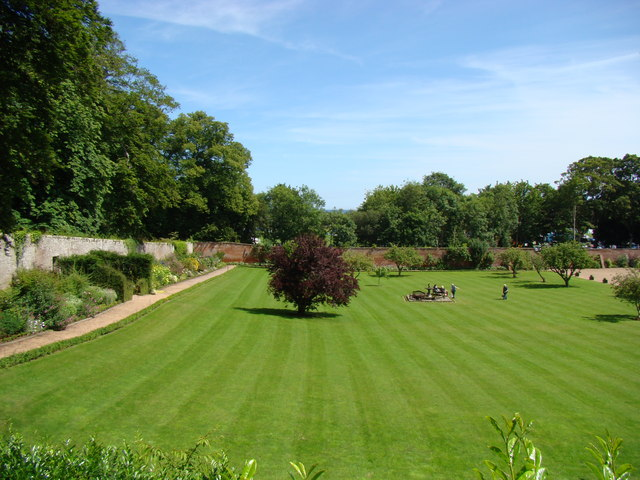
Strathtyrum House's walled garden

The estate was owned by St Andrews Cathedral Priory prior to the Reformation, whereafter ownership was granted to the Duke of Lennox and it subsequently changed hands several times. It was purchased by Archbishop James Sharp in 1669 and by James Cheape, the son of a laird, in 1782.

The adjacent property of St Andrews Links on the northern side of the estate was acquired by James Cheape in 1821 and sold by his brother's grandson, also named James Cheape, to The Royal and Ancient Golf Club of St Andrews in 1893. Control of St Andrews Links was regulated by an act of Parliament in 1894 and another in 1974 which resulted in the creation of the St Andrews Links Trust. The Strathtyrum Course of St Andrews Links, which was opened in 1993, was built on land that was previously part of the estate and sold to the St Andrews Links Trust by Mrs Gladys Cheape in 1986. The Strathtyrum estate was subsequently inherited by Henry Ismay Cheape.

== Buildings ==
There are several buildings on the estate including the main residential building Strathtyrum House located opposite the Old Course at St Andrews, a Category A listed building built in the 18th century. It is a Georgian building three storeys high accompanied by riding stables, a mausoleum and a large walled garden. It was the rented country residence of publisher John Blackwood who died there in 1879.

While attending the University of St Andrews where they met, Prince William and his future wife Catherine Middleton lived in Balgove House on the estate for two years before graduating in 2005.

== See also ==
- List of Category A listed buildings in Fife
- List of listed buildings in St Andrews And St Leonards, Fife
