= List of actors who have played Jesus =

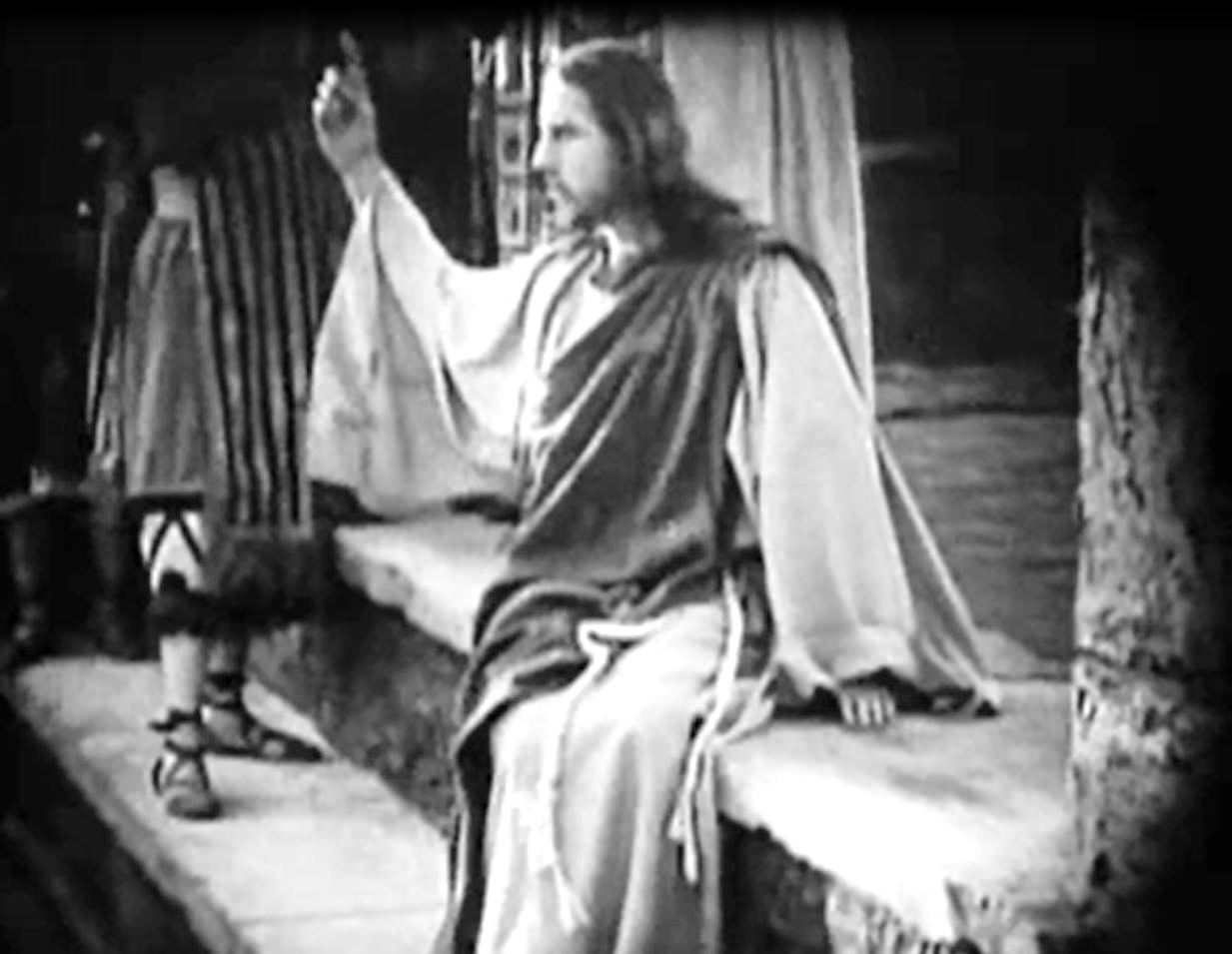
Howard Gaye as the Nazarene: "He that is without sin among you, let him first cast a stone at her." (Intolerance, 1916)

This is a list of film and television actors who have played Jesus.

== List ==
List of actors who have played Jesus
Actor(s)	Title	Year	Director(s)	Notes
Robert Henderson-Bland	From the Manger to the Cross	1912	Sidney Olcott	
George Fisher	Civilization	1916	Thomas H. Ince	
Howard Gaye	Intolerance	1916	D. W. Griffith	
Claude Payton	Ben-Hur	1925	Fred Niblo	
H.B. Warner	The King of Kings	1927	Cecil B. DeMille	
Robert Le Vigan	Golgotha	1935	Julien Duvivier	
Robert Wilson	The Living Christ Series	1951	John T. Coyle	
Donald C. Klune	The Robe	1953	Henry Koster	
Robert Wilson	Day of Triumph	1954	Irving Pichel and John T. Coyle	
Jon Shepodd	The Power of the Resurrection	1958	Harold D. Schuster	
Claude Heater	Ben-Hur	1959	William Wyler	
Jeffrey Hunter	King of Kings	1961	Nicholas Ray	
Roy Mangano	Barabbas	1961	Richard Fleischer	
Enrique Irazoqui	The Gospel According to St.Matthew	1964	Pier Paolo Pasolini	
Max von Sydow	The Greatest Story Ever Told	1965	George Stevens	
Donald Sutherland	Johnny Got His Gun	1971	Dalton Trumbo	
Kamal Haasan	Annai Velankanni	1971	K. Thangappan	
Victor Garber	Godspell	1973	David Greene	
Ted Neeley	Jesus Christ Superstar	1973	Norman Jewison	
Murali Das	Jesus	1973	P. A. Thomas	
Murali	Thomasleeha	1975	P. A. Thomas	
Robert Powell	Jesus of Nazareth	1977	Franco Zeffirelli	
Liam Neeson	Pilgrim's Progress	1978	Ken Anderson	
Vijayachander	Karunamayudu (Dayamayudu)	1978	A. Bhimsingh	
Kenneth Colley	Monty Python's Life of Brian	1979	Terry Jones	
Brian Deacon	Jesus	1979	Peter Sykes	
Chris Sarandon	The Day Christ Died	1980	James Cellan Jones	
Vijayachander	Rajadhi Raju	1980	Bapu	
John Hurt	History of the World, Part I	1981	Mel Brooks	
Michael Wilding Jr.	A.D.	1985	Stuart Cooper	
Jürgen Prochnow	The Seventh Sign	1988	Carl Schultz	
Willem Dafoe	The Last Temptation of Christ	1988	Martin Scorsese	
Vijaya Kumaranatunga	Christhu Charithaya	1990	Sunil Ariyaratne	Christhu Charithaya
Vincent Laresca	Bad Lieutenant	1992	Abel Ferrara	
Emil Malvar	Divine Mercy: Sa Buhay ni Sister Faustina	1993	Ben Yalung	
Bruce Marchiano	The Visual Bible: Matthew	1993	Regardt van den Bergh	
Mat Ranillo III	Kristo	1996	Ben Yalung	
Vijayachander	Dayasagar	1996	Vijayachander	
Jeremy Sisto	Jesus	1999	Roger Young	
Christian Bale	Mary, Mother of Jesus	1999	Kevin Connor	
Will Ferrell	Superstar	1999	Bruce McCulloch	
Maurício Gonçalves	O Auto da Compadecida	2000	Guel Arraes	
Glenn Carter	Jesus Christ Superstar	2000	Gale Edwards; Nick Morris	
David J. Francis	Dracula 2000	2000	Patrick Lussier	
Jan Michelini	The Apocalypse	2002	Raffaele Mertes	
Luigi Baricelli	Maria - Mãe do Filho de Deus	2003	Moacyr Góes	
Henry Ian Cusick	The Gospel of John	2003	Philip Saville	
Siva Krishna	Yesu Mahimalu	2003	Natti Kumar	
Scott McNeil	Ben Hur	2003	William R. Kowalchuk Jr.	
Jim Caviezel	The Passion of the Christ	2004	Mel Gibson	
Jonathan Scarfe	Judas	2004	Charles Robert Carner	
Krishna	Shanti Sandesham	2004	P. Chandrasekhar Reddy	
D'Arcy Browning	Cross and Bones	2005	Paul Carrière	
Robert Torti	Reefer Madness	2005	Andy Fickman	
Matthew Modine	Mary	2005	Abel Ferrara	
Suman	Mulla Kireetam	2005	N.S. Raja Reddy	
Ahmad Soleimani Nia	The Messiah	2007	Nader Talebzadeh	
Joseph Mawle	The Passion	2008	Michael Offer	
Love Thadani	May Bukas Pa	2009	Jerome C. Pobocan, Jojo A. Saguin, and Erick C. Salud	
Julian Casey	Ben Hur	2010	Steve Shill	
Shredy Jabarin	المخلص (The Savior, Arabic language film)	2014	Robert Savo	
Diogo Morgado	Son of God	2014	Christopher Spencer	
Selva Rasalingam	The Gospel of John	2014	David Batty	
Selva Rasalingam	The Gospel of Matthew	2014	David Batty	
Selva Rasalingam	The Gospel of Mark	2015	David Batty	
Selva Rasalingam	The Gospel of Luke	2015	David Batty	
Ewan McGregor	Last Days in the Desert	2015	Rodrigo Garcia	
Haaz Sleiman	Killing Jesus	2015	Christopher Menaul	
Juan Pablo Di Pace	A.D. The Bible Continues	2015	Ciaran Donnelly	
DJ Perry	40 Nights	2016	Jesse Low	
Joseph Mesiano	Joseph & Mary	2016	Roger Christian	
Rodrigo Santoro	Ben-Hur	2016	Timur Bekmambetov	
Cliff Curtis	Risen	2016	Kevin Reynolds	
Adam Greaves-Neal	The Young Messiah	2016	Cyrus Nowrasteh	
Aviv Alush	The Shack	2017	Stuart Hazeldine	
Jeremy Davies	American Gods	2017	Floria Sigismondi	
Jonathan Roumie	The Chosen	2017	Dallas Jenkins	
Joaquin Phoenix	Mary Magdalene	2018	Garth Davis	
DJ Perry	The Christ Slayer	2019	Nathaniel Nose	
Adam Bond	Good Omens	2019	Douglas Mackinnon	
John Legend	Jesus Christ Superstar Live in Concert	2019	David Leveaux; Alex Rudzinski	
Vivaan Shah	Yeshu	2020	Arvind Babbal	
Shayan Ardalan	40: The Temptation of Christ	2020	Douglas James Vail	
Juan Pablo Di Pace	Resurrection	2021	Ciaran Donnelly	
Max Giermann	Die Geschichte der Menschheit - leicht gekürzt	2022	Erik Haffner	
Oscar Isaac	The King of Kings	2025	Seong-ho Jang	
Jaakko Ohtonen	The Resurrection of the Christ: Part One	2027	Mel Gibson	
Jaakko Ohtonen	The Resurrection of the Christ: Part Two	2027	Mel Gibson	

== Notes ==
- Jesus (character) at IMDb

== See also ==
- The Nativity (1978)
- List of films set in ancient Rome § The Life of Jesus
- The Robe (1953)
- List of films based on the Bible
