= Scenes of Clerical Life =

1858 short story collection by George Eliot

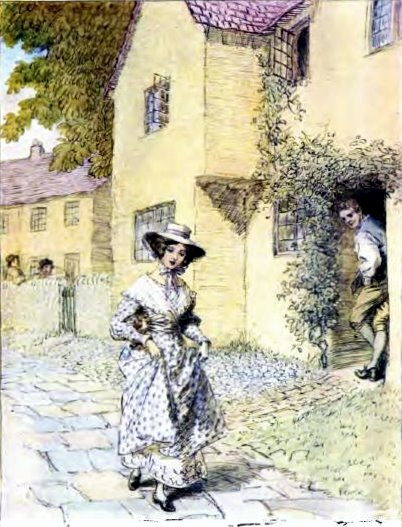
- Frontispiece of 1906 Macmillan edition of Scenes of Clerical Life drawn by Hugh Thomson
- Author: George Eliot
- Illustrator: Hugh Thomson
- Language: English
- Genre: Short story compilation
- Publisher: William Blackwood & Sons
- Publication date: 1858
- Publication place: United Kingdom
- Media type: Print (hardback & paperback)
- Followed by: Adam Bede

Scenes of Clerical Life is an 1858 collection of three short stories, published in book form, by George Eliot; it was Eliot's first published work of fiction and the first of her works to be released under her famous pseudonym. The stories were first published in Blackwood's Magazine over the course of the year 1857, initially anonymously, before being released as a two-volume set by Blackwood and Sons in January 1858. The three stories are set during the last twenty years of the eighteenth century and the early nineteenth century over a fifty-year period. The stories take place in and around the fictional town of Milby in the English Midlands. Each of the Scenes concerns a different Anglican clergyman, but is not necessarily centred upon him. Eliot examines, among other things, the effects of religious reform and the tension between the Established and the Dissenting Churches on the clergymen and their congregations, and draws attention to various social issues, such as poverty, alcoholism and domestic violence.

== Background ==
In 1856, Marian (or Mary Ann) Evans was, at the age of 36, already a renowned figure in Victorian intellectual circles, having contributed numerous articles to The Westminster Review and translated into English influential theological works by Ludwig Feuerbach and Baruch Spinoza. For her first foray into fiction she chose to adopt a pen name, "George Eliot". Her reasons for so doing are complex. While it was common for women to publish fiction under their own names, "lady novelists" had a reputation with which Evans did not care to be associated. In 1856 she had published an essay in the Westminster Review titled Silly Novels by Lady Novelists, which expounded her feelings on the subject. Moreover, the choice of a religious topic for "one of the most famous agnostics in the country" would have seemed ill-advised. The adoption of a pen name also served to obscure Evans' somewhat dubious marital status (she was openly living with the married George Henry Lewes).

It was largely due to the persuasion and influence of Lewes that the three Scenes first appeared in John Blackwood's Edinburgh Magazine. He submitted the first story, The Sad Fortunes of the Reverend Amos Barton, on 6 November 1856. At first it appeared anonymously, at Lewes' insistence. "I am not at liberty to reveal the veil of anonymity – even as regards social position. Be pleased, therefore, to keep the whole secret." Public and professional curiosity was not to be suppressed, however, and on 5 February 1857 the author's 'identity' was revealed to Blackwood's: "Whatever may be the success of my stories, I shall be resolute in preserving my incognito ... and accordingly I subscribe myself, best and most sympathising of editors, Yours very truly George Eliot."

For the settings of the stories, Eliot drew on her Warwickshire childhood. Chilvers Coton became Shepperton; Arbury Hall became Cheverel Manor, and its owner, Sir Roger Newdigate, Sir Christopher Cheverel. Nuneaton became Milby. Shepperton Church, described in detail in The Sad Fortunes of the Reverend Amos Barton, is recognisably that at Chilvers Coton. Further, the scandal attached to the curate of Chilvers Coton, whose wife was an intimate friend of the young Mary Ann Evans' mother, became the story of Amos Barton. Likewise, "Janet's Repentance" was largely based on events that took place in Nuneaton when the young Mary Anne Evans was at school, and which were recounted to her by her friend and mentor Maria Lewis. Mr Tryan is an idealised version of the evangelical curate John Edmund Jones, who died when Evans was aged twelve; the Dempsters seem to have been based on the lawyer J. W. Buchanan and his wife Nancy. Tryan's main area of concern, Paddiford Common, "hardly recognisable as a common at all", is similarly based on a real-life location, Stockingford.

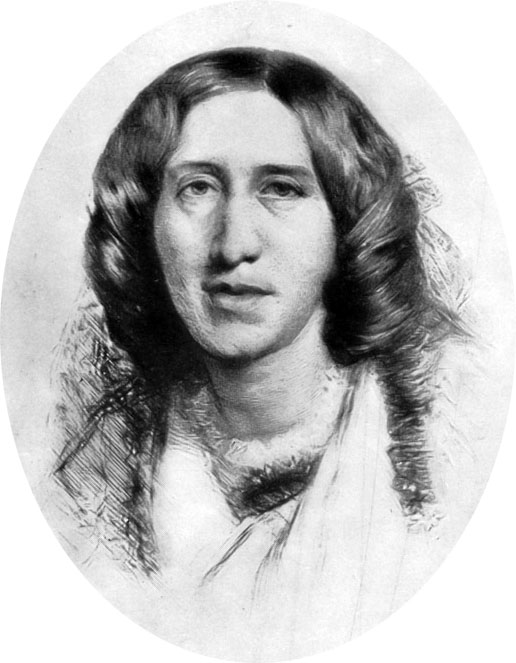
George Eliot

=== Religious context ===
George Eliot's intellectual journey to agnosticism had been circuitous, taking in "the easygoing Anglicanism of her family in the 1820s... the severe Calvinistic evangelicalism of her youth in the 1830s and her crisis of faith and search for a secular alternative to Christianity in the 1840s". (During her evangelical phase, she was an evangelical Anglican; Maria Lewis, her mentor during this period, was anti-Nonconformist and refused to take a position as governess in a Nonconformist household. This distinction is important; during the nineteenth century it had significant implications for class and status. The Church of England enjoyed a unique position as the established church, and all the clergymen in Scenes of Clerical Life, including Tryan, are portrayed as being members of it.) By 1842 she had become agnostic, refusing to attend church with her father. Her friendship with Charles and Cara Bray, Unitarians of Coventry, and her theological studies, were probably responsible for her renunciation of Christianity. Scenes of Clerical Life is sympathetic to the Church and its ministers, however; Eliot "was too secure in her own naturalistic ethics to need to become crudely anti-religious. What she demanded was a freedom from fanaticism, dogma, intolerance and inhumanity in the preachers of the Gospel".

During the period that George Eliot depicts in Scenes of Clerical Life, religion in England was undergoing significant changes. While Dissenting (Nonconformist) Churches had been established as early as the Church of England itself, the emergence of Methodism in 1739 presented particular challenges to the Established Church. Evangelicalism, at first confined to the Dissenting Churches, soon found adherents within the Church of England itself. Meanwhile, at the other end of the religious spectrum, the Oxford Movement was seeking to emphasise the Church of England's identity as a catholic and apostolic Church, reassessing its relationship to Roman Catholicism. Thus in the early 19th century Midlands that George Eliot would later depict, various religious ideas can be identified: the tension between the Established and the Dissenting Churches, and the differing strands within Anglicanism itself, between the low church, the high church and the Broad church.

== Plot summary ==
=== "The Sad Fortunes of the Reverend Amos Barton" ===
The titular character is the new curate of the parish church of Shepperton, a village near Milby. A pious man, but "sadly unsuited to the practice of his profession", Barton attempts to ensure that his congregation remains firmly within the care of the Church of England. His stipend is inadequate, and he relies on the hard work of Milly, his wife, to help keep the family. Barton is new to the village and subscribes to unpopular religious ideas; not all of the congregation accept him, but he feels that it is especially important to imbue them with what he sees as orthodox Christian views.

Barton and Milly become acquainted with Countess Caroline Czerlaski. When the Countess' brother, with whom she lives, gets engaged to be married to her maid, she leaves home in protest. Barton and his wife accept the Countess into their home, much to the disapproval of the congregation, who assume her to be his mistress. The Countess becomes a burden on the already stretched family, accepting their hospitality and contributing little herself. With Milly pregnant and ill, the children's nurse convinces the Countess to leave.

Milly and her baby die following its premature birth, and Barton is plunged into sadness at the loss. Barton's parishioners, who were so unsympathetic to him as their minister, support him and his family in their grief: "There were men and women standing in that churchyard who had bandied vulgar jests about their pastor, and who had lightly charged him with sin, but now, when they saw him following the coffin, pale and haggard, he was consecrated anew by his great sorrow, and they looked at him with respectful pity". Just as Barton is beginning to come to terms with Milly's death, he gets more bad news: the vicar, Mr. Carpe, will be taking over at Shepperton church; Barton is given six months' notice to leave. He has no choice but to comply, but is disheartened, having at last won the sympathies of the parishioners. Barton believes that the request was unfair, knowing that the vicar's brother-in-law is in search of a new parish in which to work. However, he resigns himself to the move and at length obtains a living in a distant manufacturing town.

The story concludes twenty years later with Barton at his wife's grave with one of his daughters, Patty. In the intervening years much has changed for Barton; his children have grown up and gone their separate ways. His son Richard is particularly mentioned as having shown talent as an engineer. Patty remains with her father.

=== "Mr. Gilfil's Love Story" ===
The second work in Scenes of Clerical Life is titled "Mr. Gilfil's Love-Story" and concerns the life of a clergyman named Maynard Gilfil. We are introduced to Mr Gilfil in his capacity as the vicar of Shepperton, 'thirty years ago' (presumably the late 1820s) but the central part of the story begins in June 1788 and concerns his youth, his experiences as chaplain at Cheverel Manor and his love for Caterina Sarti. Caterina, known to the family as 'Tina', is an Italian orphan and the ward of Sir Christopher and Lady Cheverel, who took her into their care following the death of her father. In 1788 she is companion to Lady Cheverel and a talented amateur singer.

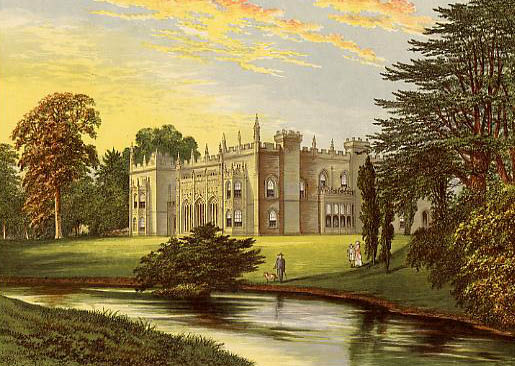
Arbury Hall, where Eliot's father was estate manager, and the model for Cheverel Manor

Gilfil's love for Tina is not reciprocated; she is infatuated with Captain Anthony Wybrow, nephew and heir of Sir Christopher Cheverel. Sir Christopher intends Wybrow to marry a Miss Beatrice Assher, the daughter of a former sweetheart of his, and that Tina will marry Gilfil. Wybrow, aware of and compliant to his uncle's intentions, nonetheless continues to flirt with Tina, causing her to fall deeply in love with him. This continues until Wybrow goes to Bath to press his suit to Miss Assher. He is then invited to the Asshers' home, and afterwards returns to Cheverel Manor, bringing with him Miss Assher and her mother. Wybrow dies unexpectedly. Gilfil, finding a knife on Tina, fears that she has killed him, but the cause of death is in fact a pre-existing heart condition. Tina runs away, and Gilfil and Sir Christopher fear that she has committed suicide. However, a former employee of Sir Christopher and Lady Cheverel returns to the manor to inform them that Tina has taken refuge with him and his wife. Gilfil seeks her out, helps her recover and marries her. It is hoped that marriage and motherhood, combined with Gilfil's love for her, which she now reciprocates, will endue her with a new zest for life. However, she dies in childbirth soon afterwards, leaving the curate to live out the rest of his life alone and to die a lonely man.

=== "Janet's Repentance" ===
Janet's Repentance is the only story in Scenes of Clerical Life set in the town of Milby itself. After Reverend Mr Tryan’s appointment to the chapel of ease at Paddiford Common, Milby’s residents are bitterly divided by religious differences. One party, headed by the lawyer Robert Dempster, vigorously supports the old curate, Mr Crewe; the other is equally biased in favour of the newcomer. Edgar Tryan is an evangelical, and his opponents consider him to be no better than a dissenter. Opposition is based variously in doctrinal disagreement and on a suspicion of cant and hypocrisy on the part of Mr Tryan; in Dempster's wife, Janet, however, it stems from her affection for Mr Crewe and his wife, and from her feeling that it is unkind to subject them to so much stress in their declining years. She supports her husband in a malicious campaign against Mr Tryan, despite the fact that Dempster is often drunkenly abusive to her, which drives her to drink as well. One night her husband turns her out of the house; she takes refuge with a neighbour. There, she recalls an encounter she had once had with Mr Tryan at the sickbed of a member of his flock, during which she had been struck both by his suffering and by his compassion, and this memory prompts her to ask him if he might come to see her. He visits her and encourages her in her struggle against her dependence on alcohol and in her religious conversion. Shortly afterwards, Robert Dempster is thrown from his gig and seriously injured. Upon discovering what has happened, Janet, forgiving him, returns to her home and nurses him throughout his subsequent illness, until he dies a few weeks later. Tryan continues to guide Janet toward redemption and self-sufficiency following the death of her husband. She, in turn, persuades him to move out of his inhospitable accommodation and into a house that she has inherited. It is hinted that a romantic relationship might subsequently develop between the two. His unselfish devotion to his needy parishioners has taken its toll on his health, however; he succumbs to consumption and dies young.

== Themes ==
=== Religion ===
The theme of religion is always present in Scenes of Clerical Life, but is not always the explicit focus. "Lewes had promised Blackwood that the Scenes would show the clergy in their 'human', rather than their 'theological' aspect. In fact, Eliot found the two aspects inseparable." Both "Mr Gilfil's Love Story" and "Janet's Repentance" are more concerned with an important female character than the clergyman, notwithstanding the title of the former. "Amos Barton" focuses on a figure who singularly fails to live out the religion he professes, but becomes an image of Christ through his suffering and grief, and, through his trials rather than through his successes, at last wins the love of his flock. In "Janet's Repentance", "Tryan, dying of tuberculosis at the age of thirty-three, is even more overtly an image of Christ than Amos Barton, embodying as well as preaching the gospel of forgiveness and redemption." Mr Gilfil in his later years also practises a doctrinally indistinct but none the less generous and kindly Christian lifestyle, demonstrating his beliefs through his actions rather than through any overt exposition of faith.

=== Social issues ===
George Eliot moves beyond religious doctrine and examines how beliefs are expressed in action, drawing attention to a number of social issues. Amos Barton, delivering incomprehensible sermons to the inhabitants of the workhouse, can hardly afford to feed his own family. In contrast, the bachelor Edgar Tryan embraces a life of poverty through choice, so that he can relate to his poorer parishioners. Janet's Repentance presents, unusually for the nineteenth century, a realist depiction of bourgeois domestic violence. "Its hallmarks are male aggression, female passivity and lack of self-esteem, and the wilful inaction of the surrounding community." (Lawson) The treatment of the heroine's alcoholism is also unusual: a "perspective on female alcoholism unmitigated by maternalism, poverty or wandering husbands [that was thought] necessary to a credibly sympathetic presentation of a "respectable" female alcoholic".

Even the quasi-Gothic melodrama of "Mr Gilfil's Love Story" raises some questions about social issues, dealing as it does with class, gender, and the aristocratic patronage of the arts. Captain Wybrow's privilege (as a male of higher status) over Caterina is exposed, as is the abuse of that privilege. Similarly, Sir Christopher's autocratic sway over his household and his estate is questioned: while his wishes for Maynard Gilfil and Caterina are ultimately fulfilled, it is at the expense of his dearer project, the inheritance.

== Characters ==
=== "The Sad History of the Reverend Amos Barton" ===
- Reverend Amos Barton – curate of the parish of Shepperton following the death of Mr Gilfil (see below). His theology is complex; his emphasis on the authority of the Church appears to be derived from Tractarianism, while other features of his belief seem more Evangelical. Either way, he is unpopular with his parishioners, being more concerned with their spiritual lives than with their practical needs. Physically, he is of nondescript appearance: "a narrow face of no particular complexion – even the smallpox that has attacked it seems to have been of a mongrel, indefinite kind – with features of no particular shape, and an eye of no particular expression... surmounted by a slope of baldness gently rising from brow to crown."
- Mrs Amelia "Milly" Barton – Amos' wife. Long-suffering, loving and patient, she represents all the virtues that Barton lacks himself. A "large, fair gentle Madonna", she works hard with mending and housework to sustain the family on their limited income.
- Countess Caroline Czerlaski – a glamorous neighbour of somewhat dubious reputation. She is "a little vain, a little ambitious, a little selfish, a little shallow, and frivolous, a little given to white lies". She is thought to be an impostor, but she really is a widow of an emigrant Polish count. She lives with a man who is popularly thought to be her lover, but is in fact her half-brother. Following this man's marriage (to Alice her maid) she asks the Bartons to be allowed to stay for a few weeks. This becomes months and the parishioners suspect that she is Mr Barton's mistress. She appears not to be concerned either by the damage she is inflicting on Barton's reputation, or about the increased strain she is putting on the household finances and, by extension, Milly.
- Nanny – the children's nurse, fiercely protective of Milly.
- Amos and Milly's children: Patty, Richard ("Dickey"), Sophy, Fred, Chubby and Walter. With the exception of the eldest two, they are not distinctively characterised.

=== "Mr Gilfil's Love Story" ===
- Maynard Gilfil – formerly the ward of Sir Christopher Cheverel, and subsequently curate of Shepperton, he is at the time the story takes place chaplain at Cheverel Manor. He is a tall, strong young man, devoted to Tina. "His healthy open face and robust limbs were after an excellent pattern for everyday wear". (By the time he appears at the beginning of "The Sad Fortunes of the Reverend Amos Barton" he has become "an excellent old gentleman, who smoked very long pipes and preached very short sermons".)
- Caterina "Tina" Sarti – a young girl of Italian parentage, but brought up in England by the childless Sir Christopher and Lady Cheverel. Her mother and siblings died in an epidemic; her father copied music for a living until his death. Having had a commission from Lady Cheverel, he entrusted his daughter to her. She is a passionate creature, feeling joy and grief intensely. In appearance, she is small and dark, and Sir Christopher often calls her his "black-eyed monkey".
- Captain Anthony Wybrow – nephew and heir of Sir Christopher, who has gone to considerable trouble and expense to ensure that the estate will pass to Wybrow, rather than his mother, Sir Christopher's sister. He is an extremely good-looking young man, compared by Eliot to Antinous, but selfish and shallow. He suffers from "palpitations". Having encouraged Tina's affections, he feels them to be a "nuisance" once he is engaged to Miss Assher, and cannot understand why the two women find it difficult to get on with each other.
- Sir Christopher Cheverel – "as fine a specimen of the old English gentleman as could well have been found in those days of cocked hats and pigtails", the Baronet. He is somewhat autocratic, but good-natured and affectionate towards his family and household.
- Lady Cheverel – wife of Sir Christopher, a "rather cold" woman. She has decided views about the propriety of a wife's submitting to her husband, and is somewhat disapproving of the headstrong Miss Assher as a result. "She is nearly fifty, but her complexion is still fresh and beautiful... her proud pouting lips, and her head thrown a little backward as she walks, give an expression of hauteur which is not contradicted by the cold grey eyes."
- Miss Beatrice Assher – daughter of an old flame of Sir Christopher's, she is intended by him to be Captain Wybrow's bride. A proud, beautiful woman, she feels it beneath her dignity to contend with Tina, who is considerably lower than her in terms of social status, for Captain Wybrow's affections.

=== "Janet's Repentance" ===
- Reverend Edgar Tryan – the recently appointed minister at the chapel of ease at Paddiford Common. He is young, but in poor health. Theologically, he is an evangelical. He explains to Janet Dempster that he entered the Church as a result of deep grief and remorse following the death of Lucy, a young woman whom he enticed to leave her home and then abandoned.
- Janet Dempster – wife of Robert Dempster. Described as a tall woman with dark hair and eyes, she has been married for fifteen years. She has turned to alcohol as an escape from her domestic problems. Initially she is strongly "anti-Tryanite", but reassesses her judgement of the clergyman after she meets him at a parishioner's sickbed.
- Robert Dempster – a lawyer of Milby. He is widely acknowledged as a skilled attorney, albeit not necessarily completely honest in his dealings. He drinks to excess and, when drunk, is given to abusing his wife, both verbally and physically.
- Mrs Raynor – Janet's mother. She subscribes to no particular religious doctrine, believing that she can find all the spiritual support that she needs through her own study of the Bible.
- Mr and Mrs Crewe – Mr Crewe is the long-established curate of Milby. Initially somewhat ridiculed by his parishioners, who laugh amongst themselves at his brown wig and his odd speaking voice, he gains support as the anti-Tryanite campaign mobilises. Mrs Crewe is old and deaf, and a great friend of Janet Dempster's. She pretends not to notice Janet's drinking problem.

== Reception and criticism ==
The publication of Amos Barton caused some alarm among those who – rightly or wrongly – suspected that they had been the models for the characters, few of whom are described in a flattering manner. Eliot was forced to apologise to John Gwyther, who had been the local curate in her childhood, and to whom the character of Barton himself bore more than a passing resemblance.

Initial criticism of Amos Barton was mixed, with Blackwood's close friend W. G. Hamley "dead against Amos" and Thackeray diplomatically noncommittal. However, the complete Scenes of Clerical Life was met with 'just and discerning applause', and considerable speculation as to the identity of its author. Sales were no better than satisfactory, following a first printing of 1,500 copies, but Blackwood was none the less confident of Eliot's talent. Early reviewers deemed the writer "religious, without cant or intolerance" and "strong in his [sic] knowledge of the human heart". It was praised for its realism: one contemporary review noted approvingly that "the fictitious element is securely based upon a broad groundwork of actual truth, truth as well in detail as in general". Due to its subject matter, it was widely assumed to be the work of a real-life country parson; one such even attempted to take the credit. Popular opinion in Eliot's home town attributed the work to a Mr Joseph Liggins, who attempted ineffectually to deny the rumours, and eventually accepted the undeserved celebrity. George Eliot's "identity" was revealed in a letter to The Times, but this claim was immediately refuted in a letter from Eliot herself. In 1858 Charles Dickens wrote to Eliot to express his approval of the book, and was among the first to suggest that Scenes of Clerical Life might have been written by a woman.

I have been so strongly affected by the two first tales in the book you have had the kindness to send me, through Messrs. Blackwood, that I hope you will excuse my writing to you to express my admiration of their extraordinary merit. The exquisite truth and delicacy both of the humour and the pathos of these stories, I have never seen the like of; and they have impressed me in a manner that I should find it very difficult to describe to you. if I had the impertinence to try. In addressing these few words of thankfulness to the creator of the Sad Fortunes of the Rev. Amos Barton, and the sad love-story of Mr. Gilfil, I am (I presume) bound to adopt the name that it pleases that excellent writer to assume. I can suggest no better one: but I should have been strongly disposed, if I had been left to my own devices, to address the said writer as a woman. I have observed what seemed to me such womanly touches in those moving fictions, that the assurance on the title-page is insufficient to satisfy me even now. If they originated with no woman, I believe that no man ever before had the art of making himself mentally so like a woman since the world began.

More recently, Scenes of Clerical Life has been interpreted mainly in relation to Eliot's later works. It has been claimed that "in Scenes of Clerical Life, her style and manner as a novelist were still in the making". Ewen detects "an obvious awkwardness in the handling of the materials of the Scenes and a tendency... to moralize", but affirms that "these stories are germinal for the George Eliot to come". "The emergent novelist is glimpsed in the way in which the three scenes interpenetrate to establish a densely textured, cumulative study of a particular provincial location, its beliefs and customs and way of life."

== Subsequent releases and interpretations ==
Scenes of Clerical Life has been reprinted in book form several times since 1858, including five editions within Eliot's lifetime. The three stories were released separately by Hesperus Press over the years 2003 to 2007. A silent film based on "Mr. Gilfil's Love Story" was released in 1920, starring R. Henderson Bland as Maynard Gilfil and Mary Odette as Caterina.

In 1898 the work Newdigate-Newdegate Cheverels was issued by Lady Newdigate-Newdegate In this book, the letters written by Lady Hester Margaretta Mundy Newdigate to her husband Sir Roger Newdigate are compiled and commented that had inspired Eliot's Scenes of Clerical Life.

== Bibliography ==
- Eliot, George (1998). Scenes of Clerical Life. Jennifer Gribble. New York: Penguin. ISBN 9780140436389.
