= John Blackwood (publisher) =

Scottish publisher

John Blackwood FRSE (1818–1879) was a Scottish editor and publisher, sixth son of William Blackwood, founder of the publishing company William Blackwood & Sons. In 1845, John Blackwood became manager and editor of Blackwood’s Edinburgh Magazine (aka Maga) after the death of his oldest brother, Alexander, later becoming head of the firm at the death of his brother Robert. Blackwood died in 1879, having managed the company for thirty-four years, the longest of all the Blackwood editors.

== Life ==
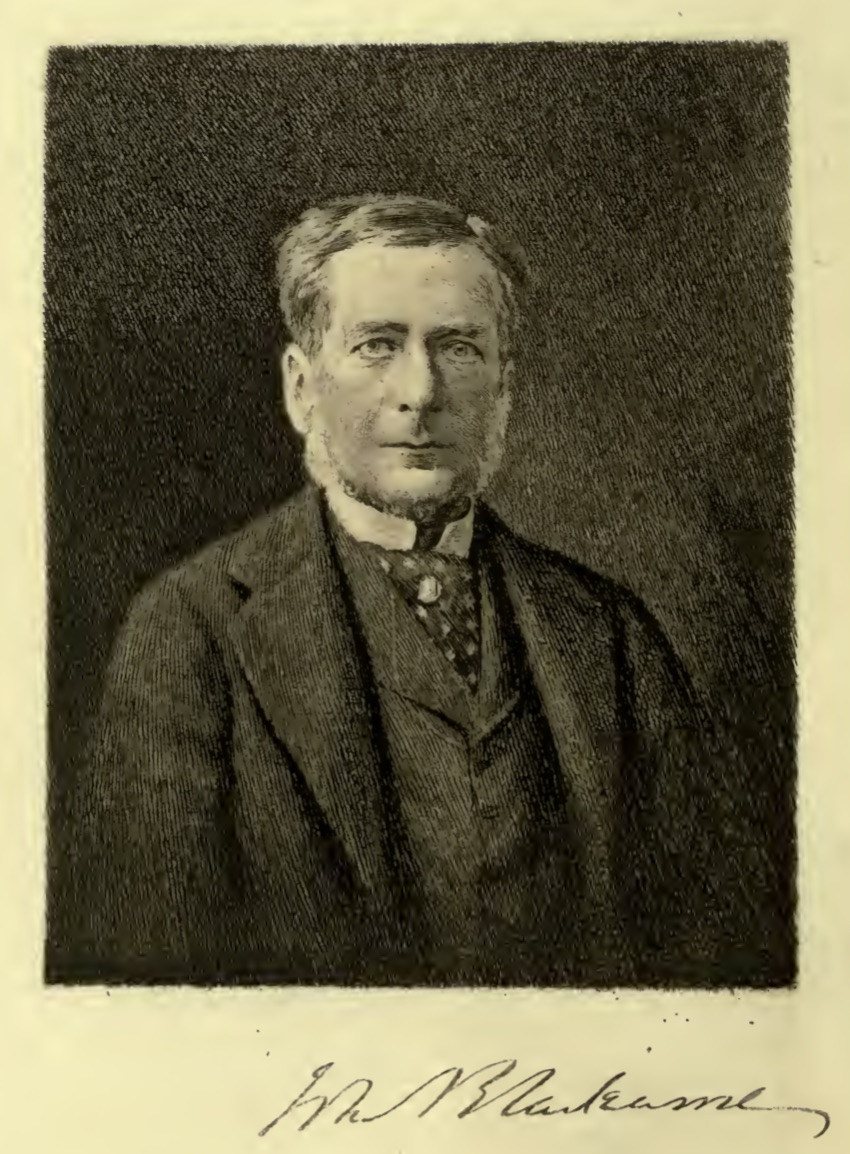
John Blackwood, from a photograph taken at Rome, ca. 1878

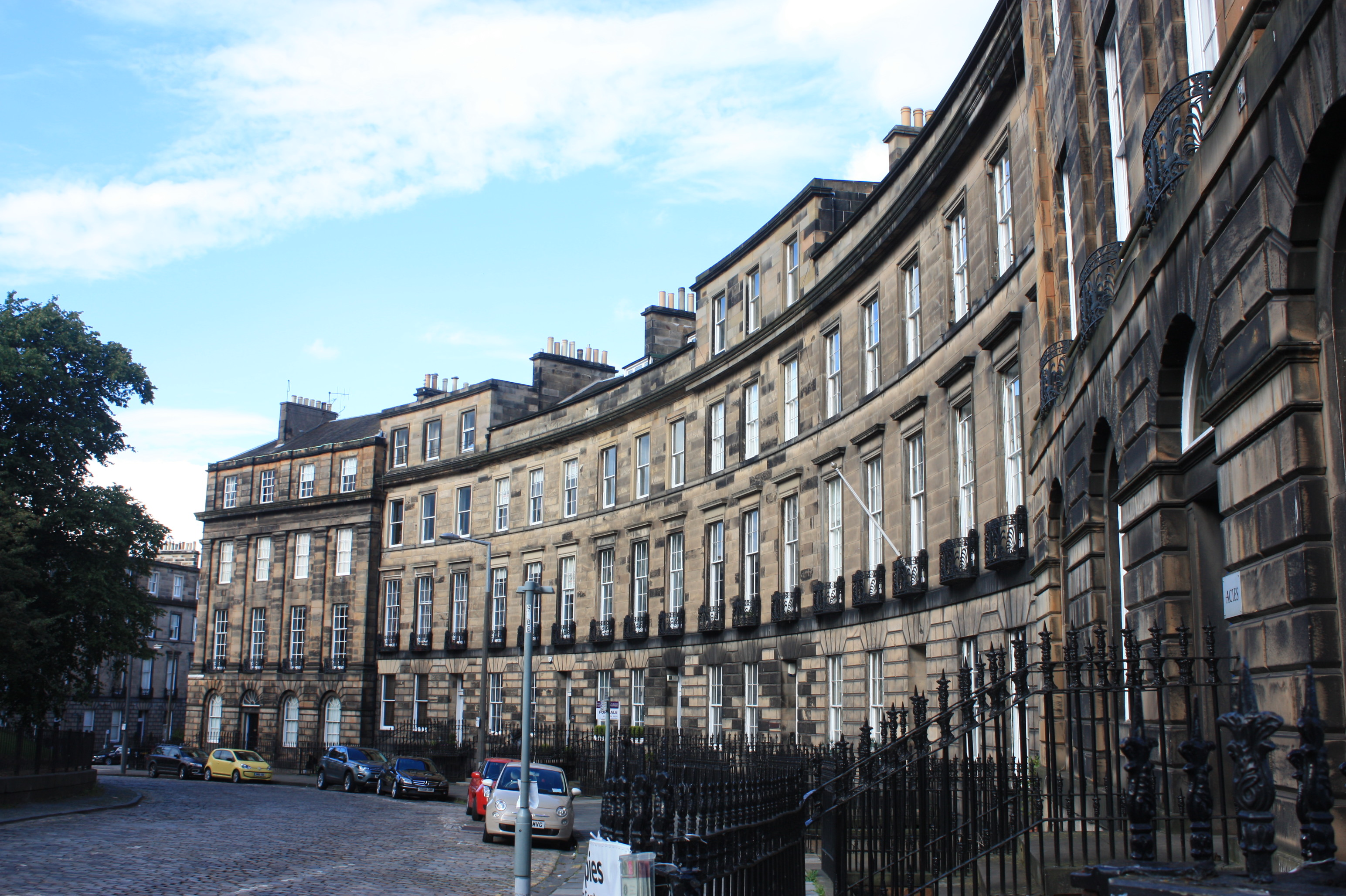
Randolph Crescent

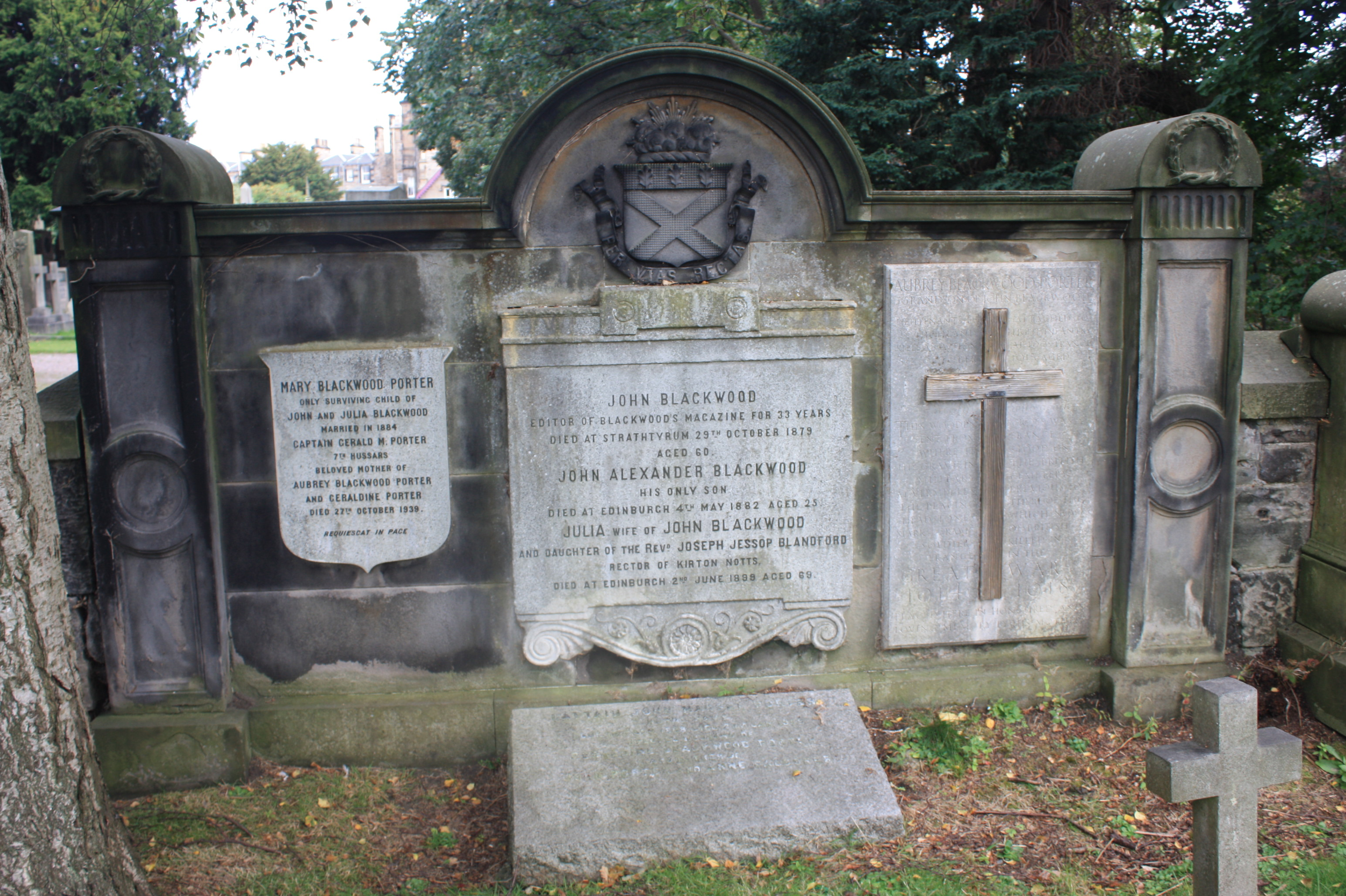
John Blackwood's grave, Dean Cemetery

John Blackwood was born at 2 Salisbury Road in south Edinburgh on 7 December 1818. Educated at the High School in Edinburgh and the University of Edinburgh, as a young man Blackwood displayed literary tastes, procuring for himself the nickname "the little Editor". At age 16, Blackwood spent three years in continental travel during his Grand Tour with his brother Alexander and his tutor, Mr. William Hay. In Europe, Blackwood excelled in French and Italian, keeping much of his language skill during his adult life, and met Wordsworth.

In 1838, Blackwood began work in London learning the publishing trade at Whittaker & Co. In 1840, Blackwood's older brothers gave John the responsibility of managing the London business at 22 Pall Mall and five years later at 37 Paternoster Row. Blackwood's office became a place for literary rendezvous, with visitors such as John Gibson Lockhart of the Quarterly Review; John Delane, editor of The Times; and William Makepeace Thackeray, author for Punch and of the novel Vanity Fair. The latter two associates became intimate friends with Blackwood. One of Blackwood's functions in London was to recruit authors for Maga, and it was in London that Blackwood formed an association with Lord Edward Bulwer-Lytton, who began in 1842 to contribute to the magazine his translation of the poems and ballads of Friedrich Schiller. In 1845, Blackwood returned to Edinburgh to manage and edit Maga after the death of Alexander, while his brother Robert maintained the business side of the magazine. At the death of Robert in 1852, John became head of William Blackwood & Sons publishing house. Then John's brother Major William Blackwood II shared the partnership with John until his death in 1861, when his son, William Blackwood III, became partner and worked side by side with John.

Although Blackwood was a staunch conservative and published the chief monthly periodical of conservatism, he welcomed authors without regard to political affiliations. As editor, he sought quality of writing over name recognition and worked quickly and efficiently. He recognised what the public wanted and carefully chose the best author who would handle the subject. Blackwood managed his team firmly and with a notable sense of humor, tactfully warding off authorial concerns. Above all, Blackwood maintained amiable and intimate relations with many authors, famously declaring in a speech he gave at the 1871 Scott Centenary Banquet at St. Andrews, Scotland, that "Authors had been his dearest friends and companions all the days of his life" and that "he could turn [to them] in joy and sorrow for safe and certain sympathy".

Blackwood's most famous literary relationship was with George Eliot, author of Middlemarch. In 1856, George Henry Lewes, Eliot's companion and business partner, introduced Eliot to Blackwood through her short story, "The Sad Fortunes of the Reverend Amos Barton", first in a series of stories later combined as Scenes of Clerical Life, and Blackwood immediately recognised her talent. Consistently encouraging Eliot, Blackwood became an important part of Eliot's growth in confidence, and she wrote all of her books for Blackwood's except one, Romola. This commencement of a business connection with Eliot soon developed into one of friendship that lasted their lives. Upon the final illness that preceded the death of Blackwood, Eliot wrote to Lewes's son, "He will be a heavy loss to me. He has been bound up with what I most cared for in my life for more than twenty years and his good qualities have made many things easy to me that without him would often have been difficult".

For the last twenty years of his life, Blackwood split his home between Strathtyrum, his rented country house near St. Andrews, Scotland, and owned by the Cheape family, and his home in the New Town of Edinburgh at 3 Randolph Crescent on the southern edge of the Moray Estate. He also often worked in London. A passionate lover of golf, Blackwood played every afternoon while at his country home, enjoying the famed Links near St. Andrews such a short distance from Strathtyrum. Often with his family, in evenings Blackwood walked to the nearby North Sea adjacent to the property and viewed St. Andrews Bay and the Bell Rock Lighthouse. A wide variety of guests enjoyed visiting Strathtyrum, including Anthony Trollope, author of Framley Parsonage; Jefferson Davis, president of the former Confederate States; and Captain John Hanning Speke, discoverer of the source of the Nile.

Married in 1854, Blackwood and his wife Julia had two children: Mary, who would later write volume three of the Annals of a Publishing House, which focused on the life of her father; and John, or, Jack, who died in 1882 at the young age of 25, having served in Sir Arthur Halkett's Militia in 1878.

John Blackwood died at Strathtyrum House on 29 October 1879. Blackwood is buried on a small west-facing section of wall on the southern edge of Dean Cemetery in Edinburgh. A secondary memorial to John is within his father's family vault in Old Calton Burial Ground.

To this day, the Blackwood family still live in Ayrshire, Scotland, around the Doon Valley area and other parts of Ayrshire.
