= Hessian =

A Hessian is an inhabitant of the German state of Hesse.

Hessian may also refer to:

== Named from the toponym ==
- Hessian (soldier), eighteenth-century German regiments in service with the British Empire
  - Hessian (boot), a style of boot
  - Hessian fabric, coarse woven material
  - Hessian fly or barley midge, a species of fly (thought to be introduced by Hessian soldiers)
- Hessian dialects, West Central German group of dialects
- Hessian crucible, a type of ceramic crucible
- Hessian Cup, a regional cup competition in German football

== Named for Otto Hesse ==
- Hessian matrix, in mathematics, is a matrix of second partial derivatives
  - Hessian affine region detector, a feature detector used in the fields of computer vision and image analysis
  - Hessian automatic differentiation
  - Hessian equations, partial differential equations (PDEs) based on the Hessian matrix
- Hessian pair or Hessian duad in mathematics
- Hessian form of an elliptic curve
- Hessian group
- Hessian polyhedron
- Glossary of classical algebraic geometry § Hessian, other mathematical objects called Hessian

== Other uses ==
- Hessian (Web service protocol)
- The Hessian, a 1972 novel by Howard Fast

== People with the name ==
- Patrick J. Hessian (1928–2007), United States Army officer
- Stephen Hessian (1891–1962), Canadian lawyer and political figure
- Toby Hessian (born 1969), British rower
