= General Post =

1921 film

- Directed by: Thomas Bentley
- Written by: Eliot Stannard
- Based on: General Post (play) by J. E. Harold Terry
- Starring: Douglas Munro; Robert Henderson Bland; Lilian Braithwaite; Joyce Dearsley
- Production company: Ideal Film Company
- Distributed by: Ideal Film Company
- Release date: 1920
- Country: United Kingdom
- Languages: Silent; English intertitles

General Post is a 1920 British silent drama film directed by Thomas Bentley and starring Douglas Munro, Lilian Braithwaite and Joyce Dearsley. It was based on the play General Post by J. E. Harold Terry in which Lillian Braithwaite had appeared when it premiered at the Haymarket Theatre in March 1917.

== Plot ==
During the First World War a small-town tailor rises to become a General.

== Cast ==
- Douglas Munro...Albert Smith
- Lilian Braithwaite...Lady Broughton
- Joyce Dearsley...Betty Broughton
- Robert Henderson Bland...Edward Smith
- Dawson Milward...Denys Broughton
- Colstan Mansell...Alec Broughton
- Teddy Arundell...Jobson
- Sara de Groot...Miss Prendergast
- Adelaide Grace...Lady Wareing
- Thomas Canning...Lord Wareing
- Irene Drew...Mary Wareing
