= Brian Hession =

Anglican priest (1909–1961)

Reverend Brian Hession
- Born: 12 August 1909; Hendon, Middlesex, England
- Died: 5 October 1961 (aged 52); Lambeth, London, England
- Occupations: Church of England Priest, Religious Film Maker and Cancer Patient Advocate
- Notable work: From the Manger to the Cross (film, 1937); Determined To Live (memoir, 1957); Bridge to God (1961)

Reverend Brian Hession (12 August 1909 – 5 October 1961) was an English Anglican priest and military chaplain. He was the vicar of Holy Trinity Walton, Aylesbury from 1937 to 1949, and served as the military chaplain at RAF Halton from 1935 to 1937.

== Early life and education ==
Hession was born in Hendon, Middlesex, England in August 1909 to Colin and Ida Hession. His brother was Roy Hession, a well-known evangelical preacher who in 1950 authored the religious book The Calvary Road. Brian's father served in the armed forces during World War I, and after returning home in 1919, was diagnosed with general paralysis of the insane, which is now commonly referred to as neurosyphilis. Colin died in 1921 of the ailment at Napsbury Hospital, which was used as a military and mental health asylum at the time.

In 1927, Hession was accepted to Christ's College, Cambridge, where he earned a degree in theology, and also studied film. He continued his religious studies thereafter at Trinity College, Bristol and was ordained as a priest in 1931. He served as a curate at St. Margaret's, Lee in Blackheath between 1931 and 1935, an as the military chaplain for RAF Halton from 1935-1937.

== Ordained ministry ==
In May 1937, Hession was appointed vicar of Holy Trinity church, Walton, in the parish of Aylesbury, approximately fifty miles north-west of London. In his first sermon, Hession introduced early multi-media programming, showing films and film slides to the congregation. He also served as the Mayor's Chaplain in Aylesbury during this period.

== Dawn Trust Films ==
During his tenure as vicar of Holy Trinity Walton, Hession created Dawn Trust Films, a film production and distribution company that aimed to bring religious themes to the mainstream film industry. His efforts were met with some resistance from the Church, which was struggling with the role that film should play in the message of the Church. In 1938, Hession obtained the rights to the 1912 classic Sidney Olcott film, From the Manger to the Cross and transformed it into a "talkie" film. Several members of the Church hierarchy were not impressed with Hession's film and attempted to have it censored from theatres and churches. Nevertheless, Hession persisted and in March 1938, Queen Mary agreed to view the film at a special showing at Fulham Palace. Queen Mary reportedly enjoyed the film and gave positive feedback to both Hession and the film's star actor, R. Henderson-Bland.

== Resignation from vicar role ==
In 1949, Hession resigned his post as vicar of Holy Trinity because he was suffering poor health, which he was told at the time was the result of great stress that purportedly caused him to suffer painful duodenal ulcers. After his resignation, Hession relocated to Poole Harbour, England and focussed exclusively on his Dawn Trust Films movement, as well as occasionally preaching at local churches. He also traveled to the United States and Continental Europe, showing films and preaching to a growing audience.

== Cancer ==
=== Diagnosis ===
In July 1954, on a plane trip between Los Angeles and Marvin, Texas for a preaching engagement, Hession fell badly ill and was overcome with pain. He was rushed to a Los Angeles hospital and the doctors quickly diagnosed him with advanced colon cancer, which had likely existed for several years but had been mis-diagnosed as duodenal ulcers. Hession was told he had "three days to live." He was told to get his affairs in order and to come to terms with his imminent death.

Hession refused to accept this diagnosis, and immediately began calling surgeons. One surgeon, Dr. John Howard Payne, agreed to conduct the risky surgery, freely disclosing to Hession that the surgery would either be a success or he would be unlikely to survive the operation. Hession understood and agreed to the risk. The surgery required over eight hours in the operating room and the cancer was far more severe than anticipated. Nevertheless, the surgery was a success and Hession began the long process of recovery.

He did not let the disease slow him for very long, and Hession soon found a new calling: advocacy for cancer patients facing the stigma of a disease that was still rarely discussed, often referred to as simply "the C word."

=== Cancer Anonymous ===
As a means to move forward his campaign to educate the general public about cancer and its survivability, Hession created an organization called Cancer Anonymous, loosely based on tenets of the Alcoholics Anonymous movement. The organization distributed educational pamphlets and organized meetings for patients and their loved ones, urging against stigmatizing or ignoring the disease, an advocating for preventative measures and early detection efforts. His work was well-received and has been compared to C.S. Lewis and his efforts to reconcile death and pain with religious belief. In 1957, Hession appeared on the well-known British television show This Is Your Life to spread his message to hundreds of thousands of viewers.

Hession was also featured dozens of times on BBC Radio, including on such prominent programmes as The Silver Lining and Lift Up Your Hearts. His discussions about pain and the need to be open about the grieving process was very well received by the audience.

Hession continued his campaign in the United States, meeting with, among others, Eleanor Roosevelt, Nelson Rockefeller and Mary Pickford in is efforts to spread his words and encouragement to cancer patients and their families.

=== Metastasis of cancer ===
Despite Hession's determination to survive and live a full life with cancer, the cancer soon spread, metastasizing to his lung and to his liver. Ever resilient and relentless, Hession had four additional surgeries, having one of his lungs completely removed and his second lung partially removed, in operations that were at the forefront of medical science, having been experimented with over the prior decade with tuberculosis patients. The surgeries were successful in extending the length and quality of Hession's life. However, by the time the cancer spread to his liver, there was little left to be done. He accepted experimental medication, including a treatment from renowned scientist Jonas Salk, and fought tirelessly not only for his life but to spread his message of hope faster than the disease spread through his body. He continued to speak and travel throughout his treatments, up until the pain became too great to bear in early September 1961.

In late September 1961, Hession entered St. Thomas' Hospital in London, where he died on 5 October 1961, over seven years after his doctors gave him only "three days to live."

== Legacy ==
Hession wrote and published six books regarding religion and illness, which were republished for many years after he died. His story was captured in the four part, award-winning docu-series The Reverend's Secret Mission, which aired on Amazon Video in 2019.
