= Elm Farm, Aylesbury =

Housing estate in Aylesbury, Buckinghamshire, England

Coordinates: 51.802654°N 0.797798°W

Elm Farm
- Location within Buckinghamshire
- OS grid reference: SP8212
- Civil parish: Aylesbury
- Unitary authority: Buckinghamshire
- Ceremonial county: Buckinghamshire
- Region: South East
- Country: England
- Sovereign state: United Kingdom
- Post town: AYLESBURY
- Postcode district: HP21
- Dialling code: 01296
- Police: Thames Valley
- Fire: Buckinghamshire
- Ambulance: South Central
- UK Parliament: Aylesbury

Elm Farm is a modern housing estate Built in the 1970s in Aylesbury, Buckinghamshire, England and one of the last new estates to be built within the parish boundary of Aylesbury.

It has its own football team called Elm Farm FC and in the political geography of the town it now forms a ward with Mandeville.

== Education ==
William Harding Combined School is a mixed primary school in Elm Farm. It is a community school, which takes children from the age of 4 through to the age of 11. The school has approximately 700 pupils. The school is named after William Harding of Walton.
