= From the Manger to the Cross =

1912 film by Sidney Olcott

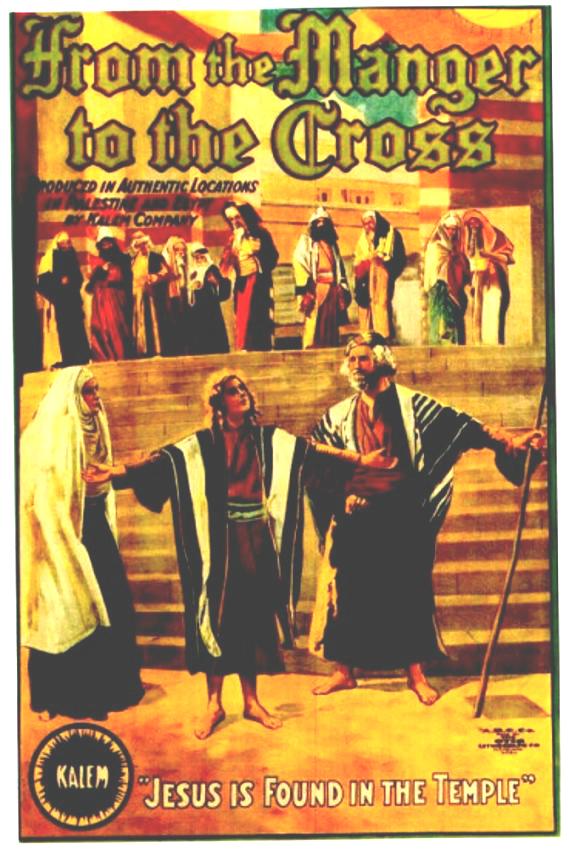
- Theatrical poster
- Directed by: Sidney Olcott
- Written by: Gene Gauntier
- Produced by: Frank J. Marion
- Starring: Robert Henderson-Bland; Gene Gauntier; Alice Hollister; Robert G. Vignola
- Cinematography: George K. Hollister
- Distributed by: Kalem
- Release dates: October 3, 1912 (London); October 17, 1912 (New York City)
- Running time: 71 minutes
- Country: United States
- Language: Silent (English intertitles)
- Budget: $35,000
- Box office: >$1 million

From The Manger To The Cross (1912)

From the Manger to the Cross or Jesus of Nazareth (often shortened to simply From the Manger to the Cross) is a 1912 American drama film directed by Sidney Olcott, written by Gene Gauntier (who also portrays Virgin Mary), and starring Robert Henderson-Bland as Jesus of Nazareth. Filmed on location in Jerusalem, it tells the story of Jesus's life, interspersed with verses from The Bible.

Kalem released the film in October 1912 to critical acclaim. It saw a re-release in February 1919 following Vitagraph Studios' acquisition of Kalem.

== Cast ==
- Robert Henderson-Bland as Jesus
- Percy Dyer as Boy Jesus
- Gene Gauntier as the Virgin Mary
- Alice Hollister as Mary Magdalene
- Sidney Olcott as Blind Man
- Samuel Morgan as Pontius Pilate
- James D. Ainsley as John the Baptist
- Robert G. Vignola as Judas Iscariot
- Helen Lindroth as Martha
- George Kellog as Herod
- Jack J. Clark as John the Apostle
- J. P. McGowan as a Wise Man
- Montague Sidney as Joseph
- F. Owen Sterling as Unknown
- Thos J. Wentworth as a Wise Man
- G. Howard Barton as a Wise Man
- Frederic Bryson as Unknown
- Leslie D. Thomas as Peter (Saint-Pierre)
- Frank T. Gregory as Andrew
- Harry Lennox as James
- H. H. Kerr as Bartholomew
- Jack Melville as James
- Denton Harcourt as Matthew
- J. M. Baber as Thaddeus
- Ralph T. Duncan as Simon
- William Smiley as Lazarus
- F. R. Payne as a leper
- Huntley Roma as a palsied man
- James H. Wilson as the son of the widow
- Ruth Middelton as the widow
- G. W. Martin as Thomas
- Carl Vincent as Simon of Cyrene
- Lydia Gardebeau as Salome
- H. L. Lumt as Penitent Thief
- F. T. Bostock as Impenitent thief

== Production background ==
Herbert Reynolds has shown how Olcott used James Tissot's illustrations for his The Life of our Saviour Jesus Christ (1896-1897) as the basis for numerous shots in the film. The head of Kalem, Frank J. Marion, presented a copy to the troupe as they departed for the Middle East.

According to Turner Classic Movies, the film cost $35,000 to produce (roughly between $820,897 and $1.17 million adjusted to 2025 dollars); another source says that Olcott spent $100,000 of his own money on the project. Although the film's profits eventually amounted to almost $1 million (roughly $23.5 million to $33.4 million), the Kalem directors refused to increase Olcott's basic salary, and he resigned.

In later years, Louis B. Mayer, head of Metro-Goldwyn-Mayer, would say this was the premiere film for his movie theater in Haverhill, Massachusetts and a major boost for him in the movie business. However, most sources place the release date of this film as 1912, long after the opening of Mayer's theater.

At around 5,000 feet it was one of the longest films to be released to date, although the Kinemacolor documentary With Our King and Queen Through India released in February 1912 ran to 16,000 feet; and another religious film The Miracle (the first full-colour feature film) - was released in the UK at 7,000 feet in December 1912.

== Reception in Britain ==
The five-reel film showed at the Queen's Hall, London, for eight months (a relatively lengthy run for the time). A statement by Israel Zangwill (founder of the Jewish Territorialist Organization) hailing it as "An artistic triumph — the kinema put to its true end" appeared on advertising bills outside the Queen's Hall.

From the Manger to the Cross gained considerable publicity from an outcry in the Daily Mail: "Is nothing sacred to the film maker?" it demanded, and waxed indignant about the profits for its American investors. Although the clergy were invited and found little to be affronted by, the controversy resulted in the voluntary creation of the British Board of Film Censors, which began operating on 1 January 1913.

== Rediscovery ==
The film disappeared from cinema screens for a number of years until Reverend Brian Hession, vicar of Holy Trinity Church in Walton, Aylesbury, Buckinghamshire, went on a quest to the US to find a copy of the film for re-issue in Britain. Although initially disappointed, he eventually discovered a set of negatives after searching in the vaults and cellars of old film concerns. Hession added a musical sound track and spoken commentary, and From the Manger to the Cross was re-released in 1938.

== Critical reception ==
TCM host Robert Osborne and the National Film Preservation Foundation consider this film to be the most important silent film to deal with the life of Christ. In 1998, the United States Library of Congress deemed the film "culturally, historically, or aesthetically significant" and selected it for preservation in the National Film Registry.

A history of cinemas and film-making published in 1947 had this to say: "To-day it appears to be somewhat overacted, and the camera work is stilted, the camera being merely a recording instrument and not part of the pattern of the exposition of the story itself. Its pace is slow by modern standards, doubtless an attempt to obtain dignity, and Bland's performance is so sedately remote as to be not so much an acting performance at all but a series of dignified poses."
