= Roy Hession =

British evangelist and author

- Born: April 10, 1908; London, England
- Died: 1992 (aged 83–84)

Roy Hession (1908–1992) was a British evangelist and author.

== Early life ==
Hession was born in London in 1908. He was educated at Aldenham School where his introduction to religion led him to expect "anything but boredom" from God.

== Conversion ==
He accepted Jesus in 1926 while on a Christian holiday camp, largely through the witness of a cousin who was a navy officer. After working for Barings, the merchant bank, for ten years, he committed himself to full-time preaching and became one of the most effective Christian evangelists in post-World War II Britain, especially among young people.

His understanding of the Christian life underwent a radical change in 1947 following a conference that he had arranged to which he invited members of the East African Revival Movement. He was very much influenced by their strong emphasis on a personal implementation of the basics of the Christian faith, in particular the healing powers of openness and repentance.

== Preaching ==
His preaching subsequently incorporated these new insights. This brought criticism because of its introspective element, from some he had previously worked with, but it was much appreciated by many Christians on both sides of the Atlantic.

In the years that follow Roy, together with Dr. Joe Church, the leader of a group of missionaries from East Africa, ministered to many churches and conferences in Europe, Brazil, Indonesia, North America and Africa.

He was also involved for more than forty years in organising Christian holiday conferences for family groups at Abergele, Clevedon and Southwold in the United Kingdom.

== Theology ==
Roy Hession's theology was borrowed to the Holiness and Keswick teachings. In particular his views on soteriology were Arminian.

== Death ==
In 1967 he lost his first wife, Revel, in a road accident. In 1968, he married Pamela Greaves who had worked as a missionary in East Africa. Hession died in 1992.

== Continuation of his ministry ==
The ministry of his books is promoted worldwide by the Roy Hession Book Trust, based in the United Kingdom, and the Great Commission Foundation in North America.

== Works ==
Altogether, Roy had ten books published, some of them co-authored with his wife Revel Hession. The first was Calvary Road, first produced in 1950. This has been continuously in print in English ever since. His last book, Good News For Bad People, was finished in 1989 just hours before he suffered a serious stroke. One or more of Roy's books has been produced in more than 80 languages.

=== Books ===
- Hession, Roy; Hession, Revel (1950). The Calvary Road. Fort Washington, Pennsylvania: Christian Literature Crusade. OCLC 2063749. ASIN 1905044275.
- Hession, Roy (1978). My Calvary road. Grand Rapids: Zondervan. ISBN 978-0-310-26031-8. OCLC 3650216.
- Roy Hession, Forgotten Factors: an aid to deeper repentance of the forgotten factors of sexual misbehavior, Fort Washington, Pa.: Christian Literature Crusade, (1976)
- Roy Hession, Not I, but Christ, Fort Washington, Pa.: Christian Literature Crusade (1980)
- Roy & Revel Hession, We Would See Jesus, Fort Washington, Pa.: Christian Literature Crusade, (1958) (E-text)
- Roy Hession, Be Filled Now, Fort Washington, Pa.: Christian Literature Crusade, (1968?) (E-text)
- Roy Hession, "When I saw Him---" :Where Revival Begins, Fort Washington, Pa.: Christian Literature Crusade, (1975)
- Roy Hession, Our Nearest Kinsman: The Message Of Redemption and Revival in the Book of Ruth, Ft. Washington, Pa.: Christian Literature Crusade, (1976)
- Roy Hession, From Shadow To Substance : The Rediscovery of the Inner Message of the Epistle to the Hebrews centered around the words "Let Us Go On", Grand Rapids: Zondervan Publishing House, (1977)
- Roy Hession, Good News For Bad People, Fort Washington, Pa.: Christian Literature Crusade, (1990)

=== Pamphlets ===
- Roy & Revel Hession, Is Victorious Living Possible? : A Question Asked By All Who Seek A Life Of Power and Harmony, Fort Washington, PA : Christian Literature Crusade, (197-?)

== Notes and references ==
=== Sources ===
- Berubee, Carol (2006). "Thoughts on The Calvary Road" (PDF). Marriage Supper Ministry.
