= List of listed buildings in St Andrews And St Leonards, Fife =

This is a list of listed buildings in the parish of St Andrews and St Leonards in Fife, Scotland.

== List ==
Name	Location	Date listed	Grid ref. (Note: Sometimes known as OSGB36, the grid reference (where provided) is based on the British national grid reference system used by the Ordnance Survey. • "Guide to National Grid". Ordnance Survey. • "Get-a-map". Ordnance Survey.)	Geo-coordinates	Notes	LB number (Note: Historic Environment Scotland assign a unique alphanumeric identifier to each designated site in Scotland, for listed buildings this always begins with "LB", for example "LB12345".)	Image
Strathtyrum Farmhouse				56°20′44″N 2°49′22″W	Category C(S)	15821	Upload Photo
Old House (Converted To Stables And Now Barn) Boarhills Farm, Chesterhill Road				56°19′04″N 2°42′15″W	Category C(S)	15837	Upload Photo
Kenly Green, Sundial				56°18′51″N 2°42′00″W	Category B	15842	Upload Photo
Grange Inn, K6 Telephone Kiosk				56°19′13″N 2°46′48″W	Category B	15847	Upload another image
Lower Strathkinness Road, Carron Lodge, Stable Block, Garden Walls, Gatepiers And Boundary Walls				56°20′02″N 2°50′09″W	Category B	49984	Upload Photo
Craigtoun Park, West Lodge And Gates				56°19′18″N 2°51′18″W	Category C(S)	17440	Upload another image
Edenside House, St Andrews Road				56°21′34″N 2°52′23″W	Category C(S)	15806	Upload Photo
Guardbridge Hotel, St Andrews Road, And Adjoining Pair Of Cottages				56°21′34″N 2°53′14″W	Category B	15807	Upload Photo
Dewar's Mill				56°19′56″N 2°50′42″W	Category C(S)	15812	Upload Photo
Balgove, Gatepiers To House				56°20′37″N 2°50′10″W	Category C(S)	15823	Upload Photo
Kenly Bridge Over Kenly Water And Gatepiers To Kenly Green House				56°18′45″N 2°41′51″W	Category B	19761	Upload Photo
Bridge To Dewar's And Denbrae Mills Over Kinness Burn				56°19′57″N 2°50′39″W	Category C(S)	15814	Upload Photo
Strathtyrum House, Stableblock				56°20′40″N 2°49′38″W	Category B	15819	Upload Photo
Strathtyrum House Mausoleum				56°20′36″N 2°49′21″W	Category B	15820	Upload Photo
Strathtyrum, Gatepiers				56°20′48″N 2°49′13″W	Category B	15822	Upload Photo
Kincaple House				56°21′13″N 2°52′03″W	Category B	15824	Upload Photo
Grange Inn				56°19′14″N 2°46′47″W	Category B	15832	Upload Photo
Gregory's Pillar Scoonie Hill				56°19′03″N 2°47′38″W	Category B	15833	Upload Photo
Boarhills Parish Kirk				56°18′49″N 2°42′35″W	Category C(S)	15835	Upload another image See more images
Sunnybraes, Burnside Road Boarhills				56°18′58″N 2°42′13″W	Category C(S)	15839	Upload Photo
Peekie Inn, Now Known As Peekie Mill				56°18′15″N 2°42′47″W	Category B	15845	Upload Photo
1 Bonfield Road, Strathkinness Including Ancillary Structure, Gate Piers And Boundary Wall				56°20′07″N 2°52′44″W	Category C(S)	49916	Upload Photo
Denbrae Mill				56°19′57″N 2°50′45″W	Category B	19758	Upload Photo
Windward				56°19′44″N 2°50′57″W	Category C(S)	15809	Upload Photo
Denbrae Miller's House				56°19′56″N 2°50′44″W	Category B	15811	Upload Photo
Strathtyrum House, Sundial				56°20′41″N 2°49′37″W	Category C(S)	15818	Upload Photo
Kingask House With Ancillary Building, Link Wall, Boundary Walls And Gatepiers				56°19′15″N 2°44′37″W	Category B	15834	Upload Photo
Kenly Green House				56°18′52″N 2°41′59″W	Category A	15841	Upload Photo
Dewar's Mill Doocot				56°19′54″N 2°50′37″W	Category B	19759	Upload Photo
Grave Of 5 Covenanters, Magus Muir				56°19′31″N 2°52′56″W	Category C(S)	15808	Upload Photo
Denbrae Farm Doocot				56°19′32″N 2°50′52″W	Category B	15810	Upload another image
East Lodge Craigtoun				56°19′33″N 2°50′17″W	Category B	15815	Upload another image
Dewar's Mill, Stables And Outbuildings				56°19′57″N 2°50′42″W	Category C(S)	15813	Upload Photo
Tomb Of Guillan (Or Gullan) Claremont				56°19′13″N 2°52′38″W	Category B	15816	Upload Photo
Strathtyrum House				56°20′41″N 2°49′35″W	Category A	15817	Upload Photo
Burnside Farmhouse				56°18′59″N 2°41′27″W	Category C(S)	15840	Upload Photo
Strathtyrum Lodge				56°20′48″N 2°49′14″W	Category B	19760	Upload Photo
Kincaple House Stables & Coach Houses With Screen Wall Linking To House				56°21′12″N 2°52′02″W	Category C(S)	15825	Upload Photo
Wester Kincaple Farmhouse				56°21′15″N 2°52′31″W	Category B	15826	Upload Photo
Boarhills Doocot				56°19′10″N 2°42′11″W	Category B	15838	Upload another image See more images
Kinkell				56°19′20″N 2°44′46″W	Category C(S)	45801	Upload Photo
Wester Kincaple Steading (Recent Additions Excluded)				56°21′17″N 2°52′36″W	Category C(S)	15805	Upload Photo
Boarhills Parish School, Main Street				56°18′59″N 2°42′21″W	Category B	15836	Upload Photo
Kenly Green, Doocot				56°18′53″N 2°42′08″W	Category B	15843	Upload another image See more images
Standing Stone, Peekie				56°18′38″N 2°43′30″W	Category B	15846	Upload another image See more images
Kinkell Farm Steading				56°19′22″N 2°44′42″W	Category B	45802	Upload Photo
Strathtyrum House, Dovecot				56°20′41″N 2°49′27″W	Category B	51997	Upload Photo
The White House, excluding garage to southwest, 92 Hepburn Gardens, St Andrews				56°20′05″N 2°48′46″W	Category C(S)	52585	Upload Photo

== Key ==
The scheme for classifying buildings in Scotland is:

- Category A: "buildings of national or international importance, either architectural or historic; or fine, little-altered examples of some particular period, style or building type."
- Category B: "buildings of regional or more than local importance; or major examples of some particular period, style or building type, which may have been altered."
- Category C: "buildings of local importance; lesser examples of any period, style, or building type, as originally constructed or moderately altered; and simple traditional buildings which group well with other listed buildings."

In March 2016 there were 47,288 listed buildings in Scotland. Of these, 8% were Category A, and 50% were Category B, with the remaining 42% being Category C.

== See also ==
- List of listed buildings in Fife
