= R. Henderson Bland =

English actor and poet

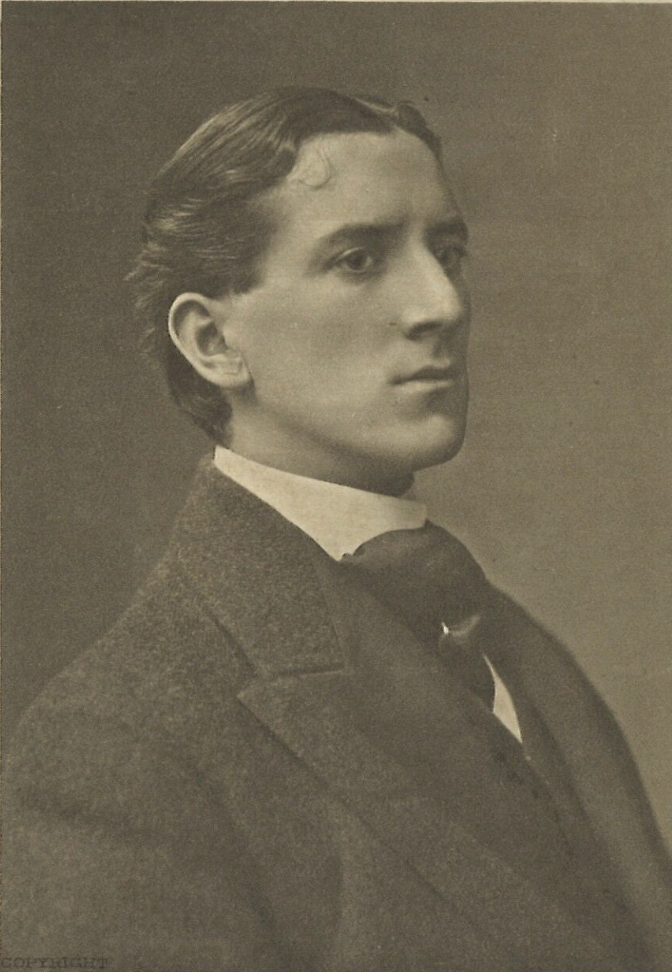
- Bland in 1912
- Born: Robert Henderson Bland; 10 March 1876; Croydon, England
- Died: 20 August 1941 (aged 65); London, England
- Occupations: Actor and poet
- Years active: 1912–1921

Robert Henderson Bland (10 March 1876 – 20 August 1941) was an English film actor and poet. He was active in film between 1912 and 1921, and was the earliest known actor to portray Jesus on screen in the 1912 film From the Manger to the Cross. He was killed during the Blitz on August 20, 1941.

== Personal life ==
Bland served as a captain in the Gloucestershire Regiment during the First World War and was wounded in April 1918, having been deployed to France in July 1916.

== Select filmography ==
- From the Manger to the Cross (1912) - Jesus
- Mr. Gilfil's Love Story (1920) - Maynard Gilfil
- General Post (1920) – Edward Smith
- Gwyneth of the Welsh Hills (1921) – Shadrack Morgan
