= Multichannel audio =

Multichannel audio may refer to:

- Stereophonic sound, namely two channel audio
- Surround sound, more than two channels, with loud speakers in the front, back and sides.
- Ambisonics, or full-sphere surround sound audio.
