= Walton, Aylesbury =

Hamlet in Buckinghamshire, England

Coordinates: 51.810563°N 0.806248°W

Walton
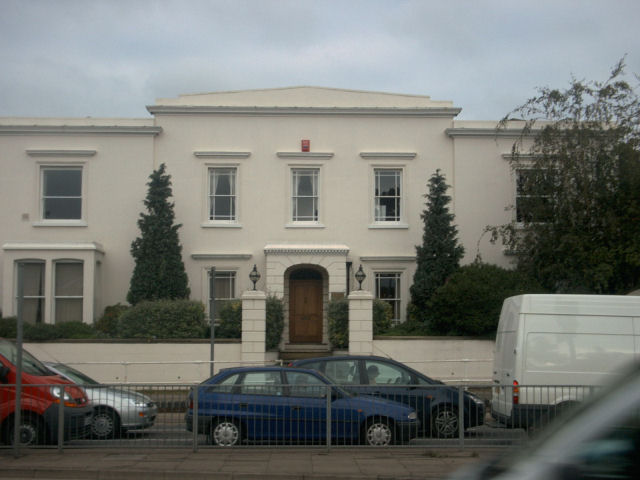
- Walton Lodge, a Grade II Listed building and part of the Georgian Walton Terrace

- Location within Buckinghamshire
- OS grid reference: SP8213
- Civil parish: Aylesbury
- Unitary authority: Buckinghamshire
- Ceremonial county: Buckinghamshire
- Region: South East
- Country: England
- Sovereign state: United Kingdom
- Post town: AYLESBURY
- Postcode district: HP21
- Dialling code: 01296
- Police: Thames Valley
- Fire: Buckinghamshire
- Ambulance: South Central
- UK Parliament: Aylesbury

Walton (perhaps formerly known as Walcot) is a hamlet in the parish of Aylesbury, in Buckinghamshire, England. Although Aylesbury has grown to such an extent that it completely surrounds Walton by a couple of miles in each direction, the hamlet is still marked on modern maps.

Walton sits north of the junction between two major turnpike roads, and was once the location of a toll gate and the toll keeper's cottage. It has also, in its time, been the location of a foundlings hospital and a leper colony.

== History ==
The hamlet name is a common one in England. It is Anglo Saxon in origin and either means Walled Settlement or Settlement of the Walhs, the word 'walh' being an Old English word for Briton. There is evidence that there has been a settlement in Walton since the Roman occupation of England where remains of a Romano-British villa have been found. There were also known to be Saxon houses in the vicinity of Walton in the 5th century.

The manor house in Walton was called Walton Court, and was a wattle and daub structure that was stockaded and moated and situated across the road of what is now Walton Terrace. It was throughout most of its history owned by the Church, and revenue from the manor went to Lincoln Cathedral (it was mentioned in a charter to the cathedral by King William II). It was owned privately for a brief period in the mid 17th century but was subsequently returned to the Church following the restoration of the monarchy in 1660. The principal crop of the manorial farm was rushing used in thatching. The manor should not be confused with Walton Court, the modern housing estate of the same name, which is in a completely different location.

Towards the middle of the 19th century Walton became the local centre for breeding the Aylesbury duck with Walton Pond being a congregating point for many of the local flocks.

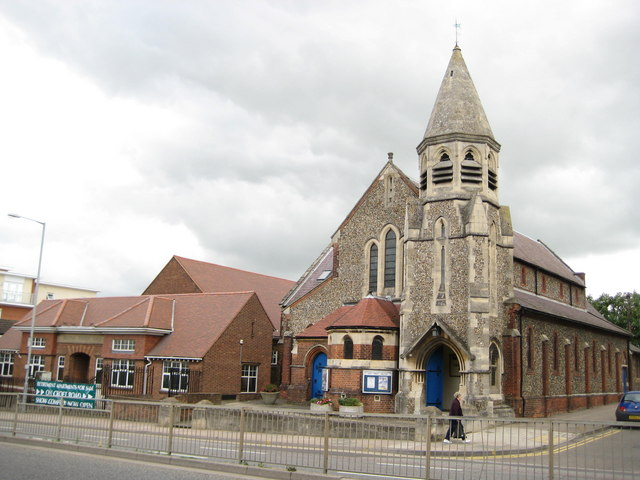
Holy Trinity Church, Walton

The stone-built Holy Trinity Church in Walton opened in 1845 to provide a local place of worship for the farm labourers who lived in the hamlet, and canal workers from the newly built 1814 Aylesbury arm of the Grand Union canal. A hall was built in 1859 next door to the church to start what was to become Walton Holy Trinity National School (now Walton Hall) to support and educate local children. Walton Hall has always been both independent from and also supported by members of Holy Trinity and has been a focus of local community life from its beginnings in 1859. The vicar of Holy Trinity from 1937 to 1949 was the Rev. Brian Hession.

In the Second World War Walton was the landing site of the only bomb to be dropped on Aylesbury by enemy aircraft. The 15-pound bomb destroyed the medieval Walton Grange and severely damaged most of the other houses in Walton. Walton Grange's garden wall still remains though the property now forms part of Aylesbury High School.

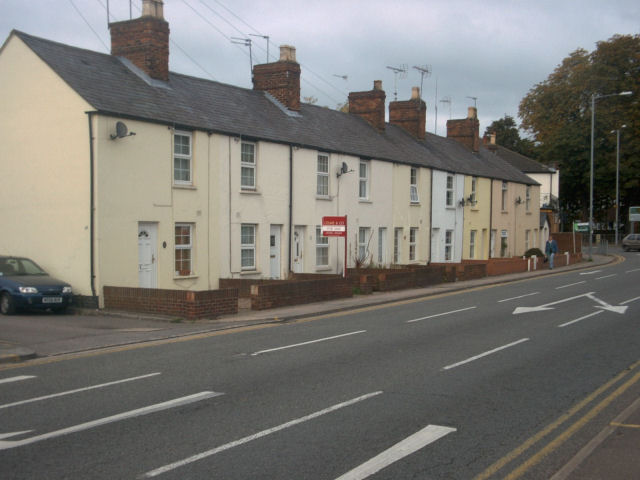
A terrace of housing in Walton

== Modern Walton ==
Today the hamlet keeps a strong identity in the town, with the roads of Walton Street, Walton Road, Walton Grove, Walton Way, Walton Dene and Walton Green all being in the vicinity of the hamlet, and other landmarks such as the Georgian Walton Lodge and the old village pond (Bigg's pond) still remaining. The hamlet is also the location of Aylesbury's Police Station and Aylesbury Grammar School, as well as the aforementioned High School.

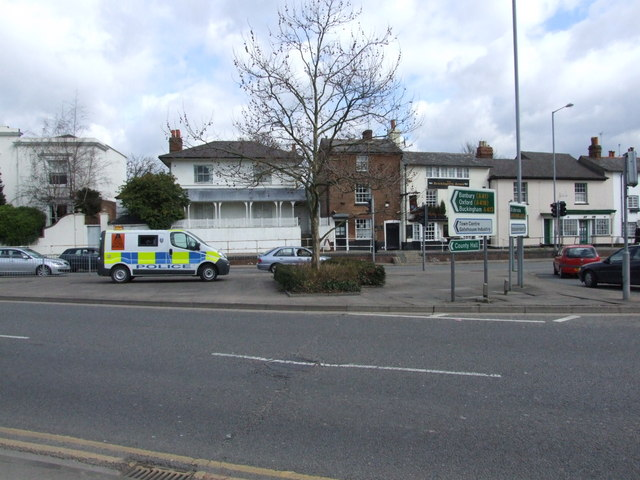
Walton Street showing Walton lodge on the far left and the Bricklayers Arms, centre right.

There are four pubs in the vicinity, The Aristocrat, The Bricklayers Arms, The Broad Leys and The Millwrights. There is currently an Indian Restaurant called Shensha on Stoke Road which was formerly a fifth public house. There was also a public house just outside the area to the south called The Three Pigeons, which was demolished to make way for housing. It was at this public house that the two turnpike roads met originally, before the northern one was rerouted.

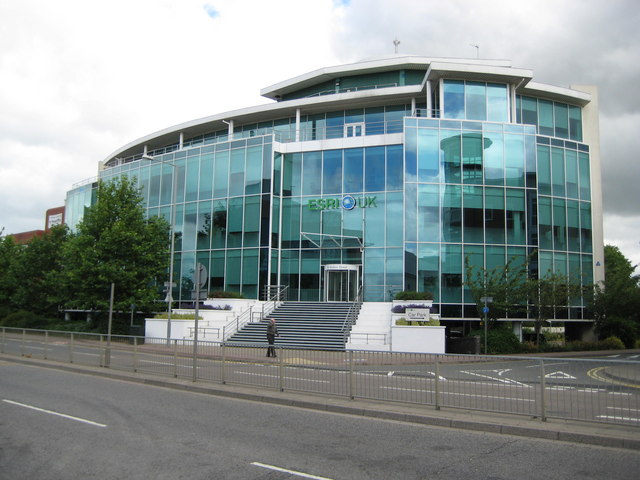
ESRI UK offices, Walton

== William Harding's Charity ==
William Harding (1643 – 1718) was a yeoman from the hamlet of Walton who left a trust in his will to clothe and educate the children of the poor from the local area. The charity was founded after the will was proved in 1719 with the aim of:

- Providing forty shillings a year to buy coats for the poor men and women of Walton
- To select children of poor parents in Aylesbury and Walton to be given apprenticeships
- To clothe those same children

The charity still exists and is managed by the trustees, the clerk of which is a partner of Parrott and Coales LLP Solicitors in Aylesbury. It now makes grants for any educational purpose for young people from the Aylesbury area.

The William Harding Combined School in Elm Farm is named after him.
