= The Cow Puncher's Sweetheart =

- Directed by: Sidney Olcott
- Produced by: Sidney Olcott
- Starring: Gene Gauntier
- Production company: Kalem Company
- Distributed by: General Film Company
- Release date: September 9, 1910
- Running time: 972 ft
- Country: United States
- Languages: Silent film (English intertitles)

The Girl Cow Puncher's Sweetheart is an American silent film, a western produced by Kalem Company and directed by Sidney Olcott with Gene Gauntier in the leading role.

== Cast ==
- Gene Gauntier –
