= Cosmopolitan Productions =

American film company

Cosmopolitan Productions, also often referred to as Cosmopolitan Pictures, was an American film company based in New York City from 1918 to 1923 and Hollywood until 1938.

== History ==
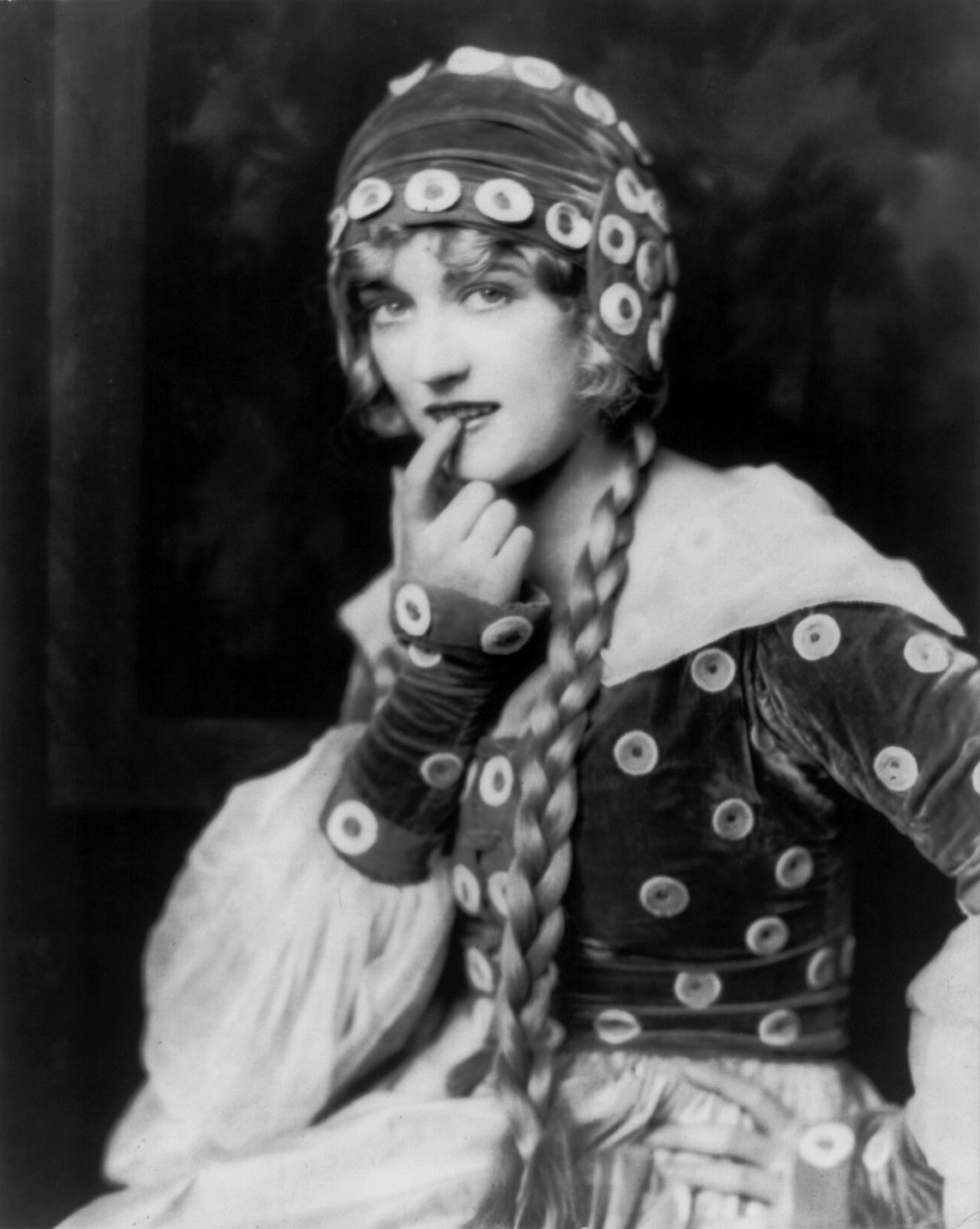
Marion Davies in Yolanda (1924)

Newspaper tycoon William Randolph Hearst formed Cosmopolitan in conjunction with Adolph Zukor of Paramount after Hearst's bid for entry into the motion picture business was rebuffed by United Artists. The advantage of Paramount having a production deal with Cosmopolitan was that they had the film rights to stories that had appeared in the wide variety of Hearst's magazines. These included Cosmopolitan (from which Hearst took the film company's name), as well as Harpers Bazaar, and Good Housekeeping. Thus the stories arrived pre-sold to the public, who were familiar with them through reading them in Hearst's magazines. Hearst's magazines would also advertise and promote his films.

Cosmopolitan's first successful film was Humoresque (1920), which also was the first film to receive the Photoplay Medal of Honor.

For its studio complex, Hearst acquired Sulzer's Harlem River Park and Casino at 126th Street and Second Avenue but a fire on February 18, 1923, destroyed the complex while shooting Little Old New York with Marion Davies, directed by Sidney Olcott. The sets had been designed by Joseph Urban.

Cosmopolitan heavily promoted the career of Hearst's lover, actress Marion Davies. She appeared in 29 silent and 17 talking films with the company.

Due to disagreements with Paramount in the distribution of the Cosmopolitan Pictures in block booking venues, Hearst left Paramount to have his films released by other studios. Starting in 1923, they were distributed or co-produced by Metro-Goldwyn-Mayer until 1934 when a disagreement with Louis B. Mayer over the film Marie Antoinette led Cosmopolitan to go to Warner Bros. Pictures.

== Legacy ==
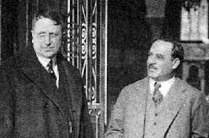
William Randolph Hearst and Robert G. Vignola.

Robert G. Vignola was a director strongly associated with Cosmopolitan Productions. He directed several films there, including the extravagant When Knighthood Was in Flower (1922), which at a cost of $1.8 million, was then the most expensive picture ever made. Director King Vidor made three comedies with Cosmopolitan: Show People (1928), The Patsy (1928) and Not So Dumb (1930), each starring Davies. One film without Davies was The Mask of Fu Manchu (1932, MGM).

Other important directors worked briefly with Cosmopolitan, such as John Ford with Young Mr. Lincoln (released 1939), Michael Curtiz with Captain Blood (released 1936), and Howard Hawks with Ceiling Zero (also in 1936).

== Partial Filmography ==
- Dark Star (1919)
- The Miracle of Love (1919)
- The Cinema Murder (1920)
- April Folly (1920)
- Heliotrope (1920)
- Humoresque (1920)
- The Restless Sex (1920)
- The World and His Wife (1920)
- Buried Treasure (1921)
- Proxies (1921)
- Get-Rich-Quick Wallingford (1921)
- Straight is the Way (1921)
- The Wild Goose (1921)
- The Woman God Changed (1921)
- The Beauty Shop (1922)
- Boomerang Bill (1922)
- The Bride’s Play (1922)
- Beauty’s Worth (1922)
- The Face in the Fog (1922)
- Good Provider (1922)
- The Young Diana (1922)
- Adam and Eva (1923)
- When Knighthood Was in Flower (1923)
- Enemies of Women (1923)
- Little Old New York (1923)
- The Love Piker (1923)
- The Nth Commandment (1923)
- Under the Red Robe (1923)
- Unseeing Eyes (1923)
- Janice Meredith (1924)
- The Great White Way (1924)
- Through the Dark (1924)
- Yolanda (1924)
- Lights of Old Broadway (1925)
- Never the Twain Shall Meet (1925)
- Zander the Great (1925)
- Beverly of Graustark (1926)
- The Flaming Forrest (1926)
- The Temptress (1926)
- Torrent (1926)
- Becky (1927)
- Captain Salvation (1927)
- The Fair Co-Ed (1927)
- The Lovelorn (1927)
- The Red Mill (1927)
- Quality Street (1927)
- Tillie the Toiler (1927)
- The Understanding Heart (1927)
- Bringing Up Father (1928)
- Diamond Handcuffs (1928)
- The Patsy (1928)
- Marianne (1929)
- The Floradora Girl (1930)
- Cain and Mabel (1936)
