= Runaway Romany =

1917 film by George Lederer

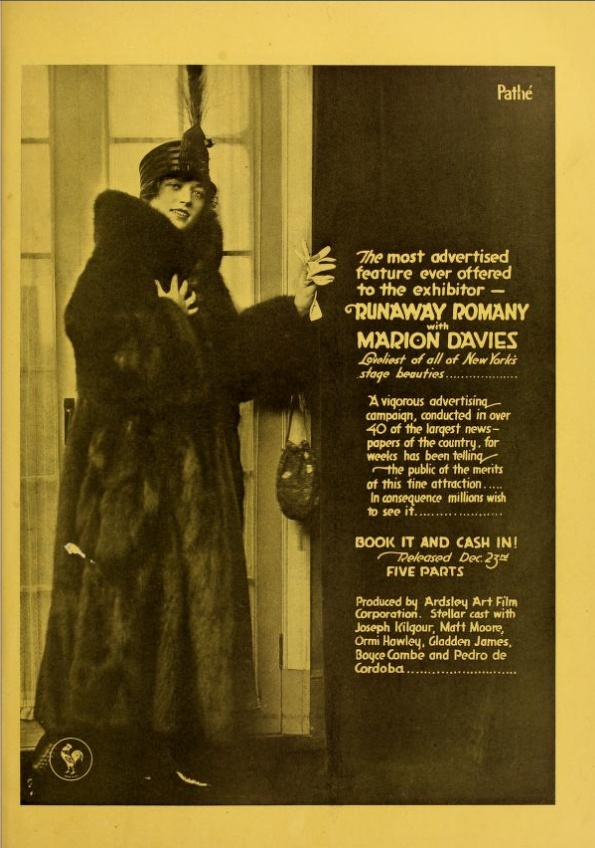
- Directed by: George W. Lederer
- Written by: Marion Davies
- Produced by: George W. Lederer
- Starring: Marion Davies; Joseph Kilgour; Matt Moore
- Production company: Ardsley-Pathé
- Distributed by: Pathé Exchange
- Release date: December 23, 1917
- Country: United States
- Languages: Silent; English intertitles

Runaway Romany is a 1917 American silent drama film directed by George W. Lederer and starring Marion Davies, Joseph Kilgour, and Matt Moore.

Written by Davies herself, the film was given a three-month publicity campaign before its release. However critics felt that the film's dramatic storyline didn't showcase Davies as well as her Broadway comedy roles.

== Cast ==
- Marion Davies as Romany
- Joseph Kilgour as Theodore True
- Matt Moore as Bud Haskell
- W.W. Bitner as Zelaya, Chief of the Gypsies
- Boyce Combe as Hobart
- Pedro de Cordoba as Zinga
- Ormi Hawley as Anitra St. Clair
- Gladden James as 'Inky' Ames

== Bibliography ==
- Richard Lewis Ward. When the Cock Crows: A History of the Pathé Exchange. SIU Press, 2016.
