= The Black Hand (1906 film) =

- PLAY film; runtime 00:10:46.
- Directed by: Wallace McCutcheon
- Starring: Anthony O'Sullivan; Robert G. Vignola
- Production company: Biograph Company
- Release date: March 29, 1906
- Running time: 11 minutes
- Country: United States
- Language: Silent film

The Black Hand (full title The Black Hand: True Story of a Recent Occurrence in the Italian Quarter of New York) is an American silent film directed by Wallace McCutcheon. It is generally considered by motion-picture historians to be the earliest surviving gangster film.

== Plot summary ==
In New York City, two Italian-American criminals blackmail Angelo, a friendly butcher, demanding a ransom of $1,000 otherwise they threaten to kidnap the butcher’s daughter, Maria, and blow up his shop if he refuses to pay the ransom.

After the gang then kidnap Maria and take her back to their hideout in exchange for the ransom, Angelo and his wife cooperate with the police. The detectives first apprehend one of the gangsters when he comes to collect the $1,000 ransom. The police then arrest rest of the extortionists back at their hideout and rescue the Maria.

== Cast ==
- Anthony O'Sullivan and Robert G. Vignola as the extortionists.

== Analysis ==
The film is composed of eight shots organised in six scenes introduced by intertitles. It uses continuity editing and cross-cutting.

1. Writing the letter. Indoors. Stage set of the bandits' hideout. Medium shot of the two bandits drinking wine sitting at a table, one of them writing a letter. The shot is interrupted by an insert of the letter.

2. The letter received. Indoors, full shot of the stage set of Angelo's shop, with a walk-in fridge to the right. After putting some meat in the fridge and serving a customer, Angelo receives a letter. He reads it aloud to his wife and daughter, then puts on his coat and hat and leaves.

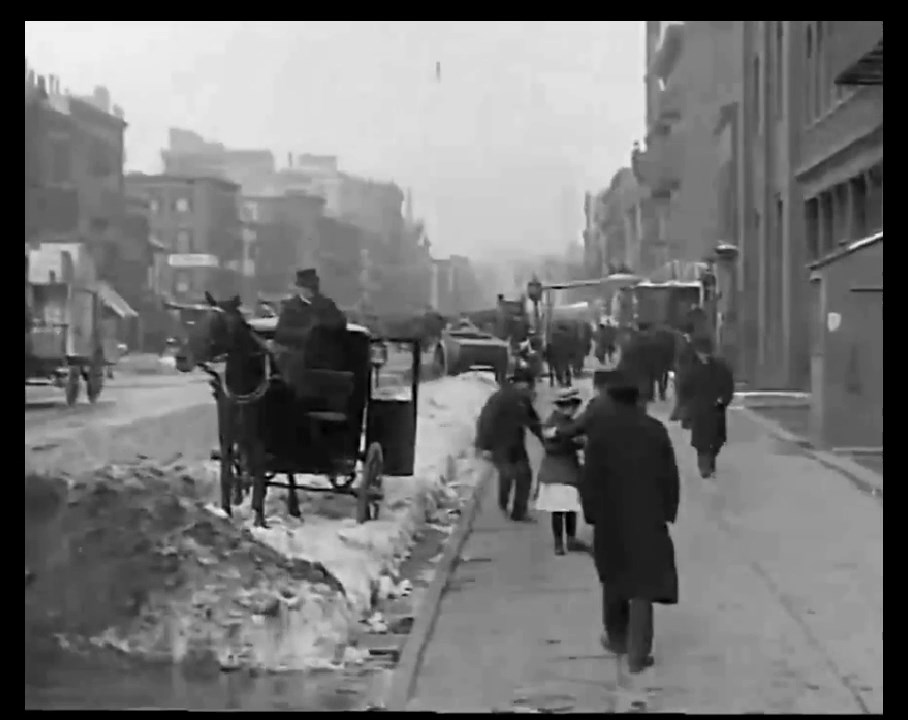
The threat carried out

3. The threat carried out. Two outdoors shots. Long shot of the 7th Avenue in New-York with snow on the sides and various pedestrians and horse carriages. One of the gangsters seen in scene 1 walks towards the camera and stops, looking for something on the ground. Maria appears in the distance and walks towards him. He asks her to help him look for something. As she is busy helping him look, a carriage stops. The man alights and is helped by the other gangster in catching the girl to take her inside the carriage which then leaves hastily.

Another long shot of 7th Avenue. The carriage stops in front of a junk shop. The two men carry the girl inside. The camera pans slightly left to follow them.

4. The gang's headquarters. Indoors. Full shot of the set seen in scene 1, with the table moved to the right. One of the gangsters is lying on a bed. He gets up and opens the door. A woman enters followed by the two gangsters and Maria. The woman brutally removes Maria's coat and hat, forcing Maria to lie down on the bed before leaving. While the three men play cards and drink, Maria tries to escape but she is caught and one of the men threatens to hit her.

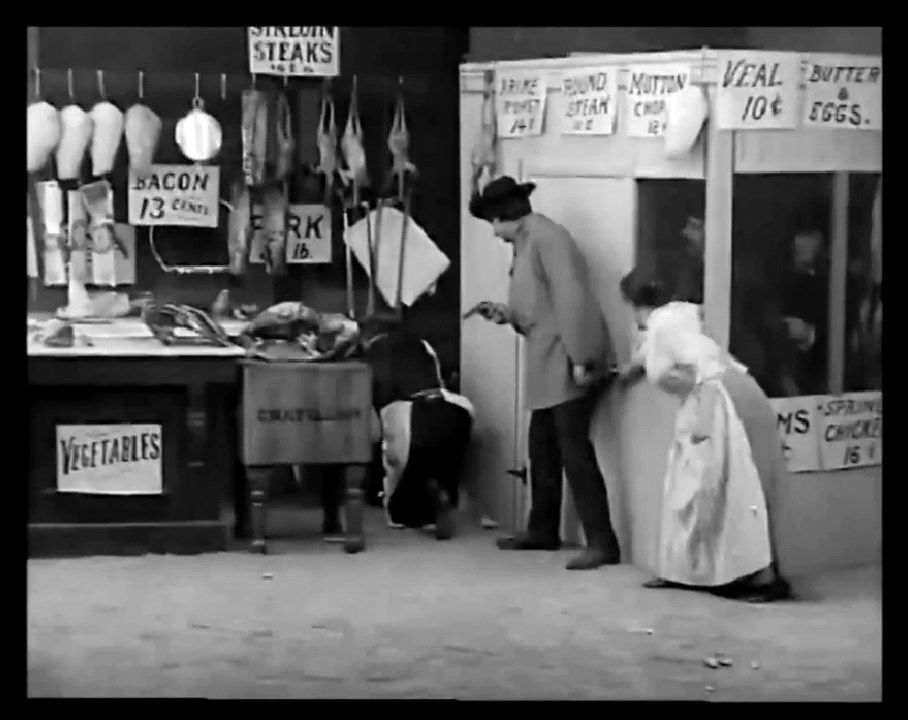
Levying the blackmail

5. Levying the blackmail. A clever arrest is made by the New York Detectives. Same set as scene 2. Two policemen visit Angelo's shop and check if they can hide in the walk-in fridge. A comedic touch is added when they come out of it feeling very cold. When the gangster comes to collect the ransom, the butcher's wife opens the door of the walk-in fridge, the two policemen come out and arrest the gangster.

6. Rescue of Maria. Same view as scene 4. Maria is lying on the bed while the two gangsters are playing cards and drinking. A note is passed to Maria through the shutter of the window. Maria then discretely unlocks the shutter and the door. Then, three policemen crash in and overpower the gangsters. Maria is reunited with her parents.
