= Marion Davies =

American actress (1897–1961)

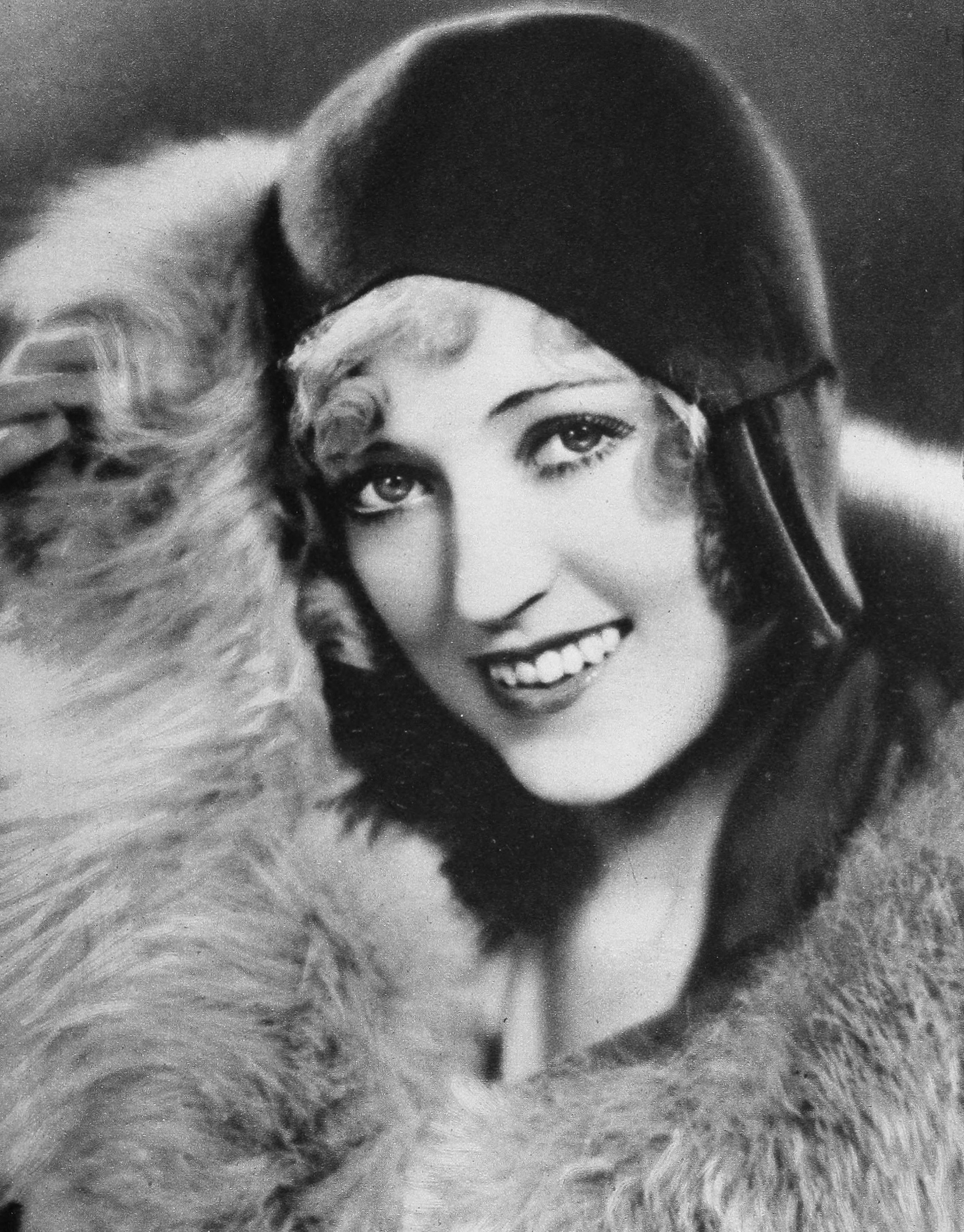
- Davies in the 1920s
- Born: Marion Cecilia Douras (Note: The name is sometimes spelled "Marion Cecilia Dourvas" in biographies. In her autobiography, it is spelled "Douras", as it appears in the 1900 U.S. census when they lived in Brooklyn, New York.); January 3, 1897; Brooklyn, New York, U.S.
- Died: September 22, 1961 (aged 64); Los Angeles, California, U.S.
- Resting place: Hollywood Forever Cemetery
- Occupations: Actress; producer; screenwriter; philanthropist
- Years active: 1914–1937
- Spouse: Horace G. Brown (m. 1951)
- Partner: William Randolph Hearst (1917–1951; his death)
- Children: Patricia Lake (acknowledged at Lake's death)
- Relatives: Rosemary Davies (sister); Reine Davies (sister); Charles Lederer (nephew); Pepi Lederer (niece)

Marion Davies (born Marion Cecilia Douras; January 3, 1897 – September 22, 1961) was an American actress, producer, screenwriter, and philanthropist. Educated in a religious convent, Davies left the school to pursue a career as a chorus girl. As a teenager, she appeared in several Broadway musicals and one film, Runaway Romany (1917). She soon became a featured performer in the Ziegfeld Follies. While performing in the 1916 Follies, the nineteen-year-old Marion met the fifty-three-year-old newspaper tycoon William Randolph Hearst and became his mistress. Hearst took over management of Davies's career and promoted her as a film actress.

Hearst financed Davies’s pictures and promoted her career extensively in his newspapers and Hearst newsreels. He founded Cosmopolitan Pictures to produce her films. By 1924, Davies ranked as the top female box office star in Hollywood because of the popularity of When Knighthood Was in Flower and Little Old New York, two of the biggest box-office hits of their respective years. During the zenith of the Jazz Age, Davies became renowned as the hostess of lavish soirees for Hollywood actors and political elites. In 1924, her name became linked with scandal when film producer Thomas Ince died at a party aboard Hearst's yacht.

Following the decline of her film career during the Great Depression, Davies struggled with alcoholism. She retired from the screen in 1937 to devote herself to an ailing Hearst and charitable work. In Hearst's declining years, Davies remained his steadfast companion until his death in 1951. Eleven weeks after Hearst's death, she married sea captain Horace Brown. Their marriage lasted until Davies's death at 64 from malignant osteomyelitis (bone cancer) of the jaw in 1961.

By the time of her death, her popular association with the character of Susan Alexander Kane in the film Citizen Kane (1941) overshadowed Davies's legacy as a talented actress. Many viewers assumed Davies inspired the title character's second wife—an attractive but untalented singer whom he tries to promote. However, many commentators, including writer–director Orson Welles, defended Davies's record as a gifted actress and comedienne to whom Hearst's patronage did more harm than good. In his final years, Welles attempted to correct the widespread misconceptions the film had created about Davies's popularity and talents as an actress.

== Early life and education ==
Marion Cecilia Douras was born on January 3, 1897, in Brooklyn, the youngest of five children born to Bernard J. Douras, a lawyer and judge in New York City, and Rose Reilly. Her father performed the civil marriage of socialite Gloria Gould Bishop. She had three older sisters, Ethel, Rose, and Reine. An older brother, Charles, drowned. His name was subsequently given to Davies's nephew, screenwriter Charles Lederer, the son of Davies's sister Reine Davies.

The Douras family lived near Prospect Park in Brooklyn. Educated in the Sacred Heart religious convent near the Hudson River and later a religious convent near Tours, France, Davies was uninterested in her academic studies and very unhappy as a child supervised by Catholic nuns. Her family was close friends with architect Stanford White, and Davies grew up learning about the Evelyn Nesbit sex scandal.

Davies struggled with her stutter as a child and convinced her mother to let her leave school early due to the torment of her classmates and teachers. As a teenager, Marion left school to pursue a career as a showgirl. When her sister Reine adopted the stage name of Davies after seeing a real estate billboard advertisement, Marion followed suit.

== Career ==
=== Early career on stage and in film ===
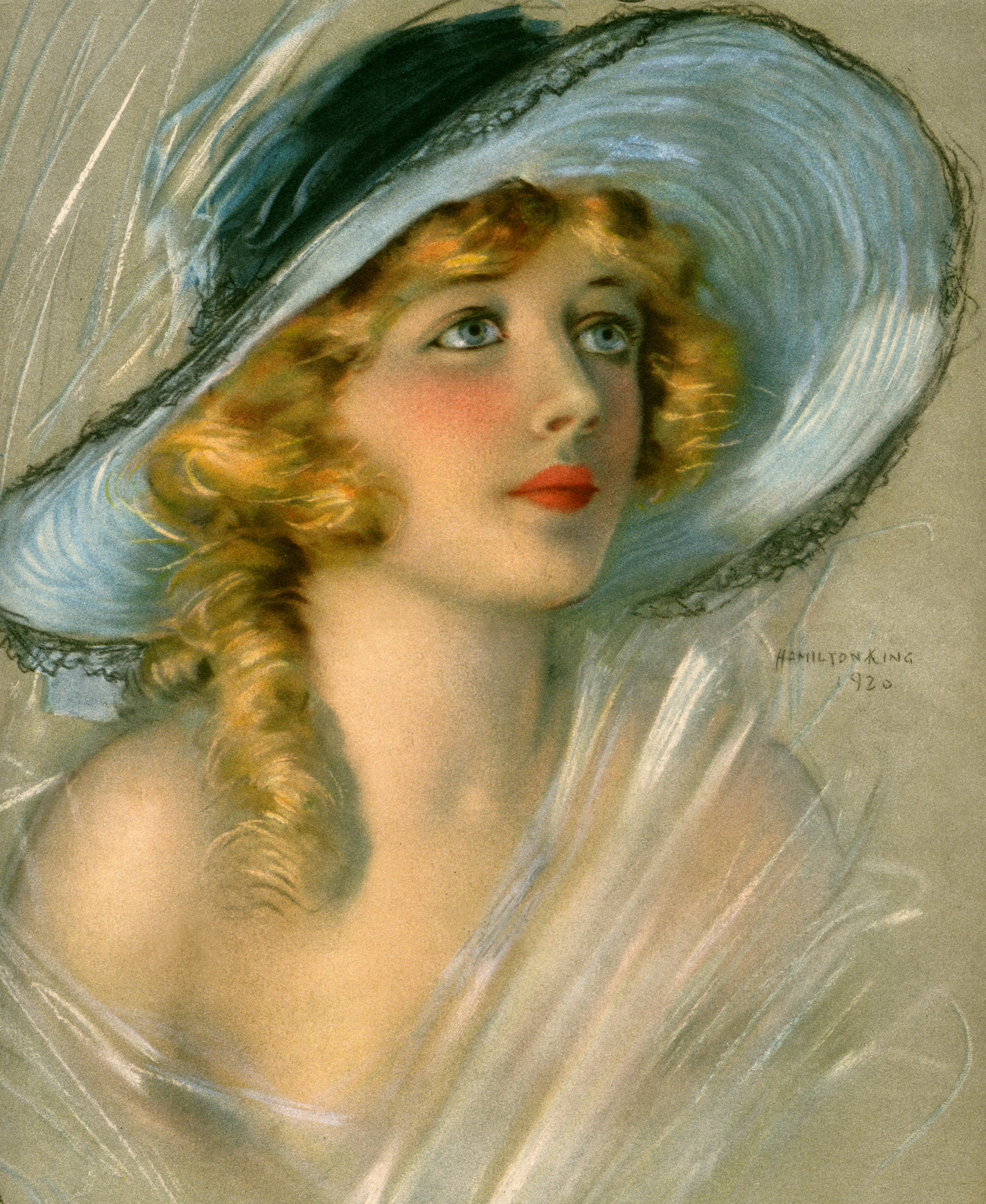
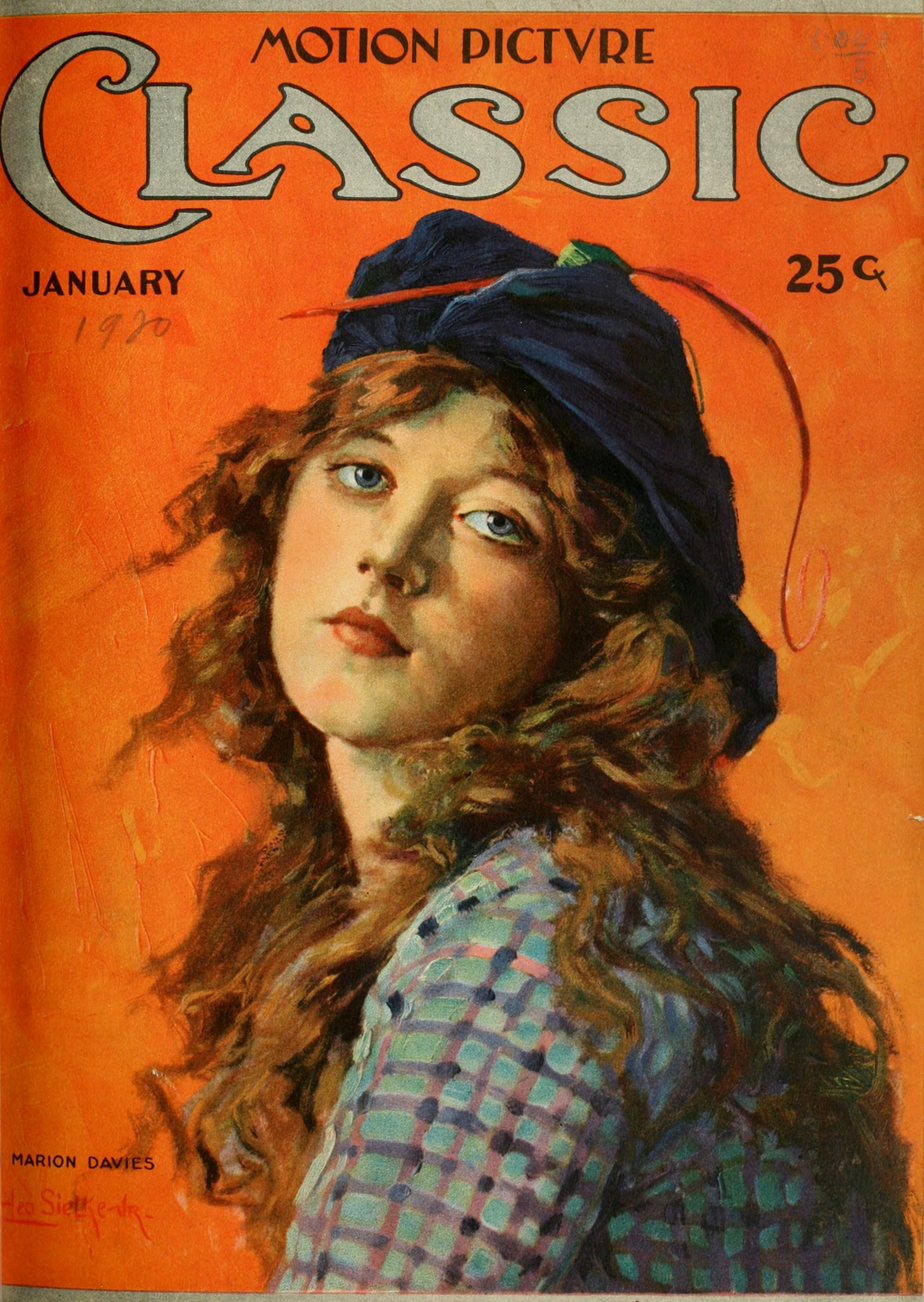
Portraits of Davies appeared on covers for Theatre Magazine (June 1920) and Motion Picture Classic (January 1920)

Davies worked as a chorus line dancer starting with Chin-Chin, a 1914 musical starring David C. Montgomery and Fred Stone, at the old Forrest Theatre in Philadelphia. She made her Broadway debut starring in the show at the Globe Theatre on October 20. She also appeared in Nobody Home, Miss Information and Stop, Look and Listen. When not dancing, she modeled for illustrators Harrison Fisher and Howard Chandler Christy.

In 1916, the Ziegfeld Follies signed Davies as a featured player. Due to a persistent stammer, she struggled as a Ziegfeld girl, as she could not deliver her lines. Consequently, Florenz Ziegfeld relegated her to dancing routines. While working for Ziegfeld, a cavalcade of admirers pursued her sexually. She came to loathe young college men: "The stage-door-Johnnies [sic] I didn't like. Especially those who came from Yale." During one infamous show starring Gaby Deslys, rowdy undergraduates from Yale pelted Davies and other chorus dancers with tomatoes and rotten eggs to show their displeasure with the performance.

While dancing in the Follies at the New Amsterdam Theatre in New York City, the teenage Davies was first observed by newspaper tycoon William Randolph Hearst, who was seated in the front row of the audience. Recalling this first encounter, Davies indicated she was afraid of Hearst initially:

[Hearst] always sat in the front row at the Follies. The girls in the show told me who he was. They said 'Look out for him—he's looking at you. He's a wolf in sheep's clothing'...He sent me flowers and little gifts, like silver boxes or gloves or candy. I wasn't the only one he sent gifts to, but all the girls thought he was particularly looking at me, and the older ones would say 'Look out'.

Hearst purportedly went to the Follies show every night for eight weeks solely to gaze at Davies. Without Davies's knowledge, Hearst clandestinely arranged for an intermediary from Campbell's Studio to invite her to be photographed in ornate costumes such as a Japanese geisha and a virginal bride. While the photos were being taken, Davies realized Hearst secretly was present in the darkness of the photography studio. Terrified, she fled to the dressing room and locked the door. Hearst abruptly departed without introducing himself. After several months, they met again in Palm Beach, Florida, but Hearst's wife Millicent Hearst was present. They did not become intimate until sometime later.

After making her screen debut in 1916 and modeling gowns by Lady Duff-Gordon in a fashion newsreel, Davies appeared in Runaway Romany (1917), her first feature film. Davies wrote the film, which was directed by her brother-in-law, producer George W. Lederer. She continued to alternate between stage and screen until 1920 when she made her last revue appearance in Ed Wynn's Carnival.

=== Hearst and Cosmopolitan Pictures ===
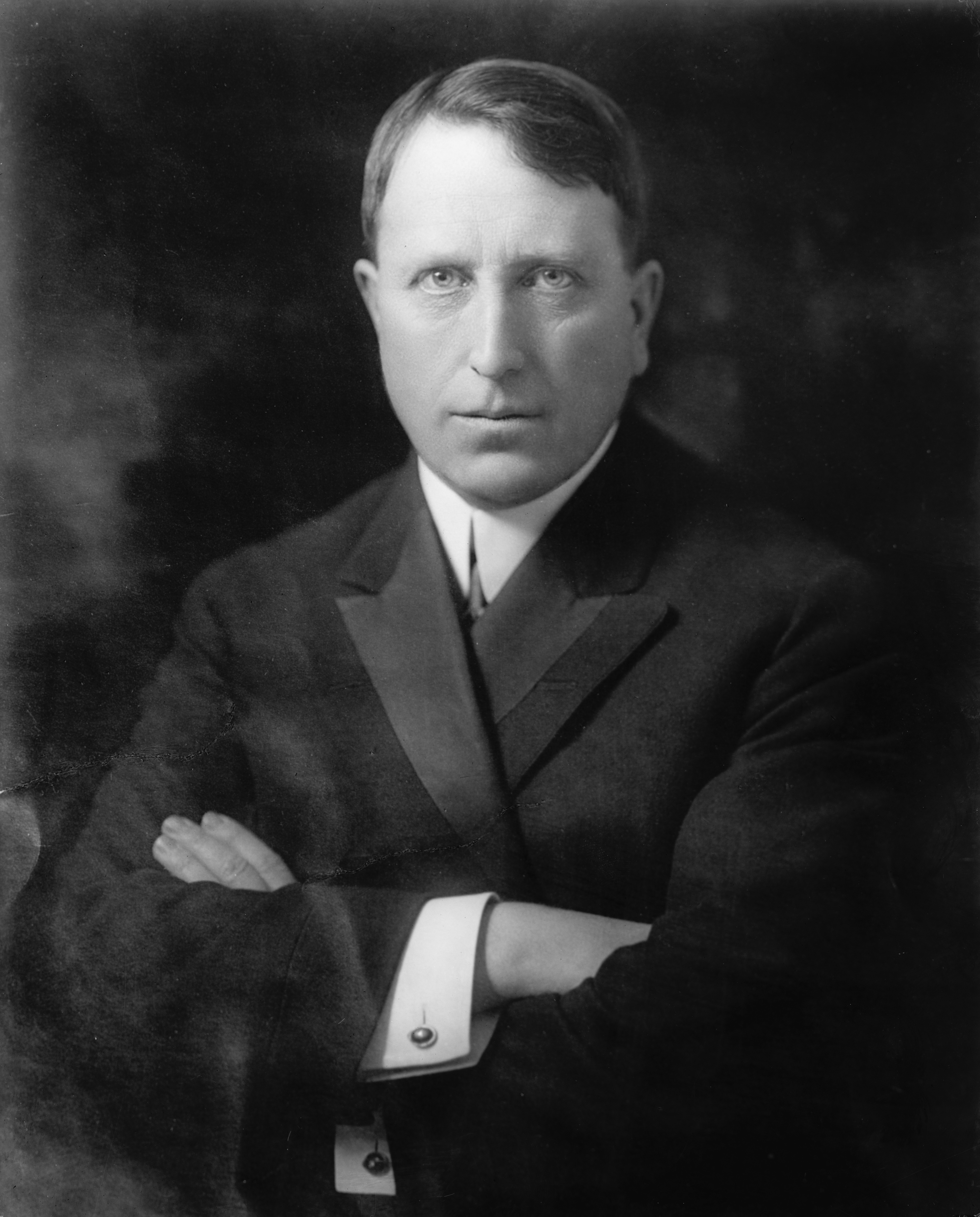
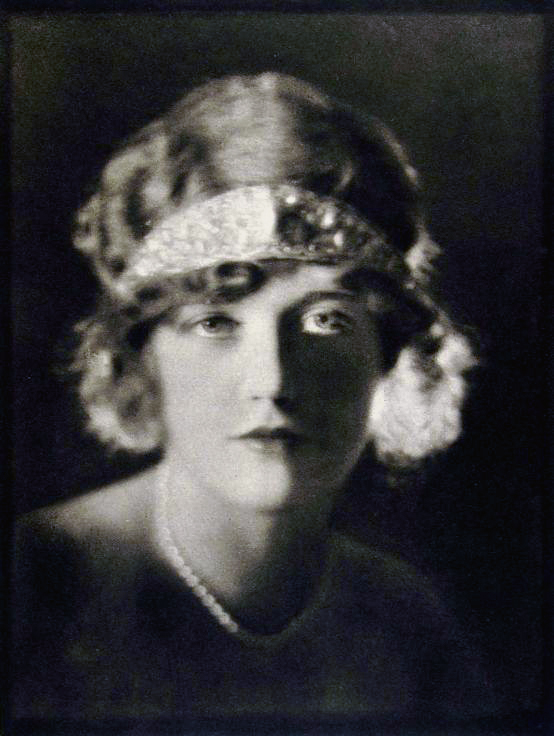
William Randolph Hearst circa 1910s (left) and a 1922 photograph of Davies by E. O. Hoppé (right). By the mid-1920s, Davies's career was overshadowed by her relationship with Hearst and their social life at San Simeon and Ocean House in Santa Monica.

In 1918, Hearst formed Cosmopolitan Pictures and asked Davies to sign an exclusive contract for $500 per week. After she signed, 21-year-old Davies and 58-year-old Hearst began a sexual relationship. Using his vast newspaper empire and Hearst Metrotone Newsreels, Hearst decided to promote Davies on an enormous scale. His newsreels touted her social activities, and a reporter from the Los Angeles Examiner was assigned the full-time job of recounting Davies's daily exploits in print. Hearst expended an estimated $7 million on promoting Davies's career (equivalent to $156,770,833 in 2025).

Soon after, Hearst—who was still married to Millicent Hearst—moved Davies with her mother and sisters into an elegant Manhattan townhouse at 331 Riverside Drive, at the corner of Riverside Drive and W. 105th Street. Hearst ensured that "Marion's new abode was nothing less than a palace fit for a movie-queen—especially since the queen would frequently be receiving the press on the premises." Cecilia of the Pink Roses in 1918 was her first film, backed by Hearst. He next secured Cosmopolitan's distribution deals, first with Paramount Pictures, then with Samuel Goldwyn Productions, and with Metro-Goldwyn-Mayer.

Over the next ten years, Davies appeared in 29 films, an average of almost three per year. One of her best known roles was as Mary Tudor in When Knighthood Was in Flower (1922), directed by Robert G. Vignola, with whom she collaborated on several films. The 1922–23 period may have been her most successful as an actress, with both When Knighthood Was in Flower and Little Old New York ranking among the top three box-office hits of those years. Theater owners named her the number one female box-office star and crowned her "Queen of the Screen" at their 1924 Hollywood convention. Other hit silent films included: Beverly of Graustark, The Cardboard Lover, Enchantment, The Bride's Play, Lights of Old Broadway, Zander the Great, The Red Mill, Yolanda, Beauty's Worth, and The Restless Sex.

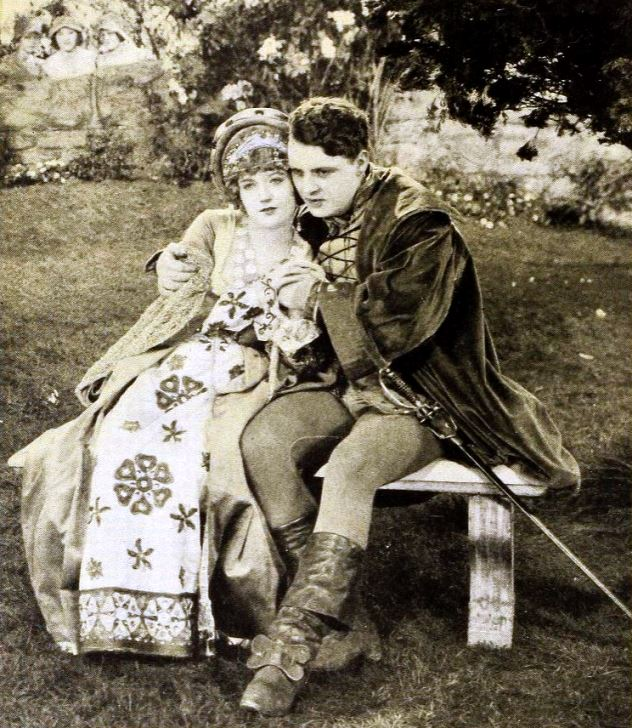
Davies and Forrest Stanley in When Knighthood Was in Flower (1922).

In 1926, Hearst's wife Millicent Hearst moved to New York, and Hearst and Davies moved to the palatial Hearst Castle in San Simeon, California, overlooking the Pacific Ocean. Upon visiting the sprawling Hearst Castle with its Greek statues and celestial suites, playwright George Bernard Shaw reportedly quipped: "This is what God would have built if he had the money." When not holding court at San Simeon, Hearst and Davies resided at Marion's equally luxurious beach house in Santa Monica, at Hearst's rustic Wyntoon estate in Northern California, and St Donat's Castle in Wales. During the heyday of the Jazz Age, the couple spent much of their time entertaining and holding extravagant soirees with famous guests, including many Hollywood actors and political figures. Frequent habitues and occasional visitors included Charlie Chaplin, Douglas Fairbanks, Harpo Marx, Clark Gable, Calvin Coolidge, Winston Churchill, Charles Lindbergh, and Amelia Earhart, among others.

Over the years, Hearst's relentless efforts to promote Davies's career purportedly had a detrimental effect. According to Davies, Hearst grandiosely advertised her latest films with "signs all over New York City and pictures in the papers ... I thought it got to be a little too much." Such unceasing publicity irritated the public. "In New York city there were big signs, blocks and blocks of signs," Davies recalled, "and people got so tired of the name Marion Davies that they would actually insult me." In her published memoirs The Times We Had, Davies concluded that such over-the-top promotion of her film career likely did more harm than good.

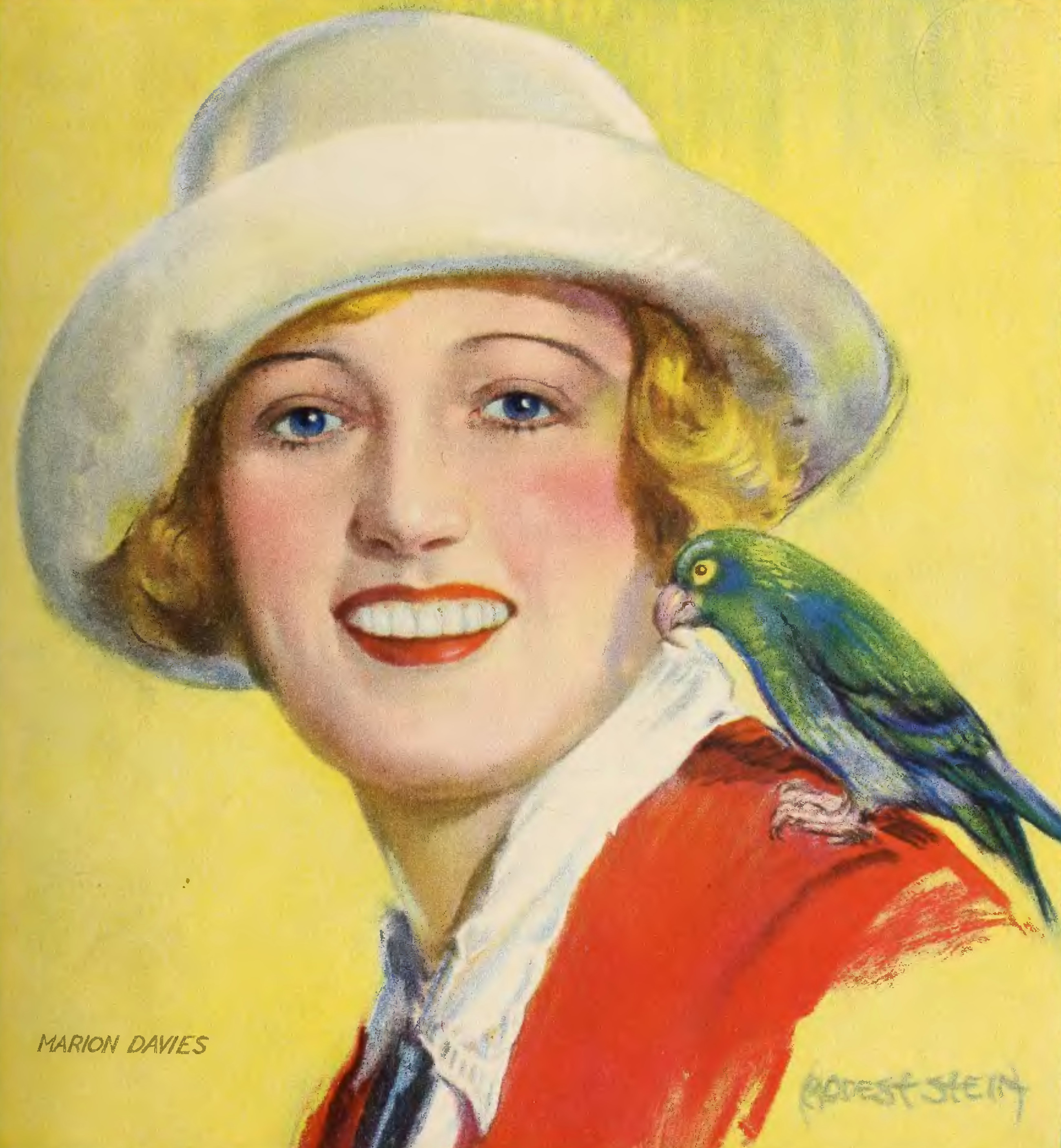
Marion Davies cover art from Picture-Play Magazine, 1926

Hearst's jealousy also interfered with Davies's career, especially in her earlier films and her stage roles. According to Davies, he often vetoed the casting of attractive leading men and typically would not permit her to be embraced on the screen or in stage plays. In her memoirs, Davies claimed to have repeatedly assailed Hearst's jealous stewardship in vain: "Everyone has to do a little embrace in pictures, just for the audience's sake," she told him. Hearst would not relent. Consequently, many of her earlier pictures were regarded as sexless and featured "no kissing at all" (Note: Hearst's ban on Davies kissing her leading men in films purportedly ended with Marianne in 1929.) even when a kiss was needed for a happy ending. Hearst insisted on personally rewriting Davies's film scripts, and his constant meddling often exasperated film directors such as Lloyd Bacon.

Hearst further hindered Davies's career by insisting she star only in costume dramas in which she often played "a doll-sweetheart out of the 1890s, in the manner of D. W. Griffith heroines". Davies herself was more inclined to develop her comic talents alongside her friends Charlie Chaplin and Mary Pickford at United Artists, but Hearst pointedly discouraged this. He preferred seeing her in expensive historical pictures, but she also appeared in contemporary comedies like Tillie the Toiler, The Fair Co-Ed (both 1927), and especially three directed by King Vidor, Not So Dumb (1930), The Patsy and the backstage-in-Hollywood saga Show People (both 1928). The Patsy contains her imitations, which she usually did for friends, of silent stars Lillian Gish, Mae Murray and Pola Negri. Vidor saw Davies as a comedic actress rather than the dramatic actress Hearst wanted her to be. He noticed she was the life of parties and incorporated that into his films.

=== Sound films and career decline ===
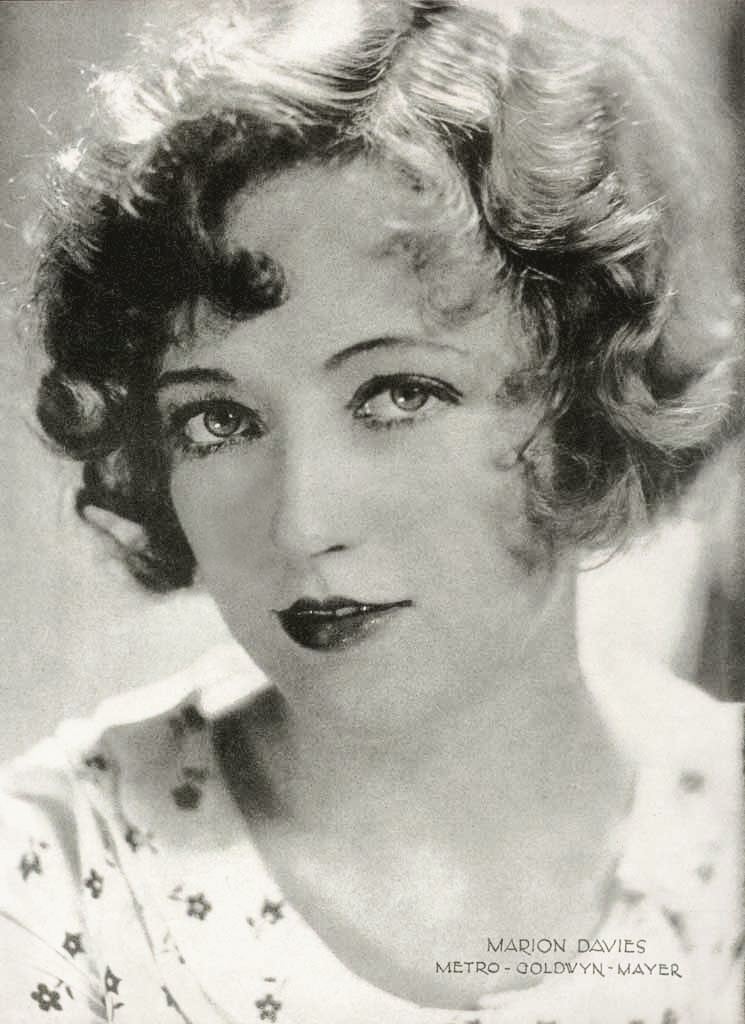
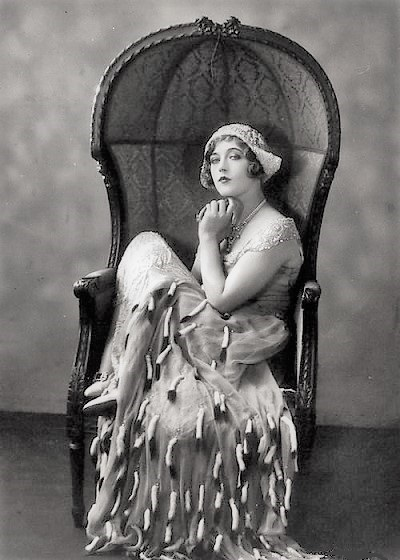
Davies circa 1930–32 (left) and in a studio photograph from the late 1920s (right)

The coming of sound made Davies nervous because of her persistent stutter. Her career progressed, nonetheless, and she made a number of films during the early sound era, including Marianne (1929), The Hollywood Revue of 1929 (1929), The Florodora Girl (1930), The Bachelor Father (1931), Five and Ten (1931) with Leslie Howard, Polly of the Circus (1932) with Clark Gable, Blondie of the Follies (1932), Peg o' My Heart (1933), Going Hollywood (1933) with Bing Crosby, and Operator 13 (1934) with Gary Cooper. During the filming of Operator 13, Hearst repeatedly caused problems on the set and insisted on directing a scene, much to film director Richard Boleslawski's consternation.

Several of Davies's early sound films were musicals, and she sang and danced frenetically in the all-star revue The Hollywood Revue of 1929. Her musical talents were modest, but her personality and abilities as a light comedian meant she was always watchable.

An astute businesswoman, Davies often oversaw many aspects of her films at Metro-Goldwyn-Mayer. However, Hearst's insistence that she play dramatic historical parts, rather than the comic roles that were her forte, continued to hamper her career. Hearst reportedly tried to persuade MGM production boss Irving Thalberg to cast Davies in the coveted title role of the 1938 historical drama Marie Antoinette, but Thalberg awarded the part to his ambitious wife, Norma Shearer. This rejection followed a previous one where Davies had been denied the female lead in The Barretts of Wimpole Street, which went to Shearer as well. Despite Davies's friendship with the Thalbergs, Hearst reacted angrily by pulling his newspaper support for MGM and moving Davies and Cosmopolitan Pictures' distribution to Warner Brothers.

Davies's first film at Warner Brothers was Page Miss Glory (1935). During this period, a personal tragedy occurred in Davies's own life with the death of her vivacious 25-year-old niece, Pepi Lederer. Pepi had been a permanent resident at San Simeon for many years. She was a closeted lesbian who had sexual relationships with actresses Louise Brooks, Nina Mae McKinney, and others. At some point during the affair between Pepi and Brooks, Hearst became cognizant of Lederer's lesbianism. According to Louise Brooks's memoirs, to avoid a public scandal or to forestall blackmail, Hearst arranged for Pepi to be committed to a mental institution for her drug addiction. In June 1935, mere days after her institutionalization, Pepi committed suicide by leaping to her death from an upper-floor window of the Good Samaritan Hospital in Los Angeles. Hearst purportedly used his press influence to have Pepi's death obscured in the news cycle, and Davies arranged a funeral for her niece at a private chapel.

After a brief hiatus because of her niece's suicide, Davies starred in Hearts Divided (1936) and Cain and Mabel (1936). Her final film for Warner Brothers was Ever Since Eve (1937). Mirroring earlier events at MGM, Warner Brothers purchased the rights to Robert E. Sherwood's 1935 play Tovarich for Davies, but the lead role in the 1937 film adaptation was given to Claudette Colbert. Hearst shopped Davies and Cosmopolitan for another year, but no deals were made, and the actress officially retired. In 1943, Davies was offered the role of Mrs. Brown in Claudia, but Hearst dissuaded her from taking a supporting role and tarnishing her starring career. In her 45 feature films, over a 20-year period, Davies had never been anything but the star and, except for uncredited cameo appearances, had always received top billing.

== Personal life ==
=== Relationship with Hearst ===
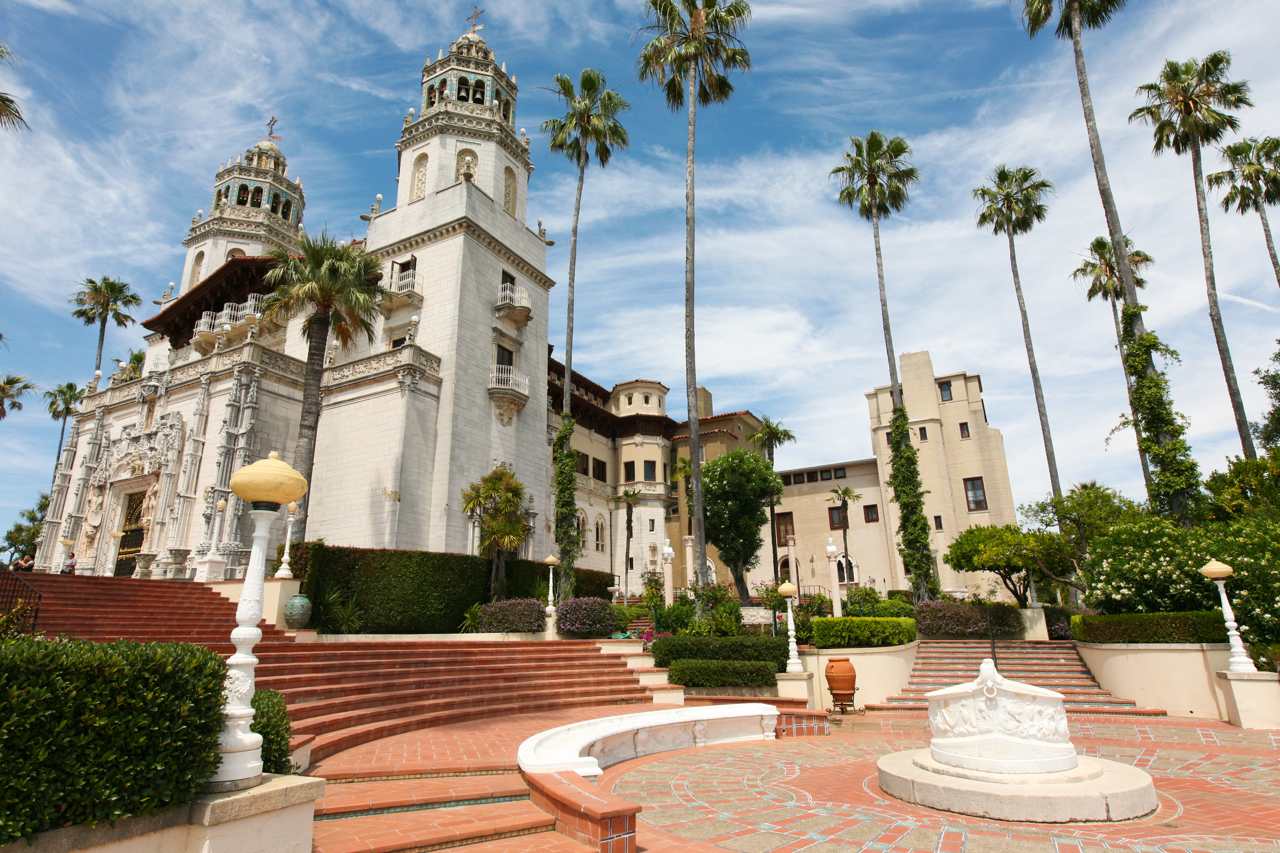
During the Jazz Age, Hearst and Davies were known for the extravagant soirées they threw for Hollywood and political elites at Hearst Castle.

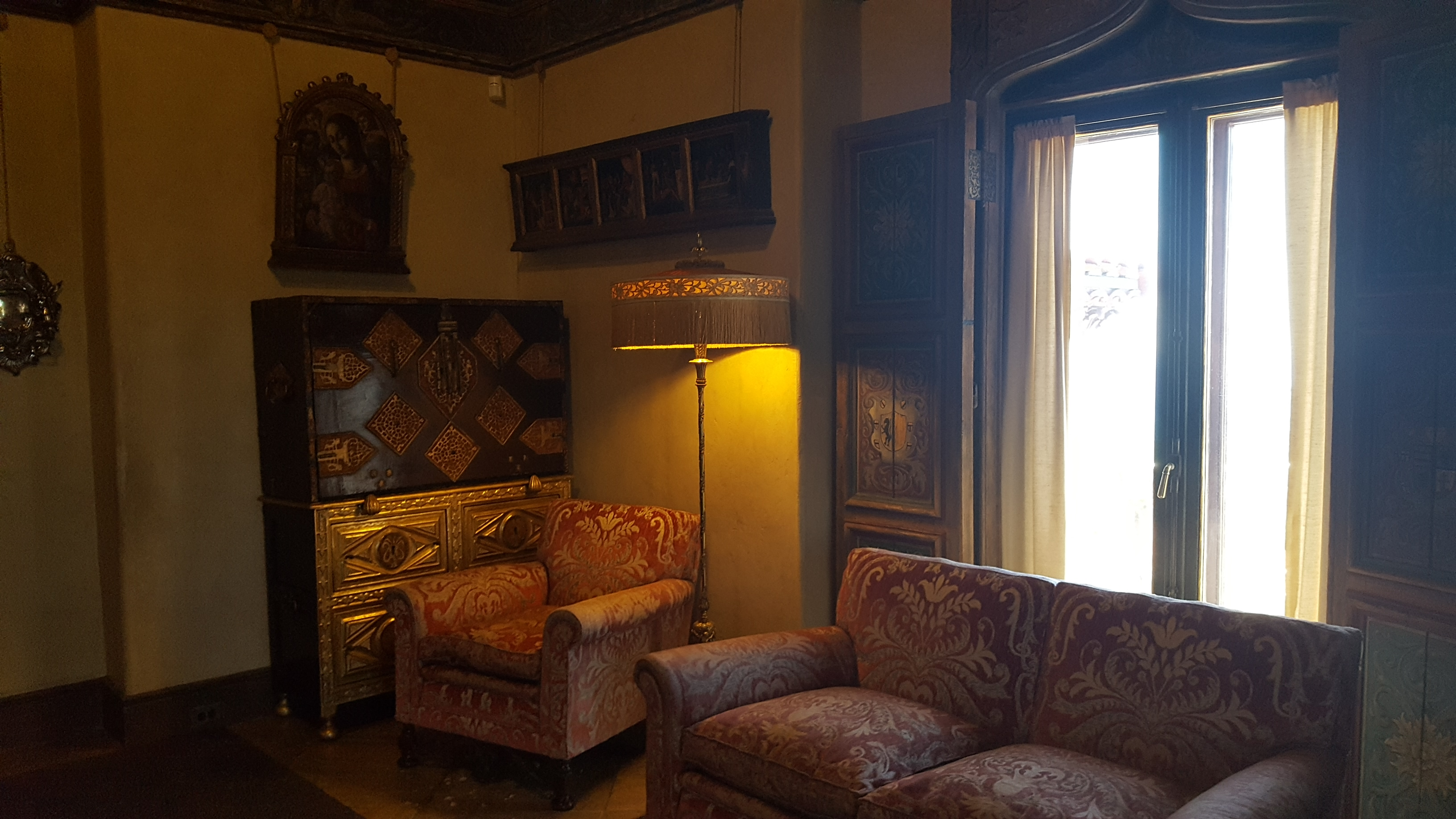
Interior of Davies's bedroom in Hearst Castle

In her memoirs, Davies claimed that she and publishing mogul William Randolph Hearst began their sexual relationship when she was a teenage chorus girl. Although they lived together for the next three decades in opulent homes across Southern California and Europe, they never married, because Hearst's wife refused to grant him a divorce. At one point, Hearst reportedly came close to marrying Davies, but decided his wife's settlement demands were too high. Although he was a notorious philanderer, Hearst was extremely jealous and possessive of Davies, even though he was married throughout their relationship. Lita Grey, Charlie Chaplin's second wife, wrote four decades later that Davies confided to her about her relationship with Hearst. Grey quoted Davies as saying:

God, I'd give everything I have to marry that silly old man. Not for the money and security—he's given me more than I'll ever need. Not because he's such cozy company, either. Most times, when he starts jawing, he bores me stiff. And certainly not because he's so wonderful behind the barn. Why, I could find a million better lays any Wednesday. No, you know what he gives me, sugar? He gives me the feeling I'm worth something to him. A whole lot of what we have, or don't have, I don't like. He's got a wife who'll never give him a divorce. She knows about me, but it's still understood that when she decides to go to the ranch for a week or a weekend, I've got to vamoose. And he snores, and he can be petty, and has sons about as old as me. But he's kind and he's good to me, and I'd never walk out on him.

Despite their well-known jealous attachment to one another, both Davies and Hearst had many sexual liaisons with others while living together in San Simeon and elsewhere. Davies had sexual relationships with fellow actors Charlie Chaplin, Dick Powell, and others, while Hearst had a sexual relationship with blonde chorus girl Maybelle Swor. According to Davies's friend and confidant Louise Brooks, Davies was particularly incensed by Hearst's indiscreet relations with Swor. Davies became irate when Hearst's newspapers began openly promoting Swor's career in nearly the same way they had promoted hers earlier.

By the late 1930s, amid the Great Depression, Hearst faced financial reversals. After selling many of the contents of St. Donat's Castle, Davies sold her jewelry, stocks, and bonds and wrote a check for $1 million to Hearst to save him from bankruptcy.

=== Alleged biological daughter ===
Since the early 1920s, rumors claimed that Davies and Hearst had a child between 1919 and 1923. In later years, the child was rumored to be Patricia Lake (née Van Cleve), who publicly identified herself as Davies's niece. On October 3, 1993, Lake died of complications from lung cancer in Indian Wells, California. Shortly before her death, her son claimed that Lake revealed she was the biological daughter of Davies and Hearst. There was never any comment on her alleged paternity in public, even after Hearst's and Davies's deaths. The claim was published in her newspaper death notice.

According to the rumor, Lake was conceived during Hearst's extramarital affair with Davies and out of wedlock. Hearst sent her to Europe to have the child secretly and avoid a public scandal. Hearst later joined Davies in Europe. Lake claimed she was born in a Catholic hospital outside Paris between 1919 and 1923 and was then given to Davies's sister Rose, whose own child had died in infancy, and passed off as Rose and her husband George Van Cleve's daughter. Lake stated that Hearst paid for her schooling, and that Davies and Hearst both spent considerable time with her. Davies purportedly told Lake of her true parentage when she was age 11, while Hearst confirmed he was her father on her wedding day at age 17, when both Davies and Hearst gave her away.

Factual evidence casts doubt on these claims. Birthday telegrams and photo documentation confirm Lake's 1919 birth date, and Davies did not go to Europe for the first time until 1922. Davies's film schedule was very busy in 1919, and none of them show any sign of pregnancy. When responding to the allegation that Lake was Davies and Hearst's daughter, a spokesman for Hearst Castle said, "It's a very old rumor and a rumor is all it ever was."

=== Thomas Ince scandal ===
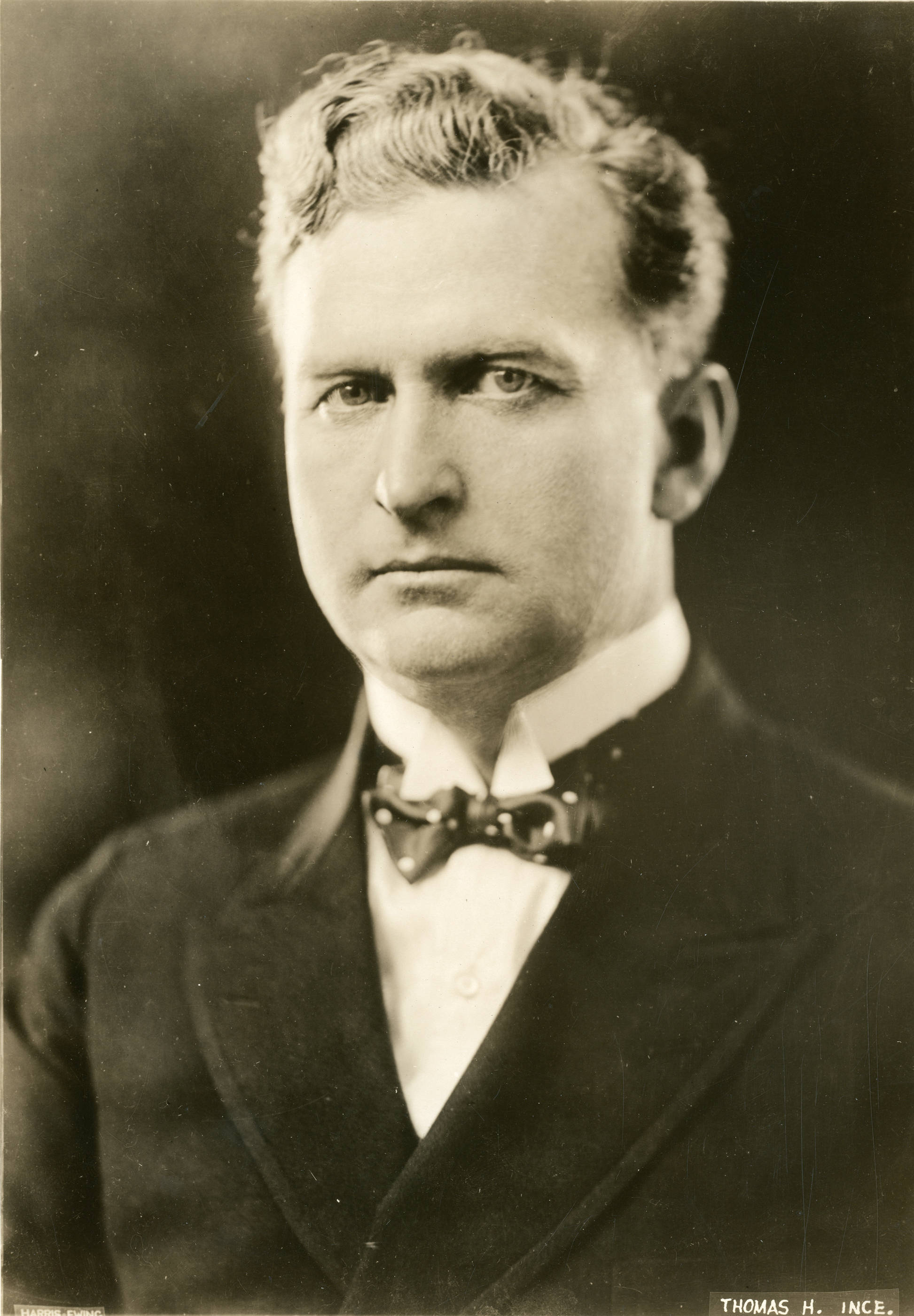
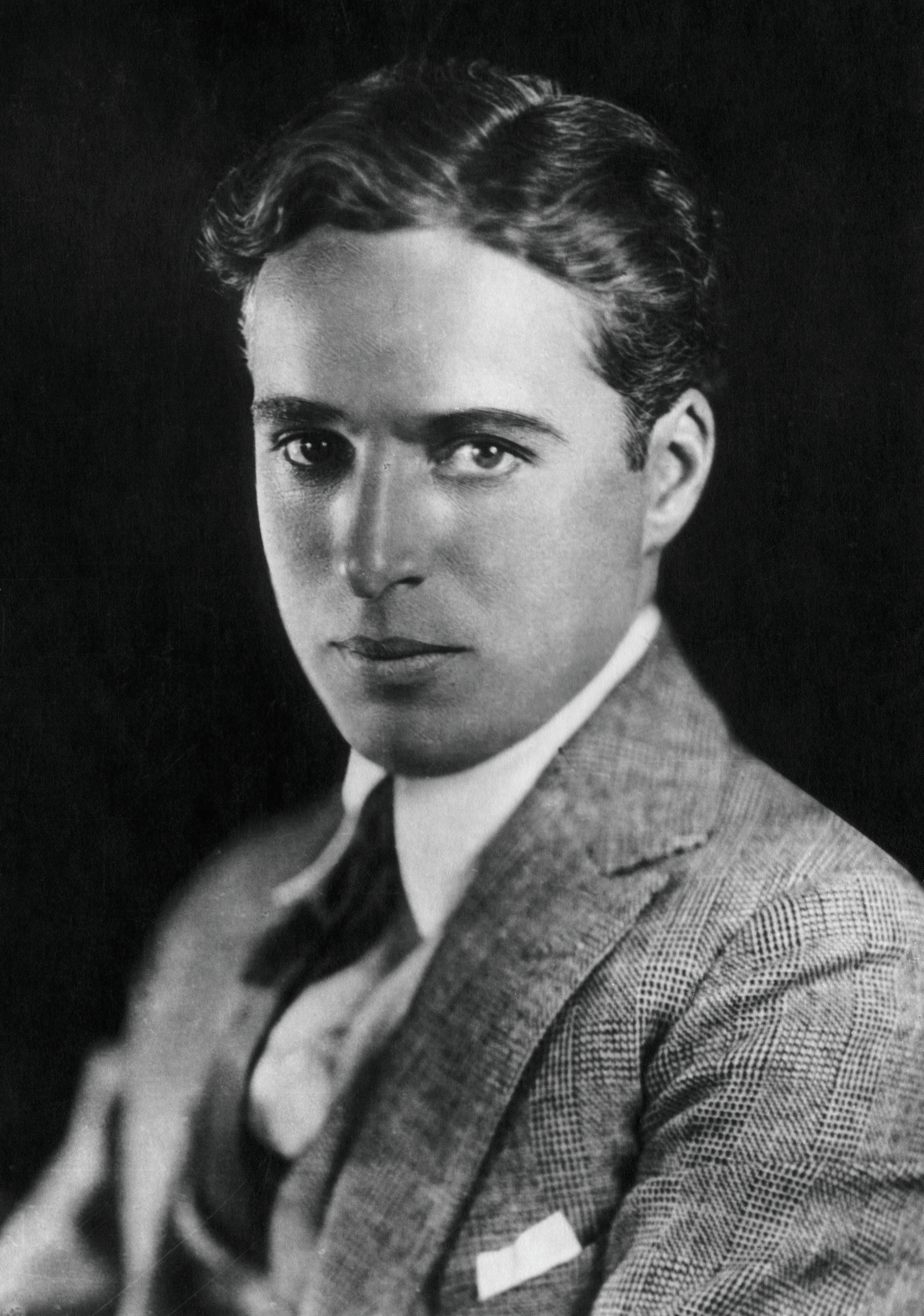
Thomas Ince in 1922 (left) and Charlie Chaplin in 1921 (right)

In November 1924, Davies was among those revelers aboard Hearst's steam yacht Oneida for a weekend party that culminated in the death of film producer Thomas Ince. Ince purportedly suffered an attack of acute indigestion while aboard the luxury yacht and was escorted from it in San Diego by Hearst's studio manager, Dr. Daniel Goodman. Ince was put on a train bound for Los Angeles. When his condition worsened, he was removed from the train at Del Mar. Dr. T. A. Parker and a nurse, Jesse Howard, provided him with medical attention. Ince allegedly told them he had drunk a strong liquor aboard Hearst's yacht. He was taken to his Hollywood home where he died.

Following Ince's death, rumors became widespread that Hearst had caught Ince "pressing unwelcome attentions on Miss Davies and shot him fatally". A variant of this rumor alleged that Davies had a sexual liaison with guest Charlie Chaplin, and that Hearst mistook Ince for Chaplin and shot him out of jealousy. Chaplin's valet allegedly witnessed Ince being carried from Hearst's yacht and claimed that Ince's head was "bleeding from a bullet wound". Screenwriter Elinor Glyn, a fellow guest at the party, claimed "everyone aboard the yacht had been sworn to secrecy, which would hardly have seemed necessary if poor Ince had died of natural causes". Years later, Chaplin's wife Lita Grey repeated claims that Chaplin had sexually pursued Marion Davies aboard Hearst's yacht and that a violent altercation had occurred. However, there was never any substantive evidence to support these allegations.

After Ince's death, District Attorney Chester C. Kempley of San Diego conducted an inquiry and issued a public statement which declared "the death of Thomas H. Ince was caused by heart failure as a result of an attack of acute indigestion". Despite the district attorney's declaration, and the fact that three physicians and a nurse had attended Ince before he died, the rumors persisted. Consequently, "one can still hear solemn stories in Hollywood today that Ince was murdered" in a jealous dispute over Davies.

== Later years ==
=== Retirement and Hearst's death ===
By 1937, Hearst was $126 million in debt (equivalent to $2.821875000×10^{9} in 2025 = 2 billion, 821 million, 875 thousand). Consequently, when Hearst's Cosmopolitan Pictures folded in 1938, Davies left the film business and retreated to San Simeon. She later claimed in her autobiography that, after many years of work, she grew bored with film acting and decided to devote herself to being Hearst's "companion". Although intensely ambitious, Davies at age forty she faced the harsh reality that she could no longer play young heroines as in her earlier films. When drunk at parties in San Simeon, Davies often lamented her retirement and "cursed everyone who felt she had contributed to her ruined career".

As the years passed, Davies developed a drinking problem, and her alcoholism grew worse in the late 1930s and the 1940s, as she and Hearst lived an increasingly isolated existence. Although Hearst and Davies "were still playing the gracious lord and his lady, and the guests were still responding with grateful expressions of joy," nevertheless "the life had gone out of their performances". The two spent most of World War II at Hearst's Northern California estate of Wyntoon until returning to San Simeon in 1945.

After a long period of illness, Hearst died on August 14, 1951, at age 88. In his will, he provided handsomely for Davies, leaving her 170,000 shares of Hearst Corporation stock, and 30,000 he had put in a trust fund he established for her in 1950. This gave her a controlling interest in the company for a short time, until she chose to relinquish the stock voluntarily to the corporation on October 30, 1951 by selling it to Mrs. Millicent Hearst for one dollar. She retained her original 30,000 shares and an advisory role with the corporation. She soon invested in property and owned The Desert Inn in Palm Springs and several properties in New York City, including the Squibb Building at Fifth Avenue and 58th Street, the Davies Building at E. 57th Street and the Douras Building at E. 55th Street.

=== Marriage to Brown and charity work ===
Following Hearst's death, most of Davies's coterie of hedonistic friends gradually drifted away, and "she relied upon one or two companion-nurses to keep the blues away". Eleven weeks and one day after Hearst's death, Davies married sea captain Horace Brown on October 31, 1951, in Las Vegas. Their union was unhappy. Davies filed for divorce twice, but neither was finalized, despite Brown admitting he treated her badly: "I'm a beast," he said. "I took him back. I don't know why," she explained. "I guess because he's standing right beside me, crying. Thank God we all have a sense of humor."

Throughout her later years, Davies was "noted for her kindness" and renowned for her generosity to charities. During the 1920s, she had become interested in children's charities, donating over $1 million. In 1952, she donated $1.9 million to establish a children's clinic at UCLA, which was named for her. The clinic's name was changed to the Mattel Children's Hospital in 1998. Davies also fought childhood diseases through the Marion Davies Foundation.

== Illness and death ==
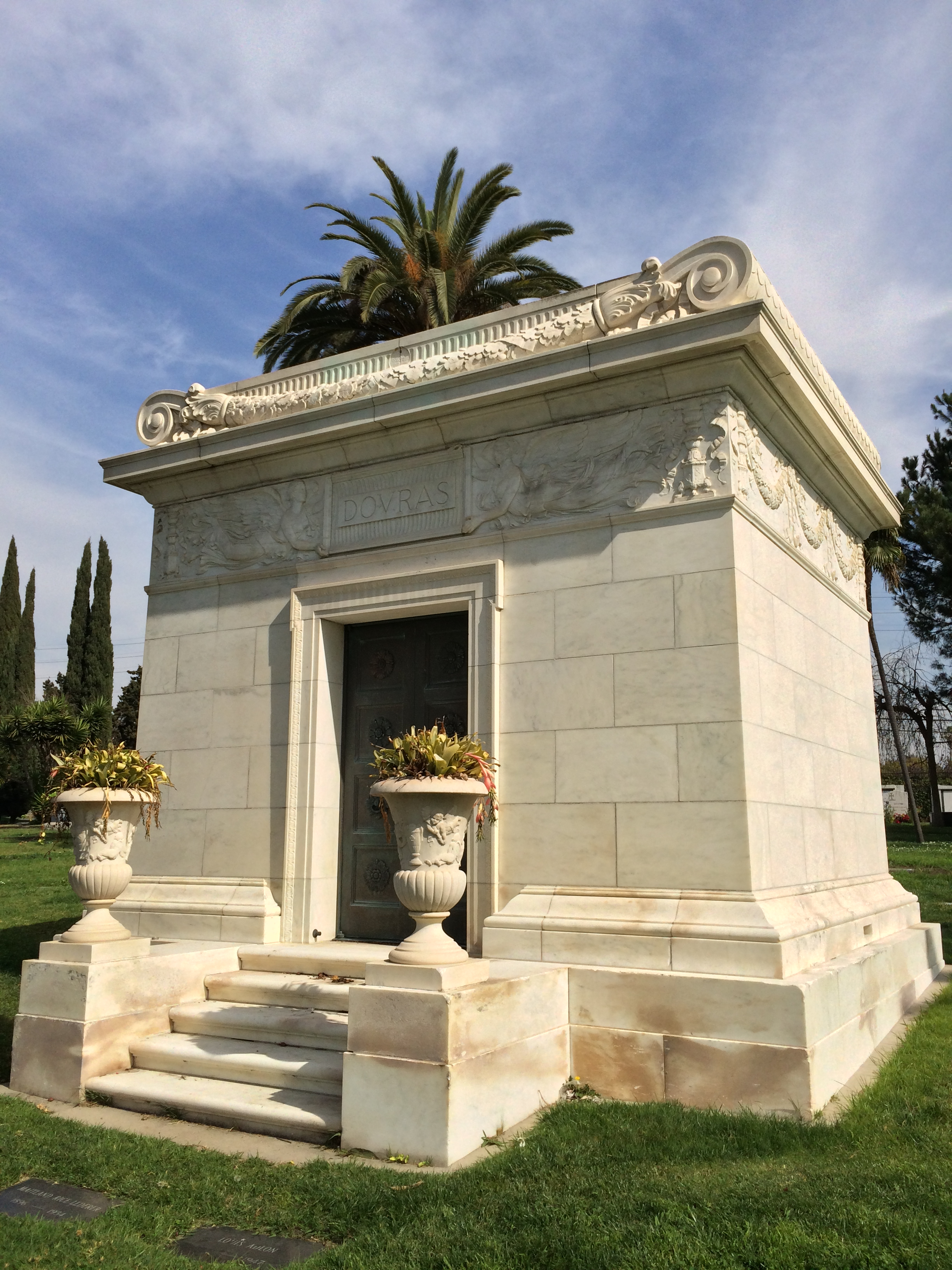
Davies's mausoleum at Hollywood Forever Cemetery

In the summer of 1956, after many decades of heavy drinking, Davies had a minor cerebral stroke and was admitted to Cedars of Lebanon Hospital. After the stroke, her Hollywood friends noted that "much of her old spirit and fire were gone". She quipped to columnist Hedda Hopper that "we blondes seem to be falling apart". She would never fully regain her health. During this time, many of her friends died, including Louis B. Mayer and Norma Talmadge. Their deaths convinced Davies that she would soon pass away as well.

Three years later, during a dental examination in February 1959, a growth was discovered on her jaw. Not long afterward, Davies was diagnosed with cancer. Davies made her last public appearance on January 10, 1960, on an NBC television special titled Hedda Hopper's Hollywood. During the same period, Joseph P. Kennedy rented Davies's mansion and worked from behind the scenes to secure his son John F. Kennedy's nomination during the 1960 Democratic National Convention in Los Angeles. When Joseph P. Kennedy learned Davies was dying of cancer, he "had three cancer specialists flown out" to examine her.

In the spring of 1961, Davies underwent surgery for malignant osteomyelitis. Twelve days after the operation, she fell in her hospital room and broke her leg. Her health failed rapidly over the summer. Davies died of the malignant osteomyelitis on September 22, 1961, in Hollywood. Over 200 mourners and many Hollywood celebrities, including her friends Mary Pickford, Harold Lloyd, Charles "Buddy" Rogers, Glenn Ford, Kay Williams, and Johnny Weissmuller attended her funeral at the Immaculate Heart of Mary Church in Hollywood. Davies was buried in the Hollywood Forever Cemetery. She left an estate estimated at $20 million (equivalent to $215,000,000 in 2025).

== Cultural legacy ==
=== Susan Alexander Kane ===
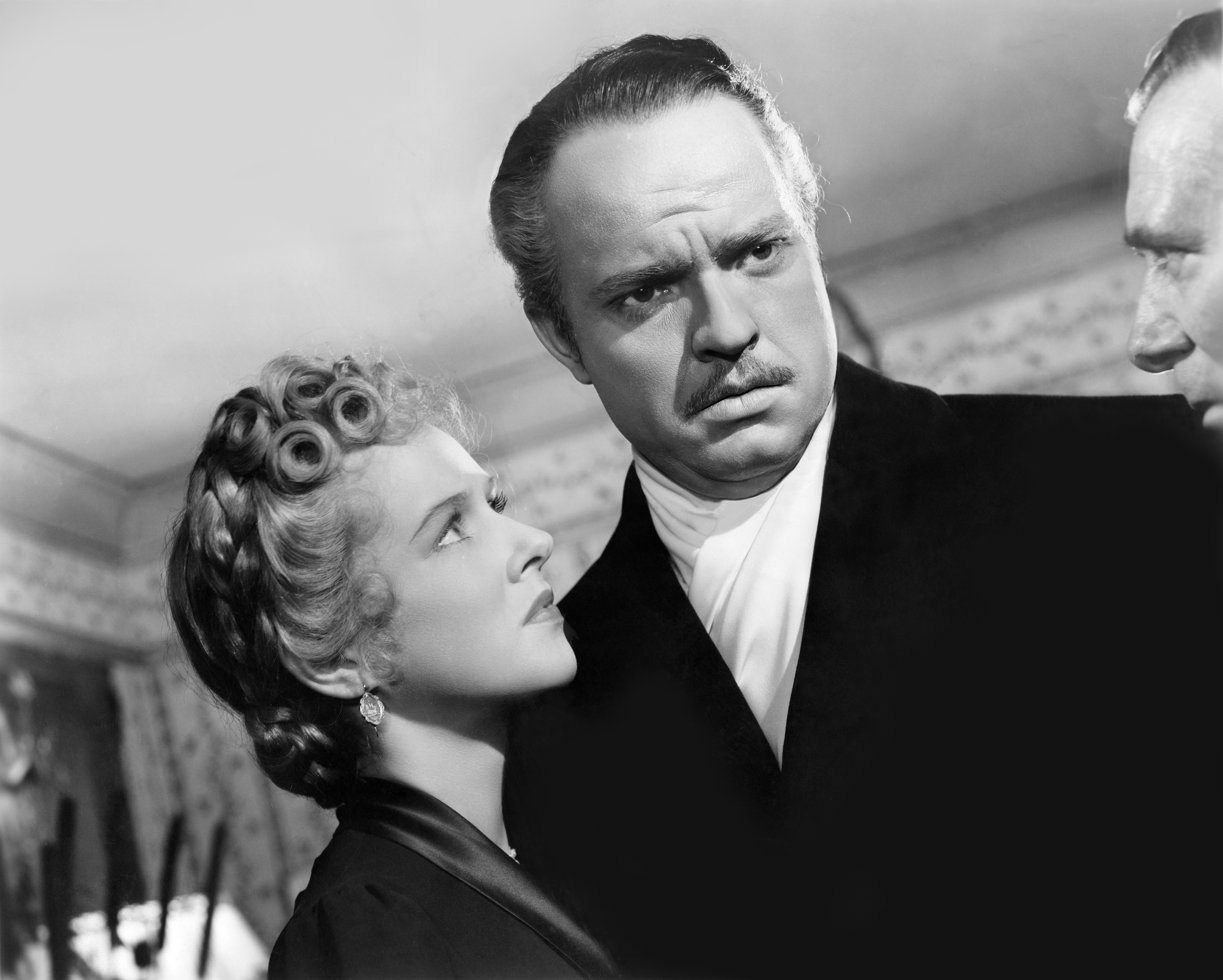
The character of Susan Alexander Kane (portrayed by Dorothy Comingore) in Citizen Kane (1941) was assumed to have been inspired by Davies, but Orson Welles repeatedly denied that the character was based on her.

According to biographers, the release of Orson Welles's Citizen Kane (1941) destroyed Davies's reputation. Film audiences mistakenly assumed Davies was the unalloyed inspiration for the character of Susan Alexander in the film, which was based loosely on Hearst's life. Many viewers, including journalists, "assumed that the powerful publisher Charles Kane in the film was Mr. Hearst, the huge castle Xanadu was in reality Mr. Hearst's fabulous estate San Simeon and the blonde young singer he tried to turn into a diva, although she had no voice, was in reality Miss Davies".

Consequently, a myth soon developed that Davies was "not a great actress and the films she made were not among the more impressive or profitable releases". By the time of her prolonged death from cancer, press obituaries erroneously depicted Davies to have been an extremely mediocre and unpopular actress during her lifetime. Contrary to this myth, most of Davies's films made money, and she remained a popular star for most of her career. She was the number one female box office star of 1922–23 because of the enormous popularity of 1922's When Knighthood Was in Flower and 1923's Little Old New York, which ranked among the biggest box-office hits of 1922 and 1923, respectively.

Over time, the popular association with the character of Susan Alexander Kane led to later revisionist portrayals of Davies as a talentless opportunist. In his later years, Orson Welles attempted to correct the widespread misconceptions which Citizen Kane had created about Davies's popularity and talents as an actress. In his foreword to Davies's autobiography, The Times We Had (published posthumously in 1975), Welles wrote that the fictional Susan Alexander Kane bears no resemblance to Davies:

That Susan was Kane's wife and Marion was Hearst's mistress is a difference more important than might be guessed in today's changed climate of opinion. The wife was a puppet and a prisoner; the mistress was never less than a princess. Hearst built more than one castle, and Marion was the hostess in all of them: they were pleasure domes indeed, and the Beautiful People of the day fought for invitations. Xanadu was a lonely fortress, and Susan was quite right to escape from it. The mistress was never one of Hearst's possessions: he was always her suitor, and she was the precious treasure of his heart for more than 30 years, until his last breath of life. Theirs is truly a love story. Love is not the subject of Citizen Kane.

Welles told filmmaker Peter Bogdanovich that Samuel Insull's construction of the Chicago Opera House, and Harold Fowler McCormick's lavish promotion of the opera career of his second wife Ganna Walska, were the actual influences for the Susan Alexander character in the Citizen Kane screenplay. "As for Marion," Welles said, "she was an extraordinary woman—nothing like the character Dorothy Comingore played in the movie ... Marion was much better than Susan—whom people wrongly equated with her".

=== Critical reassessment ===
Several decades after her death, a critical reassessment of Davies occurred as a result of greater availability of her notable films such as When Knighthood Was in Flower, Beauty's Worth, The Bride's Play, Enchantment, The Restless Sex, April Folly, and Buried Treasure. This availability allowed for a more accurate evaluation of Davies's oeuvre as an actress. In the 1970s, film critic Pauline Kael attempted to rehabilitate Davies's legacy and noted that her reputation had been unfairly maligned. Gradually, film critics became more appreciative of her efforts, particularly in comedy. According to biographers, "if Hearst had allowed her great talents as a mime and comic to come to full flower in a long series of comedies as bright as her Show People and The Patsy, her screen reputation could not have been so readily damaged by the controversy surrounding Citizen Kane".

=== Portrayals of Davies ===
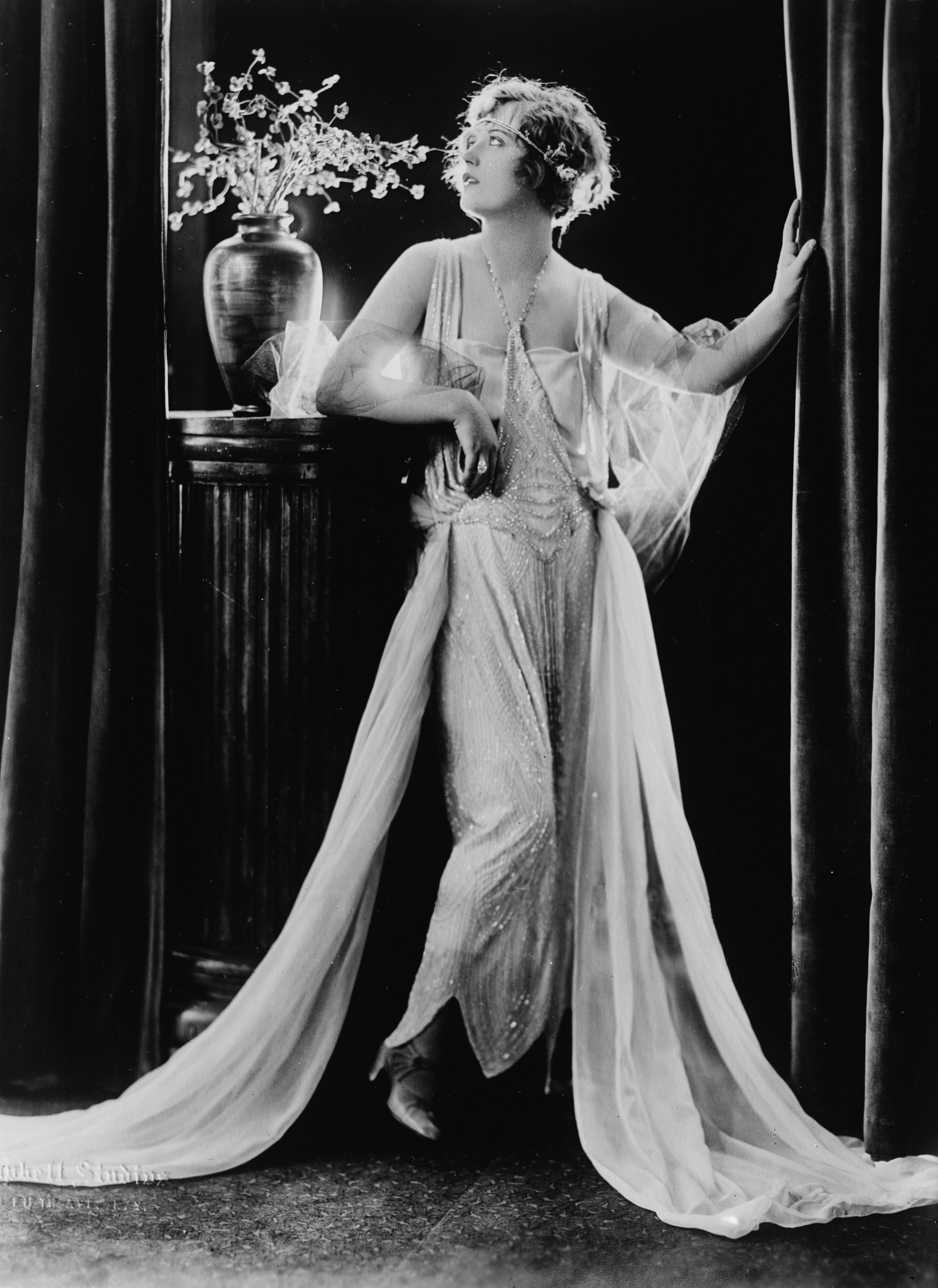
Davies circa the late 1910s

Since her death in 1961, different actresses have portrayed Davies in a variety of media. In 1985, Davies was portrayed by 23-year-old Virginia Madsen in the ABC telefilm The Hearst and Davies Affair with Robert Mitchum as Hearst. ABC inaccurately marketed the film as "the scandalous love affair between one of the richest and most powerful men in America and the obscure Ziegfeld girl he promoted to stardom". To prepare for the role, Madsen "screened Davies' movies, read books, hunted up a collector of Davies memorabilia and even interviewed the actress' stand-in". In the process, Madsen became a Davies fan and said she felt she had inadvertently portrayed her as a stereotype, rather than as a real person. In subsequent decades, Davies was portrayed by Heather McNair in Chaplin (1992) and by Gretchen Mol in Cradle Will Rock (1999).

The 1999 HBO movie RKO 281 focuses on the production of Citizen Kane and Hearst's efforts to prevent its release, with Melanie Griffith portraying Davies. The movie depicts Davies growing irritated with Hearst's lifestyle and political views.

In 2001, director Peter Bogdanovich's film The Cat's Meow debuted with 19-year-old Kirsten Dunst starring as Davies. Dunst's performance interpreted Davies as "a spoiled ingenue" who was the ambivalent "lover to two very different men". The film was based upon unsubstantiated rumors concerning the Thomas Ince scandal, which was dramatized in the play The Cat's Meow and then adapted into the movie. That same year, a documentary film Captured on Film: The True Story of Marion Davies (2001) premiered on Turner Classic Movies.

In 2004, the story of William Randolph Hearst and Davies was made into a musical titled WR and Daisy, with book and lyrics by Robert and Phyllis White and music by Glenn Paxton. Theater West performed it in 2004, and in 2009 and 2010 at the Annenberg Community Beach House in Santa Monica, California, the estate Hearst built for Davies in the 1920s.

Amanda Seyfried portrayed Davies in the 2020 Netflix film Mank about Herman J. Mankiewicz, the screenwriter of Citizen Kane. Seyfried was nominated for the Academy Award for Best Supporting Actress for her performance.

In the 2022 film Babylon, Davies is portrayed by Chloe Fineman.

== Filmography ==
Year	Title	Role	Director	Notes
1917	Runaway Romany	Romany	George W. Lederer	Lost film; also wrote the screenplay.
1918	Cecilia of the Pink Roses	Cecilia	Julius Steger	Lost film; also produced.
1918	The Burden of Proof	Elaine Brooks	John G. Adolfi	Lost film
1919	The Belle of New York	Violet Gray	Julius Steger	Survives incomplete at the Library of Congress; also produced
1919	Getting Mary Married	Mary Bussard	Allan Dwan	Preserved at the Library of Congress; also produced.
1919	The Dark Star	Rue Carew	Allan Dwan	Lost film
1919	The Cinema Murder	Elizabeth Dalston	George D. Baker	Lost film
1920	April Folly	April Poole	Robert Z. Leonard	Also produced
1920	The Restless Sex	Stephanie Cleland	Robert Z. Leonard	Preserved at the Library of Congress and Gosfilmofond
1921	Buried Treasure	Pauline Vandermuellen / Lucia	George D. Baker	Survives incomplete at the Library of Congress, missing its final reel
1921	Enchantment	Ethel Hoyt	Robert G. Vignola	Preserved at the Library of Congress
1922	The Bride's Play	Enid of Cashel / Aileen Barrett	George Terwilliger	Preserved at the Library of Congress
1922	Beauty's Worth	Prudence Cole	Robert G. Vignola	
1922	The Young Diana	Diana May	Robert G. Vignola	Lost film
1922	When Knighthood Was in Flower	Mary Tudor	Robert G. Vignola	
1923	The Pilgrim	Member of the Congregation	Charlie Chaplin	Uncredited role
1923	Adam and Eva	Eva King	Robert G. Vignola	Survives incomplete, with only reel 5 existing
1923	Little Old New York	Patricia O'Day	Sidney Olcott	
1924	Yolanda	Princess Mary / Yolanda	Robert G. Vignola	Preserved at the Cinémathèque royale de Belgique and the Museum of Modern Art
1924	Janice Meredith	Janice Meredith	E. Mason Hopper	Features a scene in Technicolor
1925	Zander the Great	Mamie Smith	George W. Hill	
1925	Lights of Old Broadway	Fely / Anne	Monta Bell	Preserved at the Library of Congress and UCLA Film and Television Archive; Features a scene in Technicolor
1925	Ben-Hur: A Tale of the Christ	Crowd Extra in Chariot Race	Fred Niblo	Uncredited role; Features scenes in Technicolor
1926	Beverly of Graustark	Beverly Calhoun / Prince Oscar	Sidney Franklin	Preserved at the Library of Congress; Features a scene in Technicolor
1927	The Red Mill	Tina	Roscoe Arbuckle	
1927	Tillie the Toiler	Tillie Jones	Hobart Henley	Preserved at the Eastman House Museum
1927	The Fair Co-Ed	Marion	Sam Wood	Preserved at the Library of Congress
1927	Quality Street	Phoebe Throssel	Sidney Franklin	Also produced
1928	The Patsy	Patricia Harrington	King Vidor	Also produced
1928	The Cardboard Lover	Sally	Robert Z. Leonard	Preserved in the Library of Congress; also produced
1928	Show People	Peggy Pepper / Patricia Pepoire / Herself	King Vidor	Also produced
1928	The Five O'Clock Girl	Patricia Brown	Robert Z. Leonard	Film was never released
1928	Rosalie	Princess Rosalie Romanikov		Incomplete
1929	Marianne	Marianne	Robert Z. Leonard	Producer (uncredited); silent version co-starring Oscar Shaw
1929	Marianne	Marianne	Robert Z. Leonard	Producer (uncredited); sound version co-starring Lawrence Gray
1929	The Hollywood Revue of 1929	Herself	Charles Reisner	Features scenes in Technicolor
1930	Not So Dumb	Dulcinea 'Dulcy' Parker	King Vidor	Also produced
1930	The Florodora Girl	Daisy Dell	Harry Beaumont	Also produced; Features a scene in Technicolor
1931	The Bachelor Father	Antoinette 'Tony' Flagg	Robert Z. Leonard	Also produced
1931	It's a Wise Child	Joyce Stanton	Robert Z. Leonard	Preserved at the UCLA Archive; also produced.
1931	Five and Ten	Jennifer Rarick	Robert Z. Leonard	Also produced
1932	Polly of the Circus	Polly Fisher	Alfred Santell	Also produced
1932	Blondie of the Follies	Blondie McClune	Edmund Goulding	Also produced
1933	Peg o' My Heart	Margaret 'Peg' O'Connell	Robert Z. Leonard	
1933	Going Hollywood	Sylvia Bruce	Raoul Walsh	
1934	Operator 13	Gail Loveless	Richard Boleslawski	
1935	Page Miss Glory	Loretta Dalrymple / Miss Dawn Glory	Mervyn LeRoy	Also produced
1936	Hearts Divided	Elizabeth "Betsy" Patterson	Frank Borzage	Also produced
1936	Cain and Mabel	Mabel O'Dare	Lloyd Bacon	
1937	Ever Since Eve	Miss Marjorie 'Marge' Winton / Sadie Day	Lloyd Bacon	

=== Short subjects ===
Year	Title	Role	Director	Notes
1922	A Trip to Paramountown	Herself	Jack Cunningham	
1930	Screen Snapshots Series 9, No. 23	Herself	Ralph Staub	
1931	Jackie Cooper's Birthday Party	Herself	Charles Reisner	
1931	The Christmas Party	Herself	Charles Reisner	
1935	A Dream Comes True	Herself		
1935	Pirate Party on Catalina Isle	Herself	Gene Burdette	

== See also ==
- History of Santa Monica, California, in the 1920s
