= Double Crossed (film) =

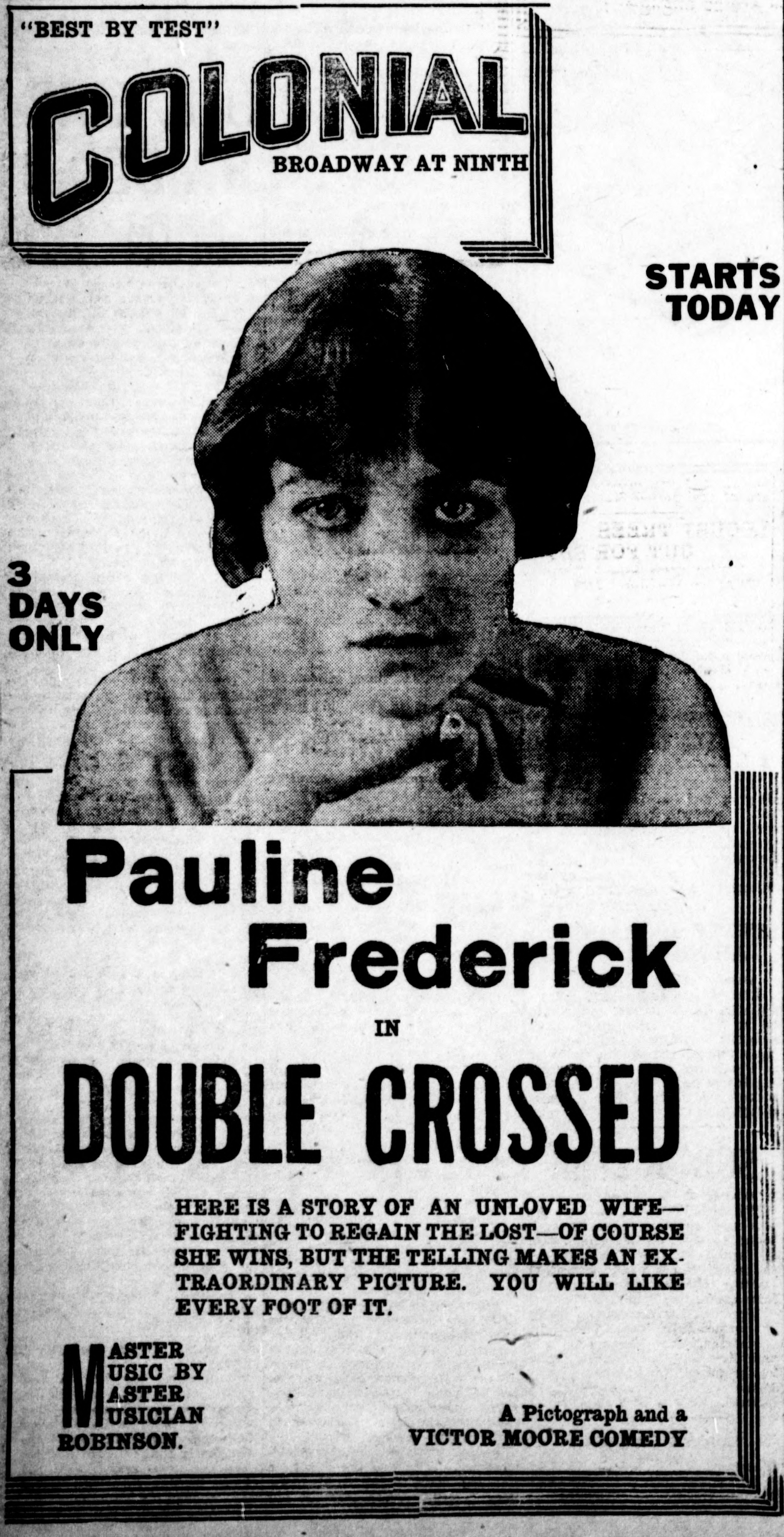
- Newspaper advertisement
- Directed by: Robert G. Vignola
- Written by: Eve Unsell (scenario)
- Story by: Hector Turnbull
- Starring: Pauline Frederick; Crauford Kent
- Cinematography: Ned Van Buren
- Production company: Famous Players–Lasky
- Distributed by: Paramount Pictures
- Release date: September 16, 1917
- Running time: 50 minutes
- Country: United States
- Language: Silent (English intertitles)

Double Crossed is a 1917 American silent drama film directed by Robert G. Vignola and starred Pauline Frederick and Crauford Kent. Produced by Famous Players–Lasky and distributed by Paramount Pictures, the film's story was written by Hector Turnbull and the scenario by Eve Unsell.

== Plot ==
As described in a film magazine, while attending a house party with her husband, Eleanor Stratton overhears a conversation between a detective Jim Foley and her husband Frederick, in which the latter is commanded to produce a receipt held by Worthington Lawrence, their host, under penalty of being exposed for a petty theft committed years ago. To save her husband, Eleanor obtains the receipt and motors to the city the next day with it, where Foley has promised to deliver to her the signed confession of her husband.

Foley tricks her up to his rooms, where he obtains the receipt but fails to deliver the confession. He promises to give it to her if she will return that evening. While he is getting the paper from a desk, Eleanor puts two sleeping powders in a glass of wine, but Foley discovers her and in the tussle that results Foley strikes his head on a buffet and is rendered unconscious. Eleanor escapes and while attempting to return the receipt to Worthington's desk is discovered by her husband. After explaining matters to him, an understanding is reached. Meanwhile, Foley has recovered and tells political boss by telephone that six masked intruders had broken into his rooms and stolen the receipt.

== Cast ==
- Pauline Frederick as Eleanor Stratton
- Crauford Kent as Frederick Stratton
- Riley Hatch as Jim Foley
- Clarence Handyside as Worthington Lawrence
- Harris Gordon as Tommy Gaylord
- Joseph W. Smiley as "Pud" Dillsman

== Reception ==
Like many American films of the time, Double Crossed was subject to cuts by city and state film censorship boards. The Chicago Board of Censors required cuts from scenes showing a woman prying a table drawer open (two scenes), the taking of papers from an envelope, woman putting drugs in wine, and the taking of papers from an envelope.

== Preservation ==
Double Crossed is currently presumed lost. In February of 2021, the film was cited by the National Film Preservation Board on their Lost U.S. Silent Feature Films list.

== See also ==
- List of lost films
