= Rory O'More (film) =

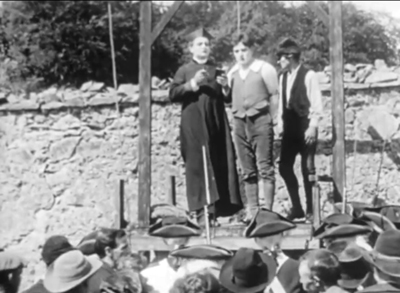
- From left to right: Arthur Donaldson and Jack J. Clark.
- Directed by: Sidney Olcott; Robert G. Vignola
- Written by: Gene Gauntier
- Produced by: Kalem Company
- Starring: Gene Gauntier; Jack J. Clark
- Cinematography: George Hollister
- Release date: September 4, 1911
- Running time: 1000 ft
- Country: United States
- Languages: Silent film (English intertitles)

Rory O'More is a 1911 American silent film produced by Kalem Company. It was directed by Sidney Olcott and Robert G. Vignola, with Gene Gauntier and Jack J. Clark in the leading roles. It is based on the novel and play by Samuel Lover. While the historical Rory O'More took part in the Irish Rebellion of 1641, the film places the story in the context of the Irish Rebellion of 1798.

== Cast ==
- Gene Gauntier as Kathleen
- Jack J. Clark as Rory O'More
- Arthur Donaldson as Father O'Brien
- Robert Vignola as Black Williams
- J.P. McGowan as British Officer
- Anna Clark as Rory's Mother

== Production notes ==
The film was shot in Beaufort, County Kerry, Ireland, during summer of 1911.
