= Luther Reed =

American screenwriter and film director

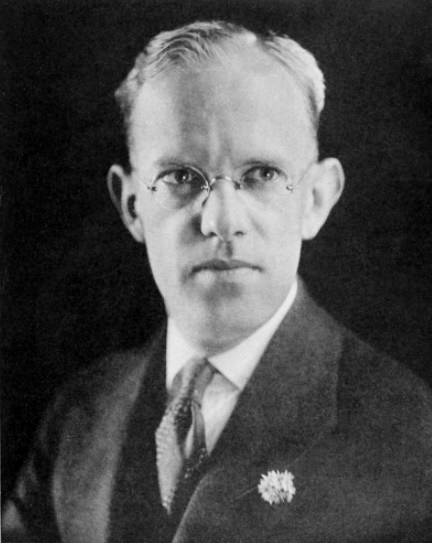
- Reed c. 1920
- Born: Luther Reed; July 14, 1888; Berlin, Wisconsin, United States
- Died: November 16, 1961 (aged 73); New York City, New York, United States
- Occupations: Director, screenwriter
- Spouses: Naomi Childers (m. 1920; div. 1929) Jocelyn Lee (m. 1930; div. 1931)

Luther A. Reed (July 14, 1888 – November 16, 1961) was an American screenwriter and film director.

== Biography ==
Reed was born in 1888 in Berlin, Wisconsin, and graduated from Columbia University. He worked as a journalist and the music and theater critic for the New York Herald before his film career. Reed directed such films as Convention Girl, Dixiana and Hit the Deck. He also worked with Howard Hughes on the film Hell's Angels.

Reed was married to actress Naomi Childers until their divorce in 1929. They had one son together. He then married the actress Jocelyn Lee (born Mary Alice Simpson, 1902–1980) on June 15, 1930, but separated from her after three months and divorced her in 1931 after she attacked him in a Mexican hotel.

Reed died in New York City in 1961.

== Partial filmography ==
- With Neatness and Dispatch (1918)
- Our Mrs. McChesney (1918)
- The Amateur Adventuress (1919)
- Almost Married (1919)
- Some Bride (1919)
- Behind the Door (1919)
- Mary's Ankle (1920)
- Let's Be Fashionable (1920)
- The Lure of Youth (1921)
- Beau Revel (1921)
- Get-Rich-Quick Wallingford (1921)
- Beauty's Worth (1922)
- The Young Diana (1922)
- Adam and Eva (1923)
- Little Old New York (1923)
- The Purple Highway (1923)
- The Great White Way (1924)
- Yolanda (1924)
- Lovers in Quarantine (1925)
- Womanhandled (1925)
- Let's Get Married (1926)
- Kid Boots (1926)
- The Ace of Cads (1926)
- New York (1927)
- Evening Clothes (1927)
- The World at Her Feet (1927)
- Shanghai Bound (1927)
- Honeymoon Hate (1927)
- The Sawdust Paradise (1928)
- Rio Rita (1929)
- Hit the Deck (1930)
- Dixiana (1930)
- Bachelor Mother (1932)
- The Sweetheart of Sigma Chi (1933)
- Convention Girl (1935)
