= The Stranger (1910 film) =

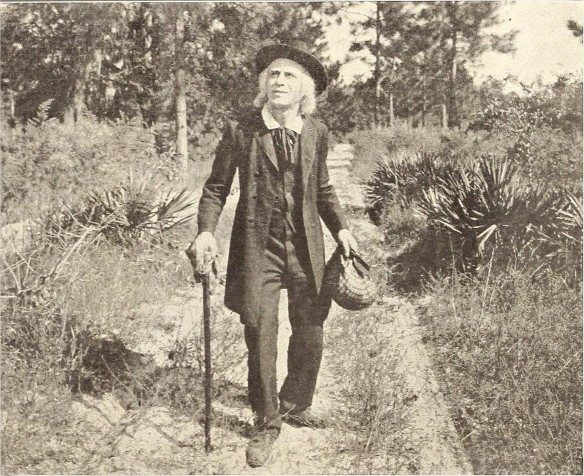
- Robert G. Vignola
- Directed by: Sidney Olcott
- Produced by: Sidney Olcott
- Starring: Gene Gauntier; Robert Vignola
- Production company: Kalem Company
- Distributed by: General Film Company
- Release date: December 30, 1910
- Running time: 1005 ft
- Country: United States
- Languages: Silent film (English intertitles)

The Stranger is an American silent film directed by Sidney Olcott with Gene Gauntier and Robert Vignola in the leading roles, and produced by Kalem Company, released in December 1910.

== Plot summary ==
An elderly stranger walks into the town of Rotherfield, and boards at the Rhode Inn. The daughter of the innkeeper, Ann Rhode becomes attracted to him, though her father cautions her, saying the stranger is too old and too poor for her. The stranger reveals that his name is Amos Brown, but reveals nothing else about himself, and Ann continues to be attracted to him. Gossip starts to spread about Amos, and Cecil Lattimer, who is betrothed to Ann, bets gambler Eddie Lockman that he can figure out the stranger's identity. Cecil, who really made the bet because he is spiteful and wants to kill Amos, lures him to the top of a mountain, and tries to pull him off. Thankfully, Eddie has followed Cecil, and he shoots him; but at that moment Ann's father comes. He thinks that Amos has killed Cecil to get Ann, but Eddie sacrifices himself so that Amos will not be hanged. Later, Amos takes Ann out on a walk to the town, and reveals to her that he is really a young man, and that he is fleeing the police in the neighboring town of Rackham, because they mistakenly believe that he has committed a murder there; Anne says she will marry him anyway, but he says he will only do so when his name is cleared. Suddenly, a posse from Rackham, led by the mayor, who chase Amos. He bids Ann to hide, and then, quickly giving a man twenty dollars for his horse, rides away from the posse, eventually being chased up the mountain. Finally, the mayor confronts Amos on top of the mountain, and reveals he is not the real mayor, but Cecil Lattimer! Cecil tries to kill Amos, but Amos pushes him off the mountain in self-defense. Ann comes up the mountain, and worries that Amos will be hanged for murdering Cecil, so she attempts to hide the body, but her father, accompanied by a doctor (the same man who Amos bought a horse from), and the doctor examines Cecil, and says he died of an apoplexy before he fell, and then Ann's father says that the real Rackham murderer has been found, and so Amos and Ann embrace.

== Cast ==
- Gene Gauntier as Ann Rhode
- Robert Vignola as Amos Brown
- Charles West as Cecil Lattimer
- Charles Ogle as Innkeeper Rhode
- Alfred Paget as Eddie Lockman
- W. Chrystie Miller as doctor

== Bibliography ==
- The Bioscope, 1911, February 9.
- The Film Index, 1910, December 24, p 21; December 31, p 5, p 22.
- The Moving Picture World, vol 7, p 1547; vol 8, n°1, p 88.
- The New York Dramatic Mirror, 1911, January 4, p 30.
