= Adam and Eva =

1923 film by Robert G. Vignola

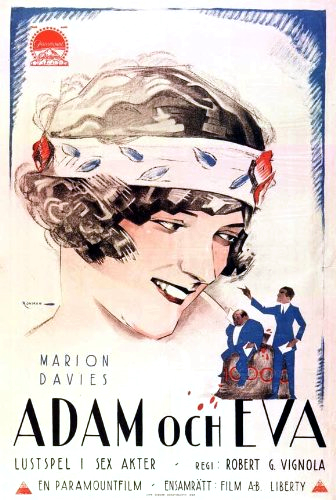
- Swedish film poster
- Directed by: Robert G. Vignola
- Screenplay by: Luther Reed
- Based on: Adam and Eva by Guy Bolton and George Middleton
- Produced by: William Randolph Hearst
- Starring: Marion Davies; T. Roy Barnes; Tom Lewis; William Norris; Percy Ames; Leon Gordon; Luella Gear
- Cinematography: Tony Gaudio; Harold Wenstrom
- Production company: Cosmopolitan Productions
- Distributed by: Paramount Pictures
- Release date: February 11, 1923
- Running time: 80 minutes
- Country: United States
- Language: Silent (English intertitles)

Adam and Eva is a 1923 American comedy silent film directed by Robert G. Vignola and adapted by Luther Reed from the play by Guy Bolton and George Middleton. The film stars Marion Davies, T. Roy Barnes, Tom Lewis, William Norris, Percy Ames, Leon Gordon, and Luella Gear. Marion Davies plays an extravagant girl who, when her father goes bust, reforms by learning the simple life and making a farm a thriving business venture. The film was released on February 11, 1923, by Paramount Pictures.

== Plot ==
As described in a film magazine, Eva, daughter of millionaire James King, spends money wastefully and enjoys life wonderfully. Her elder sister Julie and her husband Clinton Dewitt live in the King mansion, content to share the wealthy man's fortunes. Among Eva's admirers are Dr. Delamater and Lord Andrew Gordon, each financially weak and desiring a rich wife. Old James is nearly driven mad by his daughter's extravagances. His South American representative Adam Smith comes to New York City to see him. James suddenly announces that he will go to South America for a few months and leave Adam in charge of his family and the Gotham City business interests. While James is gone, Adam falls in love with Eva but is unable to curb her spendthrift ways until he comes up with the idea of declaring that her father is ruined, which brings matters to a climax. Confronted by poverty, Eva rises to the occasion and makes her sister go to work as well as her Uncle Horace, and goes to live on a farm belonging to her father. There, with her sister and aided by Adam, she proceeds to raise eggs and honey for the markets. The family works hard. One day James returns to be stunned with the news that his previously ne'er-do-wells have turned over a new leaf and are making good. When the family learns the truth about James, they do not regret the lesson they have learned.

== Cast ==
- Marion Davies as Eva King
- T. Roy Barnes as Adam Smith, The Salesman-Hero
- Tom Lewis as James King
- William Norris as Uncle Horace
- Percy Ames as Lord Andrew Gordon
- Leon Gordon as Clinton Dewitt
- Luella Gear as Julie Dewitt
- William B. Davidson as Dr. Delamater
- Edward Douglas as Lord Andrew's
- Bradley Barker as Eve's Admirer
- John Powers as Eve's Admirer
- Horace James as Gardener

== Production ==
In her 16th film, Marion Davies stars as a spendthrift in a film that was mostly shot on location in Stamford, Connecticut. One sequence was set in Venice, Italy, and one magazine article said, "A little bit of Venice with its winding canals and its picturesque gondolas was transported to the hills of Connecticut...." The Venetian sets were designed by Joseph Urban. The film was a hit at the box office.

== Survival status ==
Adam and Eva survives only as a fragment with only reel number 5 held by the Library of Congress.
