= Audrey (1916 film) =

1916 film

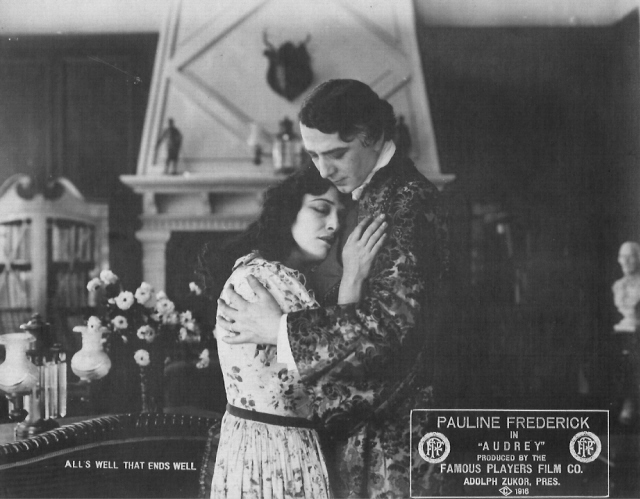
- Directed by: Robert G. Vignola
- Based on: Audrey by Mary Johnston
- Starring: Pauline Frederick
- Production company: Famous Players Film Company
- Distributed by: Paramount Pictures
- Release date: March 26, 1916 (United States)
- Running time: 50 minutes
- Country: United States
- Languages: Silent; English intertitles

Audrey is a 1916 American silent drama film produced by Famous Players Film Company and released through Paramount Pictures. The film stars Pauline Frederick and was directed by Robert G. Vignola. It is based on a novel of the same name about an orphan by Mary Johnston. The film opened at the Strand Theatre in New York City in March 1916.

== Cast ==
- Pauline Frederick as Audrey
- Charles Waldron as Lord Haward
- Margarete Christians as Evelyn Byrd
- E. L. Fernandez as Jean Hugon (credited as E. Fernandez)
- Helen Lindroth as Mrs. Darden
- Henry Hallam as Mr. Darden
- Jack Clark as John Byrd
- Rita Connolly as (uncredited)

== Preservation ==
Audrey is currently presumed lost. In February 2021, the film was cited by the National Film Preservation Board on their Lost U.S. Silent Feature Films list.

== See also ==
- List of lost films
