= Beauty's Worth =

1922 film by Robert G. Vignola

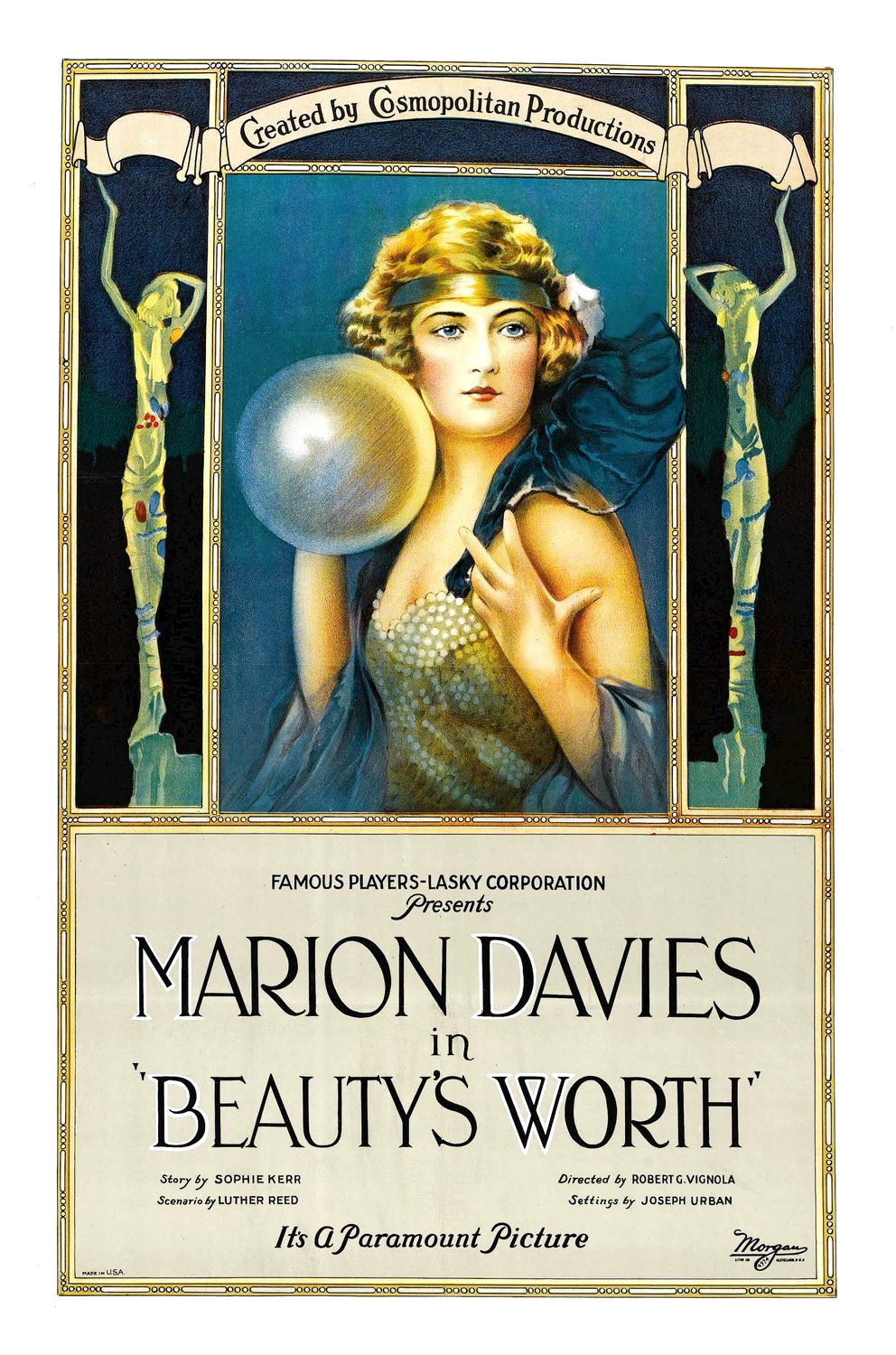
- Film poster
- Directed by: Robert G. Vignola
- Written by: Luther Reed (scenario)
- Based on: "Beauty's Worth"; 1920 story in Saturday Evening Post by Sophie Kerr
- Starring: Marion Davies; Forrest Stanley
- Cinematography: Ira H. Morgan
- Production company: Cosmopolitan Productions
- Distributed by: Paramount Pictures
- Release date: March 18, 1922 (New York City)
- Running time: 7 reels (6751 feet)
- Country: United States
- Language: Silent (English intertitles)

Beauty's Worth is a 1922 American romantic comedy drama film directed by Robert G. Vignola, starring Marion Davies as an unsophisticated Quaker who ventures to a seaside resort, meets a Bohemian artist, and falls in love.

== Plot ==
Beauty's Worth (full film)

As described in a film magazine, Prudence Cole, a young Quaker woman, has been raised by her two severe maiden aunts, Elizabeth and Cynthia Whitney. She is permitted to visit the Garrisons, the mother and her grown son Henry, at an ultra fashionable resort, where her precise mannerisms make her the center of amused attention. Henry, whom she had hoped to marry, all but ignores her. Artist and thinker Cheyne Rovein senses the young woman's position and selects her for the leading role in elaborate charades which he stages, designing costumes and coaching her as to conduct. On this night she outshines her critics, wins the admiration of the men and the enmity of the women, and the dallying Henry returns to pay her court. The following morning she refuses him and promises to marry Cheyne.

== Cast ==
- Marion Davies as Prudence Cole
- Forrest Stanley as Cheyne Rovein
- June Elvidge as Amy Tillson
- Truly Shattuck as Mrs. Garrison
- Lydia Yeamans Titus as Jane
- Hallam Cooley as Henry Garrison
- Antrim Short as Tommy
- Thomas Jefferson as Peter
- Martha Mattox as Aunt Elizabeth Whitney
- Aileen Manning as Aunt Cynthia Whitney
- Gordon Dooley as Doll (in charade scene)
- Johnny Dooley as Soldier (in charade scene)

== Production ==
In her 13th film, Marion Davies re-teamed with Forrest Stanley for this romantic comedy/drama. Location shooting was again at Point Lobos on the Monterey Peninsula. The centerpiece of the film is the stunning "tableaux vivants" in which Davies recreates her dancing doll routine from the 1916 edition of the Ziegfeld Follies. The pageant was once again designed by Joseph Urban. The pageant scenes were originally tinted.

== Preservation ==
Complete 35mm nitrate and acetate prints of Beauty's Worth are held by the Library of Congress.

A DVD of the film was released by Edward Lorusso with a music score by Ben Model in July 2017.

== Legacy ==
On August 11, 2018 the film has been shown in Robert G. Vignola's birthplace Trivigno, with the collaboration of Pordenone Silent Film Festival, as part of a project to recover Vignola's activity. It has been scored live by Stephen Horne and the "Zerorchestra" ensemble from Pordenone.
