= The Love That Lives =

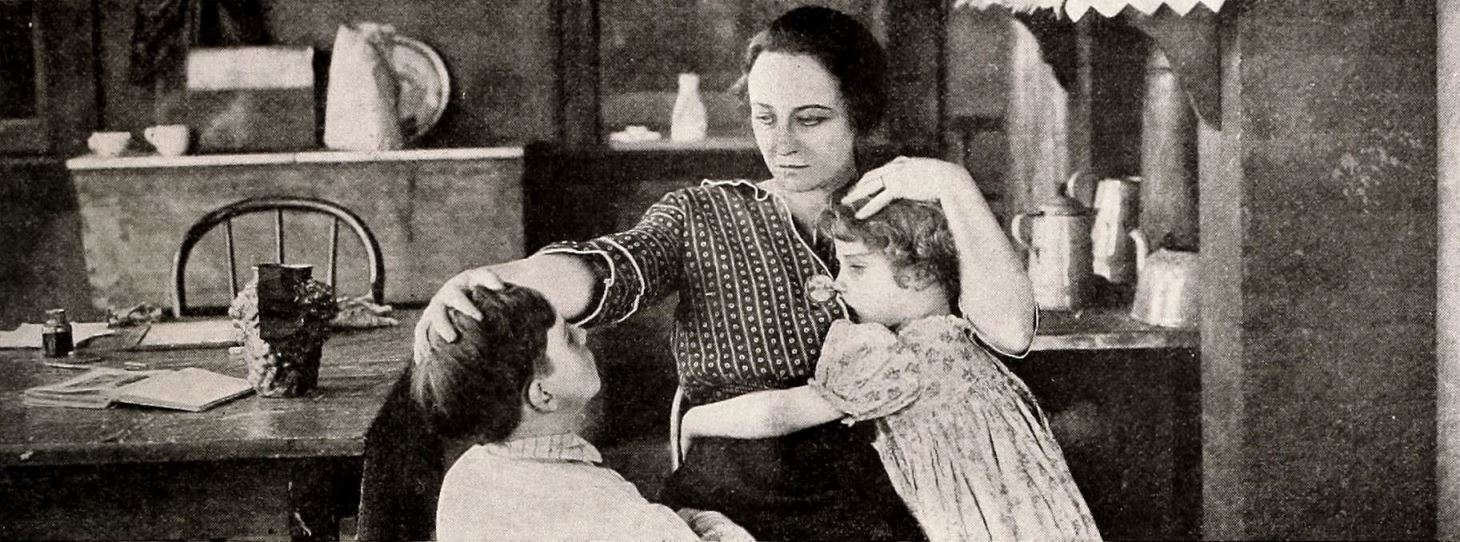
- Still with Pauline Frederick
- Directed by: Robert G. Vignola
- Based on: "Flames of Sacrifice" by Scudder Middleton
- Starring: Pauline Frederick
- Cinematography: Ned Van Buren
- Production company: Famous Players Film Company
- Distributed by: Paramount Pictures
- Release date: July 9, 1917
- Running time: 50 minutes
- Country: United States
- Language: Silent (English intertitles)

The Love That Lives is a 1917 American silent drama film produced by Famous Players Film Company and distributed through Paramount Pictures. The film stars Pauline Frederick and was directed by Robert G. Vignola. The film is based on the story "Flames of Sacrifice", by Scudder Middleton.

A copy of this film is preserved at the George Eastman Museum in New York.

== Plot ==
As described in a film magazine review, the life of Molly McGill has been a hard struggle since birth, and upon the death of her husband in a barroom brawl and her baby daughter in an accident, she offers herself to Harvey Brooks, a broker, to provide money for the education of her son Jimmy. She keeps her life a secret from the boy. He grows to manhood, secures a position in the city fire department, and becomes engaged to Dora Palmer. Molly breaks with Brooks and sinks to the slum's lowest level. One day while passing the engine room, Molly sees her son taking to his sweetheart. She gets a job as a scrubwoman and later saves Dora from Brooks by stabbing him. The office building catches fire and Jimmy saves Dora but is unable to save his mother.

== Cast ==
- Pauline Frederick as Molly McGill
- John St. Polis as Harvey Brooks
- Pat O'Malley as Jimmy
- Joseph Carroll as Jimmy as a Child
- Violet Palmer as Dora Palmer
- Frank Evans as Pete McGill
- Eldean Steuart as Little Molly

== Reception ==
Like many American films of the time, The Love That Lives was subject to city and state film censorship boards. The Chicago Board of Censors initially issued the film, due to its subject matter, an Adults Only permit. On further review, the Chicago Board required the following changes which altered the plot: Reel 1, cut two craps shooting scenes and flash three others, cut killing of man; Reel 2, after the vision of Molly in rich garb insert intertitle "If not for the boy she would be a desirable wife", cut vision of shooting; Reel 3, insert an intertitle where Molly and Brooks are talking "If you marry me, I will provide for you and the boy. If you don't, it means struggle and poverty for you both", add intertitle "Midnight" and clock indicating the same, on envelope change name from "Molly McGill" to "Molly Brooks", and insert subtitle "My marriage was a mistake, I should have remained with my boy" during an altercation between Molly and Brooks; Reel 4, cut all scenes in dance hall newsman sells Molly newspaper to include subtitle starting with "Cheer up, old girl"; Reel 5, cut entire sequence of girl's exposed legs, a man looking at them, and girl pulling down dress, cut man locking door, intertitle "You may go, but the girl remains", and the stabbing of a man with spindle. Some of the intertitle changes were to suggest that Molly was married to Harvey Brooks and not his mistress.
