= Robert G. Vignola =

American artist (1882–1953)

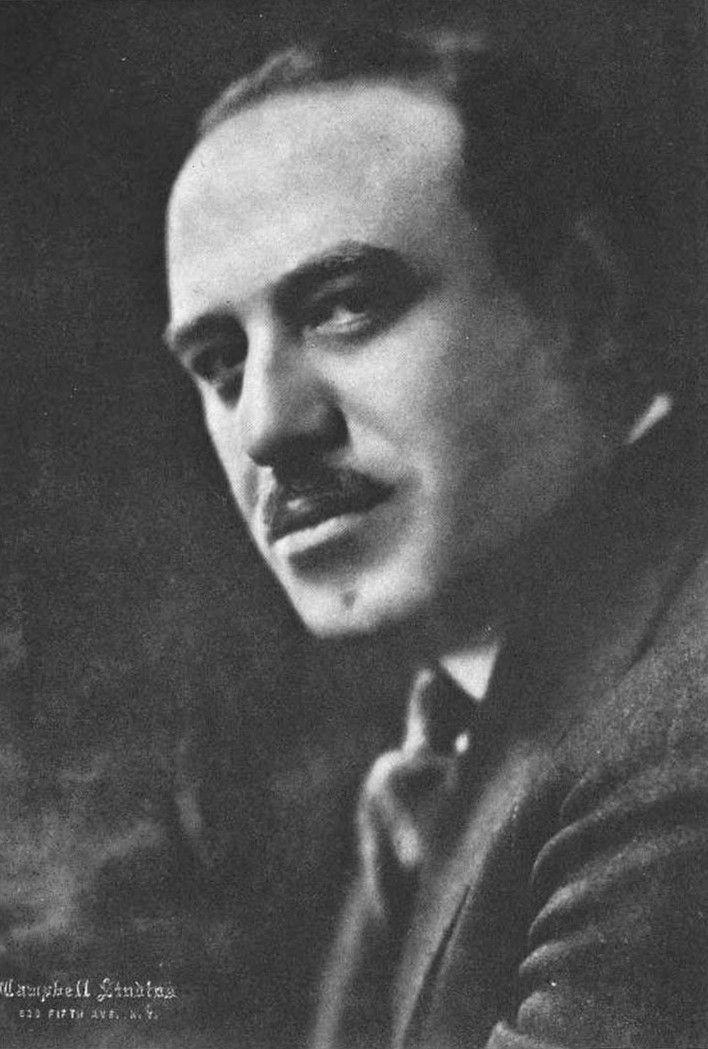
- Vignola, c. 1920
- Born: Rocco Giuseppe Vignola; August 7, 1882; Trivigno, Basilicata, Kingdom of Italy
- Died: October 25, 1953 (aged 71); Hollywood, California, U.S.
- Resting place: St. Agnes Cemetery
- Occupations: Actor, screenwriter, and film director
- Years active: 1906–1937

Robert G. Vignola (born Rocco Giuseppe Vignola, August 7, 1882 – October 25, 1953) was an Italian-American actor, screenwriter, and film director. A former stage actor, he appeared in many motion pictures produced by Kalem Company and later moved to directing, becoming one of the silent screen's most prolific directors. He directed a handful of films in the early years of sound films, but his career essentially ended in the silent era.

== Early life ==
Vignola was born on August 7, 1882, in Trivigno, a village in the province of Potenza, Basilicata, to Donato Gaetano Vignola, a stonemason, and Anna Rosa Rago. It is unsure why he used August 5 as his birthday in America. He had two brothers and three sisters, his oldest sister having died at the age of 19 months in Italy. Travelling with his mother and siblings, he left Italy in May 1886, at the age of three. He was raised in Albany, New York. Because of his Christian name of Rocco he was nicknamed "Rocky" on the family's first census in New York. His name Rocco was later changed to Robert. Trained as a barber in his youth, Vignola by age 14 became interested in the circus, practicing contortion and slackwire. Three years later, in 1899, he found his true vocation—acting—and the following year in Albany he established a small performance company that he named "The Empire Dramatic Club".

== Acting career ==
In 1901 he started acting on stage professionally and joined the "American Stock Company" in New York. He made his stage debut in Romeo and Juliet, performing with Eleanor Robson Belmont and Kyrle Bellew. In the following years he played leads and became a character actor. Vignola's motion picture career began in 1906 with the short film The Black Hand, directed by Wallace McCutcheon and produced by Biograph Company, generally considered the film that launched the mafia genre.

In 1907 he joined Kalem Studios, starring in numerous movies directed by his long-time friend Sidney Olcott often dealing with Irish culture such as The Lad from Old Ireland (1910), The Colleen Bawn (1911), and Arrah-na-Pogue (1911). Olcott would later promote him to assistant director. The Kalem Company traveled across Europe and Middle East, where Vignola did one of his most notable roles as Judas Iscariot in From the Manger to the Cross (1912), among the most acclaimed films of the silent years. According to Moving Picture World, he was the first actor who was placed upon a permanent salary by Kalem.

== Directing career ==
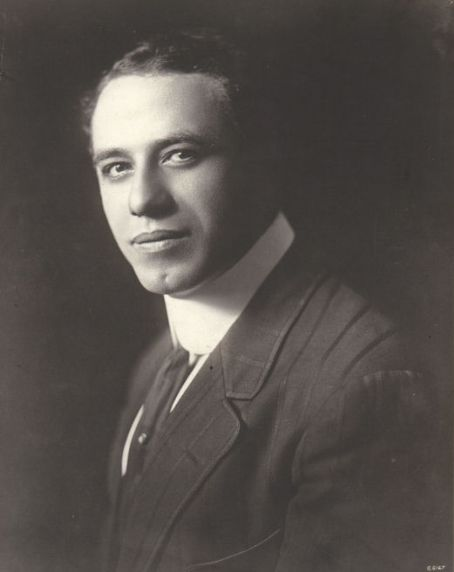
Vignola, early 1910s

Vignola directed 110 pictures from 1911 to 1937. His debut as a film director was Rory O'More (1911), co-directed with Olcott. The Vampire (1913), starring Alice Hollister, was well received by critics and is sometimes cited as the earliest surviving "vamp" movie (another title with the same name produced by William Nicholas Selig in 1910 is considered lost). He returned to the theme with The Vampire's Trail (1914), featuring Alice Joyce, Tom Moore and Hollister in a secondary role. He had a long association directing the early movies of Pauline Frederick such as Audrey (1916), Double Crossed (1917), and The Love That Lives (1917).

Vignola is best known for directing Marion Davies in several romantic comedies, including Enchantment (1921), Beauty's Worth (1922), and the big-budget epic When Knighthood Was in Flower (1922), which achieved critical and commercial acclaim and established Davies as a movie star. In 1920, he was offered the role of director-general for the Kinkikan Cinematograph Company in Japan and was honored as "outstanding director of the year" by Frederick James Smith of the Motion Picture Classic in 1921. The Woman God Changed (1921) and Adam and Eva (1923) were praised for the "innovative" use of shadows and lighting effects.

With the arrival of the sound era, he directed Broken Dreams (1933), in competition for the Best Foreign Film at the 2nd Venice International Film Festival, and The Scarlet Letter (1934), the last film of Colleen Moore. His sound films were not successful, and Vignola retired. His final film work was The Girl from Scotland Yard (1937). Later that year, he directed The Pilgrimage Play (live play in Los Angeles, not the related movie.). Vignola was associated with the play at least to 1944.

== Death ==
Vignola died in Hollywood, California in 1953. He was buried in St. Agnes Cemetery in Menands, New York.

== Personal life ==
He lived in a mansion at Whitley Heights owned by William Randolph Hearst. According to legend, Hearst's mistress Marion Davies was allowed to stay without him at Vignola's mansion, worried that she was having affairs and considering Vignola a trusted companion for her as he was homosexual. Sidney Olcott, alone after the passing of his wife Valentine Grant, spent his later life at Vignola's home, where he died in 1949.

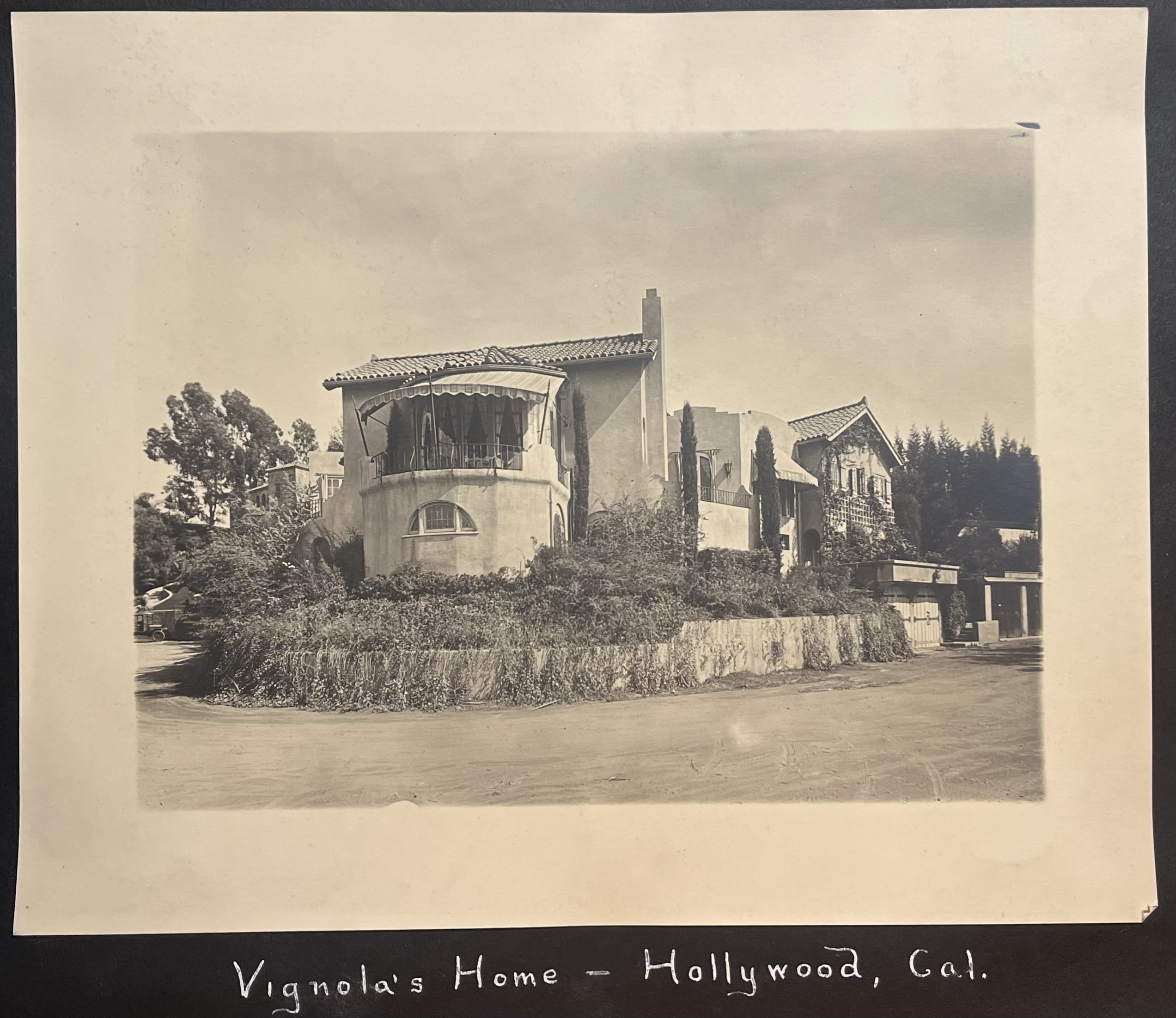
Vignola's album of photos from his home. Included in the album is a photo of him with the writing: "To Joe and May. With a few glimpses of my home. Best wishes always. From your brother Bob Oct 19, 1927"

Vignola was described by Delight Evans as "the sanest and least temperamental of all celluloid creators. He has infinite patience. He has one quality which makes actors want to work for him: consideration." He once said: "Before a director can learn to control thousands of people and big stars and big scenes, he must first learn to control himself." He identified himself as a Republican, although he was not much interested in politics. Vignola visited his birthplace Trivigno with his family, provided money to build the town's war monument and maintained correspondence with some of his relatives.

== Partial filmography ==
=== Actor ===
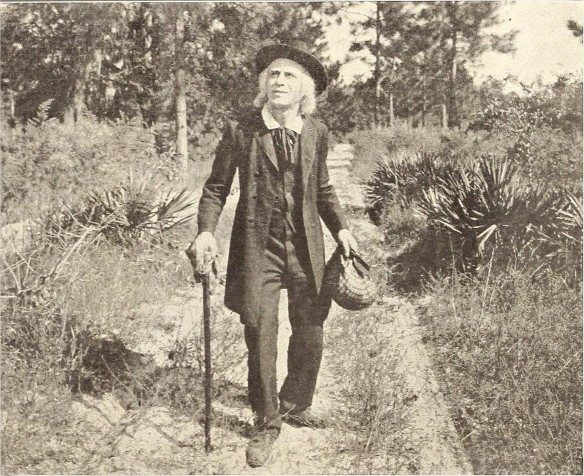
Vignola in The Stranger (1910)

- The Black Hand (1906)
- A Runaway Sleighbelle (1907)
- The Fight for Freedom (1908)
- The Kentuckian (1908)
- The Navajo's Bride (1910)
- A Lad from Old Ireland (1910)
- The Stranger (1910)
- A War Time Escape (1911)
- Arrah-na-Pogue (1911)
- Rory O'More (1911)
- The Colleen Bawn (1911)
- The O'Neill (1912)
- His Mother (1912)
- The O'Kalems Visit Killarney (1912)
- The Vagabonds (1912)
- Far From Erin's Isle (1912)
- You Remember Ellen (1912)
- A Prisoner of the Harem (1912)
- An Arabian Tragedy (1912)
- From the Manger to the Cross (1912)
- Missionaries in Darkest Africa (1912)
- The O'Neill (1912)
- The Fighting Dervishes of the Desert (1912)
- The Shaughraun (1912)
- A Sawmill Hazard (1913)
- A Desperate Chance (1913)
- The Lady Peggy's Escape (1913)
- The Octoroon (1913)
- The Scimitar of the Prophet (1913)
- The Wives of Jamestown (1913)

=== Director ===
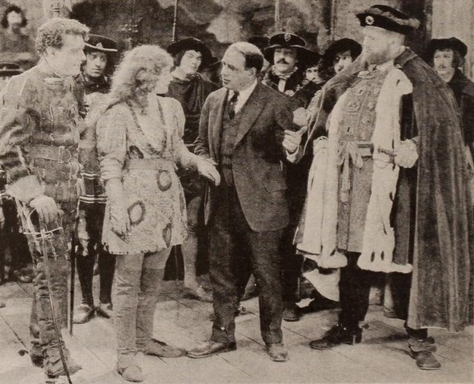
L-R: Forrest Stanley, Marion Davies, Vignola, and Lyn Harding on the set of When Knighthood Was in Flower, 1922

- Rory O'More (1911)
- The Vampire (1913)
- The Barefoot Boy (1914)
- The Vampire's Trail (1914)
- The Siren's Reign (1915)
- Audrey (1916)
- Seventeen (1916)
- The Evil Thereof (1916)
- The Moment Before (1916)
- The Spider (1916)
- Under Cover (1916)
- Great Expectations (1917)
- Her Better Self (1917)
- The Fortunes of Fifi (1917)
- The Hungry Heart (1917)
- The Love That Lives (1917)
- Double Crossed (1917)
- Madame Jealousy (1918)
- The Claw (1918)
- The Savage Woman (1918)
- The Girl Who Came Back (1918)
- Women's Weapons (1918)
- His Official Fiancée (1919)
- Experimental Marriage (1919)
- More Deadly Than The Male (1919)
- The Heart of Youth (1919)
- The Thirteenth Commandment (1920)
- The World and His Wife (1920)
- Straight Is the Way (1921)
- The Woman God Changed (1921)
- Enchantment (1921)
- Beauty's Worth (1922)
- The Young Diana (1922)
- When Knighthood Was in Flower (1922)
- Adam and Eva (1924)
- Yolanda (1924)
- Married Flirts (1924)
- The Way of a Girl (1925)
- Déclassée (1925)
- Fifth Avenue (1926)
- Cabaret (1927)
- The Red Sword (1929)
- Broken Dreams (1933)
- The Scarlet Letter (1934)
- The Perfect Clue (1935)
- The Girl from Scotland Yard (1937)
