= When Knighthood Was in Flower =

When Knighthood Was in Flower may refer to:

- When Knighthood Was in Flower (novel), the debut novel of American author Charles Major
- When Knighthood Was in Flower (play), 1901 play by Paul Kester based on the novel
- When Knighthood Was in Flower (1922 film), a 1922 silent historical film based on the novel
- The Sword and the Rose, a 1953 film based on the novel, also known as When Knighthood Was in Flower in the United Kingdom
