= Seeing Things =

Seeing Things or Seein' Things may refer to:

- Hallucination, a perception in the absence of a stimulus

== Film and television ==
- Seein' Things (1924 film), a silent comedy short film
- Seein' Things (1908 film), a French short silent comedy film
- Seeing Things (1930 film), a film directed by Harold Beaudine
- Seeing Things (TV series), a 1980s Canadian series
- "Seeing Things" (Corner Gas), an episode of Corner Gas
- "Seeing Things" (Covies), an episode of the web series Covies

== Literature and art ==
- Seeing Things (poetry collection), a 1991 poetry collection by Seamus Heaney
- Seeing Things, a 1920 play by Margaret Mayo and Aubrey Kennedy
- Seeing Things: Television in the Age of Uncertainty, a 2000 book by John Ellis
- Seeing Things, a 2000 autobiography by Oliver Postgate
- Seeing Things, a 2005 art book by Jim Woodring
- "Seeing Things", a short story by Ian Rankin, included in his 1992 collection A Good Hanging and Other Stories
- "Seeing Things", a 1944–1969 column in The Saturday Review by the drama critic John Mason Brown

== Music ==
- Seeing Things (album), an album by Jakob Dylan
- "Seeing Things", a song by Aaron Lines from Waitin' on the Wonderful
- "Seeing Things", a song by Bizzy Bone from Speaking in Tongues
- "Seeing Things", a song by The Black Crowes from Shake Your Money Maker
- "Seeing Things", a song by Zero 7 from The Garden
- "Seein’ Thangs", a song from by DJ Shadow ft. David Banner from The Outsider
- "Seeing Things", a song from the 1963 musical Here's Love
- "Seeing Things", a song from the 1968 musical The Happy Time
