= Ernest Glendinning =

American actor

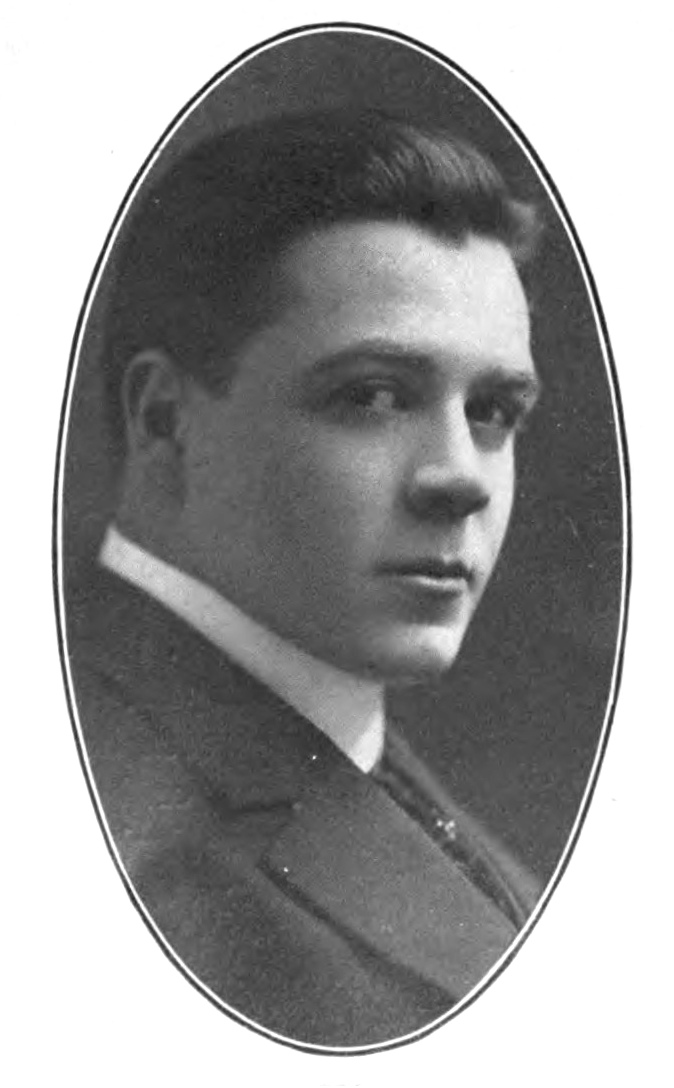
- Born: February 19, 1884; Ulverston, England
- Died: May 17, 1936 (aged 52); South Coventry, Connecticut
- Occupation: Actor
- Spouse: Marie J. Horne

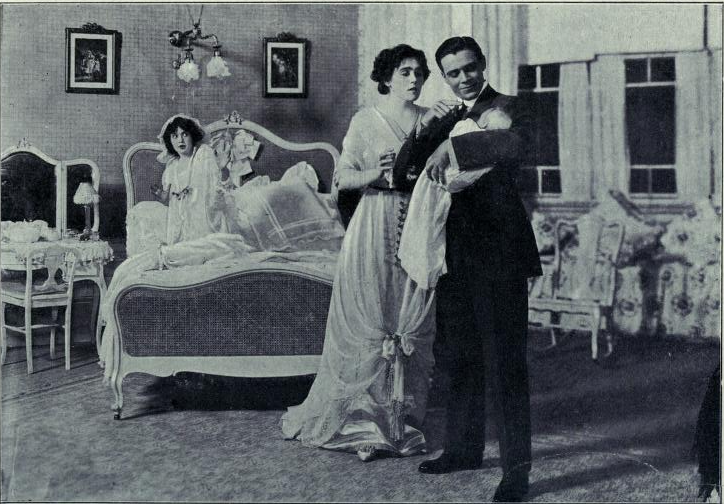
l to r: Marguerite Clark, Ivy Troutman and Ernest Glendinning in 1910 Broadway production Baby Mine

Ernest Glendinning (February 19, 1884 – May 17, 1936) was a British born American actor.

== Biography ==
Glendinning was the son of British-American actors John Glendinning and Clara Braithwaite. In 1907 his father married actress Jessie Millward and she became Ernest's stepmother. Ernest attended Margate College before making his stage debut in 1903 in a walk on part in the Annie Russell play, Mice and Men. His career was devoted primarily to the theatre where he played in vaudeville and on Broadway where he had a lot of successes, especially opposite Marguerite Clark in the stage version of Prunella.

In film he appeared in three films including an early sound short in 1930. He can be seen in the 1922 Marion Davies film When Knighthood Was in Flower.

His sister, Jessie, was the first wife of producer Gilbert Miller.

== Filmography ==
Year	Film	Role	Director	Notes
1915	The Seventh Noon	Peter Donaldson		Silent; Black and White
1922	When Knighthood Was in Flower	Sir Edwin Caskoden	Robert G. Vignola	Silent; Black and White
1930	Grounds for Murder	The Husband	Harold Beaudine	Short; Black and White
1936	The Alchemist's Hourglass	Self	Leo Lipp	Short; Black and White; Documentary
