= Yolanda (film) =

1924 film by Robert G. Vignola

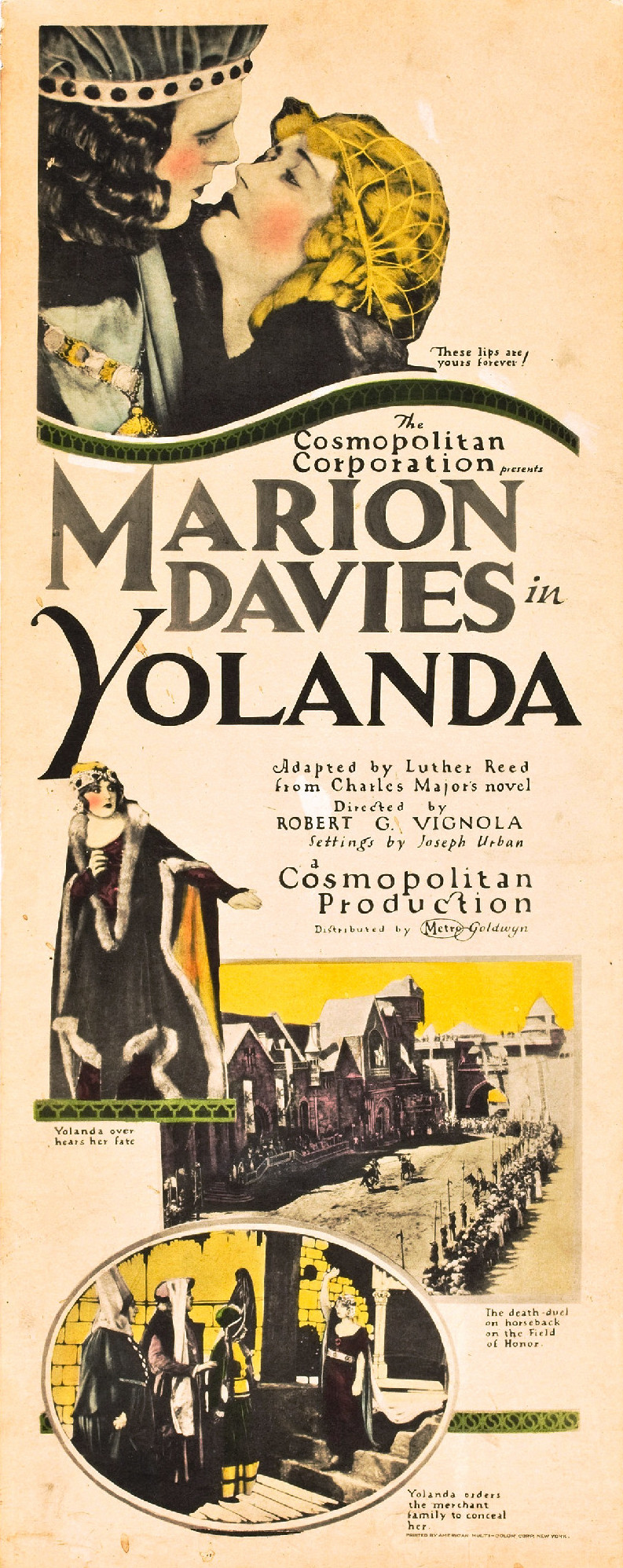
- Theatrical release poster
- Directed by: Robert G. Vignola
- Written by: Luther Reed (screenplay)
- Based on: Yolanda by Charles Major
- Produced by: William Randolph Hearst
- Starring: Marion Davies
- Cinematography: George Barnes; Ira H. Morgan
- Music by: William Frederick Peters
- Distributed by: Metro-Goldwyn (Metro-Goldwyn-Mayer as of May 1924)
- Release dates: February 19, 1924 (premiere); September 15, 1924 (nationwide)
- Running time: 11 reels (10,700 feet)
- Country: United States
- Language: Silent (English intertitles)

Yolanda is a 1924 American silent historical drama film produced by William Randolph Hearst (through his Cosmopolitan Productions) and starring Marion Davies. Robert G. Vignola directed as he had Enchantment (1921) and several other Davies costume films. The film began production as a Metro-Goldwyn film, with the company becoming Metro-Goldwyn-Mayer in May 1924.

This was the second Marion Davies vehicle produced by Cosmopolitan from a Charles Major novel, the first being the phenomenally successful (and expensive) When Knighthood Was in Flower in 1922. Unlike Knighthood, Yolanda was not financially successful.

== Plot ==
As described in a film magazine review, Princess Mary of Burgundy is informed by her father the Duke that she is to marry Maximillian of Styria. Presents are exchanged. The Princess incognito goes to the silk fair and meets and falls in love with a knight who proves to be Maximillian. The later is thrown into the castle dungeon by conspirators and is about to be executed when saved through the intervention of the Princess. Through evil influences the Duke is induced to change his mind regarding a son-in-law and transfers the alliance to one with the half-witted son of the French king. Mary is given over to the care of the French court. Maximillian rescues her and, following the death of the Duke in a battle with the Swiss, is chosen to lead the Burgundians. The wedding of Maximillian and Mary is announced.

== Cast ==
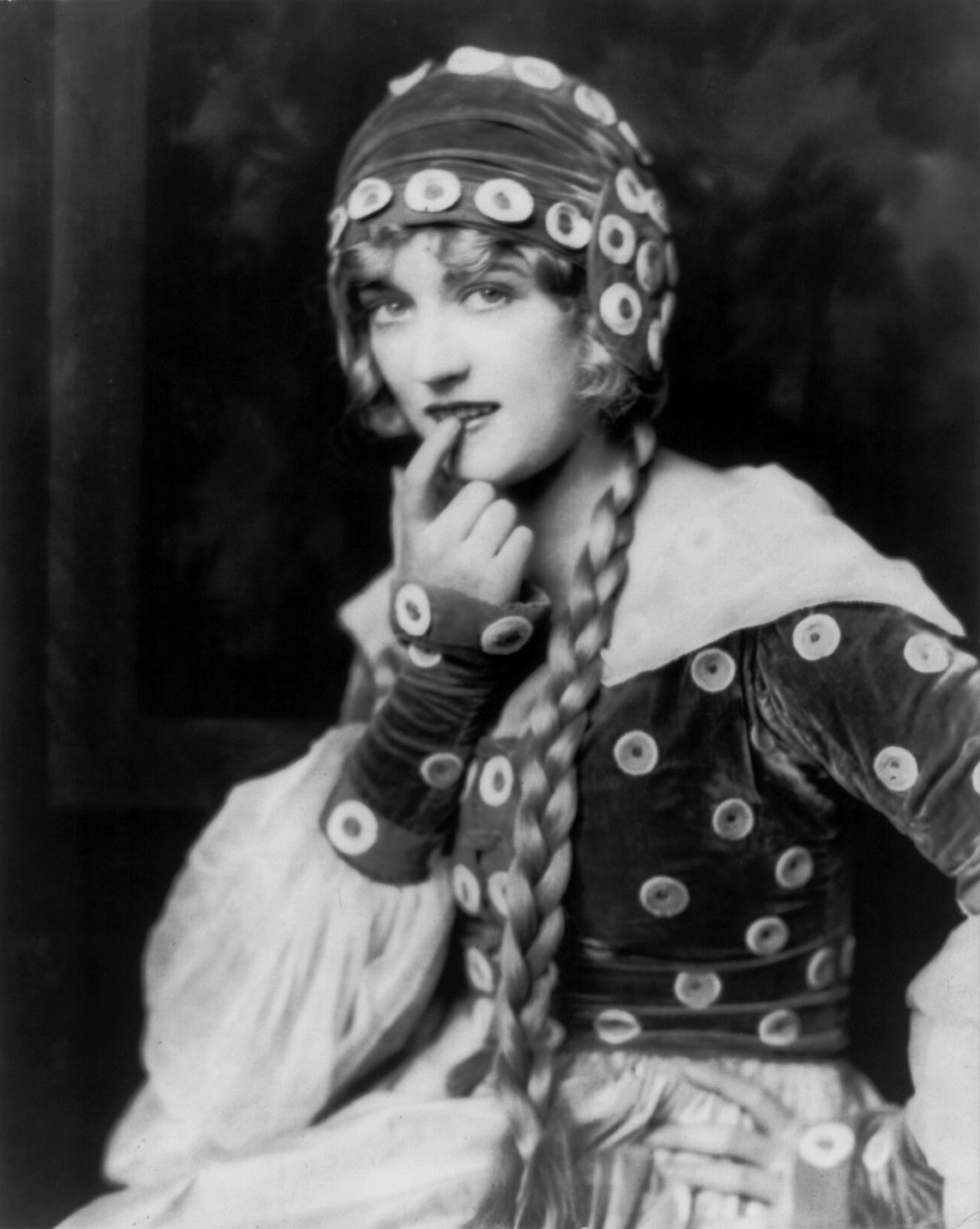
Marion Davies photograph taken by Alfred Cheney Johnston for the film Yolanda

- Marion Davies as Princess Mary / Yolanda
- Lyn Harding as Charles the Bold, Duke of Burgundy
- Holbrook Blinn as King Louis XI of France
- Maclyn Arbuckle as Bishop La Balue
- Johnny Dooley as The Dauphin
- Arthur Donaldson as Lord Bishop
- Ralph Graves as Maximillian of Styria
- Ian Maclaren as Campo Basse
- Gustav von Seyffertitz as Olivier le Daim
- Theresa Maxwell Conover as Queen Margaret (sic)
- Martin Faust as Count Galli
- Thomas Findley as Antoinette's father
- Paul McAllister as Jules d'Humbercourt
- Leon Errol as Innkeeper
- Mary Kennedy as Antoinette Castleman

unbilled

- Roy Applegate as Sir Karl Pitti
- Arthur Tovey
- Kit Wain as Peasant boy

== Production ==
In her 18th film, Marion Davies starred in a dual role: as Princess Mary of Burgundy and as Yolanda. Joseph Urban designed the mammoth sets which covered a city block on 2nd Avenue in New York. Exhibitors Herald reported it was the largest movie set ever built on the East Coast. This was the final Davies film Robert G. Vignola directed. This was also the only pairing of Davies and Ralph Graves. While the film did well in big cities, that success did not extend to small towns and the film was generally considered a failure. It was just too similar to When Knighthood Was in Flower.

== Preservation ==
Yolanda is extant at Cinematheque de Belgique and the Museum of Modern Art and a trailer survives at the Library of Congress.
