= Beaudine =

Beaudine is a surname. Notable people with the surname include:

- Harold Beaudine (1894–1949), American film director, brother of William
- William Beaudine (1892–1970), American film actor and director
