= E. H. Sothern =

American actor (1859–1933)

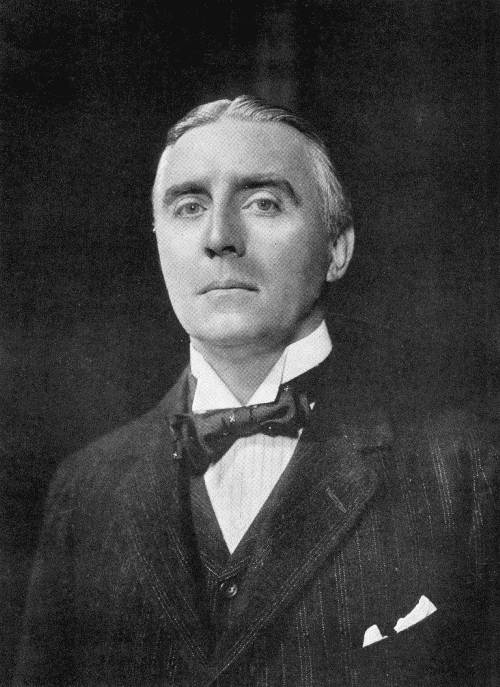
E. H. Sothern

Edward Hugh Sothern (December 6, 1859 – October 28, 1933) was an American actor who specialized in dashing, romantic leading roles and particularly in Shakespeare roles.

== Biography ==
Sothern was born in New Orleans, Louisiana, the son of English actor E. A. Sothern and his wife Frances Emily "Fannie" Stewart (d. 1882). Sothern was educated in England at St Marylebone Grammar School. His brothers and sister all became actors: Lytton Edward Sothern (1851–1887); George Evelyn Augustus T. Sothern (1864–1920), who used the stage name Sam Sothern; and Eva Mary Sothern.

=== Early career and Lyceum years ===
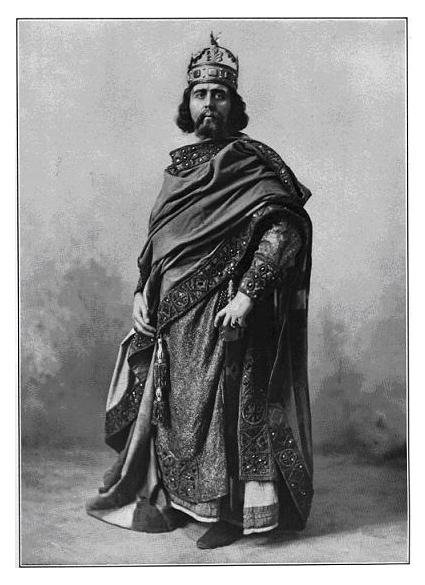
as Macbeth, 1911

Sothern's father had encouraged pursuits other than the stage, but Sothern had already caught the acting bug. His first professional acting appearance was in 1879 as the cabman in an American revival of Brother Sam, a show written by John Oxenford in 1862 for his father, and in which his father played the lead. After playing in Boston and touring in the U.S., he sailed for England, making his London debut in 1881 on a double bill as Mr. Sharpe in False Colours and Marshley Bittern in Out of the Hunt. The next year, he played Arthur Spoonbill in Fourteen Days and then toured in Britain with Charles Wyndham's company.

In 1883, he returned to the U.S. and toured first with John McCullough and then Helen Barry. Back in New York, in 1884, he played Eliphaz Tresham in The Fatal Letter, Melchizidec Flighty in Whose Are They?, which he wrote himself, and in Nita's First. The next year, he was Alfred Vane in Favette, Knolly in Mona, John in In Chancery and Jules in A Moral Climate. He was hired by Charles and Daniel Frohman in the stock company of the old Lyceum Theatre in New York, where he starred as a leading man for the next twelve years. He made a hit as the lovesick auctioneer in the romantic comedy The Highest Bidder (1887). He was especially known for his heroic portrayal of Rudolph Rassendyl in the first stage adaptation of The Prisoner of Zenda, by Anthony Hope, which he first played in 1895. The role made him a star. In 1896, Sothern married actress Virginia Harned.

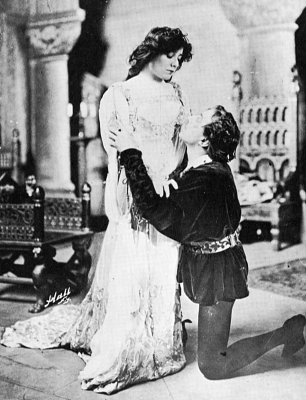
Sothern and Marlowe as Romeo and Juliet, 1904

After he left the Lyceum, he continued in romantic roles in New York. In 1899, he played d'Artagnan in The King's Musketeer, and in 1900 he played Heinrich in The Sunken Bell and Sir Geoffrey Bloomfield in Drifting Apart. For several years, Sothern dreamed of mounting a spectacular and precise production of Hamlet. He finally opened the play in New York in 1900, but during the first week, he was stabbed in the foot by Laertes' sword and was stricken with blood poisoning, closing the production. After he recovered, he revived the piece on tour, but the sets and costumes were destroyed by a fire in Cincinnati, Ohio. In 1901, he played the title role in Richard Lovelace and then François Villon in If I Were King. In 1903, he played the title role in Markheim and Robert, the King of Sicily, in The Proud Prince, after which he toured again.

=== Marlowe and later years ===
In 1904, he began an extremely successful partnership with actress Julia Marlowe, beginning with their appearances as the title roles in Romeo and Juliet, Beatrice and Benedick in Much Ado About Nothing, and the leads in Hamlet. They toured all over the U.S. in these plays, adding The Taming of the Shrew, The Merchant of Venice and Twelfth Night to their repertoire in 1905. Unhappy with their compensation from their manager, Charles Frohman, they continued under the management of the Shubert Brothers, from then on receiving a percentage of the profits. In 1906, together with Marlowe, he played the Duc d'Alençon in Percy MacKaye's Jeanne d'Arc, the title role in Sudermann's John the Baptist and Heinrich in The Sunken Bell, receiving favorable reviews: "He plays the idealist thoughtfully and intelligently.... He plays it with a fire and enthusiasm that approach closely to genius." By this time, Marlowe and Sothern were known as the premier Shakespearean actors in their day. Sothern was particularly admired as Benedick and Malvolio.

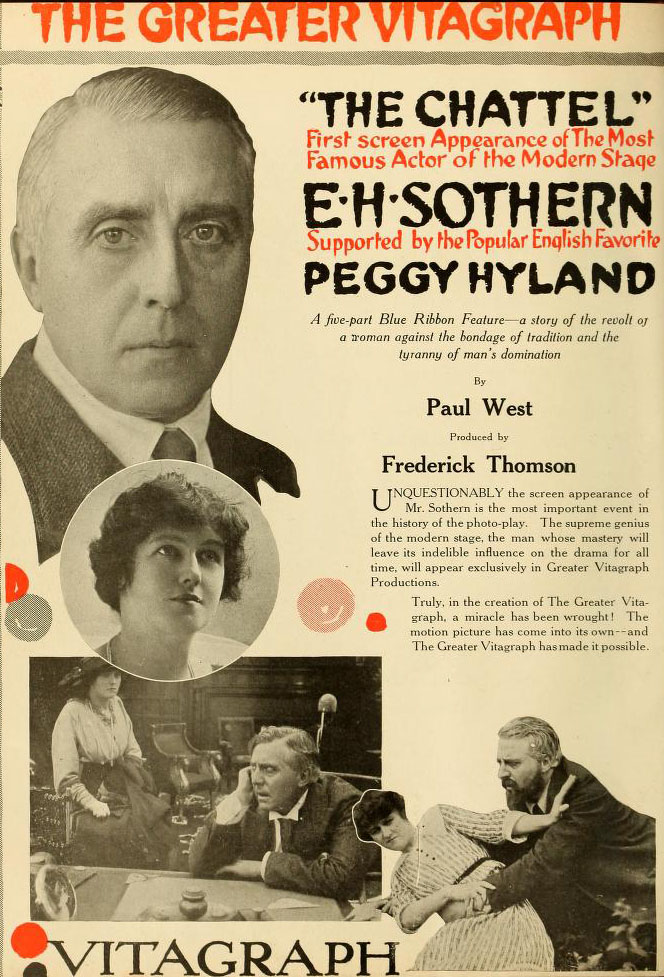
The Chattel (1916)

After another season in New York and then on tour, Sothern, Marlowe and their company crossed the Atlantic to play in London. They were unable to attract audiences in England, however, and returned to America after a season. Back in the U.S., they presented Shakespeare at affordable prices at the Academy of Music in New York, allowing audiences to see the performances who had not previously been able to afford their productions. Marlowe and Sothern dissolved their company and formed separate companies for a time. Sothern played Raskolnikov in Laurence Irving's adaptation of Crime and Punishment, entitled The Fool Hath Said in His Heart. He also starred in Hamlet and If I were King, as well as playing Lord Dundreary, his father's famous role, in Our American Cousin. Also in 1908, he played the title role in Paul Kester's adaptation of Don Quixote that was written especially for him. In 1909, he played the title role in Richelieu.

At the end of 1909, Sothern and Marlowe reunited in Antony and Cleopatra at the New Theatre in New York under the direction of Louis Calvert. In 1910 they toured in Macbeth, receiving enthusiastic notices and bringing the production to New York, where it was a hit. They then continued to tour their Shakespearean repertoire, also playing special performances of the plays for children at schools. Sothern divorced Harned to marry Marlowe in 1911. In 1914, Sothern played the title character in Charlemagne, and the next year he played Jeffery Panton in The Two Virtues and Dundreary in Lord Dundreary. In 1916, he played the title character in David Garrick, a role that his father had created. Sothern appeared in several early films, including The Chattel (1916) and The Man of Mystery (1917). He also wrote about a dozen plays that he appeared in, although most of them are lost.

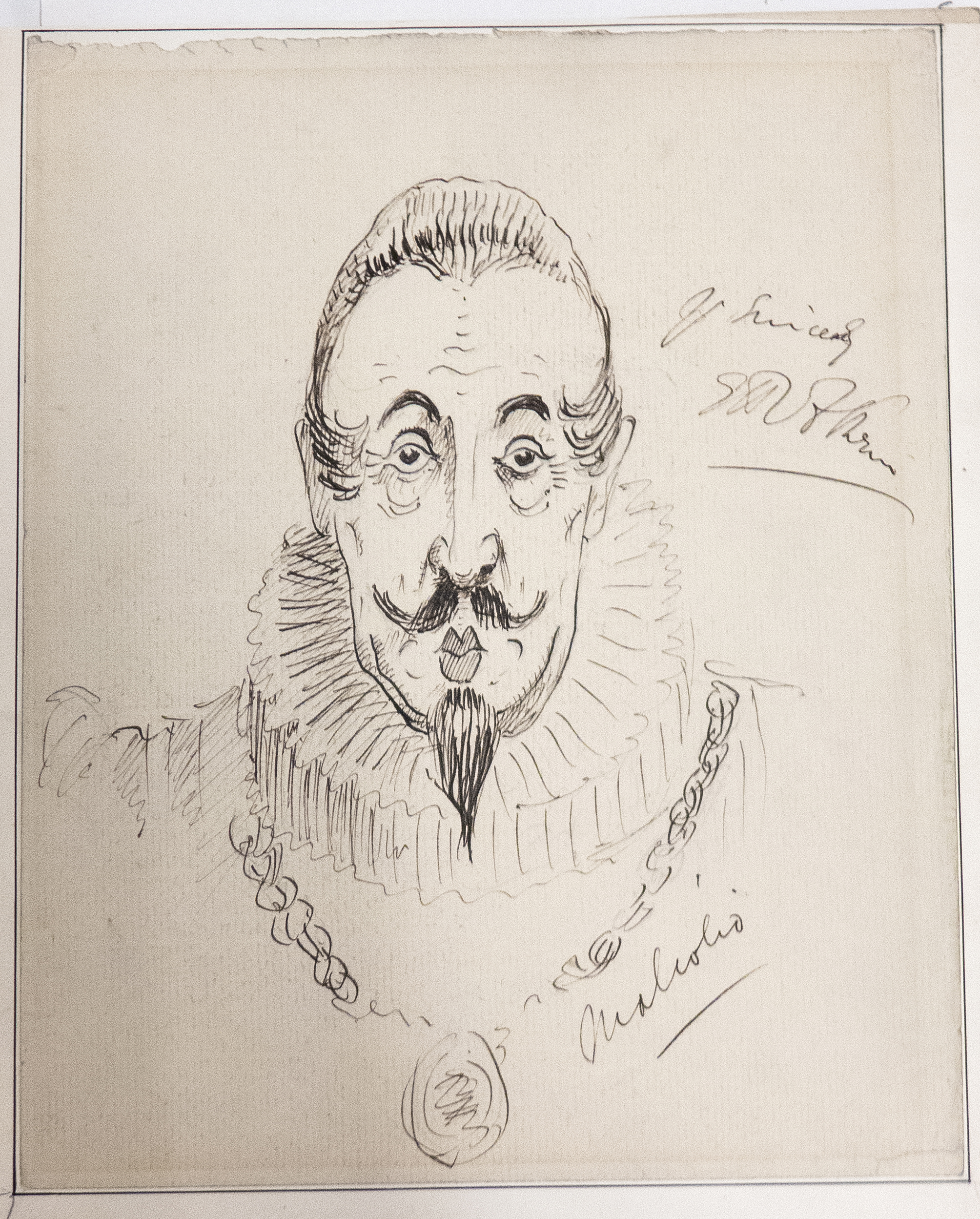
Sothern's self-portrait as Malvolio in "Twelfth Night", 1919

After more touring with Marlowe in Shakespeare, the two brought their production of The Merchant of Venice to New York in 1921. Soon afterwards, Marlowe's health was failing, and she retired in 1924, although she lived until 1950. In 1925, Sothern played Edmund de Verron in Accused, and in 1926, he played Tiburtius in What Never Dies. In 1928, he began to lecture about Shakespeare on successful speaking tours, continuing on the lecture circuit until his death in 1933. He and Marlowe had homes in Luxor, Egypt and Lausanne, Switzerland.

Sothern died in New York City at the Plaza Hotel, of pneumonia, in 1933 at the age of 73 and was cremated.

== Filmography ==
Year	Title	Role	Notes
1916	The Chattel	Blake Waring	
1916	An Enemy to the King	Ernanton de Launay	
1917	The Man of Mystery	David Angelo	
1917	National Red Cross Pageant	England	Final episode, (final film role)

== See also ==
- Matinee idol
