= Dorothy Vernon of Haddon Hall (film) =

1924 film

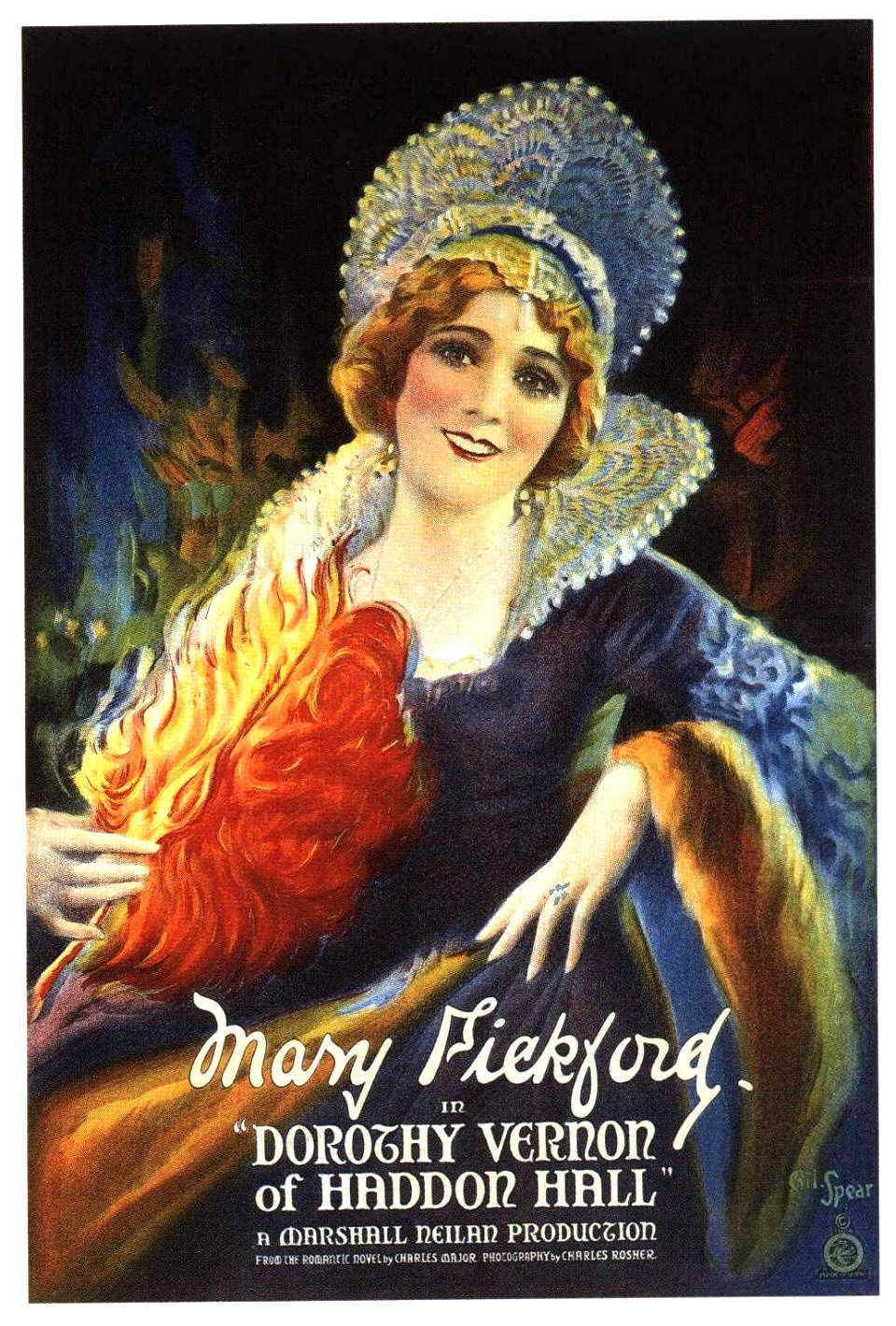
- Theatrical poster
- Directed by: Marshall Neilan
- Written by: Waldemar Young
- Based on: Dorothy Vernon of Haddon Hall by Charles Major
- Produced by: Mary Pickford
- Starring: Mary Pickford
- Cinematography: Charles Rosher
- Production company: Mary Pickford Productions
- Distributed by: United Artists
- Release date: May 25, 1924
- Running time: 135 minutes
- Country: United States
- Language: Silent (English intertitles)
- Budget: $750,000
- Box office: $900,000

Dorothy Vernon of Haddon Hall is a 1924 American silent historical drama film directed by Marshall Neilan and starring Mary Pickford. The script by Waldemar Young was based upon the 1902 novel of the same name by Charles Major.

== Plot ==
In May 1550, two houses were to be united by the betrothal of the son of Rutland and the heiress of Haddon Hall. Sir George Vernon is forfeit to Rutland on his daughter's 18th birthday, for 10 of his 30 manors lying adjacent to Rutland. His daughter Dorothy and John Manners are forced to marry each other on their 18th birthday, but they cannot stand each other. John is in France with Mary Stuart, and George intends to use this as a way for Dorothy to be able to marry her cousin Malcolm Vernon.

On her 18th birthday, Malcolm comes from Scotland for the wedding, and Dorothy has second thoughts about marrying someone she has never met. George is demanded by the Rutland men to forfeit for Dorothy not marrying John. Dorothy is charmed when she meets Malcolm and tells him she has no intention in marrying John. She does not know that Malcolm really is John and when he reveals himself, she is shocked and insulted. She informs her father, and the real Malcolm shows up as well. Dorothy has to point out John, but fears John will be killed and points out Malcolm. John has the time to run away, and Malcolm is revealed to not be John.

Mary Stuart is ordered to England when her ring is found. John has to get her from Scotland, but is afraid Queen Elizabeth will find out. Dorothy has fallen in love with John and meets him several times in the forest and at the castle in disguise. Dorothy tells him she wants for them to elope, but John convinces her to wait. When George catches Dorothy and John together, he is outraged. Malcolm comes in to kill John, but Dorothy stops him and John flees.

John has taken Mary into his home for refuge. George has become wealthy and invites Queen Elizabeth to the wedding. Queen Elizabeth accepts, but orders everyone who assists Mary to be beheaded. Dorothy feels she is a prisoner in her own home and writes John a letter about wanting to elope with him. George gets his hands on the letter and orders John to be hanged. She attempts to escape, but gets caught and imprisoned.

Dorothy agrees to marry Malcolm if John will not be hanged. On her wedding day, Dorothy finds out her father lied to her about hanging John and seeks revenge. She orders her maid Jennie to pursue John to rescue Dorothy. When Jennie arrives at the Rutland Castle, she catches Mary in John's arms and hurries back to Haddon Hall to tell Dorothy. Dorothy is outraged and informs Queen Elizabeth about Mary's whereabouts. Queen Elizabeth announces she will behead the earl of Rutland and John for treason and orders Malcolm and his troops to arrest him. Dorothy feels sorry for John, but is not able to stop the queen.

Dorothy rushed to the Rutland Castle, but is not able to leave Haddon Hall as the gates are closed. Dorothy escapes over the walls and is the first to arrive at Rutland Castle. She warns Mary and finds out John is on his way to Haddon Hall. Dorothy tries to save Mary by dressing up like her. The troops mistake Dorothy for Mary and take her to the queen where Dorothy reveals herself. Queen Elizabeth feels betrayed and demands Dorothy to be taken to jail. John comes to rescue her, but Queen Elizabeth catches them. She decides to release Dorothy and send John away to Wales for one year.

When Dorothy is informed Malcolm and his troops intend to murder Queen Elizabeth, she and John try to save her. This results in Malcolm and John getting into a sword fight. John kills Malcolm and is reunited with Dorothy.

== Cast ==
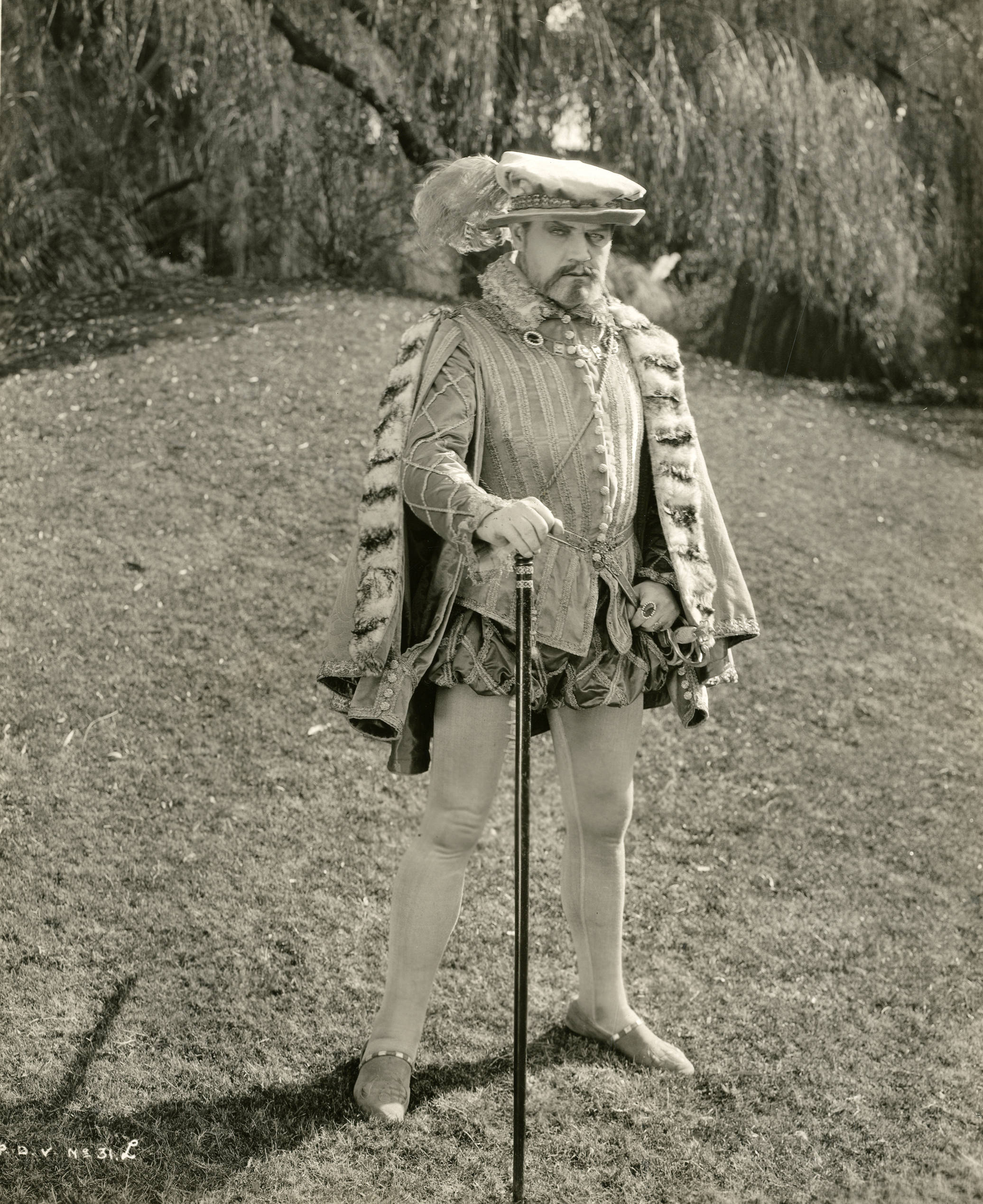
Anders Randolf in the film

- Mary Pickford as Dorothy Vernon
- Anders Randolf as Sir George Vernon
- Marc McDermott as Sir Malcolm Vernon
- Carrie Daumery as Lady Vernon
- Allan Forrest as Sir John Manners
- Lottie Pickford as Jennie Faxton
- Wilfred Lucas as Earl of Rutland
- Clare Eames as Queen Elizabeth
- Estelle Taylor as Mary, Queen of Scots
- Courtenay Foote as Earl of Leicester
- Colin Kenny as Dawson
- Julie Bishop as Child Extra (credited as Jacqueline Wells)
- Roger Byrne as Child (uncredited)
- Marcella Daly (uncredited)
- J.C. Fowler (uncredited)
- Junior Johnston as Little Boy (uncredited)
- Coy Watson (uncredited)

== Production ==
Mary Pickford worked previously with director Ernst Lubitsch on the movie Rosita (1923). They were originally to make this picture together as well, but Lubitsch turned the directing assignment down. Pickford admitting wanting to work with someone else as well.

Pickford wanted to move away from being the 'girl with the curls' and this was the first of her films in this direction and she desperately wanted for this film to be a success. She used a big budget and introduced several special effects. She assigned Marshall Neilan as the director. They had positive memories of working together on previous films, including Stella Maris (1918) and Daddy-Long-Legs (1919). However, they reportedly fought a lot while working on this film. Neilan showed up on set drunk every day, and their longtime friendship eventually was destroyed.

The movie was filmed at the real Haddon Hall. It was the first movie to be shot there, the estate having just been restored four years earlier.

== Reception ==
The public did not like Pickford's change of direction, and the reception was catastrophic.

== Preservation ==
A copy of Dorothy Vernon of Haddon Hall is held by the Mary Pickford Institute for Film Education.

== See also ==
- List of American films of 1924
- Mary Pickford filmography
