= The Sword and the Rose =

1953 film by Ken Annakin

- Theatrical release poster
- Directed by: Ken Annakin
- Screenplay by: Lawrence Edward Watkin
- Based on: When Knighthood Was in Flower (novel) by Charles Major; When Knighthood Was in Flower (play) by James B. Fagan
- Produced by: Perce Pearce; Walt Disney
- Starring: Richard Todd; Glynis Johns
- Cinematography: Geoffrey Unsworth
- Edited by: Gerald Thomas
- Music by: Clifton Parker
- Production company: RKO-Walt Disney British Productions Limited
- Distributed by: RKO Radio Pictures Ltd.
- Release date: July 23, 1953 (United States)
- Running time: 92 minutes
- Countries: United Kingdom; United States
- Language: English
- Budget: $2 million
- Box office: $1 million

The Sword and the Rose is a 1953 adventure film produced by Perce Pearce and Walt Disney and directed by Ken Annakin. The film features the story of Mary Tudor, a younger sister of Henry VIII of England.

Based on the 1898 novel When Knighthood Was in Flower by Charles Major (1856-1913), of Shelbyville, Indiana. It was originally made into an early silent film in 1908 in the Nickelodeon era and again 15 years later in another silent film but with a much longer, more developed plot. The 1953 subsequent Disney version under the different title was further adapted for the screen from Major's 1898 novel by Lawrence Edward Watkin. The film was shot at Denham Film Studios in the United Kingdom and was the third of Disney's British film productions following Treasure Island (1950) and The Story of Robin Hood (1952).

== Plot ==
Mary Tudor falls in love with a new arrival to court, Charles Brandon. She persuades her brother King Henry VIII to make him his Captain of the Guard. Meanwhile, Henry is determined to marry her off to the aging King Louis XII of France as part of a peace agreement. Mary's longtime suitor the Edward Stafford, 3rd Duke of Buckingham takes a dislike to Charles as he is a commoner and the Duke wants Mary for himself. However, troubled by his feelings for the princess, Brandon resigns and decides to sail to the New World. Against the advice of her lady-in-waiting Lady Margaret, Mary dresses up like a boy and follows Brandon to Bristol. Henry's men find them and throw Brandon in the Tower of London. King Henry agrees to spare his life if Mary will marry King Louis and tells her that when Louis dies she is free to marry whomever she wants. Meanwhile, Mary asks the Duke of Buckingham for help but he only pretends to help Brandon escape from the Tower, really planning to have him killed while escaping. The duke thinks he is drowned in the Thames, but he survives.

Mary marries King Louis and encourages him to drink to excess and be active so that his already deteriorating health worsens. His heir Francis makes it clear that he will not return Mary to England after the king's death, but keep her for himself. When she goes to him for help, the Duke of Buckingham tells Lady Margaret that Brandon is dead and decides to go "rescue" Mary himself. Lady Margaret discovers that Brandon is alive and learning of the duke's treachery they hurry back to France. Louis dies and the Duke of Buckingham arrives in France to bring Mary back to England. He tells her that Brandon is dead and tries to force her to marry him. Charles arrives in time, rescues her and wounds the duke in a duel. Mary and Brandon are married and remind Henry of his promise to let her pick her second husband. He forgives them and makes Charles Duke of Suffolk.

== Cast ==
- Glynis Johns as Mary Tudor
- Richard Todd as Charles Brandon, 1st Duke of Suffolk
- James Robertson Justice as King Henry VIII
- Michael Gough as Edward Stafford, Duke of Buckingham
- Jane Barrett as Lady Margaret
- Peter Copley as Sir Edwin Caskoden
- Rosalie Crutchley as Queen Catherine of Aragon
- D. A. Clarke-Smith as Cardinal Thomas Wolsey
- Ernest Jay as Lord Chamberlain
- Bryan Coleman as Thomas Howard, Earl of Surrey
- Jean Mercure as King Louis XII
- Gérard Oury as Dauphin Francis of France
- Fernand Fabre as DeLongueville
- Gaston Richer as Antoine Duprat
- Helen Goss as Princess Claude
- Patrick Cargill as French Diplomat
- Anthony Sharp as French Diplomat
- Richard Molinas as Father Pierre

== Production ==
At the end of 1948, funds from Walt Disney Productions stranded in foreign countries, including the United Kingdom, exceeded $8.5 million. Walt Disney decided to create a studio in Britain, RKO-Walt Disney British Productions, Ltd. in association with RKO Radio Pictures and started production of Treasure Island (1950). With the success of Robin Hood and His Merrie Men (1952), Disney wanted to keep the production team to make a second film; he chose The Sword and the Rose inspired by the novel When Knighthood Was in Flower (1898) by Charles Major. This team consisted of the director Ken Annakin, producer Douglas Pierce, writer Lawrence Edward Watkin, and the artistic director Carmen Dillon.

The film was officially announced in June 1952. In July the title was changed from When Knighthood was in Flower to The Sword and the Rose.

At the beginning of production, Annakin and Dillon went to Disney Studios in Burbank in order to develop the script and set the stage with storyboards, a technique used by Annakin on production of Robin Hood. During this step, each time a batch of storyboards was finished, it was presented to Walt Disney who commented and brought his personal touch. Annakin was granted great freedom with the dialogue.

Walt Disney came to oversee the production of the film in the UK from June to September 1952. The team spent several months researching period details to make the film more realistic. Working in pre-production had helped reduce the need for natural settings in favor of studio sets designed by Peter Ellenshaw. Ellenshaw painted sets for 62 different scenes in total. According to Leonard Maltin, Ellenshaw's work was such that it is sometimes impossible to tell where the painting ends and reality begins.

Annakin later wrote: "I had learned on Robin Hood that if you agreed to work for Walt, you must sublimate some of your own opinions and judgements and faithfully try to interpret the Master’s vision. He paid well, provided wonderful sets, actors and costumes, and clearly knew what his public wanted. Every time he came on to the set and concentrated on what I was doing, he would pick out something which might be elaborated or improved on — always something no one else had thought of. This was part of his show-biz genius."

Filming began in July 1952 at Pinewood Studios.

Richard Todd was thrown from a horse while filming the trailer and was in bed for three weeks. There was a "go slow" strike at the studio during production.

It was distributed by RKO under a new arrangement between that film and Disney.

== Reception ==
The film's budget exceeded that of Robin Hood and His Merrie Men, but it earned only $2.5 million.

The film disappointed at the US box office but did better in other countries. However, the relative failure of this and Rob Roy: The Highland Rogue caused Disney to become less enthusiastic about costume pictures.

From January 4–11, 1956, it was broadcast on American television as episodes 36–37 of Disney's Sunday night anthology program Disneyland on ABC-TV, serialised in two parts under the title of the original source material.

== Analysis ==
Leonard Maltin surmised that The Sword and the Rose is historically equivalent to Pinocchio (1940) although it remains primarily a dramatic entertainment featuring costumed actors. However, it was greeted coolly in the UK mainly because of its historical approximations despite reviews from The Times that said that Mary Tudor (Glynis Johns) had "remarkably alive moments" and James Robertson Justice's King Henry VIII had "a royal air". On the other side of the Atlantic in the United States, The New York Times reviewed the film as "a time consuming tangle of mild satisfaction". Despite these criticisms, the team responsible for the film was reassembled for another film Rob Roy, the Highland Rogue.

Peter Ellenshaw's work on set allowed him to get a "lifetime contract" with the Disney studio. He moved to the United States after the shooting of 20,000 Leagues Under the Sea (1954).

Douglas Brode draws a parallel between The Sword and the Rose and Lady and the Tramp (then in production) in which two female characters of noble lineage are enamored of a poor male character.

Steven Watts sees The Sword and the Rose and Rob Roy as showing the Disney studio's concern for individual liberty fighting against powerful social structures and governments. He is joined in this opinion by Douglas Brode. Brode sees the film and the ball scene, not as a conservative, but as an incentive to "dance crazes" (as the twist) for the American youth of the 1950s and 1960s. The ballroom dancing bears more resemblance to a dance competition in the 1950s than to a minuet of pre-Elizabethan England. Brode sees a form of rebel involvement. The proximity of the dancers, and rhythms not resemble the flip is introduced to the court by Mary Tudor near the rebellious teenager. Moreover, Henry VIII took advantage of the proximity afforded by this dance to flirt with a young lady of his court. Brode cites the reply of Mary to the older Catherine of Aragon (Rosalie Crutchley), who is shocked by this dance: "Shall I not have what music and dances I like at my own ball?". Brode said that two years later rock and roll would similarly upset the American nation.

== Historical inaccuracies ==
There are many historical inaccuracies in the film. Charles Brandon was actually a childhood friend of King Henry and not a newcomer to court as is depicted in the film; he had already received the title of Duke of Suffolk from Henry in 1514. Furthermore, the couple's aborted attempt to sail to the New World never happened; indeed, this is an anachronism as the earliest serious English attempts at North American colonization would only occur under Queen Elizabeth I, some fifty years later. It was Brandon and not Edward Stafford, 3rd Duke of Buckingham who escorted Mary back to England after the death of Louis XII. The duke's involvement is purely fictitious and his wife Eleanor Percy is eliminated entirely from the story.

Mary Tudor married King Louis XII without much protest. After his passing, Charles Brandon was sent to France to bring her back to England. They married in France in 1515, shortly after Louis' passing, without King Henry's permission. This was treason at the time since a member of the royal family could not marry without the King's permission. Henry quickly forgave them since he was extremely close to both Charles and his younger sister.

Queen Catherine of Aragon is portrayed as at odds with Princess Mary Tudor; in reality, Catherine and Mary were very close friends.

The Duke of Buckingham is also referred to as a Plantagenet, however, the real Buckingham's closest Plantagenet ancestor was his great-great grandmother, Anne of Gloucester. In contrast, Mary Tudor's nearest Plantagenet ancestor was her mother, the Plantagenet heiress Elizabeth of York.

King Henry is portrayed as a middle-aged and corpulent figure, although at the time he was only 23. His wife Catherine of Aragon is also shown as a brunette although she was a redhead.

== Comics ==
The film was adapted to comics twice. The first adaptation was a newspaper strip published by King Features Syndicate which ran from June 21 to October 25, 1953 for 19 installments as part of Walt Disney's Treasury of Classic Tales, the strip was written by Frank Reilly with art drawn by Jesse Marsh; the other was a comic book published by Dell Comics as issue #505 of Four Color (October 1953), consisting of 34 pages with artwork by Dick Rockwell, with a one page foreword, introduction, preface and afterword. The book version was later reprinted three years later as Four Color #682 (February 1956), retitled back to When Knighthood Was in Flower like the film and to tie-in with the film's inaugural television broadcast.

== See also ==
- Cultural depictions of Henry VIII

== Citation ==
- Annakin, Ken (2001). So you wanna be a director?. Tomahawk Press. ISBN 978-0-9531926-5-6.
