= Julia Marlowe =

American actress (1865–1950)

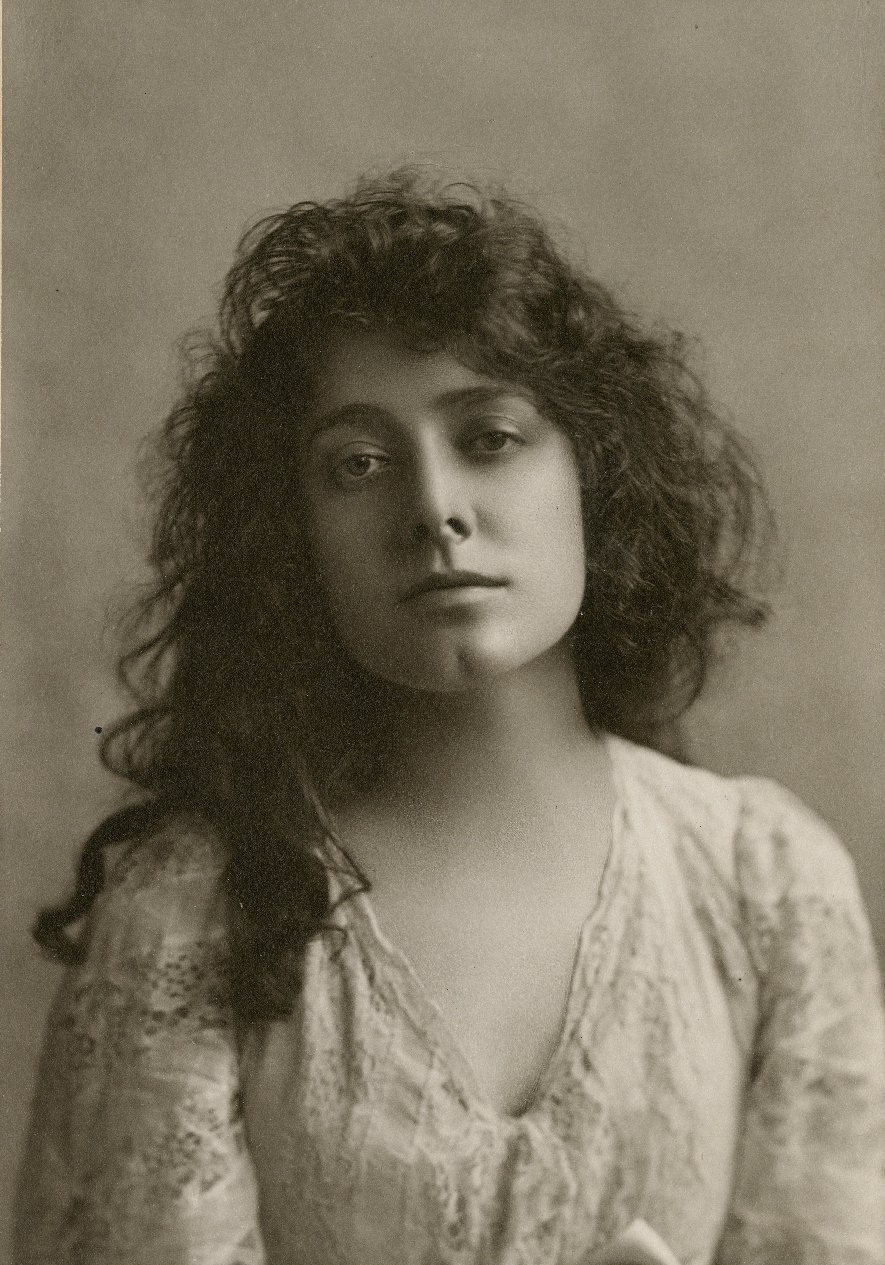
- Julia Marlowe in Colinette (1899)
- Born: Sarah Frances Frost; August 17, 1865; Cumberland, England
- Died: November 12, 1950 (aged 85); New York City, U.S.
- Occupation: Stage actress
- Spouse(s): Robert Taber (1894–1900); E. H. Sothern (1911–1933; his death)

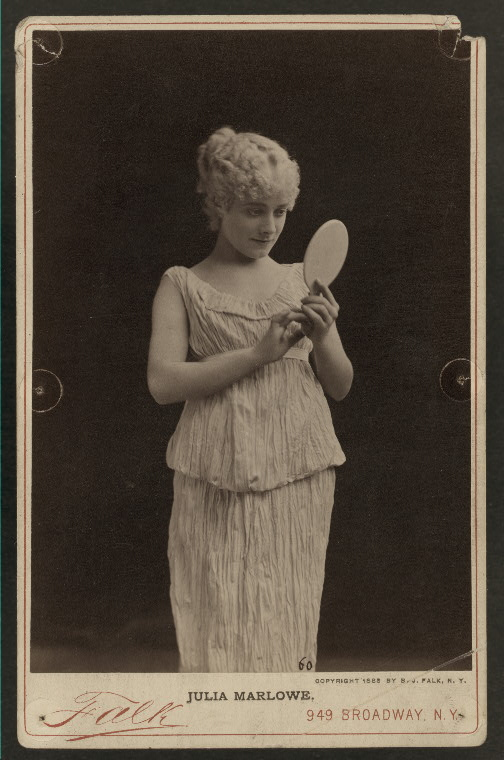
Marlowe in Pygmalion and Galatea

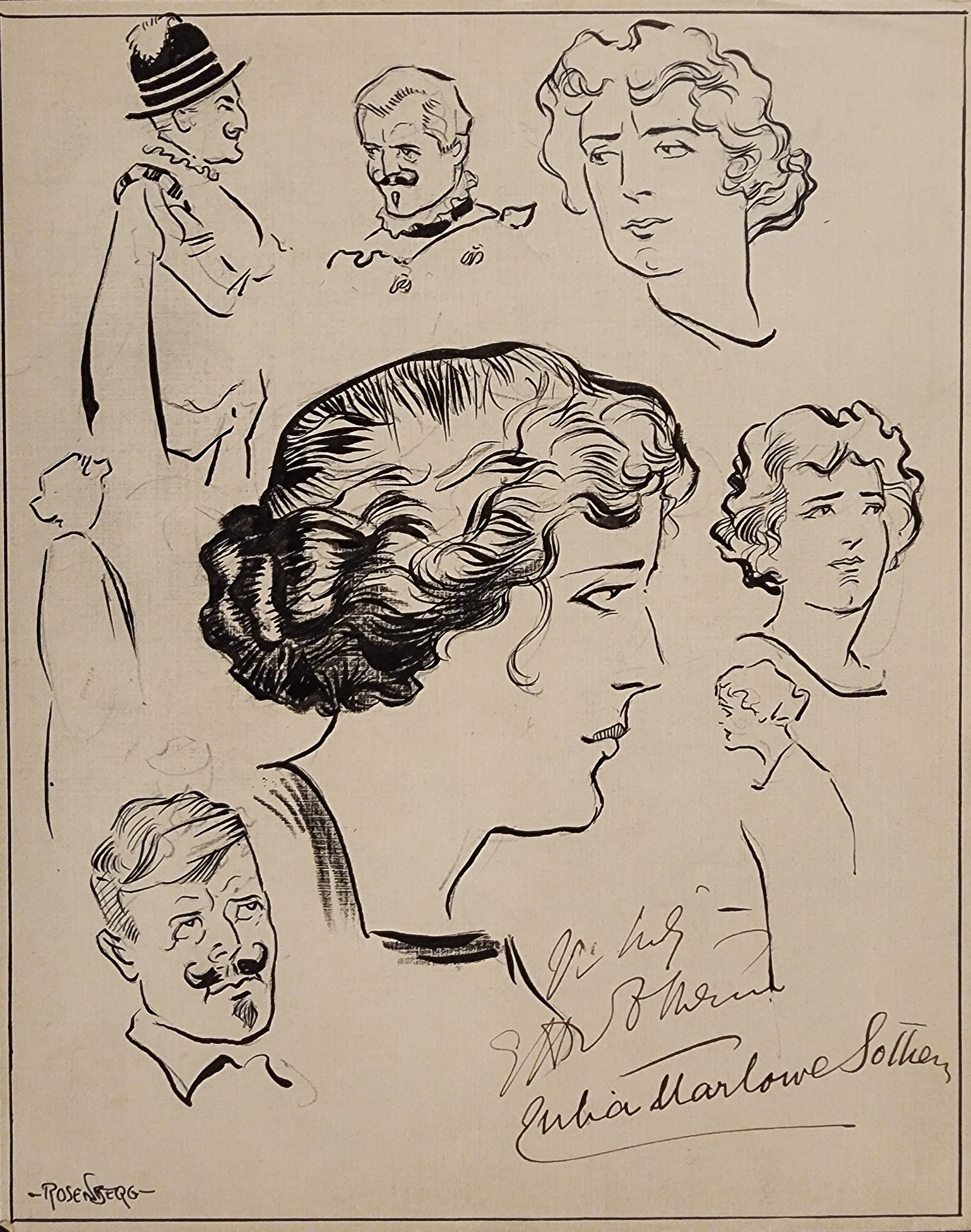
Signed drawing of Julia Marlowe by Manuel Rosenberg for the Cincinnati Post 1919

Julia Marlowe (born Sarah Frances Frost; August 17, 1865 – November 12, 1950) was an English-born American actress, known for her interpretations of William Shakespeare's plays.

== Life and career ==
Marlowe was born as Sarah Frances Frost, on August 17, 1865, at Caldbeck, England, to clogger and shoemaker John Frost and Sarah (Strong) Hodgson. When she was four her family emigrated to the United States. Her father, who was an avid fan of local sports, "fled to America in 1870 under the erroneous impression that he had destroyed a neighbour's eye by flicking a whip at him during a race." He changed his name to Brough and after first settling in Kansas he moved his family east to Portsmouth, Ohio and then Cincinnati.

=== Early career ===
Marlowe obtained the nickname of "Fanny" and in her early teens began her career in the chorus of a juvenile opera company. While touring with the company for nearly a year performing Gilbert and Sullivan's H.M.S. Pinafore (1879), under the direction of Colonel Robert E.J. Miles (manager of the Cincinnati Opera House) she was given the part of Sir Joseph Porter. She later played in W. S. Gilbert's Pygmalion and Galatea.

Her training and initial success was due primarily to Miles's sister-in-law Ada Dow. Still in Cincinnati, Fanny played her first Shakespearean roles as Balthazar in Romeo and Juliet and as Maria in Twelfth Night. She was billed as Fanny Brough. Soon after, Ada Dow took Fanny to New York where for several years she received voice training by Parsons Price. Finished with the voice training she changed her name to Julia Marlowe. As an unknown, Marlowe was, at first, unable to get a Shakesperean role, but she was determined. Colonel Miles, the new manager of the New York Bijou Opera House, gave her the opportunity to play for two weeks on tour in New England, starting in New London, Connecticut. This gave Marlowe the repertoire she needed. On 20 October 1887, her mother hired the Bijou for a matinee of Ingomar the Barbarian (Maria Lovell's adaptation of Friedrich Halm's Der Sohn der Wildnis), in which Marlowe received acclaim which served as a stepping stone to Broadway.

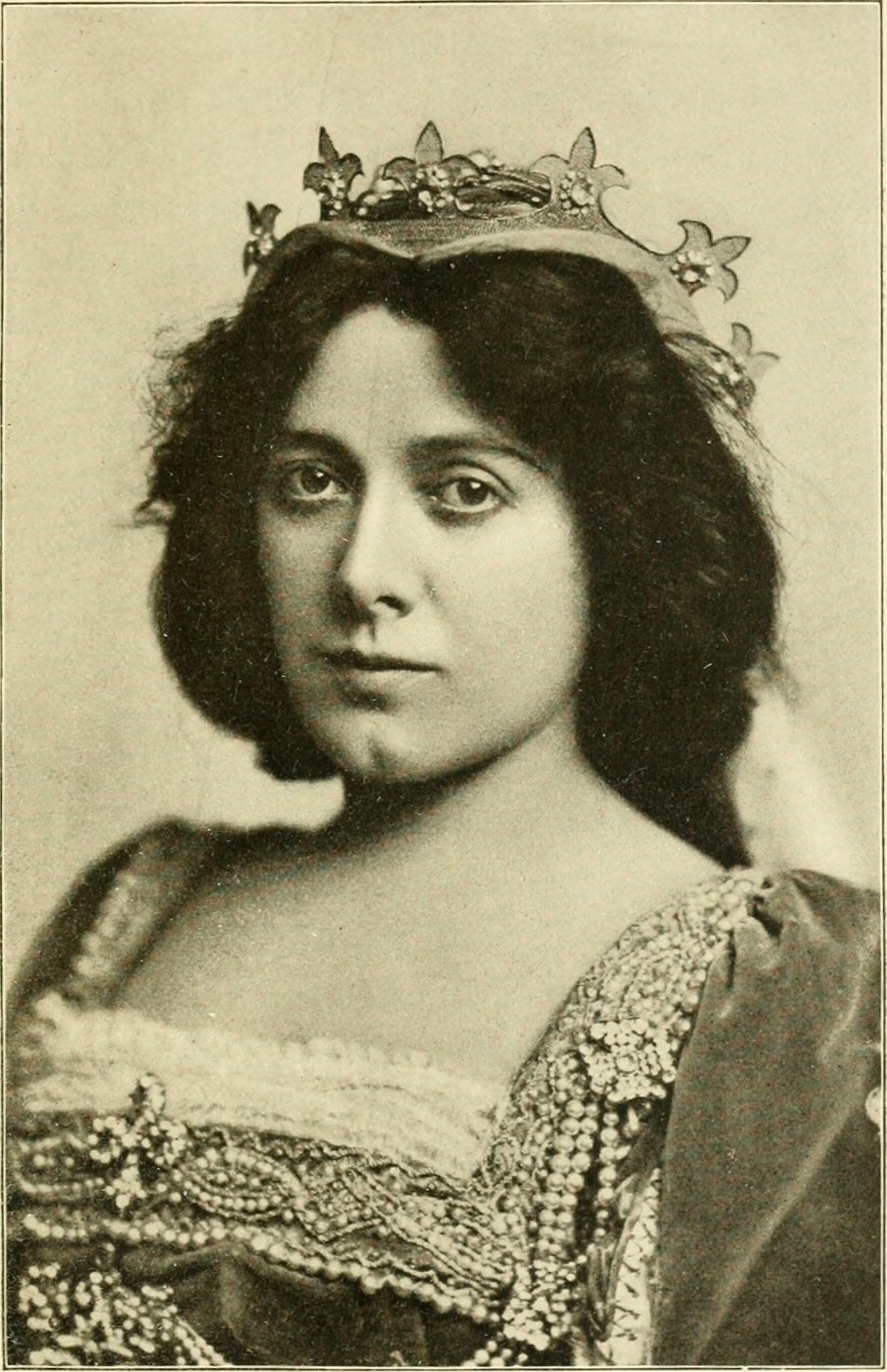
Julia Marlowe as Mary Tudor in When Knighthood Was in Flower

In early 1891, Marlowe came down with a severe case of typhoid fever while on tour in Philadelphia. The owner of the Philadelphia Times newspaper and his wife took Julia in and oversaw her return to health. At one point her face became so swollen that doctors considered lancing her face to release the toxins, but the good judgment of one doctor prevailed and a different treatment was arrived at which would fight the toxins and save her face for her acting career. Had this measure not been taken, she would never have been performing on Broadway by 1895 and would never have established herself as the leading American actress of Shakespeare in her day alongside actor E. H. Sothern.

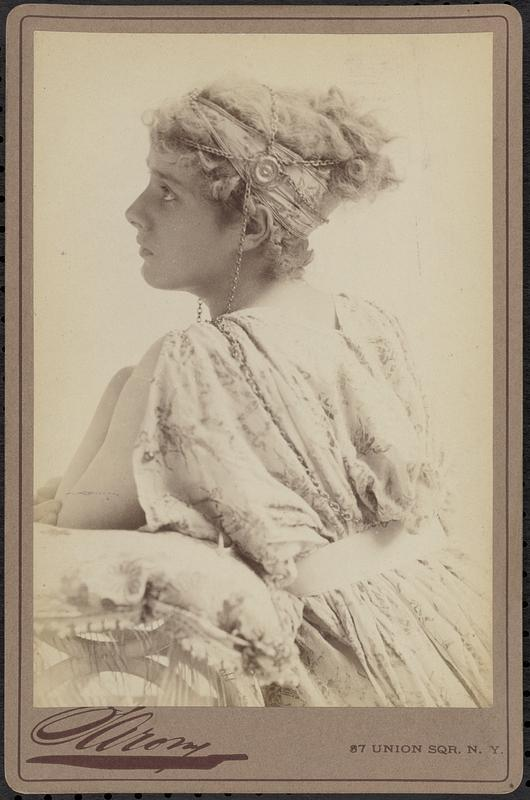
Julia Marlowe, [ca. 1877-1895]. Cabinet Card Collection, Boston Public Library

She made her Broadway debut in 1895 and went on to appear in more than seventy Broadway productions. With the money from her first Broadway success, she bought the townhouse known as River Mansion at 337 Riverside Drive.

By 1897 she was famous enough to be featured in the Sears catalog endorsing a stylish ladies boot made by Rich's Shoes. Her first husband was Broadway actor Robert Taber. Their marriage lasted from 1894 to 1900 and produced no children. According to many who knew her, Marlowe sacrificed her own self-interests many times in order to promote Taber's career. Despite this, however, professional jealousy ended their marriage in 1900. In a letter dated April 2nd, 1895 from Taber he writes "I herewith return your play. Mrs. Taber is grateful for your kindness in submitting it and notwithstanding its interest - She finds it unsuited for her present use. Very truly yours, Robert Taber". Taber was touring in England at the time of their divorce. In 1901, and in a subsequent 1904 revival, Marlowe starred as Mary Tudor in Paul Kester's adaptation of When Knighthood Was in Flower. This was an enormous success, and made Marlowe financially independent. Other hits for Marlowe followed, including Charlotte Oliver in the adaptation by Kester and Middleton of George Washington Cable's The Cavalier, and Ingomar, both in 1903. Of her performance in the latter, The New York Sun wrote, "There is not a woman player in America or in England that is – attractively considered – fit to unlace her shoe".

=== Sothern and later years ===
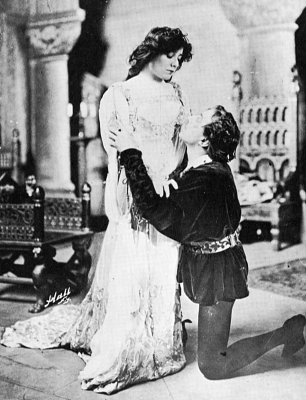
Sothern and Marlowe as Romeo and Juliet 1904

In 1904, she began an extremely successful partnership with actor E. H. Sothern, beginning with their appearances in the title roles in Romeo and Juliet, Beatrice and Benedick in Much Ado About Nothing, and the leads in Hamlet. They toured all over the U.S. in these plays, adding The Taming of the Shrew, The Merchant of Venice and Twelfth Night to their repertoire in 1905. Unhappy with their compensation from their manager, Charles Frohman, they continued under the management of the Shubert Brothers, from then on receiving a percentage of the profits. In 1906, together with Sothern, she played the title character in Percy MacKaye's Jeanne d'Arc, Salome in Sudermann's John the Baptist and Rautendelein in The Sunken Bell, receiving favorable reviews.

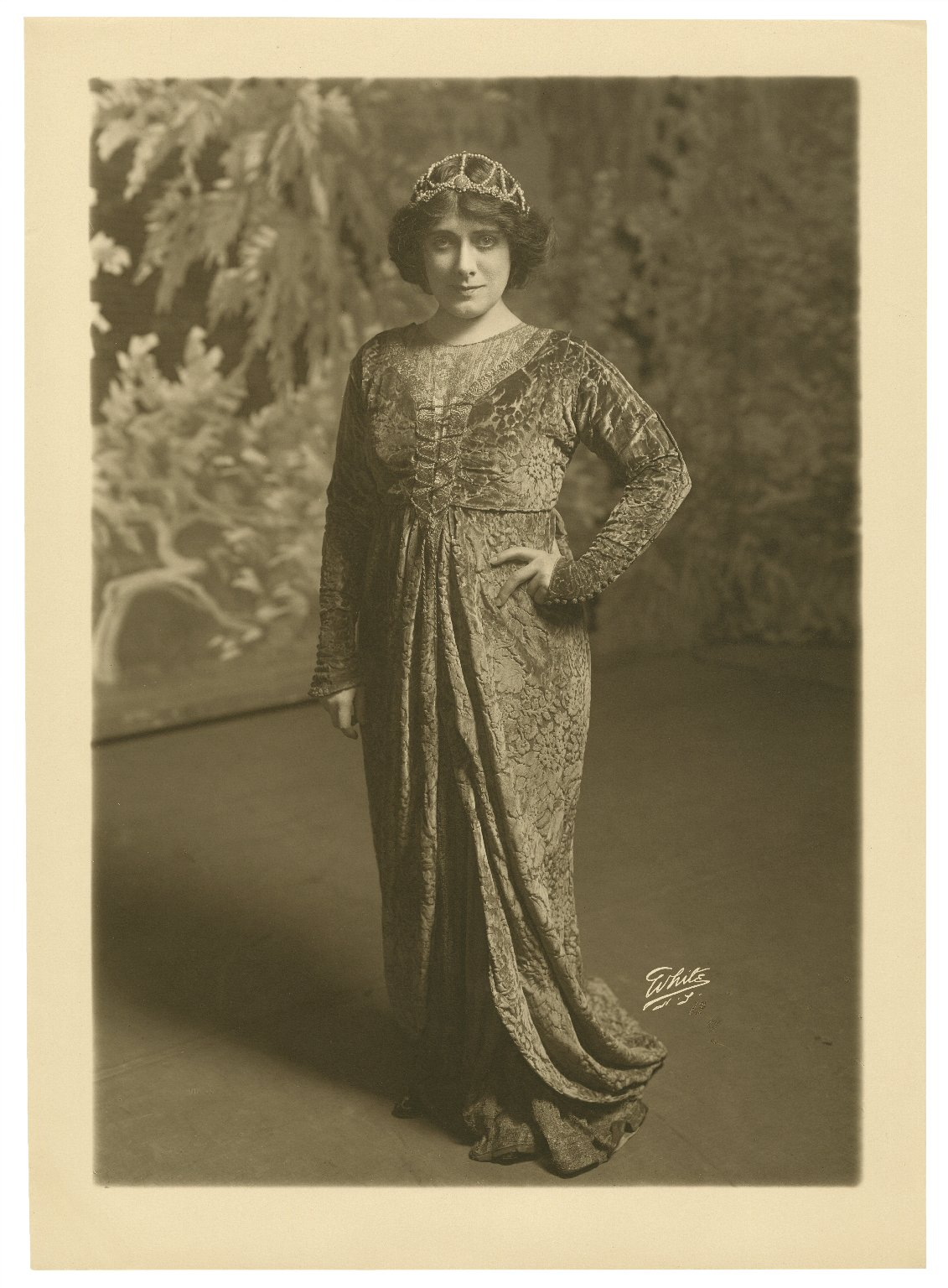
Marlowe as Portia in an early 20th century performance of The Merchant of Venice

After another season in New York and then on tour, Sothern, Marlowe and their company crossed the Atlantic to play in London. They were unable to attract audiences in England, however, and returned to America after a season. Back in the U.S., they presented Shakespeare at affordable prices at the Academy of Music in New York, allowing audiences who had not previously been able to afford their productions to see them. Marlowe and Sothern dissolved their company and formed separate companies for a time. She played in J. B. Fagan's Gloria, in Romeo and Juliet and in As You Like It. In 1908, she played Yvette in Mary Johnston's verse play The Goddess of Reason.

At the end of 1909, Sothern and Marlowe reunited in Antony and Cleopatra. In 1910, they toured in Macbeth, receiving enthusiastic notices and bringing the production to New York where it was a hit.

They continued to tour their Shakespearean repertoire, playing special performances of the plays for schoolchildren. Marlowe and Sothern married in 1911. The couple made eleven phonograph recordings for the Victor company in 1920–1921. These recordings are presumably the only recorded evidence of Marlowe's voice today. After more touring with Sothern in Shakespeare, the two brought their production of The Merchant of Venice to New York in 1921. Soon afterwards, Marlowe's health was failing, and she retired in 1924. After Sothern's death in 1933, Marlowe became somewhat of a recluse. She occasionally visited close friends like ailing playwright Edward Sheldon. In 1923, she received an honorary doctorate from George Washington University, and another in 1943 from Columbia University.

== Feminism ==
Marlowe was highly engaged as a feminist. She fought for women's right to vote.

== Death ==
Marlowe died on November 12, 1950, in New York City, aged 85. She had no children.

== Bibliography ==
- Barry, John D. Julia Marlowe. Boston: R. G. Badger, 1899.
- Russell, Charles Edward. Julia Marlowe, Her Life and Art. New York: D. Appleton and company, 1926.
- Marlowe, Julia, and E. H. Sothern. Julia Marlowe's Story. New York: Rinehart, 1954.
