= Charles Major (writer) =

American lawyer and novelist

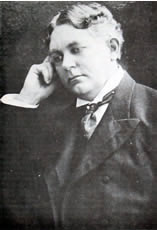
- Born: July 25, 1856; Indianapolis, Indiana, U.S.A,
- Died: February 13, 1913 (aged 56); Shelbyville, Indiana, U.S.A,
- Education: old Shelbyville High School, University of Michigan at Ann Arbor
- Occupations: Lawyer and novelist
- Writing career
- Pen name: Edwin Caskoden
- Notable works: When Knighthood Was in Flower, The Bears of Blue River, Dorothy Vernon of Haddon Hall

Charles Major (July 25, 1856 – February 13, 1913) was an American lawyer and novelist.

== Biography ==
Major was born on July 25, 1856, in Indianapolis. Born to an upper-middle class Indianapolis family, Majors graduated from the old Shelbyville High School which then like most other colleges, universities and even down to the growing early secondary schools / high schools in that 19th century era emphasized Classical and European history and ancient languages as part of the academic curriculum. In 1872 Major attended the adjacent state University of Michigan at Ann Arbor for three years, and after an apprenticeship in the law practice of his father, and successfully completing the required examinations here, was admitted to the Indiana Bar and its bar association in 1877. Shortly thereafter he opened his own law practice, which also launched a short political career, culminating in a year-long term in the Indiana General Assembly (state legislature) at the Indiana Statehouse (state capitol) in Indianapolis.

Writing fiction remained an interest of Major, and fifteen years later at age 42, he published his first novel in 1896, When Knighthood Was in Flower under the pseudonym / pen name of Edwin Caskoden. The novel about old medieval Kingdom of England in the 16th century during the reign of King Henry VIII (1491–1547, reigned 1509–1547). It was an exhaustively extensively researched saga of historical fiction and romantic fiction, and soon became enormously popular, holding a place on several bestselling published book lists for nearly three years in the late 1890s. The novel was adapted into a popular Broadway play in New York City by popular noted playwright Paul Kester (1870–1933) for the turn-of-the-century stage in the 1901 season, premiering at the Criterion Theatre that year. The novel also launched relatively several subsequent successful film adaptations in the silent film format (up to 1927–1928), first in the earlier Nickelodeon era of shorter flicks in 1908 and again a second time with longer more developed plot by the 1922 version.

With a successful writing career thus launched, Major gradually lessened his other legal obligations, finally closing his law practice in 1899 after only a year after his first novel publication. With the later publication of his third novel in 1902, Dorothy Vernon of Haddon Hall, which was another historical romance, this time continuing in the royal history and biography of England, set in the later Elizabethan era and continuing the story of the later Tudor dynasty of the times of Henry VIII's younger daughter Queen Elizabeth I (the Great) (1533–1603, reigned 1558–1603), in the late 16th to early 17th centuries. It too rivaled the success of his first book. Once again, the Dorothy Vernon of Haddon Hall novel was adapted for the live theater again by Paul Kester, and saw another silent film release under the same title as the 1902 book in 1924 starring the most famous film star of that time and "sweetheart of America", Mary Pickford (1892–1979) at age 22.

A third film adaptation of Major's first novel When Knighthood Was in Flower, this time with more modern technology of added sound over a half-century later made in 1953 by The Walt Disney Company studios, under the changed title of The Sword and the Rose

Major continued to write and publish several additional novels, to varying degrees of success, as well as a number of children's adventure stories, most set in and around his native state of Indiana.

He died at the age of 57 of Hepatocellular carcinoma (liver cancer) on February 13, 1913, at his home in Shelbyville, Indiana.

Almost a century later, in 2006, Shelbyville, Indiana native Eric Linne wrote and copyrighted a motion picture screenplay adaptation of Major's earlier novel The Bears of Blue River.

== Bibliography ==
- When Knighthood Was in Flower (1898)
- The Bears of Blue River (1901)
- Dorothy Vernon of Haddon Hall (1902)
- A Forest Hearth: A Romance of Indiana in the Thirties (1903)
- Yolanda: A Maid of Burgundy (1905)
- Uncle Tom Andy Bill: A Story of Bears and Indian Treasure (1908)
- A Gentle Knight of Old Brandenburg (1909) (about Princess Wilhelmine of Prussia and Margravine, consort of Frederick, Margrave of Brandenburg-Bayreuth)
- The Little King: A Story of the Childhood of King Louis XIV (1910)
- Sweet Alyssum (1911)
- The Touchstone of Fortune: Being the Memoir of Baron Clyde etc. (1912)
- Rosalie (1925)

== Filmography ==
- Sweet Alyssum, directed by Colin Campbell (1915, based on the story Sweet Alyssum: A Story of the Indiana Oil Fields)
- When Knighthood Was in Flower, directed by Robert G. Vignola (1922, based on the novel When Knighthood Was in Flower)
- Dorothy Vernon of Haddon Hall, directed by Marshall Neilan (1924, based on the novel Dorothy Vernon of Haddon Hall)
- Yolanda, directed by Robert G. Vignola (1924, based on the novel Yolanda)
- The Sword and the Rose, directed by Ken Annakin (1953, based on the novel When Knighthood Was in Flower)
