= When Knighthood Was in Flower (novel) =

Book by Charles Major

When Knighthood Was in Flower is the debut novel of American author Charles Major (1856-1913) of Shelbyville, Indiana, written under the pseudonym / pen name of "Edwin Caskoden". It was first published by The Bobbs-Merrill Company (then named the Bowen-Merrill Company) of New York City in 1898 and proved an enormous success, and on numerous best seller lists for three years.

According to The New York Times, in its third year on the bookstore market the book was still selling so well that it was #9 on the list of bestselling novels in the United States for 1900.

The book spawned an entire subsequent industry of increased interest in historical fiction / romantic fiction, romance novels and subsequent films to eventually television series and even modern soap operas / drama.

Noted playwright Paul Kester's (1870-1933) play adaptation premiered on Broadway at the turn-of-the-century at the Criterion Theatre (later Olympia Theatre) in New York City on January 14, 1901. Starring the actress Julia Marlowe as Mary Tudor, it was a popular and financial success both in New York and subsequently on national tour throughout the country. Roselle Knott successfully succeeded Julia Marlowe in the part of Mary I of England (Mary Tudor - "Bloody Queen Mary"), the still clinging to the old Roman Catholic faith) eldest daughter of old King Henry VIII. It is Roselle Knott whose photo portrait appears as the frontispiece in the book shown on this page. There is also another photograph of Knott further into the book. It was subsequently revived on Broadway again in 1904. By 1907 When Knighthood Was in Flower was still being printed by the reprint publisher, Grosset & Dunlap, when the film rights were sold to the Biograph Studios.

It was sometimes known by the title When Knights Were Bold and should not be confused with the 1906 play When Knights Were Bold which also inspired several film adaptations.

== Plot summary ==
Set during the Tudor dynasty period in the late 15th and 16th centuries of English history, When Knighthood Was in Flower tells the tribulations of Mary Tudor, a younger sister of old King Henry VIII of England who has fallen in love with a commoner. However, for political reasons, King Henry has arranged for her to wed neighboring King Louis XII of France and demands his sister put the House of Tudor first, threatening, "You will marry France and I will give you a wedding present – Charles Brandon's head!"

== Film Adaptations ==
=== 1908 adaptation ===
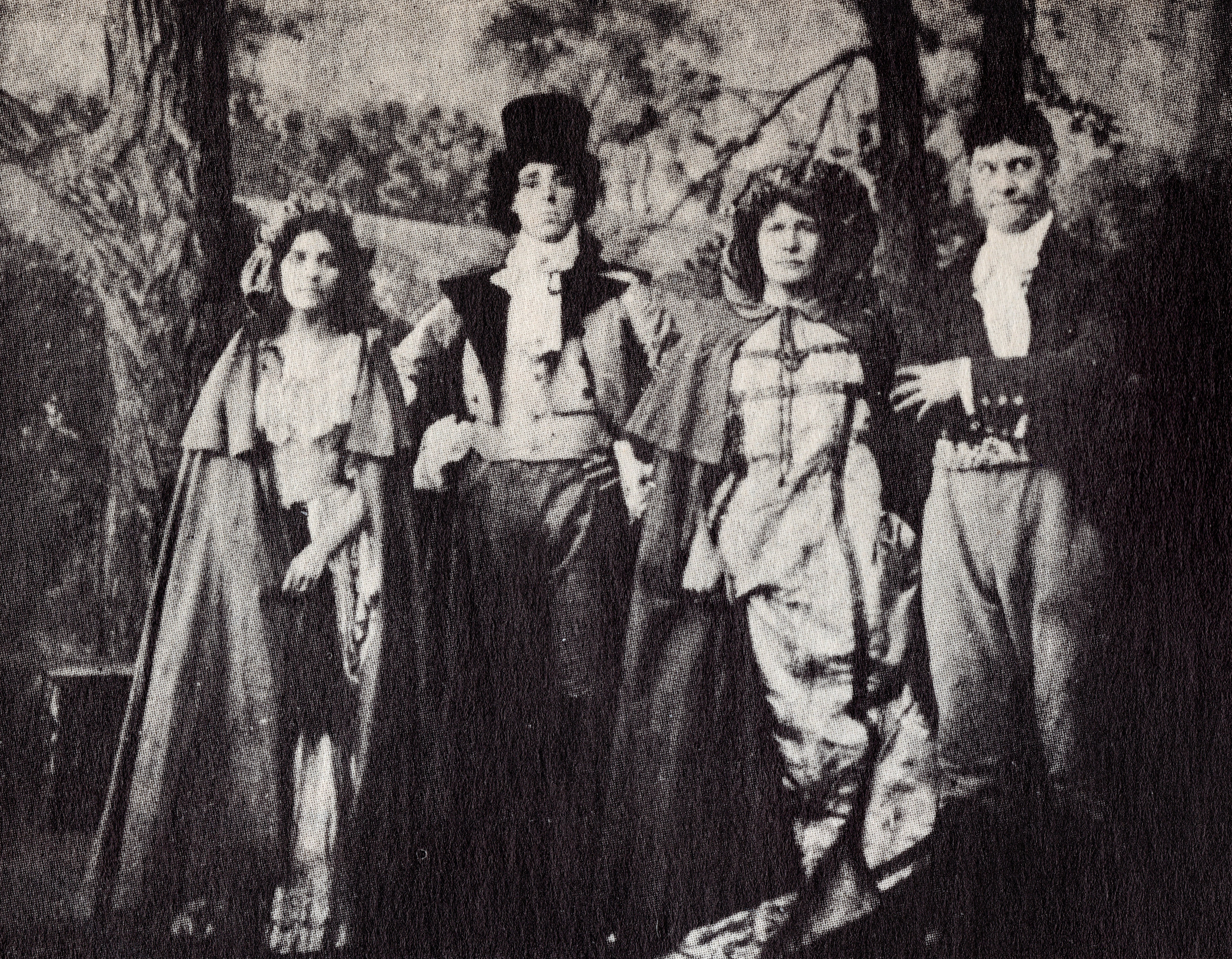
Cast of When Knights Were Bold (1908), from left: Linda Arvidson, director D. W. Griffith, unknown player, and Harry Solter.

Although no copy of the film exists, the book is believed to have been optioned to the old Biograph Studios, adapted to a 1908 silent film / motion picture of the same name or under the title When Knights Were Bold by D. W. Griffith (1875-1948), and directed by Wallace McCutcheon (c. 1858/1862-1918)

=== 1922 adaptation ===
The 1922 version is most remembered as the vehicle for Marion Davies financed by her paramour of national newspaper syndicate titan / mogul William Randolph Hearst (1863-1951) and his company Cosmopolitan Productions. Directed by Robert Vignola (1882-1953), and starring Hearst's mistress Marion Davies (1897-1961) and Forrest Stanley (1889-1969), it was a big-budget silent film.

=== 1953 adaptation ===
In 1953, Major's book was remade by Walt Disney (1901-1966) with the title The Sword and the Rose in the United States, but released with the original title in the United Kingdom. This version was adapted for the screen by American Lawrence Edward Watkin (1901-1981), but was filmed in the United Kingdom. Directed by Ken Annakin (1914-2009), with a British and French cast, it starred Richard Todd (1919-2009), and Glynis Johns (1923-2024), In 1955, the film was broadcast on the American Broadcasting Company (ABC-TV) network on the longtime Disneyland weekly Sunday evening television show in two parts under the original 1898 book title chosen by author Charles Major when published of When Knighthood Was in Flower.

== See also ==
- Cultural depictions of Henry VIII
