= Covies =

Irish short film series

- Genre: Drama, Comedy
- Created by: Len Collin
- Written by: Len Collin
- Directed by: Len Collin
- Starring: Sarah Carroll; Paul O’Brien; Donal O’Meachair; Christopher Dunne; Aoife Carr; Natalia Kostrzewa; Paul Dunning; Georgia Collin; Maya Petrovic; Tom Murphy; Linda Teehan; Klara McDonnell; Aoibheann McCaul; Orla McGovern; Paddy Guthrie; Anu Vidyarthi; Annette Flynn; Fiona Jennings; Penny McGovern; David Curtis
- Composer: Joseph Conlan
- Country of origin: Ireland
- Original language: English
- No. of seasons: 1
- No. of episodes: 9

Production
- Producers: Danny McLaughlin; Eugene Lavelle
- Cinematography: Brian Durcan; David Sneddon
- Camera setup: HDV
- Running time: average 15 minutes

Original release
- Release: 11 January 2010

Covies is an Irish series of web-based drama short films created by Len Collin and is an online soap set in Westport, Ireland.

== Overview ==
Covies was created, written and directed by Len Collin and is the world's first online multi-stranded drama. The term covie refers to the slang name for natives of Westport.

=== Plot ===
The storyline for Covies begins with a naked man on a beach. He has no memory, doesn't speak and finds his way eventually to the O’Malleys’ cottage. Bridie O’Malley is in her early 30s, her husband, Vinnie, is a gambling, drinking, womaniser not afraid to use violence. Bridie's willingness to help clothe and feed the stranger is at odds with her desire to keep the peace with her husband. She calls on Fr Leonard her parish priest for help, but Vinnie returns unexpectedly.

Father Leonard reluctantly puts the stranger up for the night in a barn but the next morning he has disappeared. Ultimately, the stranger is found at the foot of Croagh Patrick, where he causes a stir as he announces that his name is Patrick. A deaf old man hears this and attributes a miracle to the stranger now named Patrick.

In the following episodes, Fr Leonard and Bridie try to help Patrick regain his memory, but there are those in the community who believe that he is some kind of saint. This does not go down well with Fr Leonard's superiors. At the same time Garda Burke is on the trail of the true identity of the man they call Patrick.

Episode three also reveals the gritty and vitriolic story of Bridie and Vinnie's marriage and is only suitable for those viewers aged 18 and over.

There is also the Blaneys who provide much of the comedy, as well as the mad machinations of the Three Bitches – think Macbeth. Overall mystery and subterfuge peppered with strange visions and anarchic and eccentric humour ensure ‘Covies’ will be compelling viewing, helping to put Mayo on the map as the perfect location for the film industry.

== Cast ==
- Sarah Carroll
- Paul O’Brien
- Donal O’Meachair
- Christopher Dunne
- Aoife Carr
- Natalia Kostrzewa
- Paul Dunning
- Georgia Collin
- Maya Petrovic
- Tom Murphy
- Linda Teehan
- Klara McDonnell
- Aoibheann McCaul
- Órla Mc Govern
- Paddy Guthrie
- Anu Vidyarthi
- Annette Flynn
- Fiona Jennings
- Penny McGovern
- David Curtis

== Crew ==
- Brian Durcan
- Dave Sneddon
- Robert Coakley
- Dan McManamon
- Ian Boyle
- Therese Kelly
- Patrick Murphy

== Episodes ==
No.	Title	Original release date
1	"The Nudie Man"	January 25, 2010
2	"Seeing Things"	February 1, 2010
3	"A Kind of Loving"	February 8, 2010
4	"Fiona Flagherty's Arse"	February 15, 2010
5	"After Drowning People"	February 22, 2010
6	"Swimming With Sharks"	March 1, 2010
7	"Poison"	March 8, 2010
8	"Wanted"	March 22, 2010
