= When Knighthood Was in Flower (play) =

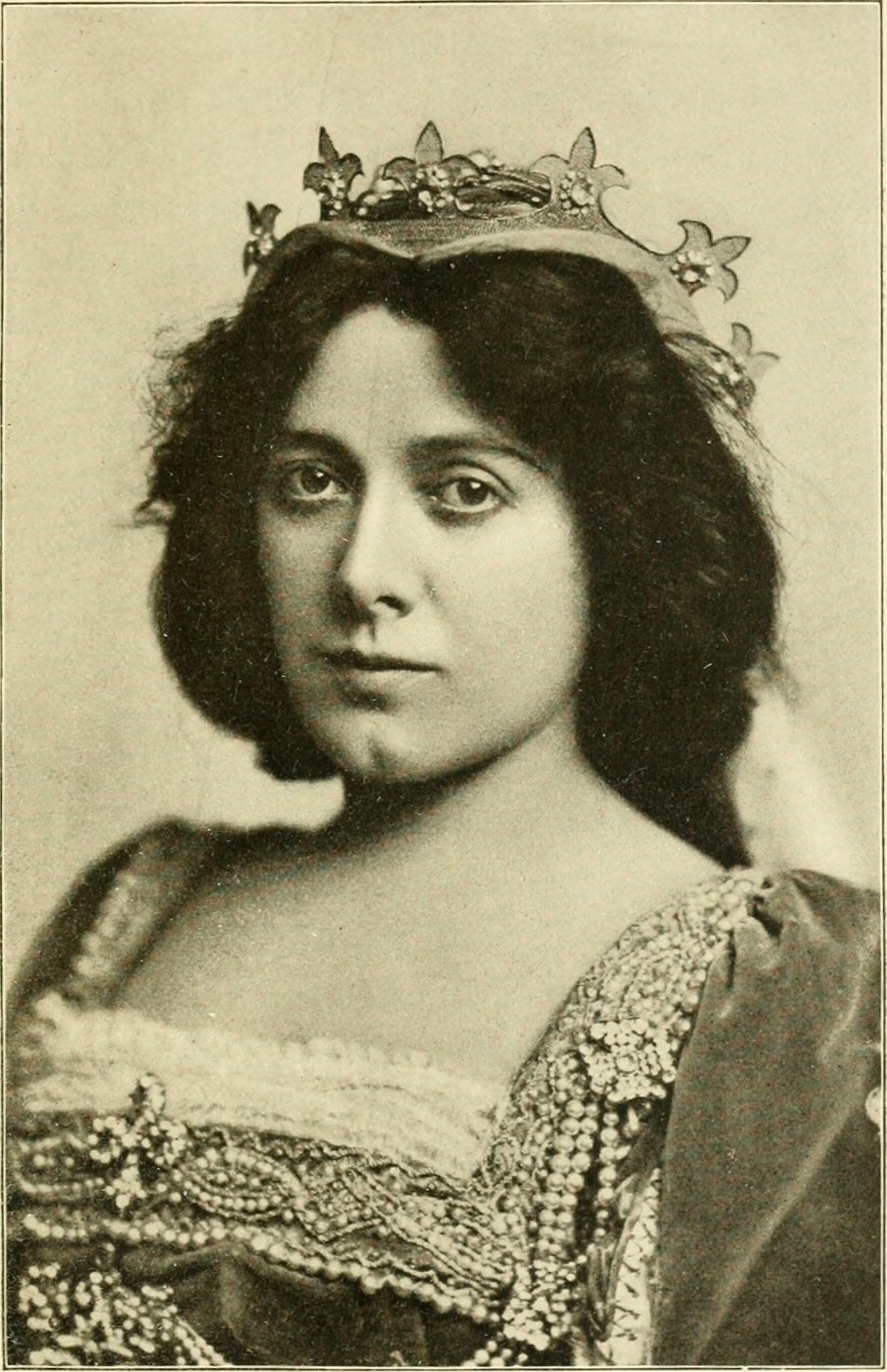
Julia Marlowe as Mary Tudor in When Knighthood Was in Flower

When Knighthood Was in Flower is a play in four acts by Paul Kester. It is based on the 1898 novel of the same name by Charles Major. The work premiered on Broadway at the Criterion Theatre on January 14, 1901. It ran for a total of 176 performances; closing in June 1901. The original production was produced by Charles Frohman and used sets by Ernest Albert, Frank E. Gates and Edward A. Morange. The costumes were designed by Mrs. Charles Hone and Harper Pennington. The cast was led by Bruce McRae as Charles Brandon and Julia Marlowe as Mary Tudor among others.

Theatre historian Ken Bloom, wrote that When Knighthood Was in Flower was "one of the most famous plays of the decade" and cited Marlowe's performance as a major critical triumph in that actress's career. Marlowe, however, was initially criticized for taking on a non-Shakespearean role as critics thought the work inferior to her usual repertoire. The play, however, was a huge popular and financial success for Marlowe and the show's producers both in New York and on national tour, and was subsequently revived on Broadway at the Empire Theatre in 1904.

The play was parodied in the musical The King's Carnival.

== Bibliography ==
- Ken Bloom (2013). Routledge Guide to Broadway. Taylor & Francis. ISBN 9781135871178.
- Mantle, Burns; Sherwood, Garrison P.; Chapman, John Arthur (1944). "When Knighthood Was in Flower". The Best Plays of 1899-1909. Dodd, Mead & Co.
- Dietz, Dan (2019). "The King's Carnival". The Complete Book of 1920s Broadway Musicals. Rowman & Littlefield Publishers. ISBN 9781442245280.
- Fisher, James; Hardison Londré, Felicia (2009). "When Knighthood Was in Flower". The A to Z of American Theater: Modernism. Scarecrow Press. ISBN 9780810870475.
