= Paul Kester =

U.S. playwright

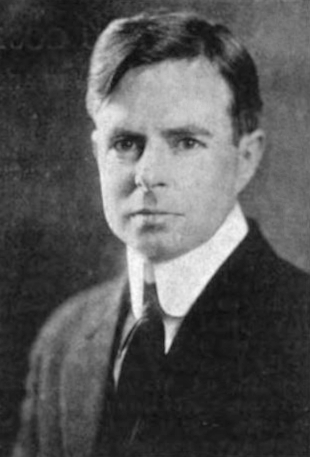
- Paul Kester in 1917
- Born: November 2, 1870; Delaware, Ohio, US
- Died: June 21, 1933 (aged 62); Lake Mohegan, New York, US
- Occupations: Playwright, novelist
- Relatives: Vaughan Kester (brother); William Dean Howells (cousin)

Paul Kester (November 2, 1870 – June 21, 1933) was an American playwright and novelist. He was the younger brother of journalist Vaughan Kester and a cousin of the literary editor and critic William Dean Howells.

== Life and career ==
Kester was born in 1870 at Delaware, Ohio. He was the younger of two sons raised by Franklin "Frank" Cooley and Harriet (née Watkins) Kester. His father was a traveling salesman, and his mother was an art teacher who in 1882 helped and found the Cleveland School of Art. Kester was educated by home tutors and at private schools where he excelled in the dramatic arts.

His first success came in January 1892 with Countess Roudine, which premiered in Philadelphia at the Chestnut Street Theatre and opened a week later at the Union Square Theatre in New York City. Countess Roudine was a collaborative effort written with the actress Minnie Maddern Fiske.

In 1896 his adaptation of Edward Bulwer-Lytton's Eugene Aram was produced by Walker Whiteside's company and in 1902 with George Middleton adapted the George W. Cable Southern romance The Cavalier that was staged at the Criterion Theatre with Julia Marlowe. Actress Annie Russell produced and starred in his 1906 Quaker tale Friend Hannah, written with the help of his brother, Vaughan.

Kester worked on nearly 30 plays over his career. His most successful Broadway effort was probably The Woman of Bronze, which ran for 252 performances between September 1920 and April 1921 at Manhattan's Frazee Theatre. He also authored a number of books, with His Own Country (1917) most likely the more popular.

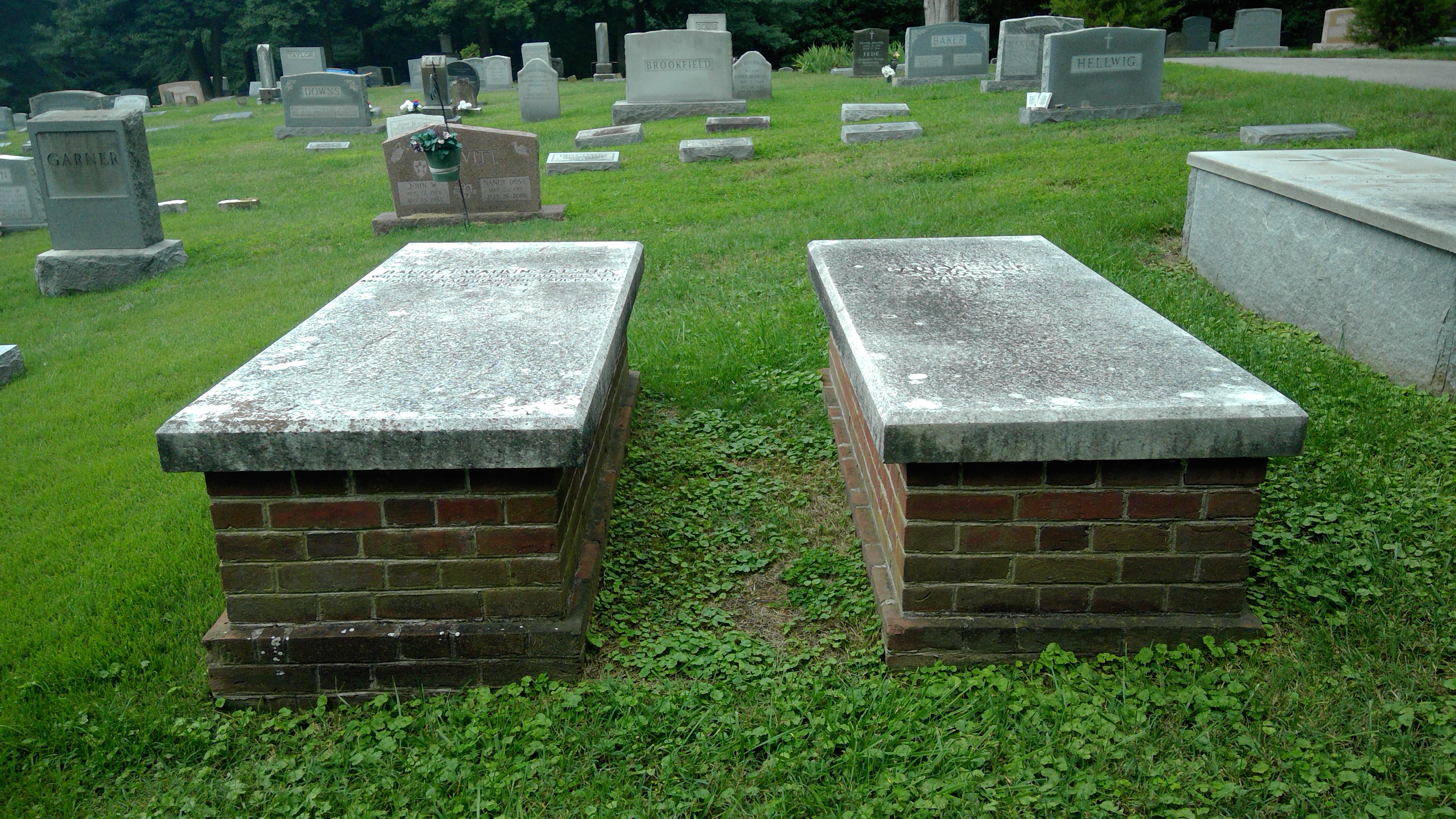
Graves of Paul Kester and his mother at Pohick Church in Fairfax County, Virginia. The writer's grave is on the right; his mother's is on the left.

Described as shy and diffident, Kester preferred country life to that of the city. In 1902, with his brother, he purchased and renovated Woodlawn Plantation in Northern Virginia. Five years later the two acquired nearby Gunston Hall, where Vaughan Kester died in 1911. A few years later Kester and his mother relocated to Belmont, an estate near Alexandria, Virginia, which is today part of the campus of St. Stephen's & St. Agnes School. Kester spent his final years at Lake Mohegan, a small community near Peekskill, New York. He died there in 1933 at the age of 62, a victim of thrombosis. At the time the closest surviving member of his family was the mezzo-soprano opera singer Florence Wickham, a cousin. He is buried in the graveyard at Pohick Church, once the parish church of Gunston Hall; at one time he had served as a member of the church vestry.

== Selected works ==
=== Theatre ===
Kester's Broadway credits are recorded at the Internet Broadway Database.

- Countess Roudine (written with Minnie Maddern Fiske) – January 13, 1892 – Union Square Theatre – Helena Modjeska
- Eugene Aram (from the book by Edward Bulwer-Lytton) –1896 tour – Walker Whiteside
- Sweet Nell of Old Drury – August 30, 1900 – Haymarket Theatre – Julia Neilson – January 1, 1901 Knickerbocker Theatre – Ada Rehan
- When Knighthood Was in Flower (from the 1898 book by Charles Major) – January 14, 1901 – Criterion Theatre (Broadway) – Julia Marlowe
- The Cavalier (from the book by George W. Cable) – December 8, 1902 – Criterion Theatre (Broadway) – Julia Marlowe
- Dorothy Vernon of Haddon Hall (from the 1902 book by Charles Major) December 14, 1903 – New York Theatre – Bertha Galland
- Don Quixote (from the book by Miguel de Cervantes) – January 27, 1908 – Lyric Theatre – E. H. Sothern
- Beverly's Balance – Apr 12, 1915 – Lyric Theatre – Margaret Anglin
- The Woman of Bronze (adapted from the play by Henry Kistemaeckers) – September 7, 1920 – Frazee Theatre (Broadway) – Margaret Anglin
- Lady Dedlock (from Bleak House by Charles Dickens) – December 31, 1928 – Ambassador Theatre – Margaret Anglin
- Tom Sawyer (from the book by Mark Twain) – December 25, 1931 – Alvin Theatre, Clifford Adams (Finn) and Preston Dawson Jr. (Sawyer)

=== Novels ===
More information is available in the Paul Kester Papers at the New York Public Library.

- Tales of the Real Gypsy (1897)
- His Own Country (1917)
- Conservative Democracy (1919)
- Diana Dauntless (1929)
- The Course of True Love (1930)

==== His Own Country ====
Kester spoke of his novel His Own Country in the aftermath of World War I:

The Race problem is always with us, and as my story deals in a serious way with its more serious aspects, I do not think it can be untimely. New phases of this great problem come up from day to day – but the problem itself is as old as history – very likely it will remain a problem to the end of history. Racial differences and the prejudices resulting from them have always confronted practical statesmen. The old method of dealing with them was by conquest, subjugation, or extermination. Such methods are now obsolete. Better ones must be found. Understanding must precede intelligent action along any lines, and my reason – perhaps I would better say my justification – for writing His Own Country has been my hope and belief that it would bring some little considered phases of this menacing and mighty problem more clearly before the minds of readers who live remote from it, yet whose consent is necessary, as it should be in a democracy, to any adjustment of settlement of living conditions where the races are existing side by side.

=== "Home" ===
I want to go home
To the dull old town
With the shaded streets
And the open square
And the hill
And the flats
And the house I love
And the paths I know -
I want to go home.
If I can't go back
To the happy days,
Yet I can live
Where their shadows lie,
Under the trees
And over the grass -
I want to be there
Where the joy was once.
Oh, I want to go home,
I want to go home.
