= When Knighthood Was in Flower (1922 film) =

1922 film

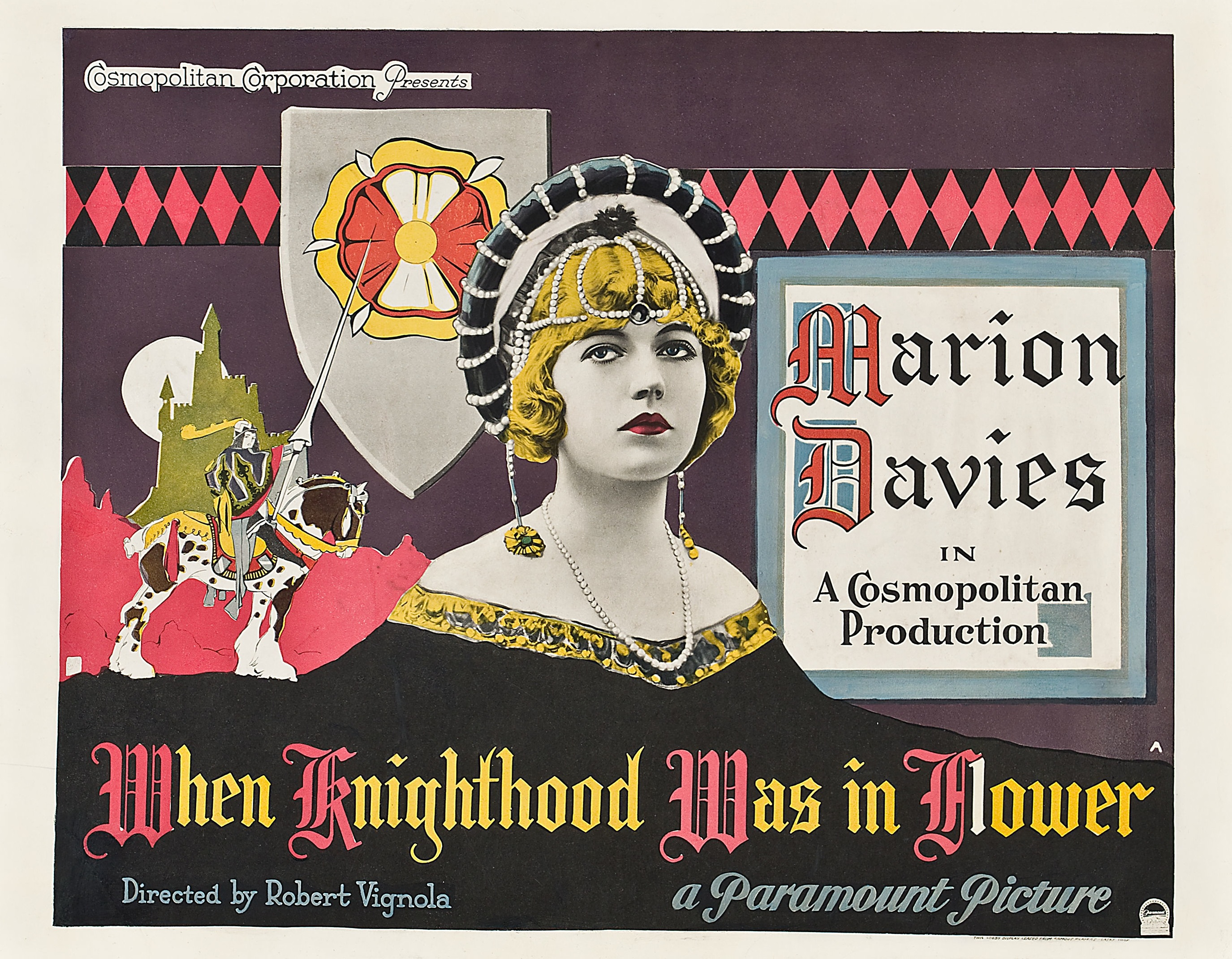
- Theatrical poster
- Directed by: Robert G. Vignola
- Based on: When Knighthood Was in Flower; 1898 novel by Charles Major; James B. Fagan (play)
- Produced by: William Randolph Hearst
- Starring: Marion Davies
- Cinematography: Ira H. Morgan; Harold Wenstrom
- Music by: William Frederick Peters; Victor Herbert (additional music)
- Production company: Cosmopolitan Productions
- Distributed by: Paramount Pictures
- Release date: September 21, 1922
- Running time: 12 reels; 11,618 feet (120 minutes)
- Country: United States
- Language: Silent (English intertitles)
- Budget: $1.5 million
- Box office: $1.5 million

When Knighthood Was in Flower is a 1922 American silent historical film directed by Robert G. Vignola, based on the novel by Charles Major and play by Paul Kester. The film was produced by William Randolph Hearst (through his Cosmopolitan Productions) for Marion Davies and distributed by Paramount Pictures. This was William Powell's second film. The story was re-filmed by Walt Disney in 1953 as The Sword and the Rose, directed by Ken Annakin.

The full movie

== Plot ==
To secure a peace treaty, Henry VIII arranges for his sister, Mary Tudor, to marry Louis XII. However, her heart belongs to Charles Brandon. The lovers attempt a daring escape, only to be captured. When Brandon is falsely framed for murder, Mary makes a heartbreaking choice: she agrees to wed Louis to spare Brandon's life. Following Brandon's exile, the frail and ailing French king dies shortly after the nuptials. Thwarting the matrimonial advances of Louis's nephew, Francis I, Mary reclaims her destiny and is ultimately reunited in marriage with Brandon.

== Cast ==
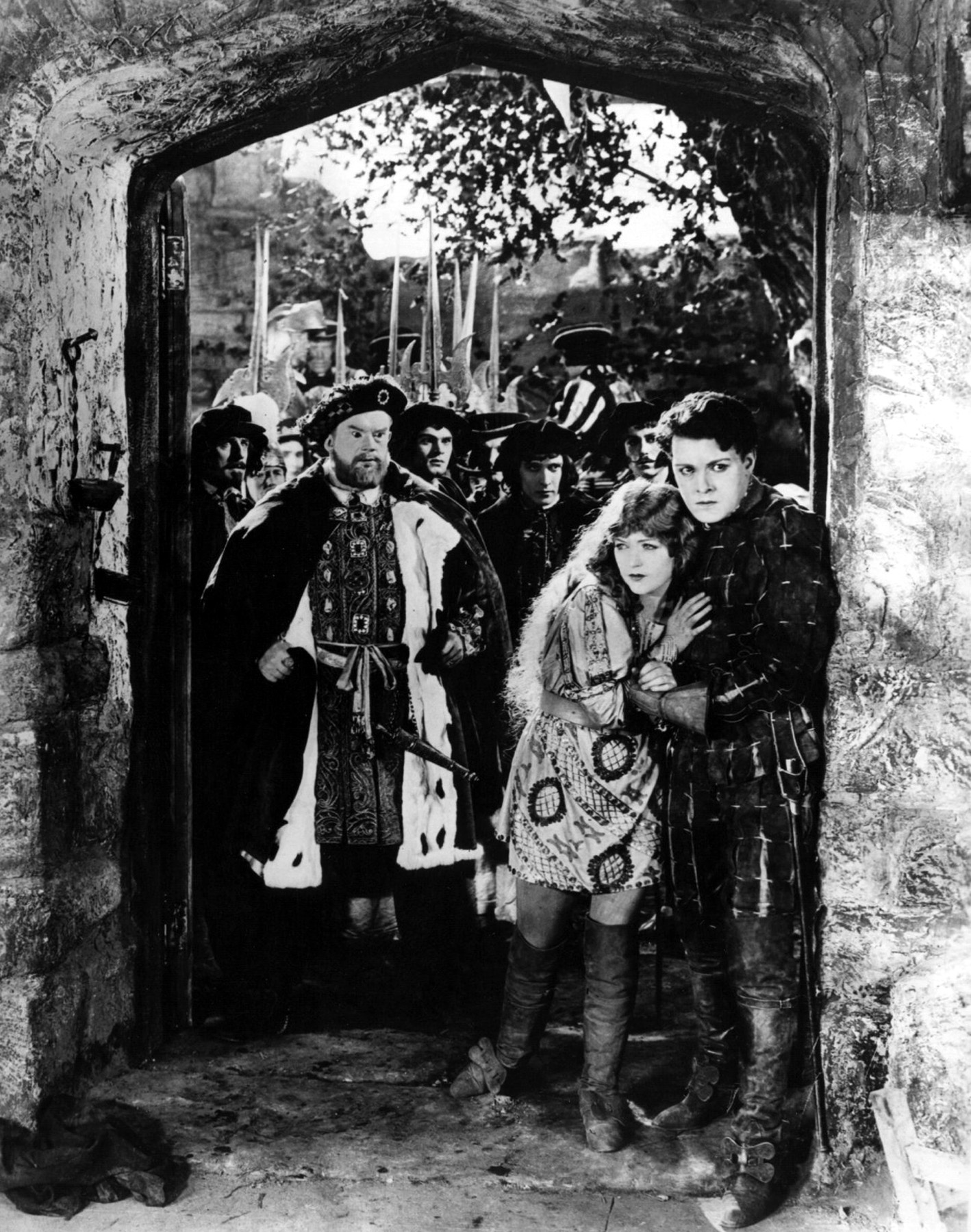
Left to right: Lyn Harding, Marion Davies, Forrest Stanley

- Marion Davies as Mary Tudor
- Forrest Stanley as Charles Brandon
- Lyn Harding as Henry VIII
- Teresa Maxwell-Conover as Queen Catherine (credited as Theresa Maxwell Conover)
- Pedro de Cordoba as Duke of Buckingham
- Ruth Shepley as Lady Jane Bolingbroke
- Ernest Glendinning as Sir Edwin Caskoden
- Arthur Forrest as Cardinal Wolsey
- Johnny Dooley as Will Sommers
- William Kent as King's tailor
- Charles K. Gerrard as Sir Adam Judson
- Arthur Donaldson as Sir Henry Brandon
- Downing Clarke as Lord Chamberlain
- William Norris as Louis XII
- Macey Harlam as Duc de Longueville
- William Powell as Francis I (credited as William H. Powell)
- George Nash as An adventurer
- Gustav von Seyffertitz as Grammont
- Paul Panzer as Captain of the Guard
- Flora Finch as French countess
- Guy Coombs as Follower of Buckingham

== Production ==
Exteriors were shot at Windsor Castle, England. With an estimated cost of $1,500,000, it was considered by Life "the most expensive film that has ever been produced" in 1922. According to Variety, William Randolph Hearst launched "the most expensive and extensive campaign that has ever been organized for anything theatrical", with over 650 billboards in New York, 300 subway advertising placards, special booths in department stores that sold souvenir books, and a dazzling string of electric signs that pervaded Times Square, upon which Will Rogers quipped that Davies's next film would be titled When Electric Light Was in Power.

Marion Davies makes her entrance coming down the river on a royal barge. The barge was a full-sized replica built in Bridgeport, Connecticut. The scene and the dance were filmed on the Laddins Rock Farm in Stamford/Old Greenwich, Connecticut. Hearst commissioned two songs from Victor Herbert: "The When Knighthood Was in Flower Waltz" and "The Marion Davies March," which were played at the New York premiere.

== Reception ==
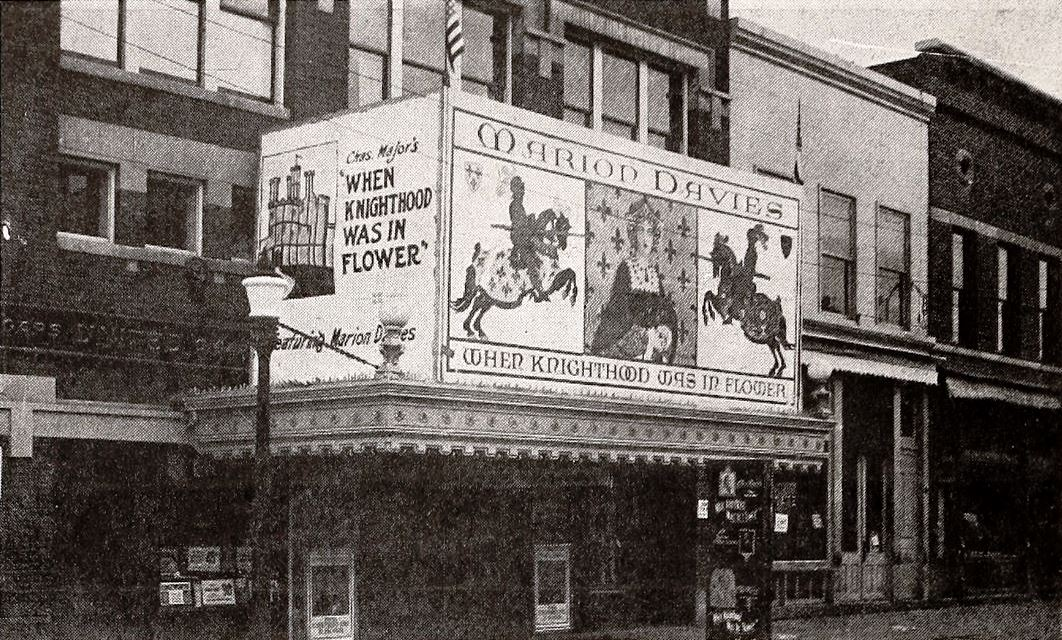
The Alhambra Theater in Shelbyville, Indiana, showing the film.

Robert E. Sherwood defined the film "gorgeously beautiful [...] flashily romantic and stirringly impressive", ranking it as one of the best pictures of the year and appreciated Vignola's "genius for lighting and composition". In 1922, Motion Picture News stated the film was "not only Cosmopolitan's greatest achievement [but] one of the greatest achievements of the silversheet", wrote a positive review of the cast and praised Vignola "for his masterly direction".

Delight Evans cited the film among "the most entertaining photoplays ever made" on Photoplay in 1923. It was ranked #10 on Screenland's reader poll of "The Ten Best Screenplays Ever Made" in 1924. The Motion Picture Guide praised the film for its "tremendous production values, excellent direction, a good script, and an outstanding cast", giving it three out of four stars.

It was a triumph for Marion Davies, and she was named "Queen of the Screen" and the #1 female box office star of 1922 at the annual theater owners ball (Rudolph Valentino was named #1 male star). However, the movie was negatively received in London and, according to Davies, the English did not accept an American woman playing an English character. Despite the controversy, it was appreciated by Edward, Prince of Wales, who defined it "a wonderful picture". British art dealer Joseph Duveen stated the film setting was "the most stupendous reproduction of Henry the Eighth court life that has ever been achieved — a marvelous piece of artistry".

== Legacy ==
The film was spoofed in Broncho Billy Anderson's When Knights Were Cold (1923), starring Stan Laurel and Mae Dahlberg.

Ben Model used portions of the songs commissioned by Hearst for the film's New York premiere in his theatre organ score for the 2017 restoration of the film. The restored film was scanned from an original 35mm nitrate print preserved by the Library of Congress. Its color tints have been reinstated and the film's hand-colored sequence has been digitally replicated. The first time this restored Knighthood was seen just "as it appeared in the 1920s" was at a special screening in May 2023 at New York City's historic Jefferson Market Library.
