= Harold Beaudine =

American film director

Harold Beaudine (November 29, 1894 – May 9, 1949) was an early Hollywood film director of silent films. William Beaudine was his brother. He directed more than 70 films, many of them short films. Beaudine was born in New York City and died in Sawtelle, Los Angeles, California. He is known for his action filled comedies. His career dropped off with the development of "talkies" and the end of the silent era.

== Filmography ==
Year	Film	Role	Director	Notes
1920	Hey, Rube!		Harold Beaudine	Short
1921	One Stormy Knight		Harold Beaudine	Short
1921	Take Your Time		Harold Beaudine	Short
1921	Three Jokers		Harold Beaudine	Short
1921	Rocking the Boat		Harold Beaudine	Short
1922	'Tis the Bull		Harold Beaudine	Short
1922	A Hickory Hick		Harold Beaudine	Short
1922	Hokus Pokus		Harold Beaudine	Short
1922	In Dutch		Harold Beaudine	Short
1922	Second Childhood		Harold Beaudine	Short
1922	Mile-a-Minute Mary		Harold Beaudine	Short
1923	Navy Blues		Harold Beaudine	Short
1923	Aggravatin' Papa		Harold Beaudine	Short
1923	Black and Blue		Harold Beaudine	Short
1923	Fool Proof		Harold Beaudine	Short
1923	Hot Water		Harold Beaudine	Short
1923	Plumb Crazy		Harold Beaudine	Short
1924	Nerve Tonic		Harold Beaudine	Short
1924	Safe and Sane		Harold Beaudine	Short
1924	French Pastry		Harold Beaudine	Short
1924	Easy Pickin's		Harold Beaudine	Short
1924	Why Hurry?		Harold Beaudine	Short
1925	For Sadie's Sake		Harold Beaudine	Short
1925	Air Tight		Harold Beaudine	Short
1925	Slippery Feet		Harold Beaudine	Short
1925	Be Careful		Harold Beaudine	Short
1925	Great Guns		Harold Beaudine	Short
1925	Sit Tight		Harold Beaudine	Short
1925	Step Fast		Harold Beaudine	Short
1926	Dodging Trouble		Harold Beaudine	Short
1926	Broken China		Harold Beaudine	Short
1926	Beauty à la Mud		Harold Beaudine	Short
1926	Mister Wife		Harold Beaudine	Short
1926	Dancing Daddy		Harold Beaudine	Short
1926	Wild and Woozy		Harold Beaudine	Short
1926	Dummy Love		Harold Beaudine	Short
1926	Fresh Faces		Harold Beaudine	Short
1926	Hoot Mon!		Harold Beaudine	Short
1927	Break Away		Harold Beaudine	Short
1927	Splash Yourself		Harold Beaudine	Short
1927	Crazy to Fly		Harold Beaudine	Short
1927	Dead Easy		Harold Beaudine	Short
1927	Holy Mackerel		Harold Beaudine	Short
1927	Queer Ducks		Harold Beaudine	Short
1927	Short Socks		Harold Beaudine	Short
1927	No Sparking		Harold Beaudine	Short
1927	Oh, Mummy!		Harold Beaudine	Short
1928	Goofy Ghosts		Harold Beaudine	Short
1928	Skating Home		Harold Beaudine	Short
1928	The Sock Exchange		Harold Beaudine	Short
1928	Baby Talks		Harold Beaudine	Short
1928	Believe It or Not		Harold Beaudine	Short
1928	Just the Type		Harold Beaudine	Short
1928	Loose Change		Harold Beaudine	Short
1928	Slippery Heels		Harold Beaudine	Short
1929	Brother for Sale		Harold Beaudine	Short
1929	No Boy Wanted		Harold Beaudine	Short
1930	His Bachelor Daddies		Harold Beaudine	Short
1930	Grounds for Murder		Harold Beaudine	Short
1930	Seeing Things		Harold Beaudine	Short
1930	For Art's Sake		Harold Beaudine	Short
1930	Barefoot Days		Harold Beaudine	Short
1930	Mush Again		Harold Beaudine	Short
1930	A Happy Little Honeymoon		Harold Beaudine	Short
1930	Neighbors		Harold Beaudine	Short
1930	His Public		Harold Beaudine	Short
1930	Seeing Off Service		Harold Beaudine	Short
1930	Stepping Out		Harold Beaudine	Short
1931	A College Racket		Harold Beaudine	Short
