= Old maid (disambiguation) =

An old maid is an older woman who has never married and never had children.

Old maid or Old Maid may also refer to:

== Games ==
- Old maid (card game), a simple game popular around the world, existing in many variants
- Alte Jungfer, a German card game (variant of Schrum-schrum) whose name translates as 'old maid'

== Film ==
- The Old Maid (1939 film), an American drama film starring Bette Davis
- The Old Maid (1972 film), a French film by Jean-Pierre Blanc

== Literature ==
- La Vieille Fille (novel) or The Old Maid, an 1836 novel by Honoré de Balzac
- The Old Maid (novella), a 1924 novella by Edith Wharton; basis for the 1935 play and the 1939 film
- The Old Maid (play), a 1935 play by Zoe Akins
- The Old Maid, a 1761 play by Arthur Murphy

== Other uses ==
- Catocala badia or old maid, an owlet moth species
- Old maid, an unpopped kernel in a batch of popped popcorn kernels
- Old Maid (HBC vessel), operated by the HBC from 1928 to 1930, see Hudson's Bay Company vessels

== See also ==
- The Old Maid and the Thief, a 1937 opera by Gian Carlo Menotti
- "Old Maid Boogie", a 1947 R&B song by Eddie Vinson
- Old maid's bonnets (Lupinus perennis), a flowering plant species in the family Fabaceae
- Old maid's insanity or erotomania
- Old maid's nightcap (Geranium maculatum), a flowering plant species in the family Geraniaceae
- Old-maid's-pink (Agrostemma), a flowering plant genus in the family Caryophyllaceae
