= The Old Maid (1939 film) =

1939 film by Edmund Goulding

- Theatrical release poster
- Directed by: Edmund Goulding
- Screenplay by: Casey Robinson
- Based on: The Old Maid 1924 novel by Edith Wharton; The Old Maid 1935 play by; Zoë Akins
- Produced by: Hal B. Wallis
- Starring: Bette Davis; Miriam Hopkins; George Brent; Donald Crisp
- Cinematography: Tony Gaudio
- Edited by: George Amy
- Music by: Max Steiner
- Production company: Warner Bros. Pictures
- Distributed by: Warner Bros. Pictures
- Release date: August 16, 1939
- Running time: 95 minutes
- Country: United States
- Language: English

The Old Maid is a 1939 American drama film directed by Edmund Goulding. The screenplay by Casey Robinson is based on the 1935 Pulitzer Prize-winning play of the same name by Zoë Akins, which was adapted from the 1924 Edith Wharton novella The Old Maid: the Fifties (taken from the collection of novellas Old New York).

== Plot ==
Set during the American Civil War, the story focuses on Charlotte Lovell and her cousin Delia, whose wedding day is disrupted when her former fiancé Clem Spender returns following a two-year absence. Delia proceeds to marry Jim Ralston, and Charlotte comforts Clem, who enlists in the Union Army and is later killed in battle. Shortly after his death, Charlotte discovers she is pregnant with Clem's child, and in order to escape the stigma of an illegitimate child, she journeys West to have her baby, a daughter she names Clementina (or "Tina").

Following the end of the war, Charlotte and Tina relocate to Philadelphia, where Charlotte opens an orphanage. Delia is the mother of two children, and Charlotte is engaged to marry Joe Ralston, her cousin's brother-in-law. On her wedding day, Charlotte tells Delia that Tina is her child by Clem, and Delia stops Joe from marrying Charlotte by telling him that she is in poor health. The cousins become estranged, but when Jim is killed in a horse riding accident, Delia invites Charlotte and Tina to move in with her and her children. Tina, unaware Charlotte is her birth mother, assumes the role of Delia's daughter and calls Charlotte her aunt.

Fifteen years pass and Tina has become spoiled; she is wooed by Lanning Halsey, whose wealthy parents don't approve of her because of her foundling background. Still unaware Charlotte is her mother, Tina resents what she considers her interference in her life, and when Delia offers to formally adopt her in order to provide her with a reputable name and a prominent position in society, she gladly accepts. Charlotte intends to tell Tina the truth before her wedding but finds herself unable to do so.

Charlotte confronts Delia and reveals she resents the fact both Clem and Tina loved Delia more than they did her. Delia tells Tina that Charlotte sacrificed her own happiness by refusing to marry a man who did not want to raise Tina as his own. Delia urges Tina to kiss Charlotte last when Tina prepares to depart with her new husband. Tina complies, and her gesture leaves Charlotte happy and willing to share the rest of her life with Delia as a friend rather than an adversary.

== Cast ==
- Bette Davis as Charlotte Lovell
- Miriam Hopkins as Delia Lovell Ralston
- George Brent as Clem Spender
- Jane Bryan as Clementina
- Donald Crisp as Dr. Lanskell
- Louise Fazenda as Dora
- James Stephenson as Jim Ralston
- Jerome Cowan as Joseph Ralston
- William Lundigan as Lanning Halsey
- Cecilia Loftus as Grandmother Henrietta Lovell
- William Hopper as John Ward (credited as DeWolf Hopper)
- Frederick Burton as Mr. Halsey (uncredited)

== Production ==
In 1935, the Los Angeles Times reported Ernst Lubitsch had purchased the screen rights to the Zoe Akins play and intended to cast Judith Anderson and Helen Menken, the stars of the Broadway production, in a film released by Paramount Pictures, but nothing came of the project. According to The Hollywood Reporter, Warner Bros. Pictures bought the rights from Paramount in January 1939.

Humphrey Bogart originally was cast as Clem Spender, but studio head Jack L. Warner felt he looked neither heroic nor romantic and had him fired after two days of filming. Bette Davis urged director Edmund Goulding and producer Hal B. Wallis to replace him with George Brent, who accepted the role despite the fact it was so small.

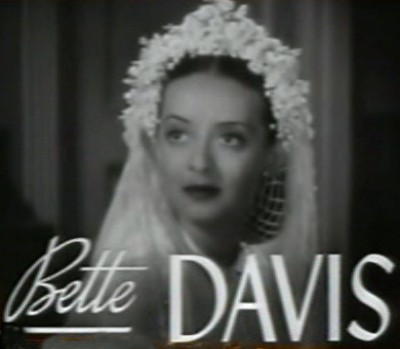
Bette Davis as Charlotte Lovell

This was the first film in which Davis had equal screen time with a female co-star. "I was never mad about the part," she recalled in her 1962 autobiography A Lonely Life, and she proposed she play both Charlotte and Delia. Instead, the more colorful role of Delia went to Miriam Hopkins, with whom Davis had worked in Rochester, New York when the two were part of George Cukor's stock company, where Hopkins was the star and Davis the ingenue. Hopkins resented the fact Davis had won the Academy Award for Best Actress for Jezebel, in which she recreated a role Hopkins had originated on Broadway, and she also was convinced Davis had an affair with Anatole Litvak during her marriage to the director, whom she was in the process of divorcing. As a result, she did everything she could to undermine her co-star's performance. "Miriam is a perfectly charming woman socially," Davis remembered. "Working with her is another story . . . Miriam used and, I must give her credit, knew every trick in the book. I became fascinated watching them appear one by one . . . Keeping my temper took its toll. I went home every night and screamed at everybody." Cinematographer Tony Gaudio complained that Hopkins kept altering the makeup designed by Perc Westmore in order to look considerably younger than Davis in the segments in which both were supposed to be aged. Both actresses cited illness for failing to appear on set at various times, and the production fell eleven days behind schedule.

The film's soundtrack includes "When Johnny Comes Marching Home" (anachronistically) by Patrick Gilmore, "The Battle Hymn of the Republic" by William Steffe and Julia Ward Howe, "(I Wish I Was in) Dixie's Land" by Daniel Decatur Emmett, "Oh My Darling, Clementine" by Percy Montrose, and "Jeanie with the Light Brown Hair" by Stephen Foster.

== Critical reception ==
Frank S. Nugent of The New York Times observed,

"It probably is not a good motion picture, in the strict cinematic sense, professing as it does such strict allegiance to its theatrical parent; unquestionably it is as dated as the Victorian morals code which scourges its heroine through eight or nine reels; in the rudest terminology, it is a tear-jerker. But there can be no doubt about its popularity. It should go on and on. For a bad play, it makes a surprisingly good drama; or, if you feel that way about it, for a good play it fits surprisingly well on the screen . . . Scenically, it is a trifle on the static side, which could not be avoided altogether. But dramatically it is vital, engrossing and a little terrifying . . . As the old maid, Miss Davis has given a poignant and wise performance, hard and austere of surface, yet communicating through it the deep tenderness, the hidden anguish of the heart-broken mother. Miss Hopkins's Delia is a less certain characterization, gentler than Miss Akins had contrived her, suggesting but seldom the malignance lurking beneath a charming manner."

The critic for Time thought the film was

"hardly more than the sum total of two good, sometimes brilliant, performances . . . Though the musty setting of The Old Maid is enough to make anyone susceptible to historical hay fever squirm, few will be unimpressed with the skill with which director Edmund Goulding manages his spirited costars. Instead of trying to divide the fat parts between them, he so deals out their histrionic diet that they bank as did Jack Spratt and his wife, cooperatively."

Variety called the film "stagey, sombre and generally confusing fare."

== Home media ==
On April 1, 2008, Warner Home Video released the film as part of the box set The Bette Davis Collection, Volume 3, which also includes All This, and Heaven Too, The Great Lie, In This Our Life, Watch on the Rhine and Deception.

== See also ==
- List of films and television shows about the American Civil War
