= Love and Learn =

Love and Learn may refer to:

- Love and Learn (1928 film), a film directed by Frank Tuttle
- Love and Learn (1947 film), a film directed by Frederick de Cordova
