= Old New York =

Old New York may refer to:

- Old New York (novellas), a collection of novellas by Edith Wharton
- New York City
- Futurama, a television show set in "New" (31st century) New York, built on the ruins of "Old" (21st century) New York
