= Zoe Akins =

American playwright, poet, and author (1886–1958)

- Born: Zoe Byrd Akins; October 30, 1886; Humansville, Missouri, U.S.
- Died: October 29, 1958 (aged 71); Los Angeles, California, U.S.
- Occupations: Playwright, screenwriter, novelist, poet
- Spouse: Hugo Rumbold (m. 1932; died 1932)
- Relatives: Laurie Metcalf (grandniece); Zoe Perry (great-grandniece)
- Writing career
- Years active: 1925-1958
- Notable awards: Pulitzer Prize for Drama (1935)

Zoe Byrd Akins (October 30, 1886 – October 29, 1958) was an American playwright, poet, and author. She won the 1935 Pulitzer Prize for drama for The Old Maid.

== Early life ==
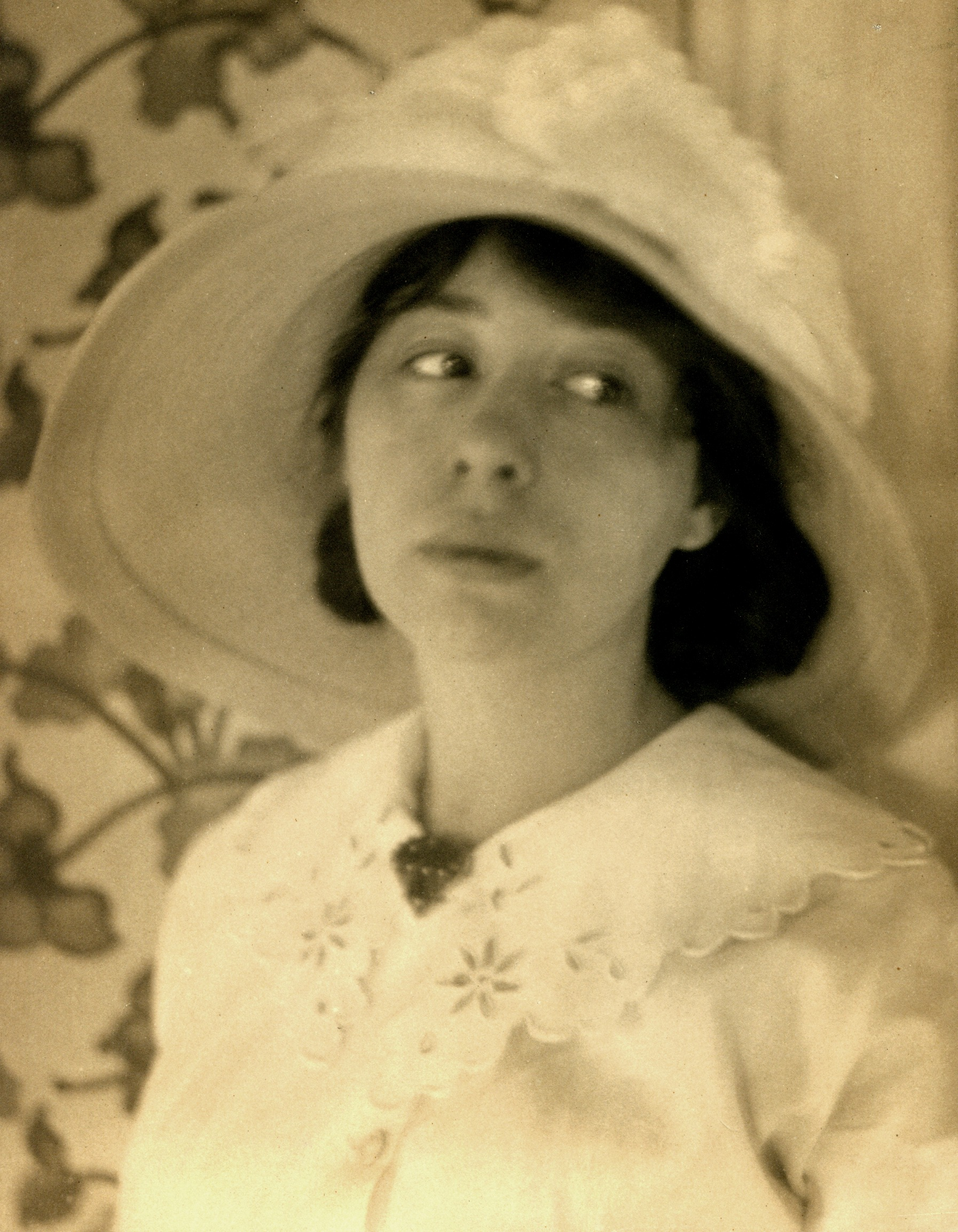
Zoe Akins in 1907

Zoe Byrd Akins was born in Humansville, Missouri, second of three children of Thomas Jasper and Sarah Elizabeth Green Akins. Her family was heavily involved with the Missouri Republican Party, and for several years her father served as the state party chairman. Through her mother, Akins was related to George Washington and Duff Green. Her family moved to St. Louis, Missouri when Akins was 11, due to her father's new job as postmaster. Given her family’s position and economic security, Akins was exposed to the arts, regulating the theatre, and developing an interest early on. She was sent to Monticello Seminary in Godfrey, Illinois for her education, where she received further encouragement and support for her literary and theatrical work through her English teacher Miss Alden. It was at Monticello Seminary that Akins wrote her first play, a parody of a Greek tragedy. She would later attend Hosmer Hall preparatory school in St. Louis where she continued writing various works, one of which was performed at her school. While at Hosmer Hall she was a classmate of poet Sara Teasdale, both graduating with the class of 1903. In school, Teasdale formed a student-run group called “The Potters”, a group which cultivated and supported female writers. Akins, having never received an invitation to join, was left out of the group, however connected with Teasdale following the groups dissolution. With Teasdale's reputation as accomplished individual and poet, publishing her first work in 1907, this relationship for Akins served as beneficial to her career, reinforcing her work ethic and writing style. Following graduation Akins began writing a series of plays, poetry and criticism for various magazines and newspapers as well as occasional acting roles in St. Louis area theatre productions.

== Influences ==
=== Significant figures ===
Zoë Akins’s mother, Sarah Elizabeth Green Akins, was influential in both Zoë’s education as well as her narrative style. When Zoë’s maternal grandfather died, the family inherited the family property, money, as well as a large library that exposed Zoë very early on to the literary figures such as Shakespeare and Greek Mythology, inspiring many of her later works. Her mother also seems to have a physical representation in her writings, as within many of Akins’s plays an older proper woman appears as a supporting character that very much represents her mother.

Outside of her family, Zoë Akins developed a friendship with actress Julia Marlowe. The two shared a mentoring relationship, with Marlowe's approach described as more business-minded and Akins' as more romantic. Akins dedicated her first poetry collection, Interpretations, to Marlowe.

Another notable influence for Zoë Akins was the relationship with William Marion Reedy, her publisher. Reedy helped Akins publish Interpretations, her first volume of poetry in 1912. His early support in Akins's career helped a great deal in establishing her as a writer.

=== Writing style ===
Much like the Shakespeare and Greek Mythology narratives that she grew up reading, Akins's writing style can be described as theatrical and poetic in nature, the whimsical nature of words and dialogue at its centre. Other similar styles include the work of Josephine Preston Peabody and William Vaughan Moody. She was, however, writing during a time when realism was the favoured writing style, leaving her poetic narrative style outside the popular norm.

== Career and life ==
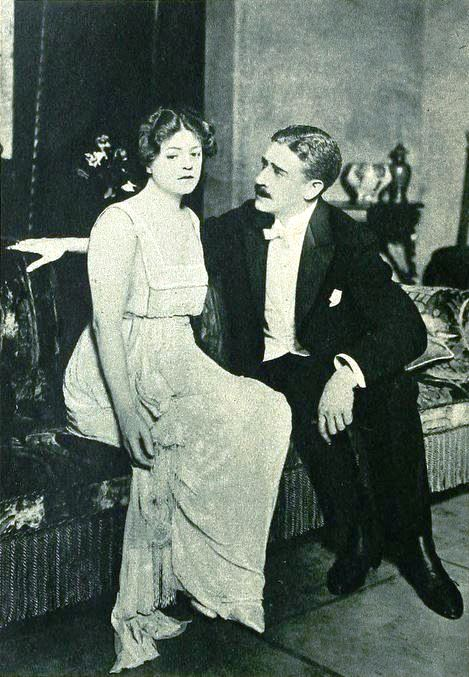
Ethel Barrymore and Claude King in the Broadway production of Déclassée (1919)

Having always had an interest in acting, Akins moved to New York in 1909, where she attempted to establish herself as an actress. Finding no success, she instead refocused on her writings, meeting the managing editor of McClure’s Willa Cather, who urged her to write for the stage. Her first major dramatic work was Papa, written in 1914, which was later produced in Los Angeles in November 1916 and New York in April 1919. The comedy failed even though it greatly impressed both H.L. Mencken and George Jean Nathan, and she continued to write. She followed up with two other plays, The Magical City and Déclassée. The Washington Square Players production of The Magical City, a one act tragedy, received a very positive review praising its depiction of the female subjects and their concerns. The latter play, which told the social decline of an English Lady starring Ethel Barrymore, was not only a great success but'"something of a sensation, and her days of waiting were over." In its Broadway production, it made $300,000, an early instance of Akins's financial success. During this time several of her early plays were adapted for the screen. These adaptations were mostly failures, released as silent films in a time when the industry was transitioning to sound. While some "talkie" stars had notable roles in the films (Walter Pidgeon and a young Clark Gable), most of the films are now believed to be lost. In 1930, Akins had another great success with her play, The Greeks Had a Word for It, a comedy about three models in search of rich husbands.

In the early 1930s, Akins became more active in film, writing several screenplays as well as continuing to sell the rights to plays such as The Greeks Had a Word for It (1930), which was adapted for the movies three times, in 1932 (as The Greeks Had a Word for Them), 1938 (as Three Blind Mice), and 1953 (How to Marry a Millionaire). Two highlights of this period were the films Sarah and Son (1930) and Morning Glory (1933), the latter remade as Stage Struck. Both films earned their respective female leads (Ruth Chatterton and Katharine Hepburn) Academy Award nominations for Best Actress, with Hepburn winning.

Akins did not pursue a screenwriting career beyond her early successes. In 1932, she married Hugo Rumbold (in the last year of his life) and, after several Hollywood films, she returned to writing plays and spending time with her family. She was rumored to be in a long-term relationship with Jobyna Howland until Howland's death in 1936. According to Anita Loos, the two squabbled often, "But such gibes actually held the key to their devotion." She was the great-aunt of actress Laurie Metcalf. She lived for a short time in Morrisonville, Illinois.

In 1935, she was awarded the Pulitzer Prize for Drama for her dramatization of Edith Wharton's The Old Maid, a melodrama set in New York City and written in five episodes stretching across time from 1839 to 1854. The play was adapted for a 1939 film starring Bette Davis.

In 1936, Akins co-wrote the screenplay for Camille, adapted from Alexandre Dumas's play and novel, La dame aux camélias. The film starred Greta Garbo, Robert Taylor, and Lionel Barrymore, and earned Garbo her third Oscar nomination.

== Later life and legacy ==
Akins died in her sleep on the eve of her 72nd birthday, in 1958, in Los Angeles. She is buried in San Gabriel District Cemetery.

Akins's archives are held in the collection of the Bancroft Library at the University of California, Berkeley.

== Selected filmography ==
- Déclassée (1925)
- Her Private Life (1929)
- Sarah and Son (1930)
- Anybody's Woman (1930)
- The Right to Love (1930)
- Working Girls (1931)
- The Greeks Had a Word for Them (1932)
- Christopher Strong (1933)
- Outcast Lady (1934)
- Accused (1936)
- Lady of Secrets (1936)
- Camille (1936)
- The Old Maid (1939)
- Zaza (1938)
