= Claude King (actor) =

English-American actor (1875–1941)

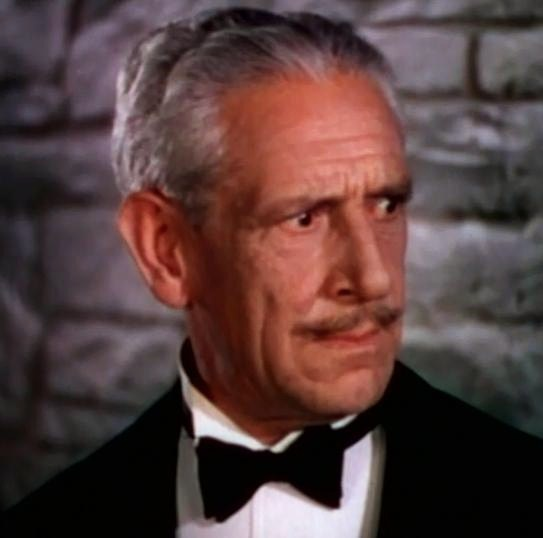
- Claude King in A Star Is Born (1937)
- Born: Claude Ewart King; 15 January 1875; Northampton, Northamptonshire, England
- Died: 18 September 1941 (aged 66); Los Angeles, California, U.S.
- Occupation: Actor
- Years active: 1912–1941
- Spouses: Evelyn Walsh Hall(1900-?)(1 child); Florence Evelyn Hall(1927-?)

Claude Ewart King (15 January 1875 – 18 September 1941) was an English-born character actor and unionist, who appeared in American silent film. With his distinctive wavy hair, King appeared on both stage and screen. He served his country, Great Britain, in World War I in Field Artillery, reaching the rank of Major and surviving the war. He began his stage career in his native country, before emigrating to the US. In 1919, he appeared on Broadway in support of Ethel Barrymore in the play Déclassée.

== Film ==
After gravitating to silent films, King had a key role in Tod Browning's lost silent masterpiece London After Midnight (1927), starring alongside Lon Chaney. Claude King was later an original member of the first Board of Directors of the Screen Actors' Guild (SAG) in 1933. He is the great-uncle of singer/songwriter Claude King and great-great-uncle of singer/songwriter Chris Aable, both also SAG members.

== Selected filmography ==
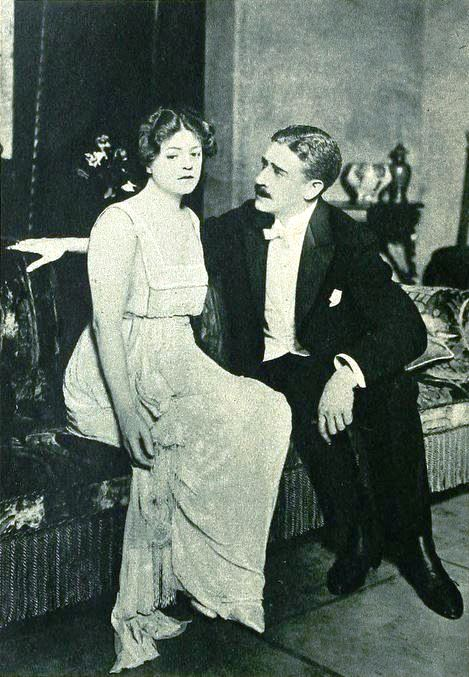
Ethel Barrymore and Claude King in Declassee (1919)

- Idols of Clay (1920) as Dr. Herbert
- The Scarab Ring (1921) as Hugh Martinn
- Why Girls Leave Home (1921) as Mr. Wallace
- Bella Donna (1923) as Dr. Meyer Isaacson
- Six Days (1923) as Lord Charles Chetwyn
- The Making of O'Malley (1925) as Capt. Collins
- The Knockout (1925) as J. van Dyke Parker
- The Unguarded Hour (1925) as Bryce Gilbert
- Irish Luck (1925) as Solicitor
- Paradise (1926) as Pollock
- The Silent Lover (1926) as Contarini
- Mr. Wu (1927) as Mr. Muir
- Singed (1927) as Ben Grimes
- Becky (1927) as Boris Abelard
- London After Midnight (1927) as Roger Balfour
- Love and Learn (1928) as Robert Blair
- Sporting Goods (1928) as Timothy Stanfield
- Red Hair (1928) as Thomas L. Burke
- A Night of Mystery (1928) as Marquis Boismartel
- Warming Up (1928) as Mr. Post
- Oh, Kay! (1928) as The Earl of Rutfield
- Outcast (1928) as John Moreland
- Desert Nights (1929) as The Real Lord Stonehill (uncredited)
- Blue Skies (1929) as Richard Danforth (episode 2)
- Strange Cargo (1929) as Yacht Captain
- The Black Watch (1929) as General in India
- Behind That Curtain (1929) as Sir George Mannering
- The Mysterious Dr. Fu Manchu (1929) as Sir John Petrie
- Madame X (1929) as Valmorin
- Son of the Gods (1930) as Bathurst
- Prince of Diamonds (1930) as Gilbert Crayle
- The Second Floor Mystery (1930) as Enright
- In Gay Madrid (1930) as Marques de Castelar
- Love Among the Millionaires (1930) as Mr. Hamilton
- Leathernecking (1930) as Minor Role (uncredited)
- Follow Thru (1930) as 'Mac' Moore
- Rango (1931) as The Man
- Doctors' Wives (1931) as Hospital Official (uncredited)
- Born to Love (1931) as Major General Visiting Hospital (uncredited)
- Women Love Once (1931) as Theodore Stewart
- Bad Girl (1931) as Dr. Burgess (uncredited)
- The Reckless Hour (1931) as Howard Crane
- Transatlantic (1931) as Captain (uncredited)
- The Phantom of Paris (1931) as Attorney (uncredited)
- Devotion (1931) as Arthur (uncredited)
- Once a Lady (1931) as Sir William Gresham
- Heartbreak (1931) as Count Walden
- Arrowsmith (1931) as Dr. Tubbs
- Working Girls (1931) as Mr. Adams (uncredited)
- Under Eighteen (1931) as Doctor (uncredited)
- Forbidden (1932) as Mr. Jones (uncredited)
- Lovers Courageous (1932) as Pawnbroker (uncredited)
- Shanghai Express (1932) as Mr. Albright (uncredited)
- Behind the Mask (1932) as Arnold
- The Painted Woman (1932) as English Officer (uncredited)
- McKenna of the Mounted (1932) as Brady - Commissioner (uncredited)
- Smilin' Through (1932) as Richard Clare (uncredited)
- Six Hours to Live (1932) as Conference Chairman (uncredited)
- Sherlock Holmes (1932) as Sir Albert Hastings (uncredited)
- Cavalcade (1933) as Speaker (uncredited)
- Mystery of the Wax Museum (1933) as Mr. Galatalin
- He Learned About Women (1933) as Drake
- Pleasure Cruise (1933) as Sir James Montgomery (uncredited)
- Hello, Sister! (1933) as Dr. A. Peterson
- Kiss of Araby (1933) as Maj. J.W. Courtney
- Pilgrimage (1933) as Ship Captain (uncredited)
- The Big Brain (1933) as Minor Role (uncredited)
- The Masquerader (1933) as Lakely
- Charlie Chan's Greatest Case (1933) as Capt. Arthur Cope
- Meet the Baron (1933) as Explorer (uncredited)
- White Woman (1933) as C.M. Chisholm
- Long Lost Father (1934) as Inspector Townsley
- The Mystery of Mr. X (1934) as Cummings (uncredited)
- Coming Out Party (1934) as Stanhope's Attorney (uncredited)
- Stolen Sweets (1934) as Henry Belmont
- City Park (1934) as General Horace G. Stevens
- Murder in Trinidad (1934) as Sir Ellery Bronson - Governor
- Born to Be Bad (1934) as Party Guest Admiring Letty (uncredited)
- Now I'll Tell (1934) as Ship Captain (uncredited)
- The World Moves On (1934) as Colonel Braithwaite
- The Moonstone (1934) as Sir Basil Wynard
- Charlie Chan in London (1934) as RAF Aerodrome Commander (uncredited)
- Two Heads on a Pillow (1934) as Albert Devonshire
- The Lives of a Bengal Lancer (1935) as Experienced Clerk (uncredited)
- The Gilded Lily (1935) as Boat Captain
- The Right to Live (1935) as Mr. Pride
- Circumstantial Evidence (1935) as Ralph Winters
- Smart Girl (1935) as James Reynolds
- Bonnie Scotland (1935) as Gen. Fletcher (uncredited)
- The Dark Angel (1935) as Sir Mordaunt (uncredited)
- The Last Outpost (1935) as General
- It's in the Air (1935) as Sir Phillips (scenes deleted)
- Personal Maid's Secret (1935) as Mr. B. Abercrombie (uncredited)
- 1,000 Dollars a Minute (1935) as Robinson (uncredited)
- The Perfect Gentleman (1935) as Man at April's Party (uncredited)
- The Great Impersonation (1935) as Sir Gerald Hume
- The Leathernecks Have Landed (1936) as British Agent in Shanghai
- The Country Doctor (1936) as Toastmaster (uncredited)
- Three on the Trail (1936) as J. P. Ridley
- It Couldn't Have Happened – But It Did (1936) as Ellis Holden
- The Last of the Mohicans (1936) as Duke of Marlborough
- Happy Go Lucky (1936) as Col. Wallis
- Beloved Enemy (1936) as Colonel Loder
- Jungle Jim (1937, Serial) as Territorial Consul Gilbert [Ch.1]
- Maytime (1937) as Noble at Court (uncredited)
- A Star is Born (1937) as John (uncredited)
- The Girl from Scotland Yard (1937) as Sir Eric Ledyard
- Love Under Fire (1937) as Cunningham
- Lancer Spy (1937) as Captain
- Man-Proof (1938) as Man at Party (uncredited)
- Four Men and a Prayer (1938) as Gen. Bryce
- Marie Antoinette (1938) as Choisell (uncredited)
- Booloo (1938) as Maj. Fenton
- The Chaser (1938) as Judge at Harvey's Trial (uncredited)
- If I Were King (1938) as Courtier (uncredited)
- Within the Law (1939) as Art Dealer
- Broadway Serenade (1939) as Mr. Gato (uncredited)
- Lady of the Tropics (1939) as Passenger on Yacht (uncredited)
- Remember? (1939) as Member of Bronsons' Fox Hunt (uncredited)
- The Earl of Chicago (1940) as Yeoman Usher (uncredited)
- The Ghost Comes Home (1940) as Chester B. Morlick - Thomas' Lawyer (uncredited)
- Susan and God (1940) as L.F. (uncredited)
- New Moon (1940) as Monsieur Dubois
- The Golden Fleecing (1940) as Clerk (uncredited)
- The Howards of Virginia (1940) as Governor of Virginia (uncredited)
- The Philadelphia Story (1940) as Uncle Willie's Butler (uncredited)
- Free and Easy (1941) as Chemin de Fer Player Wanting Half of Bet (uncredited)
- Dr. Jekyll and Mr. Hyde (1941) as Uncle Geoffrey (uncredited) (final film role)
