= Sarah and Son =

1930 film

- Directed by: Dorothy Arzner
- Written by: Zoë Akins; Timothy Shea (novel)
- Starring: Ruth Chatterton; Fredric March
- Cinematography: Charles Lang
- Edited by: Verna Willis
- Music by: Oscar Potoker
- Distributed by: Paramount Pictures
- Release date: March 14, 1930
- Running time: 86 minutes
- Country: United States
- Language: English

Sarah and Son is a 1930 pre-Code American drama film directed by Dorothy Arzner. The screenplay by Zoë Akins was adapted from Timothy Shea's novel of the same name. It stars Ruth Chatterton, Fredric March, Gilbert Emery, and Doris Lloyd. It was filmed at Paramount Studios in Los Angeles and released by Paramount Pictures. The film also was shown with the alternate title of "Cradle Song", a copy of which can be found at https://archive.org/details/CradleSong1930RuthChattertonFredricMarchPhilippeDeLacy

== Plot ==
Sarah Storm, an Austrian immigrant, has taken up with Jim Grey, with the goal of both of them becoming vaudeville entertainers. Months after their stage debut, they now have a baby boy and no steady income, and Jim expresses little interest in finding work or supporting the family. After a fight with Sarah, Jim tries to get a loan from John Ashmore, a wealthy businessman, who denies his request, but mentions his envy at Jim's fatherhood, since his wife cannot bear children. On a whim, Jim enlists with the Marines for four years, and goes drinking. After returning home and quarreling again with Sarah, he disappears with their young son Bobby, intending to sell him to the Ashmores. The heartbroken Sarah is given a job singing with an itinerant musician, Cyril Belloc.

Two years later, Cyril and Sarah perform for WWI veterans in a hospital. As she goes among the beds of the wounded soldiers, she finds Jim there, near death. He begs forgiveness for his actions, and tells her about giving her son to the Ashmores. When she pleads with John Ashmore to let her see if their son is hers, Ashmore refuses, threatening to have her committed; their attorney, Howard Vanning, who is also Ashmore's brother-in-law, takes pity on her and says he will try to help, but also believes her delusional. Sarah leaves America for Germany to pursue her singing career.

Years later, Sarah has become an internationally famous opera singer, and returns to New York to perform. She reconnects with Vanning, declares she is no longer afraid of any threats the Ashmores can levy against her, and again demands to meet the boy, saying a birthmark will prove her is her son. Meanwhile, Bobby is now 13, and unhappy with the too-protective Ashmores, confiding to his uncle Howard that he fears being incapable of being a self-sufficient man. Still refusing to agree to a meeting, Mrs. Ashmore presents in his stead the deaf mute son of one of their servants, hoping this will convince Sarah he is not her son. Bobby, unbeknownst to his adoptive parents, runs away to the summer house of his uncle Howard. Howard, who is now fully in love with Sarah, brings her to the house unaware of Bobby's presence, and finally engineers an encounter between them.

== Cast ==
- Ruth Chatterton as Sarah Storm
- Fredric March as Howard Vanning
- Fuller Mellish Jr. as Jim Grey (Mellish died on February 8, 1930, shortly before the movie's release)
- Gilbert Emery as John Ashmore
- Doris Lloyd as Mrs. Ashmore (Vanning's sister)
- William Stack as Cyril Belloc
- Philippe De Lacy as Bobby

== Reception ==
The New York Times praised the performances and most of the screenplay, faulting only some aspects of plot development. It offered as praise: "Sarah and Son is one of the few audible pictures which are really good enough to warrant criticism of the development of the story, and no matter what are its minor shortcomings, it is an emphatically ingratiating entertainment."

== Awards ==
- Ruth Chatterton was nominated for the Academy Award for Best Actress for her performance in Sarah and Son. Her character's evolution from an immigrant with a strong Austrian accent to a successful celebrity with just a trace of an accent appeared alongside Greta Garbo's heavily accented performance in her first talkie.
