= Déclassée (play) =

1919 play by Zoe Akins

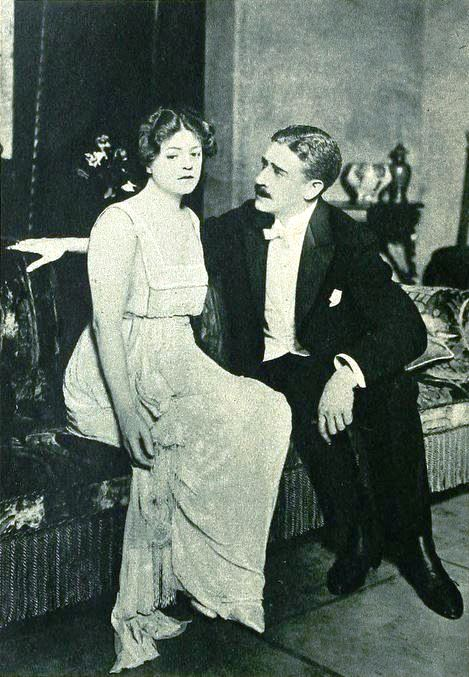
- Ethel Barrymore and Claude King
- Original language: English
- Written by: Zoe Akins
- Subject: Social and financial downfall of an aristocrat
- Genre: Drama
- Setting: A London drawing room, a Manhattan hotel lounge and townhouse.

Premiere
- Date: October 6, 1919
- Place: Empire Theatre
- Directed by: Iden Payne

Déclassée more commonly known as Declassee, is a 1919 play by Zoe Akins. A three-act drama with as many settings, it has twenty-five speaking parts. The action of the play takes place over three years time. The story concerns a English noblewoman who loses her place in society through pride, caprice, misplaced affection, and adherence to her own code of honor.

The play was produced by the business heirs of Charles Frohman, and staged by Iden Payne. It starred Ethel Barrymore, with Vernon Steele and Claude King in support. It had a brief tryout in Atlantic City during October 1919, and premiered in Manhattan the same month. It ran the entire season on Broadway, ending in May 1920 after 262 performances. Burns Mantle included Déclassée among his compilation of The Best Plays of 1919-20.

Déclassée was adapted for a 1925 silent film of the same name, and for a 1929 early talkie called Her Private Life.

== Characters ==
Characters are listed in order of appearance within their scope.

Lead

- Lady Helen Haden is a spirited and extravagant English lady of colorful ancestry, last of her line. (Note: She is the daughter of an earl, and so referred to in the play's dialogue as "Lady Helen" rather than "Lady Haden", or "Helen, Lady Haden" after her divorce, as the wife of a baronet normally would be.)

Supporting

- Harry Charteris is an artistic upper class friend of Lady Helen, who he adores but cannot afford.
- Edward Thayer is a young American mining engineer who Lady Helen has befriended and sponsored in society.
- Rudolph Solomon is a New York City self-made multi-millionaire; middle-aged, cultured and wise.

Featured

- Lady Wildering called Edith, is Sir Emmett's American wife and a friend of Lady Helen.
- Mrs. Leslie called Rena, is twice-widowed, shallow and an ingrate to Lady Helen who sponsored her.
- Charlotte Ashley is a popular English actress, also a friend of Lady Helen.
- Sir Emmett Wildering is an author and professional diplomat, later ambassador to America.
- Sir Bruce Haden is Lady Helen's husband, a loutish but successful butcher awarded a baronetcy.
- Jean is the head waiter at the hotel, who has had occasion to wait upon Lady Helen in several cities.
- Zellito is a Spanish Gypsy, a dancer and amateur fortuneteller, who prefers generosity to fidelity in men.
- Alice Vance is the gentle star of a Broadway musical, a reformed kleptomaniac, and in love with Rudolph.
- Walters is the butler to Rudolph Solomon. (Note: This character is referred to as The Servant in the published play.)
- Count Paolo del Magiore is a young Italian man Mrs. Leslie brings to Solomon's house.

Uncredited and bit players

- Brandon is the butler to Sir Bruce Haden.
- Miss Timmins is a middle-aged spinster, secretary to Lady Helen Haden.
- The Young Man, The Young Woman, and The Older Woman; The Man and The Woman; hotel lounge patrons.
- The Waiter
- The Three Wonderful Waltons, Croatian acrobats in New York, guests of Lady Helen at tea.
- Hotel orchestra and servants

== Synopsis ==
Zoe Akins had a self-confessed abhorrence for rewriting plays, and insisted Déclassée was presented on stage as she first imagined it. She specified further that only two minor cuts and one important deletion from the original play were made by Iden Payne in staging it.

Act I (The drawing room of Sir Bruce Haden's London home. Evening) The scene opens on the aftermath of an argument at a bridge party. Sir Bruce Haden has accused Edward Thayer and Mrs. Leslie of cheating, and ordered Thayer to leave. Lady Helen sprang to Thayer's defense, saying she would leave too unless Sir Bruce apologized. This much is learned from the conversation of Harry Charteris, Sir Emmett Wildering, Charlotte Ashley, Mrs. Wildering, and Mrs. Leslie before the three antagonists appear. Thayer appears first, as the ladies fetch Lady Helen back from her room. To everyone's surprise, Sir Bruce Haden apologizes to Thayer. Lady Helen and Thayer have a long discussion; he reminds her she led him to believe she cared in the letters she wrote. But Lady Helen says that he was only a passing interest to her, and that they must not see each other again. The bridge games resume, and there is a momentary darkening of the stage to denote the passage of an hour. As the light rises, a furious Lady Helen excoriates Thayer and Mrs. Leslie for cheating again. She astonishes Thayer by insisting he now apologize to Sir Bruce. Thayer refuses; his reputation will be ruined if Sir Bruce talks. Thayer threatens to show her letters to Sir Bruce if she insists. Disgusted, Lady Helen calls Sir Bruce and the others back into the room and starts to tell them everything. (Curtain)

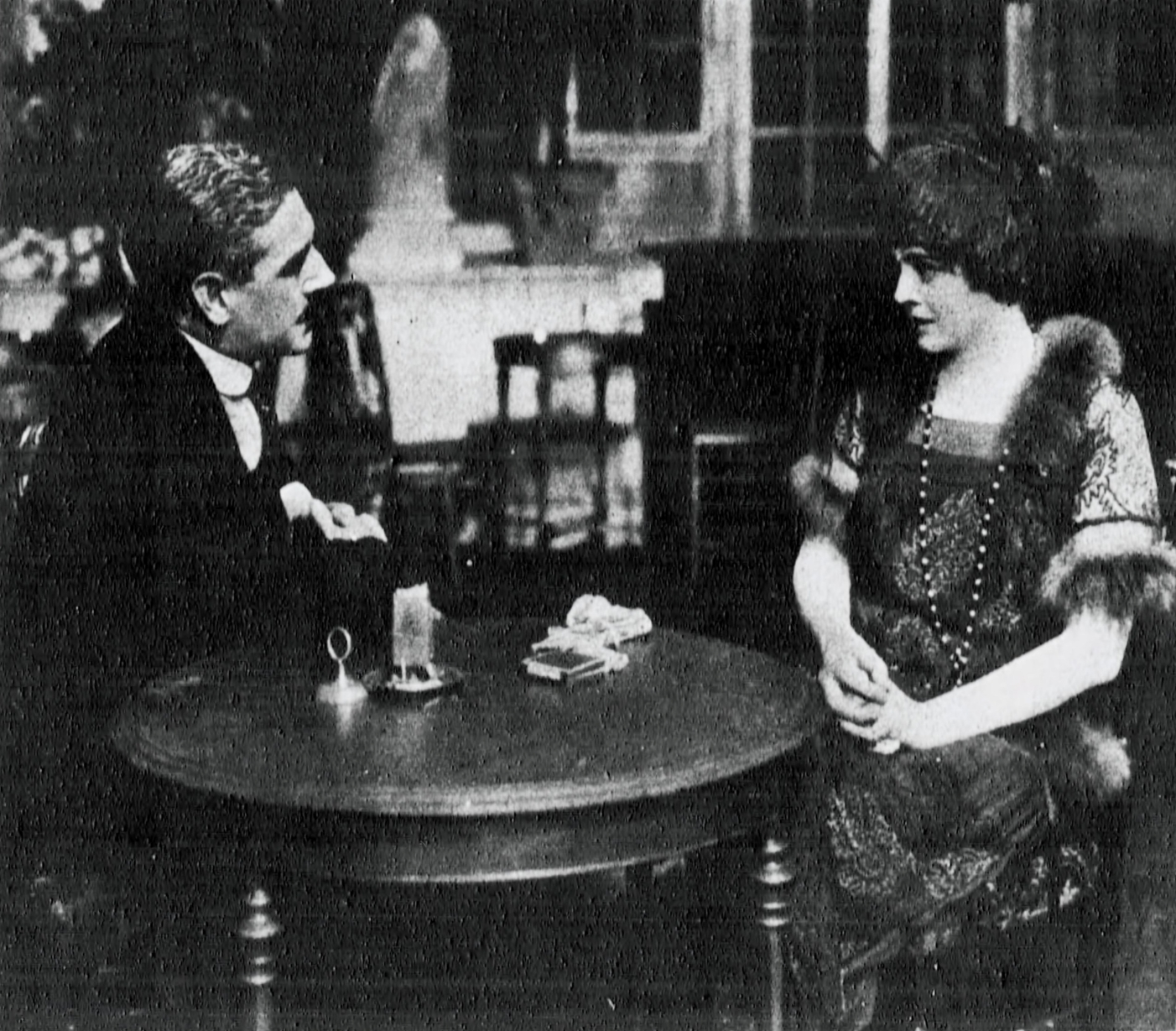

Act II (The lounge of a Manhattan deluxe hotel. Three years later, late Friday afternoon.) The scene opens on a busy lounge room, with numerous tables occupied by bit players, whose conversation provides the following exposition: Sir Emmett Wildering, newly appointed ambassador, and Lady Wildering are on their way to Washington, D. C. They meet Charlotte Ashley, now appearing in a Broadway play, for tea. Lady Helen enters, and arranges a table with Jean for some guests coming later. She too comes in for background gossip, this time by the Wilderings and Charlotte, whom she hasn't yet seen. It appear that Sir Bruce waited a year before divorcing her, and in the two years since has remarried and acquired twin sons. Now enter Zellito and Alice Vance, and again the bit players' talk identifies them and gives their stories. The two women are seated by Jean, who next greets Lady Helen. Harry Charteris, who also came to New York, has joined the other English at their table. Spotting them at last, Lady Helen braces herself and approaches their table. They greet her in a cautious but friendly way, and make plans to get together soon. Lady Helen now joins the guests at her table as the English quartet depart. Rudolph Solomon is also there, and The Three Wonderful Waltons. Lady Helen senses Alice's disquiet at Rudolph's attention to her. Later, when they are alone, Lady Helen rejects Rudolph's suggestion to keep her, because Alice really loves him. Nevertheless, she accepts his invitation for a dinner party next Friday. As the check arrives, Lady Helen pulls off a pearl ring, her last jewel, and presents it to Jean, to cover the bill and the waiter's tip. (Curtain)

Act III (The home of Rudolph Solomon. One week later, a Friday evening.) Lady Helen is delighted to see the exquisite items Rudolph Solomon has collected in Europe, including some treasures that once belonged to her own ancestors. She explains to Lady Wildering and Charlotte that the Gainsborough portrait on one wall is her own great-grandmother, who fell off a horse and died at age 30. Harry Charteris urges Lady Helen to stop her reckless ways and let someone take care of her. She is touched, but tells him "if I were your mother I would not let you marry me". Harry urges her to accept Rudolph then and stop drifting. Alice Vance arrives late and tells Rudolph she has given notice to her musical and will leave for Paris. She knows his fascination for Lady Helen and will set him free to pursue her. Rudolph presents Lady Helen with a string of pearls, made from those she had previously sold. He then tells her about Alice, and hints at marriage but does not propose yet. Lady Helen is ready to acquiesce, but the sudden uninvited entrance of Mrs. Leslie ends this opportunity. Mrs. Leslie is aghast at Lady Helen's presence and cuts her, at which Harry Charteris reminds her of how she cheated at cards in Lady Helen's home. Mrs. Leslie blames Edward Thayer, at which Rudolph suddenly has an epiphany: it is Thayer whom Lady Helen once loved but rejected. Thayer is now wealthy from diamond mines he discovered in South Africa, and is coming to the party. Determined to reunite them, he tells Lady Helen that he now thinks they shouldn't marry, then goes off to find Thayer. Lady Helen has misunderstood; she thinks even Rudolph now rejects her. Taking off the pearls, she wanders out into the street and is hit by a taxi cab. Mortally injured, she is brought into the house but dies as Thayer tries to tell her he loves her. (Curtain)

== Original production ==
=== Background ===
Ethel Barrymore precipitated the writing of this play by giving a public recitation of a poem by Zoe Akins. The author then decided to write a play for Barrymore. Akins said she wrote this very quickly, starting from the idea of a woman who loses social position but not her sense of self. Her main theme was the loneliness of the situation, which the author augmented by putting her into a city and land strange to her. Akins sold the play to Charles Frohman, Inc., which in July 1919 announced its production for the coming season, to star Barrymore.

When Charles Frohman died in 1915, his heirs formed Charles Frohman, Inc. to continue his theatrical business. Charles Frohman, Inc. held Ethel Barrymore's contract and produced the plays in which she appeared. By July 1919, however, Charles Frohman, Inc. was owned by Famous Players–Lasky, part of growing trend in which movie money was financing Broadway stage productions. The play's advent came as negotiations between the Actors' Equity Association and the Producing Managers Association broke off and a general strike was called in August 1919. Ethel Barrymore informed Charles Frohman Inc. that she would not attend rehearsals of Zoe Akins' new play until the strike was settled. The strike was settled by September 6, 1919, and the title of the as yet unnamed play was soon announced as Déclassée.

Claude King and Julian Royce were both brought over from London to support Ethel Barrymore. Beatrice Beckley and Katherine Harris were the next cast members announced, with the rest of the principals named by September 23, 1919.

=== Cast ===
Principals only from the Atlantic City tryout through the Broadway run.
Role	Actor	Dates	Notes and sources
Lady Helen Haden	Ethel Barrymore	Oct 02, 1919 - May 15, 1920	The theatre was dark for four performances in late March 1920 due to her laryngitis.
Harry Charteris	Charles Francis	Oct 02, 1919 - May 15, 1920	
Edward Thayer	Vernon Steele	Oct 02, 1919 - Apr 01, 1920	
Edward Thayer	Leslie Austen	Apr 02, 1920 - May 15, 1920	
Rudolph Solomon	Claude King	Oct 02, 1919 - May 15, 1920	
Lady Wildering	Clare Eames	Oct 02, 1919 - May 15, 1920	
Charlotte Ashley	Beatrice Beckley	Oct 02, 1919 - Apr 23, 1920	Beckley left to join her husband James K. Hackett on a European tour.
Charlotte Ashley	TBD	Apr 24, 1919 - May 15, 1920	
Mrs. Leslie	Katherine Harris	Oct 02, 1919 - May 15, 1920	Ethel Barrymore surprised society by urging her ex-sister-in-law be cast for this character.
Sir Emmett Wildering	Julian Royce	Oct 02, 1919 - May 15, 1920	
Sir Bruce Haden	Harry Plimmer	Oct 02, 1919 - May 15, 1920	
Jean	Alfred Hesse	Oct 02, 1919 - May 15, 1920	
Zellito	Gabrielle Ravine	Oct 02, 1919 - May 15, 1920	A Belgian actress who had success in Paris before coming to New York.
Alice Vance	Madeline Delmar	Oct 02, 1919 - Dec 20, 1919	Delmar left for a part in Earl Carroll's new comedy The Way to Heaven.
Alice Vance	Margaret Greene	Dec 22, 1919 - May 15, 1920	
Walters	Frank McCoy	Oct 02, 1919 - Oct 04, 1919	McCoy was used only in the Atlantic City tryout.
Walters	Edward Le Hay	Oct 06, 1919 - May 15, 1920	
Count Paolo	Ralf Belmont	Oct 02, 1919 - May 15, 1920	

=== Tryout ===
Déclassée had a three-day tryout starting October 2, 1919 at Nixon's Apollo Theatre in Atlantic City, New Jersey. The local critic said "the story suggests the pages of Thackeray", and noted "the appearance of Miss Barrymore is always a theatrical event". They judged the second act had some weaknesses, the third act worked only because of Barrymore, but they also wondered how a collision with a taxi cab could leave a woman so unmarked as Lady Helen was at the end of the play. Their summery of the play was its "undercurrent throughout is of sadness pitched in a minor key".

=== Broadway premiere and reception ===
“There are analytical minds who will say of this portion of the play, and, perhaps, one or two others, that they are quite impossible and unreal, but plays are not for such stalwart minds. In the three-quarters of an hour which has passed since we saw the play we have ridden in the subway, read about Hod Eller's pitching and got down to the hard business of writing, and we remember now that in the last act Lady Helen Haden was run over by a taxicab and came back to die deliberately and beautifully without so much as a smudge on her gown. But we didn't think of that until now. In the theatre the stratagem prevailed utterly, and we wept with all the other folk...”
—Heywood Broun on the death scene in Déclassée

The play had its Broadway premiere at the Empire Theatre on October 6, 1919. Instead of Thackeray, the reviewer for The Brooklyn Daily Eagle said "it smells a little of Pinero", but added Zoe Akins' dialogue was far more subtle, and her future as a playwright assured. As a 17-year-old neophyte with her uncle's company in 1896, Ethel Barrymore's first appearance on stage would generate surprising enthusiasm from the audience. Now, as a 40-year-old mother of three, her reception was just as fervid: "When Miss Barrymore appeared several minutes elapsed before she could proceed".

The Brooklyn Daily Times critic thought Zoe Akins wise to avoid a happy ending, despite some disappointment among the first-night audience. That critic did wonder why Lady Helen still loved the caddish Edward Thayer, and why she died sitting up: "Isolde and Thais, Camille and Mimi, died on their back and managed to sing at the same time". Charles Darnton wondered at the extent of sentiment for England in a drama by an American. He thought Rudolph Solomon "a cleverly and mercilessly drawn character" and that Claude King did an excellent job portraying him.

Alexander Woollcott had high regard for the play's dialogue: "It is difficult to remember when last a play came this way with text so continuously interesting to hear. Many of the passages have genuine beauty. All of them are clean-cut, sound and true." Woollcott shared with other reviewers the rapturous admiration for Ethel Barrymore, but had praise for Claude King and other players, with the exception of Vernon Steele, whom he found "conspicuously inadequate". Woollcott was also hard on director Iden Payne for the "appallingly set and staged" second act. Arthur Pollock said that when called to give a curtain speech after the second act, Zoe Akins told the audience she always disliked simulating graciousness in public but this time felt like doing it. Pollock said of Akins "Her mind is not cast in a conventional mould and her talents have not grown fat on traditions. She brings something fresh to the theater".

=== Broadway closing ===
Déclassée closed at the Empire Theatre on May 15, 1920, after 262 performances. When the first annual volume of The Best Plays series was published in June 1920, editor Burns Mantle included Déclassée among the nine best works of the season.

== Adaptations ==
=== Film ===
- Déclassée - 1925 silent film adaptation by Bradley King and Charles G. Whittaker, directed by Robert G. Vignola, and starring Corinne Griffith.
- Her Private Life - A 1929 Vitaphone film, starring Billie Dove and Walter Pidgeon.

== Bibliography ==
- Burns Mantle (ed). The Best Plays of 1919-20 And The Year Book Of The Drama In America. Small, Maynard & Company, 1920.
- Zoe Akins. Déclassée: Daddy's Gone A-Hunting: And Greatness- A Comedy. Boni and Liveright, 1923.
