= Hugo Rumbold =

English theatrical designer (1884–1932)

Rumbold in 1932

Hugo Cecil Levinge Rumbold (7 February 1884 – 19 November 1932) was an English designer of theatrical scenery and costumes. Among those who commissioned designs from him were Sir Herbert Tree, Sir Thomas Beecham, Arthur Bourchier and Rupert D'Oyly Carte.

== Life and career ==
Rumbold was born in Stockholm, the younger son of the diplomat Sir Horace Rumbold and his second wife, Louisa Anne (d. 1940), daughter of Thomas Russell Crampton. His elder half-brother was another diplomat, also called Horace Rumbold.

Rumbold went to Eton in 1897. He was commissioned a second lieutenant in the 7th (Militia) Battalion of the Rifle Brigade (The Prince Consort's Own) in 1901 and served in South Africa during the Second Boer War. He was promoted to lieutenant in June 1902, the same month the war ended, and soon returned to England. He served with the Grenadier Guards in the First World War, during which he was wounded and received the Order of the Crown (Belgium). In civilian life, he was sometimes referred to by his military title of Captain H. C. L. Rumbold.

=== Stage design ===
Rumbold's costumes for Patience

As a stage designer, Rumbold's early work included "Pre-Raphaelite" sets and costumes for William Faversham's Romeo and Juliet in 1913; and Tudor décor and costumes for Arthur Bourchier's production of Bluff King Hal, the following year. The Observer considered Rumbold's contribution the best thing about the show, and said, "His costumes and his scenes at Greenwich, Westminster and Hampton Court show considerable power of being original within the limits of archaeology and probability; and, though inexperience peeps out here and there, the work as a whole is splendid and beautiful." In the following years his designs included The Right to Kill, a melodrama set in Turkey staged by Sir Herbert Tree at His Majesty's Theatre; and Charles Villiers Stanford's opera The Critic (based on Sheridan's play of the same name) at the Shaftesbury Theatre in 1916, of which The Times said, "Mr Hugo Rumbold apparently carries the 18th century atmosphere about in his pocket." He also designed L'Apres Midi d'un Faune in 1916.

Rumbold was commissioned by Rupert D'Oyly Carte to dress a 1918 revival of Gilbert and Sullivan's Patience, in succession to W. S. Gilbert, who designed the original costumes, and Percy Anderson, who dressed the 1907 revival. Some of Rumbold's costumes (for the "everyday young girls") were retained by the D'Oyly Carte Opera Company until Peter Goffin's new designs were introduced in 1957. For Sir Thomas Beecham, Rumbold designed revivals of La fille de Madame Angot, by Lecocq, and Mozart's Le Nozze di Figaro staged at the Theatre Royal, Drury Lane in 1919. In the same year he designed the first British production of Ravel's L'heure espagnole for Covent Garden. Rumbold designed a revival of Bernard Shaw's Arms and the Man at the Duke of York's Theatre in 1919, and The Tempest for Viola Tree's company at the Aldwych Theatre in 1921.

=== Other theatrical work ===
In 1920, Rumbold acted as impresario, producing Darius Milhaud's new ballet, Le bœuf sur le toit at the Coliseum Theatre, under the title The Nothing Doing Bar. This departure from his milieu was noted in his obituary notice in The Times, which said: "He was essentially a Bohemian and a clubman, who was witty and amusing and always tried to pass on his zest for life to others.... Later, he took to film-producing. He was indeed something of a dilettante and dabbler in many pursuits. Had he been more of a 'sticker' he would have made more of a name for himself." With Zoe Akins, he wrote The Human Elephant, a play in three acts adapted from the short story of that title by Somerset Maugham.

=== Personal life and death ===
Rumbold was described as "one of the Last of the Dandies" and a "brilliant flâneur". He was a member of Noël Coward's set, with a penchant for cross-dressing in pursuit of comic turns at parties, according to Coward's biographer Philip Hoare and Faith Compton Mackenzie, whose clothes he borrowed in 1904. Despite the mutual hostility of Coward and the Sitwells, Rumbold maintained a friendship with all of them. Charlie Chaplin said that as a mimic he had never known anyone to compare with Rumbold. In the last year of his life, Rumbold married the dramatist Zoe Akins.

Rumbold died in Pasadena, California, in 1932, aged 48, from an illness caused by his injuries in World War I. He is buried at San Gabriel Cemetery, San Gabriel, California.
