= Edwin B. Willis =

American motion picture set designer & decorator (1893-1963)

Edwin Booth Willis
- Born: January 28, 1893; Decatur, Illinois, U.S.
- Died: November 26, 1963 (aged 70); Hollywood, California, U.S.
- Occupations: Motion picture set designer & decorator
- Years active: 1925–1957
- Relatives: Verna Willis (sister); Lionel Lindon (nephew)

Edwin Booth Willis (January 28, 1893 – November 26, 1963) was an American motion picture set designer and decorator.

Willis worked exclusively at Metro-Goldwyn-Mayer studios for his entire career. During his career as a set designer Willis worked on over 600 separate productions. The Internet Movie Database lists his 577 film credits as set decorator, 163 credits as interior decorator and 24 credits as art director.

He was nominated for the Academy Award in his profession 32 times, in certain years receiving multiple nominations. Willis won the Oscar on eight occasions. He was born in Decatur, Illinois and died of cancer in Hollywood, in 1963.

== Personal life ==
Willis was romantically linked to Sydney Guilaroff, who was known as the first single man to adopt children in America (two sons named Jon and Eugene).

== Major awards ==
=== Academy Awards ===
Interior decoration (Color)

- Blossoms in the Dust - 1941
- The Yearling - 1946

Interior decoration (Black & white)

- Gaslight - 1944

Art direction/Set decoration (Color)

- Little Women - 1949
- An American in Paris - 1951

Art direction/Set decoration (Black & white)

- The Bad and the Beautiful - 1952
- Julius Caesar - 1953
- Somebody Up There Likes Me - 1956

=== Academy Award nominations ===
Interior decoration

- The Great Ziegfeld - 1936
- Romeo and Juliet - 1936

Interior decoration (Black & white)

- When Ladies Meet - 1941
- Random Harvest - 1942
- Madame Curie - 1943
- The Picture of Dorian Gray - 1945

Interior decoration (Color)

- Thousands Cheer - 1943
- Kismet - 1944
- National Velvet - 1945

Art direction/Set decoration (Black & white)

- Madame Bovary - 1949
- The Red Danube - 1950
- Too Young to Kiss - 1951
- Executive Suite - 1954
- I'll Cry Tomorrow - 1955
- Blackboard Jungle - 1955

Art direction/Set decoration (Color)

- Annie Get Your Gun - 1950
- The Merry Widow - 1952
- Lili - 1953
- Young Bess -1953
- The Story of Three Loves - 1953
- Brigadoon - 1954
- Lust For Life - 1956

Art Direction/Set Decoration

- Les Girls - 1957
- Raintree County - 1957
