= Her Private Life =

1929 film

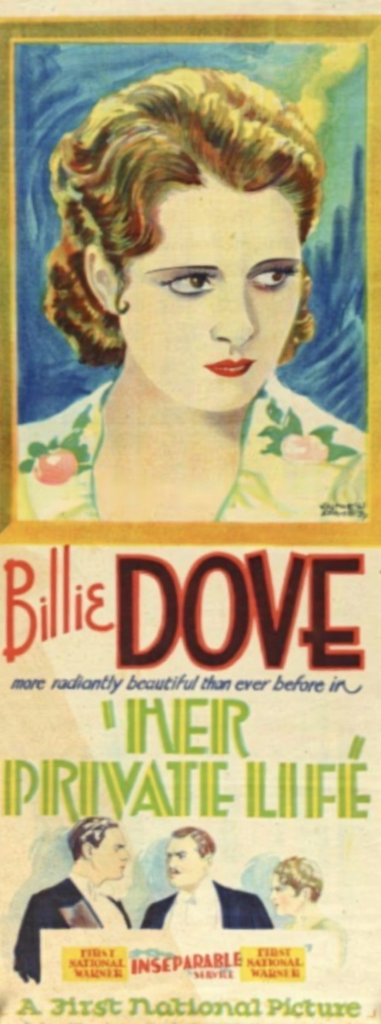
- Insert Card
- Directed by: Alexander Korda
- Screenplay by: Forrest Halsey
- Based on: Déclassée by Zoë Akins
- Produced by: Ned Marin
- Starring: Billie Dove; Walter Pidgeon; Holmes Herbert; Montagu Love
- Cinematography: John F. Seitz
- Edited by: Harold Young
- Music by: Cecil Copping; Alois Reiser
- Production company: First National Pictures
- Distributed by: Warner Bros. Pictures, Inc.
- Release date: August 25, 1929
- Running time: 80 minutes
- Country: United States
- Language: English

Her Private Life is a surviving 1929 American sound (All-Talking) pre-Code drama film directed by Alexander Korda and starring Billie Dove, Walter Pidgeon and Holmes Herbert. The plot concerns an English aristocrat who causes a scandal when she divorces her husband and runs off with a young American. The film had been considered a lost film. However, in July 2016, according to the Library of Congress, the film was found in an Italian archive.

This was Korda's second sound film, following The Squall. It is a remake of the 1925 silent film Déclassée by Robert G. Vignola, which was itself an adaptation of a 1919 play of the same name by Zoë Akins.

== Plot ==
Lady Helen Haden—descended from the aristocratic but notorious “Mad Varicks”—lives amid immense wealth and refinement at her country estate near London. Despite her beauty, status, and the admiration she inspires, she is profoundly unhappy. Her husband, Sir Bruce Haden—a coarse, jealous man of comparatively humble origins (a former butcher elevated to baronetcy)—subjects her to repeated humiliations fueled by drink, suspicion, and violent temper.

During a summer gathering at their estate, attended by numerous guests, Helen finds herself drawn to a young American visitor, Ned Thayer. Cultured, sincere, and gentle, Thayer represents everything her husband is not. Helen, emotionally starved yet governed by strict personal honor, feels an immediate and powerful attraction to him. Though she senses that happiness might lie with him, she refuses to betray her marriage, even at great personal cost. Her behavior becomes paradoxical—she is clearly drawn to Thayer, yet deliberately avoids him.

Thayer, confused by her contradictory conduct, cannot understand her restraint, while Sir Bruce watches the situation with mounting rage. His suspicions are not entirely unfounded, and his jealousy eventually erupts publicly during a card game involving Thayer and his sister, Mrs. Leslie. In a drunken outburst, Sir Bruce accuses Thayer of cheating and theft, humiliating him before the assembled guests. Helen intervenes indignantly, forcing her husband to apologize.

However, moments later Helen herself witnesses Mrs. Leslie cheating at cards—with Thayer apparently complicit. Shocked and disillusioned, she publicly denounces both Thayer and his sister as common thieves, creating an even greater scandal. In retaliation, Mrs. Leslie attempts to expose a compromising letter Helen had written to Thayer, urging him to leave the estate to avoid further temptation and scandal.

Rather than submit to blackmail, Helen seizes the letter and hands it to her husband herself, openly declaring her intention to leave him and seek a divorce. The resulting scandal destroys her social standing.

Accompanied only by her loyal maid, Helen departs England for New York, determined to begin anew. Cut off financially by Sir Bruce, she maintains an outward façade of elegance and luxury while secretly pawning the pearls from her treasured necklace one by one to survive. Alone in a vast and unfamiliar city, she faces quiet desperation without relinquishing her dignity.

In New York, she is reunited with a wealthy admirer, Rudolph Solomon—a millionaire art collector who had previously been her guest in England and had long loved her. He had even purchased from Sir Bruce a treasured ancestral portrait of Helen’s great-grandmother. Unknown to Helen, he discreetly monitors her situation and becomes aware of her financial hardship.

Under the pretense of a social gathering, he invites Helen to his lavish home, where she is greeted by familiar faces from her past. During a private moment, he reveals his love and presents her with the pearls she had been forced to sell—having secretly repurchased them—symbolically restoring what she has lost. He then asks her to marry him.

Helen, now destitute but still principled, makes a painful confession: she accepts his proposal not out of love, but out of necessity, admitting that her heart still belongs to another man—Ned Thayer—whom she believes to have betrayed her. Solomon, deeply in love yet honorable, accepts her honesty and offers her the necklace as an engagement gift.

Meanwhile, events begin to unravel the truth. Thayer, who has been away on a business trip to the tropics, reappears. In conversation with Solomon, he bitterly recounts the humiliation Helen inflicted upon him in England, while also revealing that his sister, now institutionalized due to her compulsive cheating, had long caused him trouble. It becomes clear that Thayer’s apparent dishonesty was in fact an attempt to shield his sister, even taking blame upon himself and allowing Helen to misunderstand him.

Realizing that Helen still loves Thayer and that Thayer is worthy of her, Solomon nobly sacrifices his own happiness. He breaks the engagement, returning Helen’s freedom with dignity and compassion.

Unaware at first of this resolution, Helen—overwhelmed by emotional turmoil, shame, and the reappearance of Thayer—panics and flees. In a moment of despair and confusion, she attempts suicide by throwing herself in front of an oncoming car just outside Solomon’s residence.

She is rushed back inside, where a doctor determines that, despite the violence of the impact, she has not been fatally injured. As she regains consciousness, she finds Thayer at her side. The truth is finally revealed: his supposed betrayal had been an act of self-sacrifice, motivated by loyalty to his troubled sister.

With misunderstandings resolved, Helen recognizes the depth of Thayer’s integrity and love. Solomon, completing his act of renunciation, quietly withdraws, entrusting her future to the man she truly loves.

In an emotional reconciliation, Helen and Thayer are united at last. Freed from her oppressive marriage, restored in spirit, and finally able to embrace love without compromise, Helen finds the happiness that had long eluded her.

== Cast ==
- Billie Dove as Lady Helen Haden
- Walter Pidgeon as Ned Thayer
- Holmes Herbert as Rudolph Solomon
- Montagu Love as Sir Bruce Haden
- Thelma Todd as Mrs. Leslie
- Roland Young as Charteris
- Mary Forbes as Lady Wildering
- Brandon Hurst as Sir Emmett Wildering
- ZaSu Pitts as Timmins

== Music ==
The song features a theme song entitled "Love Is Like A Rose" which was composed by Al Bryan and George W. Meyer. Walter Pidgeon sings this song in the film. The song is also played instrumentally as background music by the Vitaphone orchestra several times throughout the film.

== See also ==
- List of early sound feature films (1926–1929)
- List of early Warner Bros. sound and talking features

== Bibliography ==
- Kulik, Karol. Alexander Korda: The Man Who Could Work Miracles. Virgin Books, 1990.
