= Verna Willis =

American film editor

- Born: April 2, 1887; Illinois, USA
- Died: December 11, 1966 (aged 79); Los Angeles, California, USA
- Occupation: Film editor
- Spouses: Laurence Lindon (divorced) Charles P. Boyle (divorced)
- Children: 2, including Lionel Lindon
- Relatives: Edwin B. Willis (brother)

Verna Willis was an American film editor known for her work on films of the late 1920s during Hollywood's silent era. She was employed by Paramount and was highly regarded for her skill as a cutter.

== Biography ==
=== Beginnings ===
Verna was born in Ivesdale, Illinois, to Edgar Willis and Carolyn Anderson in 1887. Her younger brother, Edwin B. Willis, later became an Academy Award–winning set designer and decorator for MGM Studios.

=== Hollywood career ===
By the time she reached adulthood, she had moved to San Francisco, where she worked as a telephone operator. Eventually, she moved to Los Angeles and found employment as a stenographer at Paramount. When a spot opened up in the studio's scenario department, she jumped at the opportunity, working as a script girl before ultimately finding her way into an editing job. She ended up editing over a dozen films between 1926 and 1930 before seemingly retiring from the business.

=== Personal life ===
Verna was married twice: first to Laurence Lindon, with whom she had two children Ouida and Lionel. Ouida studied design in Paris, and later opened a millinery shop in Beverly Hills, and Lionel became a Cinematographer. Verna's second marriage was to cameraman Charles P. Boyle. Both marriages ended in divorce.

== Selected filmography ==
- Il Richiamo del Cuore (1930)
- The Santa Fe Trail (1930)
- The Texan (1930)
- Men Are Like That (1930)
- Sarah and Son (1930)
- Sweetie (1929)
- Charming Sinners (1929)
- The Greene Murder Case (1929)]
- His Private Life (1928)
- Varsity (1928)
- Half a Bride (1928)
- Something Always Happens (1928)
- Love and Learn (1928)
- Time to Love (1927)
