= Old maid's pink =

Old maid's pink is a common name for several plants and may refer to:

- Agrostemma
- Saponaria officinalis
Plants called old maid's pink
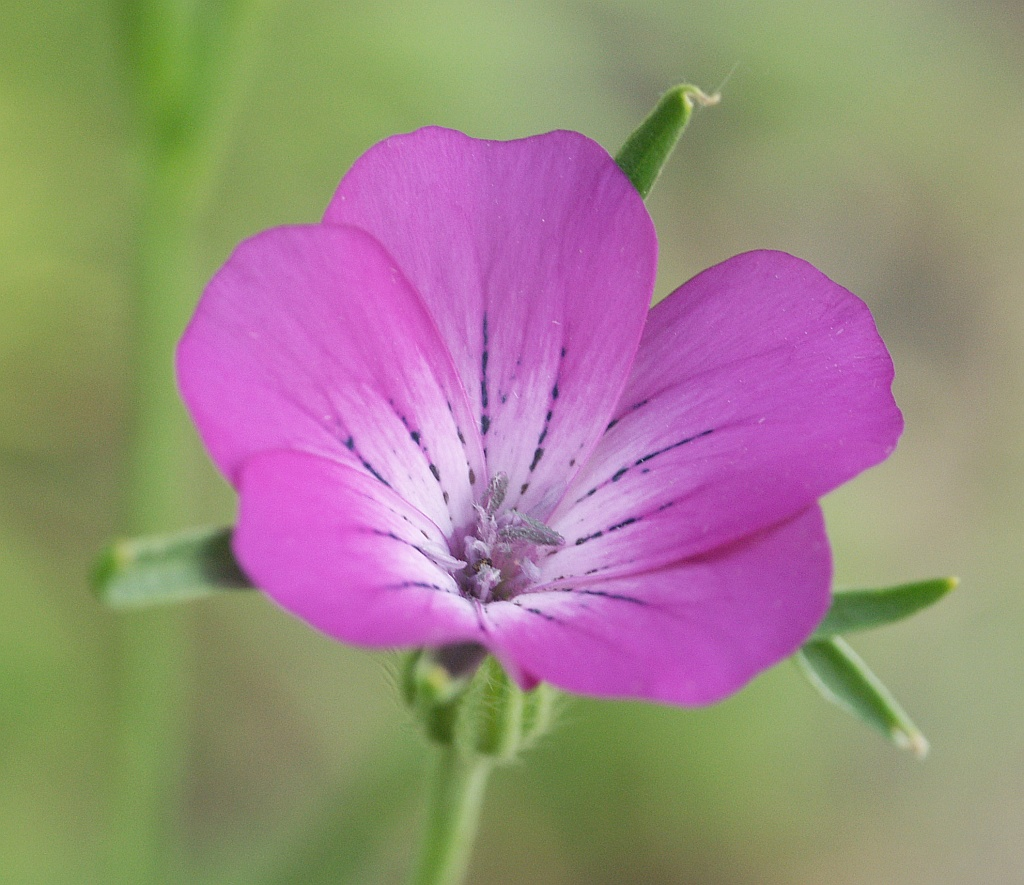
Flower of Agrostemma githago

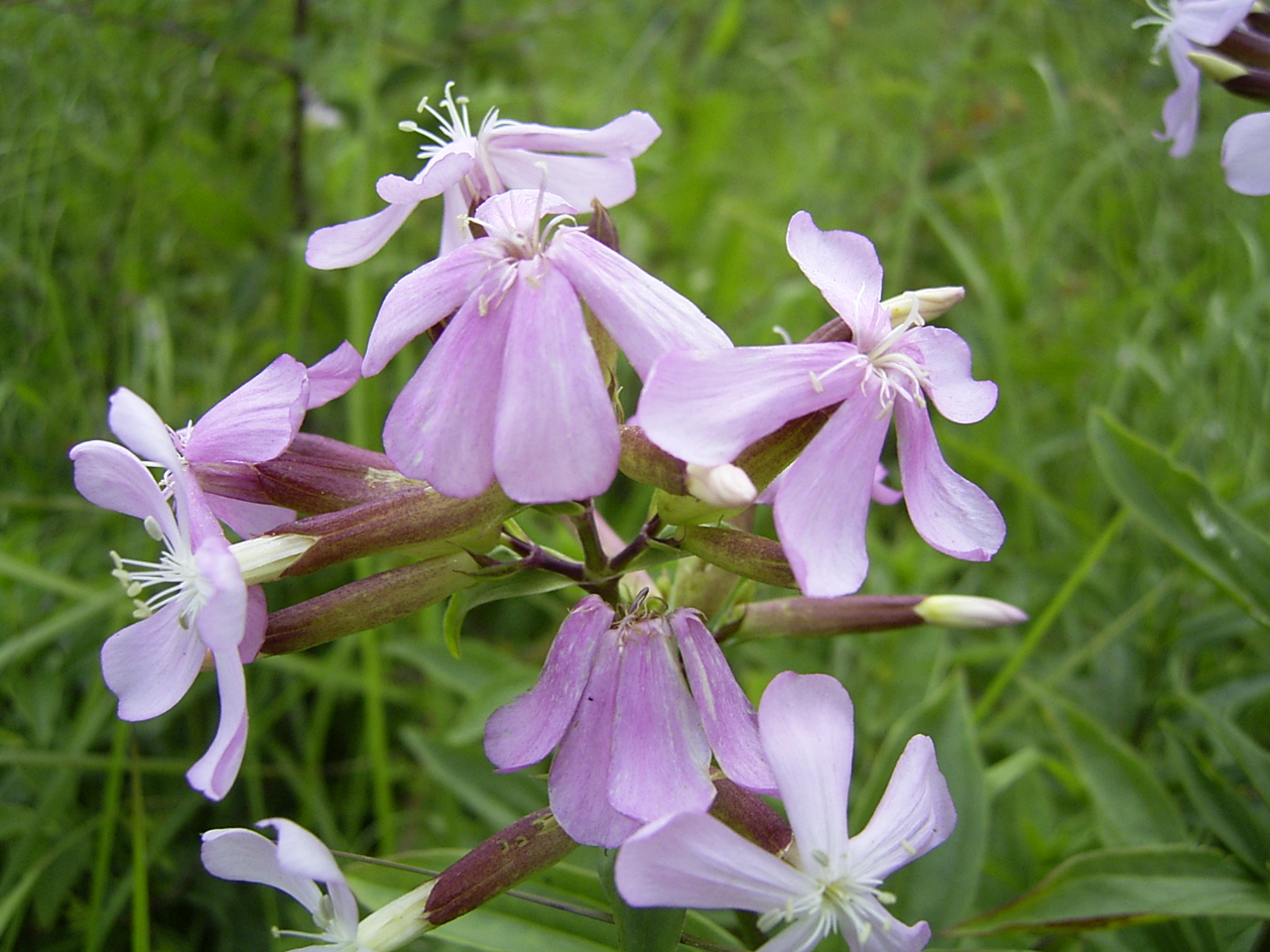
Flowers of Saponaria officinalis
