= Love and Learn (1928 film) =

1928 film

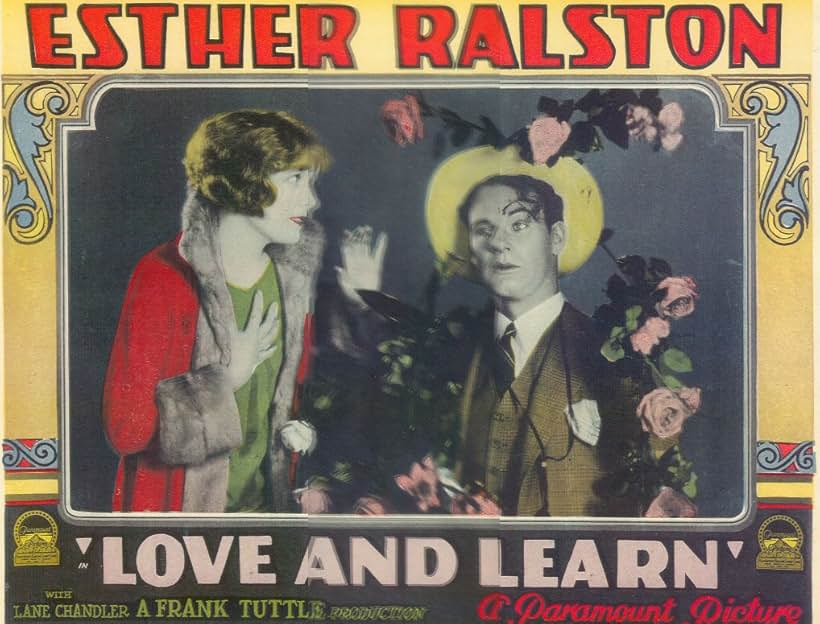
- Directed by: Frank Tuttle
- Written by: Florence Ryerson (adaptation); Louise Long (scenario); Herman J. Mankiewicz (titles)
- Based on: story by Doris Anderson
- Produced by: Adolph Zukor; Jesse Lasky
- Starring: Esther Ralston
- Cinematography: Harry Fischbeck
- Edited by: Verna Willis
- Distributed by: Paramount Pictures
- Release date: January 14, 1928
- Running time: 6 reels
- Country: United States
- Language: Silent (English intertitles)

Love and Learn is a lost 1928 American silent comedy film directed by Frank Tuttle and starring Esther Ralston. Famous Players–Lasky produced the picture and released through Paramount Pictures.

== Cast ==
- Esther Ralston as Nancy Blair
- Lane Chandler as Anthony Cowles
- Hedda Hopper as Mrs. Ann Blair
- Claude King as Robert Blair
- Jack J. Clark as Hansen (credited as John J. Clark)
- Jack Trent as Jim Riley
- Hal Craig as Sgt. Flynn
- Helen Lynch as Rosie
- Catherine Parrish as Jail Matron
- Martha Franklin as Martha
- Jerry Mandy as Gardener
- Dorothea Wolbert as Maid
- Johnnie Morris as Bum (credited as Johnny Morris)
- Guy Oliver as Detective
