= The Old Maid (play) =

1935 play adapted by Zoë Akins from Edith Wharton's 1924 novella

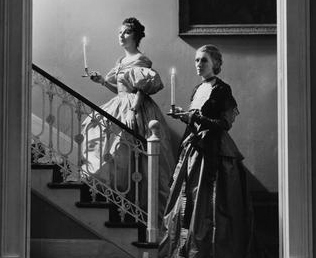
- Original language: English
- Written by: Zoë Akins
- Based on: The Old Maid by Edith Wharton
- Subject: Strife between cousins
- Genre: Drama
- Setting: Delia Lovell's room, 1833; A day-nursery, 1839; The Ralston drawing room, 1839,1853,1854

Premiere
- Date: January 7, 1935
- Place: Empire Theatre
- Directed by: Guthrie McClintic

The Old Maid is a 1934 play by American playwright Zoë Akins, adapted from Edith Wharton's 1924 novella of the same name. The play as published has six "episodes", (Note: Program notes of the time and contemporary newspaper reviews give a more conventional organization of three acts and six scenes.) covering twenty-one years of time. It has a large cast, and three settings; one is used for the last four episodes (scenes). The story concerns two women, cousins, who allow rancor over a lost love to become a struggle for the illegitimate daughter of one.

The original production was produced by Harry Moses, staged by Guthrie McClintic, had sets and costumes by Stewart Chaney, and starred Judith Anderson and Helen Menken. It played on Broadway from January through September 1935, then went on tour for seven months. Despite reviews that ranged from mild praise to negative at its inception, the play was awarded the 1935 Pulitzer Prize for Drama, a decision marked by controversy over the snubbing of Lillian Hellman's The Children's Hour. It has never had a revival on Broadway. It was adapted for a motion picture under the same name in 1939.

== Characters ==
Leads

- Delia Lovell is an attractive stylish woman who marries James Ralston for comfort, not love.
- Charlotte Lovell called "Chatty", is Delia's plain cousin, who secretly had Clement Spender's daughter.

Supporting

- Dr. Lanskell is a kindly old family physician, who knows Charlotte's secret.
- Mrs. Mingott is the tart-tongued aunt to James and Joseph Ralston, who is visiting from Paris.
- James Ralston is the wealthy man Delia marries at the end of the first scene.
- Joseph Ralston is the brother of James, and the fiancée of Charlotte.
- Delia Halsey known as "Dee", is Delia's twenty-year-old married natural daughter.
- John Halsey is Dee's husband and Delia's son-in-law.
- Lanning Halsey is a cousin of John Halsey, and love interest for the adult Tina.
- Tina is the 19-year-old daughter of Charlotte; she knows her real mother only as an old maid.

Featured

- Nora is Delia's maid in the first scene.
- Bridget is an Irish servant who works at the day-nursery.
- Mrs. Jennie Meade is the working mother of an infant boy who is cared for at the day-nursery.
- Clementina is Tina at age five, when she was living with Cyrus and Jessamine while attending the day-nursery.
- Benny, Tommy, and Susan are poor children attending the day-nursery who taunt Clementina.
- Servant is a woman with a shawl, who appears at the end of Act I Scene 2 to announce the dressmakers.

Off stage

- Clement Spender is an artist, whom Delia once pledged to marry, but whom she forsook for a comfortable life.
- Mrs. Lovell is Charlotte's grandmother, with whom she lives and above whose stables she has her day-nursery.
- Jessamine is the Negro former nursemaid to Charlotte; at the play's beginning she cares for Clementina.
- Cyrus is a Negro handyman, husband to Jessamine, who "found" the abandoned baby girl Clementina.

== Synopsis ==
The play as published has a program facsimile from the premiere that shows a different timeline from later programs, though the time intervals between scenes are the same. This article follows the timeline as shown in the published play, but uses conventional acts and scenes in place of episodes.

Act I The play opens in 1833, with Delia in her room at her parents' home in New York City, just before her wedding to Jim Ralston. Charlotte brings her a gift from Clem Spender, who has returned from Italy for the wedding. Chatty chides Delia for not having waited longer for Clem, who still loves her. Delia asks Chatty to take care of Clem at the wedding reception.

The second scene opens in 1839 at the day-nursery. Some poorly dressed children are taunting Clementina for living with a Negro family. (Note: The published play had them using a racial pejorative; no contemporary reviewer of the play mentions this, so it is not known whether the original production used it.) Charlotte stops them and sends them home. Bridget takes Tina away for her supper, while Charlotte offers Jennie Meade work in the day-nursery since she has been dismissed from her position. Dr. Lanskell arrives, bringing Mrs. Mingott, just arrived from Paris. Delia, James, and Joseph arrive as well. Mrs. Mingott asks to see Charlotte's waifs, but only Tina remains. Tina is shy, responding only to Delia, which alarms Charlotte. After the others leave, Joseph tries to persuade Charlotte to leave running the day-nursery to someone else. He is afraid for her health, remembering she spent a year in the South to recoup from illness.

Act II Later that same evening in the drawing room at Delia Ralston's home, Charlotte tells Delia the wedding is off because Joseph wants to separate her from the day-nursery. She confesses that Clementina is her own daughter. Delia is sympathetic until she learns that Clem Spender is the father. Charlotte pleads for her help, but Delia says she will do what she thinks best. She sends Charlotte away, then joins Dr. Lanskell, Mrs. Mingott, James, and Joseph. She tells them that Charlotte cannot marry Joseph because her illness has returned. Joseph is distraught, but James persuades him it is for the best. When the others leave, Dr. Lanskell confronts Delia with her lie. She says she'll adopt Tina, but the doctor persuades her not to separate Charlotte and Tina. Instead, Delia will convince her husband to buy a house for Chatty and Tina to live together.

Act III The first scene occurs in 1853, again at the Ralston drawing-room. James Ralston died twelve years previously, so Charlotte and Tina now live with Delia, whose own daughter Dee is married to John Halsey. Delia, Dee, Tina, John, and Lanning Halsey are singing in the parlor (off-stage). Dr. Lanskell sits with Charlotte, who complains Delia is spoiling Tina. Tina still has no idea that Charlotte is her real mother, which is how Charlotte wants it. When the others join them in the drawing-room (on stage), Charlotte scolds Tina for being late to a party, but Tina and Lanning poke fun at her severity. The second scene opens later that evening, with just Delia and Charlotte. Charlotte confronts her cousin over the romance between Tina and Lanning, which Delia is encouraging. The two women argue forcefully over the past and what's best for Tina. Delia finally begins to comprehend Charlotte's true concern for her daughter.

The final scene occurs in June 1854, the night before Tina's marriage to Lanning Halsey. Delia tells Tina, that after the ceremony, be sure to kiss Charlotte the last of all, before she enters the carriage to depart for her honeymoon. Tina is startled at the request; she seems to be wondering about her old maid Aunt Chatty. But she promises Delia to do so as the play ends.

== Differences from novella ==
Wharton's novella began in 1840, with Delia already married, the mother of two children, and Charlotte's impending wedding to Joseph Ralston a week away. The novella is written from Delia's viewpoint; her thoughts and inner emotions are revealed to the reader. The play however, leans towards Charlotte in stage presence. In the novella, Joseph and James Ralston were second cousins, not brothers. Delia's son is not mentioned in the play. Mrs. Mingott was mentioned a few times in the novella, but was not present in the action. The novella has no scenes of other children taunting Clementina in the day-nursery. The characters of Nora, Jennie Meade, and the day-nursery children were created for the play.

== Original production ==
=== Background ===
Zoë Akins adapted the play from Edith Wharton's 1924 novella during 1934; it was copyright that year to both women. There is no public record of Edith Wharton commenting on Akins' adaption of her novella.

By October 17, 1934, producer Harry Moses had acquired the play and had signed Helen Menken for one of the leads. By the end of November 1934 Judith Anderson and director Guthrie McClintic had been signed, with the opening scheduled for the Empire Theatre on New Year's Eve. However, a week later that premiere date had slipped to January 7, 1935.

Stewart Chaney had been hired to design sets and costumes for the production by December 17, 1934. Many of the supporting and featured cast were still being engaged at the same time.

=== Cast ===
Principal cast for the Baltimore tryout and during the original Broadway run.
Role	Actor	Dates	Notes and sources
Delia Lovell	Judith Anderson	Dec 31, 1934 - Sep 14, 1935	
Delia Lovell	Jessie Royce Landis	Sep 16, 1935 - Sep 27, 1935	Landis took over the role so Anderson could have a vacation before starting the long tour.
Delia Lovell	Judith Anderson	Sep 28, 1935 - Sep 28, 1935	Anderson returned for the final matinee and evening performances on this date.
Charlotte Lovell	Helen Menken	Dec 31, 1934 - Sep 28, 1935	
Dr. Lanskell	George Nash	Dec 31, 1934 - Sep 28, 1935	
Mrs. Mingott	Margaret Dale	Dec 31, 1934 - Sep 28, 1935	
Joseph Ralston	Robert Wallsten	Dec 31, 1934 - Aug 03, 1935	Wallsten left for a principal part in a tryout for The People.
Joseph Ralston	Robert Lowes	Aug 05, 1935 - Sep 28, 1935	
James Ralston	Frederic Voight	Dec 31, 1934 - Sep 28, 1935	
Delia Halsey	Florence Williams	Dec 31, 1934 - Sep 28, 1935	
John Halsey	Warren Trent	Dec 31, 1934 - Sep 28, 1935	
Lanning Halsey	John Cromwell	Dec 31, 1934 - Sep 28, 1935	
Tina	Margaret Anderson	Dec 31, 1934 - Jun 01, 1935	
Tina	Marjorie Lord	Jun 03, 1935 - Sep 28, 1935	
Nora	Dona Earl	Dec 31, 1934 - Sep 28, 1935	
Jennie Meade	Mary Ricard	Dec 31, 1934 - Sep 28, 1935	
Bridget	Hope Landin	Dec 31, 1934 - Sep 28, 1935	
Clementina	Yvonne Mann	Dec 31, 1934 - Sep 28, 1935	Her character was five, but Yvonne was age 7 during the Broadway run.
Susan	Gloria Mann	Dec 31, 1934 - Sep 28, 1935	Gloria at age 8 was Yvonne's older sister. Both girls were commercial models and singers.
Tommy	Jackie Grimes	Dec 31, 1934 - Sep 28, 1935	Jackie was age 9, and had no prior performing experience.
Benny	Charles Wiley Jr	Dec 31, 1934 - Sep 28, 1935	Charles was age 7 during this run, but already a veteran of vaudeville, film, and radio.
Servant	Gail Reade	Dec 31, 1934 - Sep 28, 1935	

=== Tryout ===
The play's first performance was on December 31, 1934, at the Maryland Theatre in Baltimore. It was an inauspicious date for this work's opening, for "It clashed with the holiday mood of the audience" according to reviewer Donald Kirkley. He explained why: "...there is scarcely a spark of humor in the whole piece; its moods are mostly dark, sour, bitter". Kirkely also thought the stars' acting uneven, but even worse that the authors failed to make Charlotte's troubles seem important. Gilbert Kanour from The Evening Sun said Akins' adaption from Wharton's The Old Maid had "literate dignity" but "the drama she tried to ignite from those pages merely spluttered and refused to burn". "The story seemed impotent and lacked theatrical warmth" he continued, and like Kirkley, remarked on the dampened spirit of the holiday crowd. Kanour also delivered a low blow: "The costars were handicapped in the beginning as are all mature actresses who try to take the parts of young women".

A journalist for a Baltimore newspaper reported Judith Anderson arriving for an interview "waving a script" and saying "New scene for tonight". The exact date of this script addition and its content were not reported, but the interview was published in an evening newspaper on the last day of the Baltimore tryout.

=== Premiere and reception ===
The Old Maid premiered on January 7, 1935, at the Empire Theatre. However, this was also the premiere for another major play, The Petrified Forest. To ensure his production got media attention, producer Harry Moses invited the New York critics down to Baltimore to view The Old Maid on January 5, 1938, at the end of its one-week tryout there. The critics held their reviews until January 8, 1935, when they normally would have appeared and were candid about the performance date and location they attended.

Brooks Atkinson praised Judith Anderson's performance and Stewart Chaney's sets, but little else about the production. He was severe with Helen Menken's interpretation of the spinster, and damned Guthrie McClintic's direction by saying "on the surface... it was soothing to the eye". He concluded with "The Old Maid ought to be a masterpiece. This reviewer cannot pretend to know exactly why it is a good deal less than that. Probably neither the play not the performance is wholly blameless". Burns Mantle was more in sympathy with the play; revealing he saw it at a Saturday matinee in Baltimore, he pointed out that "the audience was as heavily feminine as the play and the response was perfect." He had high praise for the virtuosity of both leads: "Playing together their timing of scenes, their delicate treatment of what might be easily slurred into the common hokum of the sentimental drama, their intelligent respect for each other and each other's talent, gives a finer balance to the play than co-stars usually contribute."

Arthur Pollock had a more nuanced appreciation for Zoë Akins' adaption. He felt she had been too respectful of Edith Wharton's phrasing, that the play would have been stronger if she had been more willing to tear down and rebuild: "But, so considerate has Zoe Akins been of Edith Wharton and her novel that, in order to let nothing of the original author disappear, she permits her play to be stiff and, in its mechanics, old-fashioned." Pollock had high praise for both stars, saying of Anderson and Menken they "play with a rare sensitiveness and tender dexterity", but concluded "It is very beautiful, but I couldn't think of its people as anything but dainty puppets".

=== Awards and controversy ===
During April 1935 The Theatre Club, Inc. (Note: The club was a women's social organization comprising several hundred members in New York City. It purchased large blocks of tickets for weekday matinees at a discount for its members.) awarded its annual gold medal for Best Play to The Old Maid. The club's members voted on the award, as they had been doing since 1925–1926, and by "an overwhelming majority" the Akins play won.

There was near unanimity among drama critics that the best play of the season was The Children's Hour by Lillian Hellman, but there was also widespread feeling it would be blocked from the award by either the Pulitzer committee itself or the Trustees that oversaw the awards. What was not expected at first was that the play chosen would be The Old Maid. In early April Sam Zolotow of The New York Times had estimated odds for each of the top plays that might be under consideration for the award. He placed The Old Maid at tenth on a list of eleven, with 40 to 1 odds. However, by early May the consensus had swung to The Old Maid, in expectation that The Children's Hour would be nobbled, and because of the Gold Medal awarded by The Theatre Club.

The decision was announced at an evening banquet on May 6, 1935. The Brooklyn Daily Eagle reported that when word reached the Empire Theatre "The Misses Menken and Anderson went into a little dance of jubilation in the wings". It also sparked immediate protest. Former Pulitzer Jury member Clayton Hamilton was quoted in the Daily News as having told the Associated Press:

"The characters were created by Miss Wharton; the atmosphere was created by Miss Wharton; and the emotions and sentiments were worked out by Miss Wharton. They neglected to observe the finest American play of this year, The Children's Hour."

Akins' reply to Hamilton, according to The New York Times, was to remind him he had voted for Marc Connelly's The Green Pastures, a 1930 adaption of Ol' Man Adam an' His Chillun by Roark Bradford. The New York Times offered a detailed explanation of how the Pulitzer voting had gone, saying that The Children's Hour was considered, but lost out for having a "poor conclusion" (third act). It also said the Pulitzer jury (John Erskine, William Lyon Phelps, and Stark Young) had recommended four plays to the Columbia University trustees: The Old Maid, Valley Forge, Merrily We Roll Along, and Personal Appearance.

=== Closing and tour ===
The play closed at the Empire Theatre on September 28, 1935. It then started touring at Philadelphia on September 30, 1935, and finished up at Wilmington, Delaware on April 29, 1936.

== Adaptations ==
=== Film ===
The New York Times reported on July 23, 1935, that the film rights to The Old Maid had been sold for $40,000 to Paramount, with the stipulation the film could not be released until after the original production's tour had finished. However, it would be three years after the tour ended before Warner Brothers, rather than Paramount, released the film, starring Bette Davis as Charlotte and Miriam Hopkins as Delia.
