= Déclassée =

1925 film

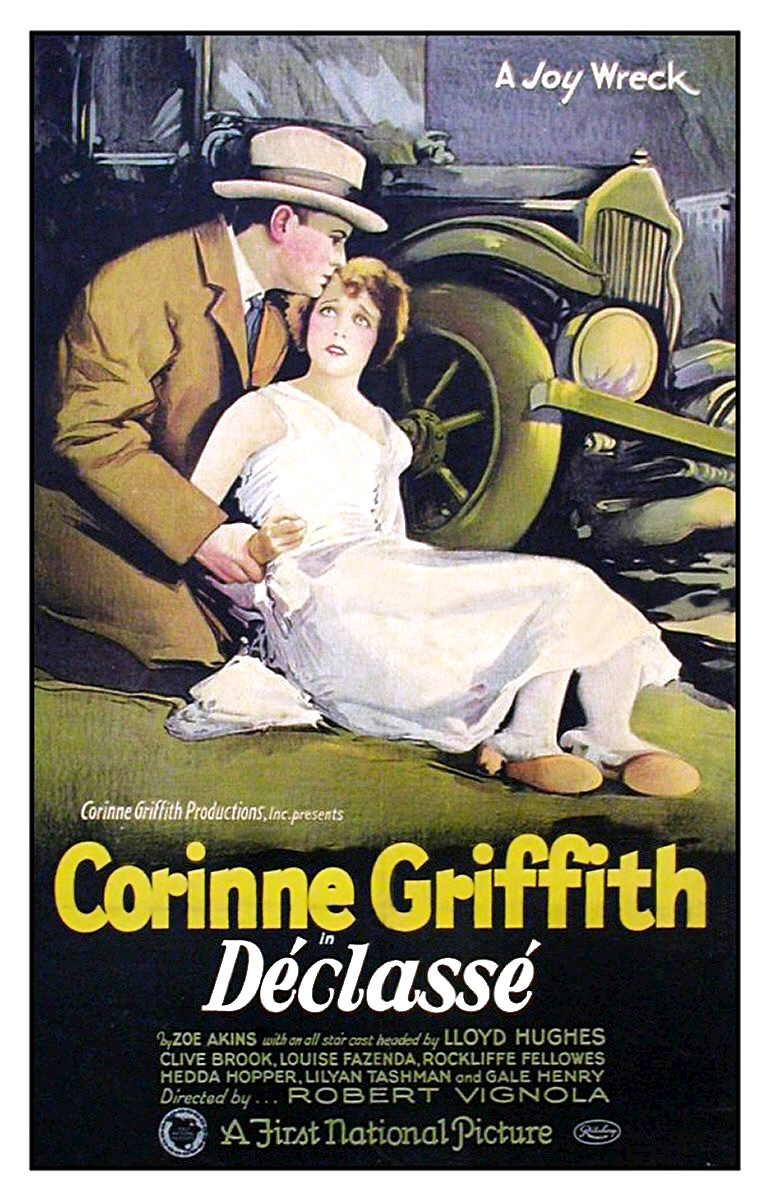
- Film poster
- Directed by: Robert G. Vignola
- Written by: Bradley King; Charles E. Whittaker
- Based on: Déclassée by Zoë Akins
- Produced by: Corinne Griffith; First National
- Starring: Corinne Griffith
- Cinematography: Tony Gaudio
- Edited by: Cyril Gardner
- Music by: Leo Fall
- Distributed by: First National Pictures
- Release date: April 12, 1925 (United States)
- Running time: 80 minutes
- Country: United States
- Language: Silent (English intertitles)

Déclassée, listed as Déclassé on some posters, is a 1925 American silent drama film of manners produced and released by First National Pictures in association with Corinne Griffith as executive producer. Griffith also stars in the production which was directed by Robert G. Vignola and based on the 1919 play of the same name by Zoë Akins that starred Ethel Barrymore.

A young and unknown Clark Gable made an uncredited appearance.

The film was remade as an early talkie in 1929 titled Her Private Life starring Billie Dove.

== Plot ==
As described in a film magazine review, Lady Helen, married to Sir Bruce, finds in Ned Thayer's companionship the one spark of joy in her life. Ned is forced by his sister-in-law to help her cheat at cards, under the threat to show Sir Bruce a letter in which Lady Helen avows her love for Ned. Lady Helen sees the card cheating and forces Ned to apologize to Sir Bruce. The letter is then given to Sir Bruce, who divorces his wife. Through the resulting scandal, Helen becomes déclassé in London society, and drifts to New York City, where the wealthy Rudolph Solomon pursues her to become his mistress. When she is about to succumb, being at the end of her resources, at the last moment she throws herself under an automobile. Ned Thayer, having returned, rescues her and the promise of their union finally comes true.

== Cast ==
- Corinne Griffith as Lady Helen Haden
- Lloyd Hughes as Ned Thayer
- Clive Brook as Rudolph Solomon
- Rockliffe Fellowes as Sir Bruce Haden
- Lilyan Tashman as Mrs. Leslie
- Hedda Hopper as Lady Wildering
- Bertram Johns as Sir Emmett Wildering
- Gale Henry as Timmins
- Louise Fazenda as Mrs. Walton
- Eddie Lyons as Mr. Walton
- Mario Carillo as Hotel Manager
- Paul Weigel as Henri
- Clark Gable as Extra (uncredited)

== Preservation ==
A print of this film resides in the British Film Institute National Archive with a trailer surviving at the Library of Congress.
