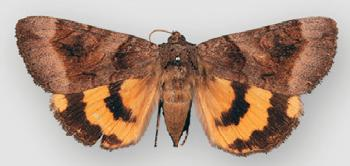
- Lectotype of Catocala badia var. phoebe. now considered a synonym of Catocala badia

Scientific classification
- Kingdom: Animalia
- Phylum: Arthropoda
- Class: Insecta
- Order: Lepidoptera
- Superfamily: Noctuoidea
- Family: Erebidae
- Genus: Catocala
- Species: C. badia

Binomial name
- Catocala badia Grote & Robinson, 1866

Synonyms
- Catocala coelebs Grote, 1874; Catocala phoebe Edwards, 1884; Catabapta badia; Catabapta coelebs

= Catocala badia =

Species of moth

Catocala badia, the bay underwing, bayberry underwing or old maid, is a moth of the family Erebidae. It is found from southern Maine and New Hampshire south to New York and Connecticut.

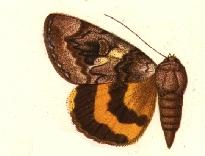
Catocala badia coelebs illustration

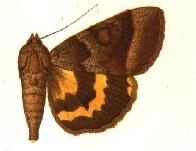
Catocala badia badia illustration

The wingspan is 50–60 mm. There is probably one generation per year. The badia subspecies is listed as a species of special concern in Connecticut.

The larvae feed on Comptonia peregrina, Myrica cerifera, Myrica gale, and Myrica pensylvanica.

== Subspecies ==
- Catocala badia badia
- Catocala badia coelebs Grote, 1874 (Ontario and New Hampshire)
