= Helen Menken =

American actress (1901–1966)

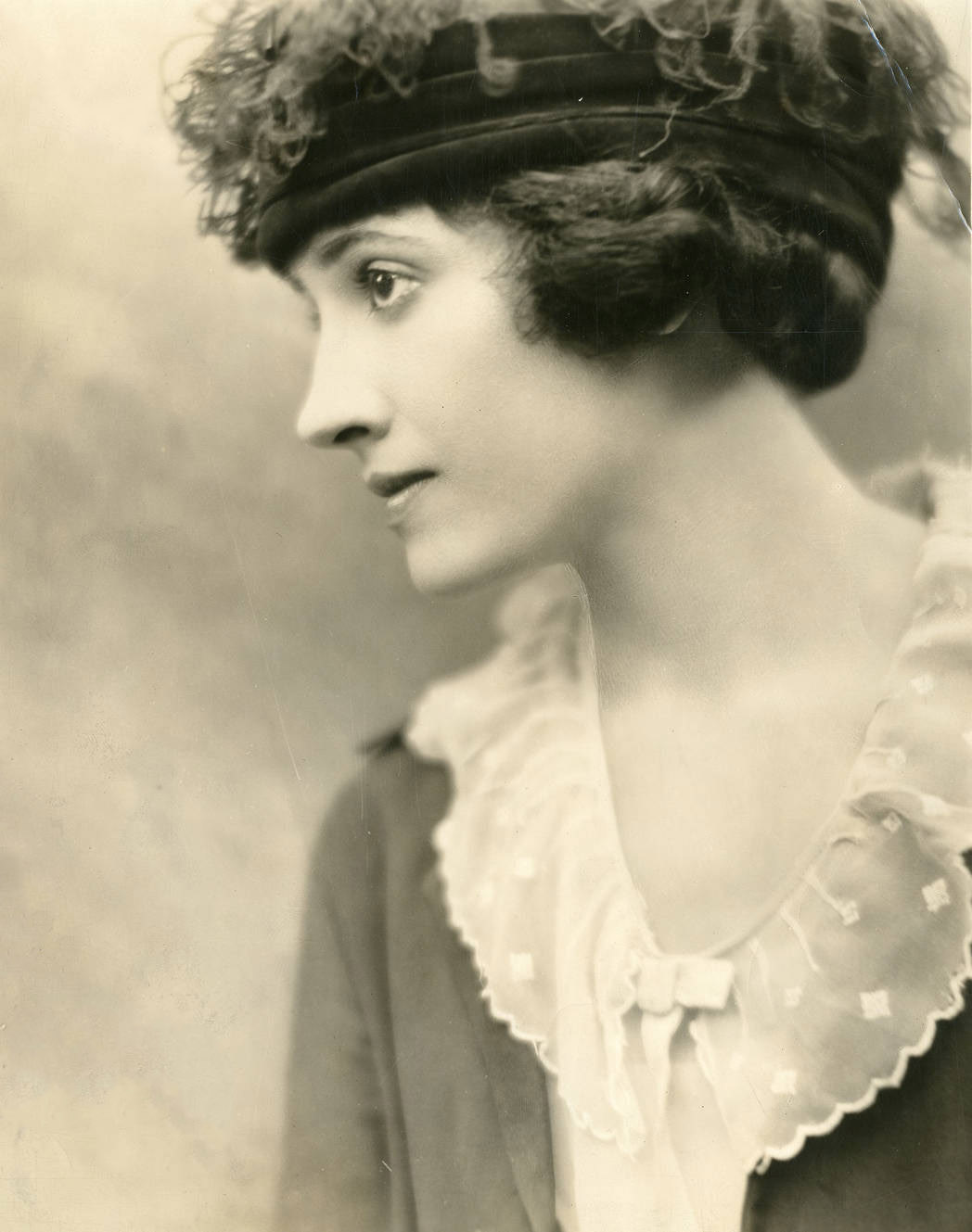
- Menken in 1920
- Born: Helen Meinken; December 12, 1901; New York City, U.S.
- Died: March 27, 1966 (aged 64); New York City, U.S.
- Occupation: Actress
- Years active: 1915–1963
- Spouses: Humphrey Bogart (m. 1926; div. 1927) Henry T. Smith (m. 1932; div. 1947) George N. Richard (m. 1948)

Helen Menken (née Meinken; December 12, 1901 – March 27, 1966) was an American stage actress.

== Early years ==
Menken was born in New York City to a German-French father, Frederick Meinken, and an Irish-born mother, Mary Madden. Both of her parents were deaf, and her early communication came via sign language. She did not begin speaking aloud until age 4. Her sister, Grace Menken, was also an actress. At age 12, she was sent to a school in Brighton, England.

== Stage ==
Before she turned 14, Menken performed in vaudeville for a season, primarily playing character parts with her brother-in-law. A dispute when the troupe was in Dallas led to her walking out and joining a Shakespearean company that was also in Dallas.

Billed as Helen Meinken, Menken acted in 1915 in Brooklyn and in 1916 with the Orpheum Players in Reading, Pennsylvania. She made her Broadway theatre debut as a teenage actress in Parlor, Bedroom and Bath (1917). Her first major Broadway role was as the female lead in Three Wise Fools (1918). Her greatest stage triumphs were Seventh Heaven in 1922–1924 (Janet Gaynor played her role of Diane in the 1927 film version); Mary of Scotland in 1933–1934 as Elizabeth I opposite Helen Hayes in the title role (Katharine Hepburn played Mary in the 1936 film version); and The Old Maid, the Pulitzer Prize-winning play that starred Menken and Judith Anderson in 1935. Bette Davis would play Menken's role as the spinster with a secret in the 1939 film version. Menken's final Broadway appearance was in an unsuccessful play named The Laughing Woman, which ran for less than a month in 1937.

Menken appeared as the leading lady for the summer stock cast at the Elitch Theatre, in Denver, Colorado, in 1922 and 1924. For the 1924 summer season she appeared in the role of Cassie Cook, a role she originated on Broadway, in the play Drifting. After having appeared in Denver during the summer of 1922, the theatre critic from The Denver Post stated: "We who have watched her for a summer at the Gardens have thought we knew all about her acting, but Sunday night she turned loose things that are beyond anything she ever showed before and much that was superior to her best work in the plays two years ago."

Her performance as Irene De Montcel, in the first English-language production of The Captive, Edouard Bourdet's lesbian-themed drama, led to her arrest (along with the rest of the cast) on February 9, 1927. Menken was charged with “contributing to a common nuisance “and “obscene exhibition.” This arrest, reflecting 1920s attitudes about homosexuality, contributed to her lack of a film career and possibly to her divorce from Bogart.

Menken was a major presence behind the scenes in the theater world, especially at the American Theatre Wing. She served as its chairman during World War II and began serving as president of the group in 1957.

== Radio ==
Menken was active on radio in the 1940s (starring as Brenda Cummings in Second Husband and notably recreating her performance opposite Judith Anderson in a 1946 radio adaption of The Old Maid).

== Film ==
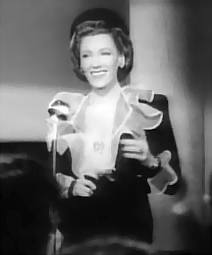
Menken in Stage Door Canteen (1943)

Menken made a short film in New York City in 1925 for Lee DeForest, filmed in the short-lived DeForest Phonofilm sound-on-film process. The film is preserved in the Maurice Zouary collection at the Library of Congress.

== Recognition ==
Menken received a Special Tony Award posthumously in 1966 "for a lifetime of devotion and dedicated service to the Broadway theatre."

== Personal life ==
The first of her husbands was actor Humphrey Bogart. She was Bogart's first wife. They were married at the Gramercy Park Hotel in New York City on May 20, 1926, and she divorced him November 18, 1927. She married Dr. Henry T. Smith on July 12, 1932, and divorced him in 1947, then in October 1948 married George N. Richard who survived her. She had no children from these marriages.

== Death ==
Menken died of a heart attack at a party at The Lambs on March 27, 1966, at the age of 64.
