= Schrum-Schrum =

- Alternative name: Alte Jungfer
- Type: Shedding
- Players: 2 or 4
- Skills: Observation, number sequences, sneak
- Age range: 6+
- Deck: Skat pack
- Play: Clockwise
- Playing time: 20-30 minutes
- Chance: Easy

Schrum-Schrum or Alte Jungfer ("Old Maid" (Note: Not to be confused with Old Maid, the English card game.)) is a simple, domino-like, card game from Germany which is suitable for children.

== Rules ==
The following rules are based on Feder.

=== Cards ===
Schrum-Schrum may be played with a Piquet or Skat pack of 32 cards ranking, from highest to lowest: King, Queen, Jack, Ten, Nine Eight, Seven, Ace.

=== Aim ===
To be the first to shed all one's cards.

=== Play ===
The cards are shuffled well and fully dealt. Players do not look at their cards but place them face down in front of them as an individual talon. Forehand leads and turns his topmost card. If it is an Ace it is played to the centre of the table. Any other card is placed face up beside his talon in a reserve, the top card of which is always available. The next player in clockwise order either builds a Seven of any suit onto the Ace if he has one or, if not, starts his reserve pile. Cards are built on the Ace in ascending sequence to the King, their suit being irrelevant. Every time a player is able to add to the sequence, he may turn another card and keep going. As a sneaky alternative to placing a card on the reserve, players may also place it on an opponent's reserve if it matches in rank (variation: if it is the next in sequence). If he does so, he may turn the next card of his talon and play that. Once a player's talon is exhausted, he turns his reserve and re-uses it.

=== Winning ===
The first player to shed all his cards is the winner.

== Alte Jungfer ==
Gööck and Müller describe a similar game for 3 or more players called Alte Jungfer ("Old Maid" - not to be confused with the English game of Old Maid) using a 52-card pack. After shuffling and cutting the dealer distributes all the cards, it being irrelevant if some players have an extra one. The mode of play is similar to Schrum-Schrum: the first player with an Ace plays it to the table; otherwise cards are placed in the player's reserve pile. However the cards must be built, in suit as well as sequence, onto the piles started by the Aces. This time the sequence is Aces high i.e. A K Q J 10 9 8 7. Alternatively cards may be played to an opponent's reserve pile, again in suit and sequence. Müller adds that a player may only turn one card when it is his turn, but that any number of cards may be played off his reserve pile if they can be used to build. In addition he states that, when a player's talon is used up, rather than turning over the reserve to form a new talon, players continue playing off the reserve. The last player holding cards is the "old maid" (Alte Jungfer).

== Literature ==
- Feder, Jan (1980). Die schönsten Kartenspiele. Knaur, Munich. ISBN 3-426-07628-4
- Gööck, Roland (1967). Freude am Kartenspiel, Bertelsmann, Gütersloh.
- Müller, Reiner F. (1994). Die bekanntesten Kartenspiele. Neff, Berlin. ISBN 3-8118-5856-4
