= Old New York (novellas) =

1924 novella collection by Edith Wharton

Old New York is a 1924 collection of four novellas by Edith Wharton, revolving around upper-class New York City society in the 1840s, 1850s, 1860s, and 1870s.

== Overview ==
The novellas are not directly interconnected, though certain fictional characters appear in more than one story. The New York of these stories is the same as the New York of The Age of Innocence (1920), from which several fictional characters have spilled over into these stories. The observation of the manners and morals of 19th century New York upper-class society is directly reminiscent of The Age of Innocence, but these novellas are shaped more as character studies than as a full-blown novel.

Some characters who overlap among these four stories and The Age of Innocence: Mrs. (Catherine) Manson Mingott, Sillerton Jackson, Mrs. Lemuel Struthers, Henry Van der Luyden. Other families and institutions also appear in more than one place among this extended set of New York stories.

== The four novellas ==
The decades indicated in the subtitles to the stories make them prequels, after a fashion, to The Age of Innocence. All five might as well be cut from the same bolt of cloth, sharing settings, characters, social insight, a similar knowing eye for a telling detail, and the occasional prop (a canary coach, an ormolu clock).

=== False Dawn (Parts One and Two) (The Forties) ===
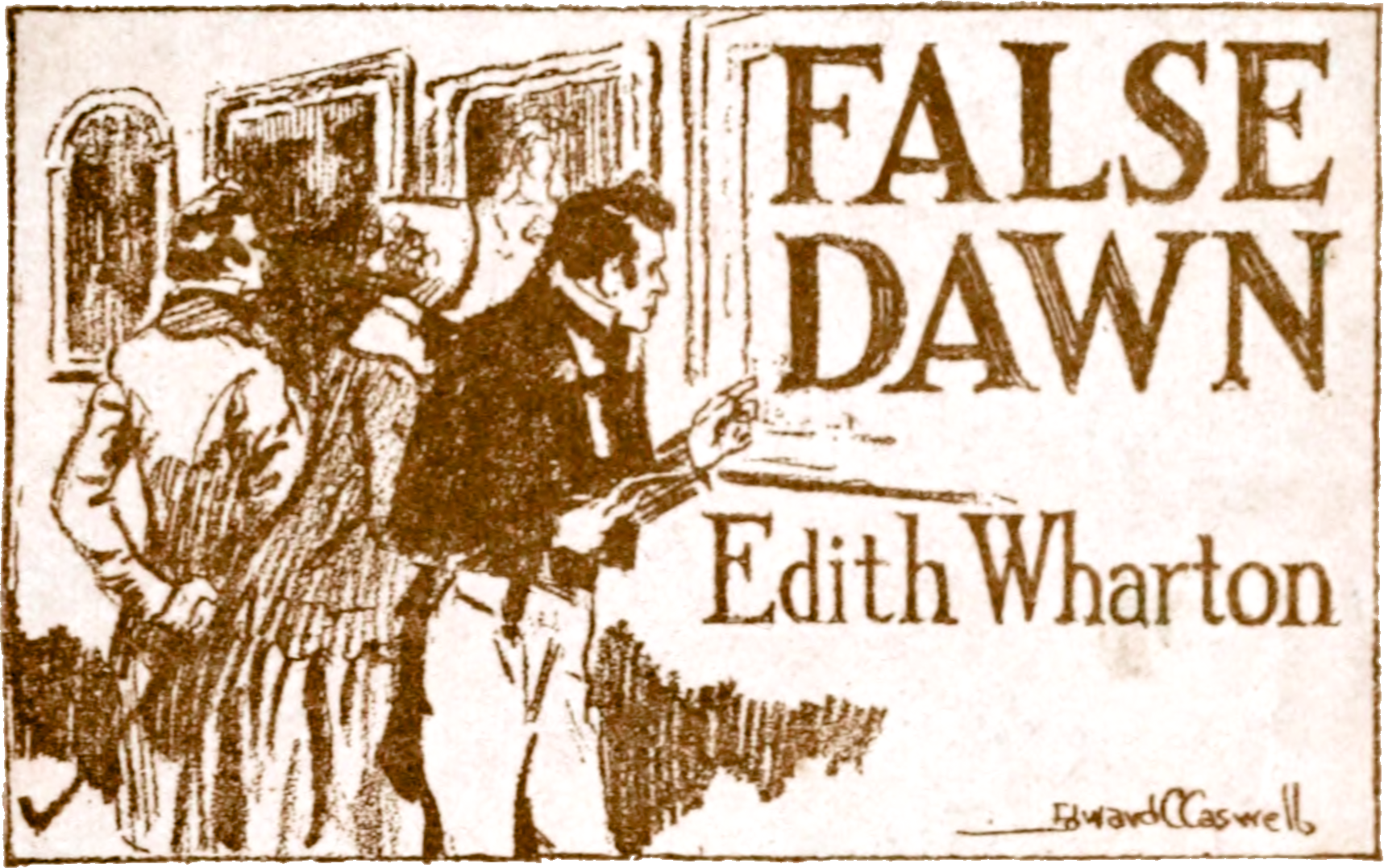

Lewis Raycie, just turned 21 years old, is sent to Europe by his father, Halston Raycie, to collect great art as the seed of a collection by which the senior Raycie hopes to be known to posterity. Halston Raycie has made his own fortune; he intends to be known to history as the patriarch of a dynasty. Lewis is expected to bring back works of art by well-known artists already acknowledged and accepted by New York's reigning tastemakers. He knows what is expected of him, but in Europe he makes friends, including John Ruskin, who influence him to buy instead works, which they consider superior, by artists heretofore unknown in New York. When Lewis shows the works to his father upon returning, his father is dismayed at his choices. His father to all practical measures disowns Lewis. Dying shortly thereafter, his father also is not able to disapprove of Lewis's choice in marriage. Lewis's beloved bears a striking resemblance to the subjects of the works Lewis bought with his father's fortune, and together they open a gallery to show his works. New York society in general disapproves of the works, and it is not until decades later, long after all the Raycies have died, that the art Lewis chose is recognized as valuable.

=== The Old Maid (Parts One and Two) (The Fifties) ===
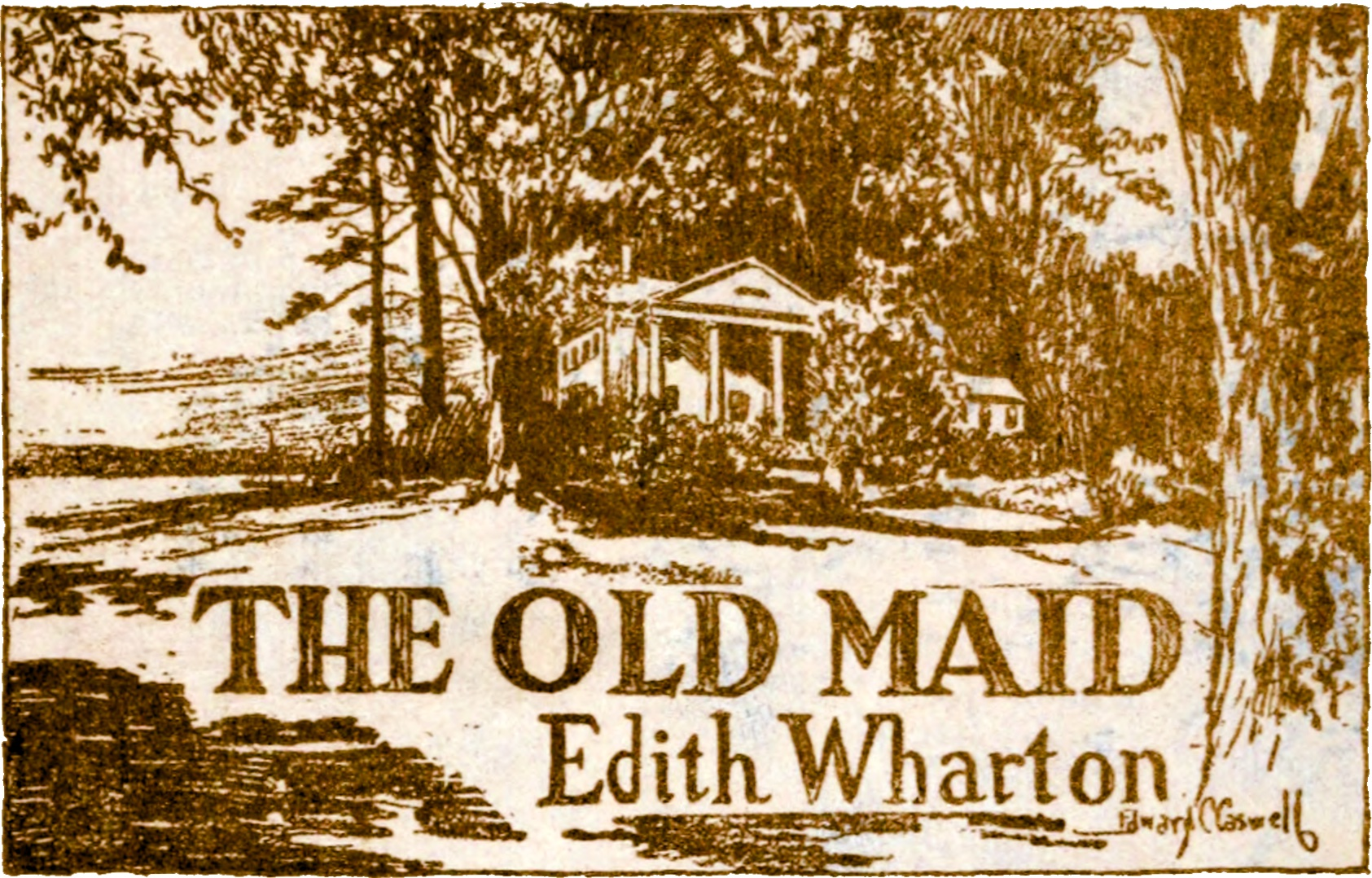

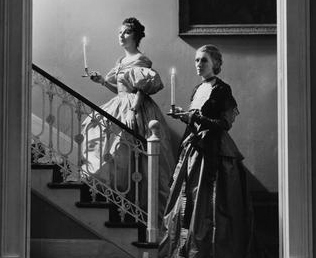
Judith Anderson and Helen Menken in the original Broadway production of Zoë Akins' play The Old Maid (1935), winner of the Pulitzer Prize for Drama

This novella takes up a full third of the set and is considered the most richly developed characters and storyline.

Delia Ralston, née Lovell, receives her cousin Charlotte ("Chatty") Lovell, who is about to be married. Charlotte confesses that she is the mother of an infamous foundling child. Her intended, Joe Ralston, who does not know of her child, wishes her to abandon her work at the orphanage where the child lives. Charlotte does not want to give up seeing her daughter, Clementina ("Tina"). The child's father is Clement Spender, a New Yorker who moved overseas to pursue the life of an artist. At one time, Delia was also romantically attracted to Spender. Delia agrees to see to it that Tina and Charlotte are not separated, but she also sees to it that Charlotte is not allowed to marry Joe Ralston (a cousin of Delia's husband Jim). Delia's husband dies, and Charlotte and Tina move into Delia's home. When Tina comes of age, since she is known to society as an orphan, with no family or estate, her marriage prospects are dim, although she attracts many suitors. Charlotte fears that Tina will repeat the pattern Charlotte started, by getting pregnant before she finds a husband. To avert this fate, Delia adopts Tina as her own daughter, and Tina finds a fiancé. The story ends on the night before Tina is to marry, with heightened tension between the two older women over who has the right to be considered Tina's mother.

The novella was adapted for the stage by Zoë Akins, and won the 1935 Pulitzer Prize for Drama. A film version was subsequently produced in 1939 by Warner Bros. Directed by Edmund Goulding, the film starred Bette Davis in an acclaimed performance as Charlotte, with Miriam Hopkins as Delia and George Brent as Clem Spender. The studio had difficulties getting approval from the Production Code Administration due to the story's themes of an illicit affair and the illegitimacy of the child.

=== The Spark (The Sixties) ===
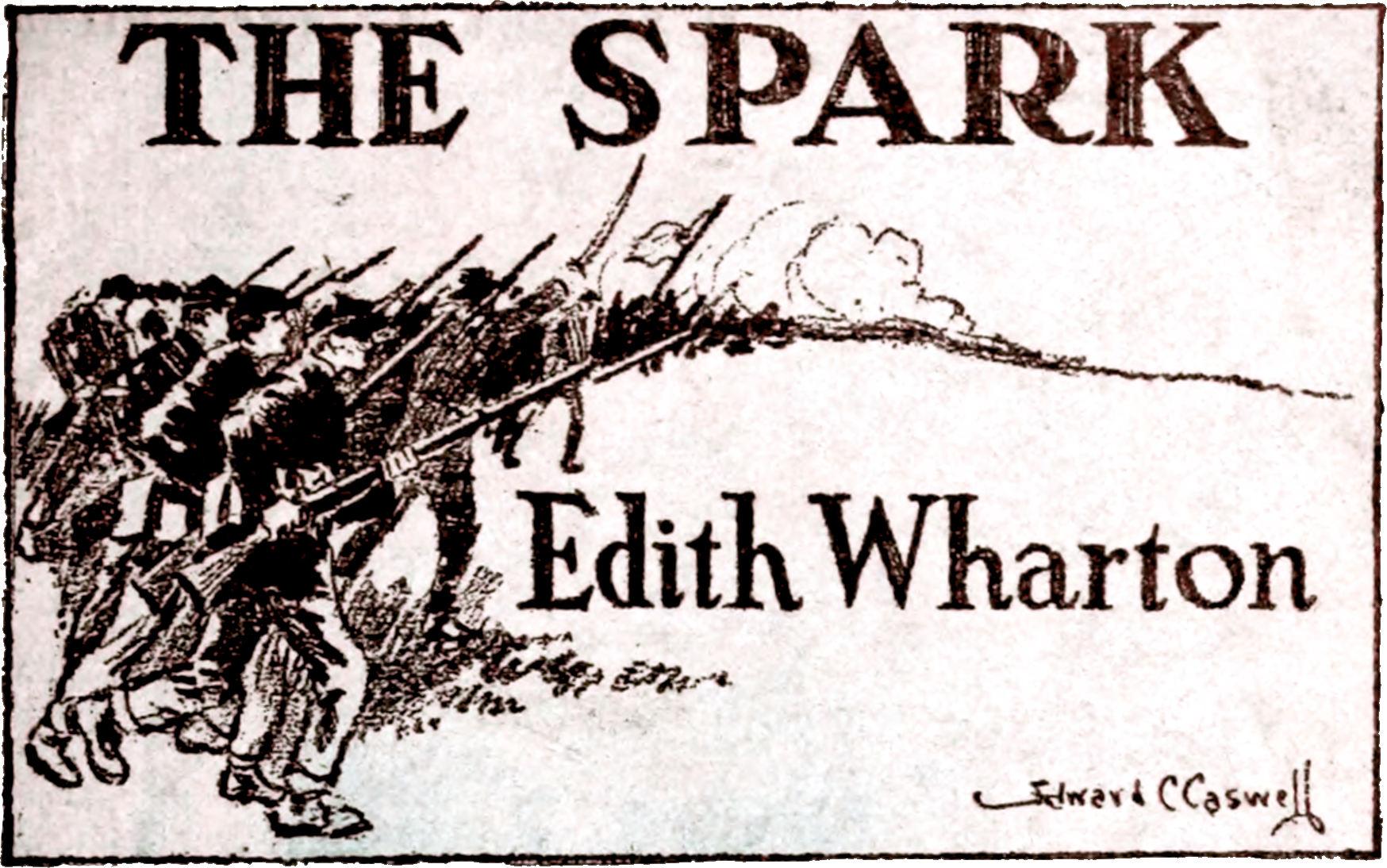

The least formally developed of the four novellas is told from the perspective of the 1890s, though its period of interest purports to be the 1860s. It regards Hayley Delane, who was a schoolboy when the Civil War started. He ran off to join the war, was wounded at Bull Run, and spent a long time recovering in a hospital camp in Washington. There he met a mysterious stranger, whose memory has stayed with him all these years, almost a spiritual or moral guide. Delane marries Leila Gracy, daughter of old Bill Gracy, a drinker and gambler of ill repute. The narrator observes that Hayley Delane seems to belong to a different age, trying to guess whether he would fit in better as a Roman or a Greek or some other ancient European. Leila alternates between being devoted to Hayley and devoted to affairs with other men. The narrator witnesses Hayley beating one of her suitors when Hayley sees him abusing a polo pony. The narrator acknowledges that there's not much story behind the character sketch. Hayley takes Bill Gracy into his house as the old man gets older and needs assistance; Leila puts up with her father for a while and then drifts off to Europe; Hayley, unperturbed by her judgment or society's, continues caring for his father-in-law. Hayley comes to visit the narrator one day and discovers by accident that the old fellow he knew from the Civil War hospital camp was Walt Whitman. The narrator reveres Whitman and his writing; Hayley doesn't think much of it.

=== New Year's Day (The Seventies) ===
Society thinks little of Mrs. Lizzie Hazeldean's apparent affair with the unmarried Henry Prest. As it turns out, society's understanding of the affair is uninformed and insensitive.

All the stories are filled with dense and lively interplay of ideas. Religion, women's rights, art criticism, the strictures and structures of society, the place of wealth among Manhattan's élite class, familial loyalty, love and passion and honor, are all examined in the spotlight of Wharton's scrutiny, interwoven with Wharton's incisive, often aphoristic observations about a society she knew well from having been raised in it. An example, from "New Year's Day": "The self-sufficing little society of that vanished New York attached no great importance to wealth, but regarded poverty as so distasteful that it simply took no account of it." Throughout, Wharton captures a keen sense of the arc of time; frequently remarking nostalgically on things that change or are lost with the passage of generations (objects, locations, families, institutions, mores). Innumerable illuminating subplots and details have been omitted in the synopses.

== Publication ==
The four novellas were first published in 1924 by D. Appleton and Company, with illustrations by Edward C. Caswell. The copyright was renewed in 1951 by William R. Tyler and expired on January 1, 2020, when the work entered the public domain. They are currently (2011) available in a trade paper edition from Scribner, released in 1995 (ISBN 978-0-02-038314-7) and in hardcover from Library of America.
