= Winifred Fraser =

English actress

Fraser in 1903

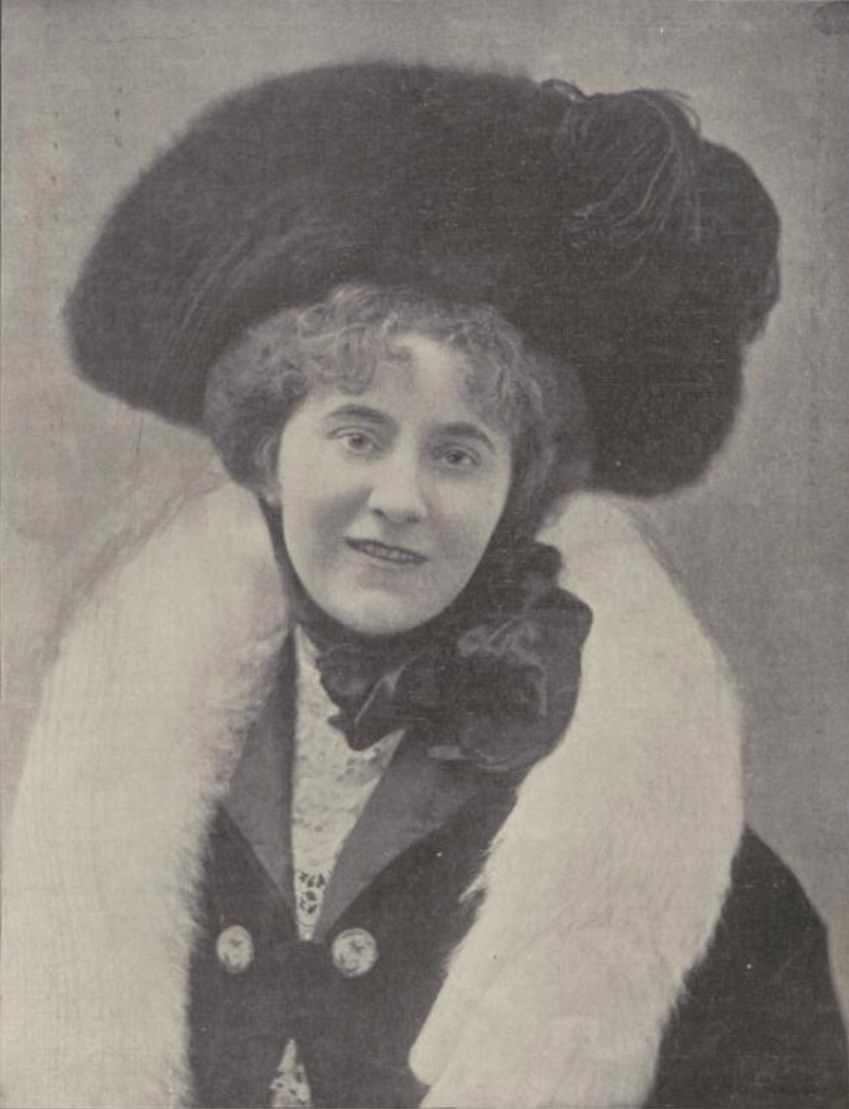
With the Brough-Flemming Comedy Company in Australia in 1906

Winifred Fraser, née Day (29 February 1868 – 25 November 1951), was an English actress. After building a career in supporting roles in London and on tour from 1888 to 1910, she moved to the US, where she appeared in numerous Broadway productions in the 1910s and 1920s, before retiring to England.

== Life and career ==
=== Early years ===
Fraser was born in City Road, London, the daughter of the Rev Edward Day, vicar of St Mark's church, Shoreditch. She was educated in Hampstead and made her professional stage debut in 1888 as Sophia Primrose in an adaptation of The Vicar of Wakefield. She soon adopted the stage name Winifred Fraser.

She toured with Ben Greet's company in the classical repertory, and with other companies in more modern works. Her London debut was at the Criterion Theatre in November 1889 as Alice in G. H. Dabbs's Her Own Witness. After this she played several supporting roles in West End debut productions, including Rosie in Effie Bancroft's curtain-raiser My Daughter and Lucy Lorimer in Sydney Grundy's A Pair of Spectacles with John Hare. In April 1892 she married the actor and manager George Rose Foss (1859–1938), with whom she had a daughter, born in the following year. According to the Oxford Dictionary of National Biography (ODNB), "Within a decade they were separated, and were presumably later divorced, as her husband remarried".

During the 1890s Fraser acted for many of the leading figures in the London theatre, including Greet, Olga Nethersole, E. S. Willard, and Augustus Harris. In 1900 she was part of Mrs Patrick Campbell's company, playing Eileen to Campbell's Paula in The Second Mrs Tanqueray and appearing in the first London production of Edmond Rostand's Les Romanesques, given as The Fantasticks. In 1903 she understudied Nina Boucicault in the title role of J. M. Barrie's Little Mary, and, according to the ODNB, "subsequently made the part her own", playing it in many revivals at Wyndham's Theatre, and in 1905–06 touring it, with other leading roles, around Australia. In 1907 she toured in The School for Scandal and The Importance of Being Earnest. In she made her first appearance in the US, playing Barbara Pennymint in Pomander Walk, by Louis N. Parker, at Wallack's Theatre, New York, and in the following two years toured the role around the country.

=== Later years ===
After this, Fraser made her career in the US. She returned to classical repertoire in 1913, taking the role of Good-Dedes in a production of Everyman at the New York Children's Theater. She remained in the US for the duration of the First World War, and, in the words of the ODNB, "by this time in her forties, carved out a niche for herself in New York playing the many middle-aged matrons who populate turn-of-the-century melodramas". She also appeared in comedy, including nearly a year as Mrs Martha Van Zile in Polly With a Past, by George Middleton and Guy Bolton, at the Belasco Theatre in 1917–18. Her post-war roles included Mrs Morland in Barrie's Mary Rose (1920), Mrs Smallwood in The Enchanted Cottage, by Arthur Pinero (1923), and Mrs Considine in Mary, Mary, Quite Contrary, by St John Ervine (1923).

The ODNB records that from the late 1920s Fraser had addresses in London, and was subsequently resident in Eastbourne, Sussex, where she died on 25 November 1951. Her daughter, Iris Fraser Foss (1893–1973), also an actress, survived her.

== Sources ==
- Parker, John, ed. (1922). Who's Who in the Theatre (fourth ed.). London: Sir Isaac Pitman and Sons. OCLC 473894893.
