= Sylvia Ashley =

English model, actress and socialite

Princess Sylvia Jorjadze
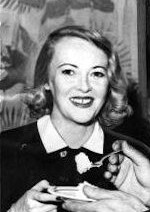
- Born: Edith Louisa Hawkes; 1 April 1904; Paddington, London, England
- Died: 29 June 1977 (aged 73); Los Angeles, California, U.S.
- Other names: Sylvia Hawkes; Lady Ashley
- Occupations: Model; actress; socialite
- Spouses: Lord Ashley (m. 1927; div. 1934) Douglas Fairbanks (m. 1936; died 1939) The 6th Baron Stanley of Alderley (m. 1944; div. 1948) Clark Gable (m. 1949; div. 1952) Prince Dimitri Jorjadze (m. 1954)

Sylvia, Lady Ashley (born Edith Louisa Hawkes, 1 April 1904 – 29 June 1977) was an English model, actress, and socialite who was best known for her numerous marriages to British and Georgian noblemen and American film stars.

== Early life ==
Ashley was born Edith Louisa Hawkes on 1 April 1904, at 112 Hall Place, Paddington, London, England, the elder daughter of Edith Florence Hyde and Arthur Hawkes. The family moved to nearby Wharncliffe Gardens, Lisson Grove, before 1910. She later renamed herself Sylvia and preferred giving her year of birth as 1906. Her 1927 marriage certificate records her name as Edith Louisa Sylvia Hawkes and her father as Arthur Hawkes (deceased), gentleman.

Her father was a livery stable employee, latterly porter in a block of flats and doorman at a restaurant. When he died, his younger daughter administered his estate.

Ashley's sister, Lilian Vera Hawkes married British film producer Basil Bleck on 18 December 1929.

== Professional career ==
As Sylvia Hawkes, she worked as a lingerie model and became a Cochran Dancer. After this brief career in the chorus line of musical comedy, she appeared in West End plays. In 1924, she debuted in Midnight Follies. She appeared in Primrose. In 1925, she acted in Tell me More at London's Winter Garden Theatre, and in The Whole Town's Talking.

In the 1920s, Ashley regularly appeared on stage with American writer Dorothy Fields in the comedy duo "Silly and Dotty" in "Midnight Follies" at the London Metropole.

On 1 March 1941, Lady Ashley filed articles of incorporation to establish an organisation known as the British Distressed Areas Fund. Organised along with her sister, Vera Bleck, Constance Bennett, and Virginia Fox Zanuck, as directors, the Fund focused on soliciting financial support to provide food, clothing and medical aid for refugees of World War II. The headquarters of the organisation was located in Los Angeles, California.

=== Primrose audition ===
In their joint memoir Bring on the Girls!, P. G. Wodehouse and Guy Bolton relate the story of Ashley's audition for George Grossmith Jr. for the 1924 musical Primrose:

"Must I sing, Mr Grossmith?"

"Yes, Sylvia, you must. All of you have to sing if you want jobs as showgirls in Primrose. The Gershwin score demands it."

"Oh very well," she replied petulantly, and, going down to the floats she handed over a piece of music to the pianist in the pit. The piano struck a chord.

God save our gracious King,
Long live our noble King,
God save the King.

Grossmith, a strict observer of ritual, rose and stood at attention. His minions rose and stood at attention. Guy, on his way to announce his arrival, stood at attention.

As the anthem came to the normal stopping point, George started to sit down, but there is more, much more of the fine old choral than is generally known. James Carey is credited with a three-stanza version; in another version John Bull... has expressed the same sentiment in his own way; while James Oswald... also got into the act. A printing is extant giving them all. Sylvia Hawkes sang them all. The pianist stopped playing, but that didn't stop Sylvia. They wanted her to sing, did they? Well, sing she would. Of course no one dared to call a halt. The national anthem is sacrosanct – especially if you're an actor-manager clinging to the hope of a belated knighthood.

== Personal life ==
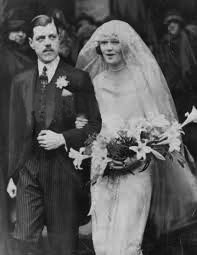
Lord Ashley and Sylvia Ashley

Ashley was married five times:

- Major Lord Ashley (married 3 February 1927 – 28 November 1934; divorced).
- Douglas Fairbanks, Sr., American actor (married 7 March 1936 – 12 December 1939, his death).
- The 6th Baron Stanley of Alderley (married 18 January 1944 – 1948; divorced).
- Clark Gable, American actor (married 20 December 1949 – 21 April 1952; divorced).
- Prince Dimitri Jorjadze, hotel executive and race-car driver (married 1954).

Lady Ashley died of cancer on 29 June 1977 at age 73 in Los Angeles. She is interred in the Hollywood Forever Cemetery, Hollywood.
