= Polly With a Past =

Polly With a Past may refer to:

- A 1917 Broadway play by George Middleton and Guy Bolton.
- A 1920 silent film based on the play.
