= Primrose (musical) =

Musical composed by George Gershwin

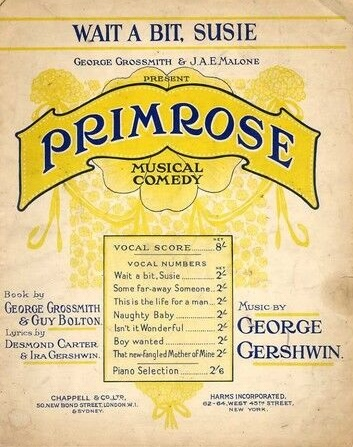
- Sheet music for "Wait A Bit, Susie" from Primrose
- Music: George Gershwin
- Lyrics: Desmond Carter and Ira Gershwin
- Book: Guy Bolton and George Grossmith Jr.
- Productions: 1924 West End

Primrose is a musical in three acts with a book by Guy Bolton and George Grossmith Jr., lyrics by Desmond Carter and Ira Gershwin, and music by George Gershwin. It centres on a writer whose story-within-a-story forms the basis of the plot. It was written expressly for London's West End, where it ran for 255 performances in 1924 and 1925. The musical played in Australia, but it was not performed in the United States until more than half a century after it was written.

George Gershwin, at 25 years old, was an established songwriter by 1924 when Grossmith and his producing partners, J. A. E. Malone and Edward Laurillard, hired him to produce the score for Primrose for them in London. The musical is the first in which Gershwin wrote some of the orchestrations himself. The year was one of the busiest for Gershwin, as it also included his Rhapsody in Blue and two other musicals. Gershwin's score, and the book by Bolton are old-fashioned for their time, with more in common with the frothy Edwardian musical comedies than with the later Gershwin musicals. Nevertheless, Desmond Carter's witty lyrics and the show's farcical book have been praised by reviewers, while Gershwin's score has been compared with Gilbert and Sullivan. A piano vocal edition of the score was published in London in 1924, but Gershwin's manuscript was considered lost until it was found in America in 1982.

== Production history ==
Primrose was produced by Grossmith and J. A. E. Malone, who wanted to follow up on their earlier successes composed by Jerome Kern. It opened at the Winter Garden Theatre in London on 11 September 1924 only two months before the Gershwins’ Lady, Be Good! debuted on Broadway. The cast featured comedian Leslie Henson and also included Claude Hulbert, Heather Thatcher and opera baritone Percy Heming. The director was Charles A. Maynard, and the choreographer was Laddie Cliff. Extensive excerpts from the score were recorded with original 1924 cast members conducted by Ansell, and have been re-released on CD. P. G. Wodehouse rewrote the lyric of 'When Toby is out of Town' as 'The Twenties are Here to Stay', interpolated into a 1960 revival of Gershwin's Oh, Kay!

In their joint memoir Bring on the Girls!, Wodehouse and Bolton relate a story about Grossmith holding auditions for Primrose, where he made a routine request of Sylvia Hawkes, a beautiful young dancer, who later married a series of famous men:

"Must I sing, Mr Grossmith?"

"Yes, Sylvia, you must. All of you have to sing if you want jobs as showgirls in Primrose. The Gershwin score demands it."

"Oh very well," she replied petulantly, and, going down to the floats she handed over a piece of music to the pianist in the pit. The piano struck a chord.

"God save our gracious King,
Long live our noble King,
God save the King."

Grossmith, a strict observer of ritual, rose and stood at attention. His minions rose and stood at attention. Guy, on his way to announce his arrival, stood at attention. As the anthem came to the normal stopping point, George started to sit down, but there is more, much more of the fine old chorale than is generally known. James Carey is credited with a three-stanza version; in another version John Bull... has expressed the same sentiment in his own way; while James Oswald... also got into the act. A printing is extant giving them all. Sylvia Hawkes sang them all. The pianist stopped playing, but that didn't stop Sylvia. They wanted her to sing, did they? Well, sing she would. Of course no one dared to call a halt. The national anthem is sacrosanct – especially if you're an actor-manager clinging to the hope of a belated knighthood.

An Australian production with Maude Fane and Alfred Frith opened in Melbourne, at His Majesty's Theatre in April 1925, before touring nationally. It was produced by J. C. Williamson's company.

The show was not produced on Broadway, where it would have competed with Lady, Be Good!. The American première of Primrose did not take place until 1987, when an unstaged concert production at the Coolidge Auditorium of the Library of Congress was given, without dialogue, together with another Gershwin score, Pardon My English (1933), both conducted by John McGlinn. Soloists included Rebecca Luker and Kim Criswell. The next performance in North America was in 2003, when Musicals Tonight! presented a series of staged concerts at the 14th Street YMCA in New York City's Greenwich Village, with dialogue, but accompanied only by piano, directed by Thomas Mills. Ohio Light Opera mounted the first fully staged American production of the show in 2017.

== Roles and original cast ==
- Jason – Ernest Graham
- Freddie Falls – Claude Hulbert
- May Rooker – Vera Lennox
- Sir Benjamin Falls – Guy Vane
- Joan – Margery Hicklin
- Hilary Vane – Percy Heming
- Toby Mopham – Leslie Henson
- Michael – Thomas Weguelin
- Manager of hotel – Harold Bradley
- Pinkie Peach (Mdme Frazeline) – Heather Thatcher
- Lady Sophia Mopham – Murial Barnby
- Pritchard – Sylvia Hawkes

== Plot summary ==
Setting: Act 1: A houseboat moored at a dock along the upper Thames; Act II: A seaside resort in France; Act III: Mopham House, Park Lane, London

Primrose consists of three interconnected love stories about Freddie and May, Hilary and Joan, and Toby and Pinkie. Freddie is reluctantly engaged to his cousin Joan, but falls in love with amateur golfer May Rooker. Joan, a naive, pretty young socialite, loves dashing Hilary Vane, a successful author of romantic yarns who lives on a houseboat. Hilary is writing a story whose heroine, Miss Primrose, is at a similar impasse. Hilary returns Joan's love, but Freddie and Joan are under the thumb of Sir Barnaby Falls – Joan's guardian and Freddie's uncle – who, for financial reasons, refuses consent to their marrying anyone except each other.

The romance of aristocratic Toby Mopham and the vulgar but ambitious beautician Pinkie Peach is impeded by Toby's second thoughts after rashly proposing; he enlists Hilary's to pretend to woo Pinkie so that Toby can catch them in flagrante and break off the engagement. However, Joan also catches Hilary wooing Pinkie. During an eventful dance sequence, Toby overcomes his reluctance to marry, Sir Barnaby gives way, and all three couples are free to marry.

== Song list ==
- Overture
- Leaving Town While We May (The Countryside) – Chorus
- Till I Meet Someone Like You – Freddie and May
- Isn't it Wonderful – Joan and chorus of men
- This Is the Life for a Man – Hilary
- When Toby Is out of Town – Toby and chorus of women
- Some Far-Away Someone – Joan and Hilary
- The Mophams – Toby, Pinkie and Michael
- Finale, Act I – Company
- Opening chorus – Chorus
- Four Little Sirens – Quartet
- Berkeley Square and Kew – Freddie and Joan
- Boy Wanted – Pinkie and chorus
- Mary Queen of Scots – Freddie and Toby
- Wait a Bit, Susie – Hilary, Joan and chorus
- Naughty Baby – Joan and chorus of men
- Finale, Act II – Company
- Ballet – Orchestral
- That New Fangled Mother of Mine – Toby
- I Make Hay when the Moon Shines – Pinkie
- Beau Brummell – Hilary and chorus
- Finale, Act III – Company
