= Adam and Eva (play) =

1919 American play by Guy Bolton and George Middleton

- Ruth Shepley and Otto Kruger
- Original language: English
- Written by: Guy Bolton and George Middleton
- First publication: 1923
- Subject: Adam Smith and home economics
- Genre: Comedy
- Setting: A manor home on Long Island; a farm in New Jersey

Premiere
- Date: September 13, 1919
- Place: Longacre Theatre
- Directed by: Robert Milton
- Original run: 312 performances

Adam and Eva is a play by Guy Bolton and George Middleton, first produced in 1919. It is a comedy in three acts and four scenes, with two settings, and ten characters. The action of the play takes place over three months time. The story concerns a wealthy rubber baron who brings in his business manager to curb his family's extravagance.

The play was first produced by F. Ray Comstock, staged by Robert Milton, and starred Otto Kruger and Ruth Shepley. Adam and Eva had an opening tour starting at Detroit in February 1919, playing a number of cities through April of that year. After acquiring a co-producer in Morris Gest, it was scheduled for tryout performances in New Jersey during August 1919, but they were cancelled and the Broadway premiere delayed due to the Actors' Equity strike. Adam and Eva ran on Broadway from September 1919 through May 1920, for 312 performances. Burns Mantle included it among the season's ten best works in The Best Plays of 1919-20.

Adam and Eva was adapted for a 1923 silent film of the same name.

== Characters ==
Characters are listed in order of appearance within their scope.

Lead

- Eva King is the younger daughter of James King, charming, kind and resourceful.
- Adam Smith is a young bachelor, who has managed King's rubber plantations on the Amazon.

Supporting

- James King is 50, a widower, owner of King Rubber Company, who varies between kindliness and gruffness.
- Julie King DeWitt is 24, James' older daughter, married to the doting and unemployable Clinton DeWitt.
- Clinton DeWitt is a fashionable and impecunious scion of a famous New York family.
- Lord Andrew Gordon is a Scottish aristocrat, a superb horseman, but save Eva, without prospects. (Note: Excepting his reference to Robert the Bruce, his dialogue in the play leans perilously close to Bertie Wooster, and one reviewer exclaimed "the character might just as well be English".)

Featured

- Corinthia is the King's young parlor maid; loyal, perceptive, and self-sacrificing.
- Aunt Abby Rocker is the sister of King's late wife; a compulsive joiner of clubs and charities.
- Dr. Jack Delamater is a neighbor of the King's, a physician and fortune-hunter.
- Uncle Horace Pilgrim is a hypochondriac cousin to James King, another dependent of long-standing.

== Synopsis ==

Act I (Library of the King home on Long Island. Morning.) Appalled by the stack of bills brought in by Corinthia, James King tries to reason with his extravagant daughter Julie and her husband Clinton about clothing purchases. They are unmoved by his sarcasm, as are Aunt Abby with club bills, and daughter Eva about the expenses of horse-riding with Lord Andrew. King suggests the family will go to the Newark farm instead of a fashionable resort this season. The others come up with a plan to get Dr. Delamarter to prescribe a solitary vacation for father, leaving them free. Meanwhile, Adam Smith comes to plead for a re-assignment; he is so lonely on the rubber plantation in South America. The solitary life up the Amazon stirs King's fancy. He decides to exchange positions with Adam, whose honesty and resourcefulness he admires. Adam will take over managing the family finances, while King goes up the river. Uncle Horace tips King to the medical plot, but he satisfies the family with his proposed Amazon voyage. They eye Adam speculatively, particularly Eva, who announces she will call him "Father". (Curtain)

Act II (Scene 1:Same as Act I. Ten days later, 5:30 pm.) Adam quickly realizes that no amount of reasoning or cajolery will divert the family from its spendthrift ways. He incurs resentment from Julie and Eva for denying them money. Lord Andrew, sincere about Eva, gives up his title to show his commitment to staying in America. Dr. Delameter, however, proves to be a mere fortune-hunter. Adam is working at the headquarters of King Rubber Company while serving in loco parentis. When Dr. Delameter suggests a scheme to get rid of Lord Andrew by faking a bankruptcy, Adam turns the tables by saying it has really happened. Dr. Delameter, convinced of the disaster, now awkwardly backs out of the running for Eva. Adam burgles the old safe so the girls' will not try to sell their jewels. (Quick curtain)

(Scene 2:Same as Act I. One hour later.) Adam now plays a touching scene for the family. He tells them that James King has gone bankrupt, and they must immediately relocate to the New Jersey farm where King grew up, so the Long Island home can be sold. He pleads with them not to mention the ruin in their letters to King, and insures the office also co-operates. Surprisingly, Andrew (no longer a Lord) decides to go with the family; it appears he has more money than they realized. (Curtain)

Act III (The King farm, near Newark, New Jersey. Thanksgiving Day, three months later.) The family rallies to the working farm life, with Eva, Corinthia, and Julie managing the apple trees, chickens and eggs, and beehive honey, for sale to local markets. Uncle Horace becomes a life insurance salesman, Andrew has started a livery business, while Clinton sells neckties at a local store. Aunt Abby has married a wealthy old man and moved away. Adam gets covert assistance from Corthinia, who though she herself likes him, decides to help win Eva from Andrew. King, returning from the Amazon, is surprised at the family's productivity and embrace of the work ethic, but horrified when he hears of the supposed ruin. Adam confesses it was merely a trick. Andrew tells Adam and Eva they are in love with one another, and gracefully withdraws as they embrace and kiss. (Curtain)

== Original production ==
=== Background ===
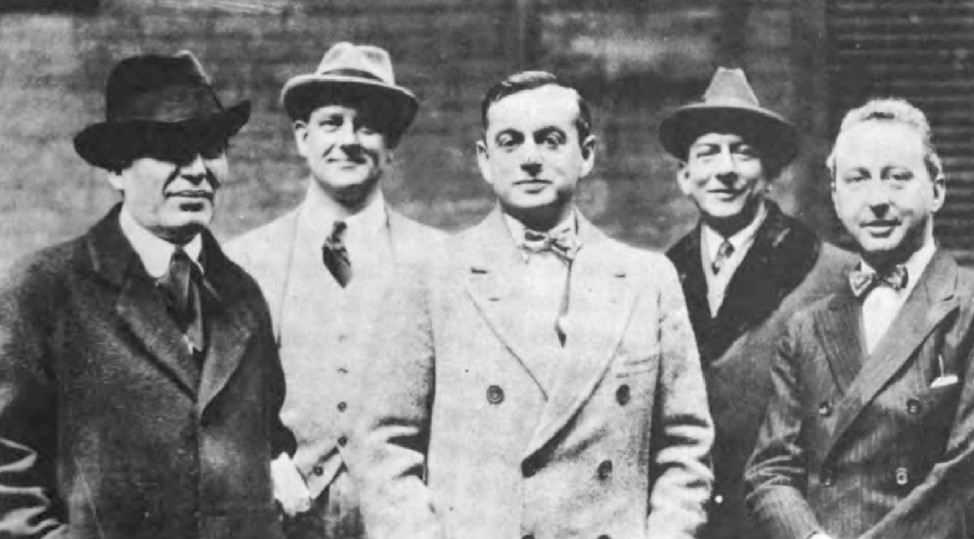
Morris Gest, P. G. Wodehouse, Guy Bolton, Ray Comstock and Jerome Kern

Playwright Guy Bolton was a frequent collaborator with producers F. Ray Comstock and Morris Gest for comedies and musicals. He often co-wrote plays with P. G. Wodehouse, but for Adam and Eva his co-author was George Middleton. They had previously worked together on the 1917 Broadway hit, Polly with a Past. Adam and Eva was one of two plays the team sold to Comstock and Gest this season. The other, purportedly a translation from the French called The Light of the World, would have a brief Broadway run in January 1920. (Note: Bolton and Middleton were unused to writing dramas, so they made up a fictitious French playwright named Pierre Saisson, and presented their work as a translation of a play given in Paris just before the Great War. Bolton and Middleton admitted their deception two days after The Light of the World premiered, and explained their reasons for doing so.)

Ray Comstock was reported to have recruited Ruth Shepley, Courtenay Foote, and Ferdinand Gottschalk for Adam and Eva in mid-January 1919, with rehearsals to begin soon. The remainder of the cast was announced at the end of that month. Robert Milton, another frequent collaborator with Comstock and Gest, staged the play.

=== Cast ===
Cast for the opening tour and the Broadway run. Production on hiatus from April 27 through September 12, 1919.
Role	Actor	Dates	Notes and sources
Eva King	Ruth Shepley	Feb 17, 1919 - May 29, 1920	Maria Namara took this role when Shepley was out ill for several days in January 1920..
Adam Smith	Otto Kruger	Feb 17, 1919 - May 29, 1920	
James King	John Flood	Feb 17, 1919 - Apr 26, 1920	While the production was on hiatus, Flood left for a part in Clarence.
James King	Berton Churchill	Sep 13, 1919 - May 29, 1920	
Julie DeWitt	Roberta Arnold	Feb 17, 1919 - May 29, 1920	
Clinton DeWitt	Reginald Mason	Feb 17, 1919 - May 29, 1920	
Lord Andrew	Courtenay Foote	Feb 17, 1919 - May 29, 1920	At least one reviewer found the Yorkshire-born Foote unconvincing as a Scotsman.
Corinthia	Jean Shelby	Feb 17, 1919 - Mar 25, 1920	Her part was taken for several weeks by general understudy Maria Namara.
Corinthia	Maria Namara	Mar 27, 1920 - May 29, 1920	Namara took over permanently when Shelby resigned to get married.
Aunt Abby	Adelaide Prince	Feb 17, 1919 - May 29, 1920	
Dr. Delamater	William B. Mack	Feb 17, 1919 - Apr 26, 1920	While the production was on hiatus, Mack left for a part in A Voice in the Dark.
Dr. Delamater	Richard Sterling	Sep 13, 1919 - May 29, 1920	Understudy David Munro took this part in February 1920 when Sterling was trapped by a snowstorm on Long Island.
Uncle Horace	Ferdinand Gottschalk	Feb 17, 1919 - May 29, 1920	

=== Opening tour ===
The first ever performance of Adam and Eva was presented at Detroit's Garrick Theatre, on February 17, 1919. The local reviewer was positive as to the play's merit, especially in the reformation of the spendthrifts, and declared the cast "an uncommonly able one". The production went next to the Shubert-Colonial Theatre in Cleveland, starting February 24, 1919, where a critic said that familiar situations were presented with "considerable wit". Brief engagements at the Shubert Belasco Theatre in Washington, D. C., and the Shubert Auditorium in Baltimore followed.

The opening tour's final stop was at Boston's Park Square Theatre, starting March 17, 1919. The local reviewer called Adam and Eva "an amusing combination of fun and satire", and noted the general excellence of the cast. Adam and Eva closed in Boston on April 26, 1919. The production then went on hiatus, awaiting the new theatrical season before venturing on Broadway. Two actors, John Flood and William B. Mack, left for other productions during this time.

=== Actors' Equity strike ===
Newspaper advertising indicated Adam and Eva would open for a tryout at the Savoy Theatre in Asbury Park, New Jersey, starting August 9, 1919. The New York Times reported that Berton Churchill and Richard Sterling had joined that production, which would open on Broadway at the Longacre Theatre on August 19, 1919. Both items appeared in print on August 7, 1919, the same day that Actors' Equity Association voted to go out on strike. The Broadway premiere was delayed for the duration of the strike, while the sold-out tryout performance was cancelled and the audiences money refunded by the Savoy Theatre, which showed motion pictures during the labor dispute.

=== Broadway premiere and reception ===
The production had its Broadway premiere on Saturday, September 13, 1919, at the Longacre Theatre. The critic for The Brooklyn Daily Eagle called it "high comedy" and said "Deft and sparkling dialogue and clever characterization are its chief virtues". They did take fault with "the unusual nobility of everyone", and criticised Ruth Shepley for hogging center stage and using "like" as a conjunction. Heywood Broun conceded that "Adam and Eva makes no contribution to the wisdom of the world, but it is thoroughly amusing", and predicted "it will be among the successes of the season". Alexander Woollcott said the play has "the advantage of being well staged and played by a shrewdly chosen cast." Alone among reviewers he commented on the Act III juxtaposition of Adam, Eva, and the farm's apple orchard, but added "this is not that kind of play". (Note: However, even Woollcott seems to have missed the authors' playfulness in selecting the hero's full name.)

=== Broadway closing ===
Adam and Eva closed at the Longacre Theatre on Saturday, May 29, 1920, after 312 performances. Burns Mantle included it among the season's ten best works in The Best Plays of 1919-20.

== Bibliography ==
- Burns Mantle (ed). The Best Plays of 1919-20 and the Year Book of the Drama in America. Small, Maynard & Company, 1920.
- Guy Bolton and George Middleton. Adam and Eva: A Comedy in Three Acts. Samuel French, 1923.
