= Bring On the Girls =

Bring on the Girls may refer to:

- Bring On the Girls!, a story by P. G. Wodehouse
- Bring on the Girls (film), a 1945 American film
