= Robert Milton (director) =

American director and screenwriter (1885–1956)

- Born: January 24, 1885; Dinaburgh, Russian Empire
- Died: January 13, 1956 (aged 70); Los Angeles, California, US
- Other name: Robert Davidor
- Occupations: Writer, director
- Years active: 1929–1934 (film)

Robert Milton (January 24, 1885 – January 13, 1956) was a Russian-born screenwriter and film director who worked and settled in the United States. He wrote and directed for the stage, and directed three British films.

== Selected theatre credits ==
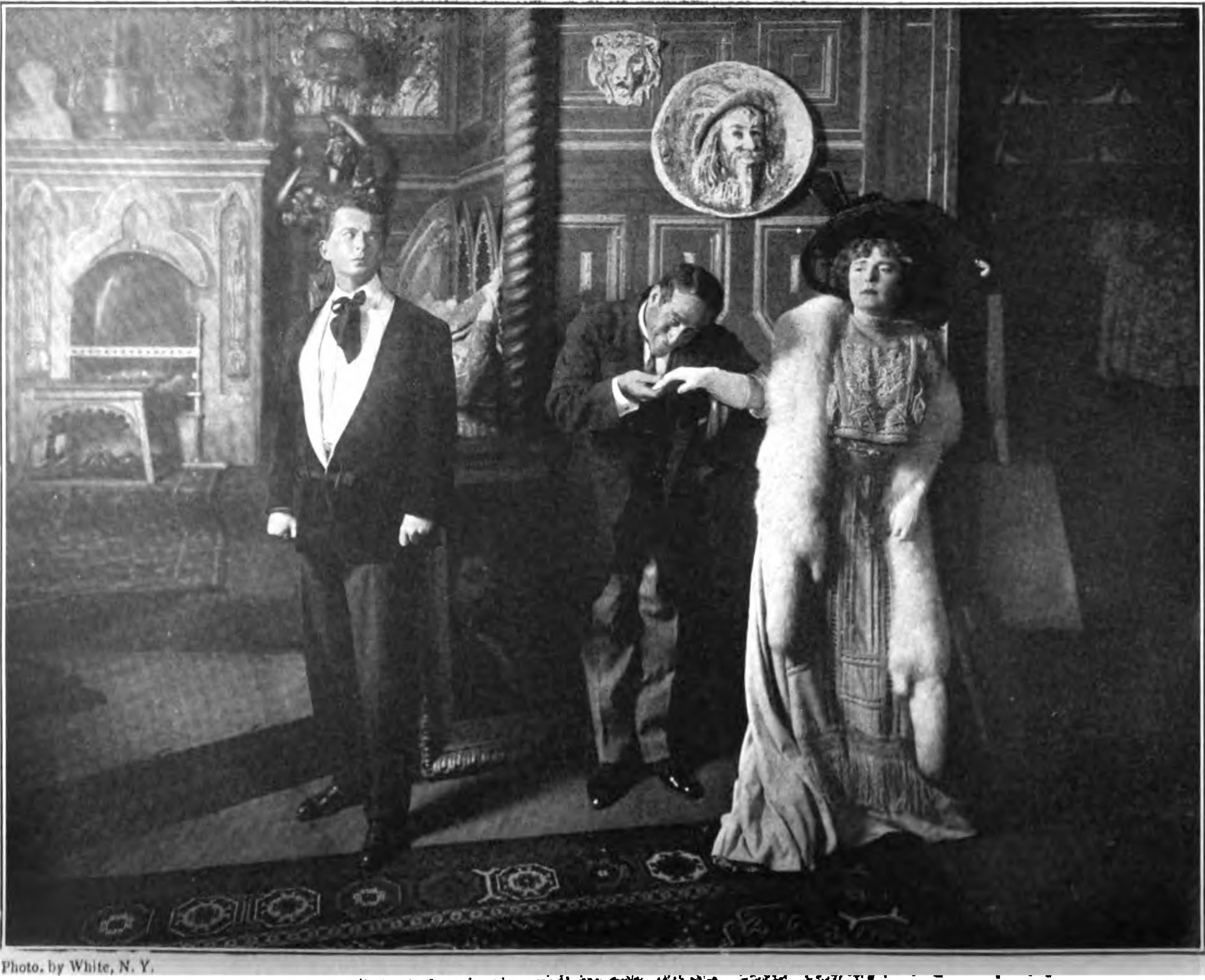
Milton directed one of the two competing Broadway productions of Ferenc Molnár's The Devil (1908)

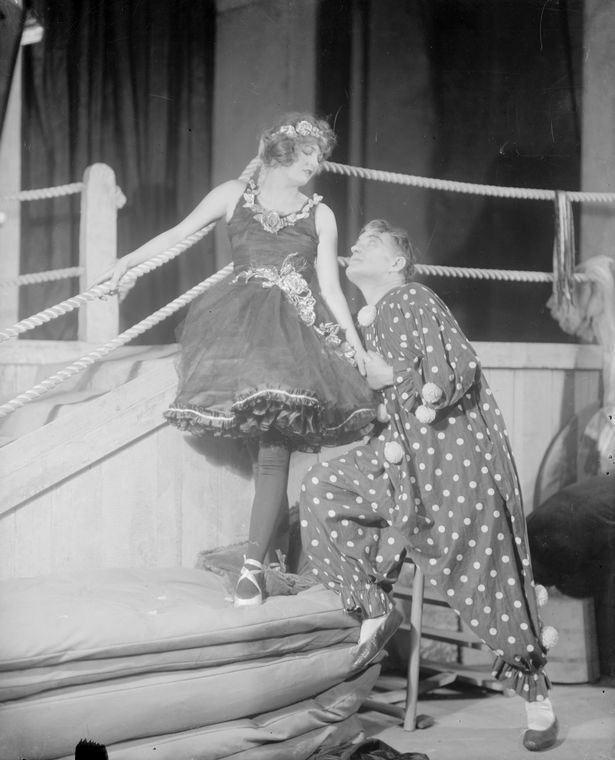
Margalo Gillmore and Richard Bennett in the Theatre Guild production of Leonid Andreyev's He Who Gets Slapped (1922)

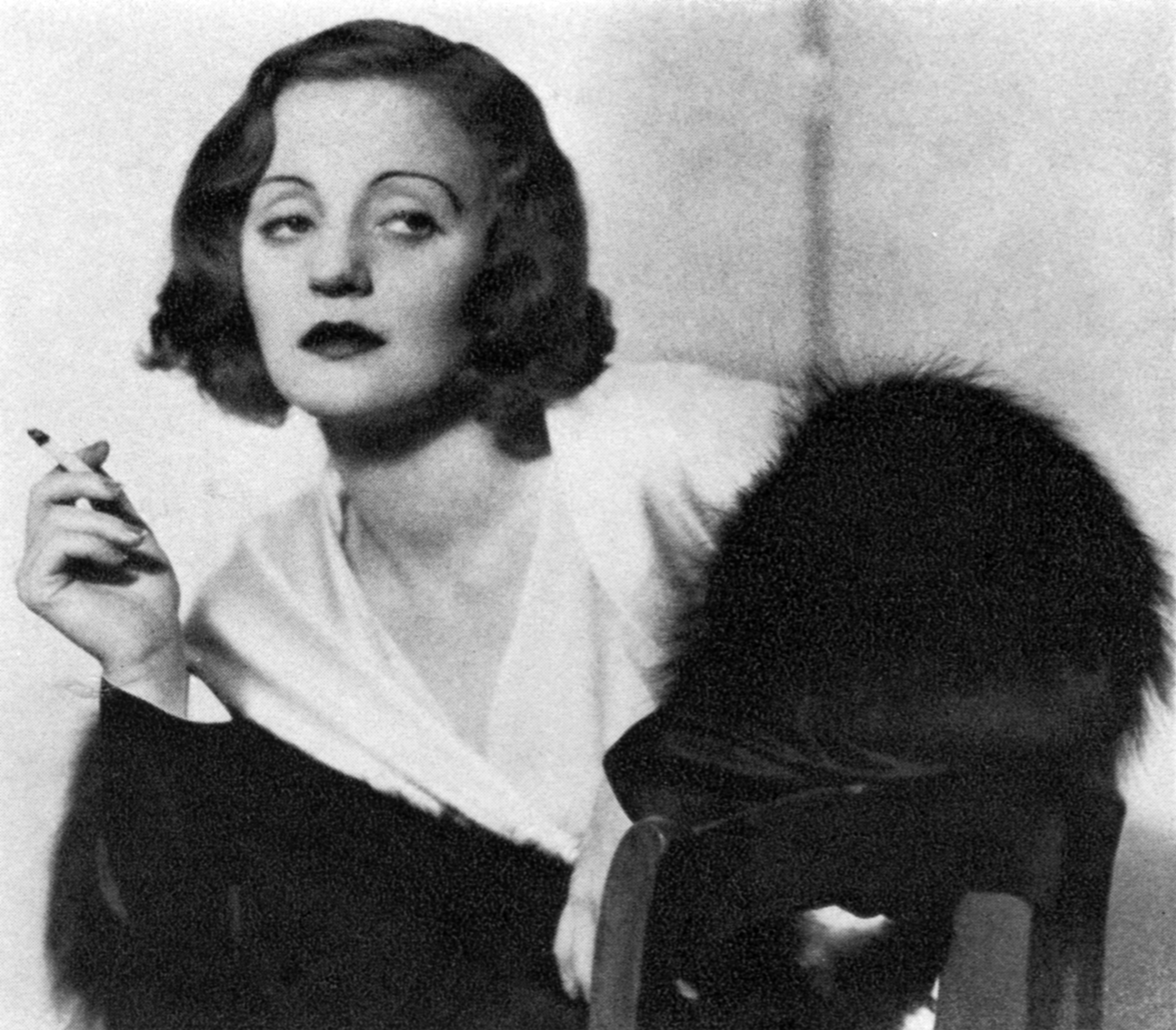
Tallulah Bankhead in Dark Victory (1934)

Date	Title	Notes
August 18 – November 1908	The Devil	Garden Theatre, New York City
November 1912	Bachelors and Benedicts	Criterion Theatre, New York City
December 22, 1913 – February 1914	The New Henrietta	Knickerbocker Theatre, New York City
January 25 – February 27, 1915	90 in the Shade	Knickerbocker Theatre, New York City
August 27 – October 2, 1915	Cousin Lucy	George M. Cohan's Theatre, New York City
October 5 – November 13, 1915	Miss Information	George M. Cohan's Theatre, New York City
February 1 – August 10, 1918	Oh, Lady! Lady!!	Princess Theatre + Casino Theatre, New York City
November 27, 1918 – May 10, 1919	Oh, My Dear!	Princess Theatre + 39th Street Theatre, New York City
July 8 – September 1919	The Five Million	Lyric Theatre, New York City
September 13, 1919 – May 29, 1920	Adam and Eva	Longacre Theatre, New York City
November 25, 1919 – January 1920	The Rose of China	Lyric Theatre, New York City
July 31 – October 1920	Crooked Gamblers	Hudson Theatre, New York City
August 2 – October 1920	The Charm School	Bijou Theatre, New York City
October 11 – November 1920	The Unwritten Chapter	Astor Theatre, New York City
September 19, 1921 – February 1922	Bluebeard's Eighth Wife	Ritz Theatre, New York City
January 9 – June 1922	He Who Gets Slapped	Garrick Theatre, New York City
February 15 – March 1922	Madame Pierre	Ritz Theatre, New York City
August 24 – September 1922	A Serpent's Tooth	Little Theatre, New York City
September 20 – November 1922	Banco	Ritz Theatre, New York City
December 25, 1922 – January 1923	The Lady Cristilinda	Broadhurst Theatre, New York City
February 19 – June 1923	You and I	Belmont Theatre, New York City
April 1923	As You Like It	48th Street Theatre, New York City
August 6 – November 1923	In Love With Love	Ritz Theatre, New York City
January 7 – May 1924	Outward Bound	Ritz Theatre, New York City
September 30 – October 1924	The Far Cry	Cort Theatre, New York City
December 22, 1924 – March 23, 1925	The Youngest	Gaiety Theatre, New York City
November 7 – December 1934	Dark Victory	Plymouth Theatre, New York City
November 9, 1936 – March 1937	Black Limelight	Mansfield Theatre, New York City
March 28 – April 30, 1938	The Seagull	Shubert Theatre, New York City

== Filmography ==
=== Director ===
Year	Title	Notes
1929	The Dummy	
1929	Charming Sinners	
1930	Behind the Make-Up	
1930	Outward Bound	
1931	The Bargain	
1931	Devotion	
1931	Husband's Holiday	
1932	Westward Passage	
1933	Strange Evidence	
1933	Bella Donna	
1933	The Luck of a Sailor	

=== Screenwriter ===
Year	Title	Notes
1921	The Land of Hope	
1930	Sin Takes a Holiday	
1931	The Lady Refuses	

== Bibliography ==
- Goble, Alan. The Complete Index to Literary Sources in Film. Walter de Gruyter, 1999.
