= The Greeks Had a Word for Them =

1932 American comedy film

- Theatrical release poster
- Directed by: Lowell Sherman
- Screenplay by: Sidney Howard
- Based on: The Greeks Had a Word for It by Zoe Akins
- Produced by: Samuel Goldwyn
- Starring: Ina Claire; Joan Blondell; Madge Evans; Lowell Sherman; David Manners
- Cinematography: George Barnes
- Edited by: Stuart Heisler
- Music by: Alfred Newman
- Production company: Samuel Goldwyn Productions
- Distributed by: United Artists
- Release date: February 3, 1932 (United States)
- Running time: 79 minutes
- Country: United States
- Language: English

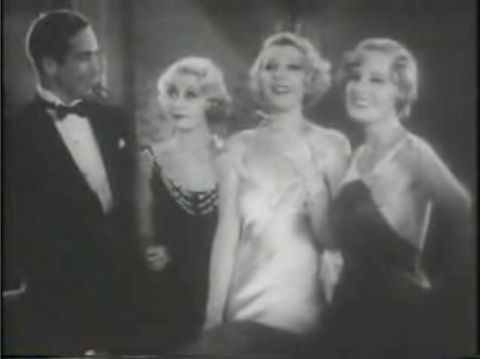
David Manners, Joan Blondell, Ina Claire, Madge Evans

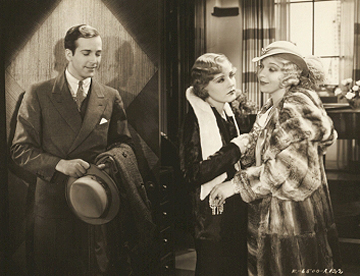
David Manners, Madge Evans, Ina Claire

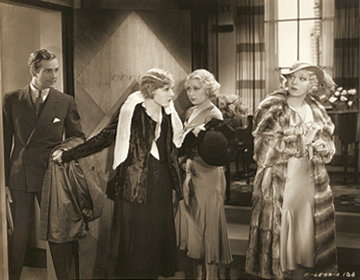
David Manners, Madge Evans, Joan Blondell, Ina Claire

The Greeks Had a Word for Them

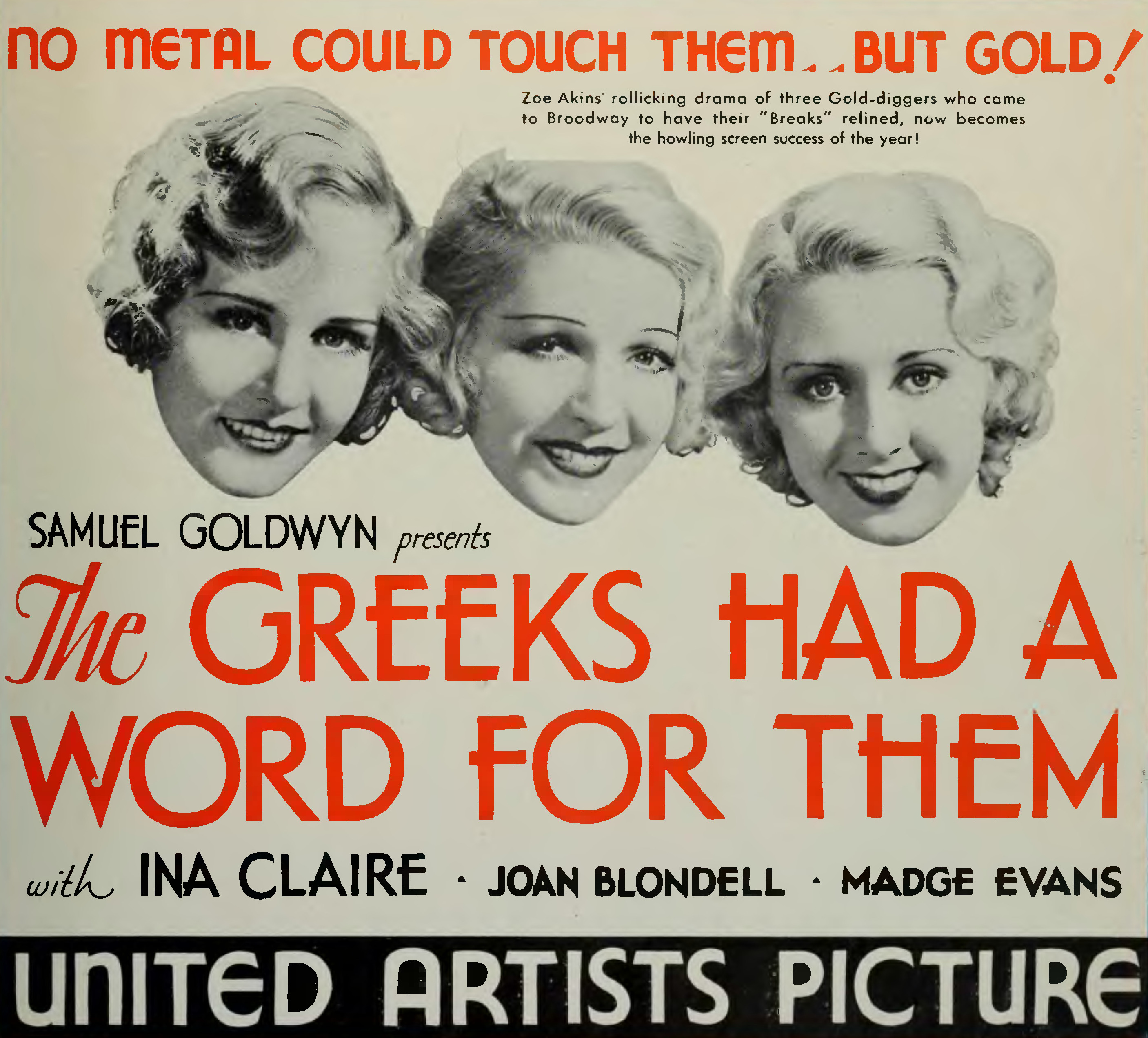
The Greeks Had a Word for Them ad in The Film Daily, 1932

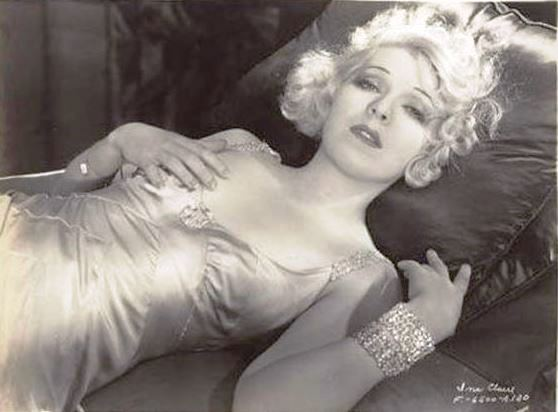
1932 promotional image of Ina Claire for the film

The Greeks Had a Word for Them (also known as Three Broadway Girls) is a 1932 American pre-Code comedy film directed by Lowell Sherman, produced by Samuel Goldwyn, and released by United Artists. It stars Ina Claire, Joan Blondell, and Madge Evans and is based on the play The Greeks Had a Word for It by Zoe Akins. The studio originally wanted actress Jean Harlow for the lead after her success in Public Enemy (1931), but she was under contract to Howard Hughes, and he refused to loan her out. The film served as inspiration for films such as Three Blind Mice (1938), Moon Over Miami (1941), and How to Marry a Millionaire (1953). Ladies in Love (1936) also has a similar pattern and was produced like "Three Blind Mice" by Darryl F. Zanuck.

== Plot ==
Jean, Polaire, and Schatzi are former showgirls who put their money together in order to rent a luxurious penthouse apartment. Jean is on her way back from France after a failed engagement which left her penniless. She manipulates a fellow male ship passenger into paying her dining bill, claiming that she can't find her checkbook. After she returns home the girls scheme to get Jean engaged again, Jean suggests an old flame named Pops (whom the audience never sees), but she is surprised to find that Schatzi is now engaged to him. Polaire loans Jean her "bad dime" bracelet which has brought her good luck (the dime has a hole in it). Polaire phones Dey Emery to arrange a party for that night and asks him to set Jean up with a date for the evening. Later at a nightclub, Dey introduces Jean to pianist Boris Feldman, but she doesn't like him. Boris bets Jean that he can make her fall in love with him just by playing the piano for her, $5,000 if she doesn't fall in love with him, "everything" if she does.

Later that night the group go to Boris' apartment where Polaire plays piano and Boris falls in love with her, forgetting the arrangement he made with Jean. He proposes to make Polaire his protégé, and she agrees to come back to his apartment in ten minutes after she gets her things. Meanwhile, Jean has taken off her dress, put on her coat and hides upstairs until Polaire leaves. She schemes to make Boris her own by seducing him. Polaire returns after ten minutes but it is too late, Boris is too busy to answer the door. After leaving Boris' apartment, Polaire is involved in a bad car accident when her taxi driver collides with a milk truck, and she is hospitalized.

Some time passes, Boris is upset that Jean slept through his concert performance and she breaks it off with him, telling him she sleeps when she wants to. Later Schatzi runs into Jean at a salon, Dey and Jean have been seeing each other and he arrives to pick her up. Schatzi pulls Dey into another room and tells him about Polaire's car accident and he goes to her hospital room and they reunite.

Schatzi discovers that her fiancé, Pops, has died. Schatzi and Polaire go to Pops' will reading and discover that Jean is also there dressed head to toe in mourning clothes and feigns grief. The lawyer plays a recording of Pops' own voice recognizing Schatzi as his heiress and warning that Jean may be scheming for his assets.

Later, Schatzi and Polaire are living in a fancy hotel when Jean phones saying she will visit at 3 o'clock. Polaire hires the hotel waiter to be their butler for only a half hour at 3 o'clock. Jean doesn't fall for it. Dey phones Polaire to say he and his father are coming over to meet her, she asks Jean to leave but she refuses. Jean hides her gloves under a pillow but Polaire is wise to it and makes sure she leaves with all her things so she doesn't need to stop by while Dey and his father are there. Jean tries to give Polaire her pearls but she refuses to accept them, Jean puts them in Polaire's coat pocket anyway. Dey arrives to take Polaire to meet his father but Jean rushes to the Emery residence to scheme for a husband, and accuses Polaire of stealing her pearls. Dey's father insists that his son call off his wedding to Polaire, and the father gets engaged to Jean.

Schatzi and Polaire arrive at Jean's wedding and Jean finally returns the bad dime bracelet to Polaire. The two girls discover that Jean now has a million dollars, they get Jean drunk and convince her to run off with them to Paris instead of getting married. Dey follows the three girls and catches up with them before their ship sails, and he and Polaire are reunited.

== Cast ==
- Joan Blondell as Schatzi
- Madge Evans as Polaire
- Ina Claire as Jean Lawrence
- David Manners as Dey Emery
- Lowell Sherman as Boris Feldman
- Phillips Smalley as Justin Emery
- Sidney Bracey as the waiter
- Ward Bond as taxi driver

== Production ==
This film was one of only three films that Coco Chanel designed costumes for, the other two were Palmy Days and Tonight or Never. Chanel designed thirty outfits for the film, including Ina Claire's beach pajamas. The 'word' referred to in the title is hetaira, a high-class prostitute and companion in Ancient Greece.

== See also ==
- Pre-Code sex films
