= George Middleton (playwright) =

American dramatist

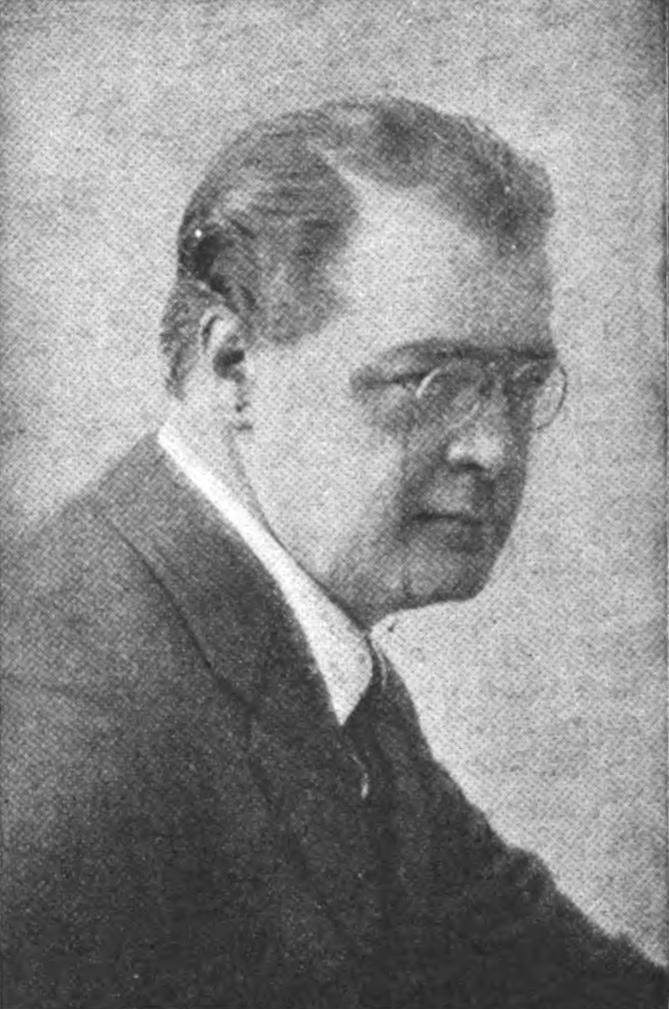
George Middleton c. 1920

George Middleton (October 27, 1880, in Paterson, New Jersey – December 23, 1967, in Washington, D.C.) was an American playwright, director, and producer.

== Career ==
In 1902 George Middleton first had his work produced professionally when he worked on the stage adaptation of The Cavalier with Paul Kester and the novel's author, George W. Cable. In 1911 he published Embers: And Other One-Act Plays; it was among the earliest such collections published by an American. Middleton authored many one-act plays and was a known proponent of the form.

He collaborated with Guy Bolton several times. The comedy Polly With a Past (1917) was one of their successes, running for 315 performances and making a star of Ina Claire. A film adaptation was made in 1920, and in 1929 the stage musical Polly was based on it. In 1919 they had another success with Adam and Eva, selected by theater critic Burns Mantle as one of the best plays of 1919–1920. This play was also made into a film.

In addition to his original work, Middleton also translated French plays, and dramatized novels.

He was an early crusader for the rights of playwrights and was instrumental in the creation of the Minimum Basic Agreement and the subsequent 1926 battle to get theatrical managers to agree to its terms.

From 1927 to 1929 he was president of the Dramatists Guild of America. In 1947, he published a well-reviewed memoir, These Things are Mine.

== Personal ==
Middleton graduated from Columbia University in 1902.

On October 29, 1911, Middleton married actress and suffragette Flora Dodge 'Fola' La Follette, the oldest child of U.S. Senator Robert Marion La Follette, Sr. of Wisconsin and Belle Case La Follette. His wife was the inspiration for his one-act play Tradition.
