= Polly with a Past (film) =

1920 film by Leander de Cordova

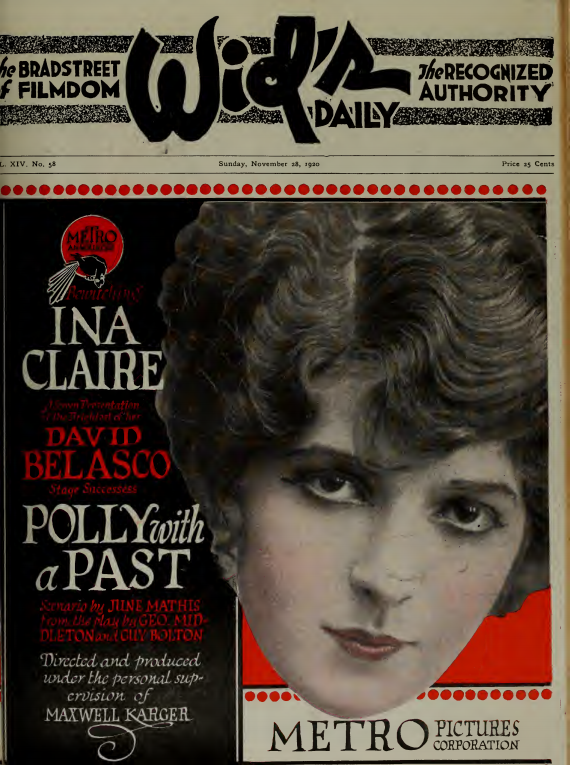
- Advertisement
- Directed by: Leander de Cordova
- Screenplay by: June Mathis; Arthur J. Zellner
- Based on: Polly With a Past, a 1917 play by Guy Bolton and George Middleton
- Produced by: Maxwell Karger
- Starring: Ina Claire
- Cinematography: Arthur Martinelli
- Production company: Metro Pictures
- Distributed by: Metro Pictures
- Release date: November 29, 1920
- Running time: 6 reels
- Country: United States
- Language: Silent (English intertitles)

Polly with a Past is a 1920 American silent drama film produced and distributed by Metro Pictures and directed by Leander de Cordova. Based on a 1917 Broadway stage play of the same name, the film starred Ina Claire, reprising her stage role in the title role of Polly. Clifton Webb had an early unbilled screen appearance in this film.

As with many Metro Pictures productions from the period from the late 1910s to the early 1920s, this film is presumed lost.

== Plot ==
Minister's daughter Polly Shannon, in order to earn money go to Paris and study opera, takes a job as a maid for Clay Cullum and Harry Richardson. Cullum and Richardson are friends with shy Rex Van Zile, whose love for do-gooder Myrtle Davis is unrequited. The three friends and Polly come up with a scheme to get Myrtle to notice Rex. Polly poses as a French adventuress "with a past" who pursues Rex. Their plan is to inspire Myrtle to save Rex from the bad woman.

Complications ensue, and in the end Rex and Polly fall in love.

== Cast ==
- Ina Claire as Polly Shannon
- Ralph Graves as Rex Van Zile
- Marie Wainwright as Mrs. Van Zile
- Harry Benham as Clay Cullum
- Clifton Webb as Harry Richardson
- Louiszita Valentine as Myrtle Davis
- Myra Brooks as the cook
- Frank Currier

== Production ==
In December 1919, Metro acquired the play Polly With a Past (1917) from Guy Bolton and George Middleton for $75,000, reputedly the highest price paid for a stage story to that time. Its purchase reflected Metro's efforts to obtain stories that were already well-known and popular. From the start, Ina Claire, who had played Polly on the stage, was intended to star in the film version.

June Mathis began work on the script in June 1920. Location scouting trips to Long Island were reported in August. Interiors were filmed at the Metro studios in New York; two Long Island estates provided exteriors. By the end of September shooting was finished.
