= Ruth Shepley =

American stage actress

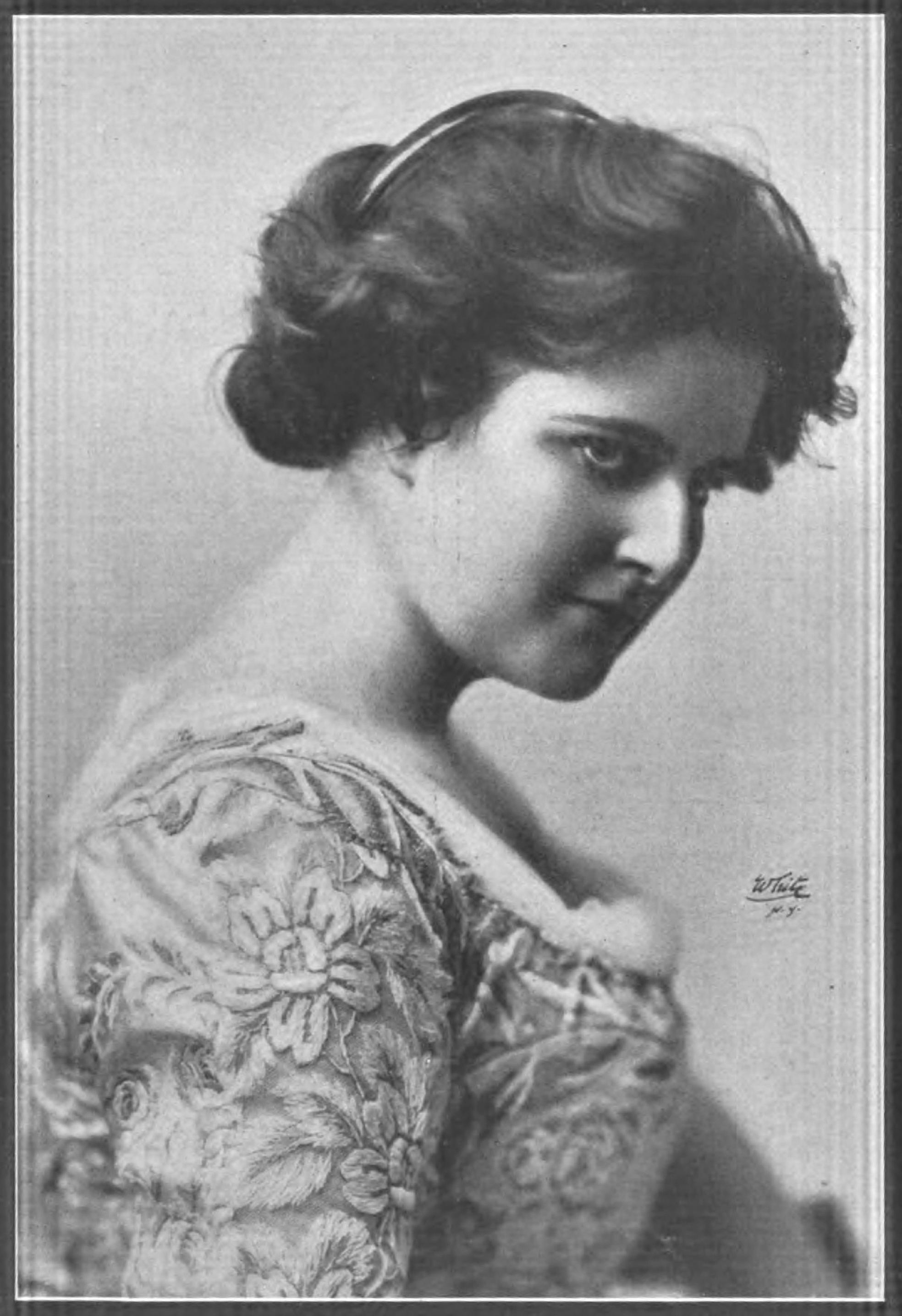
- Shepley, c. 1909
- Born: Ruth Shepley; May 29, 1892; Providence, Rhode Island U.S.
- Died: October 16, 1951 (aged 59); Greenwich, Connecticut
- Occupation: Stage actress
- Years active: 1908–1939
- Spouses: Gordon Sarre (m. 1920; dissolved 1932) Beverly C. Smith (m. 1932)

Ruth Shepley (May 29, 1892 - October 16, 1951) was an American stage actress from Providence, Rhode Island who appeared in comedies such as It Pays to Advertise (1914). A Broadway performer, she was trim, with blonde hair, and medium height. She was educated in Paris. Shepley was a close friend of Helen Hayes and Douglas Fairbanks Sr.

== Acting career ==
Shepley's debut as an actress came in 1908 at the Bijou Theatre. She appeared in All For A Girl. Subsequent performances at the same venue included acting in A Gentleman of Leisure (1911), The Brute (1912), The Fatted Calf (1912), Nearly Married (1913), and It Pays To Advertise (1914). Quite a few of her early stage work came under the management of David Belasco and George M. Cohan.

Her most noted production was The Boomerang (1915) in which Shepley played the part of Grace Tyler at the Belasco Theatre. She was the leading woman for Adam and Eva, which ran the entire 1919-1920 season on Broadway. In 1921 Shepley appeared at the Cort Theatre in Her Salary Man. The following year she made her first London performance in Lawful Larceny. Her final work as an actress came with Helen Hayes in Ladies and Gentlemen (1939), a production staged in Santa Barbara, California.

During World War I Shepley was a captain in the American Women's Voluntary Services. In World War II she was featured in an eight-month tour of the Pacific Rim in Dear Ruth. The entertainment was under the auspices of the United Services Organization.

== Personal life ==
Shepley married Gordon Sarre in 1920, a union which was dissolved in 1932. She was survived by her second husband, the New York surgeon Dr. Beverly C. Smith, whom she married in 1932.

She lived at 28 East 73rd Street in New York City and at Greenwich, Connecticut.

== Filmography ==
Year	Film	Role	Director	Notes
1915	Alias Jimmy Valentine	Rose Fay	Maurice Tourneur	Silent
1916	Admirers Three	Peggy		Silent; Short
1922	When Knighthood Was in Flower	Lady Jane Bolingbroke	Robert G. Vignola	Silent
