= The Bargain (1931 film) =

1931 film

- Theatrical poster
- Directed by: Robert Milton
- Screenplay by: Robert Presnell Sr.
- Based on: You and I 1923 play by Philip Barry
- Starring: Lewis Stone; Evalyn Knapp; Charles Butterworth; Doris Kenyon
- Cinematography: Sol Polito
- Edited by: Jack Rawlins
- Music by: David Mendoza
- Distributed by: First National Pictures: A Subsidiary of Warner Bros. Pictures
- Release date: September 5, 1931 (U.S.)
- Running time: 68 minutes
- Country: United States
- Language: English

The Bargain is a 1931 American pre-Code comedy drama film produced and released by First National Pictures, a subsidiary of Warner Bros. Pictures, and directed by Robert Milton. The movie stars Lewis Stone, Evalyn Knapp, Charles Butterworth and Doris Kenyon. It was based on the 1923 play, You and I, by Philip Barry.

== Cast ==
- Lewis Stone as Maitland White
- Evalyn Knapp as Vorencia
- Charles Butterworth as Geoffrey
- Doris Kenyon as Nancy
- John Darrow as Roderick White
- Oscar Apfel as G.T. Warren
- Una Merkel as Etta
- Nella Walker as The Patroness

== Preservation ==
A print of four reels including 6084 feet of total footage survive at the BFI National Archive. The soundtrack, which was recorded on Vitaphone disks, may survive in private hands.
