= Polly with a Past (play) =

Play by George Middleton and Guy Bolton

Uncle Prentice Van Zile talks to "Paulette" (Polly), Broadway, 1917

Polly with a Past is a play by George Middleton and Guy Bolton. A comedy in three acts, it depicts the efforts of two young men to help a shy friend, Rex, win the attention of the aloof woman he loves; they arrange for their young housekeeper, Polly, to pose as a glamorous French rival for Rex's affections, but this leads to romantic complications.

The play opened on Broadway in 1917 with a cast headed by Ina Claire as Polly and Herbert Yost as Rex, with Winifred Fraser, H. Reeves-Smith, Thomas Reynolds and Cyril Scott in other roles. It ran for nearly a year at the Belasco Theatre. The piece was presented in London in 1921 starring Edna Best and Donald Calthrop, with a supporting cast including Noël Coward, Edith Evans, Henry Kendall, Claude Rains and C. Aubrey Smith, running for three months. It was adapted for film in 1920 and a musical version played on Broadway in 1929.

== Background and original productions ==
George Middleton was an American playwright, director and producer. Guy Bolton was an English playwright and writer of musical comedies who worked mainly in the US. They collaborated on ten shows, of which the most enduring was Polly With a Past.

The play, written in 1916, was staged the following year by David Belasco. It was given a tryout at Long Branch, New Jersey, starting on September 1, 1917, before opening on September 6 at Broadway's Belasco Theatre, where it ran for 326 performances. In 1921, Gilbert Miller staged the piece in London at the St James's Theatre, where it ran from March 2 to June 4.

== Roles and original casts ==
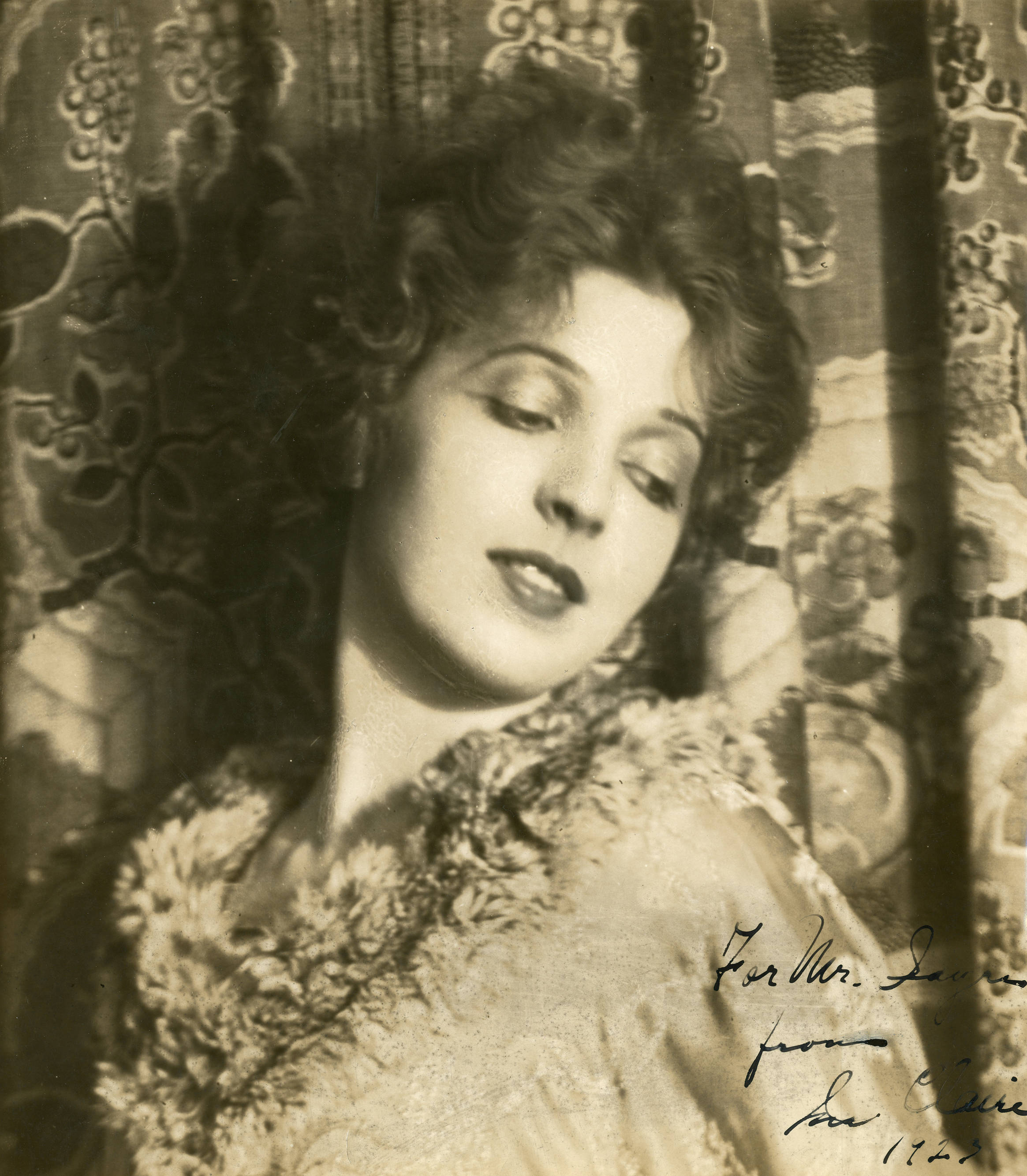
Ina Claire as Polly in the original Broadway production

	New York	London
Clay Collum	George Stuart Christie	Noël Coward
Harry Richardson	Cyril Scott	Henry Kendall
Polly Shannon	Ina Claire	Edna Best
Rex Van Zile	Herbert Yost	Donald Calthrop
Mrs Davis	Louise Galloway	Helen Haye
Myrtle Davis	Anne Meredith	Alice Moffat
Stiles	William Sampson	Arthur Hatherton
Mrs Van Zile, Rex's mother	Winifred Fraser	Edith Evans
Commodore Bob Barker	Thomas Reynolds	Paul Arthur
Parker, maid	Mildred Dean	Nancye Kenyon
Prentice Van Zile, Rex's uncle	H. Reeves-Smith	C. Aubrey Smith
A stranger	Robert Fischer	Claude Rains

== Plot ==
From left: Noël Coward, Donald Calthrop, Edna Best, Edith Evans, Henry Kendall, London, 1921

Polly Shannon, the orphaned daughter of a Methodist minister, has come to New York hoping to take music lessons and become a singer. To earn a living, she takes a job as a housekeeper, working for Clay Collum and Harry Richardson, two young men who share an apartment. They have a shy young friend, Rex Van Zile, who is in love with a young woman named Myrtle Davis. She is too distracted by her zealous good works saving people fallen from grace to notice Rex's devotion. Polly suggests to the three young men that if Rex seems threatened with social or moral ruin, Myrtle will immediately rush to his side. Polly recommends finding a suitable young woman to pose as a glamorous temptress with whom Rex should appear to be madly infatuated. When they find out that Polly's mother was French, and that she speaks the language quite well, the three young men offer to pay for her music lessons if she plays the role of the exotic enchantress. Polly agrees.

At the Van Ziles' summer home on Long Island, a month later, Polly is now posing as "Paulette", a French international heart-breaker. Clay and Harry have done a good job to talk up her reputation as a femme fatale, and they hatch the idea that Rex should "rescue" her from drowning – a suitably romantic touch. After this, gossip does the rest. Polite society is appalled. Myrtle decides that she must try to save Rex, but by this time Rex has realized he does not want to be saved: he truly loves Polly, and after a series of complications he gets his way, and they become engaged to be married.

== Critical reception ==
In his review for The Evening World, Charles Darnton, called the play "a refreshing comedy with an ideal cast. … It doesn't matter if the general scheme is a bit farcical. The authors are to be credited with uncommon humor and ingenuity". The Brooklyn Daily Eagle judged it "an amusing and wholesome little play".

When the play was presented in London, The Times commented that the outcome of the plot was predictable and that the action was slow. In The Observer, St John Ervine termed the play "unpretentious and agreeable", slow at the beginning but gathering pace, and "constructed … with considerable ingenuity".

== Adaptations ==
A silent movie was made of the play in 1920. Ina Claire as Polly was the only member of the stage cast to appear in the film.

In 1928, Middleton and Bolton collaborated with Herbert Stothart and Phil Charig (music) and Irving Caesar (lyrics) on a musical adaptation of the play, given the title Polly. In the pre-Broadway tryout in Wilmington, Delaware, the role of Rex Van Zile was played by Archie Leach, who later became known as Cary Grant. Also in the cast were Fred Allen (in a newly created part – a press reporter) and June Tripp in the title role. Leach was replaced as Rex by John Hundley for the Broadway run, which opened at the Lyric Theatre on January 8, 1929, and closed on January 19 after 15 performances.

== References and sources ==
=== Sources ===
- Middleton, George; Guy Bolton (1923). Polly With a Past. New York and London: Samuel French. OCLC 314957153.
