= Ina Claire =

American stage and film actress (1893–1985)

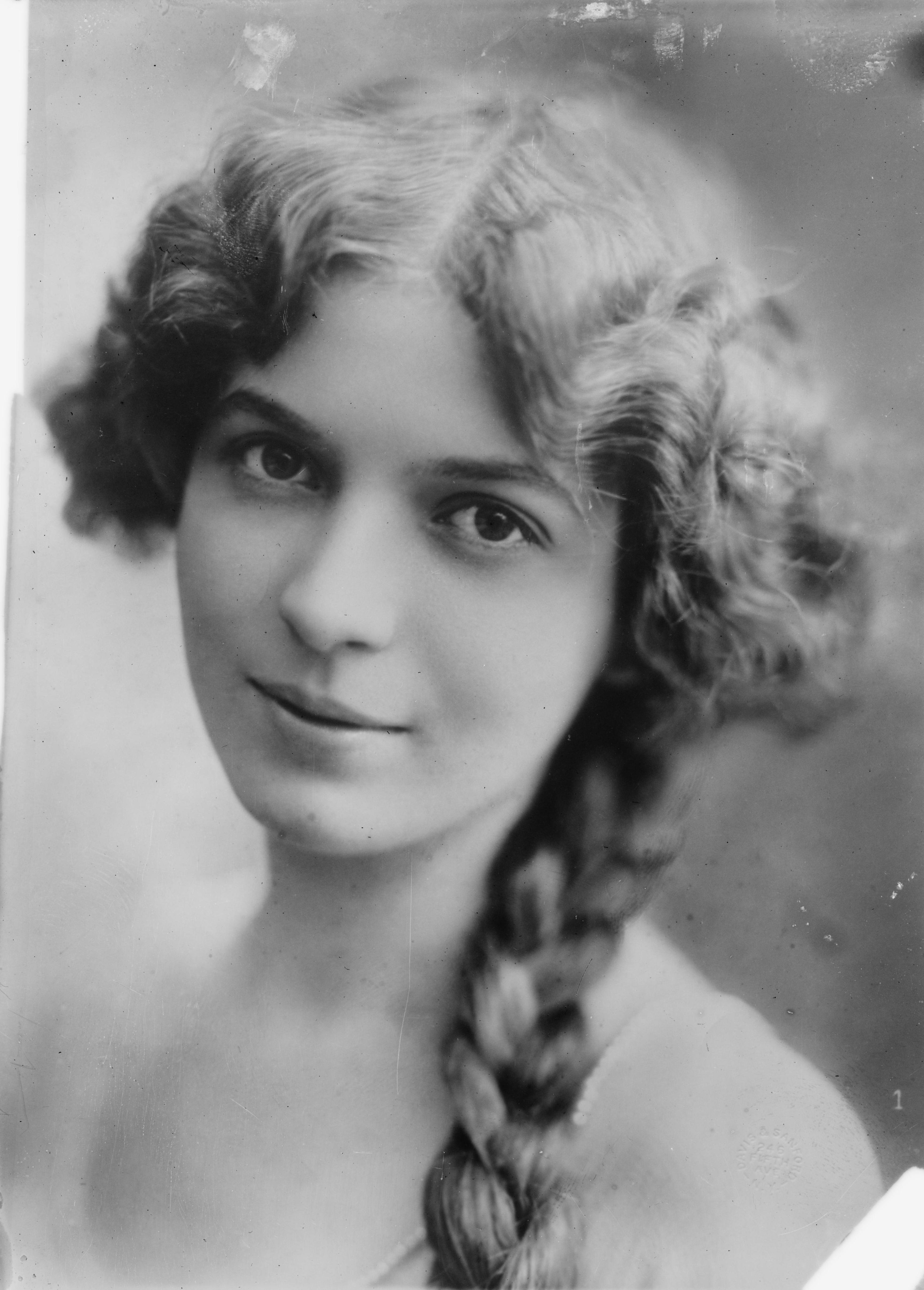
- Born: Ina Fagan; October 15, 1893; Washington, D.C., U.S.
- Died: February 21, 1985 (aged 91); San Francisco, California, U.S.
- Resting place: Mount Olivet Cemetery
- Occupation: Actress
- Years active: 1909–1954
- Spouses: James Whittaker (m. 1919; div. 1925) John Gilbert (m. 1929; div. 1931) William R. Wallace (m. 1939; died 1976)

Ina Claire (born Ina Fagan; October 15, 1893 – February 21, 1985) was an American stage and film actress.

== Early years ==
Ina Fagan was born October 15, 1893, in Washington, D.C. After the death of her father, Claire began doing imitations of fellow boarders in the boarding house where she and her mother, Cora, and brother, Allen, lived. Claire's mother took her out of school in the eighth grade, and she used her mother's maiden name when she began her career appearing in vaudeville. In 1906, she gave a recitation as the grand finale of a program presented by Miss Cora B. Shreve's pupils in Washington, D.C. She was identified in a newspaper article as Ina Claire Fagan.

== Career ==
Claire made her professional stage debut in October 1907 in Elmira, New York. She played Florie in a production of The Fatal Flower — the beginning of a two-year contract.

In 1909, she appeared in a vaudeville act entitled "Dainty Mimic", which included an imitation of actor Harry Lauder. A booking agent described this act as "one of the best single Acts" he had seen that season and remarked that "She possesses a great deal of magnatism [sic] and is a big hit."

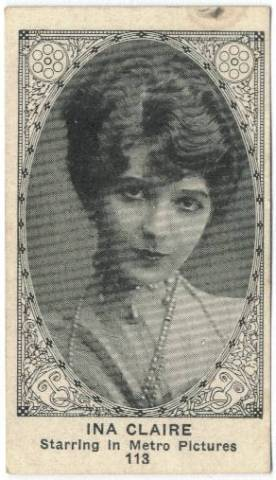
Ina Clare pictured on a movie card (1922)

She performed on Broadway in the musicals Jumping Jupiter, The Quaker Girl (both 1911), and Lady Luxury (1914-1915). Claire was in the Ziegfeld Follies of 1915 and 1916. She later starred on Broadway in plays by some of the leading comic dramatists of the 1920s, 1930s, and 1940s, including the roles of Jerry Lamarr in Avery Hopwood's The Gold Diggers (1919), Mrs. Cheyney in Frederick Lonsdale's The Last of Mrs. Cheyney (1925), Lady George Grayston in W. Somerset Maugham's Our Betters (1928), and Enid Fuller in George Kelly's Fatal Weakness.

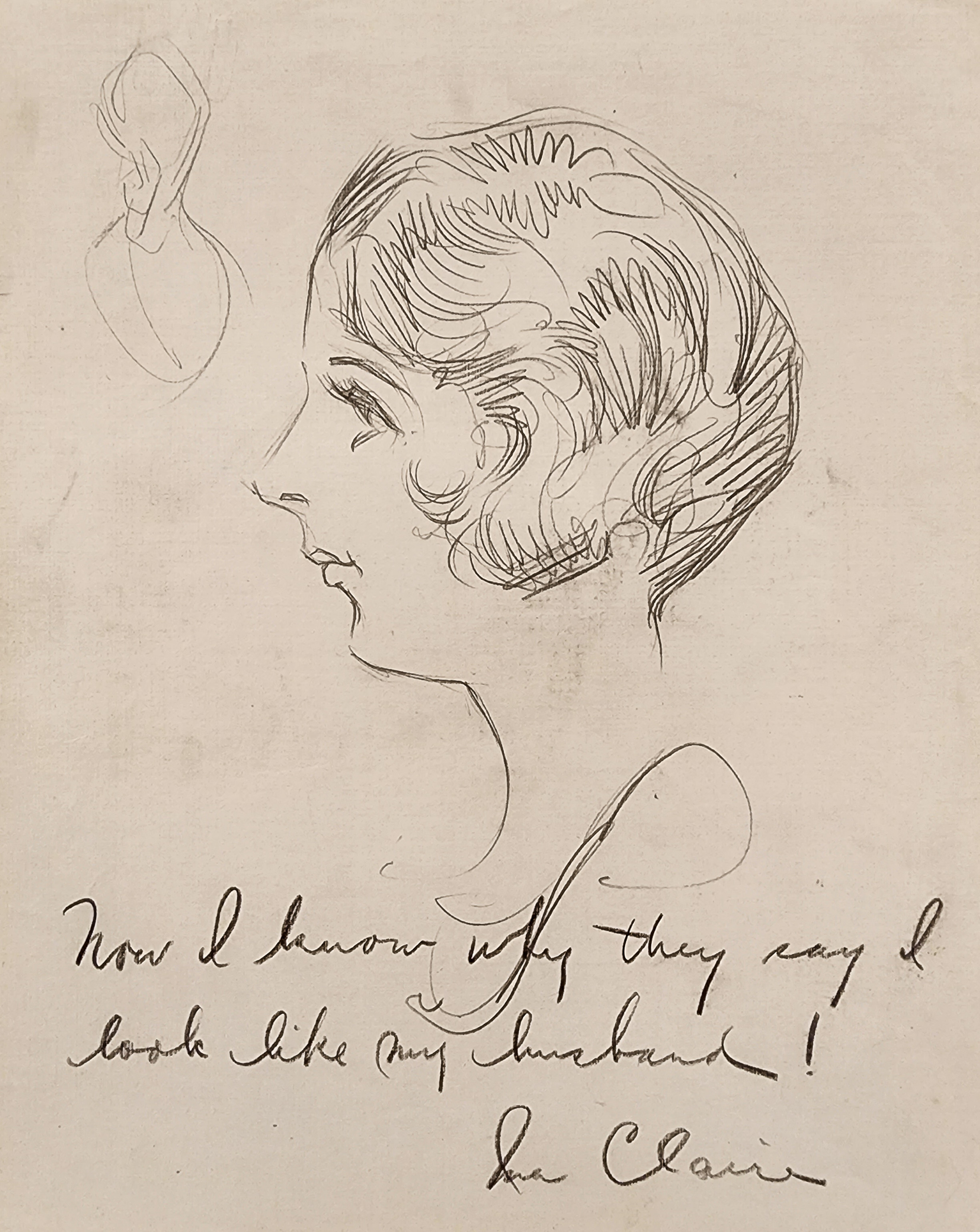
Signed sketch of Ina Claire by Manuel Rosenberg 1924

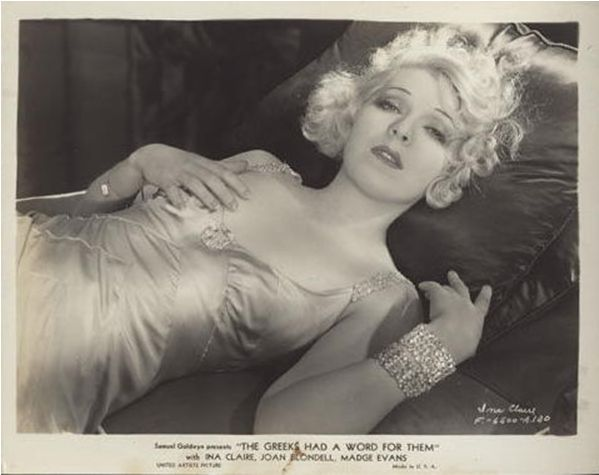
Ina Claire in a pre-code publicity still for The Greeks Had a Word for Them (1932), lying in her evening gown in a seductive pose, which provoked outrage from civic and religious leaders.

Claire later became identified with the high comedies of S. N. Behrman, and created the female leads in three of his plays: Biography (1934), End of Summer (1936), and The Talley Method (1941). Behrman wrote of Claire's performance in one of his comedies: "Her readings were translucent, her stage presence encompassing. The flick of an intonation deflated pomposity. She never missed a nuance." Critic J. Brooks Atkinson praised Claire for her "refulgent comic intelligence".

Claire was retired from the stage for five years in the early 1940s, living with her husband in San Francisco. She returned to perform in the comedy The Fatal Weakness. Her last stage appearance was as Lady Elizabeth Mulhammer in T. S. Eliot's The Confidential Clerk (1954).

She made her film debut in Cecil B. DeMille's The Wild Goose Chase (1915). She is best remembered today for her role as the Grand Duchess Swana in the romantic comedy Ninotchka (1939), directed by Ernst Lubitsch and starring Greta Garbo.

== Death ==
Ina Claire died on February 21, 1985, in San Francisco, California after suffering a heart attack. She was 91 years old. She is buried in Mount Olivet Cemetery located in Salt Lake City. She was an inductee in the American Theater Hall of Fame and has a star on the Hollywood Walk of Fame.

== Filmography ==
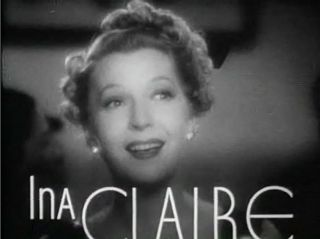
from the trailer for the film Ninotchka (1939)

Year	Title	Role	Notes
1915	The Wild Goose Chase	Betty Wright	Short; Lost film
1915	The Puppet Crown	Princess Alexia	Lost film
1917	National Red Cross Pageant	Jeanne D'Arc - French episode	Lost film
1920	Polly With a Past	Polly Shannon	Lost film
1929	The Awful Truth	Lucy Warriner	Lost film
1930	The Royal Family of Broadway	Julie Cavendish	
1931	Rebound	Sara Jaffrey	
1932	The Greeks Had a Word for Them	Jean Lawrence	
1939	Ninotchka	Grand Duchess Swana	
1940	I Take This Woman	Cesca Marcesca	(scenes deleted)
1943	Claudia	Mrs. Brown	
1943	Stage Door Canteen	Ina Claire	(final film role)
