= Guy Bolton =

Anglo-American playwright (1884–1979)

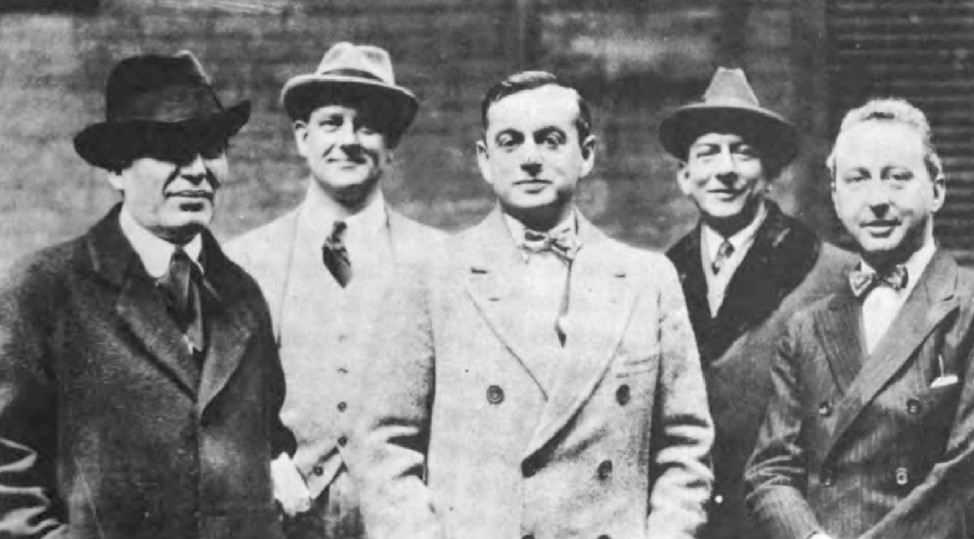
Bolton, centre, with l to r, Morris Gest, P. G. Wodehouse, Ray Comstock and Jerome Kern, c. 1917

Guy Reginald Bolton (23 November 1884 – 4 September 1979) was an Anglo-American playwright and writer of musical comedies. Born in England and educated in France and the US, he trained as an architect but turned to writing. Bolton preferred working in collaboration with others, principally the English writers P. G. Wodehouse and Fred Thompson, with whom he wrote 21 and 14 shows respectively, and the American playwright George Middleton, with whom he wrote ten shows. Among his other collaborators in Britain were George Grossmith Jr., Ian Hay and Weston and Lee. In the US, he worked with George and Ira Gershwin, Kalmar and Ruby and Oscar Hammerstein II.

Bolton is best known for his early work on the Princess Theatre musicals during the First World War with Wodehouse and the composer Jerome Kern. These shows moved the American musical away from the traditions of European operetta to small scale, intimate productions with what the Oxford Encyclopedia of Popular Music calls "smart and witty integrated books and lyrics, considered to be a watershed in the evolution of the American musical." Among his 50 plays and musicals, most of which were considered "frothy confections", additional hits included Primrose (1924), the Gershwins' Lady, Be Good (1924) and especially Cole Porter's Anything Goes (1934).

Bolton also wrote stage adaptations of novels by Henry James and Somerset Maugham, and wrote three novels on his own and a fourth in collaboration with Bernard Newman. He worked on screenplays for such films as Ambassador Bill (1931) and Easter Parade (1948), and published four novels, Flowers for the Living (with Bernard Newman, 1958), The Olympians (1961), The Enchantress (1964) and Gracious Living (1966). With Wodehouse, he wrote a joint memoir of their Broadway years, entitled Bring on the Girls! (1953).

== Biography ==
=== Early years ===
Bolton was born in Broxbourne, Hertfordshire, the elder son of an American engineer, Reginald Pelham Bolton, and his wife Kate (née Behenna). His younger brother, Jamie, died young, leaving Guy and his older sister Ivy. The family moved to the US, settling in New York City's Washington Heights. Bolton studied to be an architect, attending the Pratt Institute School of Architecture and Atelier Masqueray, New York. He also studied at the École des Beaux-Arts, Paris.

Sheet music from Oh, Boy!, an early hit with Kern and Wodehouse

Bolton made early progress in his profession, engaged by the government for special work on the rebuilding of the United States Military Academy at West Point, and helping to design the Soldiers' and Sailors' Monument and the Ansonia Hotel on the Upper West Side of Manhattan, New York City, but was drawn to writing.

=== Early writing career ===
While Bolton was still a student, his stories had been published in magazines. At the age of 26, he wrote his first stage play, The Drone, in collaboration with Douglas J. Wood. His second play, The Rule of Three (1914), was written without a partner, but the following year he embarked on his first musical theatre collaboration, Ninety in the Shade, with music by Jerome Kern, lyrics by Harry B. Smith and book by Bolton, first produced at the Knickerbocker Theatre, New York, on 25 January 1915. The same year, he wrote Hit-the-Trail-Holiday with George M. Cohan. That same year he collaborated with Kern and others on the musicals Nobody Home and the even more successful Very Good Eddie, the first two "Princess Theatre musicals". The latter of the two was also a hit in London.

Bolton quickly became known for his part in moving the American musical away from the European operetta tradition: "No more crown princes masquerading as butlers, no more milkmaids who turn out at the final curtain to be heir to several thrones." Nevertheless, he collaborated with one of operetta's last practitioners, Emmerich Kálmán, in an adaptation of Kálmán's 1915 piece Zsuzsi Kisassony. Miss Springtime, as the American version was called, was produced at the New Amsterdam Theatre in 1916. Bolton wrote the book; the lyrics were by Herbert Reynolds and P. G. Wodehouse, the latter writing with Bolton for the first time in what became a lifelong working partnership and personal friendship. Kern, who already knew Wodehouse, introduced him to Bolton at the premiere of Very Good Eddie. Wodehouse admired Bolton's stagecraft, but thought his lyrics weak, and at Kern's urging they decided to write jointly, Wodehouse concentrating on the lyrics and Bolton on the book.

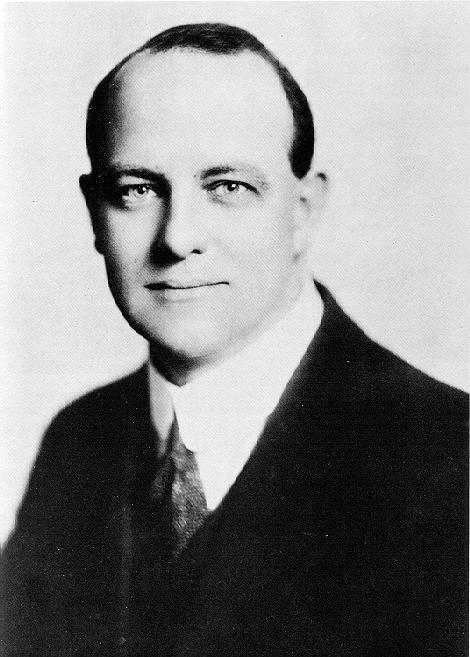
P. G. Wodehouse, Bolton's friend and collaborator

For the Princess Theatre, Bolton and Wodehouse wrote the book and lyrics for Have a Heart (1917), Oh, Boy! (1917), which ran for 463 performances, Leave It to Jane (1917), Oh, Lady! Lady!! (1918), See You Later (1918) and Oh! My Dear (1918). They also collaborated on Miss 1917 (1917) at the Century Theatre, on Bolton's second Kálmán show, The Riviera Girl (1917), and on Kissing Time (1918), the latter two for the New Amsterdam. During these years, Bolton also wrote successful plays with George Middleton and others. But it was the Princess Theatre shows with Kern that made the most impression; some of these shows were so popular that they transferred to the larger Casino Theatre to finish their runs. An anonymous admirer wrote a verse in their praise that begins:

This is the trio of musical fame,
Bolton and Wodehouse and Kern.
Better than anyone else you can name
Bolton and Wodehouse and Kern.

In February 1918, Dorothy Parker wrote in Vanity Fair:

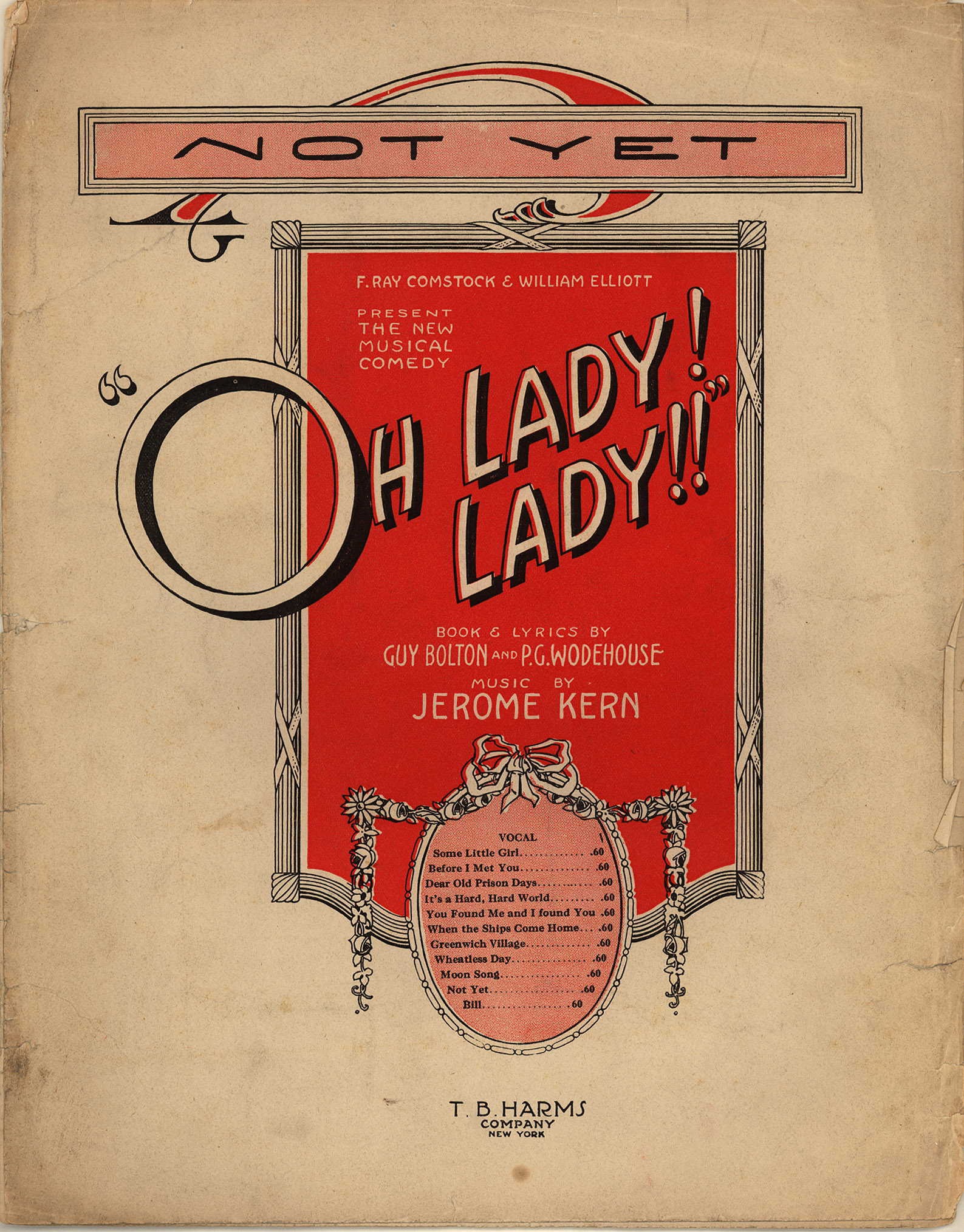
Sheet music from Oh, Lady! Lady!! (1918)

Bolton and Wodehouse and Kern have done it again. Every time these three gather together, the Princess Theatre is sold out for months in advance. You can get a seat for Oh, Lady! Lady!! somewhere around the middle of August for just about the price of one on the stock exchange. If you ask me, I will look you fearlessly in the eye and tell you in low, throbbing tones that it has it over any other musical comedy in town. But then Bolton and Wodehouse and Kern are my favorite indoor sport. I like the way they go about a musical comedy. ... I like the way the action slides casually into the songs. ... I like the deft rhyming of the song that is always sung in the last act by two comedians and a comedienne. And oh, how I do like Jerome Kern's music. And all these things are even more so in Oh, Lady! Lady!! than they were in Oh, Boy!

=== Later writing career ===
Bolton went on to write more than fifty stage works, mainly in collaboration with others. By 1934 he had made twelve shows with Kern and seven with Gershwin. Besides Wodehouse, his frequent writing partners were the American, George Middleton, with whom he wrote ten shows, and the Englishman, Fred Thompson, with whom he wrote fourteen. His collaborations with Middleton were non-musical comic plays, produced with success on both sides of the Atlantic. Their Polly With a Past (1917) was a success in both New York and London, where its cast included Edna Best, Noël Coward, Edith Evans, Claude Rains and C. Aubrey Smith. Their Adam and Eva was another favourite that was adapted for film and frequently revived by smaller theatres. He adapted a French comedy to create the book for The Hotel Mouse in 1922. With Thompson, he wrote the book for early musicals by George and Ira Gershwin, Lady, Be Good (1925) and Tip-Toes (1926). With the Gershwins and Wodehouse, he wrote Oh, Kay! (1926). Among his other collaborators in Britain were George Grossmith Jr., with whom he worked on Primrose (1924), Ian Hay with whom he co-wrote A Song of Sixpence (1930) with Weston and Lee, who joined him for Give Me a Ring (1933). In the US, he worked with Oscar Hammerstein II on Daffy Dill (1922), and with Kalmar and Ruby on The Ramblers (1926) and She's My Baby (1927). He co-wrote the libretto for Kern's Blue Eyes, which played in London in 1928. An occasional collaborator in later years was "Stephen Powys", a pseudonym of Bolton's fourth wife, Virginia de Lanty (1906–1979). Girl Crazy (1930) was a musical, with songs by the Gershwins, starring Ginger Rogers and featuring the debut of Ethel Merman. It was later adapted by Ken Ludwig as the sensation Crazy for You.

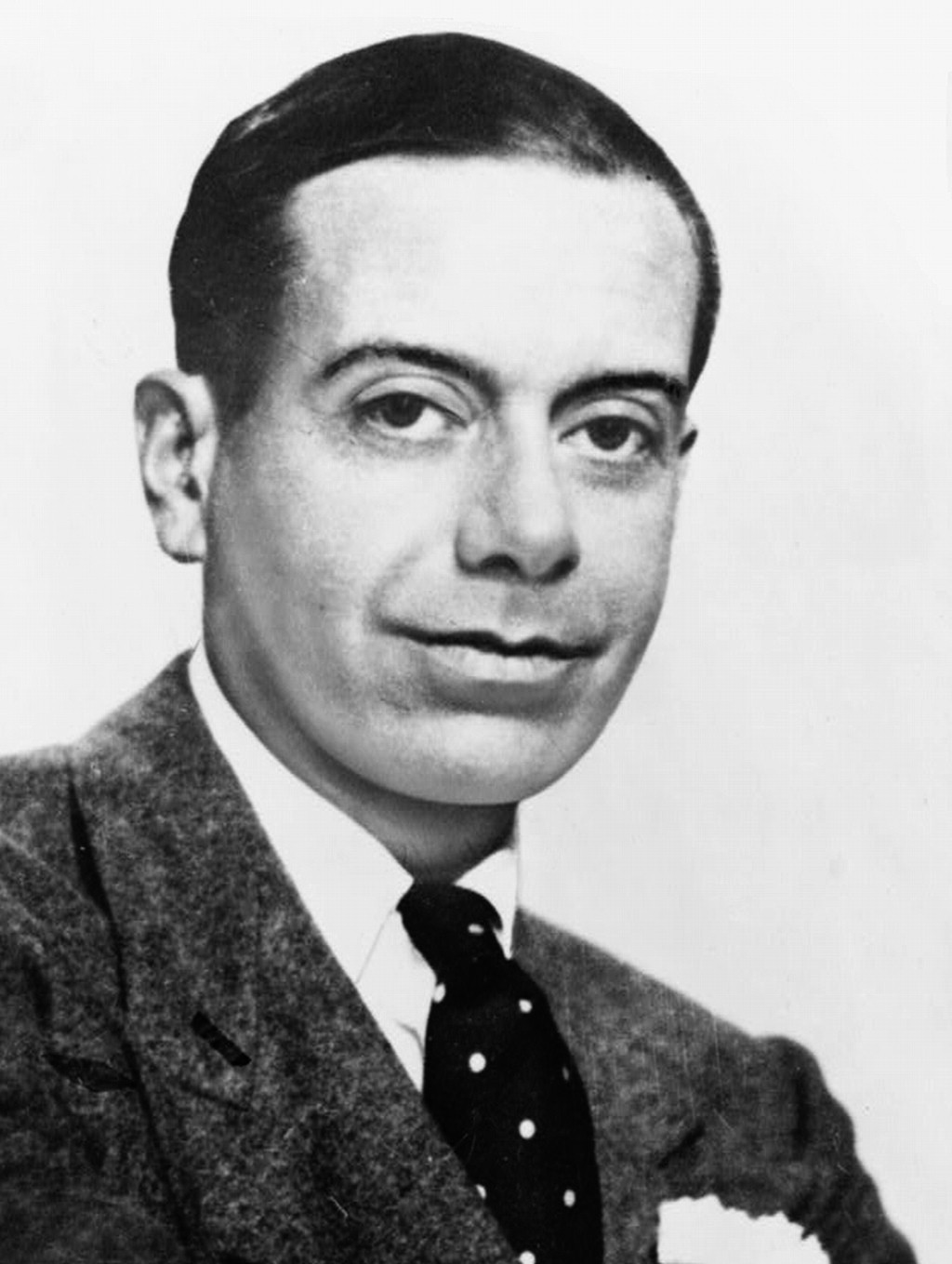
Bolton and Wodehouse wrote the book for Cole Porter's Anything Goes.

During the 1920s and 30s "Bolton worked at a tremendous rate on shows … beautifully constructed, and full of fun and excruciating puns." When the Gershwins began to take a more serious tone, with Of Thee I Sing, Bolton persisted with his "frothy confections" for other composers. He moved to London, where he wrote (or co-wrote, generally with Thompson and sometimes also with Douglas Furber) the book for "a series of highly successful romps" starring London's leading music comedy performers such as Jack Buchanan, Leslie Henson, Bobby Howes, Evelyn Laye and Elsie Randolph, in shows including Song of the Drum (1931), Seeing Stars (1935), At the Silver Swan (1936), This'll Make You Whistle (1935; film version 1936), Swing Along (1936), Going Places (1936), Going Greek (1937), Hide and Seek (1937), The Fleet's Lit Up (1938), Running Riot (1938), Bobby Get Your Gun (1938) and Magyar Melody (1939).

Although Bolton worked mostly in the West End in the 1930s, his biggest hit of the decade began on Broadway, a collaboration with his old friend Wodehouse, who had by then largely abandoned the theatre for novel-writing. When Bolton approached him to co-write the book for Cole Porter's Anything Goes (1934), Wodehouse objected, "Cole does his own lyrics ... What pests these lyric-writing composers are! Taking the bread out of a man's mouth". Still, he agreed to join Bolton in writing the book. The show was, in the words of the Oxford Encyclopedia of Popular Music, "a smash hit" in New York and in London.

Bolton returned to the US during the Second World War to write the librettos for Walk With Music, Hold On to Your Hats, Jackpot (with several contributors) and Follow the Girls (with Eddie Davis). Bolton's screen credits include The Love Parade (1929), Ambassador Bill (1931), Waltzes from Vienna (1934), The Murder Man (1935), Angel (1937), Week-End at the Waldorf (1945), Ziegfeld Follies (1945), Till the Clouds Roll By (1946), Easter Parade (1948) and the German adaptation of his play Adorable Julia (1962). In 1952, he moved away from musicals with an English adaptation of Marcelle Maurette's Anastasia. His last book for Broadway was Anya, a 1967 musical adaptation of Anastasia based on his adaptation and the 1956 film.

With Wodehouse, Bolton wrote the semi-autobiographical book Bring on the Girls!, subtitled, "The Improbable Story of Our Life in Musical Comedy" (1954). It is full of anecdotes about the larger-than-life characters who dominated Broadway between 1915 and 1930, but the biographer Frances Donaldson writes that it is to be read as entertainment rather than reliable history: "Guy, having once invented an anecdote, told it so often that it was impossible to know whether in the end he believed it or not." Other collaborations between the two writers were not acknowledged on title pages or in programmes, but were plays by one turned into novels by the other, or vice versa. Bolton's play, Come On, Jeeves centred on one of Wodehouse's best-known characters; Wodehouse later adapted the play as the novel Ring for Jeeves. Wodehouse's novels French Leave, The Small Bachelor and others were adapted from plots by Bolton.

In his later years, Bolton wrote four novels, Flowers for the Living (with Bernard Newman, 1958), The Olympians (1961), The Enchantress (1964) and Gracious Living, Limited (1966). The Times thought his later non-musical stage work notable, including adaptations of works by Somerset Maugham and Sacha Guitry, and his biographical play The Shelley Story (1947). Another of Bolton's more serious stage works was Child of Fortune (1956), an adaptation of Henry James's The Wings of the Dove.

=== Personal life ===
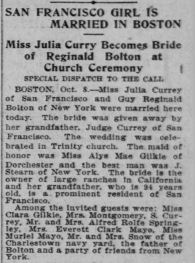

Bolton was "a dapper ladies' man, who, having divorced his first wife, became ensnared in a succession of entanglements with chorus girls and singers." He was married four times. With his first wife, Julia, née Currey, whom he married in 1908, he had one son, Richard M. Bolton (1909–1965) and one daughter, Katherine Louisa "Joan" Bolton (1911–1967). With his second wife, opera singer Marguerite Namara, to whom he was married from 1917 to 1926, he had a daughter, Marguerite Pamela "Peggy" Bolton (1916–2003), who was his only child to outlive him. His third wife was a chorus girl, Marion Redford, whom he married in 1926. Redford had already given birth to Bolton's son, Guy Bolton Jr., known as "Guybo" (1925–1961) before his divorce from Namara. Bolton and Redford divorced in 1932. There were no children of his fourth marriage, to the playwright Virginia de Lanty. This marriage lasted from 1939 until her death in 1979.

Although born of American parents, Bolton was a British subject until 1956, when he took American citizenship. His roots were not deep in any country: like his father, he had a lifelong taste for travelling, and he settled from time to time in European towns and cities including London, but never Paris, which he loathed. His main residences were on Long Island, New York, including Great Neck (at the time of the Princess Theatre shows), and Remsenburg, where he and his wife lived in the years after the Second World War. In 1952, Wodehouse and his wife bought a house two miles away, and for the rest of Wodehouse's life, he and Bolton would go for a daily walk when the latter was not travelling abroad.

Bolton died on a visit to London in 1979, at the age of 94.
