= Bring On the Girls! =

Book by P. G. Wodehouse

- First US Edition
- Author: P. G. Wodehouse and Guy Bolton
- Publisher: Simon & Schuster
- Publication date: 5 October 1953

Bring on the Girls! is a semi-autobiographical collaboration between P. G. Wodehouse and Guy Bolton, first published in the United States on 5 October 1953 by Simon & Schuster, Inc., New York, and in the United Kingdom on 21 May 1954 by Herbert Jenkins, London.

Subtitled "The Improbable Story of Our Life in Musical Comedy, With Pictures To Prove It", it takes the form of a series of partly fictionalised, partly apocryphal stories centred on the world of Broadway, where both Wodehouse and Bolton had worked successfully as lyricists, collaborating with the likes of composer Jerome Kern. It features anecdotes about the larger-than-life characters who dominated Broadway between 1915 and 1930, but the biographer Frances Donaldson writes that it is to be read as entertainment rather than history: "Guy, having once invented an anecdote, told it so often that it was impossible to know whether in the end he believed it or not."

The title of the book refers to adding a chorus ensemble to a dull scene in a musical comedy in order to improve the scene, which, according to the book, is "the panacea that never fails". As stated in the book's opening pages:

Actors might walk through their parts, singers save their voices, but the personnel of the ensemble never failed to go all out, full of pep, energy and the will to win. A hundred shows have been pushed by them over the thin line that divides the floperoo from the socko. It is for this reason that Bolton (Guy) and Wodehouse (P.G.), looking back over their years of toil in the musical comedy salt mines, raise their glasses and without hesitation or heel taps drink this toast: "To the Girls!" And they feel that the least they can do in gratitude for all their hard work is to honor them in the title of this book.

== References and sources ==
=== Sources ===
- Donaldson, Frances (1983). P. G. Wodehouse – The Authorized Biography. London: Futura. ISBN 0-7088-2356-4.
- Wodehouse, P. G.; Bolton, Guy (1984) [1953]. Bring on the Girls!: The Improbable Story of Our Life in Musical Comedy, With Pictures to Prove It (Reprinted ed.). New York: Limelight Editions. ISBN 0-87910-011-7.
