= Zangwill =

Zangwill is a surname. Notable people with the surname include:

- Israel Zangwill (1864–1926), British author
- Louis Zangwill (1869–1938), English novelist, brother of Israel
- Nick Zangwill (born 1957), British philosopher
- Oliver Zangwill (1913–1987), British neuropsychologist, son of Israel
