= The Perfect Crime (1928 film) =

1928 film

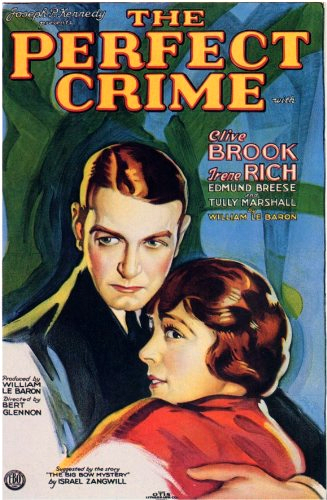
- Directed by: Bert Glennon
- Written by: Ewart Adamson; Randolph Bartlett; Victor Currier; William LeBaron
- Based on: The Big Bow Mystery by Israel Zangwill
- Produced by: William LeBaron
- Starring: Clive Brook; Irene Rich; Ethel Wales
- Cinematography: James Wong Howe
- Edited by: Archie Marshek
- Production company: Film Booking Offices of America
- Distributed by: Film Booking Offices of America; Ideal Films (UK)
- Release date: August 4, 1928
- Running time: 83 minutes
- Country: United States
- Languages: Sound (Part-talkie); English intertitles

The Perfect Crime is a 1928 American sound part-talkie crime drama film directed by Bert Glennon and starring Clive Brook, Irene Rich and Ethel Wales. The film is loosely based on the 1892 novel The Big Bow Mystery by Israel Zangwill.

The film is important historically as it was the first sound feature to be released by FBO. It was the first feature film not produced by either Warner Bros. or Fox Film to contain synchronized sound, also being the first non-Warner feature to contain any talking sequences.

== Plot ==
Benson, the world's most celebrated criminologist, has walked away from a career that made him both feared and revered. Known for his ice-cold logic and ruthless efficiency in tracking down criminals, Benson now lives in seclusion, his home as barren as the heart within him. His withdrawal from public life follows a private heartbreak—his fiancée, Stella, had left him, repulsed by his remorseless pursuit of crime over compassion.

But Benson's brilliant mind cannot rest.

Haunted by the idea of intellectual supremacy, he becomes obsessed with a disturbing notion: Could a man like himself commit the perfect crime—one so flawless it would defy even the greatest minds of detection?

His unsuspecting test subject is Frisbie, a pathetic and slovenly tenant with a weak heart and weaker character. Under the guise of scientific experimentation, Benson gives him a sedative and instructs him to sleep with all doors and windows shut—an obsessive detail meant to reinforce the illusion of an airtight alibi. In the morning, Mrs. Frisbie, unable to enter her husband's locked room, begs Benson for help. Playing the concerned neighbor, he "discovers" the body—murdered while asleep.

No clues. No witnesses. No motive.

The police, baffled and grasping, turn to Benson for guidance. He refuses, hiding behind the polite veneer of retirement. The plan has worked too well.

Just as he prepares to enjoy the thrill of impunity, Stella returns. Her love rekindled, she believes Benson has changed. With her, he dares to imagine a future again. But that same night brings chilling news: Trevor, a young man who once boarded with the Frisbies, has been arrested for the murder. The circumstantial evidence against him is damning. His distraught wife, Mrs. Trevor, arrives with their infant in her arms, begging Benson—the greatest detective in the world—to save her husband from the gallows.

Now, the perfect crime has become a monstrous injustice.

Torn between guilt, fear, and his love for Stella, Benson refuses the woman—but Stella's quiet insistence awakens his conscience. He agrees to revisit the scene.

In a powerful climactic scene, Benson gathers the police, including the cynical Detective Jones, at the Frisbie residence. With Stella watching, he coolly dismantles the official case. Demonstrating how the detectives ignored key details, he exonerates Trevor completely—but does not name the true killer. His demonstration is brilliant, his guilt unspoken.

Then, Benson walks alone into the night, his coat billowing behind him like a man headed to his own execution.

As the screen fades, we see Benson alone once more, studying a book titled “Murder as a Fine Art.” But then, with a jolt, he awakens—it was all a dream.

Shaken and pale, Benson puts down the book. The monstrous fantasy has revealed its warning: even contemplating evil, for the sake of intellect or pride, can lead a man to the brink of moral collapse.

== Cast ==
- Clive Brook as Benson
- Irene Rich as Stella
- Ethel Wales as Mrs. Frisbie
- Carroll Nye as Trevor
- Gladys McConnell as Mrs. Trevor
- Edmund Breese as Wilmot
- James Farley as Jones
- Phil Gastrock as Butler
- Tully Marshall as Frisbie
- Jane La Verne as Trevor Baby
- Lynne Overman as Newlywed

== Production ==
In addition to sequences with audible dialogue or talking sequences, the film features a synchronized musical score and sound effects along with English intertitles. The soundtrack was recorded using the RCA Photophone sound-on-film system.

== See also ==
- List of early sound feature films (1926–1929)

== Bibliography ==
- Ken Wlaschin. Silent Mystery and Detective Movies: A Comprehensive Filmography. McFarland, 2009.
