= List of Harlequin Romance novels released in 1951 =

This is a list of Harlequin Romance novels released in 1951. (Main index: List of Harlequin Romance novels)

== Releases ==
| Number | Title | Author | Date | Citations |
|---|---|---|---|---|
| # 91 | Lady, That's My Skull | Carl Shannon | 1951 | |
| # 92 | Dig Another Grave | Don Cameron | 1951 | |
| # 93 | Empty Saddles | Al Cody | 1951 | |
| # 94 | The Range Doctor | Oscar J. Friend | 1951 | |
| # 95 | You're Lonely When You're Dead | James Hadley Chase | 1951 | |
| # 96 | The Rider From Yonder | Norman A. Fox | 1951 | |
| # 97 | My Old Man's Badge | Ferguson Findley | 1951 | |
| # 98 | Jigger Moran | John Roeburt | 1951 | |
| # 99 | Murder - Queen High (Note: Not a romance) | Bill Miller and Bob Wade | 1951 | |
| # 100 | Black Rider | Jackson Cole | 1951 | |
| # 101 | Three For The Money | Joe Barry | 1951 | |
| # 102 | Wreath For A Redhead | Brian Moore | 1951 | |
| # 103 | Wanton City | O.M. Hall | 1951 | |
| # 104 | Tough Cop | John Roeburt | 1951 | |
| # 105 | Vengeance Valley | Paul Evan Lehman | 1951 | |
| # 106 | The Window With The Sleeping Nude | Robert Leslie Bellem | 1951 | |
| # 107 | The Man From Bar-20 | Clarence E. Mulford | 1951 | |
| # 108 | No Orchids For Miss Blandish | James Hadley Chase | 1951 | |
| # 109 | Corpse On The Town | John Roeburt | 1951 | |
| # 110 | Tombstone Stage | William Hopson | 1951 | |
| # 111 | The Flesh Of The Orchid | James Hadley Chase | 1951 | |
| # 112 | Gina | George Albert Glay | 1951 (Note: Reprint of 1949 original) | |
| # 113 | Beyond The Blue Mountains | Jean Plaidy | 1951 | |
| # 114 | Johnny Saxon | William G. Bogart | 1951 | |
| # 115 | Manhattan Underworld | John Roeburt | 1951 | |
| # 116 | Kill The Toff | John Creasey | 1951 | |
| # 117 | The Executioners | Brian Moore | 1951 | |
| # 118 | Range Justice | Paul Evan Lehman | 1951 | |
| # 119 | When Texans Ride | J. E. Grinstead | 1951 | |
| # 120 | Slay Ride For A Lady | Harry Whittington | 1951 | |
| # 121 | Run For Your Life | Michael Stark | 1951 | |
| # 122 | A Matter Of Policy | Sam Merwin, Jr. | 1951 | |
| # 123 | Saddle Wolves | Allan K. Echols | 1951 | |
| # 124 | The Dead Stay Dumb | James Hadley Chase | 1951 | |
| # 125 | The Hidden Portal | Garnett Weston | 1951 | |
| # 126 | Death About Face | Frank Kane | 1951 | |
| # 127 | Dark Memory | Edward Ronns | 1951 | |
| # 128 | Law Of The '45 | Paul Evan Lehman | 1951 | |
| # 129 | Hire This Killer | Ferguson Findley | 1951 | |
| # 130 | Figure It Out For Yourself | James Hadley Chase | 1951 | |
| # 131 | Tex | Clarence E. Mulford | 1951 | |
| # 132 | False Face | Leslie Edgley | 1951 | |
| # 133 | Frontier Doctor | Bradford Scott | 1951 | |
| # 134 | The Killers | George C. Henderson | 1951 | |
| # 135 | Lay Her Among The Lilies | James Hadley Chase | 1951 | |
| # 136 | Boot Hill | Weston Clay | 1951 | |
| # 137 | Berlin At Midnight | Robert Joseph | 1951 | |
| # 138 | Emma Hart | Lozania Prole | 1951 | |
| # 139 | The Glass Ladder | Paul W. Fairman | 1951 | |
| # 140 | The Lady Was A Tramp | Harry Whittington | 1951 | |
| # 141 | Roger Sudden | Thomas H. Raddall | 1951 | |
| # 142 | Doctor By Day | Thomas Stone | 1951 | |
| # 143 | Rebel Yell | Leslie Ernenwein | 1951 | |
| # 144 | City for Conquest | Aben Kandel | 1951 (Note: Reprint of 1949 original) | |
| # 145 | Rio Renegade | Leslie Ernenwein | 1951 | |
| # 146 | Trail Rider | Lynn Westland | 1951 | |
| # 147 | Pardon My Body | Dale Bogard | 1951 | |
