= Sam Spiegel =

American film producer (1901–1985)

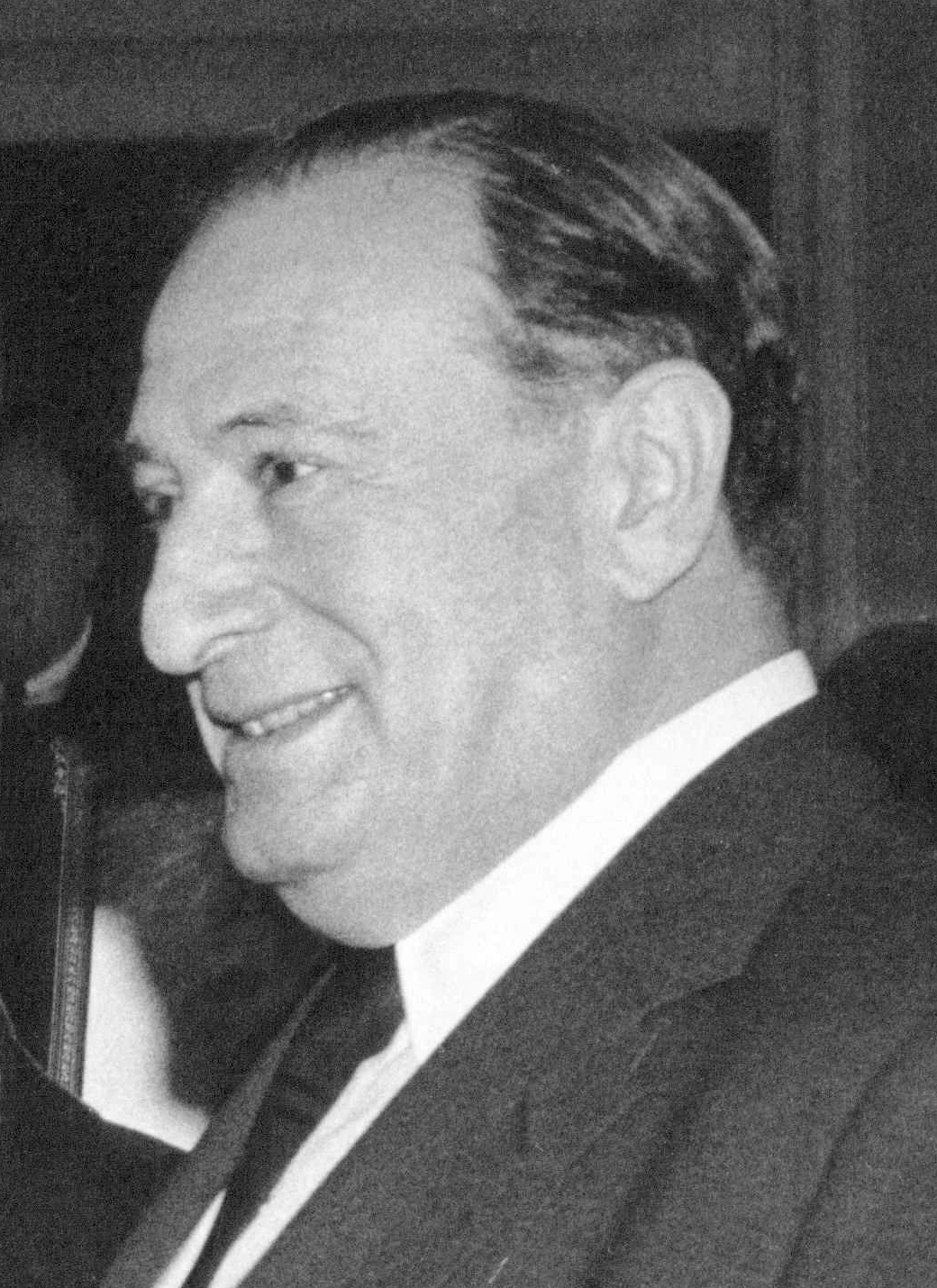
- Spiegel in 1963
- Born: Samuel P. Spiegel; November 11, 1901; Jarosław, Austrian Poland
- Died: December 31, 1985 (aged 84); Saint Martin
- Education: University of Vienna
- Occupation: Film producer
- Years active: 1927–1983
- Notable work: On the Waterfront; The Bridge on the River Kwai; Lawrence of Arabia
- Spouses: Rachel Agranovich (m. 1920; div. 1926) Lynne Baggett (m. 1948; div. 1955) Betty Benson (m. 1958)
- Children: 2
- Awards: Irving Thalberg Memorial Award

Samuel P. Spiegel (November 11, 1901 – December 31, 1985) was an American independent film producer. Financially responsible for some of the most critically acclaimed motion pictures of the 20th century, Spiegel produced films that won the Academy Award for Best Picture three times, a Hollywood first for a sole independent producer.

== Early life ==
Spiegel was born on 11 November 1901 to a German-speaking Jewish family in Jarosław, Galicia, Austria-Hungary (later modern Poland). His parents were Simon (Szymon) Spiegel, and Regina Spiegel, who originated from Bukovina in the vicinity of Lviv. Spiegel was known within his family by the nickname "Mounik". He had two brothers, Leon and Shalom Spiegel (1899-c. 1984), who was a professor of medieval Hebrew poetry.

The family lived and operated a tobacco business on 6 Grodzka Street in Jarosław. Simon Spiegel was active in Jewish communal affairs and Zionist organizations, and during the Second Polish Republic, he remained active in municipal and Jewish communal affairs and served as a member of the Jarosław city council in 1932–1933. Simon, Regina, and 12 family members were murdered in the Holocaust, after deportations to Auschwitz-Birkenau, from Jaroslaw.

The Spiegel family had connections to Jarosław extending back at least to the previous generation. Spiegel's paternal grandfather, Meilich, is recorded as having been born in Jarosław around 1830. His father Simon was born in Żółkiew in 1872, while Simon's brother Itzack Zvi was also born there. Simon's sister Fani was born in Niesterow.

Spiegel attended the Imperial-Royal Gymnasium in Jarosław from 1911, which later became the Mikołaj Kopernik High School in Jarosław. School records describe him in several years as "chlubnie uzdolniony", showing exceptional academic ability. He was raised with Jewish religious instruction, in the cheder but showed much greater interest in secular pursuits, including the cinema. Spiegel's mother, Regina, had a significant role in the upbringing of her children. According to biographer Natasha Fraser-Cavassoni, she emphasized education, manners and social presentation.

In the First World War, the family was sympathetic to Emperor Franz Joseph I, a position also held by some Jewish families in Galicia. Spiegel later recalled his childhood as having been happy until the postwar collapse and devaluation of the Austro-Hungarian currency.

Following WW1, Spiegel became involved with the Zionist youth movement Hashomer Hatzair. In 1919 he moved to Łódź and traveled to other Polish cities, and then was mobilized for the Polish Army, fighting in the Battle of Warsaw. By 1920, Spiegel had left the territory of the newly established Polish state and moved to Austria, marrying Rachel Agranovich. His older brother Shalom was already studying in Vienna, and Samuel enrolled at the University of Vienna. His university studies were brief. He subsequently traveled to Mandatory Palestine, where he continued his involvement with Hashomer Hatzair and Zionist activities.

== Career ==
Spiegel worked briefly in Hollywood in 1927, and then went to Berlin to produce German and French adaptations of Universal films. In 1933 he fled Germany following the election of the Nazi party and increased antisemitism. As an independent producer, Spiegel helped produce a number of European films.

In 1938, he emigrated to Mexico and subsequently the United States.

Between 1935 and 1954, Spiegel billed himself as S. P. Eagle; after that he used his real name. His nickname was the "velvet octopus" after his propensity to entwine himself with women in the back of taxis and manage Hollywood with a velvet touch according to Billy Wilder. He loved London and admired the British, as is reflected in his films The Bridge on the River Kwai (1957) and Lawrence of Arabia (1962), both of which won seven Academy Awards including Best Picture. Starting with the 1951 film The African Queen, he produced films through his British-based production company Horizon Pictures.

In a review in Variety of Natasha Fraser-Cavassoni's biography of Spiegel, Wendy Smith notes: "It's all here: the sleazy financial maneuvers and creepy taste for underage girls that make Spiegel a decidedly flawed protagonist, as well as the wit, sophistication, and Old World charm that make him a titanic figure the likes of which the movie industry will not see again."

== Awards ==
Spiegel won the Academy Award for Best Picture for Elia Kazan's On the Waterfront as well as for The Bridge on the River Kwai (1957) and Lawrence of Arabia (1962), both directed by Briton David Lean. In 1963, he was awarded the Irving Thalberg Memorial Award at that year's Academy Awards for his many contributions to cinema.

== Sexual misconduct allegations ==
American actress Theresa Russell alleged that she was sexually propositioned by Spiegel during her first casting session for his 1976 film The Last Tycoon. In another interview, Russell recalled: "I was 16 years old and still living at home, and he took me to the Bistro and tried to stick his tongue down my throat." After she refused to sign a contract with Spiegel, Russell "was completely left out of the publicity for The Last Tycoon, and Spiegel threatened that he would prevent Russell from working again in Hollywood.

== Personal life ==
Spiegel was married three times: to Rachel Agronovich from 1922 to 1926, with whom he had one daughter; to the actress Lynne Baggett, from 1948 to 1953, and to Betty Benson, from 1957 until his death. He also had a son by Ann Pennington.

Spiegel maintained a connection with Israel throughout his life, particularly with such personalities as Golda Meir, Ariel Sharon, Jerusalem Foundation president Ruth Cheshin (wife of Mishael Cheshin), and his close friend, then Jerusalem Mayor Teddy Kollek. Spiegel also contributed to various Zionist causes. He spoke eight languages fluently: English, French, German, Italian, Spanish, Polish, Hebrew and Yiddish, and some Sanskrit.

== Legacy ==
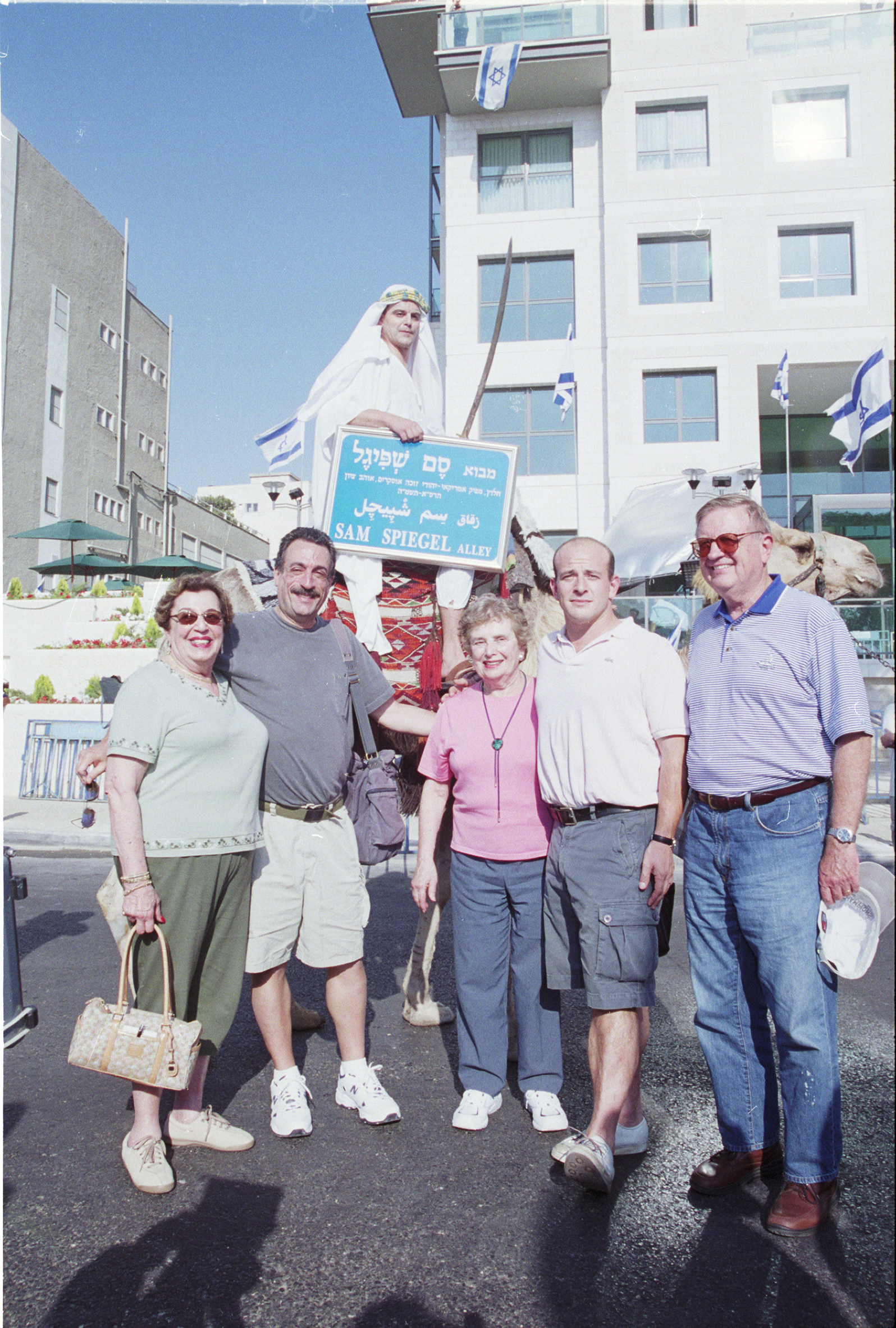
Relatives of Sam Spiegel with the sign that marks the lane named after him in Jerusalem

Spiegel's heirs and the administrators of his estate, son Adam Spiegel, daughter Alisa Freedman, niece Judge Raya Dreben, and Adv. David Bottoms, decided to transfer Spiegel's impressive art collection to the Israel Museum in Jerusalem. Since 1996, they have made an annual contribution, through the Jerusalem Foundation, to the film school in Jerusalem bearing his name since that time – the Sam Spiegel Film and Television School, Jerusalem. This annual contribution is the largest in the history of Israeli cinema.

In 2005, the 15th anniversary of the establishment of the Sam Spiegel Film and Television School, the Jerusalem Municipality complied with a request from the school's founder-director Renen Schorr to mark the occasion by declaring the lane in the Talpiot industrial section where the school is located "The Sam Spiegel Alley." The street sign's inscription: "Sam Spiegel – Jewish-American Film Producer and Oscar-winner. Pioneer. Lover of Zion."

== Filmography as producer ==
1. Invisible Opponent (1933)
2. The Oil Sharks (1933)
3. Mariage à responsabilité limitée (1933)
4. The Invader (1935) (co-producer)
5. Derrière la façade (1939)
6. Tales of Manhattan (1942) (as S. P. Eagle)
7. The Stranger (1946) (as S. P. Eagle)
8. We Were Strangers (1949) (as S. P. Eagle)
9. When I Grow Up (1951) (as S. P. Eagle)
10. The Prowler (1951) (as S. P. Eagle)
11. The African Queen (1951) (as S. P. Eagle)
12. Melba (1953)
13. On the Waterfront (1954)
14. The Strange One (1957)
15. The Bridge on the River Kwai (1957)
16. Suddenly, Last Summer (1959)
17. Lawrence of Arabia (1962)
18. The Chase (1966)
19. The Night of the Generals (1967)
20. The Happening (1967)
21. Nicholas and Alexandra (1971)
22. The Last Tycoon (1976)
23. Betrayal (1983)
