= The Big Bow Mystery =

English mystery novel

- Author: Israel Zangwill
- Language: English
- Genre: Mystery
- Publication date: 1892
- Publication place: United Kingdom
- Media type: Print
- Text: The Big Bow Mystery at Wikisource

The Big Bow Mystery is an 1892 murder mystery novel by the British writer Israel Zangwill. It was originally serialised in The Star newspaper in 1891, before being published as a novel the following year. Set in London's East End, it is one of the earliest examples of the locked-room mystery genre.

== Film adaptations ==
The story served as the basis for three Hollywood film versions. The Perfect Crime (1928) and The Crime Doctor (1934) were both set in the contemporary United States, and The Verdict (1946) returned the story to the late-Victorian London setting of the original novel.

== Bibliography ==
- Goble, Alan. The Complete Index to Literary Sources in Film. Walter de Gruyter, 1999.
- Herbert, Rosemary. Whodunit?: A Who's Who in Crime & Mystery Writing. Oxford University Press, 2003.
