= The Verdict (1946 film) =

1946 film by Don Siegel

- Theatrical release poster
- Directed by: Don Siegel
- Screenplay by: Peter Milne
- Based on: The Big Bow Mystery by Israel Zangwill
- Produced by: William Jacobs
- Starring: Sydney Greenstreet; Peter Lorre; Joan Lorring
- Cinematography: Ernest Haller
- Edited by: Thomas Reilly
- Music by: Frederick Hollander
- Production company: Warner Bros. Pictures
- Distributed by: Warner Bros. Pictures
- Release date: November 23, 1946
- Running time: 86 minutes
- Country: United States
- Language: English

The Verdict is a 1946 American film noir mystery drama film directed by Don Siegel and written by Peter Milne, loosely based on Israel Zangwill's 1892 novel The Big Bow Mystery. It stars Sydney Greenstreet and Peter Lorre in one of their nine film pairings, as well as Joan Lorring and George Coulouris. The Verdict was Siegel's first full-length feature film.

== Plot ==
At London's Newgate Prison in 1890, a man convicted of murder is executed. Scotland Yard Superintendent George Grodman had assembled the case against him based on circumstantial evidence. The defendant had claimed that at the time of the murder he was with a Reverend Hoffman, who then immediately departed for Wales, but this alibi witness could not be found there. However, this turns out to be because he actually went to New South Wales. Hoffman returns to London just after the man he would have cleared is executed, and Grodman is fired over the miscarriage of justice. His replacement as superintendent is the obnoxious and gloating John Buckley.

Arthur Kendall, the nephew of the victim in the case, happens to be a friend and neighbor of Grodman, as are artist Victor Emmric and Kendall's political opponent Clive Russell. The three of them visit Grodman together; he tells them he plans to write a memoir of his career, and accepts Emmric's offer to draw the illustrations of bodies and the like. However, Russell and Kendall almost come to blows before leaving.

The next day Kendall's landlady, Mrs. Benson, fails to wake him up, and fetches Grodman from his home to help. Grodman breaks down Kendall's door: the man has been stabbed to death inside the locked room. Buckley starts by consulting a burglar, Barney Cole, about the locks, but Cole cannot figure out how the crime was committed. Then Buckley arrests a music-hall singer, Lottie Rawson, who had been heard arguing with Kendall, but it was only a lovers' quarrel and eventually she is freed.

Russell is the MP from Brockton, and his alibi was that he was traveling there at the time of the murder, but Buckley is able to disprove this and now investigates him. The unused ticket to Brockton is found in Russell's home together with the murder weapon, so Russell is arrested, tried, and convicted.

Awaiting execution, Russell confides a new alibi to Grodman: when he was supposed to be traveling, he was actually having an affair with a married woman. To protect her, he swears Grodman to secrecy, but Grodman traces her anyway. However, this does not help, because it turns out she has just died.

At the last moment Grodman asks Emmric to accompany him to Newgate, where Grodman confesses to the murder. He killed Kendall for justice: Kendall had been the one who murdered his aunt and allowed an Innocent man to be executed for the crime. Grodman faked the locked room by depending on Mrs. Benson's reactions. He drugged Kendall so that he would not wake up in the morning, and when he went to "investigate", Grodman stabbed the sleeping killer while Mrs. Benson was cowering outside the door. He later broke into Russell's home and planted the murder weapon. Thus Russell is exonerated.

Grodman hands Emmric the manuscript of his memoir, which explains all this, and asks him to ensure it is published once the police are through with it. He has now achieved his other purpose in the crime: Superintendent Buckley is humiliated.

== Cast ==
- Sydney Greenstreet as Superintendent George Grodman
- Peter Lorre as Victor Emmric
- Joan Lorring as Lottie Rawson
- George Coulouris as Superintendent John R. Buckley
- Rosalind Ivan as Mrs. Vicky Benson
- Paul Cavanagh as Clive Russell
- Arthur Shields as Reverend Holbrook
- Morton Lowry as Arthur Kendall
- Holmes Herbert as Sir William Dawson
- Clyde Cook as Barney Cole
- John Goldsworthy as Chaplain
- Ian Wolfe as Jury Foreman (uncredited)

== Photography ==
During his apprenticeship at Warner Bros. Pictures, Siegel "set up the montage department" under the auspices of special effects chief Byron Haskin and "the style of his film evolved from there." Biographer Judith M. Kass writes that The Verdict is exceptional among Siegel's films for its absence of "overlapping or dissolving clips and cross-cutting."

In his first feature, The Verdict, Siegel deliberately avoided the use of montage, but years of creating montages had been irrevocably stamped upon his style and there are few films which do not display the editing techniques he developed then.

== Reception ==
Bosley Crowther in The New York Times was unimpressed; "It is rather hard to figure just what the Warners saw in this antique mystery story other than roles for Sydney Greenstreet and Peter Lorre. But even those are of slight consequence...Neither gentleman approaches his assignment with apparent satisfaction or zest. Mr. Greenstreet is puffier than usual, and Mr. Lorre more disinterested and wan. In the end, after various turns and skirmishes uninspiredly aimed to baffle and disturb, they both seem entirely willing to call quits." Variety wrote "Stock mystery tale with period background, The Verdict aims at generating suspense and thrills, succeeding modestly."

== See also ==
- The Crime Doctor (1934)

== Sources ==
- Kass, Judith M. (1975). Don Seigel: The Hollywood Professionals, Volume 4 (1975 ed.). New York: Tanvity Press. p. 207. ISBN 0-498-01665-X.
