= Don Siegel =

American filmmaker (1912–1991)

Donald Siegel
- Siegel in 1968
- Born: October 26, 1912; Chicago, Illinois, U.S.
- Died: April 20, 1991 (aged 78); Nipomo, California, U.S.
- Education: Jesus College, Cambridge; Royal Academy of Dramatic Art
- Occupations: Director; producer; editor
- Years active: 1939−84
- Spouses: Viveca Lindfors (m. 1948; div. 1953) Doe Avedon (m. 1957; div. 1975) Carol Rydall (m. 1981)
- Children: 5, including Kristoffer Tabori

Donald Siegel (/ˈsiːɡəl/ SEE-gəl; October 26, 1912 – April 20, 1991) was an American film and television director, producer, and editor. He was described by The New York Times as "a director of tough, cynical and forthright action-adventure films whose taut plots centered on individualistic loners".

Siegel directed the science fiction horror film Invasion of the Body Snatchers (1956), as well as five films with Clint Eastwood, including the action thriller Dirty Harry (1971) and the prison thriller Escape from Alcatraz (1979). He also directed John Wayne's final film, the Western The Shootist (1976). Siegel's earlier film Riot in Cell Block 11 (1954) was noted as an influence on the development of auteur theory and the French New Wave. One critic described him as "Hollywood's greatest genre director."

== Early life and education ==
Siegel was born in 1912 to a Jewish family in Chicago; his father was Samuel Siegel, a mandolin player. Siegel attended schools in New York, then moved to England to study at Jesus College, Cambridge and Royal Academy of Dramatic Art. For a short time, he studied at Beaux Arts in Paris, but left at age 20 and later went to Los Angeles.

== Career ==
Siegel found work in the Warner Bros. film library after meeting producer Hal Wallis, and later rose to head of the montage department, where he directed thousands of montages, including the opening montage for Casablanca. In 1945, two shorts he directed, Star in the Night and Hitler Lives, won Academy Awards, which launched his career as a feature director. Siegel directed whatever material came his way, often transcending the limitations of budget and script to produce interesting and adept works. His 1954 prison thriller Riot in Cell Block 11, shot on-location at Folsom State Prison, was noted by auteurist critics of the French New Wave era, and earned Siegel a Directors Guild of America Award nomination

Siegel made the original Invasion of the Body Snatchers (1956), described by The Guardian in 2014 as a "fatalistic masterpiece" and "a touchstone for the sci-fi genre" which spawned three remakes. For television, he directed two episodes of The Twilight Zone, "Uncle Simon" (1963) and "The Self-Improvement of Salvadore Ross" (1964), and was the producer of The Legend of Jesse James (1965). He worked with Eli Wallach in The Lineup, Elvis Presley and Dolores del Río in Flaming Star (1960), with Steve McQueen in Hell Is for Heroes, and Lee Marvin in the influential The Killers (1964) before directing five of Eastwood's films that were commercially successful in addition to being well received by critics. These included the action films Coogan's Bluff and Dirty Harry, the Albert Maltz-scripted Western Two Mules for Sister Sara, the American Civil War melodrama The Beguiled, and the prison-break picture Escape from Alcatraz. Siegel also directed Charley Varrick starring Walter Matthau, which was originally slated for Eastwood, but ultimately turned down by the actor. He was a considerable influence on Eastwood's own career as a director, and Eastwood's film Unforgiven is dedicated "for Don and Sergio".

Siegel had a long collaboration with composer Lalo Schifrin, who scored five of his films: Coogan's Bluff, The Beguiled, Dirty Harry, Charley Varrick, and Telefon. Schifrin composed and recorded what would have been his sixth score for Siegel on Jinxed! (1982), but it was rejected by the studio despite Siegel's objections. This conflict was one of several fights Siegel had on his last film.

Siegel was also important to the career of director Sam Peckinpah. In 1954, Peckinpah was hired as a dialogue coach for Riot in Cell Block 11. His job entailed acting as an assistant to the director, Siegel. The film was shot on location at Folsom Prison. Siegel's location work and his use of actual prisoners as extras in the film made a lasting impression on Peckinpah. He worked as a dialogue coach on four additional Siegel films: Private Hell 36 (1954), An Annapolis Story (1955), Invasion of the Body Snatchers (1956), and Crime in the Streets (1956). Twenty-five years later, Peckinpah was all but banished from the industry due to his troubled film productions. Siegel gave the director a chance to return to filmmaking. He asked Peckinpah if he would be interested in directing 12 days of second unit on Siegel's Jinxed! film. Peckinpah immediately accepted, and his earnest collaboration with his longtime friend was noted within the industry. While Peckinpah's work was uncredited, it led to his hiring as the director of his final film The Osterman Weekend (1983).

=== Cameos ===
Siegel had a small role as a bartender in Eastwood's Play Misty for Me, and in Dirty Harry. In Philip Kaufman's 1978 Invasion of the Body Snatchers, a remake of Siegel's 1956 film, he appears as a taxi driver. In Charley Varrick, he has a cameo as a ping-pong player. He also appears in the 1985 John Landis film Into the Night. Siegel also has a small role in his remake of The Killers.

== Honors ==
Siegel received Lifetime Achievement honors from the Los Angeles Film Critics Association and the Telluride Film Festival.

== Personal life ==
Siegel and actress Viveca Lindfors were married from 1948 to 1953. They had a son, Kristoffer Tabori. He married Doe Avedon in 1957. They adopted four children and then divorced in 1975. Siegel then married Carol Rydall, a former secretary to Clint Eastwood.

=== Death ===
Siegel died at age 78 from cancer in Nipomo, California. Siegel is buried near Highway 1 in the coastal Cayucos-Morro Bay District Cemetery. He was an atheist.

== Filmography ==
=== Feature films ===
| Year | Title | Functioned as | | Studio/Distributor | Starring | Notes |
| Year | Title | Director | Producer | Studio/Distributor | Starring | Notes |
|---|---|---|---|---|---|---|
| 1945 | Star in the Night | Yes | No | Warner Bros. | J. Carrol Naish, Donald Woods, Rosina Galli | Short film |
| 1945 | Hitler Lives | Yes | No | Warner Bros. | —N/a | Short documentary |
| 1946 | The Verdict | Yes | No | Warner Bros. | Sydney Greenstreet, Peter Lorre, Joan Lorring | |
| 1949 | Night Unto Night | Yes | No | Warner Bros. | Ronald Reagan, Viveca Lindfors, Broderick Crawford | |
| 1949 | The Big Steal | Yes | No | RKO Pictures | Robert Mitchum, Jane Greer, William Bendix | |
| 1952 | The Duel at Silver Creek | Yes | No | Universal Pictures | Stephen McNally, Audie Murphy, Faith Domergue | |
| 1952 | No Time for Flowers | Yes | No | RKO Pictures | Viveca Lindfors, Paul Hubschmid, Ludwig Stössel | |
| 1953 | Count the Hours | Yes | No | RKO Pictures | Macdonald Carey, Teresa Wright, John Craven | |
| 1953 | China Venture | Yes | No | Columbia Pictures | Edmond O'Brien, Barry Sullivan, Jocelyn Brando | |
| 1954 | Riot in Cell Block 11 | Yes | No | Allied Artists | Neville Brand, Emile Meyer, Frank Faylen | |
| 1954 | Private Hell 36 | Yes | No | The Filmakers | Ida Lupino, Steve Cochran, Howard Duff | |
| 1955 | An Annapolis Story | Yes | No | Allied Artists | John Derek, Diana Lynn, Kevin McCarthy | |
| 1956 | Invasion of the Body Snatchers | Yes | No | Allied Artists | Kevin McCarthy, Dana Wynter, Larry Gates | |
| 1956 | Crime in the Streets | Yes | No | Allied Artists | James Whitmore, John Cassavetes, Sal Mineo | |
| 1957 | Baby Face Nelson | Yes | No | United Artists | Mickey Rooney, Carolyn Jones, Cedric Hardwicke | |
| 1957 | Spanish Affair | Yes | No | Paramount Pictures | Richard Kiley, Carmen Sevilla, José Guardiola | Co-directed with Luis Marquina |
| 1958 | The Gun Runners | Yes | No | United Artists | Audie Murphy, Eddie Albert, Patricia Owens | |
| 1958 | The Lineup | Yes | No | Columbia Pictures | Eli Wallach, Robert Keith, Warner Anderson | |
| 1959 | Hound-Dog Man | Yes | No | 20th Century Fox | Fabian Forte, Stuart Whitman, Carol Lynley | |
| 1959 | Edge of Eternity | Yes | Associate | Columbia Pictures | Cornel Wilde, Victoria Shaw, Mickey Shaughnessy | |
| 1960 | Flaming Star | Yes | No | 20th Century Fox | Elvis Presley, Barbara Eden, Dolores del Río | |
| 1962 | Hell Is for Heroes | Yes | No | Paramount Pictures | Steve McQueen, Bobby Darin, Fess Parker | |
| 1964 | The Killers | Yes | Yes | Universal Pictures | Lee Marvin, Angie Dickinson, John Cassavetes | |
| 1968 | Coogan's Bluff | Yes | Yes | Universal Pictures | Clint Eastwood, Lee J. Cobb, Susan Clark | |
| 1968 | Madigan | Yes | No | Universal Pictures | Richard Widmark, Henry Fonda, Inger Stevens | |
| 1969 | Death of a Gunfighter | Yes | No | Universal Pictures | Richard Widmark, Lena Horne, John Saxon | Replaced Robert Totten; Credited as 'Allen Smithee' (Note: The Directors Guild of America pseudonym 'Alan Smithee' was created for this film.) |
| 1970 | Two Mules for Sister Sara | Yes | No | Universal Pictures | Clint Eastwood, Shirley MacLaine, Manolo Fábregas | |
| 1971 | The Beguiled | Yes | Yes | Universal Pictures | Clint Eastwood, Geraldine Page, Elizabeth Hartman | |
| 1971 | Dirty Harry | Yes | Yes | Warner Bros. | Clint Eastwood, Harry Guardino, Andrew Robinson | |
| 1973 | Charley Varrick | Yes | Yes | Universal Pictures | Walter Matthau, Joe Don Baker, Andrew Robinson | |
| 1974 | The Black Windmill | Yes | Yes | Universal Pictures | Michael Caine, Donald Pleasence, Delphine Seyrig | |
| 1976 | The Shootist | Yes | No | Paramount Pictures | John Wayne, Lauren Bacall, Ron Howard | |
| 1977 | Telefon | Yes | No | Metro-Goldwyn-Mayer | Charles Bronson, Lee Remick, Donald Pleasence | |
| 1979 | Escape from Alcatraz | Yes | Yes | Paramount Pictures | Clint Eastwood, Patrick McGoohan, Fred Ward | |
| 1980 | Rough Cut | Yes | No | Paramount Pictures | Burt Reynolds, Lesley-Anne Down, David Niven | |
| 1982 | Jinxed! | Yes | No | Metro-Goldwyn-Mayer | Bette Midler, Ken Wahl, Rip Torn | |

==== Other production credits ====
| Year | Title | Notes |
|---|---|---|
| 1939 | Confessions of a Nazi Spy | Montage editor |
| 1939 | The Roaring Twenties | Montage editor |
| 1940 | Brother Orchid | Montage editor |
| 1940 | All This, and Heaven Too | Montage editor |
| 1940 | They Drive by Night | Montage editor |
| 1940 | Knute Rockne, All American | Montage editor |
| 1941 | Meet John Doe | Montage editor |
| 1941 | One Foot in Heaven | Montage editor |
| 1941 | Blues in the Night | Montage editor |
| 1941 | They Died with Their Boots On | Montage editor |
| 1941 | Sergeant York | 2nd unit director |
| 1942 | Now, Voyager | Montage editor |
| 1942 | George Washington Slept Here | Montage editor |
| 1942 | Gentleman Jim | Montage editor |
| 1942 | Across the Pacific | Montage editor |
| 1942 | Casablanca | Montage editor |
| 1943 | The Hard Way | Montage editor |
| 1943 | Edge of Darkness | Montage editor |
| 1943 | Mission to Moscow | Montage editor/2nd unit director |
| 1943 | This Is the Army | Montage editor |
| 1943 | Northern Pursuit | 2nd unit director |
| 1944 | The Adventures of Mark Twain | Montage editor |
| 1944 | To Have and Have Not | 2nd unit director |
| 1944 | The Conspirators | 2nd unit director |
| 1945 | Saratoga Trunk | Montage editor/2nd unit director |
| 1946 | Devotion | Montage editor |
| 1949 | All the King's Men | 2nd unit director |

=== Television ===
| Year | Title | Functioned as | | Network | Notes |
| Year | Title | Director | Producer | Network | Notes |
|---|---|---|---|---|---|
| 1952-53 | The Doctor | Yes | No | NBC | 3 episodes |
| 1955 | Frontier | Yes | No | NBC | 1 episode |
| 1957 | Code 3 | Yes | No | Syndication | 1 episode |
| 1959 | Adventure Showcase | Yes | No | CBS | 1 episode |
| 1960 | Alcoa Theatre | Yes | No | NBC | 1 episode |
| 1961 | Bus Stop | Yes | No | ABC | 1 episode |
| 1963 | The Lloyd Bridges Show | Yes | No | CBS | 1 episode |
| 1963 | Breaking Point | Yes | No | ABC | 1 episode |
| 1963-64 | The Twilight Zone | Yes | No | CBS | 2 episodes (Note: "Uncle Simon" and "The Self-Improvement of Salvadore Ross".) |
| 1964 | Destry | Yes | No | ABC | 1 episode |
| 1964 | The Hanged Man | Yes | No | NBC | TV movie |
| 1965 | Convoy | Yes | Yes | NBC | 1 episode |
| 1965-66 | The Legend of Jesse James | Yes | Yes | ABC | Director; 1 episode Producer; 34 episodes |
| 1967 | Stranger on the Run | Yes | No | NBC | TV movie |
