= Here Is Germany =

1945 film by Frank Capra

- Directed by: Frank Capra
- Written by: William L. Shirer; Gottfried Reinhardt; Ernst Lubitsch; Georg Ziomer; Anthony Veiller
- Produced by: Office of War Information
- Narrated by: Walter Huston; Anthony Veiller; John Beal
- Music by: Dimitri Tiomkin
- Release date: October 1945
- Running time: 52 minutes
- Country: United States
- Language: English

Here Is Germany is a 1945 American propaganda documentary film directed by Frank Capra and written by William L. Shirer, Gottfried Reinhardt, Ernst Lubitsch, Georg Ziomer and Anthony Veiller. Like its companion film, Know Your Enemy: Japan, the film is a full-length exploration of why one of the three major Axis countries started World War II and what had to be done to keep them from "doing it again".

The film opens with scenes of everyday life in Germany, described by narrator Walter Huston. It shows people such as housewives, mailmen, farmers and policemen at work, and notes that these people were not so different from Americans, and seem like people Americans can understand. Anthony Veiller then interrupts with "Or can we?", as the film then switches to a montage of Nazi concentration camps and piles of dead bodies. The narrator notes that this is not the only time that Germany has unleashed war on the world, stating that while its generation fought the "Nazis", its fathers fought the "Huns" (pejorative term for Germany during World War I), and its grandfathers remember the "Prussians". The narrator states that it was all part of the same German lust for conquest. The militarism of the Prussian state is identified as the bad idea that triumphed over several other trends in German thought.

Going even further back to identify the cause of this 150 years, the film informs us that while America, Britain, and France were forming their democratic traditions, Germany was a group of 300 medieval feudal states, not one of them with a constitution or parliament. The film traces the rise of Prussia from Frederick the Great through Otto von Bismarck, telling the audience that the Prussian state was organized as an instrument of aggressive conquest, dominated first by aristocratic landowners, militarists and state officials, later joined by those big industrialists with ties to the militarists and their Imperial Government (such as Krupp and Thyssen). The development of a military-industrial dominated state in the founding of the Prussian-dominated German Empire in 1870 climaxes in the catastrophe of World War I. When the nationalist militarists knew that they were beaten, according to the film, they allowed democratic parties to take the reins of power and immediately set about destabilising and discrediting the new republic. Once accomplished they found a stooge in Adolf Hitler, who would finally destroy the liberal Weimar Republic with the addition of a 5th pillar - party thugs.

The film depicts the Third Reich from this perspective, seeing Nazism as simply a continuation of the aggressive German tradition, promoted by the military–industrial complex (those businesses dependent on government contracts for arms). It does not quite make clear that the Party confounded its nationalist supporters by absorbing them, and becoming then only real power in Germany. The film says that Poles, Italians, Belgians, and Americans were murdered by the Germans. The Nazi persecution of Jews is not explicitly mentioned, but in the initial sequence of Nazi atrocities it shows the bones of "men, women and children: sent to be exterminated in a German death factory". The film also shows what are alleged to be "objects of art, made from human skin."

The film finishes with a list of different things that are being done to prevent Germany from starting another World War, chief among them the total conquest and control of the German state. Several specific examples include the destruction of Nazi art and literature, the creation of new textbooks to be taught to youth in Germany, a strong Allied military presence in Germany, the destruction of most of German war industry and the remaining industry controlled by the allies, and the removal of high ranking leaders from power. No mention of the Nuremberg trials are given here, as they began November 20, 1945, and instead the film shows a German army officer blindfolded with hands tied and shot at a post.

The film ends with a short cautionary speech, where Anthony Veiller notes that for Germany, "We have rid him of Hitler, and the General staff, and Nazism, and militarism, but we have not rid him of Frederick, and Bismark, and the Kaiser, of his history and his traditions. That he must do for himself. Until he does, he is still a potential enemy of civilization. Only when he does can he take his place in the society of man. Then, and then only, will the German farmer, the German mailman, the German cop be like the folks back home. Then, and then only, can beautiful Germany, industrious Germany, cultured Germany join the peaceful nations of the world."

== See also ==
- Your Job in Germany
- List of Allied propaganda films of World War II
- Sonderweg
