= Rosina Galli (actress) =

Italian actress (1906–1969)

- Born: Rosina Raggozino; August 10, 1906; Venice, Italy
- Died: December 3, 1969 (aged 63); Madrid, Spain
- Occupation: Actress
- Years active: 1936–1950
- Spouse: Augusto Galli
- Children: 1

Rosina Fiorini Galli (August 10. 1906 – December 3, 1969) was an Italian film actress in Hollywood.

== Early years ==
Galli was born in Venice and was a member of "a typical Italian theatrical family". She began performing as a child.

== Career ==
Galli was an Italian character actress who worked in Hollywood between the mid-1930s and the mid-1940s, where she performed in about 40 films. She appeared with Clark Gable in They Met in Bombay (1941) and played Christine's maid in The Phantom of the Opera (1943). The actress also portrayed the friendly wife of J. Carrol Naish in Star in the Night (1945), an Academy-Award-winning short film by Don Siegel. Through her accent she frequently played motherly characters of Italian or Spanish descent, mostly in small roles. Afterwards Galli returned to Italy where she also played in three other movies until 1950. She also worked as the Italian dubbing voice for actresses like Joan Crawford, Marie Dressler, and Myrna Loy. Rosina Galli died in Madrid at the age of 63.

On Broadway, Galli portrayed Theresa in Walk into My Parlor (1941).

== Personal life ==
She was married to Augusto Galli.

== Partial filmography ==
- Moonlight Murder (1936) - Louisa's Maid (uncredited)
- Conquest (1937) - Bianca - Servant (uncredited)
- International Settlement (1938) - Italian Woman (uncredited)
- Of Human Hearts (1938) - Mrs. Ardsley (uncredited)
- Yellow Jack (1938) - Spanish Woman (uncredited)
- Blockade (1938) - Waitress
- I'll Give a Million (1938) - Citizen (uncredited)
- Fisherman's Wharf (1939) - Angelina
- The Oklahoma Kid (1939) - Manuelita (uncredited)
- Missing Daughters (1939) - Italian (uncredited)
- The Rains Came (1939) - Nurse (uncredited)
- The Housekeeper's Daughter (1939) - Mrs. Veroni
- Escape to Paradise (1939) - Brigida - the Dueña
- I Take This Woman (1940) - Clinic Woman Who Lost Her baby (uncredited)
- You Can't Fool Your Wife (1940) - Mama Brentoni
- The Man Who Talked Too Much (1940) - Mrs. Spirella (uncredited)
- You're Not So Tough (1940) - Mama Posita
- Girl from God's Country (1940) - Minor Role (uncredited)
- This Thing Called Love (1940) - Mrs. Diestro
- Respect the Law (1941, Short) - Mrs. Arturi, Bereaved Italian Mother (uncredited)
- They Met in Bombay (1941) - Carmencita
- Rags to Riches (1941) - Maria
- Mob Town (1941) - Woman (uncredited)
- Gauchos of El Dorado (1941) - Isabel Ojara
- The Mad Doctor of Market Street (1942) - Tanao- Chief's Wife
- Butch Minds the Baby (1942) - Mrs. Talucci
- My Gal Sal (1942) - Countess Rossini's Maid (uncredited)
- The Pride of the Yankees (1942) - Mrs. Fabrini (uncredited)
- Underground Agent (1942) - Maria Gonzales
- Good Luck, Mr. Yates (1943) - Katy Zaloris
- Phantom of the Opera (1943) - Christine's Maid
- The Fallen Sparrow (1943) - Mama Lepetino (uncredited)
- Princess O'Rourke (1943) - Greek's Wife (uncredited)
- The Navy Way (1944) - Mrs. Zumano - Johnny's Mother (uncredited)
- The Adventures of Mark Twain (1944) - Italian Nurse (uncredited)
- Man from Frisco (1944) - Mrs. Polaski (uncredited)
- Where Do We Go from Here? (1945) - Old Lady with Lamp (uncredited)
- Star in the Night (1945, Short) - Rosa Catapoli
- Yolanda and the Thief (1945) - Housekeeper (uncredited)
- Graf Cagliostro (1949) - (uncredited)
- Volcano (1950) - A Worker
- Fugitive Lady (Italian: La strada buia) (1950) Based on the novel Dark Road by Doris Miles Disney. - Teresa (final film role)
