= Hitler Lives =

1945 film

- Directed by: Don Siegel (uncredited)
- Written by: Saul Elkins
- Based on: Your Job in Germany (1945 documentary short)
- Produced by: Gordon Hollingshead
- Narrated by: Knox Manning
- Edited by: DeLeon Anthony
- Music by: William Lava
- Distributed by: Warner Bros.
- Release date: December 29, 1945
- Running time: 17 minutes
- Country: United States
- Language: English

Hitler Lives, also known as Hitler Lives?, is a 1945 American short documentary film directed by Don Siegel, who was uncredited, and written by Saul Elkins. It won an Oscar at the 18th Academy Awards in 1946 for Documentary Short Subject. The film's copyright was renewed in 1973.

Earlier in 1945, Siegel made his directorial debut on another short film Star in the Night, which also won an Academy Award.

== Production ==
Hitler Lives is based on the War Department film Your Job in Germany, which was produced shortly before the end of World War II in Europe. That film was directed by an uncredited Frank Capra, written by Theodor Geisel, later known as Dr. Seuss, and narrated by Dana Andrews; it was only shown to soldiers and was never released to the public.

While retaining some of the original film footage, Hitler Lives added both more archival footage and dramatized scenes. The film warns that the defeated German population still contains Nazi supporters and that the world must stay ever vigilant against the prospect that a new Hitler will arise within Germany. The crematoriums of a concentration camp are shown, only using "victims" to describe those murdered (without mentioning that they were Jewish). Finally, the film warns against fascism in the United States.

== Cast ==
- Knox Manning as narrator (voice)
- Joseph Goebbels as himself (archival footage, uncredited)
- Adolf Hitler as himself (archival footage, uncredited)
- Joseph Stalin as himself (archival footage, uncredited)
- Harry S. Truman as himself (archival footage, uncredited)
