= The Mob (1951 film) =

1951 film by Robert Parrish

- Theatrical release poster
- Directed by: Robert Parrish
- Screenplay by: William Bowers
- Based on: "Waterfront"'; 1951 Collier's serial by Ferguson Findley
- Produced by: Jerry Bresler
- Starring: Broderick Crawford; Betty Buehler; Richard Kiley
- Cinematography: Joseph Walker
- Edited by: Charles Nelson
- Music by: George Duning
- Color process: Black and white
- Production company: Columbia Pictures
- Distributed by: Columbia Pictures
- Release dates: September 21, 1951 (Buffalo); October 17, 1951 (New York); October 26, 1951 (Los Angeles)
- Running time: 86 minutes
- Country: United States
- Language: English
- Box office: $1,050,000

The Mob is a 1951 American crime thriller film noir produced by Columbia Pictures, directed by Robert Parrish and starring Broderick Crawford. The screenplay, which was written by William Bowers, is based the five-part Collier's magazine serial by Ferguson Findley titled "Waterfront".

== Plot ==
On a rainy night, detective Johnny Damico hears gunfire on a dark street and sees a gunman kneeling over a dead body. The gunman identifies himself as a detective from another precinct and then slips away. Damico discovers that the victim was a witness who was to have appeared before a grand jury investigating waterfront crime, and that the same man who shot him also murdered the chief investigator on the case just a few hours earlier. The badge that the gunman had displayed was that of the dead investigator. Damico could lose his job because of his error, but he is allowed the chance to redeem himself by the police commissioner and the district attorney.

Damico travels to New Orleans with instructions to pose undercover as a thug named Tim Flynn. When he returns home, Damico is assigned to discover the true identity of the head of the waterfront racketeers, known only as Blackie Clegg. Damico, posing as Flynn, takes a job as a longshoreman and makes connections with the mob's enforcers and the dockworkers. He is befriended by Tom Clancy, a longshoreman who lives at the same hotel. They frequently meet after work for drinks and are served by a bartender nicknamed Smoothie.

Union thug Joe Castro tries to frame Damico for murder by having his goon Gunner seize Damico's pistol to shoot and kill a potential stoolie. Damico, under the guise of Flynn, is arrested for the murder by a crooked police sergeant named Bennion, although police lieutenant Banks frees him when the murder gun is found to be a mismatch with that of Damico, who had switched guns, anticipating that he was being framed.

After following a false lead involving Clancy, Damico is given a tip by Smoothie, who offers to drive Damico to meet the elusive Blackie. At the base of operations, Damico is shocked when Smoothie reveals that he is Blackie, and Blackie wants to hire him to kill a witness named Damico, not knowing that Flynn is Damico. The criminals have kidnapped Damico's fiancée Mary and she has been cruelly interrogated by a brutal hood to reveal Damico's location, but Mary refuses to talk. A gunfight ensues and the hood is killed, but Blackie is wounded and escapes to a nearby hospital, where he is admitted under a new identity. Mary has been taken to the same hospital for treatment of her injuries. While Damico visits her, Blackie learns that they are in the hospital and confronts them in Mary's room. Blackie pulls a pistol, and just as he is preparing to kill Damico and Mary, a pair of police snipers stationed in an adjacent building shoot Blackie as he stands near the window.

== Cast ==
- Broderick Crawford as Johnny Damico
- Betty Buehler as Mary Kiernan
- Richard Kiley as Thomas "Tom" Clancy
- Otto Hulett as Lieutenant Banks
- Matt Crowley as Smoothie/Blackie Clegg
- Neville Brand as Gunner
- Ernest Borgnine as Joe Castro
- Frank DeKova as Culio
- Lynn Baggett as Peggy
- Jean Alexander as Doris
- Ralph Dumke as Police Commissioner
- John Marley as Tony
- Walter Klavun as Sgt. Bennion (uncredited)
- Charles Bronson as Jack (uncredited)
- Jay Adler as Russell (uncredited)
- Emile Meyer as Gas Station Attendant (uncredited)
- Duke Watson as Radford (uncredited)
- Carleton Young as District Attorney (uncredited)
- Harry Lauter as Daniels (uncredited)
- Lawrence Dobkin as Clegg's Doctor (uncredited)
- Robert Foulk as Thug Beating Mary (uncredited)

== Production ==
In October 1950, Columbia Pictures purchased the rights to Ferguson Findley's serial story "Waterfront", which had been published in Collier's magazine in five installments in July and August 1950.

The film began production under the working title of Remember That Face on January 11, 1951. and was completed on February 8, 1951. The retitling of the film as The Mob was announced in June.

== Release ==
The Mob opened in Buffalo, New York on September 12, 1951, with Broderick Crawford in attendance. For three months after the release of The Mob in late September 1951, Crawford conducted a 60-city nationwide promotional tour.

== Reception ==
In a contemporary review for The New York Times, critic Oscar Godbout wrote: "Crawford slouches through the film with gusty savor, playing the melodramatic highspots for all they are worth, and extracts as much tension and suspense as possible from an unpolished script. But the script, despite its shortcomings, hangs together as superior action. A bald melodrama, it makes no attempt to be pretty, and its violence is as exciting and as fast paced as you could ask for. The story is not unfamiliar, although it was more exciting as a magazine serial."

Critic Edwin Schallert of the Los Angeles Times wrote: "The presence or Crawford in this picture is its main asset. He does his role with robust ingenuity and plenty of emphasis on its amusing trimmings. ... The audience will have a good chance to guess the crime boss' identity, but they'll probably also have to be smart about it. At all events the picture keeps a nice balance because Crawford is ever on the edge of being detected in his sleuthing, if he isn't frequently suspected, so tightly controlled is the ring of crime. It's very good movie stuff, this picture, without being pretentious, and leading parts are excellently played ... The colorful character Crawford plays, especially when masquerading, is the life of this picture, and his meeting with a young lady on a date is particularly amusing."

The Mob ranked 122nd among American films at the box office for 1951.
