= The Crime Doctor (1934 film) =

1934 American crime drama directed by John Robertson

- Theatrical poster
- Directed by: John Robertson; Charles Kerr (assistant)
- Screenplay by: Jane Murfin
- Based on: The Big Bow Mystery; 1892 novel by Israel Zangwill
- Produced by: Merian C. Cooper; David Lewis
- Starring: Otto Kruger; Karen Morley; Nils Asther
- Cinematography: Lucien Andriot
- Edited by: William Hamilton
- Music by: Max Steiner
- Production company: RKO Radio Pictures
- Release date: April 27, 1934 (US)
- Running time: 75 minutes
- Country: United States
- Language: English

The Crime Doctor is a 1934 American pre-Code crime drama directed by John Robertson with a screenplay written by Jane Murfin, and adapted from the novel The Big Bow Mystery by Israel Zangwill. The film starred Otto Kruger, Karen Morley, and Nils Asther. RKO Radio Pictures produced and distributed the film which premiered April 27, 1934.

== Plot ==
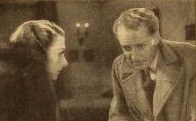
Kruger and Morley

When detective Dan Gifford arrives home he is surprised to find his wife, Andra, is attracted to famous crime novelist, Eric Anderson. In a fit of jealousy, he decides to write his own crime novel. When he overhears Andra on the phone with Anderson later that evening, he plans to commit the perfect murder and to frame Eric for it. In order to accomplish this, he hires Blanche Flynn, an ex-con, to rent the apartment above Eric's and to keep notes on Eric's activity. However, when Flynn sees Andra entering the apartment, she decides to take advantage. She approaches Anderson and blackmails him for $10,000 to keep the affair a secret. Eric agrees, and sets up a meeting with her the following evening to deliver the money.

When Dan finds out about the blackmail scheme, he realizes the perfect moment to hatch his own scheme has arrived. Offering to help Eric, he arranges for Eric to come to his office prior to the money exchange. With Eric on the way to Dan's office, Dan sneaks into Eric's apartment, and steals a gun, knowing that Eric keeps a gun collection. He then quickly goes down to Blanche's apartment, where he murders the young woman, after forcing her to write a note explaining that she was romantically involved with Eric, and implicating him in her murder.

With all the evidence pointing to him, Eric is convicted of the murder and sentenced to death. However, Dan's plan begins to fail when Andra refuses to accept the evidence, not believing that Eric is capable of such a heinous crime. When Dan understands the depth of his wife's feelings for Eric, he writes a note confessing to the murder and then commits suicide.

However, it is later revealed that the events of the contrived murder and subsequent events were all simply part of the book Dan had sat down to begin writing at the beginning of the film. None of it was real.

== Cast ==
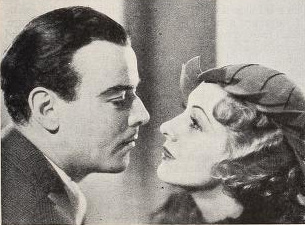
Screen capture of Asther and Morley from the film

- Otto Kruger as Dan Gifford
- Karen Morley as Andra Gifford
- Nils Asther as Eric Anderson
- Judith Wood as Blanche Flynn
- William Frawley as Fraser
- Donald Crisp as The D.A., Mr. Anthony
- Frank Conroy as Martin Crowder
- J. Farrell MacDonald as Kemp
- Fred Kelsey as Bloodgood
- G. Pat Collins as Walters
- Willie Fung as Wah-Sing

(cast list as per AFI database)

== Production ==
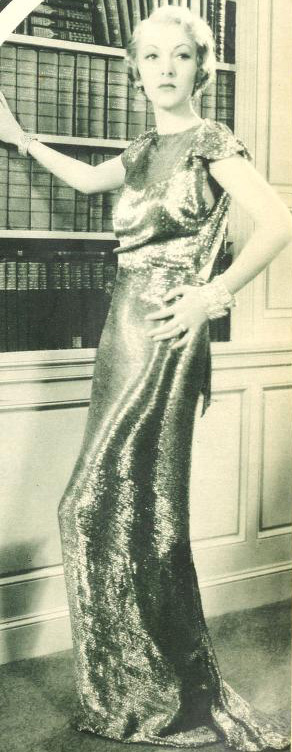
Publicity photo of Karen Morley for the film.

The film's producer, David Lewis, said that when pitched on the project Jane Murfin offered to write the screenplay as long as they would cast her husband Donald Crisp who was recovering from an illness. Lewis wrote "Jane wrote a beautiful script. She was a really fine craftsman. Her dialogue was good if not brilliant. The budget, although moderate, was larger than any I had had before."

In early January, 1934 it was reported that production on the film would begin before February 1 and production started on January 26. The following week, it was announced that the film would star Richard Dix and a young unknown actress, Ada Cavell, who RKO was touting as the next "Katharine Hepburn". In mid-January, John Robertson was announced as the film's director, with David Lewis being the supervising producer. While Dix was still mentioned as the leading male star, Wynne Gibson was cast as the second female lead, and Nils Asther was added as the second male lead.

Just before production began, it was announced that Otto Kruger would replace Dix in the cast, followed quickly by an announcement that Corinne Griffith was now going to be the female lead opposite him, replacing Mary Astor, who at some point had replaced Cavell. Griffith was a silent era star, and this film was to mark her first sound picture. At the same time it was reported that Judith Wood was replacing Wynne Gibson as the second female lead, and that William Frawley would join the cast.

It was revealed in late January that Jane Murfin would be given the writing assignment to turn Israel Zangwill's novel into a screenplay, and shortly after it was announced that Robert Tasker, a writer specializing in crime scripts, would assist on the script, although he is not given credit in the film. At the same time, it was announced that Judith Wood would be joining the cast.

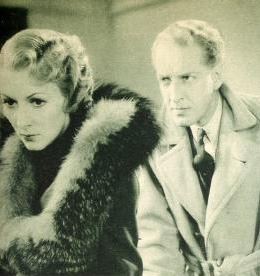
Screen capture of Morley and Kruger from the film.

Before the end of January, J. Farrell MacDonald, Samuel S. Hinds, and Irving Pichel would be joining the cast. While other contemporaneous sources continue to show Pichel as having been in the film, AFI cannot confirm their participation in the film. On January 30, Ethel Wales, Donald Crisp, and Willie Fung were added to the cast. A week after production began, in the beginning of February, Griffith left the show, due to stated creative differences between her, Kruger and Robertson. The studio was forced to throw out all the work done to that date, at a cost of approximately $10,000. She was replaced in the cast by Karen Morley, who RKO borrowed from MGM. At the same time that Morley replaced Griffith, it was announced that two other actors had been added late to the cast, Frank Conway and Wallis Clark. Filming on the picture was completed on February 14, 1934, and by February 26 the film was in the process of being edited.

Despite the retakes necessitated by the replacement of Griffith with Morley, the production on the picture was concluded two days ahead of schedule, and $11,000 under budget. Prior to its release in the theaters, a radio dramatization of the film was aired on the "45 Minutes to Hollywood" program, hosted by WABC, on March 24, 1934. In late March, it was announced that The Crime Doctor would be scheduled for an April 27 release, and it did open on April 27, 1934.

== Reception ==
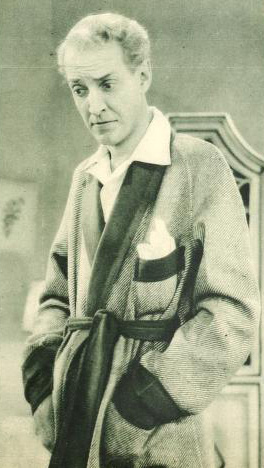
Screen capture of Otto Kruger from the film.

The Film Daily gave the film a good review, calling it an "Intriguing and suspenseful murder mystery and triangle drama smartly handled all around." They felt the plot was intricate and the film kept the tension going throughout, complimenting both Murfin for the script and Robertson on his direction. They also praised Lucien Andriot's cinematography. Modern Screen also gave the picture favorable press, stating it was "something new and very interesting in mysteries." Rating the film an overall "B", they singled out the performances of all four of the leads: Kruger, Asther, Morley, and Wood, calling Kruger's performance "outstanding". Motion Picture Daily enjoyed the film, saying it presented "an arresting and entertaining murder yarn with a surprise twist finish." They also enjoyed Robertson's direction, and the performances of the four leads.

Motion Picture Magazine called Kruger's performance one "you should not miss this month." They called the film "clever" and "tricky", and said about the actors, "Otto Kruger makes a famous detective almost unbearably poignant; Nils Asther makes an innocent man, grilled as a murderer, a human being in agony; and Karen Morley makes the emotions of both men plausible." Photoplay named it one of the best films of the month, and, like Motion Picture Magazine, named Kruger's performance one of the month's best. They called it "A pretty perfect picture, all about the perfect crime, with Otto Kruger, Karen Morley, and Nils Asther turning in pluperfect performances." The Motion Picture Herald gave the film a glowing review, calling it an "intriguing, entertaining picture." It went on to say,

In a novel way, it wraps up its amusement assets in a veil of semi-mystery and by the logical use of clever suspense moves to an odd climax that completely upsets all anticipations. Comedy tinged melodrama, therefore, is its essence, in which amusing thrill, not fear-mongering terror, predominates ...

Inasmuch as the reasons for the perfect crime, its accomplishments and the turmoil it brings on, are evident to them and the investigator—all the other participants being in the dark—it remains for the unexpected anti-climax to overturn advance solutions. As the picture is convincingly acted, there never once being a hint as to the finale, realism builds a suspense that not only maintains continuous interest but makes gleeful mincemeat of all the amateur sleuths' logical conclusions.

However, not all reviews were so glowing. While they were highly complimentary of the acting skills of the players, Picture Play Magazine found the film engrossing, but were disappointed in the film's ending, which they called "weak". Screenland was also less than enthusiastic about The Crime Doctor, while again praising the actors, but added "There's material here for an engrossing melodrama, but it needs a somewhat brisker pace and more 'punch' than are accorded it."

Lewis wrote, "The film really came off and previews were excellent. I can’t take too much credit; it was Jane's show... The film was a big success both financially and in bookings. The critics were laudatory—a little carping at the dream ending, but the audience loved that. It was a very professional job."

== See also ==
- The Verdict (1946)

== Notes ==
- Lewis, David (1993). Curtis, James (ed.). The Creative Producer. Metuchen: Scarecrow Press. ISBN 0-8108-2720-4.
