= Your Job in Germany =

1945 film by Frank Capra

- Directed by: Frank Capra (uncredited)
- Written by: Theodor S. Geisel (uncredited)
- Narrated by: Dana Andrews
- Release date: 1945
- Running time: 12 minutes 49 seconds
- Country: United States
- Language: English

Your Job In Germany is a short film made for the United States War Department in 1945 just before Victory in Europe Day (VE). It was shown to US soldiers about to go on occupation duty in Germany. The film was made by the military film unit commanded by Frank Capra and was written by Theodor Geisel, better known by his pen name Dr. Seuss. The narration is by Dana Andrews.

== Content ==
Your Job in Germany

The film was produced by the US Army Signal Corps. It was criticized by one commentator as a "bitter and angry anti-German propaganda film" that characterized the post-war German mind as "diseased".

The film urged against fraternization with the German people, who are portrayed as thoroughly untrustworthy. It reminds its viewers of Germany's history of aggression, under "Fuehrer Number 1" Otto von Bismarck, "Fuehrer Number 2" Kaiser Wilhelm II and "Fuehrer Number 3" Adolf Hitler. It argues that the German youth are especially dangerous because they had spent their entire lives under the Nazi regime.

The policy of non-fraternisation – where US soldiers were forbidden to speak even to small children – was first announced to the soldiers in the film:

The Nazi party may be gone, but Nazi thinking, Nazi training and Nazi trickery remains. The German lust for conquest is not dead. ... You will not argue with them. You will not be friendly. ... There will be no fraternization with any of the German people.

The basic theme that the German people could not be trusted derived from the peace policy that emerged from the Second Quebec Conference.

== Reception ==
The movie was first screened to the top US generals, including Dwight D. Eisenhower and John C. H. Lee. George Patton reportedly walked out of the screening he attended, saying "Bullshit!"

== Hitler Lives ==
Jack Warner, head of Warner Brothers, subsequently secured the rights to the movie and turned it into the short documentary Hitler Lives, which was released commercially on December 29, 1945, and won the 1946 Academy Award (Oscar) for Documentary Short Subject.

== In popular culture ==
Numerous sentences from the film's narration are incorporated verbatim as lyrics in the single "Don't Argue" by Cabaret Voltaire from their studio album Code (1987).

== See also ==
- Our Job in Japan, a companion film to Your Job In Germany also written by Geisel
- Here Is Germany
- Death Mills
- List of Allied propaganda films of World War II
- Sonderweg
