= Lynne Baggett =

American actress

Lynn Baggett
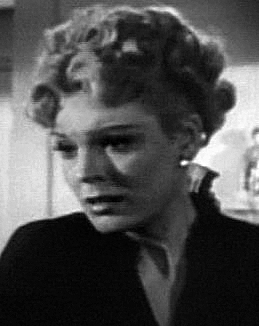
- Baggett in D.O.A. (1950)
- Born: Ruth Baggett; May 10, 1923; Wichita Falls, Texas, U.S.
- Died: March 22, 1960 (aged 36); Los Angeles, California, U.S.
- Resting place: Forest Lawn Memorial Park, Glendale, California, U.S.
- Occupation: Actress
- Years active: 1941–1951
- Spouse: Sam Spiegel (m. 1948; div. 1955)

Lynn Baggett (born Ruth Baggett; May 10, 1923 – March 22, 1960), also credited as Lynne Baggett, was an American actress.

== Early life ==
Lynn Baggett was born Ruth Baggett in Wichita Falls, Texas on May 10, 1923, to David L. Baggett, who worked the oil industry, and Ruth Baggett (née Simmons), who worked as a stenographer. Baggett sustained a head injury as a child that may have instigated her severe emotional and mental problems in her later life.

On July 25, 1942, Baggett was discovered on her way to the Harris Department Store by Steven "Solly" Baiano, the head of the Warner Bros. talent department. Anxious to sign her to a contract, Baiano had handwritten Baggett's first contract on Baker Hotel stationery, and advanced her $25 with the agreement she would arrive to the studio by August. As Baggett, at 19 years old, was considered a minor, her mother had to give her consent. There, she was signed to a three-year contract with the studio.

== Career ==
At Warner Bros, Baggett appeared in her first minor role in Manpower (1941) starring Edward G. Robinson, George Raft and Marlene Dietrich. Baggett spent the next several years in a number of uncredited roles including a chorus girl in Murder on the Waterfront (1943) and the oldest daughter of the title character in The Adventures of Mark Twain (1944). In her first film noir feature, Mildred Pierce (1945), she appeared as the dark-haired waitress who gets into an argument in an early scene about stealing tips.

Her only credited role for Warner Bros. was in the 1945 short drama Star in the Night. A modern-day retelling of the Nativity story, Baggett portrayed a pregnant Maria Santos who arrives with her husband José (Anthony Caruso) as they request lodging at a motel on Christmas Eve.

Outside of her acting career, Baggett was regularly used by Warner's publicity department, appearing in magazines and making guest appearances at U.S. military training bases. She was voted as "The Serpentine Lady" by U.S. military recruits at Kelly Field and was voted the "Triple-A-Girl" by those at Camp Haan, in which the A's stand for "adorable, amicable, and amorous."

In 1945, Baggett was screen tested for a role in The Stranger (1946), which was being produced by Sam Spiegel. She was not cast in the part, but enamored with her appearance, Spiegel signed Baggett to an acting contract with Universal Pictures. There, her first major supporting role was in The Time of Their Lives (1946), in which she played a fiancée to John Shelton's character. Her most notable film role was portraying Mrs. Phillips in D.O.A. (1950) opposite Edmond O'Brien. This was followed by The Flame and the Arrow (1950) and The Mob (1951).

Baggett was criticized for being difficult to work with and lacking intelligence. Playwright Arthur Laurents said of her: "She was very sweet, and very dumb". Leonora Hornblow described her as being "foolish, with no brains at all". She also added Baggett was an alcoholic and used cocaine. However, Joan Axelrod, the wife of playwright George Axelrod, spoke in defense, stating she was "very dear in spirit. Lynne had this wonderful laugh and a great kind of abandon about her. There was something so heartrending about it."

== Personal life ==
In 1945, Baggett met Polish-born film producer Sam Spiegel while she was screen tested for his next film The Stranger (1946). While she did not earn the role, Baggett and Spiegel began dating. On April 10, 1948, they were married in Las Vegas, with director John Huston and his wife Evelyn Keyes as witnesses.

Spiegel and Baggett were in an unhappy marriage full of fierceness and dishonesty. In November 1953, Baggett went to court asking for $3,685 per month in temporary alimony, claiming that Spiegel had abandoned her two years earlier. Two months later, Spiegel was ordered to pay her $500 in monthly payments.

Spiegel later alleged that Baggett had destroyed his property, including damaging most of his artwork collection and his suits. Baggett was in an affair with Irwin Shaw and John Huston, while Spiegel was busy working on The African Queen (1951).

Baggett divorced Spiegel in March 1955, three months after Baggett's release from prison following her conviction for felony hit-and-run.

=== 1954 hit and run ===
During the evening of July 7, 1954, Baggett was driving a Nash Rambler station wagon which she had borrowed from George Tobias, when she rear-ended another vehicle near Waring and Orlando Avenues in Los Angeles. Its passengers included five young boys returning from day camp, in which nine year-old Joel Watnick was thrown from the vehicle and instantly killed. Another boy, five year-old Anthony Fell, and an adult, Tom Sanderson, were also seriously injured.

After briefly examining the scene, Baggett testified she "blacked out" in fear, before leaving the scene. Baggett drove several miles before reaching a movie theatre where she calmed herself. Baggett had the damaged vehicle towed to a vacant lot in San Fernando Valley and telephoned an auto repair shop in Northridge to have the car towed there for repairs. The vehicle was stripped of its registration papers, but investigators identified the vehicle belonged to Tobias. He identified Baggett was the driver of the vehicle that evening, and police tracked her down two days later. On July 10, she was charged with felony hit and run driving and manslaughter. Baggett was released on a $5,000 bond paid for by Spiegel, with whom she had recently been estranged from.

In October 1954, her trial lasted ten days, in which she was acquitted for manslaughter but convicted for felony hit-and-run. In December of that year, Baggett was sentenced to 60 days in county jail and placed on three years' probation. Superior Judge Mildred Lillie remarked, "I cannot accept her story of a blackout and the jury couldn't believe it, either. She was extremely rational soon after the accident, and from then until she was arrested two days later, she used every resource at her command to get her car repaired and to conceal her identity."

While serving her sentence, on New Year's Eve, Baggett told United Press International (UPI) correspondent Aline Mosby: "I still don't feel I belong here, but in a way, the judge did me a favor." The next month, on January 20, 1955, Baggett was released from prison having served 50 days, which was reduced for "good behavior". The Los Angeles Times reported she had mopped the floors, served as a waitress, washed dishes, and served in the linen room. Baggett told the publication her jail sentence was "memorable — a sort of minor college" and she had hoped to revive her acting career. Baggett and Tobias paid more than $40,000 due to six civil suits filed against them.

== Death ==
Baggett had a history of severe depression, substance abuse and mental problems. On June 7, 1959, she attempted suicide by overdosing on sleeping pills, but called the telephone operator for help moments before passing out. She was saved by police who had to remove the hinges from the back door.

Two months later, in August, Baggett claimed her foldaway bed had collapsed on top of her, trapping her underneath for six days. A friend of hers had found Baggett dressed in a nightgown and apparently suffering from delusions, and called for the police. Baggett was rushed to the UCLA Medical Center dehydrated, malnourished, and was paralyzed from the knees down. Her story appeared to have been made up, in which a neighbor verified that Baggett was fine a few days before. Baggett was later sent to a psychiatric ward at the Los Angeles General Medical Center for observation.

On March 23, 1960, Baggett was found dead in her Hollywood apartment by her nurse, at the age of 36. She had been found stretched across the bed with her hands on the floor. Nearby "orange tablets and blue and white capsules" were found. Her nurse told local police that Baggett had requested she was not to be disturbed until later in the day as "she wanted to get a lot of rest." Variety columnist Army Archerd wrote that close friends of Baggett believed it was an accidental overdose as she had sent them a happy note a week prior, stating she was on the path to recovery and was financially secure.

Spiegel at first refused to pay for her funeral, but eventually reconsidered despite not attending. Baggett is interred at the Forest Lawn Memorial Park in Glendale, California.

== Filmography ==
Year	Title	Role	Notes	Ref.
1941	Manpower		Uncredited	
1943	Air Force	Nurse	Uncredited	
1943	Three Cheers for the Girls	Brunette Chorus Girl	Short; Uncredited	
1943	Murder on the Waterfront	Backstage Chorus Girl	Uncredited	
1943	Thank Your Lucky Stars	Miss Latin America	Uncredited	
1944	In Our Time	Friend of Count Orvid	Uncredited	
1944	Grandfather's Follies		Short	
1944	The Adventures of Mark Twain	Susie Clemens	Uncredited	
1944	Hollywood Canteen	Junior Hostess	Uncredited	
1945	Roughly Speaking	Salesgirl	Uncredited	
1945	Pillow to Post	Traveller	Uncredited	
1945	Rhapsody in Blue	Guest	Uncredited	
1945	Mildred Pierce	Waitress	Uncredited	
1945	Star in the Night	Maria Santos	Short; credited as Lynne Baggett	
1945	Confidential Agent	Singer	Uncredited	
1946	Cinderella Jones	Junior Leaguer	Uncredited	
1946	One More Tomorrow	Party Guest		
1946	Janie Gets Married	Hostess	Uncredited	
1946	Night and Day	Sexy woman	Uncredited	
1946	The Time of Their Lives	June Prescott	Credited as Lynne Baggett	
1946	The Time, the Place and the Girl	Nurse	Uncredited	
1949	D.O.A	Mrs. Phillips		
1950	The Flame and the Arrow	Francesca	Credited as Lynne Baggett	
1951	The Mob	Peggy Clancy	Credited as Lynne Baggett	

== Bibliography ==
- Fraser-Cavassoni, Natasha (2003). Sam Spiegel. New York: Simon & Schuster. ISBN 978-1-439-17095-3.
- Wagner, Laura (2020). "Lynne Baggett". Hollywood's Hard-Luck Ladies: 23 Actresses Who Suffered Early Deaths, Accidents, Missteps, Illnesses and Tragedies. McFarland. pp. 5–10. ISBN 978-1-476-63833-1.
