= Star in the Night =

1945 American short drama film

- Title card
- Directed by: Don Siegel
- Screenplay by: Saul Elkins; Don Siegel
- Story by: Robert Finch
- Produced by: Gordon Hollingshead
- Starring: J. Carrol Naish; Donald Woods; Rosina Galli; Dick Erdman; Lynn Baggett; Johnny Miles; Tony Caruso
- Cinematography: L. Robert Burks, A.S.C.
- Edited by: Rex Steele
- Music by: William Lava
- Distributed by: Warner Bros. Pictures, Inc.
- Release date: October 13, 1945
- Running time: 22 minutes
- Country: United States
- Language: English

Star in the Night is a 1945 American short drama film directed by Don Siegel and starring J. Carrol Naish, Donald Woods and Rosina Galli. The film was Siegel's directorial debut, and won an Oscar in 1946 for Best Short Subject (Two-Reel). The film is a modern-day retelling of the Nativity story, set on Christmas Eve at a desert motel in the Southwestern United States.

== Plot ==
Christmas Eve in a lonely desert in the Southwestern United States: Three riding cowboys have just bought out Christmas presents from a store, although they actually don't need them. One of the cowboys says that he just had the feeling that he should buy gifts to give them to someone. The cowboys see a flashing star in the distance, which they ride over to investigate. The star is actually a second hand star, used by the Italian-American Nick Catapoli for his little motel in the desert. A mysterious hitchhiker appears at Nick's motel who states that he just wants to come in from the cold for a little while. Nick and the Hitchhiker have a discussion about Christmas. While the hitchhiker tries to explain the true meaning of Christmas with love, goodwill and brotherhood, Nick opposes the holiday; he thinks that people behave badly during most of the year, but then try to behave in a fake-friendly way at Christmas. Nick shows the hitchhiker his motel customers as examples: Miss Roberts complains about the noise of Christmas carolers; the businessman Mr. Dilson is furious about the shirt-cleaning service that Nick uses and a traveling couple demands to get extra blankets for their room.

A young Mexican-American couple, Jose and Maria Santos, arrives at the motel hoping to get lodging. There are no cabins available, so Nick's wife Rosa accommodates them in a small shed next to the hotel. Maria is expecting a baby and is in a somewhat critical condition without a doctor. When the motel lodgers find out about Maria's approaching birth they try to help her. The lodgers forget their selfishness and now react in a social way. For example, the businessman who was angry about the poor work of the laundry on his "expensive shirt", now insists that his shirts be torn up to make bandages for the delivery when none can be located ("These will make the best bandages in the world!"), tearing up the first one himself, the couple demanding extra blankets use them for the baby while the woman complaining about the chorus singing carols asks what she can do to help.

After the successful birth, the three cowboys appear at the motel and give their presents to the child. Nick learns that there is still goodness in the world and is now positive about Christmas. He even gives the hitchhiker, who observed the situation, a cup of coffee and his coat. He wishes "Merry Christmas" to the hitchhiker who now leaves the hotel. At the end, Nick sees on the wall calendar how much the birth of the child in his shed resembles the Nativity Story and cries.

== Cast ==
- J. Carrol Naish as Nick Catapoli
- Donald Woods as the Hitchhiker
- Rosina Galli as Rosa Catapoli
- Dick Erdman as one of three cowboys (riding middle)
- Lynn Baggett as Maria Santos
- Johnny Miles as one of three cowboys (riding left)
- Tony Caruso as José Santos

Uncredited (in order of appearance)

- Virginia Sale as Miss Roberts, guest complaining about noise made by carolers
- Irving Bacon as Mr. Dilson, businessman complaining about his shirts
- Dick Elliott as traveling husband, insisting on having more blankets
- Claire Du Brey as traveling wife, dissatisfied with the quality of the place
- Cactus Mack as one of three cowboys (riding right)

== Background ==
The short film Star in the Night deals with a modern retelling of the Nativity story and also adds some elements from A Christmas Carol to it. Saul Elkins wrote the screenplay; the story was by Robert Finch. Produced with a rather small budget and character actors, it was the directorial debut of Don Siegel, who later directed thriller feature films like Dirty Harry. Previously Siegel had worked as a Warner Bros. montage and second unit director. The cinematography was by a young Robert Burks who later worked for Alfred Hitchcock.

In 1946, Star in the Night won an Academy Award for Best Short Subject (Two-Reel) at the 18th Academy Awards. The Academy Award for Best Short Documentary Film was won by Hitler Lives, also directed by Don Siegel. After his success with both shorts he went on to make feature films.

On December 16, 1948, the radio program Hallmark Playhouse featured a 30-minute adaptation re-titled “The Desert Shall Rejoice,” starring film actor John Hodiak as Nick. The radio version used most of the same basic story elements (e.g., the Nativity story; how Rosa decided to marry Nick) but with substantially revised dialogue and one significant new story element.

== See also ==
- List of Christmas films
