= They Met in Bombay =

1941 film by Clarence Brown

- Original poster
- Directed by: Clarence Brown
- Written by: Edwin Justus Mayer; Anita Loos; Leon Gordon
- Story by: John H. Kafka
- Produced by: Hunt Stromberg
- Starring: Clark Gable; Rosalind Russell; Peter Lorre
- Cinematography: William H. Daniels
- Edited by: Blanche Sewell
- Music by: Herbert Stothart
- Production company: Metro-Goldwyn-Mayer
- Distributed by: Loew's Inc.
- Release date: June 27, 1941
- Running time: 92 minutes
- Country: United States
- Language: English
- Budget: $1.38 million
- Box office: $2.51 million

They Met in Bombay is a 1941 American adventure drama film directed by Clarence Brown and starring Clark Gable, Rosalind Russell and Peter Lorre. The film was produced by Metro-Goldwyn-Mayer and takes place at the outbreak of fighting in the Second World War in Asia.

== Plot ==
Gerald Meldrick (Clark Gable) and "Baroness" Anya von Duren (Rosalind Russell) are jewel thieves working separately in Bombay (now Mumbai) in British-ruled India. He's posing as a Lloyd's of London detective, while she's pretending to be an aristocrat. Both are after a priceless diamond, the Star of Asia, owned by the aging Duchess of Beltravers (Jessie Ralph) and set for public display at a social function.

When Gerald and Anya meet, neither sees through the other's fake identity, but his amorous curiosity about her soon leads him to do a little digging and figure things out. He tricks her into stealing the jewel, then surrendering it to him to avoid prosecution. She quickly catches on that he is a con artist like herself, and she angrily goes after him, but by then both are being sought by the law. They are forced to team up and flee Bombay. Police Inspector Cressney (Matthew Boulton), who had been in charge of the jewel's security, doggedly pursues them, vowing revenge for the way he was outwitted.

The two thieves stow away on a freighter bound for British-ruled Hong Kong, with the connivance of the dishonest captain, Chang (Peter Lorre). On the voyage, Gerald and Anya learn about each other's backgrounds, become friends and eventually begin to fall in love. They begin to distrust Chang, even though they are unaware that he has guessed their identities, contacted Inspector Cressney by radio and agreed to hand them over for a large reward. When the ship arrives in Hong Kong waters on a foggy night, the pair slip away in a rowboat before Cressney and his men arrive to make the arrest, infuriating the inspector once again.

The fugitive couple plan to sneak out of Hong Kong and the British Empire as soon as possible, eventually finding a way to sell the diamond. Gerald, a Canadian who was once in the British military before he turned to a life of crime, obtains an army uniform and assumes the identity of a captain, as part of a scheme to loot money being held in a court dispute. But their plans are upset when the Japanese invade Guangdong Province, and British troops are mobilized to possibly confront them. Gerald is given the job of evacuating Chaing Ling province. On the way there, he plans to duck out and head off in a car with Anya, so he informs his second-in-command that he will be leaving on a private mission and will put the idealistic young soldier in charge. Gerald believes the evacuation will go smoothly with few problems. At Chaing Ling, Gerald meets the evacuees, Europeans and Chinese. When the evacuation is set, Gerald meets up with Anya at the car she has acquired. But as they prepare to leave, the Japanese arrive in aggressive fashion.

Rather than flee, Gerald stays and confronts the Japanese commander, who forbids him to evacuate the Chinese refugees. Gerald vows to protect them and calls up the Winnipeg Grenadiers to form a barrier between the Japanese and the Chinese evacuees. The Japanese back down and the convoy leaves, with Anya in one of the trucks. But on the road, the Japanese attack, killing many Grenadiers and refugees. With his troops pinned down by Japanese machine guns overlooking the road, Gerald shows resourcefulness and bravery by taking a handful of grenades and racing to outflank the Japanese. He manages to knock out the Japanese position, being wounded in the process. Some days later, having recovered, he waits for release from a British hospital in Hong Kong so he and Anya can finally disappear with their stolen diamond. As he leaves to get his things, Anya is seen admiring his uniform.

Gerald is summoned before the battalion, where he is awarded the Victoria Cross for courage by General Allen in a filmed ceremony. Gerald is told that his exploits have become part of British legend, an inspiration for soldiers of the Empire for all time. Gerald is truly moved by this, but is also conflicted about his lies and life of crime. As Gerald is walking out, he is nabbed by Inspector Cressney, who has never given up on catching him. Gerald smiles and appears to give up. The inspector takes Gerald into General Allen's office, where Anya is waiting. General Allen says now knows about Gerald's criminal past, but still sees him as a hero. It turns out that Anya, who has changed her viewpoint on life, is the one who told General Allen and summoned Cressney so Gerald could come clean, accept punishment and start life fresh.

The inspector, who has no sympathy, marches Gerald out, planning to handcuff him once they leave the base. But Gerald, still known to local troops as an army officer, orders a column of passing soldiers to arrest Cressney and take him to jail, despite the inspector's furious protests that they are assisting a criminal. Gerald and Anya get into a military vehicle and leave the army base.

Inspector Cressey, after being freed, is phoning police from the general's office while the general looks on in amusement. Cressney vows to arrest Gerald whatever it takes. However, as he is leaving the office, Gerald and Anya walk in. Gerald tells the flabbergasted inspector that he could have run out on him, but he couldn't run out on Anya. They inform the inspector that they are married, and they hand him the stolen jewel. The delighted general shakes Gerald's hand. Gerald hands the general his Victoria Cross, and asks the general to keep it for him until he comes back to enlist. The general is very happy to do so, knowing the courts will go easy on the war hero.

Looking at the famed medal for valor, General Allen says: "I would give up the Star of Asia for this any day." Gerald hugs Anya and says, "Yeah, that's what we think, too."

== Cast ==
- Clark Gable as Gerald Meldrick
- Rosalind Russell as Anya Von Duren
- Peter Lorre as Captain Chang
- Jessie Ralph as Duchess of Beltravers
- Reginald Owen as General Allen
- Matthew Boulton as Inspector Cressney
- Eduardo Ciannelli as Giovanni Riccio, Hotel Manager
- Luis Alberni as Maitre d'hotel
- Rosina Galli as Carmencita 'Rosa'
- Jay Novello as Bolo
- David Clyde as Sergeant
- Harry Allen as Soldier in Saloon
- Philip Ahn as Japanese officer

== Notes ==
Gable was planning to star with Lana Turner as Anya Von Duren in The Uniform in December 1940. Turner was replaced by Russell, and the film was released as They Met in Bombay.

== Box office ==
According to MGM records, the film earned $1,554,000 in the United States and Canada and $961,000 in other markets, resulting in a profit of $350,000.

== Bibliography ==
- Fetrow, Alan G. Feature Films, 1940-1949: a United States Filmography. McFarland, 1994.
