= Betty Buehler =

American actress (1921–2012)

- Born: December 10, 1921
- Died: July 6, 2012 (aged 90)
- Education: Columbia University (BA)
- Occupation: Actress

Maria Elizabeth Buehler de Lutz (December 10, 1921 – July 6, 2012) was an American film actress.

Buehler was from Gloversville, New York, the daughter of Gustave Buehler, a baker and German immigrant. She attended Fort Plain High School, Fort Plain, New York, and graduated from Columbia University with a BA degree.

Buehler's professional stage debut came with the Washington Square Players in Hamlet.

Her work on television led to her having a film contract. Max Arnow, a talent scout for Columbia, saw her on TV and arranged a screen test, after which she had a long-term contract with Columbia. She made her film debut in the noir crime thriller The Mob (1951) alongside Broderick Crawford. She had an uncredited part in the 1953 film Taxi and then disappeared from the film industry.

== Filmography ==
- The Mob (1951)
- Taxi (1953)
