= Joan Lorring =

American actress

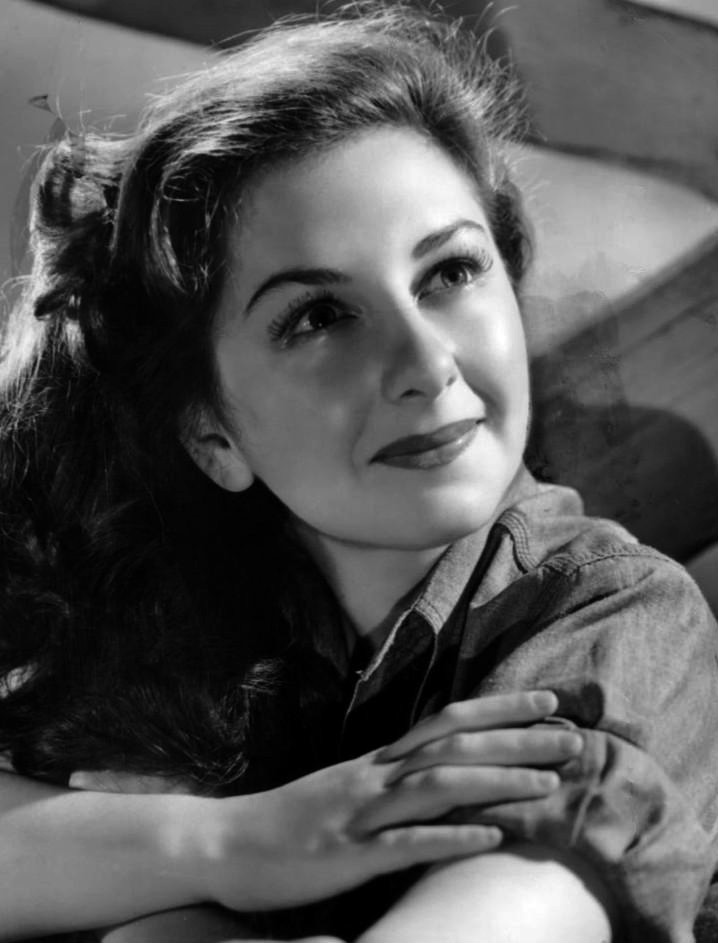
- Lorring in 1946
- Born: Madeline Ellis; April 17, 1926; British Hong Kong
- Died: May 30, 2014 (aged 88); Sleepy Hollow, New York, U.S.
- Other name: Dellie Ellis
- Occupation: Actress
- Years active: 1944–1980
- Spouse: Martin Sonenberg (m. 1956; died 2011)
- Children: 2

Joan Lorring (born Madeline Ellis; April 17, 1926 – May 30, 2014) was an American actress and singer known for her work in film and theatre. For her role as Bessy Watty in The Corn Is Green (1945), Lorring was nominated for the Academy Award for Best Supporting Actress. Lorring also originated the role of Marie Buckholder in Come Back, Little Sheba on Broadway in 1950, for which she won a Donaldson Award (an early version of the Tony Award).

== Early years ==
Lorring was born in Hong Kong. Her family fled Hong Kong in 1941 following the Japanese invasion, traveling by boat to Honolulu, and then landing in San Francisco. Soon after, they moved to Los Angeles and Madeleine (known by her nickname "Dellie") began working as a child actress in radio and film – she was credited as "Dellie Ellis" when she played the title role in the radio program A Date With Judy (1942). She eventually adopted Joan Lorring as her stage name.

== Radio ==
Lorring began her career as a child actress on the radio. Her performances include Alma Horrell in the Suspense episode "The Great Horrell", aired on August 22, 1946, and "The Farmer Takes a Wife".

== Theatre ==
Lorring made her Broadway debut in 1950, originating the role of Marie Buckholder opposite Shirley Booth in Come Back Little Sheba. Terry Moore later played Marie in the 1952 film version. For this role, Lorring won a Donaldson Award for Most Outstanding Female Debut in the 1949–1950 Broadway season. This success led to her performing in the 1951 Broadway production of the Lillian Hellman play The Autumn Garden. In 1954, she performed in the play Dead Pidgeons, and her last Broadway appearance was in 1957, originating the role of The Young Woman, opposite Kim Stanley as The Woman, in A Clearing in the Woods by Arthur Laurents.

In 1970, Lorring performed in an Off-Broadway production of Awake and Sing! as Bessie Berger.

== Film and television ==
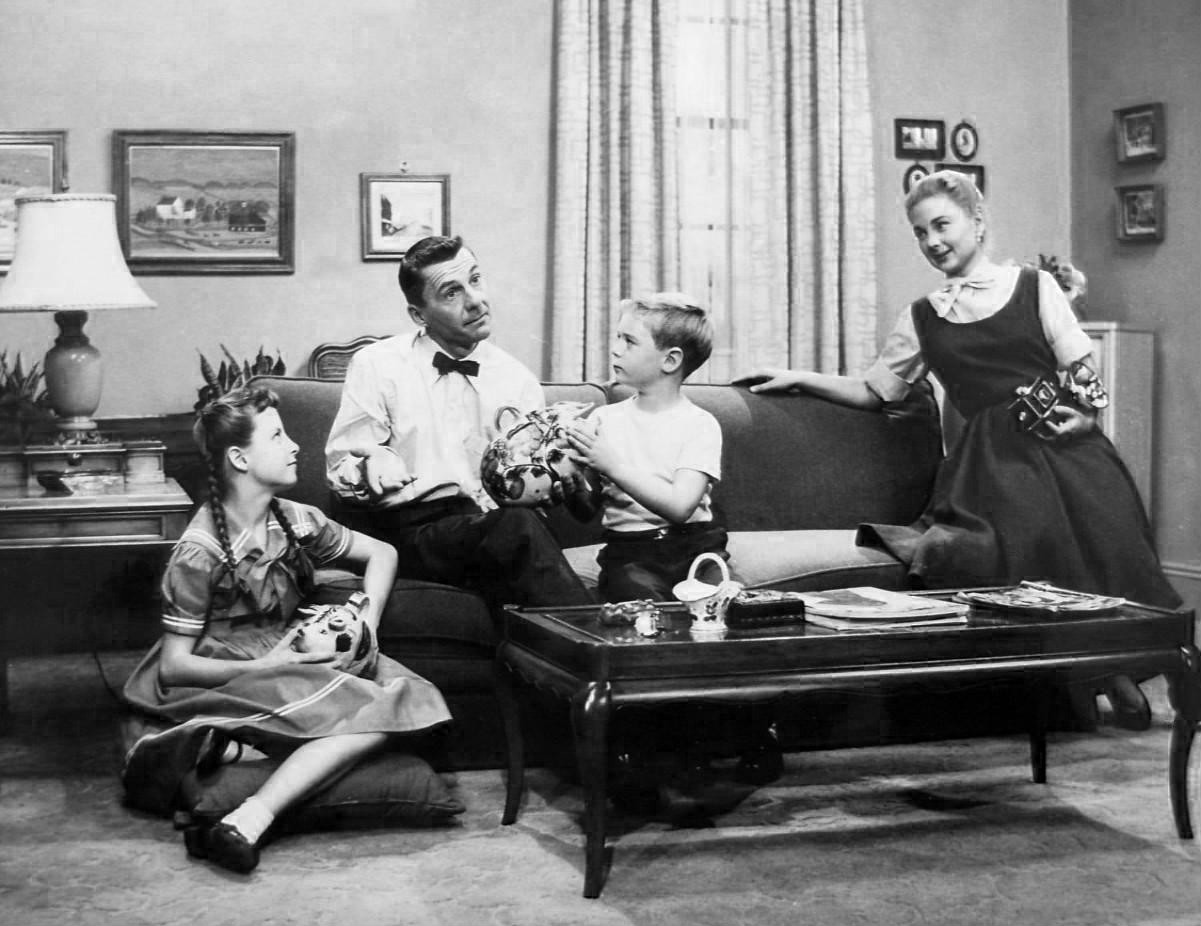
Joan Lorring (far right) and cast on the set of Norby

Lorring made her film debut at age 18 in Song of Russia (1944). Her second film was the Oscar-nominated drama The Bridge of San Luis Rey.

For her third film role as Bessy Watty in 1945's The Corn Is Green opposite Bette Davis as Miss Moffat, Lorring (at age 19) was nominated for the Academy Award for Best Supporting Actress. Thelma Schnee had originated the role of Bessy on Broadway opposite Ethel Barrymore in 1940.

Lorring next had supporting roles in the 1946 dramas Three Strangers and The Verdict, in which she plays Lottie Rawson and performs the song "Give Me a Little Bit". In 1947, she appeared in The Other Love, a drama that stars Barbara Stanwyck, and in The Lost Moment which stars Susan Hayward. In 1948, she played a supporting role in Good Sam, which stars Gary Cooper and was directed by Leo McCarey.

In the early 1950s, Lorring began appearing often on television. In 1955, she performed in 13 episodes of the television series Norby as Helen Norby. The show lasted one season. Also in 1956, she reprised her award-winning role as Bessy in The Corn is Green on television opposite Eva Le Gallienne as Miss Moffat. She appeared on one episode of Alfred Hitchcock Presents, (The Older Sister, 1956) about Lizzie Borden, in which she portrayed her sister Emma.

Lorring performed infrequently in the 1960s and 1970s focusing on her family life. Her last film role came in 1974 with The Midnight Man, and her later television roles were guest-starring for several episodes as Anna Pavel in Ryan's Hope and a 1980 episode of The Love Boat.

== Personal life ==
Loring was married to cancer researcher and Professor of Medicine and Professor of Biochemistry at Cornell Medical School, and Chief of Endocrinology at Memorial Sloan Kettering Cancer Center, Martin Sonenberg. The couple had two daughters, Santha and Andrea.

== Retirement and death ==
Lorring enjoyed a quiet retirement through the 1980s and 1990s. She lived until May 30, 2014, when she died in Sleepy Hollow, New York at age 88 from natural causes. She was not included in the In-Memoriam segment at the 87th Academy Awards.

== Filmography ==
Film
Year	Title	Role	Notes
1944	Song of Russia	Sonia	
1944	The Bridge of San Luis Rey	Pepita	
1945	The Corn Is Green	Bessie Watty	Nominated - Academy Award for Best Supporting Actress
1946	Three Strangers	Icey Crane	
1946	The Verdict	Lottie Rawson	
1947	The Other Love	Celestine Miller	
1947	The Lost Moment	Amelia	
1947	The Gangster	Dorothy	
1948	Good Sam	Shirley Mae	
1951	The Big Night	Marion Rostina	
1952	Imbarco a mezzanotte	Angela	English title: Stranger on the Prowl
1974	The Midnight Man	Judy	
Television
Year	Title	Role	Notes
1950–1956	Robert Montgomery Presents		5 episodes
1952	The Philco Television Playhouse		Episode: The Thin Air
1952	The Doctor		Episode: No Story Assignment
1954	The Motorola Television Hour		Episode: A Dash of Bitters
1954	Love Story		Episode: For All We Know
1954	Danger		Episode: The Big Man
1954	Suspense		Episode: The Last Stand
1954	Center Stage	Terry Clayborn	Episode: The Day Before Atlanta
1953, 1955	Goodyear Television Playhouse		Episode: The Rumor; Episode: The Prizewinner
1954–1955	Valiant Lady	Bonnie Withers #1	
1954–1955	Westinghouse Studio One	Blair; Terry	Episode: Castle in Spain; Episode: Millions of Georges
1955	Norby	Helen Norby	
1955	The Elgin Hour	Maggie	Episode: Black Eagle Pass
1955	Kraft Television Theatre		Episode: Coquette
1955	Appointment with Adventure		Episode: Return of the Stranger
1956	Star Stage		Episode: Of Missing Persons
1956	Alfred Hitchcock Presents	Emma Borden	Season 1 Episode 17: "The Older Sister"
1956	General Electric Theater		Episode: The Shunning
1965	The Nurses	Jean Bower	Episode: Act of Violence
1965	For the People	Jean Bow	Episode: Act of Violence (2)
1966	The Star Wagon	Martha	PBS TV-Movie
1979–1980	Ryan's Hope	Anna Pavel	
1980	The Love Boat	Mrs. Cummings	Episode: Tell Her She's Great..., (final appearance)

== Radio appearances ==
Date	Program	Episode/source	Role	Notes
June 23 to September 15, 1942 (second season)	A Date with Judy	Entire season	Judy	Credited as "Dellie Ellis". Sponsored by Pepsodent
August 2, 1945	Suspense	"A Man in the House"	Emily Barrett	
August 22, 1946	Suspense	"The Great Horrell"	Alma Horrell	
1953	Best Plays	"The Farmer Takes a Wife"		
December 3, 1961	Suspense	"Luck of the Tiger Eye"		
June 2, 1965	ABC's Theatre-Five	"Noose of Pearls"	Maude	
July 27, 1965	ABC's Theatre-Five	"I Spy Sister Sairey"	Amy and Sairey	Dual role as "split personalities."
January 12, 1974	CBS Radio Mystery Theater	"I Warn You Three Times"		
January 15, 1974	CBS Radio Mystery Theater	"The Resident"		
January 28, 1974	CBS Radio Mystery Theater	"Three Women"		
February 4, 1974	CBS Radio Mystery Theater	"The Lady Was a Tiger"		
March 7, 1974	CBS Radio Mystery Theater	"The Creature from the Swamp"		
March 20, 1974 to January 19, 1976	CBS Radio Mystery Theater	Numerous appearances		
