= Israel Zangwill =

British author (1864–1926)

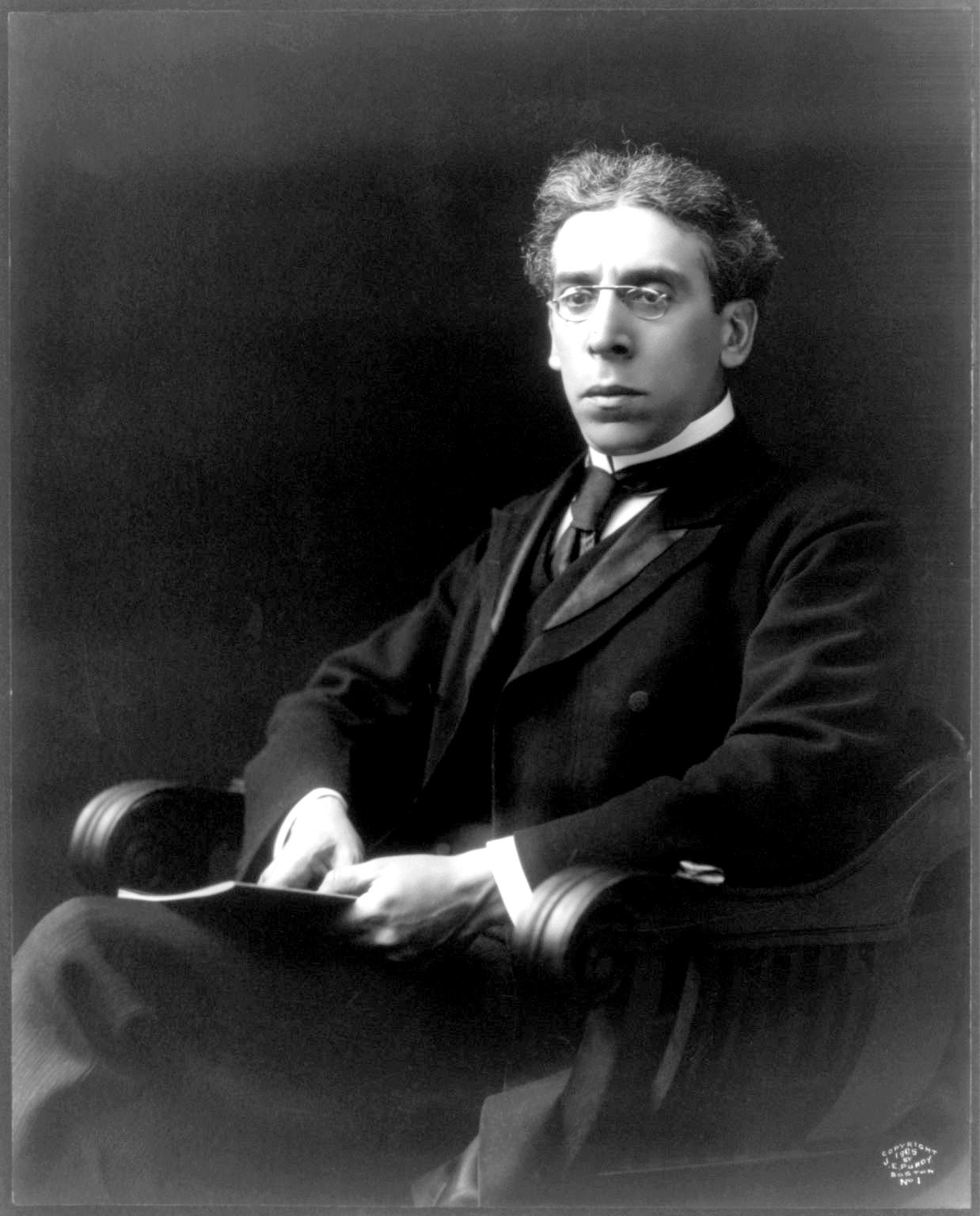
- Zangwill in 1905
- Born: 21 January 1864; London, England, United Kingdom
- Died: 1 August 1926 (aged 62); Midhurst, West Sussex, England, United Kingdom
- Spouse: Edith Ayrton
- Writing career
- Notable works: The Big Bow Mystery (1892); The Melting Pot (1908)

Signature
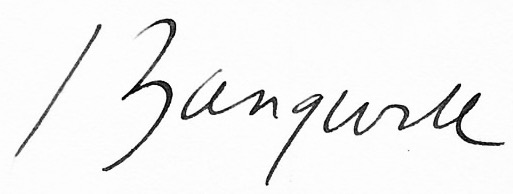

Israel Zangwill (21 January 1864 – 1 August 1926) was a British author at the forefront of Zionism during the late 19th century, and as such was a close associate of Theodor Herzl. He later rejected the search for a Jewish homeland in Palestine and became the prime thinker behind the Jewish territorial movement.

== Early life and education ==
Zangwill was born in Whitechapel, London, on 21 January 1864, in a family of Jewish immigrants from the Russian Empire. His father, Moses Zangwill, was from what is now Latvia, and his mother, Ellen Hannah Marks Zangwill, was from what is now Poland. He dedicated his life to championing the cause of people he considered oppressed, becoming involved with topics such as Jewish emancipation, Jewish assimilation, territorialism, Zionism, and women's suffrage. His brother was novelist Louis Zangwill.

Zangwill received his early schooling in Plymouth and Bristol. When he was eight years old, his parents moved to Spitalfields, East London and he was enrolled in the Jews' Free School there, a school for Jewish immigrant children. The school offered a strict course of both secular and religious studies while supplying clothing, food, and health care for the scholars; presently one of its four houses is named Zangwill in his honour. At this school he excelled and even taught part-time, eventually becoming a full-fledged teacher.

While teaching, he studied for his degree from the University of London, earning a BA with triple honours in 1884.

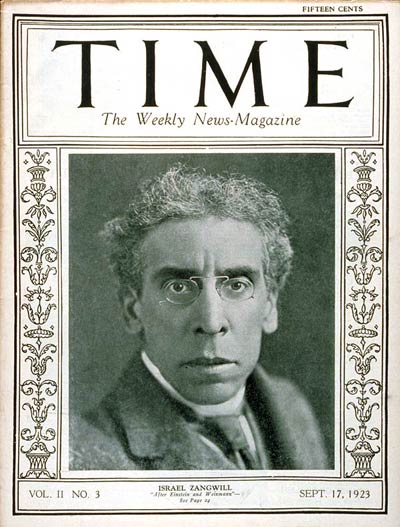
Time magazine cover, 17 September 1923

== Writings ==
Zangwill published some of his works under the pen-names J. Freeman Bell (for works written in collaboration), and Countess von S. and Marshallik.

He had already written a tale entitled The Premier and the Painter in collaboration with Louis Cowen, when he resigned his position as a teacher at the Jews' Free School owing to differences with the school managers and ventured into journalism. He initiated and edited Ariel, The London Puck, and did miscellaneous work for the London press.

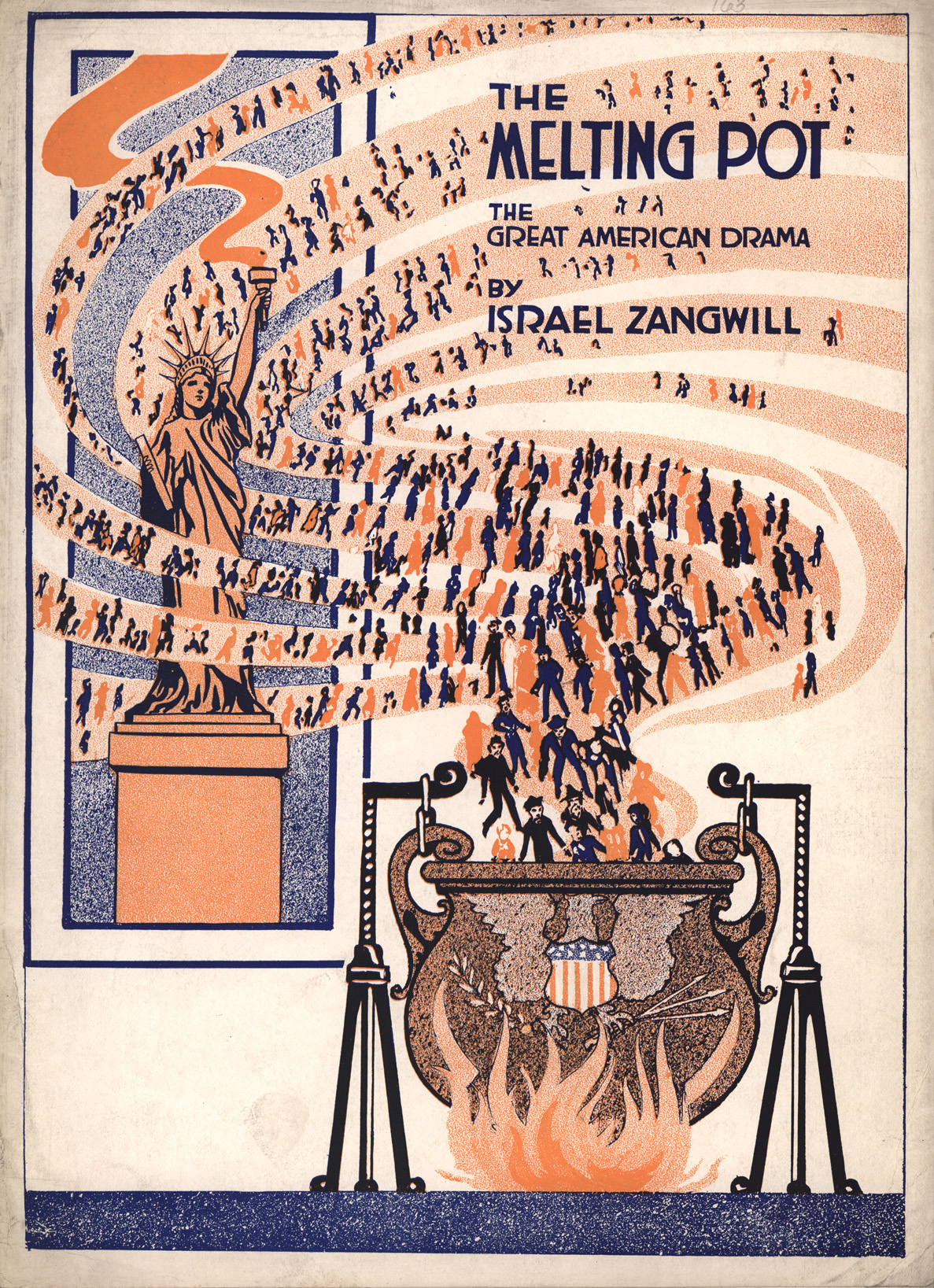
Theatre Programme for the play The Melting Pot (1916).

Zangwill's work earned him the nickname "the Dickens of the Ghetto". He wrote a very influential novel Children of the Ghetto: A Study of a Peculiar People (1892), which the late 19th-century English novelist George Gissing called "a powerful book".

The use of the metaphorical phrase "melting pot" to describe American absorption of immigrants was popularised by Zangwill's play The Melting Pot, a success in the United States in 1909–10. The theatrical work explored the themes of ethnic tensions and the idea of cultural assimilation in early 20th-century America.

When The Melting Pot opened in Washington, D.C., on 5 October 1908, former President Theodore Roosevelt leaned over the edge of his box and shouted "That's a great play, Mr. Zangwill. That's a great play." In 1912, Zangwill received a letter from Roosevelt in which Roosevelt wrote of The Melting Pot "That particular play I shall always count among the very strong and real influences upon my thought and my life."

The protagonist of the play is David Quixano, a Russian Jewish immigrant who arrives in New York City after the Kishinev pogrom, in which his entire family is killed. He writes a great symphony named "The Crucible" expressing his hope for a world in which all ethnicity has melted away, and becomes enamored of a beautiful Russian Christian immigrant named Vera. The dramatic climax of the play is the moment when David meets Vera's father, who turns out to be the Russian officer responsible for the annihilation of David's family. Vera's father admits guilt, the symphony is performed to accolades, and David and Vera agree to wed and kiss as the curtain falls.

"Melting Pot celebrated America's capacity to absorb and grow from the contributions of its immigrants." Zangwill was writing as "a Jew who no longer wanted to be a Jew. His real hope was for a world in which the entire lexicon of racial and religious difference is thrown away."

However, the play also addresses the challenges and conflicts that arise when different ethnic groups collide. It portrays the tensions between the Jewish and Christian communities, as well as the struggles of immigrants to find their place in a new society while preserving their cultural heritage.

"The Melting Pot" resonated with audiences during its time, as it captured the spirit of the American immigrant experience and explored issues of assimilation, identity, and the potential for a unified nation. The play contributed to the discourse on multiculturalism and the American identity, and it remains a significant work in the context of American theater and the portrayal of ethnic tensions on stage.

Zangwill wrote many other plays, including, on Broadway, Children of the Ghetto (1899), a dramatization of his own novel, directed by James A. Herne and starring Blanche Bates, Ada Dwyer, and Wilton Lackaye; Merely Mary Ann (1903) and Nurse Marjorie (1906), both of which were directed by Charles Cartwright and starred Eleanor Robson. Liebler & Co. produced all three plays as well as The Melting Pot. Daniel Frohman produced Zangwill's 1904 play The Serio-Comic Governess, featuring Cecilia Loftus, Kate Pattison-Selten, and Julia Dean. In 1931, Jules Furthman adapted Merely Mary Ann for a movie with Janet Gaynor.

Zangwill's simulation of Yiddish sentence structure in English aroused great interest. He also wrote mystery works, such as The Big Bow Mystery (1892), and social satire, such as The King of Schnorrers (1894), a picaresque novel (which became a short-lived musical comedy in 1979). His Dreamers of the Ghetto (1898) includes essays on famous Jews such as Baruch Spinoza, Heinrich Heine and Ferdinand Lassalle.

The Big Bow Mystery was one of the first locked room mystery novels. It has been almost continuously in print since 1891 and has been used as the basis for three movies.

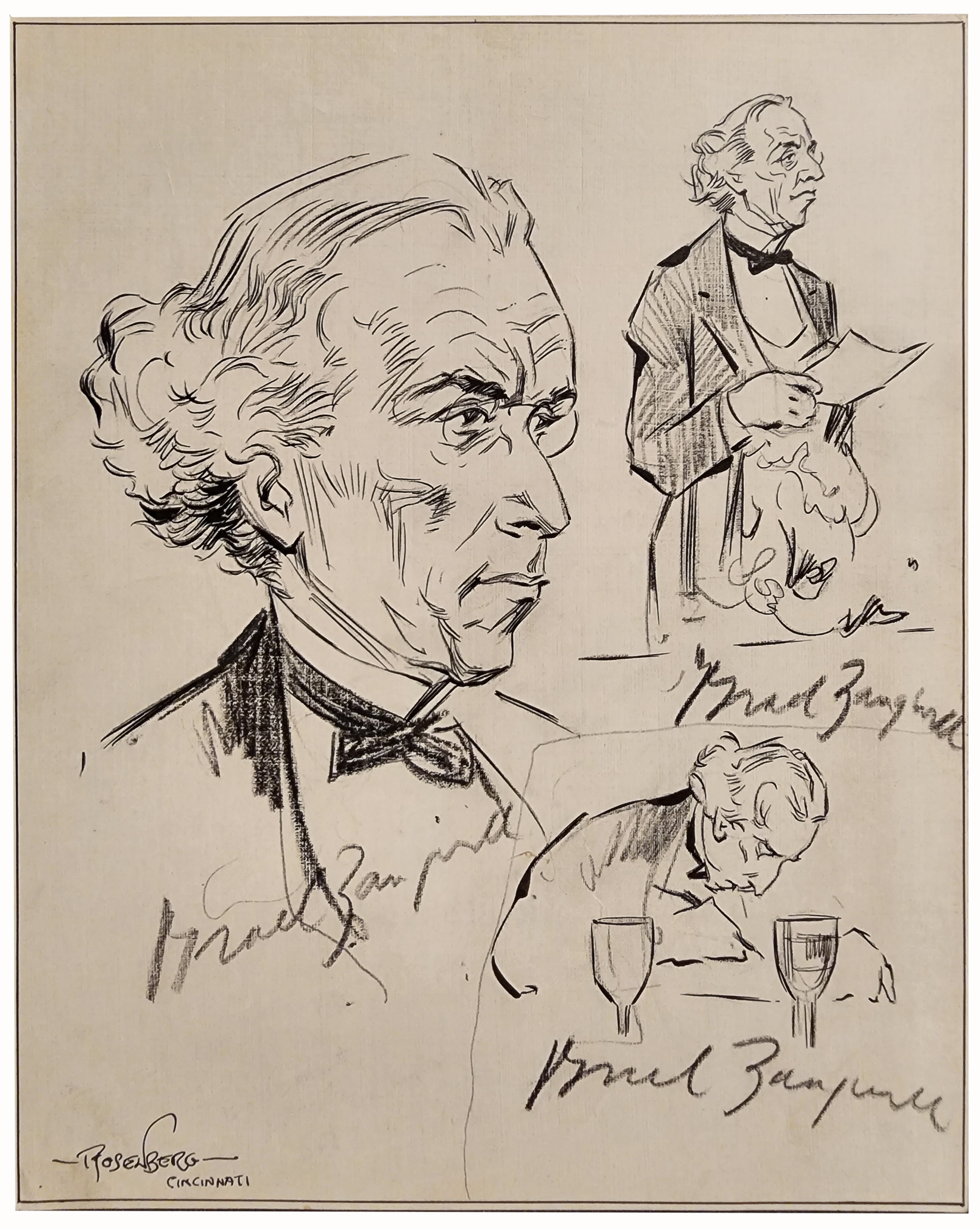
Signed drawing by Manuel Rosenberg 1924

Another much produced play was The Lens Grinder, based on the life of Spinoza.

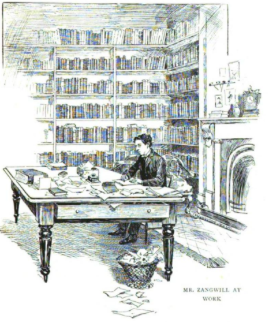
Israel Zangwill by his friend and illustrator George Wylie Hutchinson

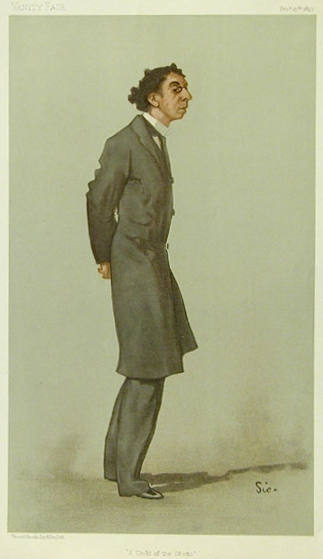
"A Child of the Ghetto" Zangwill as caricatured by Walter Sickert in Vanity Fair, February 1897.

== Zionism and territorialism ==
Zangwill was also involved with specifically Jewish issues as an assimilationist, an early Zionist, and a territorialist. Jewish territorialism was a political movement that emerged as a response to the rise of virulent antisemitism in Europe during the early years of the 20th century. It proposed the establishment of a Jewish homeland outside of Palestine, offering alternative solutions to the ongoing debate about Jewish self-determination and Zionism.

Zangwill for a time endorsed the efforts of Theodor Herzl, including presiding over a meeting at the Maccabean Club in London that was addressed by Herzl in November 1895, and endorsing the main Palestine-oriented Zionist movement. But in 1905, Zangwill changed his mind and founded his own organization, called the Jewish Territorialist Organization, advocating a Jewish homeland in whatever land might be available in the world which could be found for them, with speculations including Canada, Australia, Mesopotamia, Uganda and Cyrenaica.

Zangwill is inaccurately known for creating the slogan "A land without a people for a people without a land" describing Zionist aspirations in the Biblical land of Israel. He did not invent the phrase; he acknowledged borrowing it from Lord Shaftesbury. In 1853, during the preparation for the Crimean War, Shaftesbury wrote to Foreign Secretary Aberdeen that Greater Syria was "a country without a nation" in need of "a nation without a country.... Is there such a thing? To be sure there is, the ancient and rightful lords of the soil, the Jews!" In his diary that year he wrote "these vast and fertile regions will soon be without a ruler, without a known and acknowledged power to claim dominion. The territory must be assigned to some one or other.... There is a country without a nation; and God now in his wisdom and mercy, directs us to a nation without a country." Shaftesbury himself was echoing the sentiments of Alexander Keith, D.D.

In 1901, in the New Liberal Review, Zangwill wrote that "Palestine is a country without a people; the Jews are a people without a country".

Theodor Herzl got along well with Israel Zangwill and Max Nordau. They were both writers or 'men of letters'. In November 1901 Zangwill was still misreading the situation: "Palestine has but a small population of Arabs and fellahin and wandering, lawless, blackmailing Bedouin tribes." To conclude his opening address to the Article Club, Zangwill pretended to speak as the weary, Ashkenazic folktale character, the Wandering Jew, saying, "restore the country without a people to the people without a country... For we have something to give as well as to get. We can sweep away the blackmailer – be he Pasha or Bedouin – we can make the wilderness blossom as the rose, and build up in the heart of the world a civilization that may be a mediator and interpreter between the East and the West."

In 1902, Zangwill wrote that Palestine "remains at this moment an almost uninhabited, forsaken and ruined Turkish territory". However, within a few years, Zangwill had "become fully aware of the Arab peril", telling an audience in New York, "Palestine proper has already its inhabitants. The pashalik of Jerusalem is already twice as thickly populated as the United States" leaving Zionists the choice of driving the Arabs out or dealing with a "large alien population". He moved his support to the Uganda scheme, leading to a break with the mainstream Zionist movement by 1905.

In 1908, Zangwill told a London court that he had been naive when he made his 1901 speech and had since "realized what is the density of the Arab population", namely twice that of the United States. In 1913 he criticized those who insisted on repeating that Palestine was "empty and derelict" and who called him a traitor for reporting otherwise.

According to the Revisionist Zionist Ze'ev Jabotinsky, Zangwill told him in 1916 that, "If you wish to give a country to a people without a country, it is utter foolishness to allow it to be the country of two peoples. This can only cause trouble. The Jews will suffer and so will their neighbours. One of the two: a different place must be found either for the Jews or for their neighbours".

In 1917, he wrote "'Give the country without a people,' magnanimously pleaded Lord Shaftesbury, 'to the people without a country.' Alas, it was a misleading mistake. The country holds 600,000 Arabs."

By 1919, Zangwill believed that in order for there to be a Jewish homeland in Palestine, its existing Arab inhabitants would have to leave, ideally voluntarily, though realistically he realized Arabs wouldn't leave voluntarily.

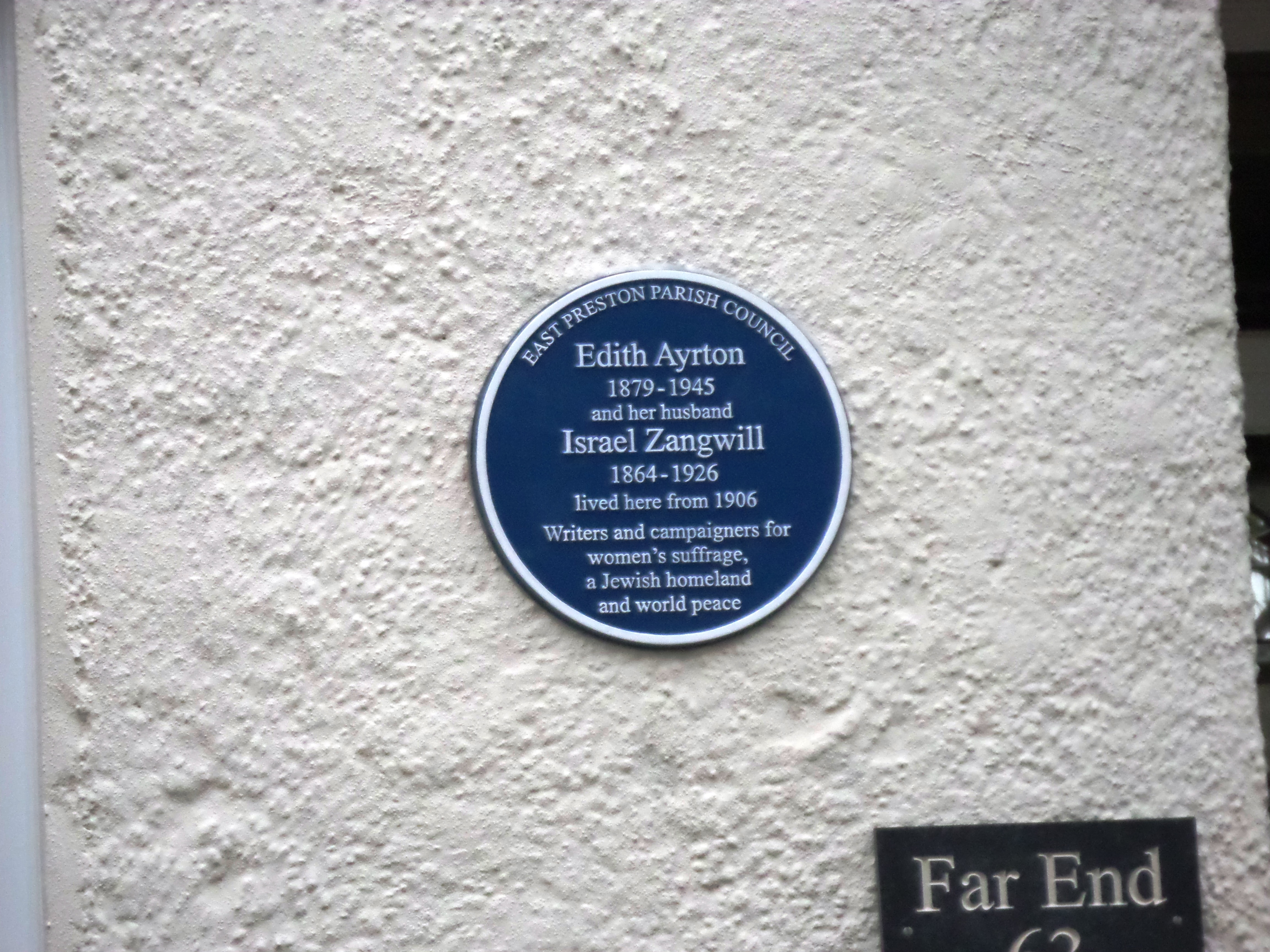
Far End, East Preston, West Sussex

In 1921, Zangwill suggested Lord Shaftesbury "was literally inexact in describing Palestine as a country without a people, he was essentially correct, for there is no Arab people living in intimate fusion with the country, utilizing its resources and stamping it with a characteristic impress: there is at best an Arab encampment, the break-up of which would throw upon the Jews the actual manual labor of regeneration and prevent them from exploiting the fellahin, whose numbers and lower wages are moreover a considerable obstacle to the proposed immigration from Poland and other suffering centers".

== Other views ==
In his writings, Zangwill expressed mixed sentiments about the then-territory of Palestine, parts of which became the modern State of Israel in 1948, two decades after his death. After the establishment of the state, Philip Rubin speculated that the new state might have met his aspirations.

He was an early suffragist.

During World War I, he advocated the formation of a Jewish foreign legion to the central powers.

"The League of Damnations" is a term associated with Zangwill's critique of the anti-Semitic sentiment prevalent in Europe during his time. He used this phrase to describe the collective hostility and discrimination faced by Jewish people in various countries. Zangwill was an ardent opponent of anti-Semitism and used his writings to expose and challenge the prejudices and injustices faced by Jews.

Zangwill endorsed feminism and pacifism, but his greatest effect may have been as a writer who popularised the idea of the combination of ethnicities into a single, American nation. The hero of his widely produced play The Melting Pot proclaims: "America is God's Crucible, the great Melting-Pot where all the races of Europe are melting and reforming...Germans and Frenchmen, Irishmen and Englishmen, Jews and Russians – into the Crucible with you all! God is making the American."

== Personal life ==
Zangwill married Edith Ayrton in 1903. She was a feminist and author, and the daughter of cousins William Edward Ayrton and Matilda Chaplin Ayrton. Ayrton's stepmother was Hertha Ayrton, who, like Zangwill, was Jewish.

The Zangwill family lived for many years in East Preston, West Sussex in a house named Far End. The couple had three children, two sons and a daughter. The younger of their two sons was the British psychologist Oliver Zangwill.

Zangwill died of pneumonia on 1 August 1926 at a nursing home in Midhurst, West Sussex. He had spent two months at the nursing home.

== Other works ==
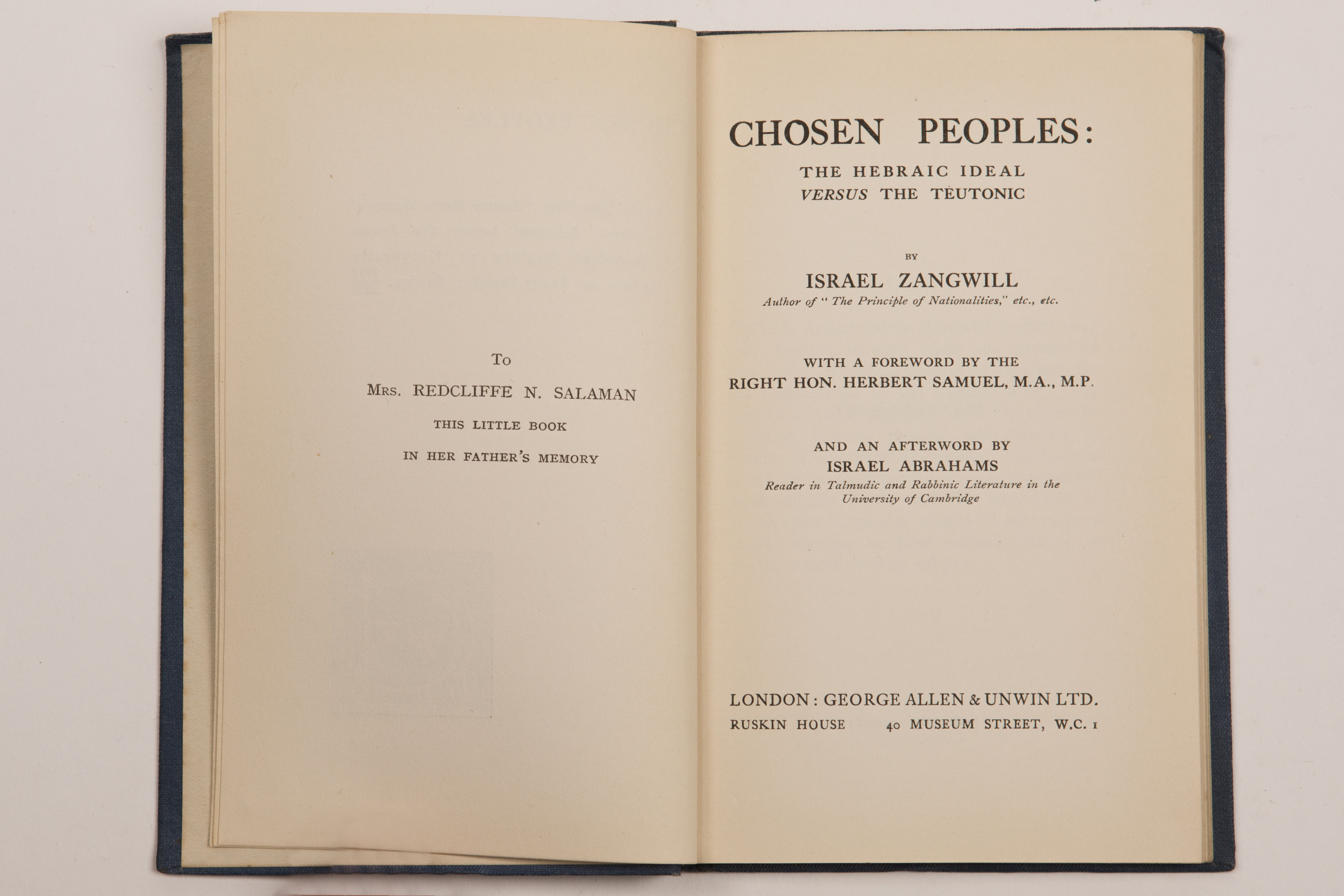
Chosen Peoples: Publication of a lecture by Israel Zangwill at the London Jewish Historical Society, 1918, in the collection of the Jewish Museum of Switzerland.

- The Bachelors' Club (London : Henry, 1891)
- The Old Maid’s Club (1892)
- The Big Bow Mystery (1892)
- Merely Mary Ann (1893) (London: Raphael Tuck & Sons, illustrated by Mark Zangwill)
- The King of Schnorrers (1894)
- The Master (1895) (based on the life of friend and illustrator George Wylie Hutchinson)
- Without Prejudice (1896)
- The Mantle of Elijah (London: Heinemann 1900)
- The Grey Wig: Stories and Novelettes (1903) which include The Grey Wig; Chasse-Croise; The Woman Beater; The Eternal Feminine; The Silent Sisters; Merely Mary Ann
- Merely Mary Ann (1904) – Separate edition with photo illustrations from the stage production
- The Serio-Comic Governess (1904)
- Nurse Marjorie (1906)
- The Melting Pot (1908)
- Italian Fantasies (1910)
- The Next Religion (1912)
- The Principle of Nationalities (1917)
- Chosen Peoples (1919)

As translator:

- Selected Religious Poems of Solomon ibn Gabirol; pub. The Jewish Publication Society of America (1923)

The "of the Ghetto" books:

- Children of the Ghetto: A Study of a Peculiar People (1892)
- Grandchildren of the Ghetto (1892)
- Dreamers of the Ghetto (1898)
- Ghetto Tragedies, (1899)
- Ghetto Comedies, (1907)

== Filmography ==
- Children of the Ghetto, directed by Frank Powell (1915, based on the play Children of the Ghetto)
- The Melting Pot, directed by Oliver D. Bailey and James Vincent (1915, based on the play The Melting Pot)
- Merely Mary Ann, directed by John G. Adolfi (1916, based on the play Merely Mary Ann)
- The Moment Before, directed by Robert G. Vignola (1916, based on the play The Moment of Death)
- Mary Ann, directed by Alexander Korda (Hungary, 1918, based on the play Merely Mary Ann)
- Nurse Marjorie, directed by William Desmond Taylor (1920, based on the play Nurse Marjorie)
- Merely Mary Ann, directed by Edward LeSaint (1920, based on the play Merely Mary Ann)
- The Bachelor's Club, directed by A. V. Bramble (1921, based on the novel We Moderns)
- We Moderns, directed by John Francis Dillon (1925, based on the play We Moderns)
- Too Much Money, directed by John Francis Dillon (1926, based on the play Too Much Money)
- Perfect Crime, directed by Bert Glennon (1928, based on the novel The Big Bow Mystery)
- Merely Mary Ann, directed by Henry King (1931, based on the play Merely Mary Ann)
- The Crime Doctor, directed by John S. Robertson (1934, based on the novel The Big Bow Mystery)
- The Verdict, directed by Don Siegel (1946, based on the novel The Big Bow Mystery)

== Bibliography ==
- Adams, Elsie Bonita (1971). Israel Zangwill. New York: Twayne.
- Gross, John (December 1964). "Zangwill in Retrospect". Commentary. 38.
- Guigui, Jacques Ben (1975). Israel Zangwill: Penseur el Ecrivain 1864–1926. Toulouse: lmprimerie Toulousaine-R.Lion.
- Mantle, Burns; Sherwood, Garrison P., eds. (1944). The Best Plays of 1899–1909. Philadelphia: The Blakiston Company.
- Nahshon, Edna. From the Ghetto to the Melting Pot: Israel Zangwill's Jewish Plays. Wayne State University Press.
- Rochelson, Meri-Jane (2008). A Jew in the Public Arena: The Career of Israel Zangwill. Detroit: Wayne State University Press.
- Udelson, Joseph H. (1990). Dreamer of the Ghetto: The Life and Works of Israel Zangwill. Tuscaloosa: University of Alabama Press.
- Vital, David (October 1984). "Zangwill and Modern Jewish Nationalism". Modern Judaism. 4 (3): 243–253. doi:10.1093/mj/4.3.243. JSTOR 1396299.
- Vital, David (1999). A People Apart: The Jews in Europe 1789–1939. Oxford: Oxford Modern History.
- Wohlgelernter, Maurice (1964). Israel Zangwill: A Study. New York: Columbia University Press.

Awards and achievements
| Preceded by Jack Dempsey | Cover of Time Magazine; 17 September 1923 | Succeeded by John Pierpont Morgan, Jr. |
