= Ferguson Findley =

American novelist

Ferguson Findley (1910–1963) was the pen name of Charles Weiser Frey, an American novelist from Pennsylvania. He wrote several minor crime novels in the 1950s, the most successful of which, Waterfront, was adapted into the film The Mob in 1951.

== Novels ==
- My Old Man’s Badge (also published as: Killer Cop) (1950)
- Hire This Killer (1951)
- Waterfront (UK Title: Remember That Face!) (1951)
- The Man in the Middle (UK Title: A Handful of Murder) (also published as: Dead Ringer) (1952)
- Counterfeit Corpse (1956)
- Murder Makes Me Mad (1956)
