= Louis Zangwill =

English novelist

Louis Zangwill (July 25, 1869 – 1938) was an English novelist; born at Bristol, England. He was educated at Jews' Free School, and for a time acted as teacher there, but left together with his brother, Israel Zangwill, and set up a printing establishment. Afterward, however, he turned to literature, and produced, under the pseudonym "Z. Z.," "A Drama in Dutch" (London, 1894), which attracted some attention for its local color. It was followed by "The World and a Man" (1896), "The Beautiful Miss Brooke" (1897), and "Cleo the Magnificent" (1899), all distinguished by a certain realistic vividness and somewhat cynical sense of humor. He also produced a more sympathetic study, "One's Womenkind" (London, 1903).

Zangwill distinguished himself at one time as a chess player.
