= Oliver Zangwill =

British neuropsychologist

Oliver Louis Zangwill
- Born: 29 October 1913; Littlehampton, West Sussex
- Died: 12 October 1987 (aged 73)
- Education: University of Cambridge
- Spouse(s): Joy Moult (1947-1975); Shirley Tribe
- Awards: Fellow of the Royal Society
- Scientific career
- Fields: Psychology
- Workplaces: University of Cambridge

Oliver Louis Zangwill FRS (29 October 1913 – 12 October 1987) was a British neuropsychologist. He was Professor of Experimental Psychology, University of Cambridge, 1952–1981, and then professor emeritus. His father was author Israel Zangwill; his mother was author Edith Ayrton, whose parents were physicist William Edward Ayrton and physician Matilda Chaplin. He was elected a Fellow of the Royal Society in 1977.

== Early life ==
Zangwill was born in Littlehampton, West Sussex, England. He was educated at University College School, London, and then at the University of Cambridge, where he was a member of King's College. He received his Bachelor of Arts in 1935 and his MA in 1939, having completed the Natural Sciences Tripos, Part I in 1934 (Class 2), and the Moral Sciences Tripos (which then combined philosophy and psychology), Part II in 1935, being awarded 1st class honours with special distinction.

== Career ==
- Research Student, Cambridge Psychological Laboratory, 1935–40
- Psychologist, Brain Injuries Unit, Edinburgh, 1940–45
- Assistant Director, Institute of Experimental Psychology, Oxford, 1945–52
- Senior Lecturer in General Psychology, University of Oxford, 1948–52
- Professorial Fellow, 1955–87, Supernumerary Fellow, 1981-7, King's College, Cambridge

As Professor of Experimental Psychology at Cambridge, Zangwill occupied a position of influence. This was partly because, in that era, the norm for UK academic departments was to have only a single faculty member with the title "Professor", who was also permanent head of department, and Experimental Psychology was the only branch of the discipline to have a university department at Cambridge. He was active both in the Experimental Psychology Society (of which he was a founder member and convenor of the founding meeting) and the British Psychological Society. It can be argued that his influence in the two societies helped prevent their sometimes conflicting perspectives from leading to an open rift. He was always ready to advise and support those setting up new psychology degrees as the discipline spread through UK universities in the 1950s and 1960s, and served many departments as an external examiner both of undergraduate programmes and of PhD candidates. As a result he exerted considerable influence at a period when UK psychology was expanding rapidly.

Zangwill's research interests were mainly in neuropsychology, particularly brain lateralisation, at a time when these topics were not particularly fashionable. Much of his research was based at the National Hospital for Nervous Diseases, Queen Square, London (now part of the National Hospital for Neurology and Neurosurgery), and he was always interested in the links between research and treatment. Self-deprecating about his own research, he saw himself as someone who could provide encouragement and support to others, and the renaissance of neuropsychology in the United Kingdom from the 1970s on owes much to his influence. As the professor and head of department at Cambridge, he also saw it as his responsibility to supervise any PhD students whose interests did not correspond to those of any of his colleagues. For example, he supervised the work of Liam Hudson, an unlikely member of an Experimental Psychology department, who nonetheless acknowledges his debt to him and describes him as, "a scholarly, preoccupied, subtle, and at times startlingly insightful, person".

Recognising the part Zangwill played in the development of care for patients with neurological disorders, the East Cambridgeshire and Fenland NHS Primary Care Trust has named a research and treatment unit, the Oliver Zangwill Centre for Neuropsychological Rehabilitation, in his honour. This Centre has now formed part of Cambridgeshire PCT.

Zangwill was married twice, to Joy Moult (married 1947, divorced 1975) and to Shirley Tribe (married 1976). With his first wife he had a son, David, who died in an accident as a baby; he later adopted his second wife's son Jeremy.

== Other positions held ==
- Visiting Psychologist, National Hospital for Nervous Diseases, London, 1947–79
- Honorary Consulting Psychologist to United Cambridge Hospitals, 1969–1987
- Editor, Quarterly Journal of Experimental Psychology, 1958–66
- President: Section J, British Association for the Advancement of Science, 1963
- President: Experimental Psychology Society, 1962–63
- President: British Psychological Society, 1974–75
- Member of the Biological Research Board, Medical Research Council, 1962–66

== Publications ==
- An Introduction to Modern Psychology, 1950
- Cerebral Dominance and its relation to psychological function, 1960
- Current Problems in Animal Behaviour, 1961 (Edited, with William H. Thorpe)
- Amnesia, 1966, 2nd edn 1977
- Lateralisation of Language in the Child, 1981
- Handbook of Psychology, vol. 1, General Psychopathology, 1982
- The Oxford Companion to the Mind, 1987 (Edited, with Richard L. Gregory (ISBN 0-19-866124-X)

== Bibliography ==
- Hudson, L. (1972). The cult of the fact. New York: Harper & Row. Excerpted at
- The Oliver Zangwill Centre homepage
