= Merely Mary Ann (1920 film) =

1920 film

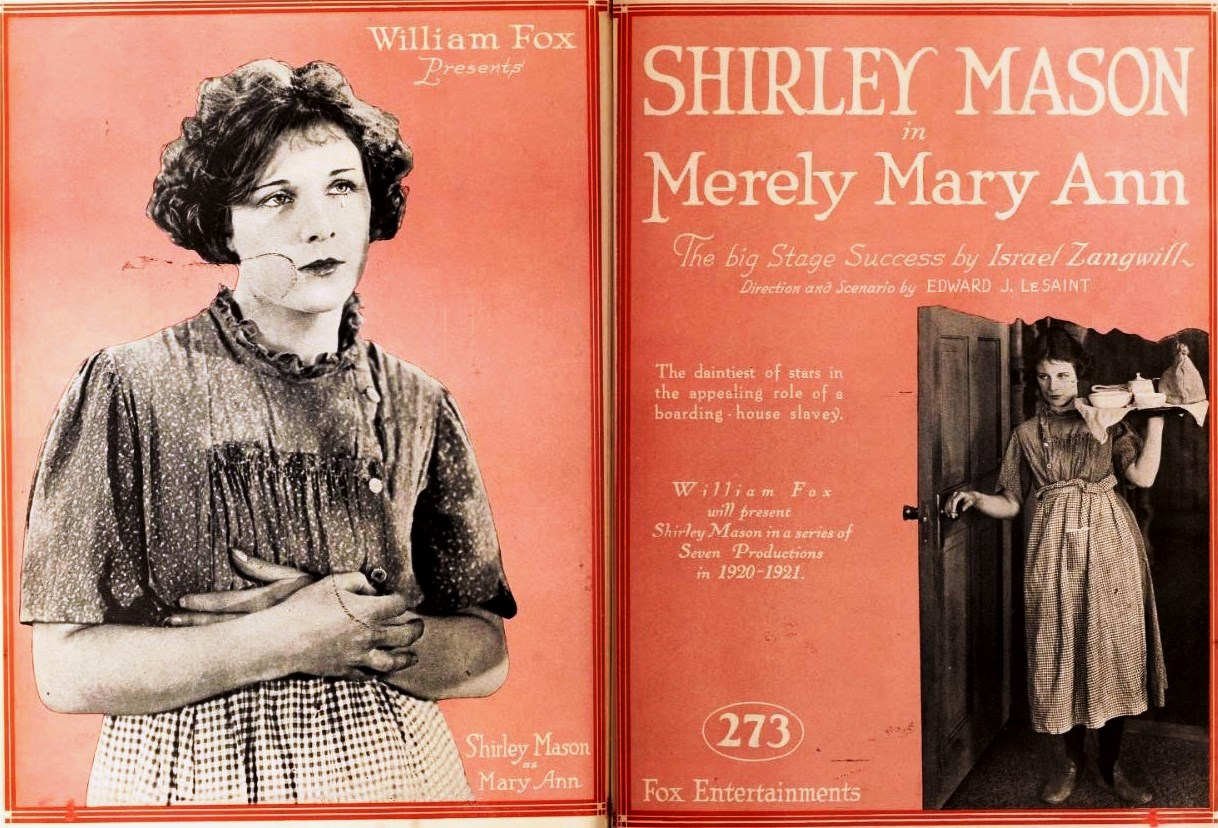
- advertisement
- Directed by: Edward J. Le Saint
- Written by: Edward J. Le Saint
- Based on: Merely Mary Ann by Israel Zangwill (1903)
- Produced by: William Fox
- Starring: Shirley Mason
- Cinematography: Friend F. Baker
- Distributed by: Fox Film Corporation
- Release date: September 12, 1920
- Running time: 50 minutes
- Country: USA
- Language: Silent...English titles

Merely Mary Ann is a lost 1920 silent comedy-drama film directed by Edward J. Le Saint and starring Shirley Mason, based on the play Merely Mary Ann by Israel Zangwill. It was produced and distributed by Fox Film Corporation.

== Cast ==
- Shirley Mason - Mary Ann
- Casson Ferguson - Lancelot
- Harry Spingler - Peter
- Georgia Woodthorpe - Mrs. Leadbatter
- Babe London - Rosie Leadbatter
- Kewpie Morgan - Drunkard
- Jean Hersholt - Stranger
- Paul Weigel - Vicar

== See also ==
- 1937 Fox vault fire
- Merely Mary Ann(1916)
- Merely Mary Ann(1931)
