= Little Miss Happiness =

1916 film by John G. Adolfi

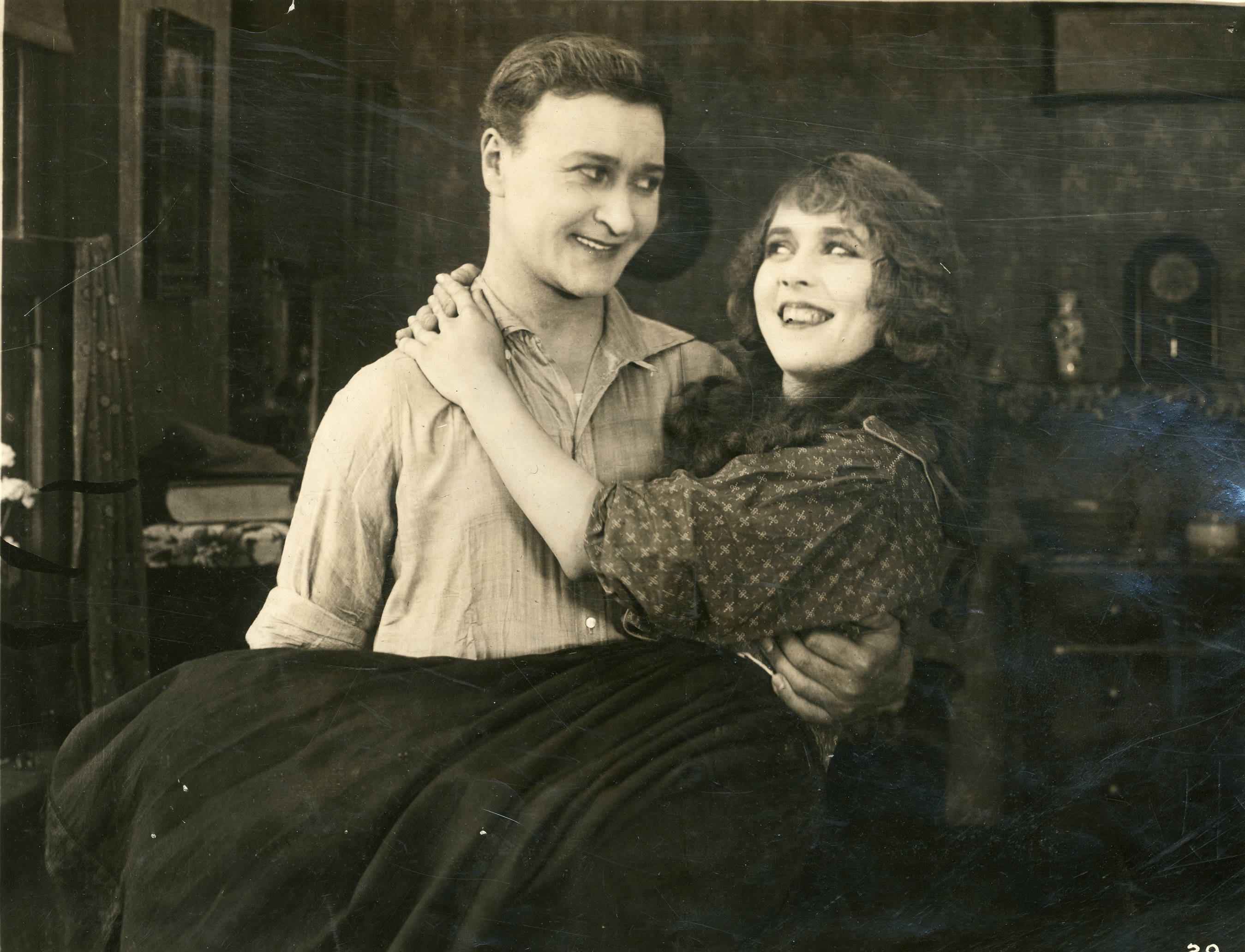
- Still with June Caprice and Harry Hilliard
- Directed by: John G. Adolfi
- Screenplay by: Clarence J. Harris
- Story by: Clarence J. Harris
- Starring: June Caprice; Harry Hilliard; Zena Keefe; Sara Alexander; Sidney Bracey; Leo A. Kennedy
- Cinematography: Hugh McClung
- Production company: Fox Film Corporation
- Distributed by: Fox Film Corporation
- Release date: August 21, 1916
- Running time: 5 reels
- Country: United States
- Language: Silent (English intertitles)

Little Miss Happiness is a 1916 American silent drama film directed by John G. Adolfi and starring June Caprice, Harry Hilliard, Zena Keefe, Sara Alexander, Sidney Bracey, and Leo A. Kennedy. The film was released by Fox Film Corporation on August 21, 1916.

== Cast ==
- June Caprice as Lucy White
- Harry Hilliard as Dave Allen
- Zena Keefe as Sadie Allen
- Sara Alexander as Grandma White
- Sidney Bracey as Jim Butterfield
- Leo A. Kennedy as Max Barker
- Robert Vivian as Squire Allen
- Lucia Moore as Nancy Allen
- Genevieve Reynolds as Mrs. Butterfield
- Grace Beaumont as Maudie Butterfield
- Edward Hoyt as The Minister

== Preservation ==
With no copies of Little Miss Happiness located in any film archives, it is a lost film.

== See also ==
- List of lost films
- 1937 Fox vault fire
