= Lamar Johnstone =

American actor and director (1884–1919)

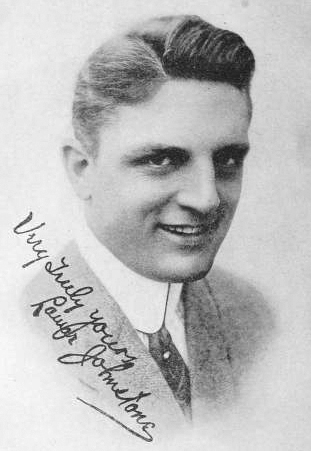
- Johnstone in 1915
- Born: Edward Lamar Johnstone; March 15, 1884; Fairfax, Virginia, U.S.
- Died: May 19, 1919 (aged 35); Palm Springs, California, U.S.
- Other name: Lamar Johnson or Lamar Johnston
- Occupation: Actor
- Years active: 1911–1919

Edward Lamar Johnstone (March 15, 1884 – May 21, 1919) was an American silent film actor and director.

== Biography ==
Johnstone (left) with Dorothy Gibson in the 1912 comedy The Lucky Hold Up now housed in the Library of Congress, the only one of their films to survive

Born in Fairfax, Virginia, Johnstone starred in 82 films as an actor between 1911 and his death in 1919. He often starred alongside Dorothy Gibson, an actress who survived the sinking of the Titanic.

Johnstone directed three films; one in 1913 called Truth in the Wilderness, starring Charlotte Burton, The Turning Point (1914), and The Unforgiven (1915). In the 1916 serial Secret of the Submarine, Johnstone got to fly Juanita Hansen in a Curtiss Model D pusher biplane.

== Death ==
Johnstone died on May 21, 1919, in Palm Springs, California, his cause of death was heart attack.

== Filmography ==
=== As actor ===
Year	Title	Role	Notes
1912	Robin Hood	Guy of Gisbourne	Short
1913	The Lady Killer	Adolph - the Lady Killer	Short
1913	Sapho		Short, uncredited, lost film
1913	Through a Telescope		Short
1916	Ben Blair	Scott Winthrop	
1916	The Secret of the Submarine	Gerald Morton	Lost film
1916	The Tongues of Men	Dr. Lyn Fanshawe (as Lamar Johnson)	Lost film
1918	That Devil, Bateese	Martin Stuart	Lost film
1918	The Girl of My Dreams	Kenneth Stewart (as Lamar Johnston)	Lost film
1919	Diane of the Green Van	Carl Granberry	Lost film
1919	The Sheriff's Son	Brad Charlton	release posthumously
1919	The Spite Bride	Arthur Derford (as Lamar Johnston)	release posthumously
1919	Wolves of the Night	Burton Mortimer (as Lamar Johnson)	release posthumously
1919	The Lone Star Ranger	Jeff Lawson	Lost film, release posthumously

=== As director ===
Year	Title	Notes
1913	Truth in the Wilderness	
1914	The Turning Point	
1915	The Unforgiven	
