= Florence Crawford =

American actress

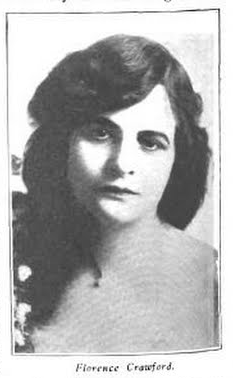
Motography, 1915

Florence Crawford was an American silent film actress.

Crawford was born in Franklin, Crawford County, Pennsylvania, and educated in Pittsburgh and New York. She worked for William Fox, Universal, and Mutual Film Corporation.

== Filmography ==
- The Scarlet West (1925) .... Mrs. Harper
- The Path of Happiness (1916) .... Doris Ingraham
- The Man Inside (1916) .... Yvette Deplau
- Driven by Fate (1915)
- Copper (1915)
- Buried Treasure (1915)
- The Job and the Jewels (1915)
- The Little Mother (1915/II)
- Her Buried Past (1915) .... Mrs. Madison
- Your Baby and Mine (1915)
- The Deputy's Chance That Won (1915)
- The Beast Within (1915) .... Mamie Rose
- The Express Messenger (1915)
- After Twenty Years (1915)
- The Terror of the Mountains (1915)
- A Lucky Disappointment (1914)
- Bill and Ethel at the Ball(1914)
- The Forest Thieves (1914)
- They Never Knew (1914)
- The Hidden Message (1914)
- The Miner's Peril (1914)
- Out of the Deputy's Hands (1914)
- Bad Man Mason (1914)
- The Tardy Cannon Ball (1914)
- Where the Mountains Meet (1914)
- The High Grader (1914)
- The Miner's Baby (1914)
- The Stolen Oar (1914)
- The Sheriff's Prisoner (1914)
- How Bill Squared It for His Boss (1914) (as Miss Crawford)
- A Pair of Cuffs (1914)
- His Punishment (1914/I)
- It's a Bear! (1914)
- The Thief and the Book (1914)
- Sorority Initiation (1914)
- The Lady Killer (1913)
