= Little Mother =

Little Mother may refer to:

- The Little Mother, a 1911 American silent short drama film
- Little Mother (1929 film), an Our Gang short silent comedy film
- Little Mother (1935 film), an Austrian-Hungarian comedy film
- Little Mother (1973 film), a drama, romance, cult film
