= The Scarlet West =

1925 film

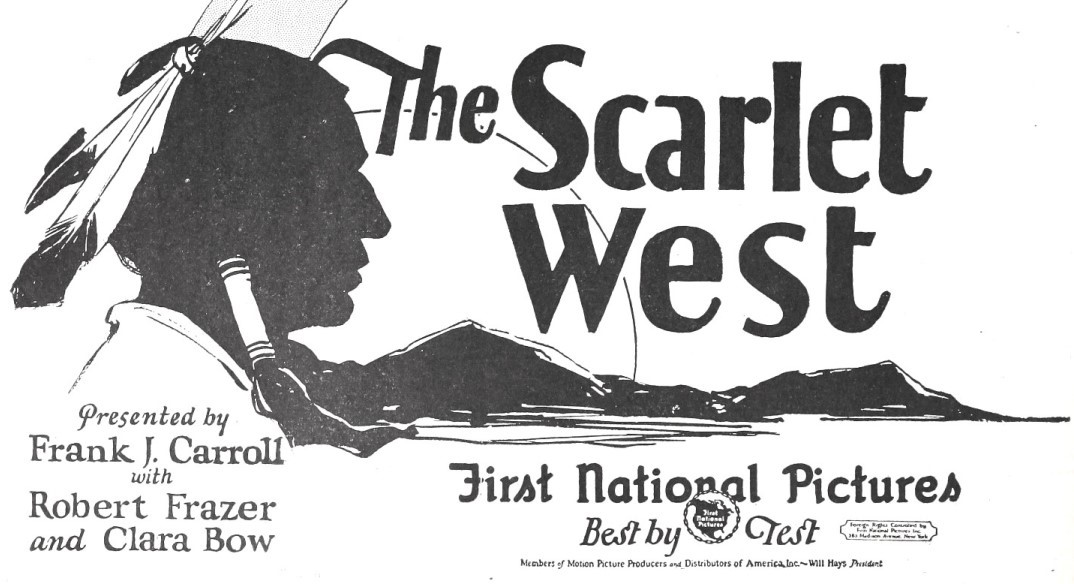
- Advertisement
- Directed by: John G. Adolfi
- Written by: Anthony Paul Kelly
- Based on: "The Scarlet West" by A. B. Heath
- Produced by: Frank J. Carroll
- Starring: Robert Frazer; Clara Bow
- Cinematography: George Benoit; Benjamin Kline; Victor Shuler; F. L. Hoefler
- Distributed by: First National Pictures
- Release date: June 26, 1925
- Running time: 9 reels
- Country: United States
- Language: Silent (English intertitles)

The Scarlet West is a 1925 American silent historical drama film directed by John G. Adolfi and starring Robert Frazer and Clara Bow. It was distributed by the First National company.

This was an ambitious silent film made by an independent producer about George Armstrong Custer and the Battle of the Little Bighorn. It was filmed on location at Dolores, Colorado.

== Cast ==
- Robert Frazer as Cardelanche
- Clara Bow as Miriam
- Robert Edeson as General Kinnard
- Johnnie Walker as Lt. Parkman
- Walter McGrail as Lt. Harper
- Gaston Glass as Capt. Howard
- Helen Ferguson as Nestina
- Ruth Stonehouse as Mrs. Custer
- Martha Francis as Harriett Kinnard
- Florence Crawford as Mrs. Harper
- Jacqueline Frazer as Child
- Maude Bash Haefler as Wife
- Jack House as Indian Scout
- Frank W. Pyle as Scout

== Preservation ==
There are no prints of The Scarlet West surviving, which makes it a lost film. A trailer survives at the Library of Congress. Some of the still photography from the production survives and is used in a documentary on local cinematographer Victor Shuler, who was one of four cameramen on the production.

== See also ==
- General Custer at the Little Big Horn (1926)
- They Died with Their Boots On (1941)
- Little Big Man (1970)
