= The Sheriff's Son =

1919 film directed by Victor Schertzinger

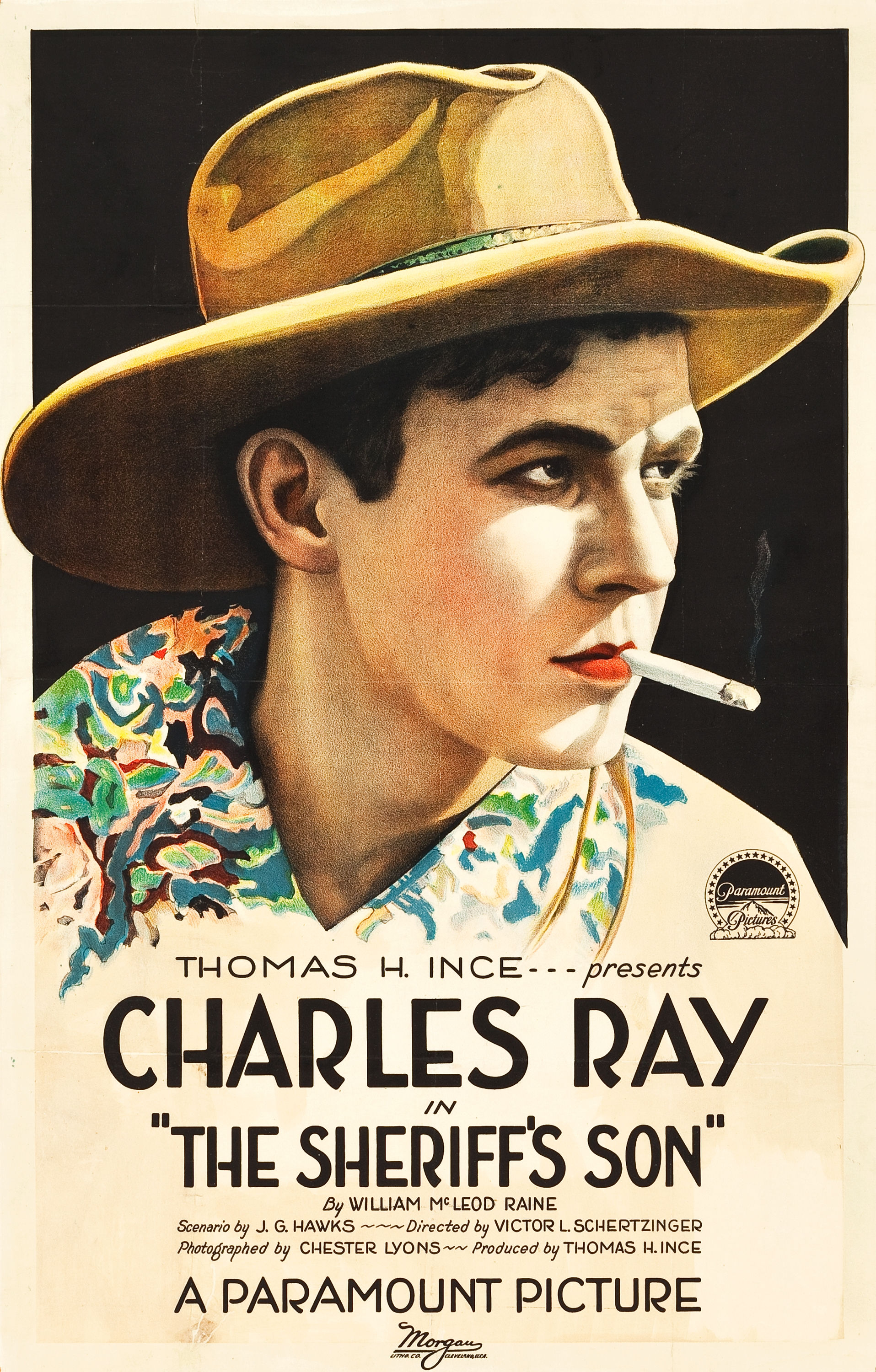
- Poster
- Directed by: Victor Schertzinger
- Screenplay by: J.G. Hawks; William MacLeod Raine
- Produced by: Thomas H. Ince
- Starring: Charles Ray; Seena Owen; J. P. Lockney; Charles K. French; Otto Hoffman; Lamar Johnstone
- Cinematography: Chester Lyons
- Production company: Famous Players–Lasky Corporation
- Distributed by: Paramount Pictures
- Release date: March 30, 1919
- Running time: 50 minutes
- Country: United States
- Languages: Silent; English intertitles

The Sheriff's Son is a 1919 American silent Western film directed by Victor Schertzinger and written by J.G. Hawks and William MacLeod Raine. The film stars Charles Ray, Seena Owen, J. P. Lockney, Charles K. French, Otto Hoffman, and Lamar Johnstone. The film was released on March 30, 1919, by Paramount Pictures. It is not known whether the film currently survives, and it may be a lost film.

== Plot ==
As described in a film magazine, Royal Beaudry returns from college to a small western town and opens up a law office. His father, a famous sheriff, had been murdered twenty previously by the Rutherford gang, who still own a range and terrify the county. Following a robbery and the recovery of the money by Dave Dingwell, Dave is captured and held prisoner on the Rutherford range, tortured by the gang in hope of regaining the money, which he has hidden. Beaudry overcomes his fear and goes to the Rutherford place in attempt to determine Dave's whereabouts. The Rutherford gang learns his identity and Beaudry is wounded in a battle with the gang. Beulah Rutherford falls in love with him. Dave is rescued. Later, in town, Beaudry meets the bully of the gang and bests him in a street brawl. Beulah and Beaudry continue their courtship while members of the Rutherford gang decide to reform and become respectable citizens.

== Cast ==
- Charles Ray as Royal Beaudry
- Seena Owen as Beulah Rutherford
- J. P. Lockney as Dave Dingwell
- Charles K. French as Hal Rutherford
- Otto Hoffman as Jess Tighe
- Lamar Johnstone as Brad Charlton
- Clyde Benson as Dan Meldrum
- Buck Jones as Cowboy
