= Caprice of the Mountains =

1916 film by John G. Adolfi

- Directed by: John G. Adolfi
- Written by: Clarence J. Harris (scenario)
- Starring: June Caprice; Harry Hilliard; Joel Day; Lisle Leigh; Richard Hale
- Cinematography: Hugh McClung
- Production company: Fox Film Corporation
- Distributed by: Fox Film Corporation
- Release date: July 9, 1916
- Running time: 5 reels
- Country: United States
- Language: English

Caprice of the Mountains is a 1916 American silent drama film directed by John G. Adolfi, and starring June Caprice, Harry Hilliard, Joel Day, Lisle Leigh, and Richard Hale. The film was released by Fox Film Corporation on July 9, 1916.

== Plot summary ==
Wealthy playboy Jack Edmunds spends some time in a small mountain town, where he makes the acquaintance of local girl Caprice Talbert and invites her to his apartment. When Caprice's father finds out about it — although nothing happened — he forces the two to marry, and the newlyweds move to Jack's home in the city. Tensions arise between the two as Jack is still resentful over the "shotgun wedding" and Caprice finds that she can't bear living in the big city and wants to return home.

== Cast ==
- June Caprice as Caprice Talbert
- Harry Hilliard as Jack Edmunds
- Joel Day as Dave Talbert
- Lisle Leigh as Maria Baker
- Richard Hale as Tim Baker
- Albert Gran as James Edmunds
- Tom Burrough as Tom Edmunds
- Robert D. Walker as Dick Deane
- Sara Alexander as Caprice's aunt
- Harriet Thompson as Fairy queen
- Grace Beaumont
- Sidney Bracey
- Zena Keefe
- Leo A. Kennedy
- Lucia Moore
- Genevieve Reynolds
- Robert Vivian

== Preservation ==
The film is now considered lost.

== See also ==
- 1937 Fox vault fire
- List of lost films
