= Merely Mary Ann (1916 film) =

1916 silent film

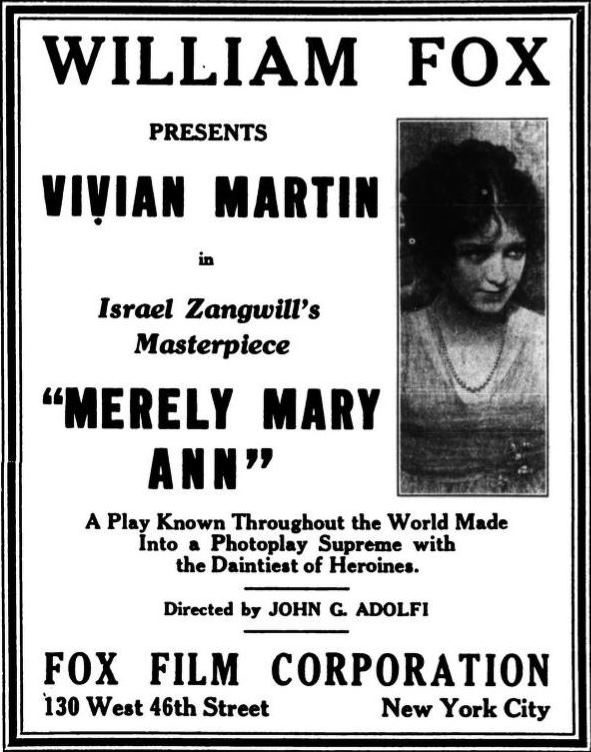
- Directed by: John G. Adolfi
- Written by: John G. Adolfi; John W. Kellette
- Based on: Merely Mary Ann by Israel Zangwill
- Produced by: William Fox
- Starring: Vivian Martin; Harry Hilliard
- Cinematography: Hugh McClung
- Distributed by: Fox Film Corporation
- Release date: February 6, 1916
- Running time: 5 reels
- Country: USA
- Language: Silent...English intertitles

Merely Mary Ann is a lost 1916 silent comedy-drama film directed by John G. Adolfi and starring Vivian Martin and Harry Hilliard. It is based on the 1903 Broadway play by Israel Zangwill. It was produced and released by the Fox Film Corporation.

== Cast ==
- Vivian Martin - Mary Ann
- Edward Hoyt - Reverend Smudge
- Harry Hilliard -
- Laura Lyman -
- Isabel O'Madigan -
- Sidney Bracey -
- Niles Welch -

== See also ==
- 1937 Fox vault fire
- List of Fox Film films
