= Joel Day =

American actor and artist

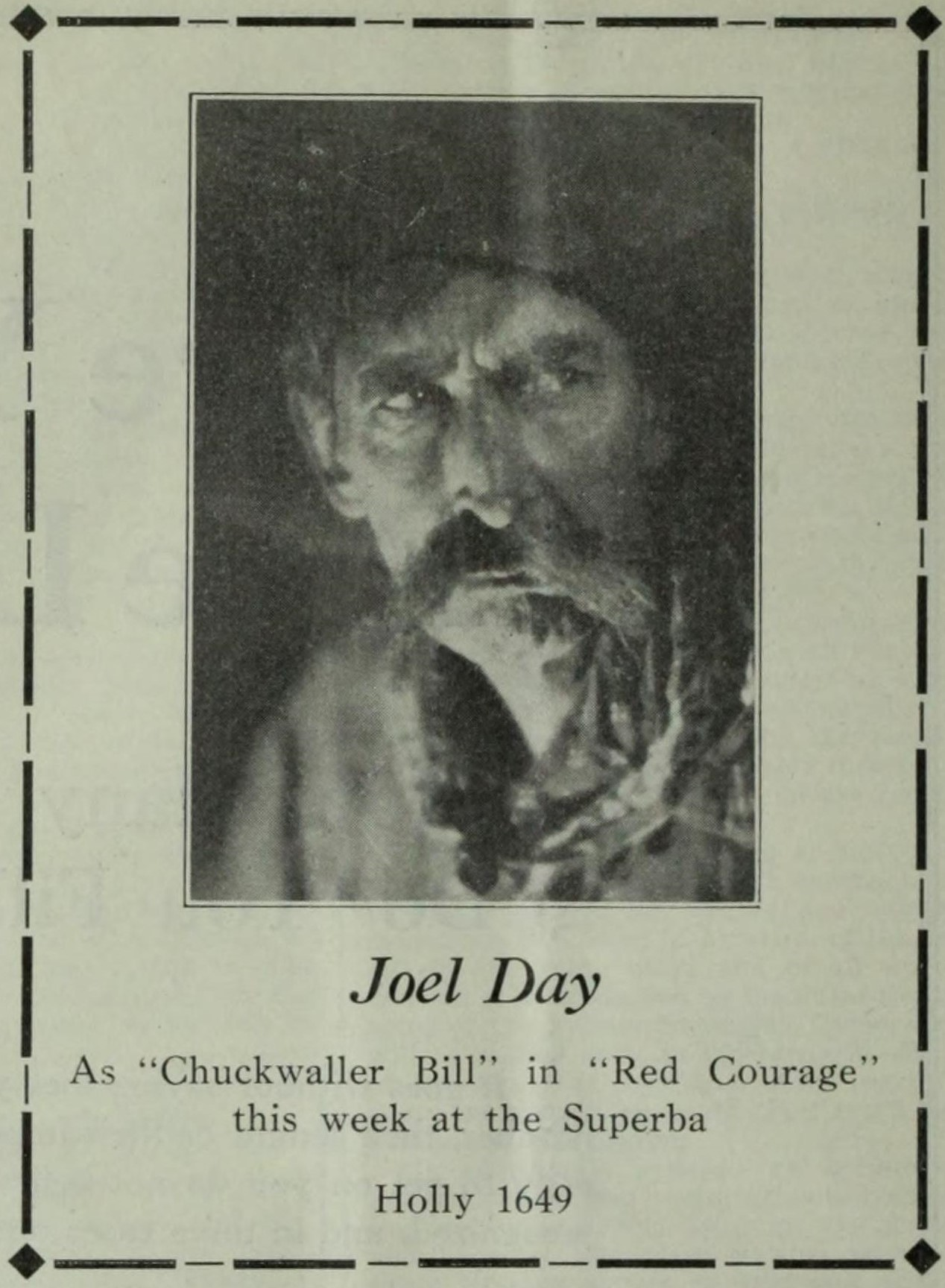
Joel Day in Red Courage.

Joel Day was an American actor and artist who worked during the silent film era.

== Life and career ==
Joel Arthur Day was born on 16 March 1861 in Hillsboro, Montgomery, Illinois. He grew up in Salina, Kansas.

Day was married to Elizabeth Mets on 28 December 1892, in Somerville, Somerset County, New Jersey.

In 1900 Day was living in New Jersey and working as an artist. In 1910 Day listed his occupation as a designer for a magazine in the 1910 US Census. He also acted in stock theater, eventually moving into silent film, and continued to paint between film contracts.

Day died in California on 23 November 1923.

== Partial filmography ==
- The Egyptian Mummy (1914) as Tim, the Egyptian Mummy
- The Man of Shame (1915) as Death
- Caprice of the Mountains (1916) as Dave Talbert
- The Pride of the Clan (1917) as The Dominie
- Vengeance (1918) as Selim
- The Challenge Accepted (1918) as Tom Carey
- Hit or Miss (1919) as Si Martin
- Red Courage (1921) as Chuckwalla Bill
- Watch your Step (1922) as Ky Wilson
- The Face Between (1922) as Mr Canfield
- In the Days of Buffalo Bill (1922) as Abraham Lincoln
