= Red Courage =

1921 film

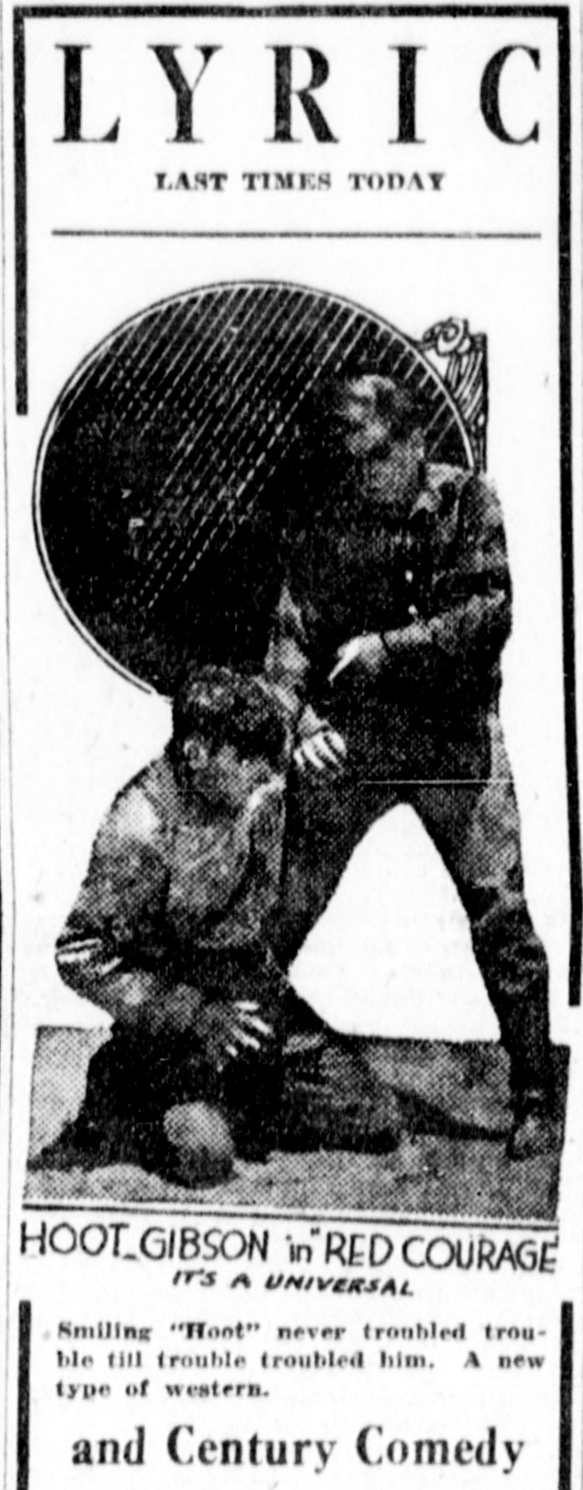
- Newspaper advertisement
- Directed by: B. Reeves Eason
- Written by: Harvey Gates
- Based on: "The Sheriff of Cinnabar" by Peter B. Kyne
- Starring: Hoot Gibson
- Cinematography: Virgil Miller
- Distributed by: Universal Film Manufacturing Company
- Release date: October 10, 1921
- Running time: 50 minutes
- Country: United States
- Languages: Silent; English intertitles

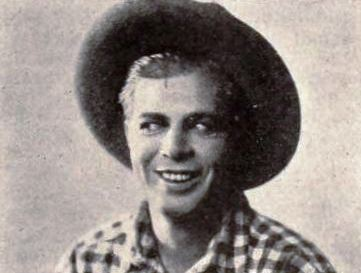
Hoot Gibson in Red Courage

Red Courage is a lost 1921 American silent Western film directed by B. Reeves Eason and featuring Hoot Gibson.

== Plot ==
As described in a film magazine, Pinto Peters and his pal Chuckwalla Bill ride into town just as the editor of the local newspaper is being urged to leave by a gang of thugs led by Joe Reedly. The pair give the editor $100 and get a bill of sale for the newspaper, only to find out later that Reedly holds a mortgage of $200 against it. This they pay off and start a campaign to clean up the town. They meet with considerable opposition until they enlist the services of Judge Fay. When Pinto runs for sheriff and defeats the tool of Reedly, everything is smooth sailing. The crooks are run out of town, money that was about to be stolen is restored to Jane (Malone), the ward of Reedly, and Pinto after several hard fights wins her hand.

== Cast ==
- Hoot Gibson as Pinto Peters
- Joel Day as Chuckwalla Bill
- Molly Malone as Jane Reedly
- Joseph W. Girard as Joe Reedly (credited as Joe Girard)
- Merrill McCormick as Percy Gibbons (credited as William Merrill McCormick)
- Charles Newton as Tom Caldwell
- Arthur Hoyt as Nathan Hitch
- Joe Harris as Blackie Holloway
- Richard Cummings as Judge Fay (credited as Dick Cummings)
- Mary Philbin as Eliza Fay
- Jim Corey as Steve Carrol
- Mack V. Wright as Sam Waters (credited as Mac V. Wright)

== See also ==
- Hoot Gibson filmography
