= The Lottery Man =

The Lottery Man is a comic play in three acts by Rida Johnson Young. Produced by the Shubert family, it premiered on Broadway at the Bijou Theatre on December 6, 1909, and was later adapted into a film twice; once in 1916 and again in 1919. It was Young's first critically and financially successful play as a playwright.

The original Broadway cast included Janet Beecher as Helen Heyer, Cyril Scott as Jack Wright, Louise Galloway as Mrs. Wright, Helen Lowell as Lizzie Roberts, Robert MacKay as "Foxey" Peyton, Ethel Winthrop as Mrs. Peyton, Harry S. Hadfield as Stevens, Mary Leslie Mayo as Hedwig Jensen, and Wallace Sharpe as Hamilton. A production of the play, again produced by the Shubert family, toured nationally in 1910 starring Sadie Harris as Helen Heyer, William Roselle as Jack Wright, Lucia Moore as Mrs. Wright, Vivian Ogden as Lizzie Roberts, Florence Robertson as Mrs. Peyton, and May Donahue as Hedwig Jensen.

== Summary ==
Jack Wright, a handsome, well-travelled young newspaperman with a gambling problem and debts, has been fired by his employer over losses that he caused to the paper with some shoddy reporting. To turn in a sensational story that will get his job back, and also raise some cash, he decides to conduct a lottery through the newspaper with himself as the prize in marriage; he will also supply the paper with weekly tales of his adventurous exploits, and each installment will tantalize readers a hint about his identity. He promises the paper that if he fails to go through with the marriage, the winner will get all the lottery money. As soon as the piece goes to press, he falls in love with a charming girl, Helen, and realizes that the lottery will ruin his new relationship. The lottery is a big hit, raising $300,000. In an attempt to prevent matrimonial disaster, he buys up all the lottery tickets he can. When Helen learns of the stunt, she is upset and breaks up with Jack. On the last day of the lottery, a nervous spinster, Lizzie, wins the lottery and refuses to give up her prize. It turns out, however, that she has stolen the lottery ticket. All ends well, and Jack marries Helen.
