= The Egyptian Mummy =

1914 film by Lee Beggs

The Egyptian Mummy is a 1914 American silent short comedy film produced and directed by Lee Beggs. This one reel film was released by Vitagraph Studios on the 16th December 1914.

== Cast ==
- Lee Beggs as Professor Hicks
- Billy Quirk as Dick Graham
- Constance Talmadge as Florence Hicks
- Joel Day as Tim - The Egyptian Mummy
- Nellie Anderson as The Landlady
