= The Lady Killer (1913 film) =

- Starring: William Garwood; Victory Bateman; Florence Crawford
- Distributed by: Mutual Film
- Release date: August 24, 1913
- Country: United States
- Languages: Silent film English intertitles

The Lady Killer is a 1913 American silent short comedy film starring William Garwood, Victory Bateman, Florence Crawford, Howard Davies, Lamar Johnstone, and Anne Drew.

== Cast ==
- William Garwood
- Anne Drew
- Lamar Johnstone as Adolph - the Lady Killer
- Victory Bateman
- Mr. Cornell
- Florence Crawford
- Howard Davies
- Mr. Muth
- Fred Warren
