= The Ragged Princess =

1916 film by John G. Adolfi

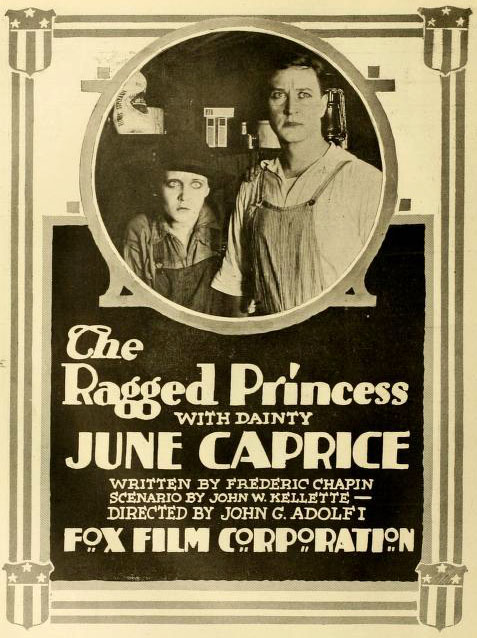
- Advertisement
- Directed by: John G. Adolfi
- Written by: Frederick Chapin; John W. Kellette
- Starring: June Caprice; Harry Hilliard; Richard Neill
- Cinematography: Rial Schellinger
- Production company: Fox Film
- Distributed by: Fox Film
- Release date: October 16, 1916
- Running time: 5 reels
- Country: United States
- Languages: Silent; English intertitles

The Ragged Princess is a 1916 American silent comedy drama film directed by John G. Adolfi and starring June Caprice, Harry Hilliard, and Richard Neill.

== Cast ==
- June Caprice as Alicia Jones
- Harry Hilliard as Harry Deigan
- Richard Neill as Thomas Deigan
- Tom Burrough as Dr. Halpern
- Florence Ashbrooke as Mrs. Langford
- Sidney Bracey as Toby Rice
- Caroline Harris as Housekeeper
- Jane Lee as Little Jane
- Katherine Lee as Little Katherine

== Bibliography ==
- Solomon, Aubrey. The Fox Film Corporation, 1915-1935: A History and Filmography. McFarland, 2011.
