= Edna Munsey =

American stage actress (1891–1951)

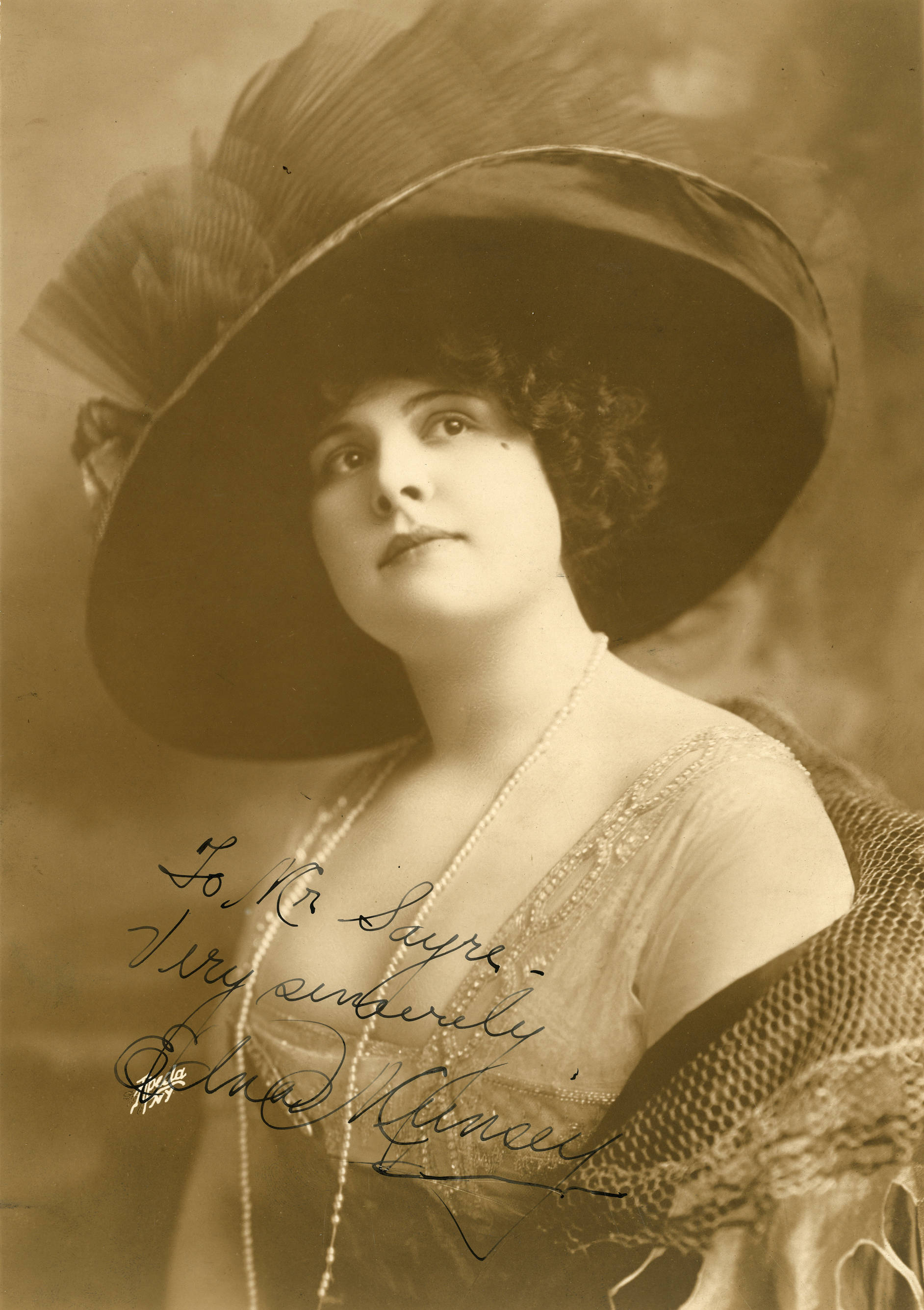
- Born: June 8, 1891; Duluth, Minnesota
- Died: August 11, 1951 (aged 60); New York, New York
- Occupation: Actress
- Years active: 1910s
- Spouse: Thomas J. Dillon (m. 1928)

Edna Munsey Dillon (June 8, 1891 – August 11, 1951) was an American stage actress.

== Early life ==
Edna Munsey was from Duluth, Minnesota, the daughter of English-born parents. She trained as a pianist, and graduated from the National Park Seminary in Washington, D.C.

== Career ==
Munsey was an actress and singer in several musicals and comedies, including The Gingerbread Man (1915), The Little Cafe (1915), The Only Girl (1915–1916) by Victor Herbert, and Rock-a-Bye Baby (1918) with music by Jerome Kern. She was also seen on the vaudeville stage in the United States and Canada. She appeared in one silent film, Patsy (1917), starring June Caprice. Of her soprano singing voice, a Chicago critic hailed her sweet tone but criticized her enunciation: "You can't tell whether Edna is singing in French, Latin or Greek," he complained, adding "but who cared, not on a sweltering, accursed day like yesterday, anyhow."

She traveled with her mother as her chaperone and companion during her career. "It is strange what erroneous ideas most people have of the life of a girl who is really in earnest on the stage," she commented in a 1915 interview, in which she described a life of discipline and sacrifice for her career.

She married Thomas Dillon, a steel company executive. She died in 1951 in New York.
