= The Pride of the Clan =

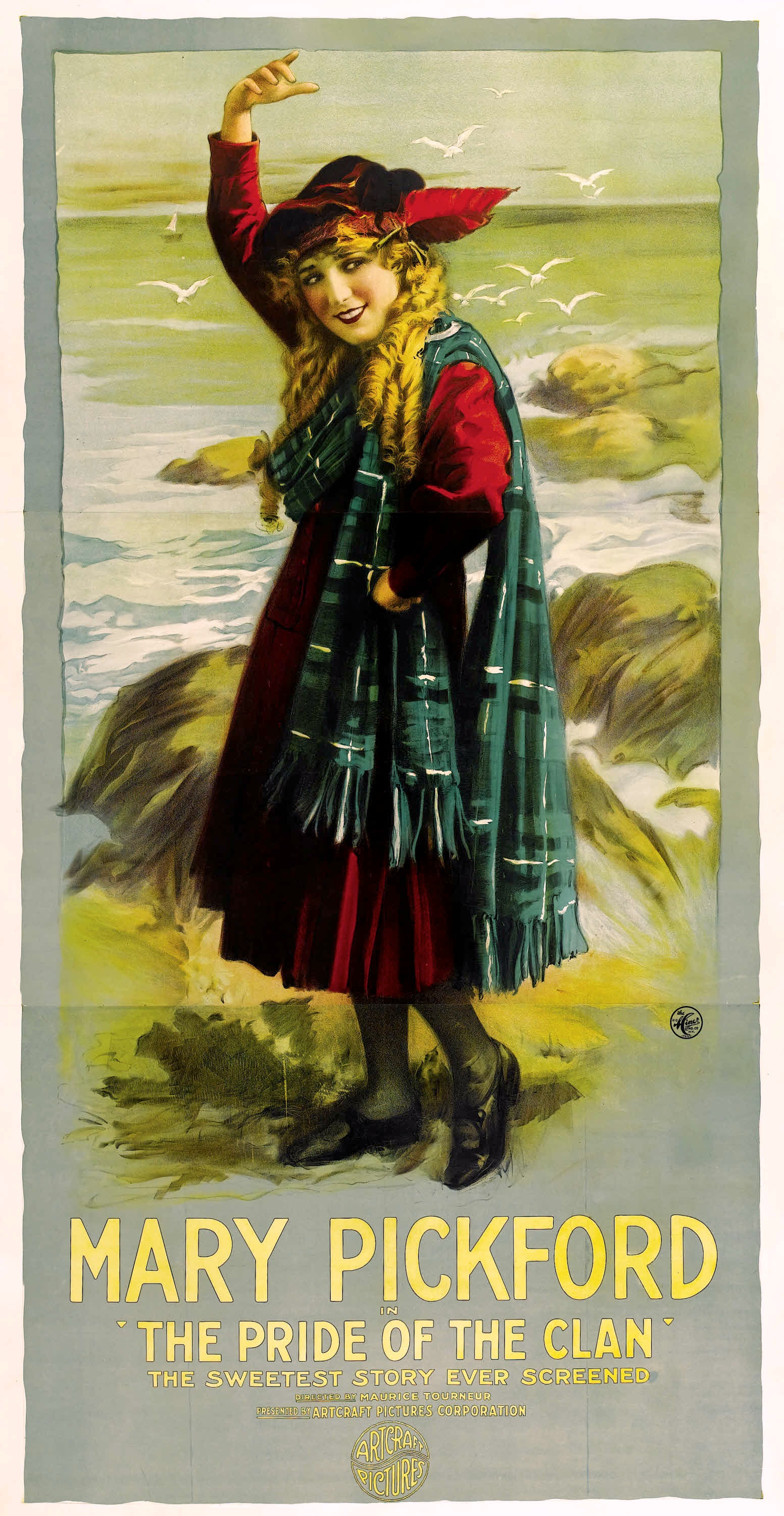
- Theatrical release three-sheet poster
- Directed by: Maurice Tourneur
- Written by: Elaine Sterne Carrington; Charles E. Whittaker
- Produced by: Mary Pickford
- Starring: Mary Pickford; Matt Moore
- Cinematography: John van den Broek; Lucien Andriot
- Distributed by: Artcraft Pictures Corporation
- Release date: January 7, 1917
- Running time: 84 minutes
- Country: United States
- Language: Silent (English intertitles)

Set photos during production Marblehead, Mass

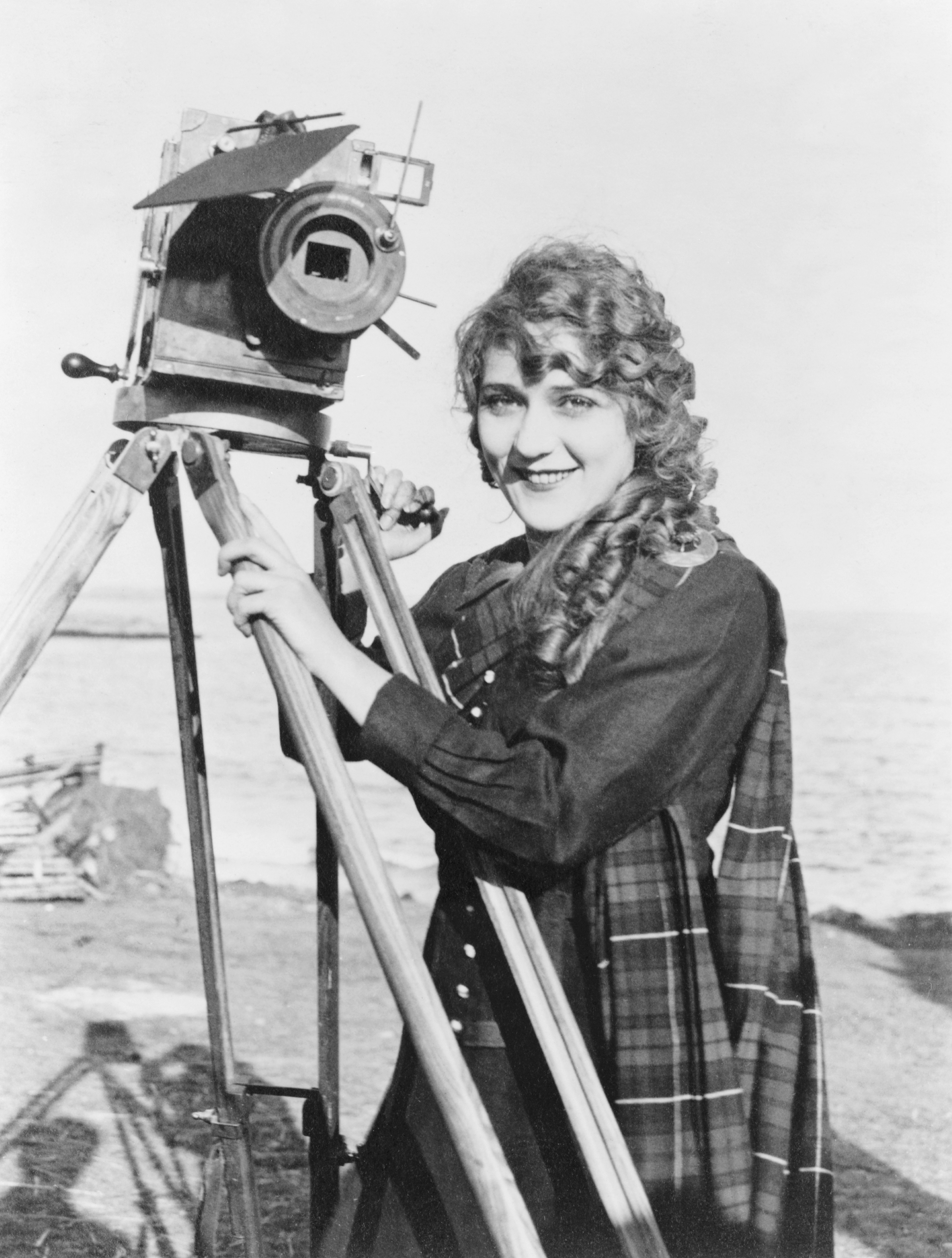
Mary Pickford on set in Marblehead, Mass

The Pride of the Clan

The Pride of the Clan is a 1917 American silent romantic drama film directed by Maurice Tourneur, and starring Mary Pickford and Matt Moore.

== Plot ==
After her father, the chieftain of a clan off the western coast of Scotland, dies at sea during a storm, Marget MacTavish consoles the other Clan MacTavish members even though she is heartbroken. On the Sabbath, Marget takes command as chieftain and drives everyone into the nearly empty church, except for David Pitcairn, who thinks that praying is fruitless. When Marget and Jamie Campbell, a young fisherman, become engaged in a traditional ceremony, Mrs. Campbell writes to the Countess of Dunstable and confesses that years earlier, she, as Jamie's nurse, reported Jamie's death so that she could raise him. The countess arrives with her second husband, an Earl, who convinces Marget that for Jamie's sake she should break the engagement. Although Jamie protests, Marget uses her authority as chieftain to command him to leave her. Marget drifts to sea to leave the area, but her old, unseaworthy vessel begins to sink. Pitcairn awakens and rings an alarm, then prays for Marget as Jamie takes a power boat from his mother's yacht and rescues her. Jamie's parents then accept the marriage.

== Cast ==
- Mary Pickford as Marget MacTavish
- Matt Moore as Jamie Campbell
- Warren Cook as Robert, Earl of Dunstable
- Kathryn Browne-Decker as The Countess of Dunstable (credited as Kathryn Browne Decker)
- Ed Roseman as David Pitcairn
- Joel Day as The Dominie
- Leatrice Joy - uncredited

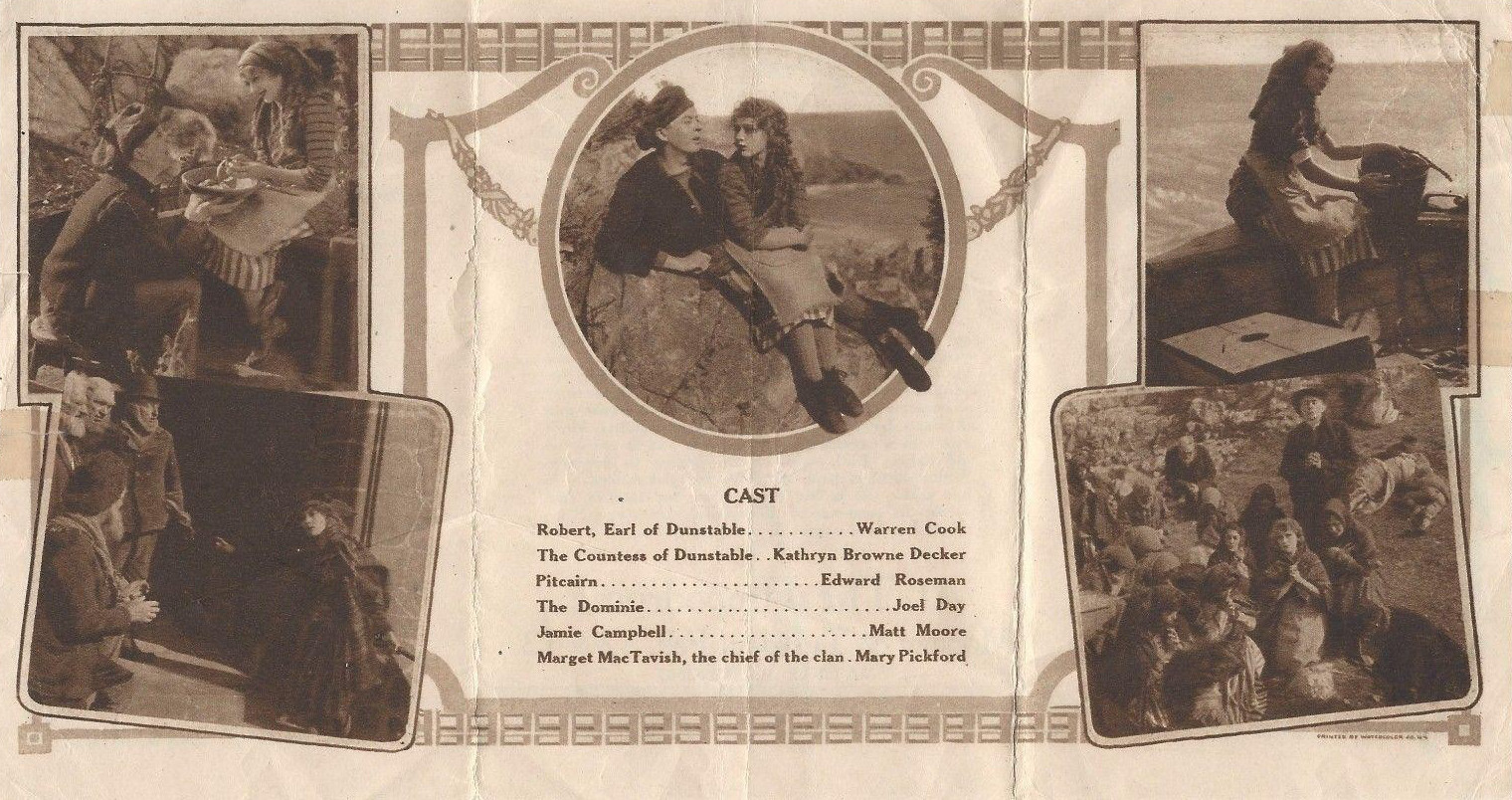
Cast Billing

== Production ==
The film was shot in Marblehead, Massachusetts and Fort Lee, New Jersey where many early film studios in America's first motion picture industry were based there at the beginning of the 20th century.
