= The Face Between =

1922 film directed by Bayard Veiller

- Directed by: Bayard Veiller
- Written by: Lenore Coffee
- Based on: the short story, "The Carterets" by: Justus Miles Forman
- Starring: Bert Lytell; Andrée Tourneur; Sylvia Breamer
- Cinematography: Arthur Martinelli
- Production company: Metro Pictures
- Release date: April 17, 1922 (US)
- Running time: 5 reels
- Country: United States
- Language: English

The Face Between is a 1922 American silent melodrama film directed by Bayard Veiller, the film stars Bert Lytell, Andrée Tourneur, and Sylvia Breamer. It was released on April 17, 1922.

== Plot ==
Tom Carteret Jr. bears a striking resemblance to his father, Tom Sr. So much so that when his father is caught having an affair he decides to take the blame on himself, to spare his father. This despite the fact that just the night prior he had become engaged to his sweetheart, Sybil Eliot. Hartwell, the aggrieved husband, demands that Tom leave and go leave in a remote mountain cabin, staying there until Hartwell dies. Tom agrees, to save his family's honor. His fiancé is filled with horror at this turn of events and will not speak to him.

Once in the cabin, he meets Marianna Canfield, the daughter of the woman who does his laundry. Joe Borral is a local who is interested in Marianna. All the locals resent Tom's presence, and make life difficult for him. When Joe decides to physically attack Tom to convince him to leave, Marianna learns of the plan and rushes to the cabin to warn Tom. However, when she is discovered with Tom in his cabin, the local men are ready to tar and feather Tom. To save his life, she tells her father that she and Tom were going to elope. Just as they are about to leave for the minister, a telegram arrives, in which Tom learns that Hartwell has died, and that his family's name has been cleared. He also learns that Sybil has forgiven him.

But to save Marianna, he leaves with her to the minister's house. On the way there they are intercepted by Joe, who shoots them both. Before he slips into unconsciousness, Marianna, who has received a fatal wound, says that she will never leave him. He is discovered in a state of delirium several days later, and his taken back to his home, where he is nursed by Sybil. But every time he awakes, he sees the specter of Marianna superimposed over Sybil's visage. One night he sees Marianna's specter and attempts to follow her, but falls over a balcony to the floor a story below. When he wakes up, he learns that the visions and his fall were all part of the delirium, and that this is the first time he has awoken. He and Sybil are reconciled.

== Cast ==
- Bert Lytell as Tommy Carteret, Sr./Tommy Carteret, Jr.
- Andrée Tourneur as Sybil Eliot
- Sylvia Breamer as Marianna Canfield
- Hardee Kirkland as Mr. Hartwell
- Gerard Alexander as Mrs. Eliot
- Frank Brownlee as Joe Borral
- Burwell Hamrick as Jared
- Joel Day as Mr. Canfield
- De Witt Jennings as The doctor

== Reception ==
The Stockton Daily Evening Record gave the film a good review, "...it can be said that this unusual and highly exciting story provides all the ingredients of a perfect picture." They commended the performance of Lytell, and said his supporting cast was of "unusual excellence". The Arizona Republican also gave the movie a good review, calling it "an unusual story in dramatic value, and offers Lytell a role which, while taxing his skill to the utmost, proves he is the most versatile and accomplished of the male stars of the screen." The Bisbee Daily Review gave the film a very positive review stating it "is a picture which wins the support of those who believe in the movies as an institution with limitless possibilities for intelligent entertainment. In this picture, in which Bert Lytell, the Metro star, heads the unusually good cast, there is unfolded a story which has all the elements of universal popularity and which grows in interest and suspense with a logical development." On the other hand, the Los Angeles Times gave the film a poor review, "The only comment to make on such a thing is to express wonder that Bert Lytell should have starred in it, or that Metro should have produced it. 'The Face Between' cannot help the reputation of either very much." The Exhibitors Herald was ambivalent about the movie. On the one hand they said that "Lytell has had far more interesting vehicles than this...", but on the other hand they opined, "It is an entirely different story from what we are accustomed to seeing Lytell in and for those who like 'domestic tangles' it is one of the best." They gave particular applause to Martinelli's cinematography.
