= Through a Telescope =

1913 American silent comedy film

- Produced by: Eclair American Motion Picture Company
- Starring: Lamar Johnstone
- Distributed by: Universal Film Manufacturing Company
- Release date: July 20, 1913
- Country: United States
- Languages: Silent, English titles

Through a Telescope is a 1913 American silent comedy short film produced by the Eclair American Motion Picture Company and distributed through Universal Film Manufacturing Company. It starred Lamar Johnstone.

This film survives and is preserved in the Library of Congress.

== Cast ==
- Lamar Johnstone
- Eleanor Parker
