= Harry Hilliard (actor) =

American actor (1886–1966)

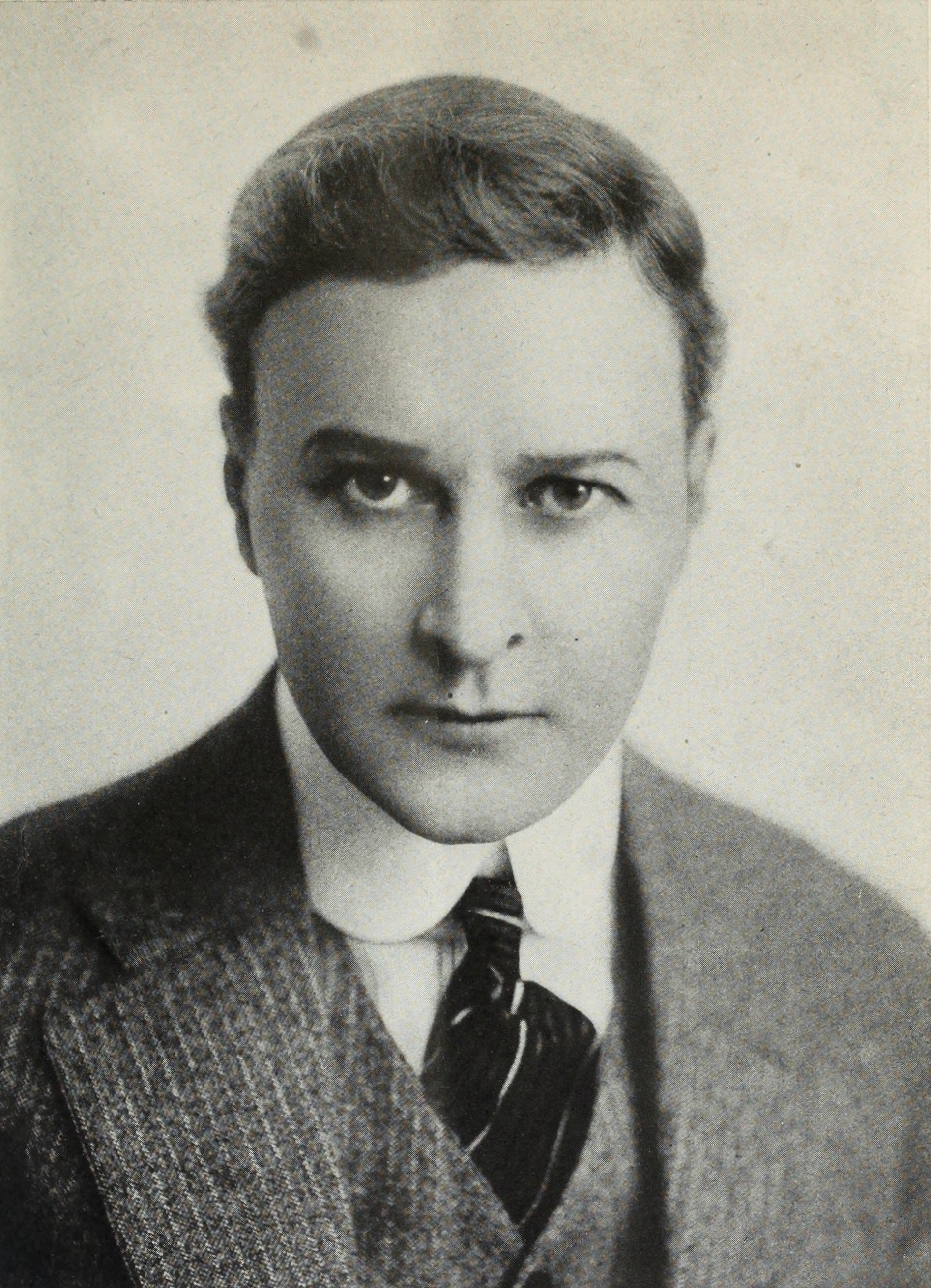
- Hilliard c. 1917
- Born: October 24, 1886; Cincinnati, Ohio, US
- Died: April 1966 (aged 79); St. Petersburg, Florida
- Occupation: actor
- Years active: 1916–1944

Harry S. Hilliard (1886–1966) was an American silent film actor best remembered as one of Theda Bara's leading men, if not her most prominent one. He started at Fox Films and continued on at Metro Pictures. Other leading ladies were June Caprice, May Allison, Carmel Myers and Gladys Brockwell. His career was essentially over by the end of the silent era but he had an uncredited role in a 1944 film. He is not the son of nor is he related to stage actor Robert C. Hilliard despite the resemblance.

Hilliard died in April 1966 after complications from a fall.

== Selected filmography ==
- Merely Mary Ann (1916)
- The Strength of the Weak (1916)
- Gold and the Woman (1916)
- The Little Fraud (1916 short)
- A Modern Thelma (1916)
- Caprice of the Mountains (1916)
- Little Miss Happiness (1916)
- The Ragged Princess (1916)
- Romeo and Juliet (1916)
- The New York Peacock (1917)
- Her Greatest Love (1917)
- Heart and Soul (1917)
- Patsy (1917)
- Every Girl's Dream (1917)
- A Successful Adventure (1918)
- Set Free (1918)
- The Little White Savage (1919)
- The Little Rowdy (1919)
- Destiny (1919)
- The Sneak (1919)
- Cheating Herself (1919)
- The Adventures of Mark Twain (1944) (uncredited)
