= Lucia Moore =

American actress (1867–1932)

Lucia Moore (December 10, 1867 – April 1, 1932) was an American stage and silent film actress. She appeared in plays on Broadway from 1900 through 1932; often in works written by women playwrights, such as Rachel Crothers, Anita Loos, Clare Kummer, Jean Webster, and Rida Johnson Young. She also appeared in original plays by Maxwell Anderson, Barry Conners, George Scarborough, and Edgar Selwyn.

== Life and career ==
Born in Shreveport, Louisiana, Moore made her Broadway debut as Paulina in Stanislaus Stange's Quo Vadis at the New York Theatre which opened in April 1900. Later that year she appeared as Alice Palmer in Theodore Kremer's The Slaves of the Orient at the Star Theatre. She did not return to Broadway again until 1910 when she starred as Mrs. Comstock in Maurice Campbell's Where There's a Will with the American Play Company at Weber's Music Hall. That same year she toured nationally as Mrs. Wright in Rida Johnson Young's The Lottery Man.

In 1911 Moore was engaged at the Theatre Royal, Nottingham where she starred opposite the British actress Winifred Delevanti in Arthur S. Gill's The Kiss of Isis. In 1913 she starred in George Scarborough's Broadway play The Lure, and reprised her role in the 1914 silent film of the same name. In 1914 she returned to Broadway in another play penned by Scarborough, What is love?, in the role of Mrs. Samuel Hoyt.

In 1919 Moore created the role of Mrs. Smith in the original Broadway production of Rachel Crothers's 39 East; a role she also performed in the 1920 silent film. She created roles in several more plays written by women on Broadway, including Mrs. Wolfe in Laura Hinkley and Mabel Ferris's Another Man's Shoes (1918), The Governor's Wife in Cora Dick Gantt's The Tavern (1920), Mary Vaughan in Clare Kummer's The Mountain Men (1921), and Mrs. Simmons in Anita Loos and John Emerson's The Whole Town's Talking (1923). She also portrayed Miss Pritchard in the 1918 Broadway revival of Jean Webster's Daddy-Long-Legs.

Moore's other film credits include Caprice of the Mountains (1916), Nancy Allen in Little Miss Happiness (1916), Lady Clifford in Her Double Life (1916), and the Mother in The Small Town Girl (1917). Her other roles in original plays on Broadway included Mrs. Springer in Edgar Selwyn's Anything Might Happen (1923), Mrs. Harrington in Barry Conners's The Patsy (1925), Mrs. Halevy in Maxwell Anderson's Saturday's Children (1927), Mrs. Weaver in J. C. and Elliott Nugent's Take My Advice (1927), Mrs. James Russell Lockhart Sr. in Barry Conners's Girl Trouble (1928), and Mrs. Farquhar in Don Mullally and H. A. Archibald's Coastwise (1931).

Moore died in New York City on April 1, 1932.
