= Patsy (1917 film) =

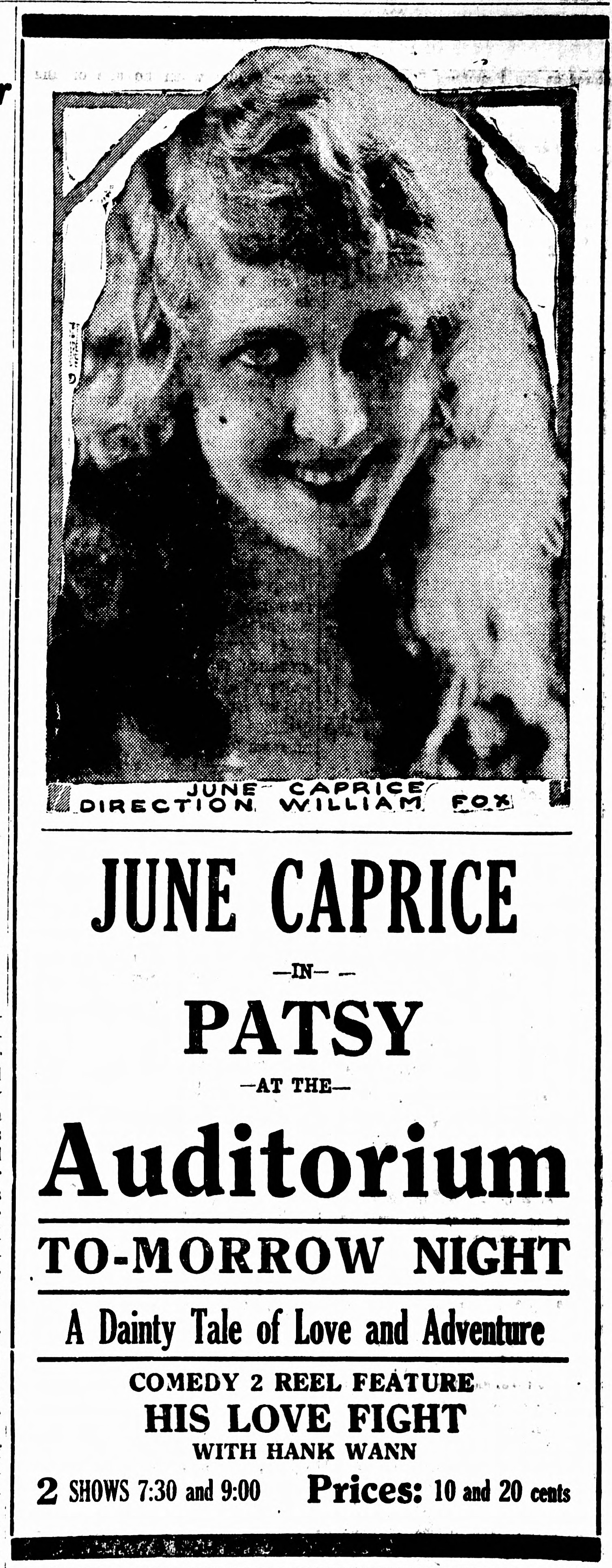
- Newspaper advertisement
- Directed by: John G. Adolfi
- Written by: Joseph F. Poland
- Produced by: William Fox
- Starring: June Caprice; Harry Hilliard; John Smiley
- Production company: Fox Film Corporation
- Distributed by: Fox Film Corporation
- Release date: July 1, 1917
- Running time: 5 reels
- Country: United States
- Language: Silent (English intertitles)

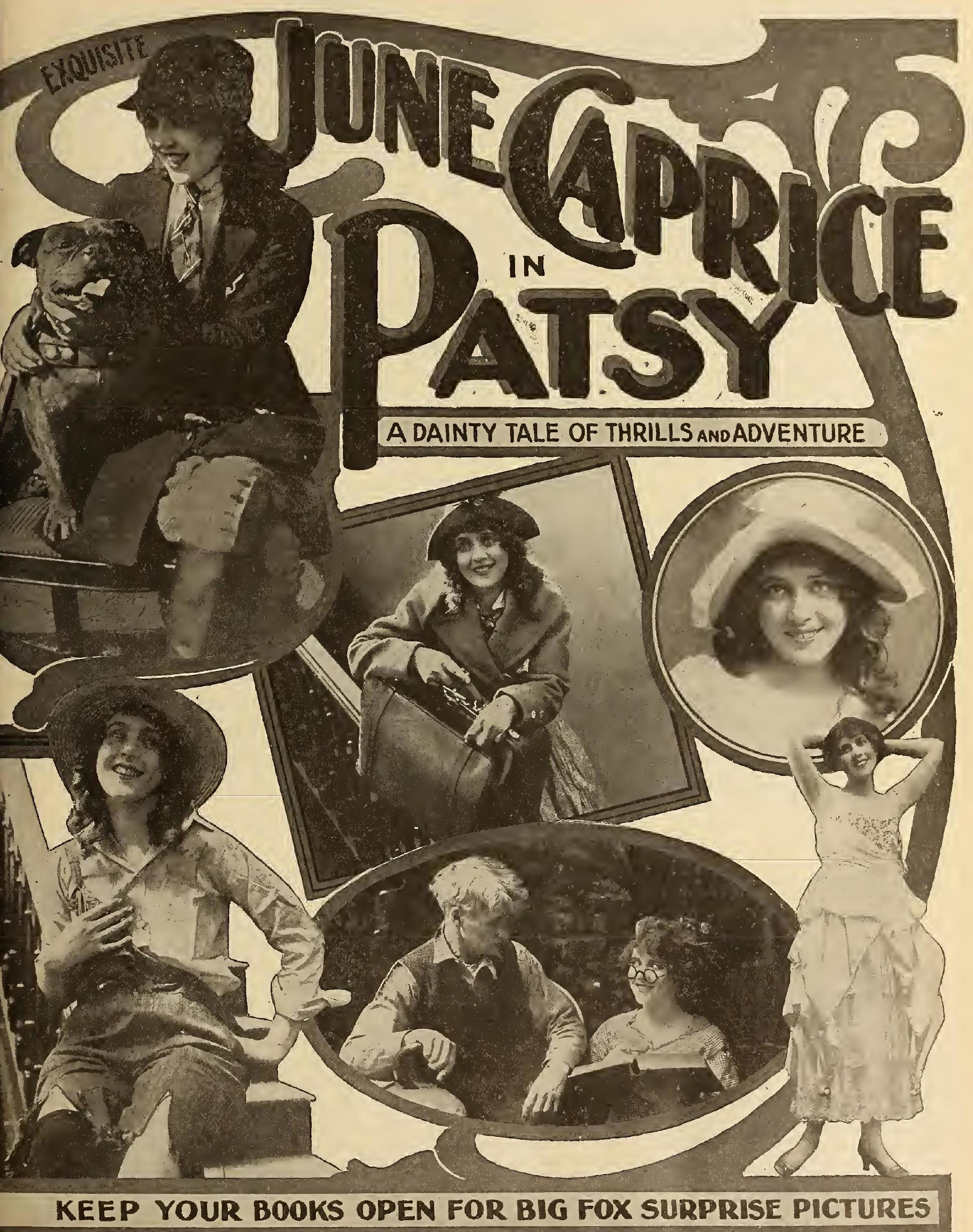
Patsy movie ad with June Caprice in Motion Picture News

Patsy is a lost 1917 American silent comedy drama film directed by John G. Adolfi and starring June Caprice, Harry Hilliard, and John Smiley.

== Cast ==
- June Caprice as Patsy Prim
- Harry Hilliard as Dick Hewitt
- John Smiley as John Primnel
- Edna Munsey as Helene Arnold
- Ethyle Cooke as Alice Hewitt
- Alma Muller as Patsy's Maid
- Fred Hearn as Griggs
- Jane Lee as Janie

== Censorship ==
Before Patsy could be exhibited in Kansas, the Kansas Board of Review required the removal of scenes where a man holds a woman's garter, a woman smoking, two views of a dancing woman, and the intertitle "Shut up! I'm not as rotten as that."

== Bibliography ==
- Solomon, Aubrey. The Fox Film Corporation, 1915-1935: A History and Filmography. McFarland, 2011.
