= Watch Your Step (film) =

1922 film

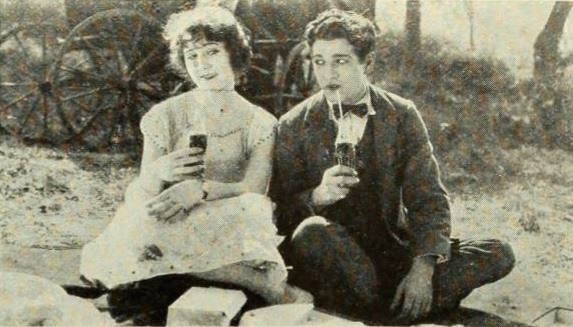
- Film still
- Directed by: William Beaudine
- Written by: Julien Josephson
- Produced by: B.P. Fineman; Samuel Goldwyn
- Starring: Cullen Landis; Patsy Ruth Miller; Bert Woodruff; George C. Pearce
- Cinematography: John J. Mescall
- Edited by: Ralph Block
- Distributed by: Goldwyn Pictures Corporation
- Release date: February 1922
- Running time: 5 reels
- Country: United States
- Language: Silent (English intertitles)

Watch Your Step is a 1922 American silent comedy film directed by William Beaudine. It stars Cullen Landis, Patsy Ruth Miller, Bert Woodruff, and George C. Pearce. Life considered the film to be a "fabulously expensive production". With no record of a print in any collection, it is likely a lost film.

== Plot ==
As described in a film magazine, Elmer Slocum, a wealthy city youth, while trying to elude the police in his high powered automobile, has a smashup and, in a rough and tumble fight with a motorcycle policeman, knocks him out. He is robbed of his clothes by a group of tramps. He tries to hide from the police in a small village in Iowa and there meets Margaret Andrews, daughter of the richest man in town. He gets a position at a grocery store run by Russ Weaver and learns that he has a rival for the hand of Margaret in Lon Kimball, son of an undertaker. In a fight with Lon, Elmer comes off victorious, but a constable arrests him. Things look dark for Elmer until his father Henry Slocum with news that the motorcycle policeman has recovered and all has been forgiven.

== Cast ==
- Cullen Landis as Elmer Slocum
- Patsy Ruth Miller as Margaret Andrews
- Bert Woodruff as Russ Weaver
- George C. Pearce as Lark Andrews
- Raymond Cannon as Lon Kimball
- Gus Leonard as Jennifer Kimball
- Harry L. Rattenberry as the Constable
- Joel Day as Ky Wilson
- L.J. O'Connor as Detective Ryan
- John Cossar as Henry Slocum
- Lillian Sylvester as Mrs. Spivey
- Louis King as Lote Spivey
- Cordelia Callahan as Mrs. Andrews
- Alberta Lee as Mrs. Weaver
