= Merely Mary Ann (play) =

1903 play by Israel Zangwill

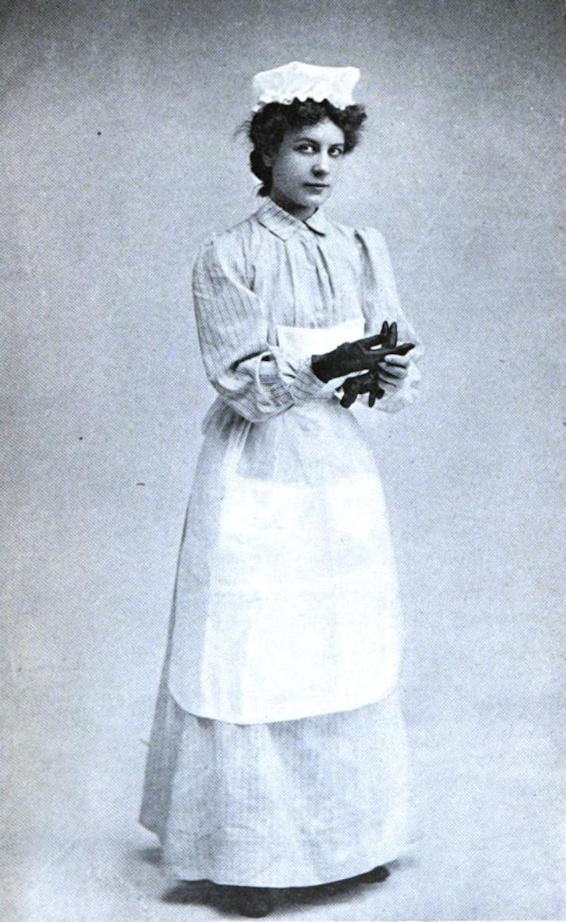
- Eleanor Robson as Mary Ann
- Original language: English
- Written by: Israel Zangwill
- Based on: Merely Mary Ann (1893) by Israel Zangwill
- Music by: Malcolm Williams
- Lyrics by: Malcolm Williams and Israel Zangwill
- Subject: Romance across social classes
- Genre: Comedy
- Setting: Lodging house in South London; Garden room of estate near Brighton

Premiere
- Date: December 28, 1903
- Place: Garden Theatre
- Directed by: Charles Cartwright

Merely Mary Ann is a 1903 play by British author Israel Zangwill. It is based on his own work of the same name, written in 1893 and later included in The Grey Wig (1903). It has four acts and three settings. The story explores the changing relationship between the younger son of a baronet, who has forsaken inheritance for composing, and an orphaned country girl, now working in a cheap London lodging house.

The play was produced by Liebler & Company, with staging by Charles Cartwright. It starred Eleanor Robson, with Edwin Arden, Ada Dwyer and Laura Hope Crews. After a two-month opening tour, it premiered on Broadway during late December 1903 and ran continuously until May 1904. It was a popular success, and helped Liebler & Company recover the money they had lost on Zangwill's Children of the Ghetto.

Liebler & Company's Merely Mary Ann opened in London during September 1904, with Eleanor Robson and Ada Dwyer but otherwise a local supporting cast. It ran for over one hundred performances, ceasing on December 15, 1904, because Eleanor Robson had to sail the next day to keep touring commitments in America. It was during this run that George Bernard Shaw first saw and met Eleanor Robson and determined to write Major Barbara with her in mind.

Eleanor Robson and Ada Dwyer reprised their roles for a brief Broadway revival starting February 1907, playing Wednesday matinees in repertory with another Liebler & Company production, Salomy Jane, in which they both starred. There were three film adaptations with the same title, but which according to stage producer George C. Tyler had little in common with the play.

== Characters ==
Lead

- Mary Ann is an orphaned farm girl, sent to work for Mrs. Leadbatter by her guardian. (Note: Both Zangwill and contemporaneous reviewers used the term "slavey" to describe Mary Ann's position.)
- Lancelot, so called, (Note: The play's dialogue makes it clear this is an alias.) younger son of a baronet, an unsuccessful composer, too proud to accept help.

Supporting

- Mrs. Leadbatter is a Cockney landlady, twice-widowed, illiterate, overly frugal, prone to malapropism, but not unkind.
- Rosie is Mrs. Leadbatter's daughter; coarse and a giggler, she affects a genteel accent and dislikes Mary Ann.
- Peter, son of a tea merchant, is Lancelot's friend from the conservatory in Leipzig, (Note: Zangwill used an old spelling, "Leipsic", for Leipzig.) who left music for business.
- Herr Brahmson is a London-based music publisher who so far has resisted Lancelot's compositions.
- Rev. Samuel Smedge is vicar in Mary Ann's home village; he is her legal guardian.
- Lady Chelmer is a poor widowed peeress, paid by Peter to "puff" his family's tea.
- Lord Valentine is a wastrel, a vain empty-headed, snobbish young man. (Note: In the play's original version, he is the son of Caroline, Countess of Foxwell, but the 1921 revision makes him the son of Lady Chelmer.)

Featured

- Pat O'Gorman is a journalist, Irish-born, seedy but good-humored, a roomer at Mrs. Leadbatter's.
- Jim Blaydes is another roomer, a medical student inclined to tipple on Saturday night.
- Polly is a music hall dancer, billed as one half of the Tippit Sisters (they aren't).
- Kitty is the other half of the Tippit Sisters, who both lodge with Mrs. Leadbatter.

The following featured characters were in Act IV of the original play. Zangwill eliminated them in his simplified 1921 revision.

- Caroline, Countess of Foxwell is friend to Lady Chelmer and Lord Valentine's mother.
- Lady Gladys Foxwell is the Countess' daughter.
- The Hon. Mrs. FitzGeorge is a society woman.
- Miss Rowena FitzGeorge is Mrs. FitzGeorge's daughter, a society beauty.
- Lady Glynn is a member of the "Smart Set".

Off-stage

- Lionel is Lancelot's older brother, who inherited the baronetcy.
- Tom is Mary Ann's older brother, who went to America and made a fortune in oil.

== Synopsis ==
The play's original Act IV was revised in 1921 by Zangwill. The waltz Kiss Me Good-Night Dear Love by Malcolm Williams and Zangwill, is a recurring leitmotif throughout the play, being sung or played by everyone. Lancelot despises it as treacle and excoriates the songwriter Keeley Lesterre. Lancelot and Peter were old school chums who studied music at Leipzig against their fathers' wishes. When Peter's father cut off his money, Lancelot paid his school fees. Though both are English, they affect German expressions when conversing, a shared bond of their conservatory days.

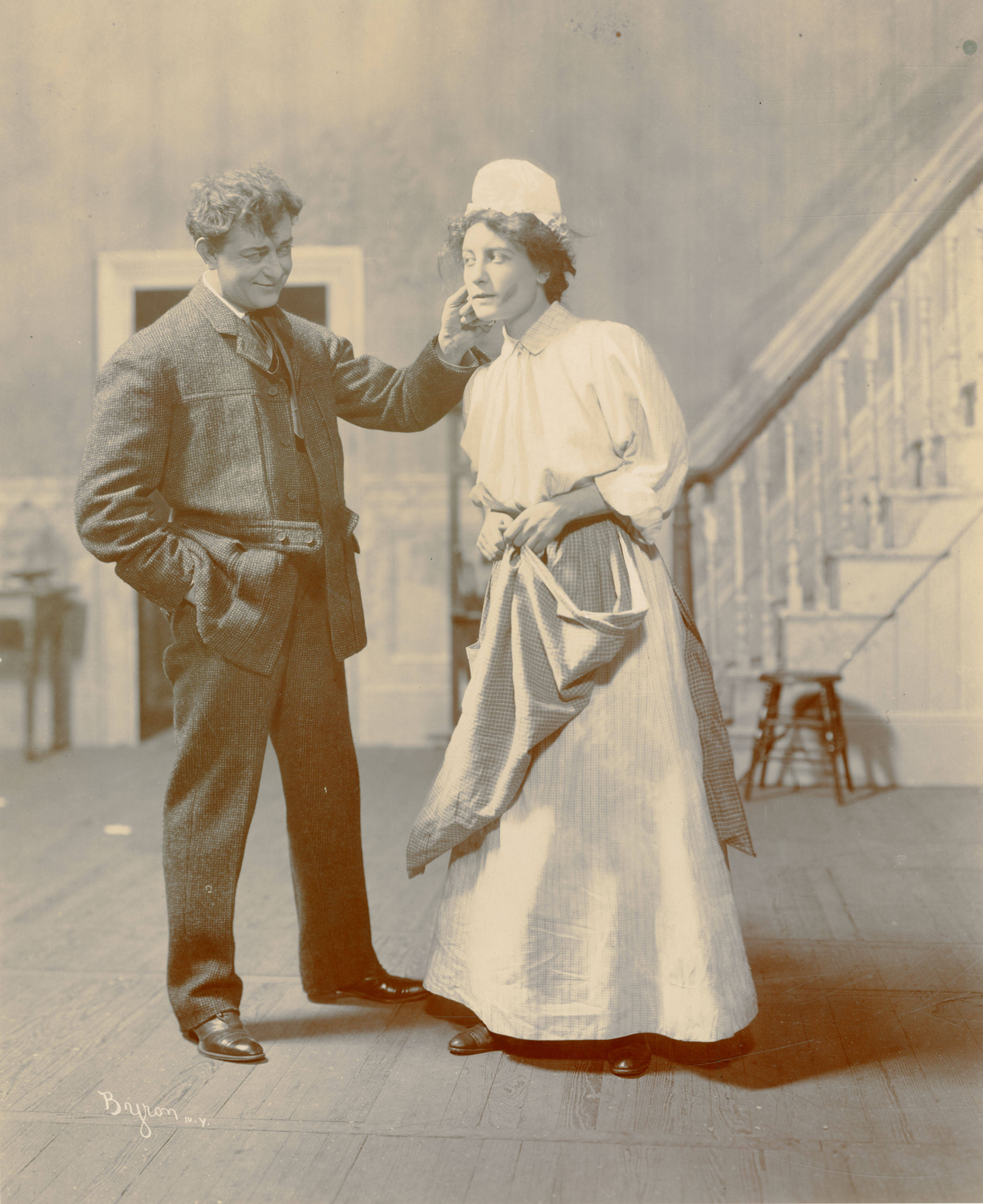

Act I (Entrance Hall of Mrs. Leadbatter's lodging house in South London, Saturday night) O'Gorman and Mrs. Leadbatter sing in unconscious harmony as the former returns from the newspaper. Mrs. Leadbatter has Rosie add an extra charge for gas to Lancelot's account; he owes so much six shillings more won't matter. Lancelot returns in Peter's carriage from the opera. They find Mary Ann holding the roomers' boots she must polish in her apron. Peter asks her name; she replies "Mary Ann", to which he asks "Merely Mary Ann?" She nods. As Peter and Lancelot go to his room, the Tippit Sisters enter from the street. They flirt a moment with Peter and laugh at Lancelot. As they go upstairs, Lancelot tears up a check Peter owes him from conservatory days. When Peter leaves, Lancelot encounters Mary Ann again. At his prompting, she talks about her childhood in the country, and how Rev. Smedge sent her to live with Mrs. Ledbetter when she was orphaned at age 13. She shyly admits she admires his music. Upset at her work-roughened hands, Lancelot says he'll buy gloves for her. She objects, fearing Mrs Leadbatter's disapproval, but he tells her wear them only in my room. She asks a favor; will he keep her canary in his room, which has more light and air? (Curtain)

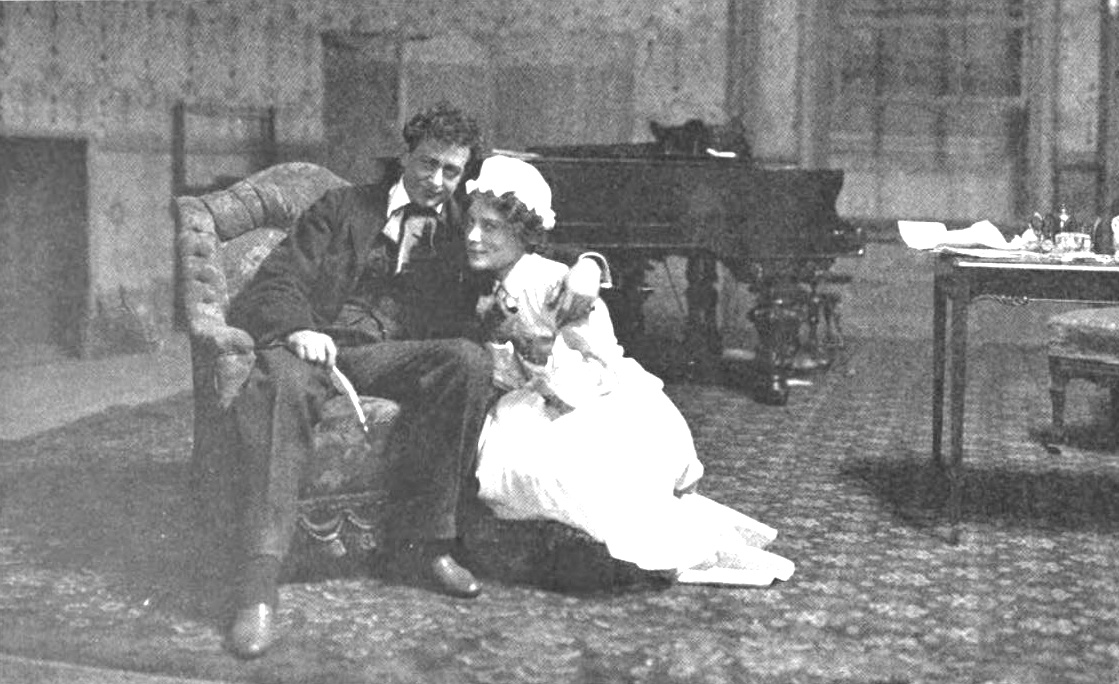

Act II (Lancelot's sitting-room, late afternoon a week later) The canary accompanies Lancelot as he plays the piano. A street musician plays Kiss Me Good-Night Dear Love outside Lancelot's window until he desperately tosses out a coin to stop it. Rosie presents a lodging bill to Lancelot which he offers to settle with a sonata in D minor. Mary Ann brings a telegram from Peter, asking if he can bring Brahmson to tea. Lancelot can't find his quill pen to reply. Mary Ann tells him she often finds it flung all over the room. Lancelot apologizes for the splashed ink and kisses her cheek, not for the first time. Mary Ann's dreamy reminiscence of the countryside has reawakened some creative urge in him. Mrs. Leadbatter suggests Lancelot settle his bill by giving Rosie piano lessons. Desperate, he agrees, but Rosie's ineptitude and coy manner irritate him. Peter's arrival saves Lancelot. Peter brings the score for Kiss Me Good-Night, Dear Love for Lancelot to study, which drives him wild. When Brahmson arrives, he brings all of Lancelot's rejected compositions. Brahmson reveals Peter is Keely Lesterre and was paid £4000 for his popular song; he advances Lancelot £40 to provide the music for lyrics to another called Adieu and Farewell. After argument, Lancelot accepts, pays Mrs. Leadbatter the lodging bill and gives notice. When alone with Mary Ann, he urges her to come with him to the country and be his housekeeper... and more. She readily accepts, nestling close to him, though he warns her they cannot marry. When Lancelot teases she doesn't know where she came from, she replies "God made me". (Curtain)

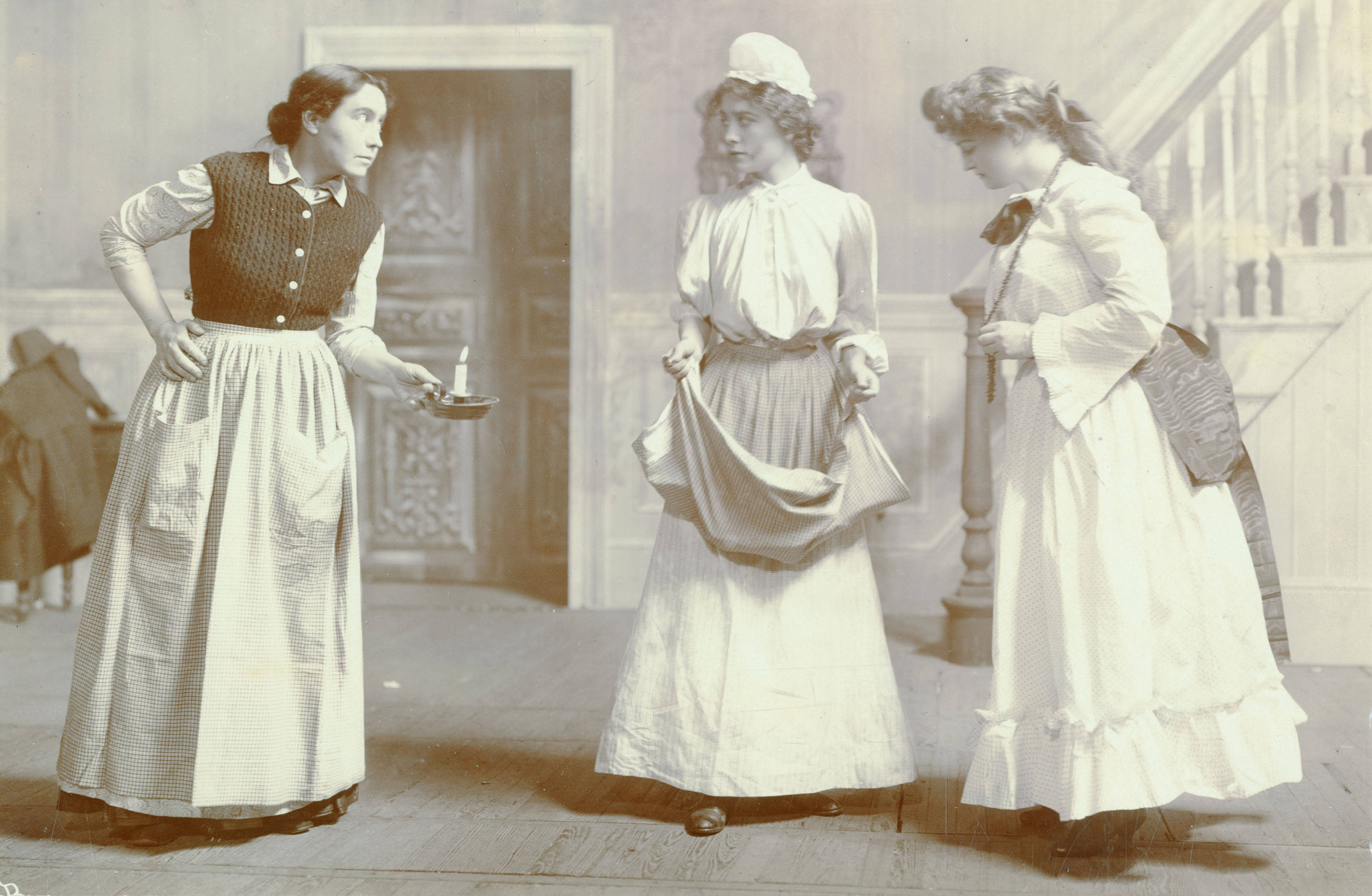

Act III (Same as Act II, evening, a week later) Mary Ann is packing Lancelot's things; he will leave for the country in the morning, and she will follow him secretly a few days later. Rosie interrupts to summon Mary Ann away. A sudden commotion from the hallway is heard as Mrs. Leadbatter and Rosie tell Mary Ann she can no longer do any work in the lodging house. Lancelot is terror-stricken when Mrs. Leadbatter sends up a clergyman to explain "what's what" to him. He fears their plan is discovered, but the Rev. Smedge enlightens him: Mary Ann's long-lost brother has died and left her £500,000. (Note: Equal to US $2.5 million at the time using the long-standing exchange rate of just less than US $5 = £1, equivalent to US $91 million in 2023. From contemporaneous reviews it appears that US $5,000,000 may have been substituted at performances for £500,000.) Mary Ann does comic battle with Rosie and Mrs. Leadbatter, trying to perform her duties which they insist are now beneath her. As he departs, Lancelot explains to Mary Ann why she must go with the Vicar to accept her legacy. She wants to give it up, or give it to Lancelot, which he refuses. Finally, she returns his polished boots with the gloves he gave her tucked inside them. As Lancelot goes out, he asks Peter for the £200 he owes from conservatory days. This will enable Lancelot to pay back Brahmson for refusing the commission. Mary Ann, left alone with the canary, sadly labels his cage with Lancelot's forwarding address and bids it to "sing pretty for him, don't let him be sad". (Curtain)

Act IV: 1921 version (A garden room on an estate near Brighton, a late afternoon in August, six years later) Rosie and Mrs. Leadbatter, dressed in fine frocks with silk parasols, stroll up to the garden room. They meet Rev. Smedge, who salutes Rosie as "Mrs. O'Gorman". Rosie's husband, now a music critic, is at the festival where Lancelot's new composition is to be played. Smedge sends them off to a copse where Mary Ann may be found. He has seen Lady Chelmer approaching and wishes to be alone with her. Lady Chelmer has been guiding Mary Ann, now styled Miss Marian, in learning the speech and manners of the gentility. Both she and Smedge have done well financially from their association with Miss Marian. Now Lady Chelmer suggests her son, Lord Valentine, as a husband for Miss Marian. Smedge acquiesces after some mutual recriminations over each other's venality. Miss Marian enters the now deserted garden room; she sits at the piano. Lord Valentine comes by, having been persuaded to romance Miss Marian. She drives him away by relating her background as a menial. Peter and Lanceleot wander into the garden room, having walked the nine miles from Brighton to escape the festival there. Peter doesn't recognize Miss Marian; he has come to see Lady Chelmer. Miss Marian sends him to the manor house, but Lancelot lingers. He suspects its Mary Ann, but she says that person is gone. Lancelot tries to rekindle their affection, but Miss Marian bids him good-bye and leaves. He plays Kiss Me Good-Night, Dear Love on the piano, and suddenly Miss Marian reappears, wearing her old apron and cap: Mary Ann has returned. (Curtain)

== Original production ==
=== Background ===
Merely Mary Ann was first published in London during March 1893 by Raphael Tuck & Sons. The little volume (118 pages) sold for a shilling, and was illustrated by the author's brother, Mark Zangwill. The book was available in the US from May 1893.

Liebler & Company was a partnership between investor Theodore A. Liebler and producer-manager George C. Tyler. Tyler had spotted Eleanor Robson at Hamlin's Grand Opera House in Chicago, playing a small part in Arizona, and became determined to sign her to a personal management contract. Robson had read The Grey Wig: Stories and Novelettes by Israel Zangwill, which contained the novelette Merely Mary Ann, and suggested to him it would make a good play. Though Liebler & Company had lost money producing Zangwill's Children of the Ghetto, they were willing to take a chance on Merely Mary Ann.

To preserve the English copyright, a single performance of the work was given at Wallingford, Oxfordshire, on October 22, 1903. The actors, mostly literary friends of Zangwill, merely read their parts. Elsa Steele played Mary Ann, Zangwill himself portrayed Herr Brahmson, while Jerome K. Jerome took the part of Peter. Sir Arthur Conan Doyle was slated to do Rev. Smedge, but had to bow out. The performance of Anthony Hope, who read the part of Lancelot, was said to be "simply unmentionable".

=== Cast ===
Principal cast for the opening tour and during the original Broadway run.
Role	Actor	Dates	Notes and sources
Mary Ann	Eleanor Robson	Oct 29, 1903 - May 7, 1904	
Lancelot	Edwin Arden	Oct 29, 1903 - May 7, 1904	
Mrs. Leadbatter	Ada Dwyer	Oct 29, 1903 - May 7, 1904	
Rosie	Laura Hope Crews	Oct 29, 1903 - Feb 17, 1904	Crews left to join the cast of Ranson's Folly
Rosie	Frances Stevens	Feb 18, 1904 - May 7, 1904	
Mr. Peter	Frank Doane	Oct 29, 1903 - May 7, 1904	
Herr Brahmson	Guy Nichols	Oct 29, 1903 - Dec 26, 1903	
Herr Brahmson	Herbert Carr	Dec 28, 1903 - May 7, 1904	
Rev. Samuel Smedge	W. A. Hackett	Oct 29, 1903 - May 7, 1904	
O'Gorman	Henry Robinson	Oct 29, 1903 - May 7, 1904	
Jim Blaydes	Thomas Graham	Oct 29, 1903 - May 7, 1904	Besides his small role, Graham functioned as stage manager for the production.
Polly Tippit	Esther Beeman	Oct 29, 1903 - Nov 22, 1903	
Polly Tippit	Ethel Strickland	Dec 15, 1903 - May 7, 1904	
Kitty Tippit	Helen Arnton	Oct 29, 1903 - Nov 22, 1903	
Kitty Tippit	Mabel Strickland	Dec 15, 1903 - May 7, 1904	
Lord Valentine	Arthur Story	Oct 29, 1903 - May 7, 1904	
Lady Chelmer	Ida Lewis	Oct 29, 1903 - May 7, 1904	
Countess Foxwell	Grace Thorn Coulter	Oct 29, 1903 - Dec 26, 1903	
Countess Foxwell	Kate Pattison Selden	Dec 28, 1903 - May 7, 1904	
Gladys Foxwell	Ethel Strickland	Oct 29, 1903 - Dec 26, 1903	
Gladys Foxwell	Julia Dean	Dec 28, 1903 - May 7, 1904	
Mrs. FitzGeorge	Marguerite St. John	Oct 29, 1903 - May 7, 1904	
Rowena FitzGeorge	Mabel Strickland	Oct 29, 1903 - Dec 26, 1903	
Rowena FitzGeorge	Ethel Strickland	Dec 28, 1903 - May 7, 1904	
Lady Glynn	Margaret Fuller	Oct 29, 1903 - May 7, 1904	

=== Opening tour ===
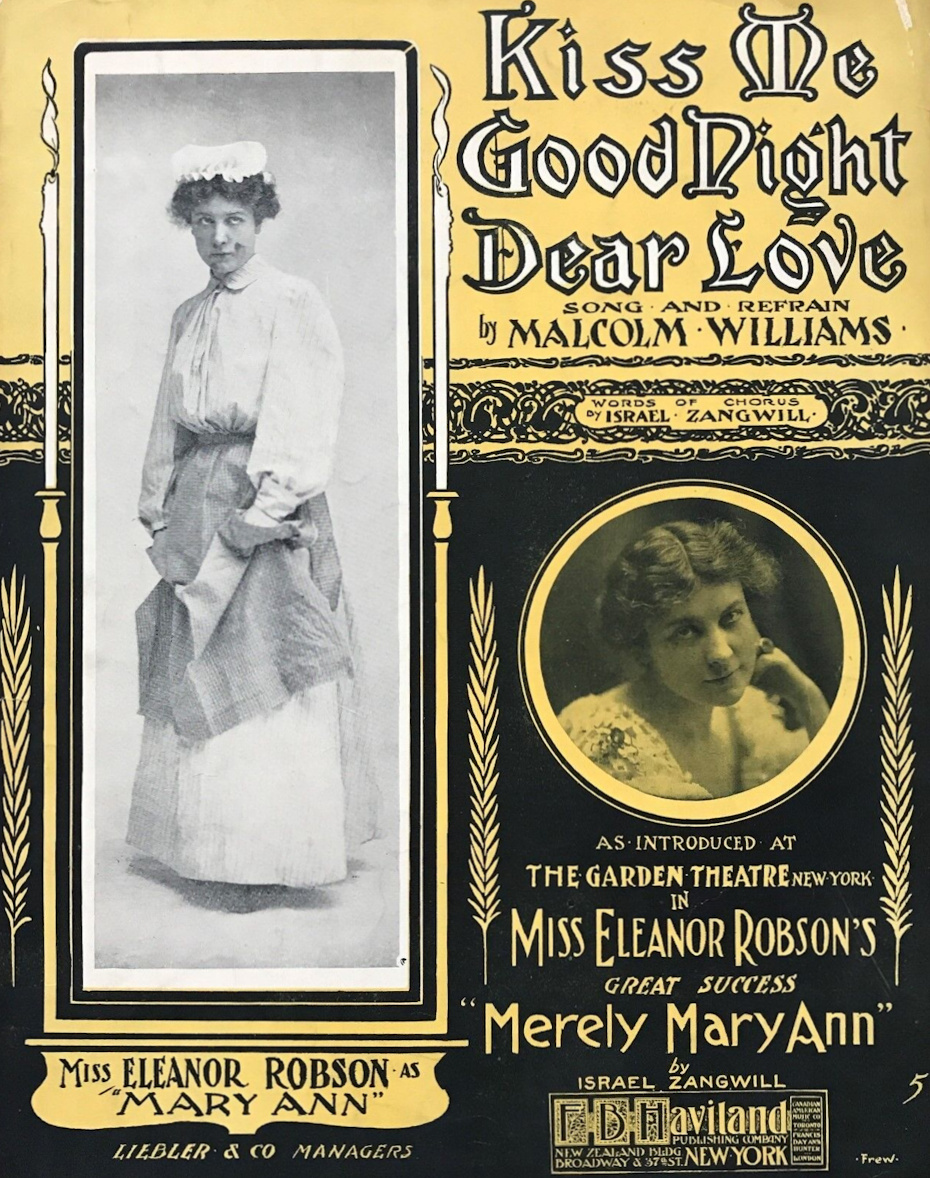

Merely Mary Ann was first performed at the Lyceum Theatre in Scranton, Pennsylvania, on October 29, 1903. The local critic was not impressed with the play, saying it lacked drama and contrast, and called the settings "nothing". They recognized Eleanor Robson's potential, but thought the staging gave her little chance to shine. Edwin Arden, Ada Dwyer, and Laura Hope Crews were deemed good, but the rest of the cast only "fair". It then went to the Garrick Theater in Chicago on November 2, 1903, for two weeks. Here W. L. Hubbard of the Chicago Tribune called it "a play as sweet and clean and as truly human as the Chicago stage has offered in many a day", phrasing that Liebler & Company used thereafter in advance advertising.

The production travelled east, doing one night performances in Indianapolis, Dayton, Ohio, Chillicothe, Ohio, (Note: This small city was favored with a visit as it was producer George C. Tyler's hometown.) and Rochester, New York. The Indianapolis Journal reviewer expressed a common opinion about the fourth act, that it was "unnatural" and "hardly worthy of a detailed description". The Dayton Herald critic thought the play "a sweet, simple story told by two principals" with the other players barely necessary, but chided Liebler & Company anyway for a supporting cast that was "incompetant" and "weak". Within a month, cast lists showed four performers had been dropped and three new ones added, and two actresses reassigned to other roles.

=== Premiere and reception ===
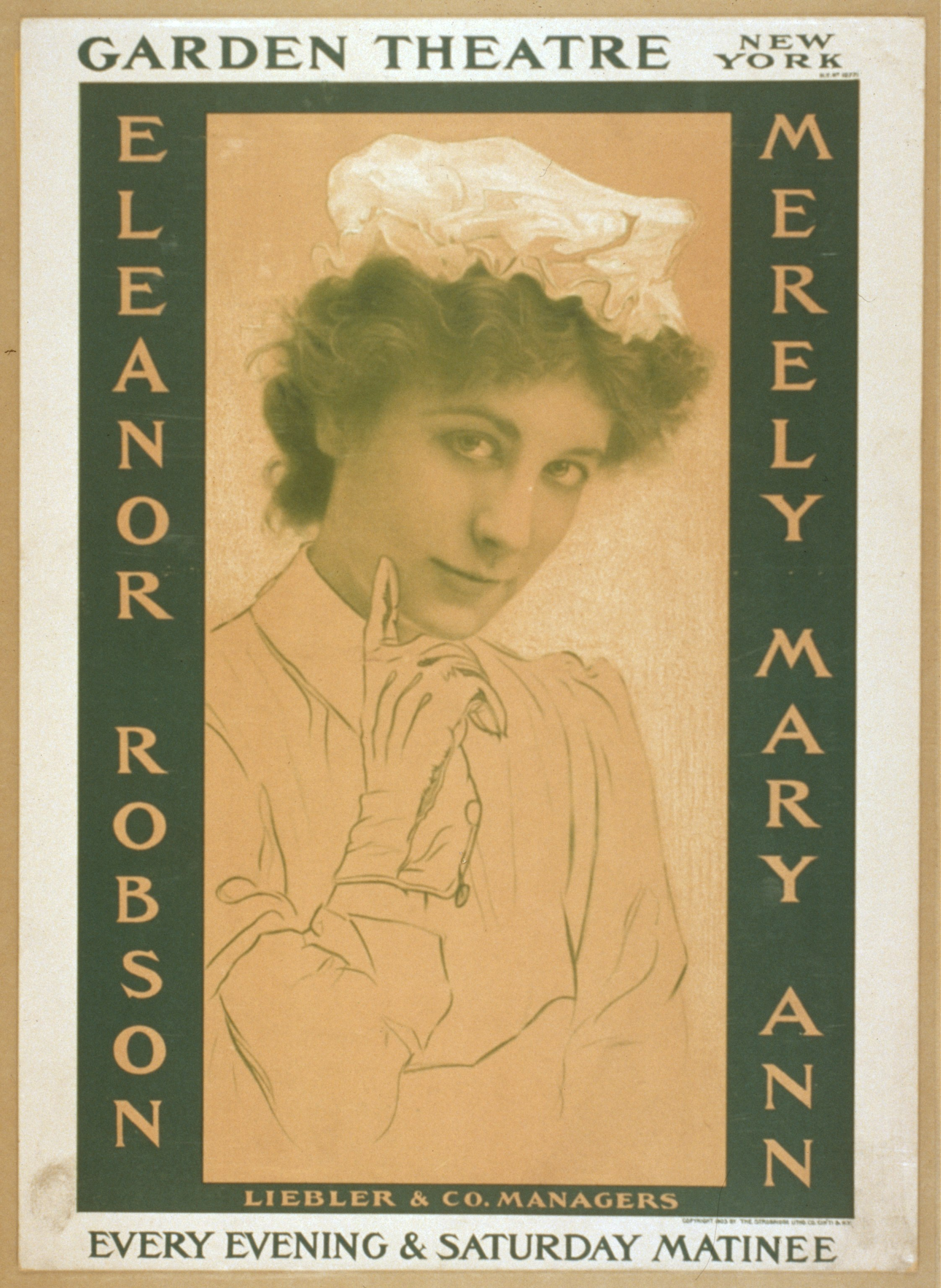

The play had its Broadway premiere at the Garden Theatre on December 28, 1903. The reviewer for the New-York Tribune said Eleanor Robson understood the character but failed to move her audience, through inexperience and obvious imitation of Maude Adams. This was an outlier opinion; the Brooklyn Times critic spoke for the mainstream when they said "Eleanor Robson as Mary Ann scored a conspicuous success". The Brooklyn Citizen concurred, reporting that Robson was well received by the large audience and expressed the character with the "most delicious naivete imaginable" without strain. The Evening World went even further, saying she "had all the women in the theatre in tears at the end of the third act".

The critic for The Sun focused on the incongruity of following three acts of sentiment, humor, and charm, with Act IV: "It is almost superfluous, and the introduction of a lot of stupid people is a wicked mistake". The reviewer also found the German "trying", (Note: Presumably the badinage between Lancelot and Peter.) but thought both the play and its star "made a highly favorable impression". The New York Times reviewer pointed up the contrast in the characters of Mary Ann and Lancelot; how she was natural and without pretense, while he affects a moral position that won't let him accept interest on Peter's debt but allows him to take advantage of a poor innocent. This reviewer thought Eleanor Robson's playing "most satisfying" while Edwin Arden, though good, was too precise and reserved. They also praised both Ada Dwyer's landlady and W. A. Hackett's vicar.

=== Changes of venue ===
After fifty performances the production closed at the Garden Theatre on February 13, 1904, and re-opened at the Criterion Theatre on February 15, 1904. The MacMillan Company issued a new edition of the novelette Merely Mary Ann, illustrated with photos from the stage play, on February 20, 1904. The New York Times reported that even a week after moving Merely Mary Ann was still "drawing big crowds at the Criterion". On March 28, 1904, the production celebrated one hundred performances on Broadway by distributing souvenir copies of Zangwill's original story to the audience.

Merely Mary Ann finished at the Criterion on April 2, 1904, reopening at the Garrick Theatre on April 4, 1904.

=== Closing ===
The Broadway run of Merely Mary Ann closed at the Garrick Theatre on May 7, 1904, after 148 performances. The final night's performance was marked by long applause after every act and floral bouquets filling the lobby, "the greenroom and the star's dressing room".

== Adaptations ==
=== Film ===
In his 1934 memoir producer George C. Tyler said only Eleanor Robson could play the role of Mary Ann: "When she left the stage we should have collected all the copies of Merely Mary Ann and burned them... How I suffered when I saw what the movies did to Merely Mary Ann a long while afterward".

- Merely Mary Ann (1916).
- Merely Mary Ann (1920).
- Merely Mary Ann (1931).

== Bibliography ==
- George C. Tyler and J. C. Furnas. Whatever Goes Up. Bobbs Merrill, 1934.
- Israel Zangwill. Merely Mary Ann. The MacMillan Company, 1904. (Special edition of the novelette with photos from the play).
- Israel Zangwill. Merely Mary Ann: A Comedy in Four Acts. Samuel French (Canada) Ltd., 1921. (Act IV was rewritten by Zangwill in 1921).
