= A Modern Thelma =

1916 film by John G. Adolfi

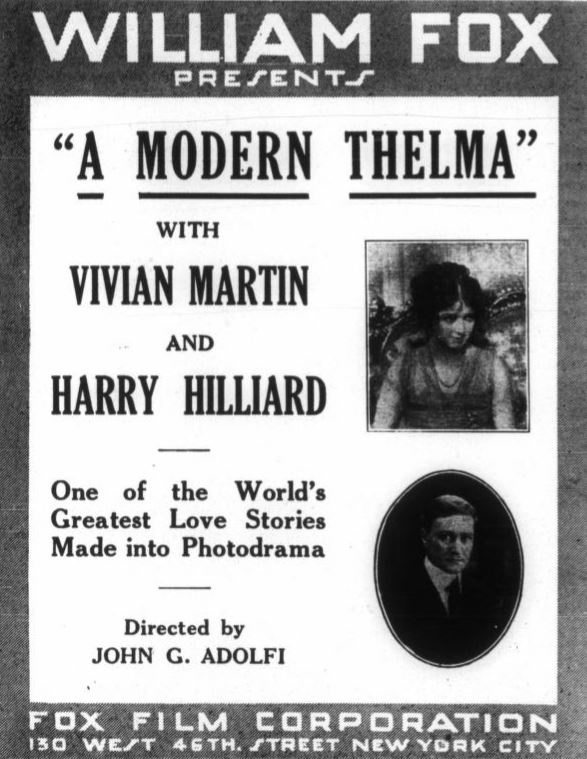
- Directed by: John G. Adolfi
- Written by: Marie Corelli (novel); John G. Adolfi
- Produced by: William Fox
- Starring: Vivian Martin; Harry Hilliard; William H. Tooker
- Cinematography: Hugh McClung
- Production company: Fox Film
- Distributed by: Fox Film
- Release date: April 16, 1916
- Running time: 50 minutes
- Country: United States
- Languages: Silent; English intertitles

A Modern Thelma is a 1916 American silent drama film directed by John G. Adolfi and starring Vivian Martin, Harry Hilliard and William H. Tooker.

== Cast ==
- Vivian Martin as Thelma
- Harry Hilliard as Sir Philip
- William H. Tooker as Thelma's Father
- Albert Roccardi
- Maud Sinclair
- Elizabeth Kennedy
- Allan Walker
- Stuart Russell
- Albert Jovell
- Richard Neill
- Pauline Barry
- Flora Nason
- Lila Leslie
- Gladys Wynne

== Bibliography ==
- Solomon, Aubrey. The Fox Film Corporation, 1915-1935: A History and Filmography. McFarland, 2011.
