= Driven by Fate =

1915 film by John G. Adolfi

- Directed by: John G. Adolfi
- Starring: William Garwood; Violet Mersereau; Florence Crawford; Tammany Young; Conrad Cantzen
- Distributed by: Universal Film Manufacturing Company
- Release date: August 13, 1915
- Country: United States
- Languages: Silent film (English intertitles)

Driven by Fate is a 1915 American silent short drama film directed by John G. Adolfi and starring William Garwood and Violet Mersereau. The film, released by the Independent Moving Pictures (Imp) brand of the Universal Film Manufacturing Company, also features Florence Crawford, Tammany Young, and Conrad Cantzen.

== Plot ==
The story follows a young, impoverished girl who is the sole provider for her blind and invalid mother. She is relentlessly pursued by a wealthy man of dissolute character. Meanwhile, a young artist, who is grappling with his own life's challenges, resides in the same tenement building. Driven to desperation by their circumstances, both the girl and the artist independently decide to end their lives by turning on the gas in their respective rooms.

A twist of fate intervenes when a draft of wind from the hallway extinguishes the artist's gas jet. He awakens and, upon discovering the girl's suicide attempt, rushes to her room and saves her. This shared near-death experience forges a bond between them, and together they find a new, hopeful outlook on life.

== Reception ==
A review in the August 7, 1915, issue of The Moving Picture World described the film as a "very appealing offering." The reviewer praised the plot for its "vein of pathos" and the "pleasing" acting of the lead players, William Garwood and Violet Mersereau. The review also noted the film's "good moral" and its overall "wholesome" nature.
