= Sidney Bracey =

American actor (1877–1942)

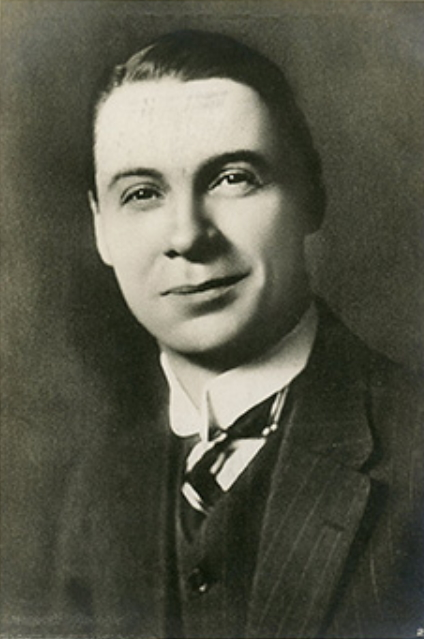
- Bracey, c. 1914
- Born: 18 December 1877; Melbourne, Australia
- Died: 5 August 1942 (aged 64); Hollywood, California, US
- Occupation: Actor
- Years active: 1909–1942
- Parent(s): Henry Bracy; Clara T. Bracy
- Relatives: Lydia Thompson (aunt)

Sidney Bracey (born Sidney Bracy; 18 December 1877 – 5 August 1942) was an Australian-born American actor. Born into an acting family, he began a stage career in Australia, on Broadway and in Britain usually as leading men in musicals and comic operas, and in roles straight theatre, including Shakespeare plays. He then performed in more than 320 films between 1909 and 1942, remembered for his character roles as sometimes exasperated men in authority, such as bosses, directors, and, especially, respectable butlers. He also continued to perform on stage, including in vaudeville.

== Early life and stage career ==
Bracey was born in Melbourne, Victoria, with the name Sidney Bracy, later changing the spelling of his last name. He was the son of Welsh tenor Henry Bracy and English actress Clara T. Bracy. His aunt was the actress and dancer Lydia Thompson. He was educated at Melbourne University.

He began his stage career in Australia in the 1890s, with J. C. Williamson's comic opera companies. On Broadway, in 1900, he appeared as the tenor lead, Yussuf, in the first American production of The Rose of Persia at Daly's Theatre in New York. He then moved to England, creating the role of Moreno in the Edwardian musical comedy hit The Toreador at the Gaiety Theatre, London in June 1901. He next joined the D'Oyly Carte Opera Company on tour in Britain, playing another leading tenor, Terence O'Brian, in The Emerald Isle from September 1901 to May 1902. He continued his stage career in Britain, creating the role of Lupin in Gaston Serpette's comic opera Amorelle at London's Comedy Theatre in 1904, followed by an appearance in The Winter's Tale at Broadway's Knickerbocker Theatre and Twelfth Night in 1904 to 1905. He created another musical role, Mustapha, in A Persian Princess at Queen's Theatre in London in 1909, Back on Broadway, in 1912, he played Sir Guy of Gisborne in a revival of Reginald de Koven's Robin Hood at the New Amsterdam Theatre, followed by Rob Roy at the Liberty Theatre in 1913.

== Film career ==
Bracey then moved into film acting, making first silent films and then "talkies", until his death in 1942, while also performing in live vaudeville acts, including together with friends such as Frank Farrington and James Cruze. Early in his film career, from 1913 to 1915, he worked for the Thanhouser Company in dozens of films, often playing butler roles, such as in The Million Dollar Mystery. There he co-wrote and directed a silent movie called Sid Nee's Finish (1914), in which he played the title character. In 1914, he married Evelyn Forshay. After Thanhouser, he worked with several major studios. By 1916, he changed the spelling of his last name to "Bracey". Silent film authority Diane MacIntyre gave this description of him: "Bracey, a stately looking character man, was in big demand for authority like roles; such as movie directors, bosses and, most of the time, the most respectable and poised butler in all of Hollywood. He was thin, dark haired and had an earnest, yet sober, face that could break into a look of wide-eyed exasperation."

== Personal life and death ==
Bracey and his wife, Evelyn, had a son and two daughters. He died in Cedars of Lebanon Hospital in Hollywood, California, on 5 August 1942, aged 64. He was buried in Calvary Cemetery in East Los Angeles.

== Selected filmography ==
- Adrift in a Great City (1914 short)
- The Million Dollar Mystery (1914)
- The Man Inside (1916)
- Merely Mary Ann (1916)
- A Huntress of Men (1916)
- Caprice of the Mountains (1916)
- The Ragged Princess (1916)
- Crime and Punishment (1917)
- A Man's World (1918)
- The Invisible Ray (1920 serial)
- An Amateur Devil (1920)
- Food for Scandal (1920)
- Passion Fruit (1921)
- The Outside Woman (1921)
- The March Hare (1921)
- Crazy to Marry (1921)
- Morals (1921)
- Midnight (1922)
- The Dictator (1922)
- The Radio King (1922)
- One Wonderful Night (1922)
- The Social Buccaneer (1923)
- Merry-Go-Round (1923)
- Ruggles of Red Gap (1923)
- The Courtship of Miles Standish (1923)
- The Wild Party (1923)
- Why Men Leave Home (1924)
- Her Night of Romance (1924)
- By Divine Right (1924)
- So This Is Marriage (1924)
- The White Desert (1925)
- A Slave of Fashion (1925)
- The Merry Widow (1925)
- Wandering Footsteps (1925)
- The Blackbird (1926)
- A Bankrupt Honeymoon (1926)
- The Devil's Circus (1926)
- Beverly of Graustark (1926)
- A Man Four-Square (1926)
- Paris (1926)
- The Mystery Club (1926)
- The Thirteenth Juror (1927)
- Birds of Prey (1927)
- The Woman on Trial (1927)
- The Cameraman (1928)
- The Cossacks (1928)
- Home, James (1928)
- Man-Made Women (1928)
- Win That Girl (1928)
- The Haunted House (1928)
- Show People (1928)
- His Captive Woman (1929)
- Sioux Blood (1929)
- Children of Pleasure (1930)
- Outside the Law (1930)
- The Lion and the Lamb (1931)
- Shanghaied Love (1931)
- A Dangerous Affair (1931)
- New Adventures of Get Rich Quick Wallingford (1931)
- The Monster Walks (1932)
- Love Bound (1932)
- The Intruder (1933)
- What! No Beer? (1933)
- Broken Dreams (1933)
- The Woman Who Dared (1933)
- The Ninth Guest (1934)
- Eight Bells (1935)
- I've Been Around (1935)
- Anna Karenina (1935)
- Second Childhood (1936)
- Isle of Fury (1936) as Sam
- Three Smart Boys (1937)
- Breakfast for Two (1937)
- Merrily We Live (1938)
- My Bill (1938)
- The Sun Never Sets (1939)
- Devil's Island (1939)
- On Trial (1939)
- King of the Underworld (1939)
- Affectionately Yours (1941)
- The Body Disappears (1941)
