= Truth in the Wilderness =

1913 film

- Directed by: Lorimer Johnston
- Produced by: Samuel S. Hutchinson
- Starring: Charlotte Burton; George Periolat; J. Warren Kerrigan; Jack Richardson
- Distributed by: Mutual Film
- Release date: July 14, 1913
- Country: United States
- Languages: Silent film English intertitles

Truth in the Wilderness is a 1913 American silent short drama film directed by Lorimer Johnston. It stars Charlotte Burton, George Periolat, J. Warren Kerrigan, and Jack Richardson, with additional performances by Lillian Leighton and Vivian Rich.
