= John G. Adolfi =

American actor, film director, and screenwriter

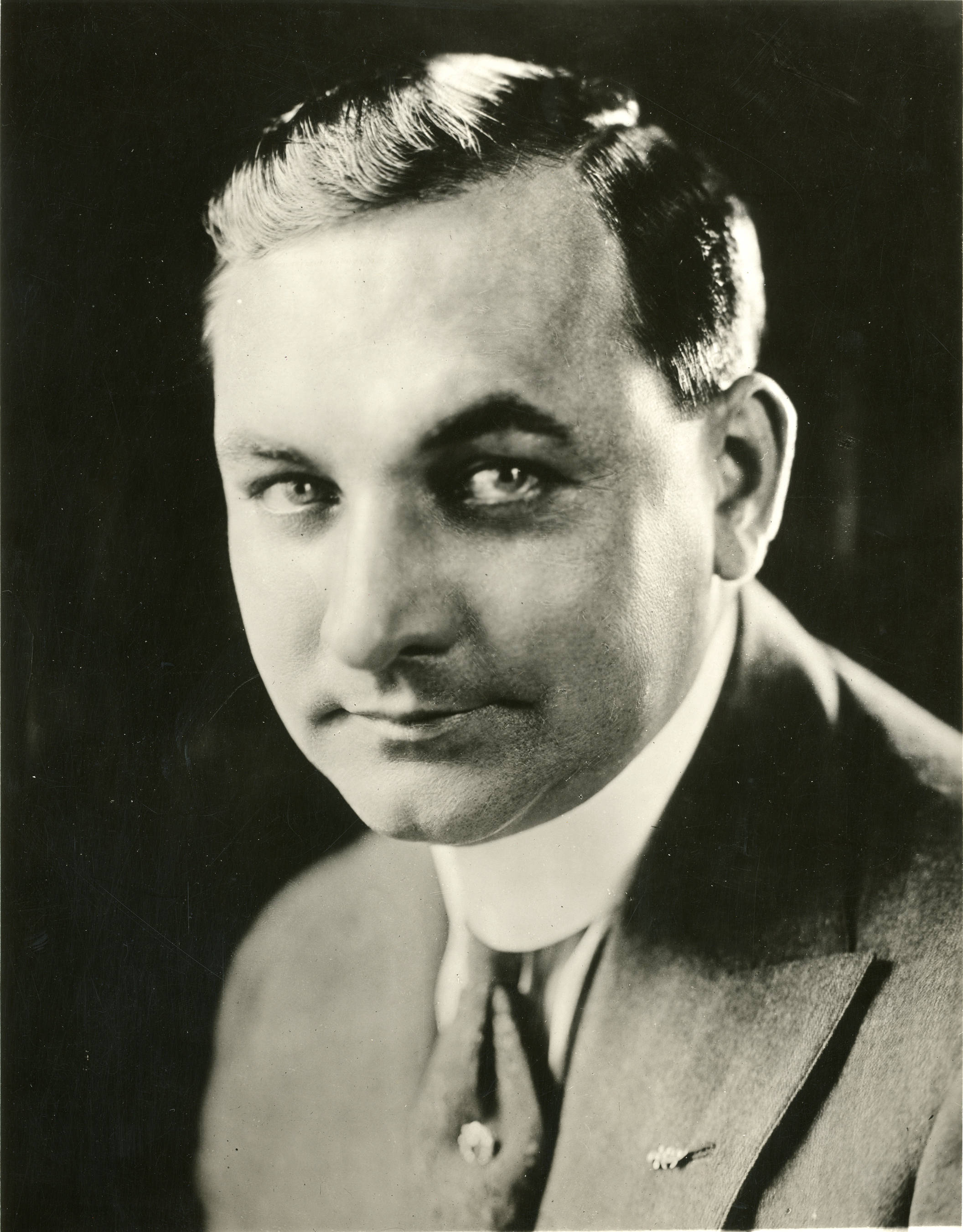
- Adolfi c. 1920
- Born: February 19, 1888; New York City, U.S.
- Died: May 11, 1933 (aged 45); British Columbia, Canada
- Other names: Jack Adolfi; John G. Adolphi
- Occupations: Silent film director; Actor; Screenwriter
- Years active: 1907–1933

John Gustav Adolfi (February 19, 1888 – May 11, 1933) was an American silent film director, actor, and screenwriter who was involved in more than 100 productions throughout his career. An early acting credit was in the recently restored 1912 film Robin Hood.

== Biography ==
He was born in New York City to Gustav Adolfi and Jennie Reinhardt. Adolfi entered films as an actor in The Spy: A Romantic Story of the Civil War in 1907, but after appearing in thirty or so films he switched roles and concentrated on directing until his death in 1933 from a brain hemorrhage in British Columbia, Canada while hunting bears.

== Filmography ==
=== Director ===
- The Fight for Freedom (1908)
- The Kentuckian (1908)
- Robin Hood (1912)
- Through the Sluice Gates (1913, short)
- Driven by Fate (1915, short)
- The Man Inside (1916)
- Caprice of the Mountains (1916)
- Merely Mary Ann (1916)
- The Mischief Maker (1916)
- A Modern Thelma (1916)
- Little Miss Happiness (1916)
- The Sphinx (1916)
- The Ragged Princess (1916)
- A Modern Cinderella (1917)
- A Child of the Wild (1917)
- The Small Town Girl (1917)
- Patsy (1917)
- The Woman the Germans Shot (1918)
- The Heart of a Girl (1918)
- The Burden of Proof (1918)
- Queen of the Sea (1918)
- Who's Your Brother? (1919)
- The Amazing Woman (1920)
- The Wonder Man (1920)
- The Little 'Fraid Lady (1920)
- The Darling of the Rich (1922)
- The Little Red Schoolhouse (1923)
- What Shall I Do? (1924)
- Chalk Marks (1924)
- Before Midnight (1925)
- The Scarlet West (1925)
- Big Pal (1925)
- The Phantom Express (1925)
- The Checkered Flag (1926)
- Husband Hunters (1927)
- What Happened to Father? (1927)
- The Little Snob (1928)
- Sinner's Parade (1928)
- The Devil's Skipper (1928)
- The Midnight Taxi (1928)
- Prowlers of the Sea (1928)
- Fancy Baggage (1929)
- In the Headlines (1929)
- Show of Shows (1929)
- Evidence (1929)
- Dumbbells in Ermine (1930)
- Recaptured Love (1930)
- College Lovers (1930)
- Sinners' Holiday (1930)
- The Millionaire (1931)
- Alexander Hamilton (1931)
- Compromised (1931)
- The Man Who Played God (1932)
- A Successful Calamity (1932)
- Central Park (1932)
- The King's Vacation (1933)
- The Working Man (1933)
- Voltaire (1933)
