= The Little Mother =

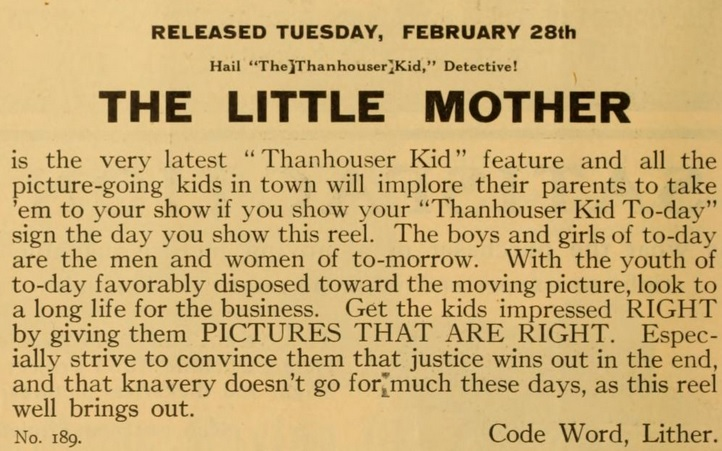
- Advertisement in The Moving Picture World
- Starring: Marie Eline
- Production company: Thanhouser Company
- Distributed by: Motion Picture Distributors and Sales Company
- Release date: February 28, 1911
- Running time: 1 reel
- Country: United States
- Languages: Silent film English intertitles

The Little Mother is a 1911 American silent short drama film produced by the Thanhouser Company. The film stars Marie Eline who goes to her mother's employer and asks for her mother's job after she dies. Her employer is an artist with a kind heart and though the girl does not do the chores well. One of the artists models plot against him makes false charges against him, leading to his arrest. The little girl follows them and learns that they were out to obtain a large amount of money to have the false case dropped. She reports it to the police and the artist is freed, whereby he adopts the girl out of gratitude. Released on February 28, 1911, the film received mixed reviews. The film is presumed lost.

== Plot ==
The official summary synopsis of the film was published in The Moving Picture World. It states, "A poor widow who supports her two children, one a baby and the other girl of six, by scrubbing, weakens under her hard work, and finally dies. Marie, the 'little mother,' anxious that her home may not be broken up, calls on one of her mother's employers and requests that she be given a chance to take the dead woman's place. The artist, a wealthy, good-hearted man, pleased with the child's pluck, laughingly employs her, and makes her believe that she is really doing all the 'chores.' The artist's kindness, much to his surprise, brings him recompense one thousand fold [sic]. One of his models plots to fleece him. She calls at his studio, faints in his arms, and when her confederate rushes in with a policeman, she makes charges that lead to the arrest of the innocent artist. Just as the policeman is leading her benefactor away, the little scrub woman sees what is happening. She follows the party to the police station, but is afraid to enter. When the complainant and her husband come out, the child is impressed with the fact that they seem to be on the best of terms. Her suspicions are aroused, and she shadows them like a regular detective. What crook would ever imagine that a little girl, wheeling a baby carriage, was a sleuth? This pair certainly did not, for when they meet a new friend in the park, they stop to tell him how they successfully arranged to trim a rich artist, never doubting that he would pay liberally to have the case dropped. The little girl, from her place in hiding, heard the story. So the little girl found a policeman, and told him about it. And the policeman went with her to the hiding place, and heard enough to warrant him in making what he afterward described as a 'two handed collar.' The adventurous and her confederate were hailed to the police station and locked up, while the artist was set free in a hurry. The result is that there is now a 'scrub woman' whose duties are a sinecure although the wages are high, and the future of the 'little mother' and her baby are assured."

== Production ==
The only credit known in the production is that of Marie Eline in the role of the little mother. Known and advertised prominently as the "Thanhouser Kid", Marie Eline received more attention than other Thanhouser staff. Historian Q. David Bowers wrote, "Her versatile acting was a major contributor to the success that the Thanhouser Company enjoyed during its formative years." The film harkens back to the role played by Eline in her film debut, A 29-Cent Robbery, in which she played a child detective to capture a thief.

== Release and reception ==
The single reel drama, approximately 990 feet long, was released on February 28, 1911. The film received mixed reviews by critics with the sharpest criticism of the improbable and illogical feats the "little mother" would perform. The Billboard said, "There is too much of the made-to-order situations in this film, causing the spectator to stretch his imagination to the straining point. That a little tot can accomplish in a way of detective work the feat set to 'kid' actor in this film performs, is hardly logical. The acting of the Thanhouser tot is great, giving the picture the greater part of the interest it contains. The other players acquit themselves well." The Moving Picture World largely agreed, but stated that the film only had one or two parts of the film were weak and the photography and acting were good. The Morning Telegraph found that the film would have been more logical should a scene with a police court to release the artist, for the police would not have been able to release them otherwise after the charges had been brought forth. The New York Dramatic Mirror review however states that this scene did occur with Marie acting outside the room and being consulted by an officer, whereupon the action take place off camera. The reviewer also stated that the production was admirably staged and acted.

The film is presumed lost because the film is not known to be held in any archive or by any collector.
