= Millarde =

Millarde is a surname. Notable people with the surname include:

- Harry F. Millarde (1885–1931), American actor and director
- June Millarde (1922–1991), American cover girl and actress known professionally as Toni Seven
