= Over the Hill to the Poorhouse =

1920 film

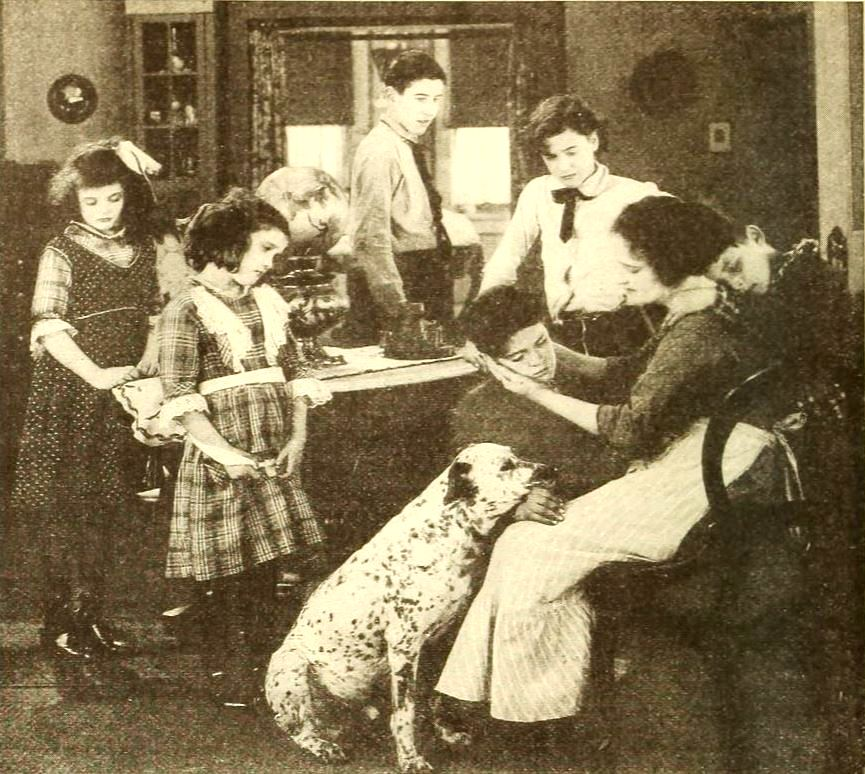
- Film still with Carr and her children
- Directed by: Harry Millarde
- Written by: Paul H. Sloane (scenario)
- Based on: poems "Over the Hill to the Poorhouse" and "Over the Hill from the Poorhouse" by Will Carleton
- Produced by: William Fox
- Starring: Mary Carr
- Cinematography: Hal Sintzenich; George Schneiderman
- Music by: Edgar Allen; Maurie Rubens; Lou Klein (lyrics)
- Distributed by: Fox Film Corporation
- Release date: September 17, 1920
- Running time: 11 reels
- Country: United States
- Language: Silent (English intertitles)
- Budget: $50,000
- Box office: $2.5 million

Over the Hill to the Poorhouse, also known as Over the Hill, is a 1920 American silent drama film about a woman who has a lot of children, and who never gets the chance to enjoy life. The film starred actress Mary Carr and almost all of her real-life children.

The film was directed by Harry Millarde, released by Fox Film Corporation, and was a box office success in 1920.

The story was previously filmed as Over the Hill to the Poorhouse (1908), starring Florence Auer. It was remade as Over the Hill (1931), starring Mae Marsh, and as Tears of a Mother (1937). The 1920 silent film is preserved at Bois d'Arcy in France.

The film cost $50,000 to make with an additional $200,000 in marketing.

== Plot ==
Selfless Ma Benton slaves for her six children in spite of her shiftless husband. It is the black sheep, John, who shines twenty years later when he saves his mother's pride by taking the blame for a crime his father committed. After leaving prison and making his fortune, John sends money for his mother to his brother, Isaac, who then steals it. Ma Benton is relegated to living in the poorhouse. Returning to punish Isaac, John restores the homestead and redeems himself.

== Cast ==
- Mary Carr as Ma Benton
- James Sheridan as Child Isaac (billed as Sheridan Tansey)
- Noel Tearle as Adult Isaac
- Stephen Carr as Child Thomas
- William Welsh as Pa Benton
- Jerry Devine as Child John
- Johnnie Walker as Adult John (billed as John Walker)
- James Sheldon as Child Charles
- Wallace Ray as Adult Charles
- Rosemary Carr as Child Rebecca
- Phyllis Diller as Adult Rebecca (this Phyllis Diller is not the TV comedian)
- Maybeth Carr as Child Susan
- Louella Carr as Adult Susan
- Vivienne Osborne as Isabella Strong
- Dorothy Allen as Agulitia
- Edna Murphy as Lucy
- Joseph Donohoe as Undetermined role
- John T. Dwyer as Adult Thomas

== See also ==
- List of Fox Film films
