= Blue-Eyed Mary =

Blue-Eyed Mary may refer to:

- Collinsia verna, or blue-eyed Mary, a winter annual native to eastern and central parts of North America
- Omphalodes verna or blue-eyed-Mary, an herbaceous perennial rhizomatous plant of the genus Omphalodes
- Blue-Eyed Mary (film), a lost 1918 silent film drama
