= Anne Austin =

Anne Austin may refer to:

- Ann Austin (n.d. – 1665), one of the first Quaker travelling preachers
- Anne Austin (writer) (1895 – ?), American writer of romance and mystery novels
