= The Heart of Romance =

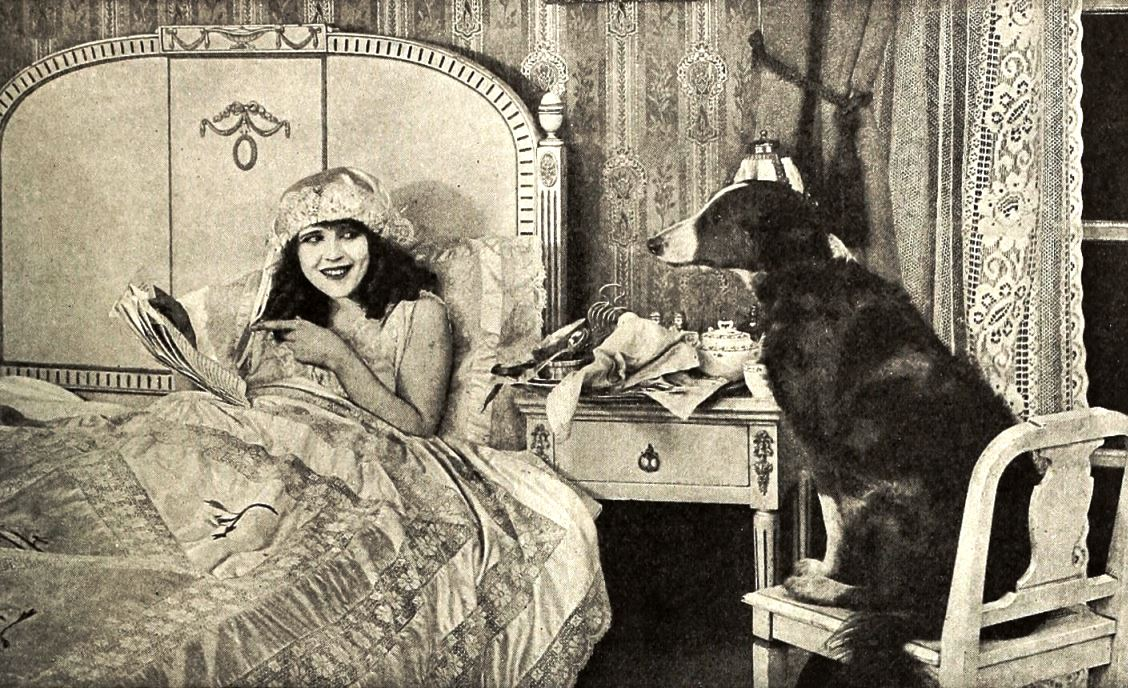
- June Caprice
- Directed by: Harry F. Millarde
- Written by: Adeline Leitzbach (scenario); Frances Crowley (screen story)
- Produced by: William Fox
- Starring: June Caprice
- Distributed by: Fox Film
- Release date: February 3, 1918
- Running time: 5 reels
- Country: USA
- Languages: Silent; English titles

The Heart of Romance is a lost 1918 silent film directed by Harry F. Millarde and starring his wife June Caprice. It was produced and released by the Fox Film Corporation.

== Cast ==
- June Caprice - Eloise Jackson
- Bernard Thornton - Harvey Greyson
- George Bunny - Judge Stafford
- Joseph Kilgour - Jerry Gray
- Lillian Paige - Mrs. Kibbie
- Jack Martin - Joe Bernheim
- John Raymond - Jack Dearborn
