= Over the Hill (1931 film) =

1931 film

- Theatrical release poster
- Directed by: Henry King
- Screenplay by: Tom Barry; Jules Furthman
- Based on: "Over the Hill to the Poorhouse" and "Over the Hill from the Poorhouse" (poems) by Will Carleton
- Starring: Mae Marsh; James Dunn; Sally Eilers; Olin Howland
- Cinematography: John F. Seitz
- Edited by: Frank E. Hull
- Music by: George Lipschultz
- Production company: Fox Film Corporation
- Distributed by: Fox Film Corporation
- Release date: November 29, 1931
- Running time: 89 minutes
- Country: United States
- Language: English
- Box office: $268,000

Over the Hill is a 1931 American Pre-Code black-and-white melodrama film directed by Henry King for Fox Film Corporation. Starring Mae Marsh, James Dunn, Sally Eilers, and Olin Howland, the story concerns a young mother who devotedly cares for her children but when they grow up, most of them turn their backs on her and she has no choice but to go live in the poorhouse. The film is a remake of the 1920 silent film Over the Hill to the Poorhouse, which had been a major box-office hit for Fox. The story was based on a pair of poems by Will Carleton. Over the Hill also inspired the South Korean film adaptation Over the Ridge (1968). The production marked Marsh's first sound film and the second pairing of Dunn and Eilers, who had achieved celebrity in Fox's Bad Girl released earlier in the year.

In 2019, the film was being digitally scanned for preservation by the Library of Congress's Silent Film Project.

== Plot ==
Morning in the Shelby house finds Ma trying to wake up her four children – Johnny, Thomas, Isaac, and Susan – and get them ready for school. The boys fight and kick each other as they dress, waking Pa, who irritably spanks Isaac. In school, Isaac is humiliated when the teacher, on whom he has a crush, finds a drawing of him on the blackboard kissing her. Though Thomas did it, Johnny is blamed, and Johnny later receives a whipping from his father; afterwards, he is comforted by his childhood friend Isabelle Potter. Isaac earns his parents' respect for memorizing the Ten Commandments and being an all-round good student. However, he is also seen stealing twenty-five cents from his parents' savings bank. Ma is seen working late at night doing sewing and ironing for other people, while Pa does not have a job; he assures her that he is still waiting for a government job that has been promised him.

Years later, the children, all grown up, come to visit their parents on Christmas Eve. Johnny comes with his long-time girlfriend Isabelle and announce their engagement. Susan arrives with her husband Ben, a butcher. Thomas comes alone, his wife Phyllis having decided to stay home. Isaac, who is more sanctimonious than ever, arrives last with his wife Minnie. After dinner, Pa goes out to meet some men for whom he will transport bootleg liquor. Johnny hears gunshots as he walks outside, sees Pa speeding past, and then finds Pa's car stuck in the snow. He insists that Pa go home and that he will take care of the car, but is arrested in possession of the liquor. Johnny is sentenced to three years in prison and tells Isabelle not to wait for him, but she remains close to Ma, who regularly visits Johnny in prison. Pa dreams about Johnny slaving away in the prison workshop and is overwrought with guilt; he decides to tell Ma that he is really to blame for the crime, but before he can say anything, he dies. Johnny is released a year early for good behavior and surprises Ma at home in an emotional reunion. He then decides to go work in Seattle and send Isaac money every month to support Ma until his return.

In Johnny's absence, Isaac encourages Ma to sell her house and go live with Thomas and Phyllis. Ma catches Phyllis sunbathing with her lover on the roof and her daughter-in-law insists that she leave. Ma then shuffles off to Susan and Ben, but Ben doesn't want her around. Though Isaac has the biggest house, his wife Minnie doesn't want Ma either. Isaac inquires as to Johnny's whereabouts and receives a letter from the Alaska Mining Corporation that Johnny's expedition team has been lost at the North Pole. He burns the letter, pockets the monthly check, and suggests to Ma that she would be more comfortable at the poorhouse. She sadly accepts her lot and checks herself in, where she is expected to work for her lodging.

Johnny returns home and is furious when he sees the house for sale and finds out that Isaac, rather than support Ma with the money he sent, allowed her to go to the poorhouse. He fights and kicks Isaac in his house and then drags him outside and down the street, threatening to drag him all the way to the poorhouse. Isabelle hears the commotion and intervenes, pulling Johnny away and comforting him. Johnny hops into his friend's carriage and drives to the poorhouse instead, where he finds Ma scrubbing floors. He kicks away her scrub bucket and carries her out as she tearfully tells everyone that her boy has returned, as she knew he would. In the final scene, Johnny and Isabelle have refurbished the house for their wedding the following day.

== Cast ==
=== Prologue ===
- Mae Marsh as Ma Shelby
- James Kirkwood, Sr. as Pa Shelby
- Joe Hachey as Isaac Shelby
- Tommy Conlon as Johnny Shelby
- Julius Molnar as Thomas Shelby
- Marilyn Harris as Susan Shelby
- Nancy Irish as Isabelle Potter

=== Children grown up ===
- Olin Howland as Isaac Shelby
- Eula Guy as Minnie
- James Dunn as Johnny Shelby
- Edward Crandall as Thomas Shelby
- Claire Maynard as Phyllis
- Joan Peers as Susan Shelby
- William Pawley as Ben Adams
- Sally Eilers as Isabelle Potter
- David Hartford as Bill Collector (uncredited)
- Douglas Walton as Stephen (uncredited)
- George H. Reed as Les (uncredited)

== Production ==
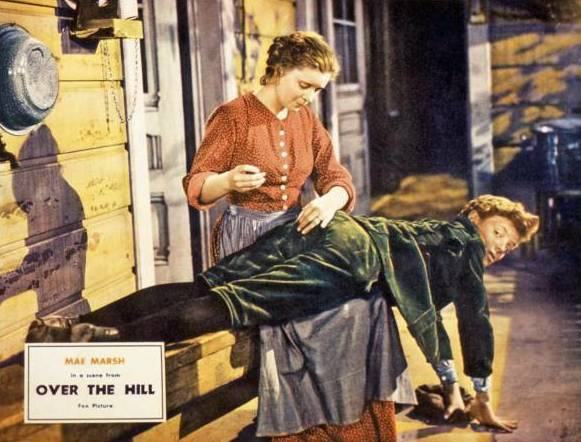
Mae Marsh as a young mother in the film

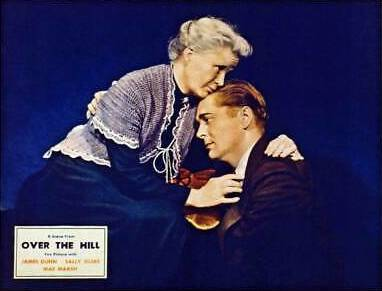
Marsh as an elderly woman with her grown-up son Johnny (James Dunn)

=== Development ===
Over the Hill is a remake of Over the Hill to the Poorhouse, a 1920 silent film which had been a major box-office hit for Fox. The original source for both films was the poems "Over the Hill to the Poorhouse" and "Over the Hill from the Poorhouse" by Will Carleton, published in 1873.

=== Casting ===
This was Mae Marsh's first sound film. Marsh, a silent-screen star, found it difficult to memorize dialogue. Director Henry King was quoted in Henry King, Director: From Silents to 'Scope (Directors Guild of America, 1995) as having encouraged Marsh to "speak like yourself", but Marsh said she wasn't about to study the script and begged him to "tell me what to say". Accordingly, King coached her on what to say before each scene, whether or not that dialogue was actually in the script. Marsh bleached her own hair white for her scenes as an elderly woman rather than don a wig.

The production marked the second film pairing of James Dunn and Sally Eilers, who had achieved celebrity in Bad Girl released earlier in 1931. Fox would re-team the popular pair in Dance Team (1932), Sailor's Luck (1933), and Hold Me Tight (1933).

Marilyn Harris, who plays Susan Shelby as a child, landed the part after making a favorable impression on the casting director at her interview; he agreed to change the age of the character to accommodate her.

=== Filming ===
Filming took place between early April and early May 1931. Additional production work took place from August 31 to mid-October 1931.

== Release ==
Over the Hill had its New York premiere during the week of November 20, 1931. It had its general release on November 29, 1931.

== Box office ==
The film ranked in the top five of Fox Film's box-office successes for 1931. With worldwide rentals totaling $1.1 million, the film yielded a gross profit of $268,000 (equivalent to $5,670,000 in 2025).

== Critical reception ==
Though the 1920 silent film had been a bigger box-office success, Variety and The New York Times praised the sound version over the silent one. Variety acknowledged that the silent film "was a furore in 1920, starting slowly and growing into a country-wide sensation," but contended that the sound film was "an infinitely better piece of work". The New York Times wrote that the sound version "is in most respects infinitely more restrained and certainly much better directed and photographed than its highly successful silent predecessor ... and it can boast also of performances that outshine any of those in the old mute work".

The New York Daily News gave the film 2 ½ stars, insisting that the plot, like that of the 1920 silent film, was unconvincing, writing: "Could a family of children be quite so cruel to such a hard-working, loving, sweet, patient, pretty little mother as the petite, white-haired lady of the Will Carleton poem, on which the picture is based? We don't believe it. We didn't then, and we don't now!" In a contemporary review, Leonard Maltin, who also gave the film 2 ½ stars, wrote: "This story was an old warhorse even in 1931, but by the time Mae Marsh utters the film's closing line it's hard not to shed a tear".

Mae Marsh was singled out for praise by many reviews. The Salt Lake Telegram asserted that "Mae is the picture". The Film Daily called hers "one of the outstanding performances of the year". The New York Times wrote: "Miss Marsh is always natural, and in spite of the nature of this story ... her characterization is really lifelike. In joy or woe, her acting is compelling and always subdued. She reveals the industry of the young mother and her pathetic plight as an aged and stooped old woman". McCaffrey and Jacobs asserted that Marsh, who had acted extensively in the silent era for D. W. Griffith and other filmmakers, showed herself to be "a sensitive and realistic performer in the sound medium". The Montreal Gazette, however, believed Marsh was "too young" to portray an elderly mother, and preferred her portrayal of a young mother in the first part of the film. A contemporary review by Magill's Cinema Annual 1983 calls the film "memorable for a superb performance by Mae Marsh".

James Dunn's performance also earned praise from critics. The New York Times said his was "an earnest and thoroughly sympathetic impersonation". The Montreal Gazette, which found the first half of the film depicting the children in their youth most interesting, stated that "the acting of the likeable James Dunn as the self-sacrificing hero, that is the main point of interest [in the second half]. Dunn is undoubtedly the screen's acquisition of this season".

The Film Daily complimented director Henry King for "making every scene in the picture live and breathe with humanness, and never overplaying his hand". Il Cinema Ritrovato notes some of the technical innovations that King brought to this early sound picture, writing:

He was never constrained by the [sound-recording] technology at all. Rather, in an act of experimentation, he made films with continual camera movements, achieving the most astounding results in Over the Hill, whose opening shots rank as some of King's most mythic images of country life. There are many memorable scenes in which camera movement and sound brilliantly complement each other. The sounds of the mother's sewing machine transition to the raucous sound of the prison workshop, where the image follows this sonic suggestion and superimposes the shots of the house and the prison, marking the breakdown of the guilt-ridden father. The carol Silent Night (heard over a shot of a church window) is mixed with the sound of sleigh-bells while the camera economically pans from the church to the frozen window of the family house, using a dissolve to enter the house through the window.

Similarly, Chung and Diffrient note that King touts the new sound technology for this Victorian-era story in the very first scene, showing dawn rising over the farmhouse to the accompaniment of roosters crowing loudly.

== Other adaptations ==
Over the Hills to the Poorhouse (1908), directed by Wallace McCutcheon, Over the Hills (1911), directed by John Smiley and George Loane Tucker, and Over the Hill to the Poorhouse (1920), directed by Harry Millarde, were also based on the Carleton poems "Over the Hill to the Poorhouse" and "Over the Hill from the Poorhouse".

The 1968 South Korean film Over the Ridge (Chŏ ŏndŏk nŏmŏsŏ), produced by Shin Sang-ok, features many of the same plot points as Over the Hill with the addition of narratives and references unique to Korean culture and its postwar drive for socioeconomic modernization. Chung and Diffrient assert that proof of Over the Ridge's status as a remake of the 1931 film rather than as an adaptation of the original Carleton poems is seen by their similar visual cues, such as the son kicking away his mother's scrub bucket as he rescues her from the poorhouse. These authors also choose to translate the Korean title as Over That Hill, explaining that the Korean film rejects the narrative of being "over the hill"—i.e. "on the downward slope to obsolescence"—in favor of expressing "an optimistic determination to surmount any obstacle on the path to national recovery", as if to say, "Hope lies just over that hill".

== Sources ==
- Chung, Hye Seung; Diffrient, David Scott (2015). Movie Migrations: Transnational Genre Flows and South Korean Cinema. Rutgers University Press. ISBN 9780813575186.
- Goble, Alan, ed. (2011). The Complete Index to Literary Sources in Film. Walter de Gruyter. ISBN 9783110951943.
- Magill, Frank N. (1983). Magill's Cinema Annual 1983. Gale / Cengage Learning. ISBN 9780893564025.
- Maltin, Leonard (2015). Turner Classic Movies Presents Leonard Maltin's Classic Movie Guide: From the Silent Era Through 1965: Third Edition. Penguin. ISBN 9780698197299.
- McCaffrey, Donald W.; Jacobs, Christopher P., eds. (1999). Guide to the Silent Years of American Cinema. Greenwood Publishing Group. ISBN 9780313303456.
- Parla, Paul; Mitchell, Charles P. (2000). Screen Sirens Scream!: Interviews with 20 Actresses from Science Fiction, Horror, Film Noir, and Mystery Movies, 1930s to 1960s. McFarland. ISBN 9780786407019.
- Sicherman, Barbara; Green, Carol Hurd, eds. (1980). Notable American Women: The Modern Period: a Biographical Dictionary. Harvard University Press. ISBN 9780674627338.
- Solomon, Aubrey (2014). The Fox Film Corporation, 1915-1935: A History and Filmography. McFarland. ISBN 9780786486106.
