= The Fight for Freedom =

1908 American silent film

- Directed by: possibly D. W. Griffith
- Produced by: American Mutoscope and Biograph Company
- Starring: Florence Auer; Arthur V. Johnson; Kate Bruce
- Cinematography: G. W. Bitzer and Arthur Marvin
- Distributed by: American Mutoscope and Biograph
- Release date: July 17, 1908
- Country: United States
- Languages: Silent; English intertitles

The Fight for Freedom is a 1908 American black-and-white short silent Western film which may have been directed by D. W. Griffith. Filmed in Shadyside, New Jersey, in June 1908, the film was released on July 17, 1908.

== Plot ==
The film opens in a town on the Mexican border. A poker game is going on in the local saloon. One of the players cheats and is shot dead by another of the players, a Mexican named Pedro. In the uproar that follows, Pedro is wounded as he escapes from the saloon. The sheriff tracks Pedro to his home but Pedro kills him too. Pedro's wife, Juanita, and his mother hide him so he can recover from his wounds. The posse arrives and Juanita is arrested on suspicion of murdering the sheriff. Pedro rescues her from the town jail and the two head for the Mexican border. Caught by the posse before they reach the border, Juanita is killed and Pedro is arrested and taken back to town.

== Cast ==
=== Leads ===
- Florence Auer as Juanita
- Arthur V. Johnson as Pedro
- Kate Bruce as Pedro's mother

=== Supporting ===
- John G. Adolfi
- Edward Dillon as posse member
- George Gebhardt as man in saloon / guard
- Wallace McCutcheon Jr.
- Anthony O'Sullivan as bartender
- Robert G. Vignola

== Attribution to D. W. Griffith ==
The film is said to have been directed by Griffith but the American Film Institute does not confirm this and queries it. The Fight for Freedom was released only three days after Griffith's first directorial film, The Adventures of Dollie and only three days before another film attributed to him, The Tavern Keeper's Daughter. While the American Mutoscope and Biograph Company was known for the fast production times of its films, it is possible that Griffith had a role in the production of this one but it was actually directed by someone else.

== See also ==
- D. W. Griffith filmography
- List of American films of 1908
