= The Love Cheat =

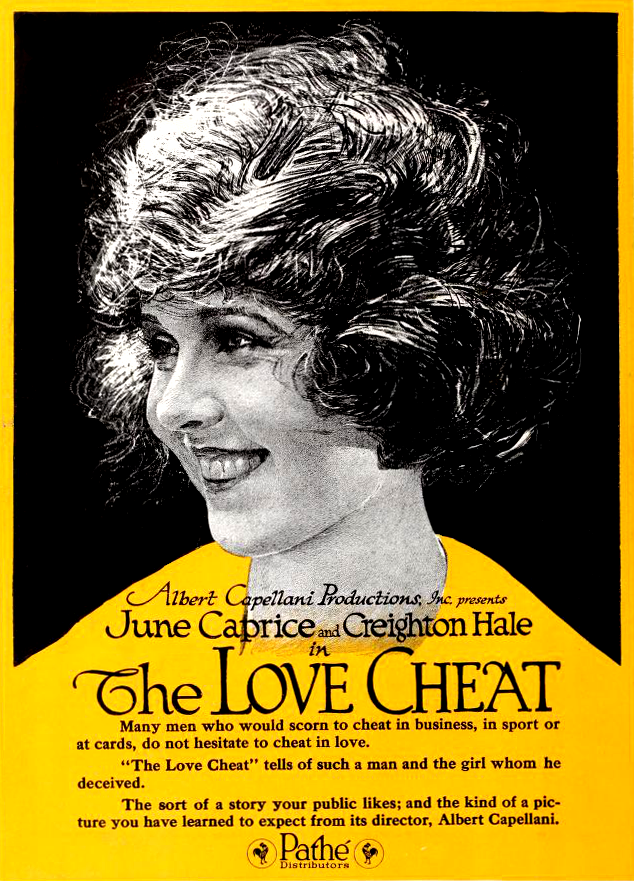
- Poster for the film
- Directed by: George Archainbaud
- Written by: Peggy McCall
- Based on: the play, Le Danseur Inconnu by Tristan Bernard
- Produced by: Albert Capellani
- Starring: June Caprice; Creighton Hale
- Cinematography: Lucien Tainguy
- Production companies: Albert Capellani Productions, Inc.
- Distributed by: Pathé Exchange
- Release date: August 24, 1919 (US)
- Running time: 5 reels
- Country: United States
- Language: English

The Love Cheat is a 1919 American silent film written by Peggy McCall and directed by George Archainbaud. It stars June Caprice and Creighton Hale.

== Plot ==
Henry Calving is a struggling artist in New York City. When a potential client asks to meet him at an upscale hotel, Calving borrows clothes from his friends so that he can look presentable. Wearing a suit, he arrives at the hotel only to find that his would-be client has already left. Despondent, he gets his coat from the checkroom and starts to head out. However, he realizes that he has been given the wrong coat. Checking the pockets, he finds an invitation to a party being held at the hotel. Feeling pangs of hunger, he decides to crash the party so that he can get something to eat. While there he satisfies his appetite, and then meets Louise Gordon, the daughter of the party's host, who is throwing the party for her. The two fall in love at first sight.

He does not tell Louise the truth, instead allowing her to believe him a member of the upper class. As he is leaving, he bumps into a former classmate, William West, who understands his predicament, and offers to loan him money in order for him to pursue Louise. Calving does indeed press his suit with Louise, eventually winning her agreement to marry. However, Louise's former fiancé, Herbert Rand, begins to bemoan the fact that he has lost her. West, who had been hoping to cash in off helping Calving, sees a better opportunity if he throws in with Rand, and shows him the IOU's Calving has given him, making it appear that Calving is scheming to get Louise to marry him so that he can get to her money.

On the eve of the engagement party, Calving has a crisis of conscience, and writes a note to Louise explaining his deception and apologizing for hurting her, and disappears. Louise reads his note, but believes in their love, and does not think that money should be a barrier. She tracks him down to where he is now working in a small curio shop. When they are reunited, they agree to marry.

== Cast list ==
- June Caprice as Louise Gordon
- Creighton Hale as Henry Calvin
- Edwards Davis as J. Stewart Gordon
- Alfred Hickman as Herbert Rand
- Charles Coleman as William West
- Jessica Brown as Dancer
- Katherine Johnson

== Production ==
This was the second film produced by Albert Capellani starring June Caprice and Creighton Hale. In July it was revealed that George Archainbaud would helm the picture, and the supporting cast was slated to include Edwards Davis, Alfred Hickman, Charles Coleman, and Katherine Johnson.

== Reception ==
The film was met with mixed reviews. Editor's Herald enjoyed the piece, comparing it to the prior work which starred Caprice and Hale, Oh, Boy!, released earlier that year. They felt it was a good light comedy, but was not the type of film which would elicit laughing out loud moments. They praised the production, direction, and photography of the movie. Motion Picture News felt that the film's plot was extremely thin, leading to the production having to have a lot of filler scenes added. However, they complimented the way in which Capellani handled adding that fluff. They also enjoyed Hale's performance, and while they felt that Caprice also did a good job, she could have done better. The felt that "Hickman's talents were wasted in a saccharine role." Finally, they felt the film relied too heavily on close-ups. Wid's Daily (which later became The Film Daily) similarly felt the plot was thin and incredibly predictable, as well as having too many close-ups, leading to an overall poor feeling on the direction in terms of moving the film forward, but had a positive overall artistic effect. They felt the cinematography was excellent with first rate camera-work. They were not overly impressed with the acting of the two leads, but felt the supporting cast was adequate.

== Preservation ==
With no holdings located in archives, The Love Cheat is considered a lost film.
