= Every Girl's Dream =

1917 film by Harry F. Millarde

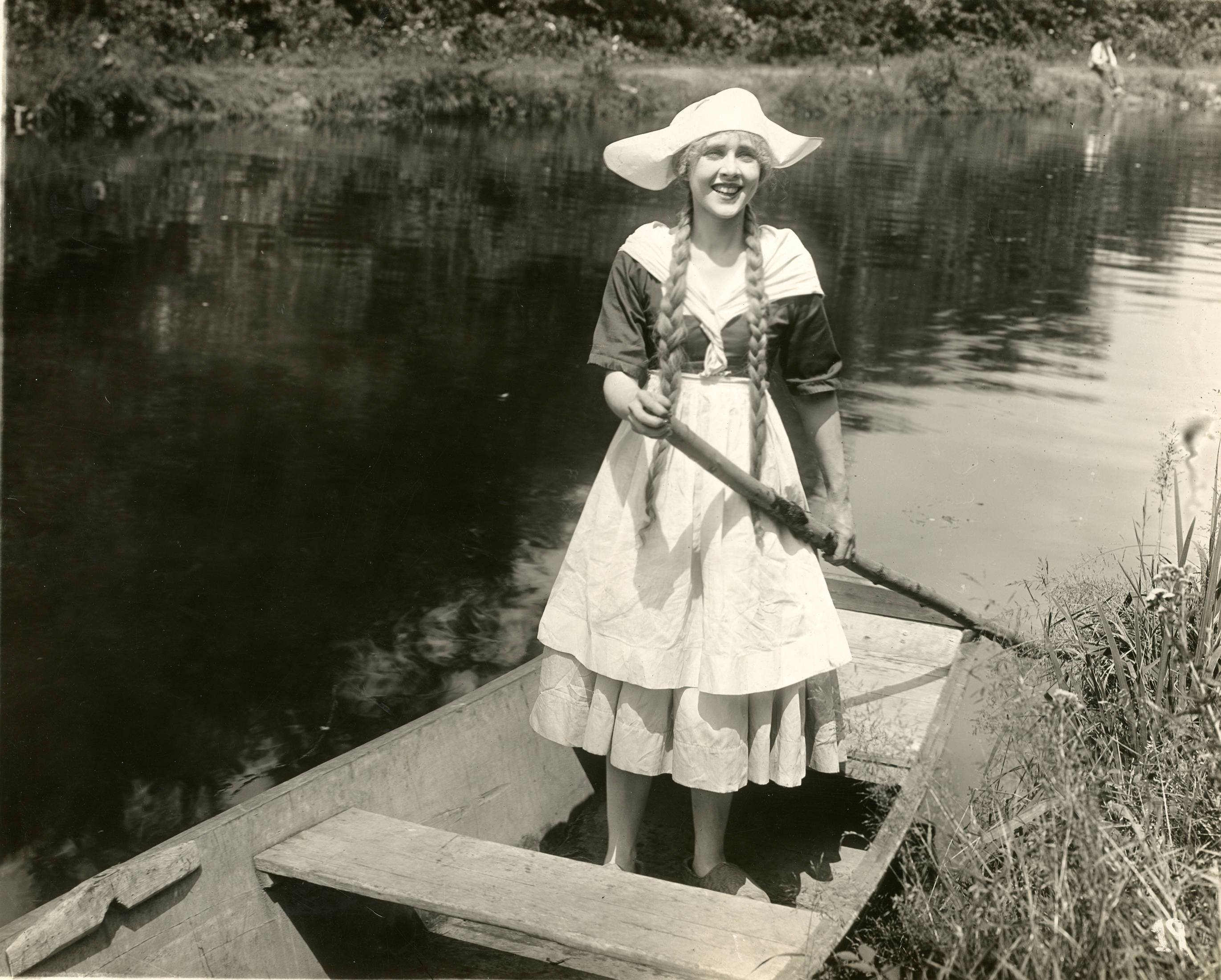
- Still with June Caprice
- Directed by: Harry F. Millarde
- Written by: Clifford Howard; Adrian Johnson
- Produced by: William Fox
- Starring: June Caprice; Kittens Reichert; Harry Hilliard
- Cinematography: David Wills
- Production company: Fox Film Corporation
- Distributed by: Fox Film Corporation
- Release date: August 27, 1917
- Running time: 60 minutes
- Country: United States
- Language: Silent (English intertitles)

Every Girl's Dream is a 1917 American silent drama film directed by Harry F. Millarde and starring June Caprice, Kittens Reichert, and Harry Hilliard.

== Cast ==
- June Caprice as Gretchen
- Kittens Reichert as Jane Cummings
- Harry Hilliard as Carl
- Margaret Fielding as Hulda
- Marcia Harris as Frau Van Lorn
- Dan Mason as Mynheer De Haas

== Preservation ==
With no prints of Every Girl's Dream located in any film archives, it is a lost film.

== Bibliography ==
- Solomon, Aubrey. The Fox Film Corporation, 1915-1935: A History and Filmography. McFarland, 2011.
