= The Siren's Reign =

- Directed by: Robert G. Vignola
- Starring: Alice Hollister; Harry F. Millarde; Anna Q. Nilsson; Robert Walker; Henry Hallam
- Distributed by: Kalem Company
- Release date: 2 April 1915
- Country: United States
- Language: Silent film

The Siren's Reign is a 1915 American silent drama film directed by Robert G. Vignola and starring Alice Hollister, Harry F. Millarde, Anna Q. Nilsson, Robert Walker and Henry Hallam. An upright young man marries a siren, a drunken, unfaithful woman, who mothers his child, and then ruins him financially and morally.

== Plot ==
Story of a man who disregards the quiet affection of a fine girl to marry a frivolous actress with whom he is infatuated. Several years later, after the woman has wrecked his life, the husband gives up in despair and shoots himself. Not until then does he realize the other woman's affection towards him. When he does he places his little daughter in her care.

== Themes ==
The characters played respectively by Alice Hollister and Anna Nelson are "contrasting roles (that) make for an interesting commentary on the changing role of women in the early 20th century."

== Cast ==
- Alice Hollister as Grace - a Soubrette
- Harry F. Millarde as Hugh Blake - The Husband
- Anna Q. Nilsson as Marguerite Morrison - The Other Woman
- Robert Walker as Morrison - Marguerite's Brother
- Henry Hallam as Hardy - a Faithful Employee
