= A Soldier's Oath =

1915 film

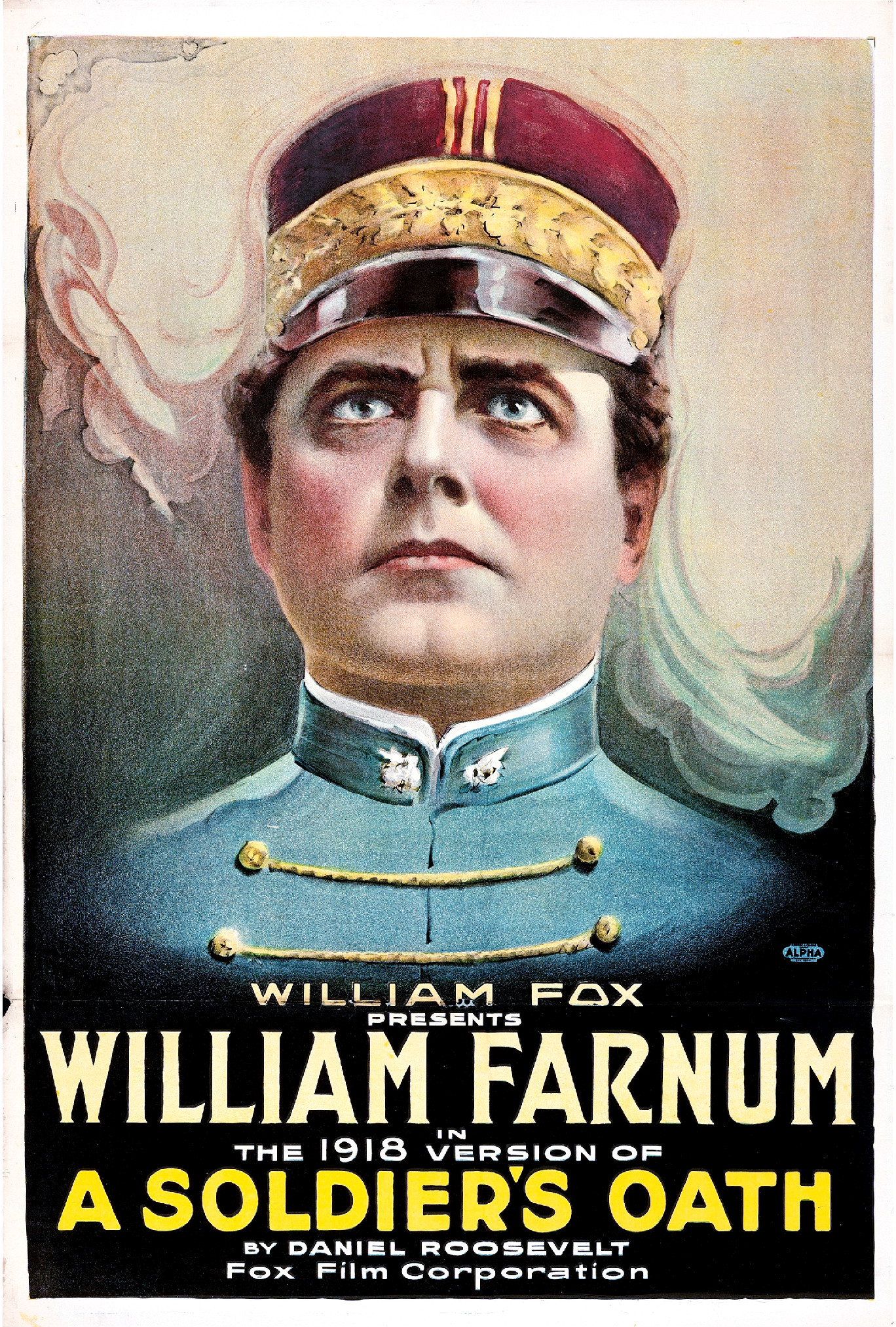
- Directed by: Oscar Apfel
- Written by: Oscar Apfel; Mary Murillo; Daniel Roosevelt (scenario)
- Produced by: William Fox
- Starring: William Farnum
- Distributed by: Fox Films
- Release dates: December 19, 1915 (United States); August 1918 (re-release)
- Running time: 5 or 6 reels
- Country: USA
- Language: Silent with English intertitles

A Soldier's Oath is a lost 1915 silent film drama directed by Oscar Apfel and starring William Farnum. It was produced by William Fox.

== Cast ==
- William Farnum - Pierre Duval
- Dorothy Bernard - Margot
- Kittens Reichert - Mavis Duval, at 5
- Alma Frederic - Mavis Duval, at 8
- Henry Herbert - Lazare (as H. J. Herbert)
- Walter Connolly - Raoul de Reyntiens
- Louise Thatcher - Duchess D'Auberg
- Benjamin Marburgh - Duke D'Auberg
- Henry A. Barrows - Count de Morave
- Will Lois - Jacques
- Louis V. Hart - Pere Crisset
- Louise Mackin - Sister Superior
- Ruth Findlay - (uncredited)

== See also ==
- List of Fox Film films
- 1937 Fox vault fire
