= Florence Auer =

American actress (1880–1962)

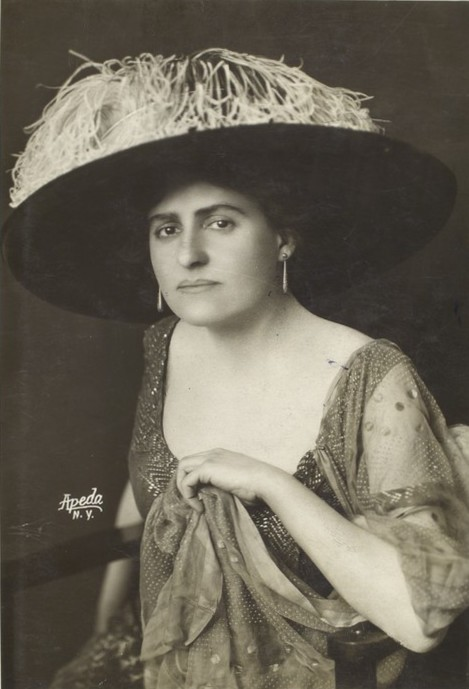
- Auer, c. 1911
- Born: March 3, 1880; Albany, New York, U.S.
- Died: May 14, 1962 (aged 82); New York City, U.S.
- Occupation: Actress
- Years active: 1907–1955

Florence Auer (March 3, 1880 – May 14, 1962) was an American theater and motion picture actress whose career spanned more than five decades.

== Life and career ==
Born in Albany, New York, Auer was educated at the American Academy of Dramatic Arts and the New England Conservatory of Music.

She began her career on East Coast stages at the turn of the 20th century. Her earliest known Broadway theatre performance was in a September 1907 production of The Ranger, produced by Charles Frohman at Wallack's Theatre. Auer was among Frohman's stock theatre company of fourteen actors who would be brought into Vitagraph Studios as their first stable of prominent film actors around 1907. She began appearing in films shortly thereafter; her first film appearance was in the 1908 Wallace McCutcheon Sr. directed comedy short The Sculptor's Nightmare opposite director D. W. Griffith. One of the original "Biograph Girls" (along with actresses Marion Leonard and Florence Lawrence), Auer would appear alongside such notable future directors as Griffith, Thomas H. Ince, Robert G. Vignola, Harry Solter and Mack Sennett in their early careers as actors. These early associations would help ensure Auer's longevity in films when the former actors became notable directors and often cast Auer in their later films.

During her early years as a motion picture actress, Auer would appear opposite such publicly popular actors of the early 20th century as: Florence Lawrence, Florence Turner, Maurice Costello, Owen Moore, Robert "Bobby" Harron and Julia Swayne Gordon.

Auer would appear in motion pictures until the 1950s, then transition to television before retiring. One of her last film appearances was in the 1951 comedy Love Nest, which starred a young Marilyn Monroe. Aside from acting, she also was a screenwriter for three early silent films: 1916's Edwin Carewe directed drama Her Great Price, starring Mabel Taliaferro; 1917's John G. Adolfi directed drama A Modern Cinderella, starring June Caprice; and 1921's Her Mad Bargain, directed by Edwin Carewe and starring Anita Stewart and Arthur Edmund Carewe.

She died in New York City, New York, in 1962 at the age of 82.

== Partial filmography ==
- The Fight for Freedom (1908, short) - Juanita
- The Kentuckian (1908, short)
- The Tavern Keeper's Daughter (1908, short) - Mother
- The Fatal Hour (1908, short)
- His Auto's Maiden Trip (1912, short)
- A Modern Cinderella (1917, writer)
- Fair Lady (1922) - Lucrezia
- The Heart of a Siren (1925) - Lisette
- The Beautiful City (1925) - Mamma Gillardi
- That Royle Girl (1925) - Baretta's Girl
- Seeing Things (1930)
- Beauty for Sale (1933) - Madame Sonia Customer (uncredited)
- I Married an Angel (1942) - Mrs. Roquefort (uncredited)
- Hangmen Also Die! (1943) - Czech Patriot (uncredited)
- Lady of Burlesque (1943) - Policewoman (uncredited)
- The North Star (1943) - Woman Farmer (uncredited)
- The Bridge of San Luis Rey (1944) - Palace Crow (uncredited)
- Abroad with Two Yanks (1944) - Dog's (Precious) Owner (uncredited)
- Youth on Trial (1945) - Maude McGregor (uncredited)
- Mama Loves Papa (1945) - Madame Dalba (uncredited)
- Adventure (1945) - Landlady
- Black Angel (1946) - Madame (uncredited)
- Gentleman Joe Palooka (1946) - Mrs. Archer (uncredited)
- Wife Wanted (1946) - Mrs. Rutheridge (uncredited)
- The Chase (1946) - Miss Connors (uncredited)
- It Happened on Fifth Avenue (1947) - Miss Parker (uncredited)
- Nightmare Alley (1947) - Jane (uncredited)
- The Bishop's Wife (1947) - Third Lady
- State of the Union (1948) - Grace Orval Draper
- Michael O'Halloran (1948) - Mrs. Jane Crawford
- Eight-Ball Andy (1948) - Mrs. Beasley
- The Loves of Carmen (1948) - Chestnut Seller (uncredited)
- Good Sam (1948) - Woman on Bus (uncredited)
- Knock on Any Door (1949) - Aunt Lena (uncredited)
- Bad Boy (1949) - Mrs. Meeham (uncredited)
- Big Jack (1949) - Homely Woman (uncredited)
- Hold That Baby! (1949) - Hope Andrews
- Madame Bovary (1949) - Mme. Petree (uncredited)
- That Forsyte Woman (1949) - Ann Forsyte Heyman
- Bride for Sale (1949) - Eloise Jonathan (uncredited)
- Blonde Dynamite (1950) - First Dowager
- It's a Small World (1950) - Grotesque Cafe Dowager (uncredited)
- Love Nest (1951) - Mrs. Braddock (uncredited)
- Boots Malone (1952) - Woman at Auction (uncredited)
- Love Is Better Than Ever (1952) - Madame Secretary (uncredited)
- The Star (1952) - Annie's Friend in Store (uncredited)
- Silver Lode (1954) - Mrs. Elmwood
- Lucy Gallant (1955) - Woman at Sale (uncredited)
- Top Gun (1955) - Mrs. Turner (uncredited)
