= A Wicked Woman =

1934 film by Charles Brabin

- Directed by: Charles Brabin
- Written by: Florence Ryerson; Zelda Sears
- Based on: Wicked Woman; 1933 novel by Anne Austin
- Produced by: Harry Rapf
- Starring: Mady Christians; Jean Parker; Charles Bickford; Marilyn Harris
- Cinematography: Lester White
- Edited by: Ben Lewis
- Music by: Score: William Axt; Songs: Burton Lane (music); Harold Adamson (lyrics)
- Production company: Metro-Goldwyn-Mayer
- Distributed by: Metro-Goldwyn-Mayer
- Release date: December 7, 1934
- Running time: 72 minutes
- Country: United States
- Language: English
- Budget: $378,000
- Box office: $333,000

A Wicked Woman is a 1934 drama film directed by Charles Brabin and starring Mady Christians as a woman who kills her abusive husband to protect her family and builds a new life to raise their four children. The film also stars Jean Parker and Charles Bickford. It was based on the novel Wicked Woman by Anne Austin.

== Cast ==
- Mady Christians as Naomi Trice, aka Naomi Stroud
- Jean Parker as Rosanne
- Charles Bickford as Naylor, the man who wins Naomi's love
- Betty Furness as Yancey
- William Henry as Curtis
- Jackie Searl as Curtis as a Child (credited as Jackie Searle)
- Betty Jane Graham as Yancey as a Child
- Marilyn Harris as Rosanne as a Child
- Paul Harvey as Ed Trice
- Zelda Sears as Gram Teague
- Robert Taylor as Bill Renton
- Sterling Holloway as Peter
- Georgie Billings as Neddie
- DeWitt Jennings as Sheriff

== Box office ==
According to MGM records the film earned $206,000 in the US and Canada and $127,000 elsewhere, resulting in a loss of $181,000.
