= A Modern Cinderella =

1917 film by John G. Adolfi

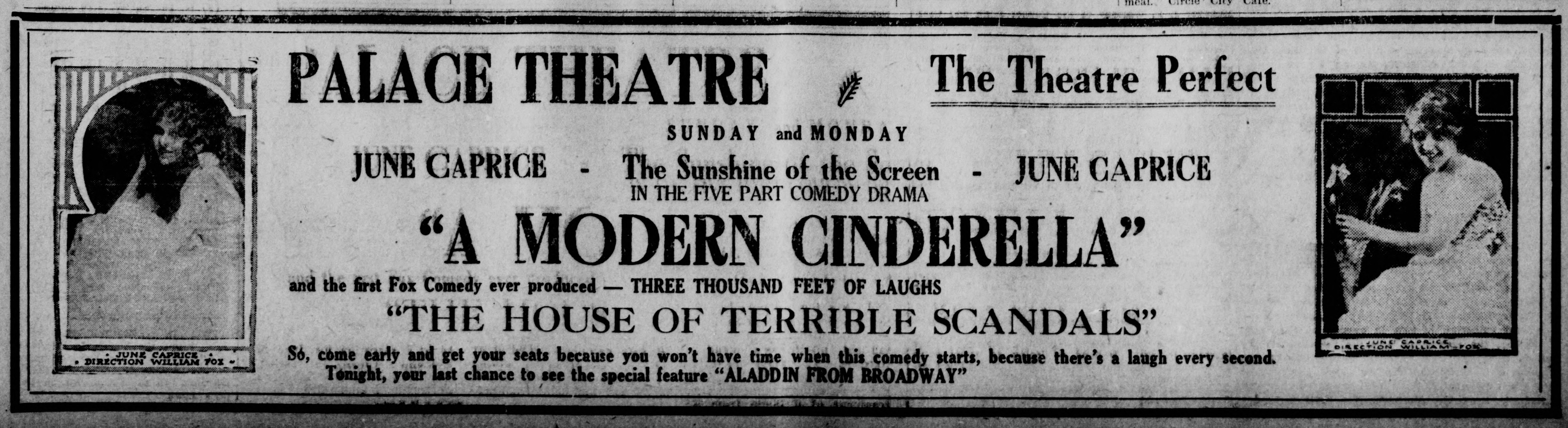
- Newspaper advertisement
- Directed by: John G. Adolfi
- Written by: Florence Auer
- Produced by: William Fox
- Starring: June Caprice; Frank Morgan; Betty Prendergast
- Cinematography: Rial B. Schellinger
- Production company: Fox Film Corporation
- Distributed by: Fox Film Corporation
- Release date: January 8, 1917
- Running time: 50 minutes
- Country: United States
- Languages: Silent; English intertitles

A Modern Cinderella is a lost 1917 American silent drama film directed by John G. Adolfi and starring June Caprice, Frank Morgan and Betty Prendergast.

== Cast ==
- June Caprice as Joyce
- Frank Morgan as Tom
- Betty Prendergast as Polly
- Stanhope Wheatcroft as Harry
- Grace Stevens as Mother
- Tom Brooke as Father

== Preservation ==
With no holdings located in archives, A Modern Cinderella is considered a lost film.

== Bibliography ==
- Solomon, Aubrey. The Fox Film Corporation, 1915-1935: A History and Filmography. McFarland, 2011.
