= So's Your Old Man =

1926 film by Gregory La Cava

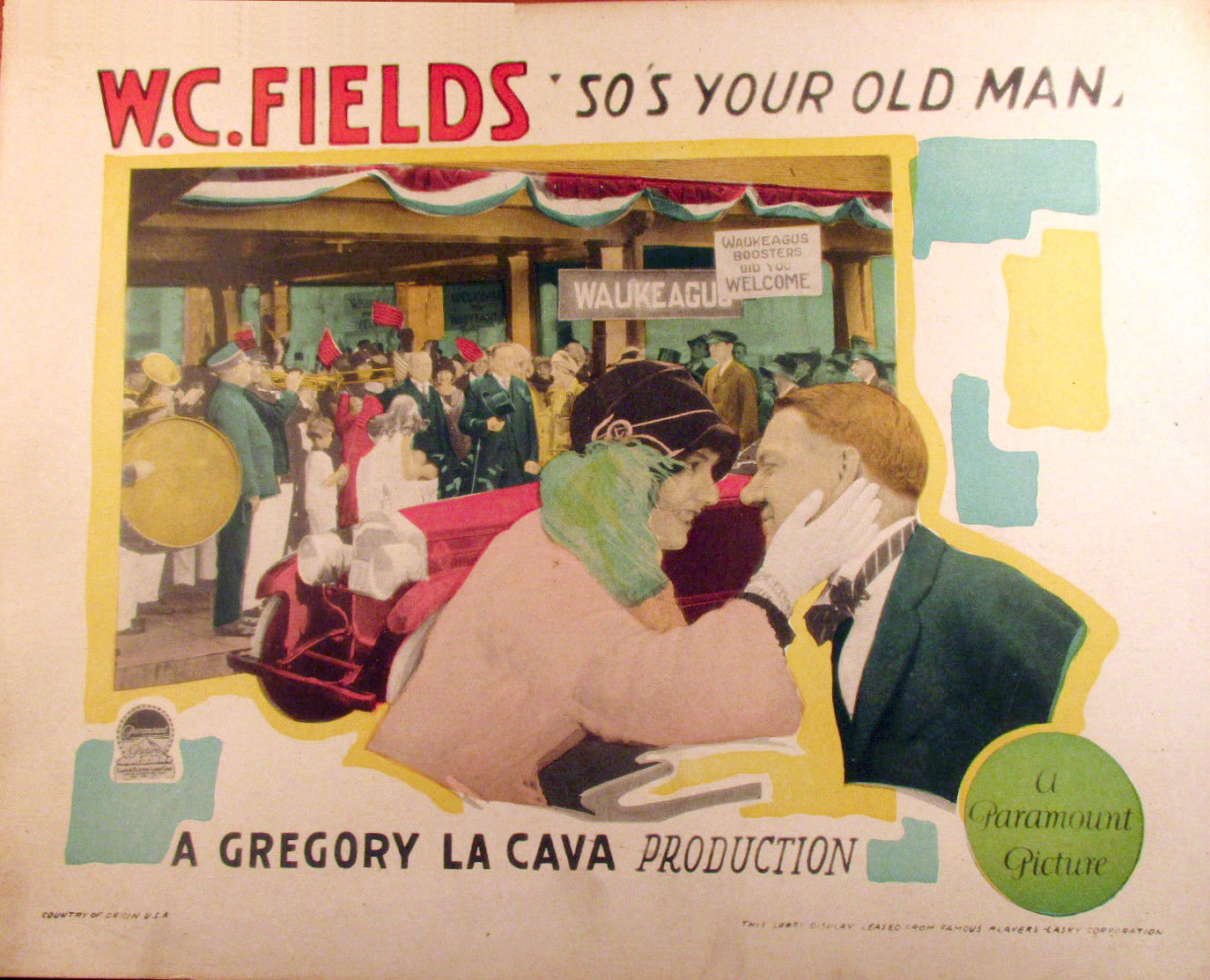
- Lobby card
- Directed by: Gregory La Cava
- Written by: Howard Emmett Rogers (adaptation); J Clarkson Miller (screenplay); Julian Johnson (titles)
- Based on: Mr. Bisbee's Princess by Julian Leonard Street
- Produced by: Adolph Zukor; Jesse Lasky
- Starring: W. C. Fields; Alice Joyce
- Cinematography: George Webber
- Edited by: George Block; Julian Johnson
- Distributed by: Paramount Pictures
- Release date: October 25, 1926
- Running time: 67 minutes
- Country: United States
- Language: Silent (English intertitles)

So's Your Old Man is a 1926 American silent comedy film directed by Gregory La Cava and starring W. C. Fields and Alice Joyce. It was written by J. Clarkson Miller based on the story "Mr. Bisbee's Princess" by Julian Leonard Street as adapted by Howard Emmett Rogers. It was filmed at Astoria Studios in Queens, New York City.

The film was remade as a talkie in 1934, with W. C. Fields again starring, under the title You're Telling Me!. In 2008, So's Your Old Man was selected for preservation in the United States National Film Registry by the Library of Congress.

== Plot ==
So's Your Old Man (1926)

Sam Bisbee is a small-town glazier who's always trying to get rich quick, and his schemes are driving his wife crazy. When he invents an unbreakable glass windshield, his attempt to demonstrate it at a convention of automobile manufacturers is ruined when his car gets switched with another, and instead of bouncing off, the brick he throws at it smashes the windshield to pieces. On the train ride home, Bisbee considers suicide, but instead rescues a young woman who he believes is trying to kill herself. It turns out the woman is really Princess Lescaboura, and their friendship brings social success to the Bisbees.

== Cast ==
- W. C. Fields as Samuel Bisbee
- Alice Joyce as Princess Lescaboura
- Charles "Buddy" Rogers as Kenneth Murchison
- Kittens Reichert as Alice Bisbee (credited as Catherine Reichert)
- Marcia Harris as Mrs. Bisbee, wife of Sam
- Julia Ralph as Mrs. A. Brandewyne Murchison
- Frank Montgomery as Jeff, a fellow scientist
- Jerry Sinclair as Al
- Frederick Burton as Senator (uncredited)
- Charles Byer as Prince Lescaboura (uncredited)
- Walter Walker as Mayor of Waukeagus (uncredited)
