= Kittens Reichert =

American actress

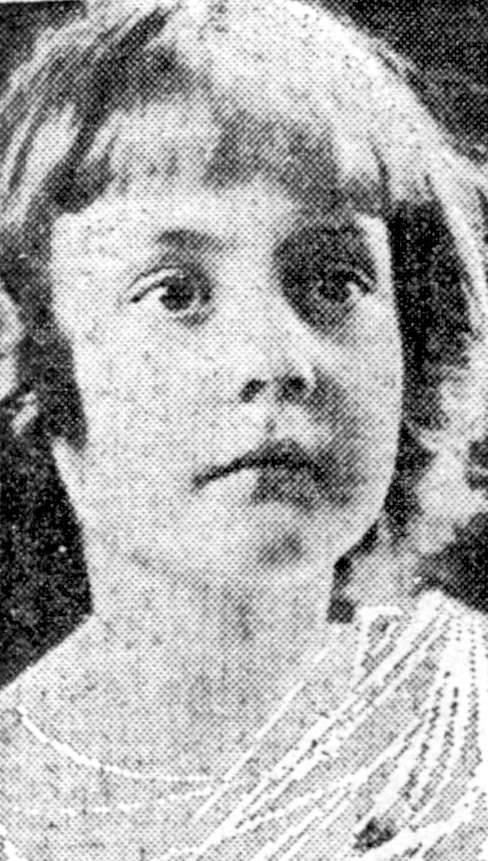
- In 1916, age 6.
- Born: Catherine Alma Reichert; March 3, 1910; Yonkers, New York
- Died: January 11, 1990 (aged 79); Louisville, Kentucky
- Other name: Kittens
- Occupation: Actress
- Years active: 1914 - 1926

Kittens Reichert (March 3, 1910 – January 11, 1990) was an American child actress in silent films.

== Biography ==
The daughter of Mr. and Mrs. George C. Reichert, she was born Catherine Alma Reichert in Yonkers, New York, but was nicknamed "Kittens", which she adopted as her stage name.

When she was 2 years old, Reichert was a stand-in for a film that was being made in Yonkers. Beginning in 1914, she played supporting juvenile roles to many of filmdom's biggest stars, including Theda Bara, Pauline Frederick and William Farnum. Her career effectively ended when she was 9 in 1919 because her family did not want to move out to California, where the film industry had shifted, though she did make a further appearance in So's Your Old Man (1926), starring W. C. Fields.

In 1927, Reichert portrayed Hope Toombs in a Fiske O'Hara Players production of The Circus Girl at the New Warburton Theatre in Yonkers.

Reichert died in Louisville, Kentucky on January 11, 1990, at the age of 79.

== Selected filmography ==
- The Eternal City (1915)
- A Soldier's Oath (1915)
- The Eternal Sapho (1916)
- The Great Problem (1916)
- The Fool's Revenge (1916)
- Ambition (1916)
- The Primitive Call (1917)
- Every Girl's Dream (1917)
- So's Your Old Man (1926)
