= The Fatal Hour (1908 film) =

1908 film directed by D. W. Griffith

- Directed by: D. W. Griffith
- Written by: D. W. Griffith
- Produced by: Edwin S. Porter
- Starring: George Gebhardt
- Cinematography: Arthur Marvin
- Release date: August 18, 1908
- Running time: 14 minutes (one reel)
- Country: United States
- Language: Silent

The Fatal Hour is a 1908 American silent short crime film directed by D. W. Griffith.

== Cast ==
- George Gebhardt as Hendricks
- Harry Solter as Pong Lee
- Linda Arvidson as Kidnapped Woman
- Florence Auer
- Charles Gorman
- D. W. Griffith as Policeman
- Marion Leonard
- Jeanie MacPherson
- Anthony O'Sullivan as Chinese Driver
- Mack Sennett as Policeman
