= Eight-Ball Andy =

1948 film

Eight-Ball Andy is an American comedy short released by Columbia Pictures on March 11, 1948. It stars Andy Clyde, Dick Wessel, Maude Prickett, Florence Auer, and Vernon Dent.

== Plot ==
Andy and his wife, Ruthie (Prickett) are busy moving into their new apartment. The cause of this was Andy's brother-in-law Claude Beasley (Wessel) who was learning to play the trombone in all hours of the night that the landlord kicked all of them out of their old one. Also living with them is Ruth's mother Mrs. Beasley (Auer), who strongly despises Andy. Thinking that Claude is away living at another apartment, Andy discovers that Claude has returned and plans to invent a state-of-the-art termite spray.

Later on, Claude tries out the formula by dumping a jar of termites onto a wooden plank that Andy was using to reach the ceiling while painting it. The spray, however, causes the plank to melt in half and Andy crashes to the floor. While Claude is out of the room, Andy substitutes the broken plank for a new one. Claude comes back in, looks at the plank, not knowing it was replaced, and thinking that the spray worked, he happily decides to try to sell the formula to Andy's boss Mr. Bradshaw (Dent) when hey invite him over to dinner, which Andy is strongly against.

At dinner, several things go wrong, Bradshaw impacts a couple breakaway chairs, with the second one causes a jar of termites to fall and crawl all over Mr. Bradshaw clothes. Angry, Andy tosses way the termite spray, causing it to melt the floor. He discovers that he used the table to spray for termites, which collapses. Enraged, Andy walks towards the kitchen, but falls through the floor and to the downstairs apartment, fainting a lady ironing her dress, as her jealous husband, in the middle of his daily shave, chases Andy out of the apartment. Soon after, Claude and Bradshaw accidentally fall down into the same apartment and both get beaten to a pulp by the jealous husband. When they re-enter Andy's apartment, Bradshaw angrily informs him to get rid of Claude or be fired, Andy jumps at the chance and orders Claude and Mrs. Beasley out of the apartment. Before leaving, Claude tells Andy he invented a new gasoline and tried it out on his mother's car, which explodes and Mrs. Beasley physically scolds Claude off-screen. Soon after, Andy discovers that the Chicken is still in the oven. But, he falls back into the downstairs apartment.

== Cast ==
- Andy Clyde as Andy
- Dick Wessel as Claude Beasley
- Maudie Prickett as Ruth Clyde
- Florence Auer as Mrs. Beasley
- Vernon Dent as Mr. Bradshaw (uncredited)
- Ralph Volkie as Wilbur, Jealous Husband (uncredited)

== Notes ==
This was remade in 1956 as Andy Goes Wild. Producer/director Jules White had brought in Wessel and Prickett to film new footage.
