= Maudie Prickett =

American actress (1914–1976)

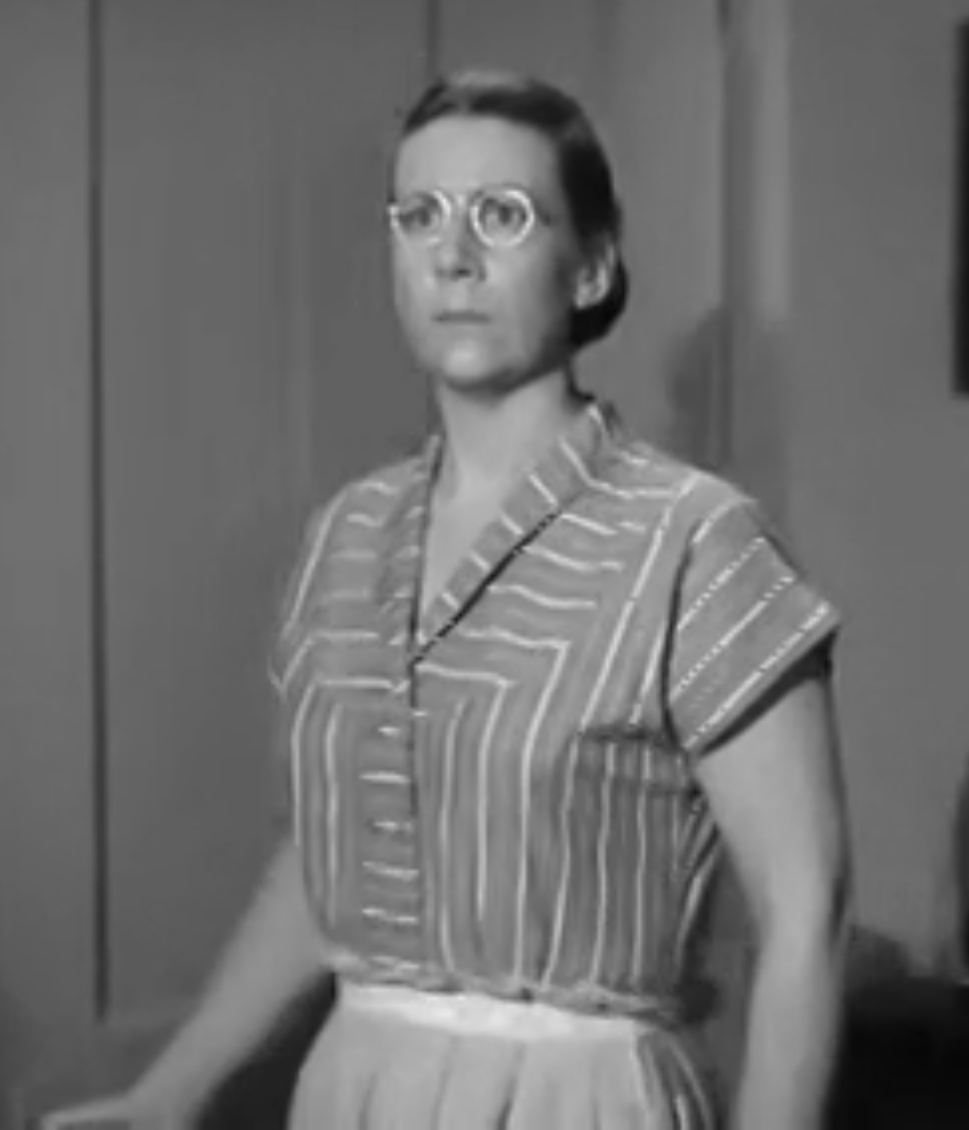
- Prickett in TV's The Public Defender, episode "Circumstantial Evidence" (1954)
- Born: Maudie Marie Doyle; October 25, 1914; Portland, Oregon, U.S.
- Died: April 14, 1976 (aged 61); Pasadena, California, U.S.
- Resting place: Mountain View Cemetery, Oakland, California
- Other names: Maud Prickett; Maude Prickett
- Occupation: Actress
- Years active: 1938–1974
- Spouses: Charles Fillmore Prickett II (m. 1941; died 1954) Eakle W. Cartwright (m. 1961; died 1962) Cyril Bernard Cooper (m. 1966; died 1971)
- Children: 2

Maudie Prickett (born Maudie Marie Doyle; October 25, 1914 – April 14, 1976) was an American character actress who performed in over 300 stage, film, and television productions during a career that spanned nearly four decades.

== Career ==
Born in Portland, Oregon, Prickett often portrayed maids, aunts, secretaries, spinsters, busybodies, and nosy neighbors. She made 36 appearances on the television sitcom Hazel starring Shirley Booth as the title character's friend; Hazel and Rosie were maids in neighboring homes.

Prickett played a cook named Elvira in Harvey (1950) and a maid named Elsie in Alfred Hitchcock's North by Northwest (1959). She also appeared in the 1950s Western series The Adventures of Kit Carson and 26 Men. She played "Miss Tazey", Lois Lane's old nurse, in a 1952 episode of the Adventures of Superman.

She made nine appearances as Ms. Gordon on CBS's The Jack Benny Program. She played Miss Sanders, a secretary to Howard McNear's character Wilbur Wilgus, on a 1959 episode of the ABC sitcom The Donna Reed Show. She portrayed Alice MacAvity in a 1954 installment of the NBC sitcom It's a Great Life. She guest-starred in the 1957-1958 NBC sitcom Sally, in a 1958 episode of the NBC anthology series Colgate Theatre, and on CBS's Dennis the Menace. She appeared as a dentist's secretary in the episode "The Dentist" on another CBS sitcom, Angel. She played Mrs. Bennett in the 1958 episode "Beaver and Poncho" of Leave it to Beaver. Prickett was in the 1962 short-lived ABC/Warner Bros. sitcom Room for One More and played a regular character on another short-lived series of the 1960s, The Tammy Grimes Show.

Prickett also appeared in several episodes of The Andy Griffith Show as, variously, Mrs. Edna Larch and Aunt Nora, as well as in the role of Myrtle on Mayberry R.F.D. She appeared twice on Get Smart; once playing Maxwell Smart's Aunt Bertha (in the 1965 episode, "My Nephew the Spy"). She played a DMV clerk on a 1969 episode of The Mod Squad. She played a landlady on a 1970 episode of the police drama Dragnet, and various characters in five episodes of the sitcom Bewitched. Her final television performances were 1974 roles as Mabel on the CBS series Dirty Sally and as Mrs. Chandler on McMillan & Wife.

== Personal life ==
Maudie was married three times; all three of her husbands predeceased her. Her first marriage was in 1941 to Charles Fillmore Prickett II (1901–1954), the co-founder and general manager of the Pasadena Playhouse, with whom she had two children: Charles Fillmore Prickett III (1949–2006), who became an orthopedic surgeon, and a daughter, Mrs. Charie Laugharn (b. 1950).

In 1961, seven years after the death of her first husband, she married Dr. Eakle W. Cartwright, a physician, who died the following year. Her final marriage was to Cyril Bernard Cooper (1900–1971), who served as mayor of Pasadena from 1968 to 1970.

== Death ==
In 1976, at age 61, Prickett died of uremic poisoning in Pasadena, California. She is interred at Mountain View Cemetery and Mausoleum in Altadena, California.

== Selected filmography ==
- Gold Mine in the Sky (1938) - Customer (uncredited)
- Go West, Young Lady (1941) - Townswoman (uncredited)
- Two-Fisted Stranger (1946) - Widow Simpson (uncredited)
- The Fighting Frontiersman (1946) - Kate the Barber (uncredited)
- Boston Blackie and the Law (1946) - Miss Burton, Librarian (uncredited)
- The Lone Hand Texan (1947) - Hattie Hatfield (uncredited)
- Time Out of Mind (1947) - Annie
- Messenger of Peace (1947) - Matty Frommel
- Song of Idaho (1948) - Millie (uncredited)
- Eight-Ball Andy (1948) - Ruth Clyde
- Whirlwind Raiders (1948) - Mrs. Wallace (uncredited)
- Whiplash (1948) - Mrs. Gruman (uncredited)
- One Sunday Afternoon (1948) - Woman Barber (uncredited)
- The Fighting O'Flynn (1949) - Wife (uncredited)
- Lust for Gold (1949) - Wife (uncredited)
- Colorado Territory (1949) - Mrs. Wallace (uncredited)
- Mr. Soft Touch (1949) - Ugly Old Maid Tenant (uncredited)
- The Cowboy and the Indians (1949) - Ms. Summers (uncredited)
- Abandoned (1949) - Nurse Ferris (uncredited)
- The Inspector General (1949) - Townwoman (uncredited)
- Montana (1950) - Rancher's Wife (uncredited)
- No Sad Songs for Me (1950) - Anna, Woman at Train Depot (uncredited)
- Beyond the Purple Hills (1950) - Agnes (uncredited)
- No Way Out (1950) - Woman (uncredited)
- Between Midnight and Dawn (1950) - Nagging Wife (uncredited)
- Harvey (1950) - Elvira—Cook (uncredited)
- Her First Romance (1951) - Miss Pond - Schoolteacher
- The Model and the Marriage Broker (1951) - Delia Seaton (uncredited)
- Pecos River (1951) - Stage Passenger (uncredited)
- Belles on Their Toes (1952) - Lady with Fan (uncredited)
- Wait till the Sun Shines, Nellie (1952) - Mrs. Burdge (uncredited)
- Lost in Alaska (1952) - Woman in Window (uncredited)
- Monkey Business (1952) - Clerk (uncredited)
- Something for the Birds (1952) - Woman with Vacuum Cleaner (uncredited)
- Everything I Have Is Yours (1952) - Ella (uncredited)
- Million Dollar Mermaid (1952) - Grace - Nurse / Receptionist (uncredited)
- Stars and Stripes Forever (1952) - Thelma - Sousa's Maid (uncredited)
- Man in the Dark (1953) - Nurse Receptionist (uncredited)
- Scandal at Scourie (1953) - Mrs. Holahan (uncredited)
- Hannah Lee: An American Primitive (1953) - Mrs. Miller (uncredited)
- No Escape (1953) - Bookstore Clerk
- City of Bad Men (1953) - Indignant Townswoman (uncredited)
- Hot News (1953) - Screaming Woman (uncredited)
- Gun Fury (1953) - Mrs. Rogers (uncredited)
- Wyoming Renegades (1954) - Mrs. Argyle (uncredited)
- Woman's World (1954) - Mother (uncredited)
- Deep in My Heart (1954) - Lodge Manager (uncredited)
- A Man Called Peter (1955) - Mrs. Pike (uncredited)
- Man with the Gun (1955) - Mrs. Elderhorn (uncredited)
- Good Morning, Miss Dove (1955) - Miss Rice (uncredited)
- Navy Wife (1956) - Nurse (uncredited)
- The Phantom Stagecoach (1957) - Mrs. Wiggins
- Kiss Them for Me (1957) - Chief Nurse (uncredited)
- Thundering Jets (1958) - Mrs. Blocher
- The Legend of Tom Dooley (1959) - 2nd Old Maid (uncredited)
- North by Northwest (1959) - Elsie, the maid (uncredited)
- The Big Fisherman (1959) - Perturbed Mother (uncredited)
- The Absent Minded Professor (1961) - Woman in Street Interviewee (uncredited)
- Joy in the Morning (1965) - Saleslady (uncredited)
- I'll Take Sweden (1965) - Spinster
- The Gnome-Mobile (1967) - Katie Barrett
- With Six You Get Eggroll (1968) - Party Guest (uncredited)
- Sweet Charity (1969) - Nurse on Bridge (uncredited)
- Rascal (1969) - Miss Pince-nez (uncredited)
- The Maltese Bippy (1969) - Mrs. Potter
