= Henry Hallam (actor) =

British-born stage and silent film actor in America

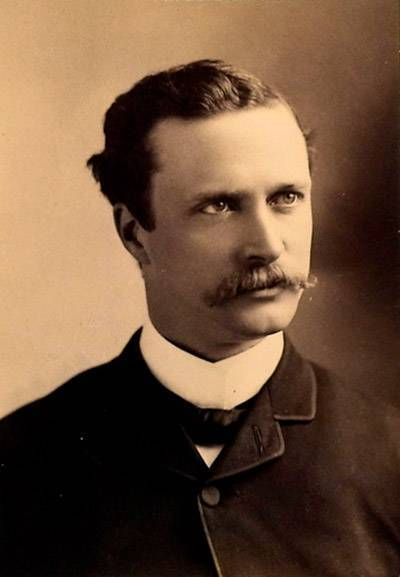
Henry Hallam c. 1875

Henry Hallam (August 7, 1850 – November 11, 1921) was a British-born operatic tenor and early film actor who began his five decade career singing on stage in England and then Australia and on tour in Australasia and India. He later appeared in silent films in the United States.

== Early career ==
He was born as Henry Samuel Hallam Mayer in Clerkenwell in London in 1850, one of four children born to Elizabeth née Williams and Martin Mayer, a furrier of 8 Greystoke Place, Fetter Lane. He studied singing with Joseph Robinson in Liverpool before commencing a professional career as a teenage burlesque performer. After a brief time in London Hallam sailed to Melbourne in Australia where from 1870 to 1872 he embarked on a successful singing career touring with the Royal English Opera Company, on one occasion being described as 'a young gentleman with a very pretty, very light tenor voice, extremely smooth and pleasing to the ear’. During this period he appeared with Alice May, Armes Beaumont and Fanny Simonsen, among others. His first operatic role was in 1871 when he sang Tonio in an act of The Daughter of the Regiment before singing in The Messiah in Melbourne at Christmas 1871.

== Australasia ==
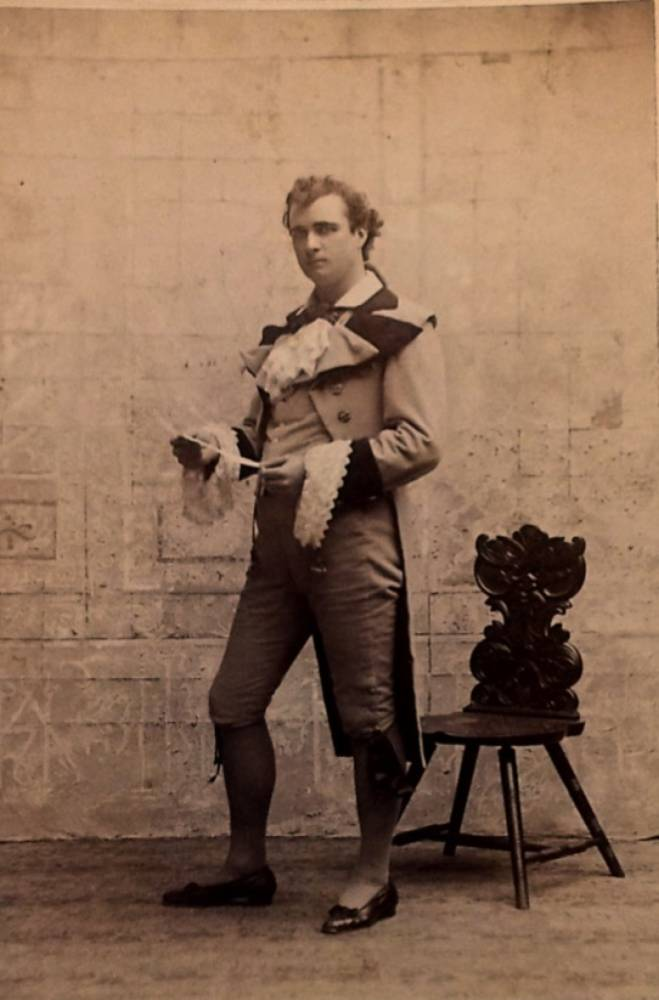
Hallam in costume

In 1872 Hallam joined the Simonsen opera company for whom he sang Fritz in The Grande-Duchesse of Gérolstein and Manuel in The Rose of Castille. He appeared in 'Operatic Concerts' in Sydney before joining the music hall performer Harry Rickards with whom he toured Australia and New Zealand, singing ballads between Rickards' comic turns. In 1873 Hallam left Rickards and tried his hand at stockbroking but on losing all his money he returned to what he knew best - singing and performing, to which he added teaching. He appeared with the Alice May Opera Company and in November 1873 married the Launceston-born actress Mary Harriet Langmaid (1846–1874), who was a popular performer on stage in Sydney as 'Hattie Shepparde'.

From late 1873 with the Alice May Opera Company Hallam sang the lead tenor roles in The Bohemian Girl, La Sonnambula, The Grande-Duchesse of Gérolstein, The Daughter of the Regiment, Maritana and Geneviève de Brabant. In February 1874 Hallam stayed with the company when it embarked on a tour of New Zealand in which he sang the lead tenor roles in works including Satanella, Fra Diavolo, Der Freischütz and Cinderella. His wife left the tour and went home to Australia to give birth to their daughter, Hattie Cynisca Bella Shepparde Hallam, but she died of peritonitis in childbirth in September 1874 and the daughter shortly after in March 1875. The two are buried together in Melbourne General Cemetery with Mary Langmaid's mother.

== Return to Britain ==
In April 1875 Alice May's company was briefly back in Australia before sailing for Bombay later in the year. During the voyage Margaret Hogan (1858-), a member of the troupe who sang as Maggie Christie, gave birth to a daughter in April 1876 whom she named Almora Howell Hallam. Hogan and Henry Hallam eventually married in Calcutta in January 1877. When the company folded the Hallams and their daughter travelled to Great Britain. Here Hallam toured with Charles Durand's opera company, before appearing in 1877 as Pluto with Kate Santley's production of Orpheus in the Underworld and was Donkeyherd in Happy Hampstead with a score by Richard D’Oyly Carte. Touring with Santley he sang Prince Doro in Princess Toto, was in La fille de Madame Angot and was the Defendant in Trial by Jury. Moving to Hariel Becker's touring company Hallam appeared in John of Paris, Fra Diavolo, La fille de Madame Angot and for Richard South's Opera Company he appeared in Bucalossi's comic opera Pom (1878). His son Henry Richard Hallam (1878-1942) was born at this time.

Hallam toured as Alain in Babiole and in 1879 created the lead male role in Frederick Stanislaus's The Lancashire Witches. He sang in a production of Le Voyage en Chine and toured in La fille de Madame Angot, The Blind Beggars and As You Like It. In 1882 he appeared in the West End in Melita, which failed, before moving on to the more successful The Merry Duchess by George Robert Sims and Frederic Clay at the Royalty Theatre (1883) before playing Jan in The Beggar Student at the Alhambra Theatre (1884). Next he was de Lansac in François les bas-bleus and toured in Olivette with Emily Soldene. His professional reputation in London was ruined when he agreed to sing in the American-style musical comedy Capers at the Standard Theatre (1885) in a piece written by the American composer Richard Stahl in an attempt to launch his wife Bertie Crawford as a soubrette. While Hallam gained such reviews as 'Henry Hallam as the lover is a veritable oasis in this desert of vocal mediocrity or badness', audiences laughed the show off the stage and the production was savaged by the critics. Stahl and Crawford fled back to America and Hallam went with them.

== In America ==
The 35-year old Hallam arrived in the United States in December 1885 and quickly found work with Rudolph Aronson's Company, for which he played Sylvio in The Enchantress with the New York Clipper describing his performance as 'weak and unsatisfactory'. The company next played The Mikado and The Bohemian Girl but the company failed and Hallam moved to the Casino Theatre to play Eugène Marcel in the popular Erminie. He remained at the Casino for over three years, appearing as Count de Rosen in Nadgy (1888), Fairfax in The Yeomen of the Guard (1888), the Duke of Mantua in The Brigands (1889), Fritz in The Grand-Duchesse of Gérolstein, Goncalves in The Brazilian, Ange Pitou in La fille de Madame Angot among other productions before touring in Erminie and Giroflé-Girofla. His attempt at management of the Orpheum Theatre in San Francisco failed and he returned to New York to play Risotto in The Mountebanks (1893) before marrying for the third time in 1893 - to the Dutch-Canadian soprano Josephine Davidson Schoff (1877-), who sang as Josephine Stanton. The problem was he was still married to Maggie Hogan, who did not divorce him until July 1895. The newlyweds toured with Alfa Norman and played in a summer season at Milwaukee before playing in La fille de Madame Angot. Hallam sang in The Isle of Gold which failed before touring in A Stranger in New York. On joining the Boston Lyric Company he played Pietro, Prince of Palma in Boccaccio, Pippo in La mascotte and sang opposite his wife in Fra Diavolo, The Fencing Master and in Scott Marble and Richard Stahl's Said Pascha.

== Later career ==
In March 1900 the Hallams left America for New Zealand where they toured with their own Josephine Stanton Opera Company in Said Pasha, Fra Diavolo, The Fencing Master, Wang and Dorcas. The struggling company went to Australia where it collapsed leading the Hallams to join a tour of George Musgrove's production of the musical comedy A Chinese Honeymoon with Hallam as the Emperor Hang Chow. For Musgrove he also played The Lord Mayor in The Thirty Thieves, General Korboy in The Fortune Teller, Tonio in The Daughter of the Regiment, and the title role in Fra Diavolo. When the tour ended in 1904 the Hallams sailed for England where they played in music halls before sailing for Canada in 1907 and from their crossing into the United States.

In 1912 Hallam began a new career as a character actor in silent films, going on to make over 130 films.

Henry Hallam died in 1921 in New York aged 71 shortly after making his last film.

== Selected filmography ==
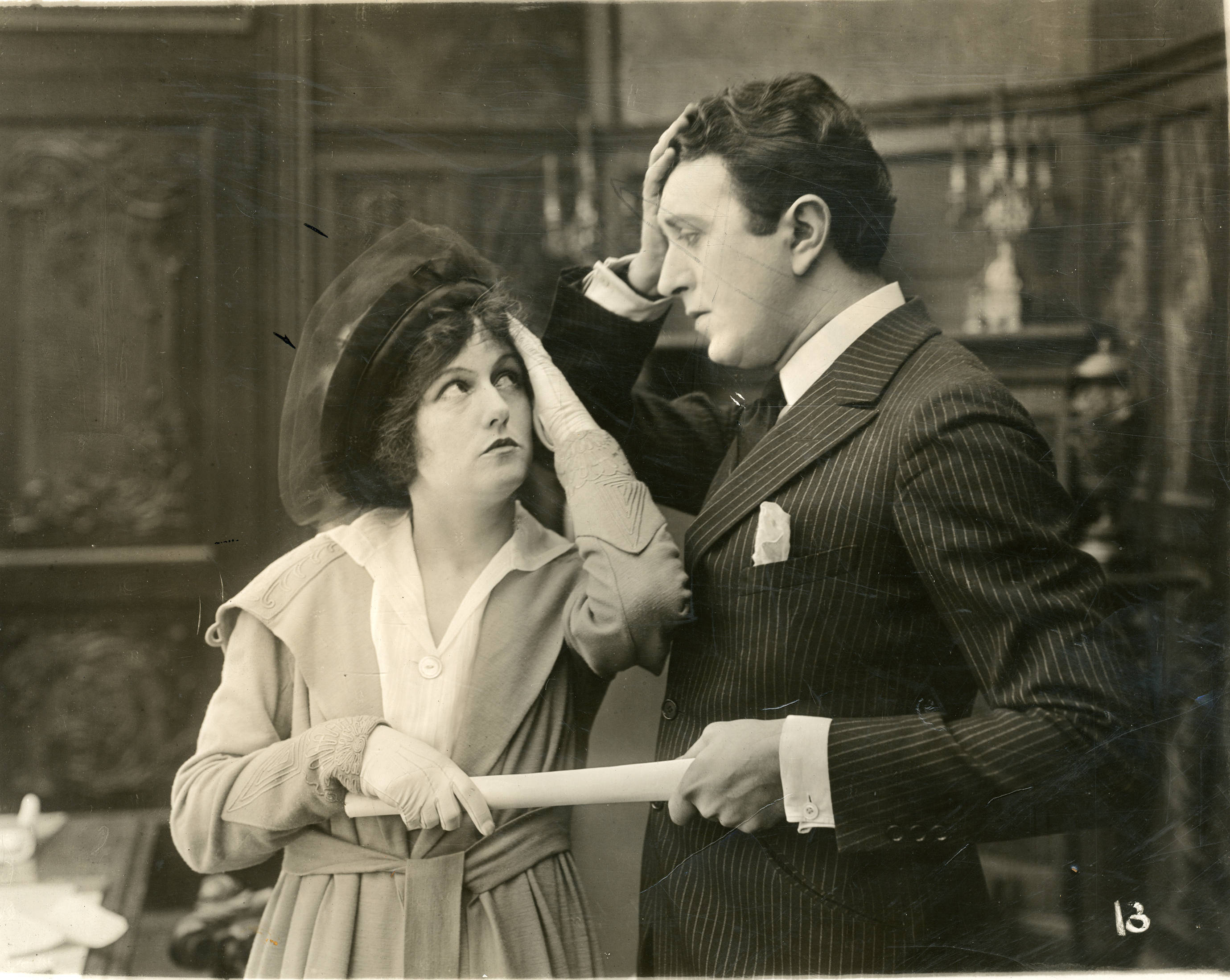
Scene from Bonnie Annie Laurie with Peggy Hyland

- Battle of Pottsburg Bridge (1912)
- The Darling of the C.S.A. (1912), as Major-General Prentiss
- The Drummer Girl of Vicksburg (1912)
- The Wartime Siren (1913)
- The Brand (1914)
- The Siren's Reign (1915)
- The Coquette (1915)
- The Vanderhoff Affair (1915)
- Audrey (1916)
- The Moment Before (1916)
- Blue Jeans (1917), as Colonel Henry Clay Riesener
- Aladdin's Other Lamp (1917), Captain Barnaby
- The Girl Without a Soul (1917)
- Blue-Eyed Mary (1918)
- Bonnie Annie Laurie (1918)
- How Could You, Caroline? (1918)
- Just for Tonight (1918)
- Putting One Over (1919)
- Phil for Short (1919), as College President
- Help! Help! Police! (1919)
- My Little Sister (1919)
- The Lion and the Mouse (1919)
- Cousin Kate (1921)
- Tol'able David (1921), as The Doctor
- The Conquest of Canaan (1921), as Colonel Filmcroft
