= Miss Innocence =

1918 film

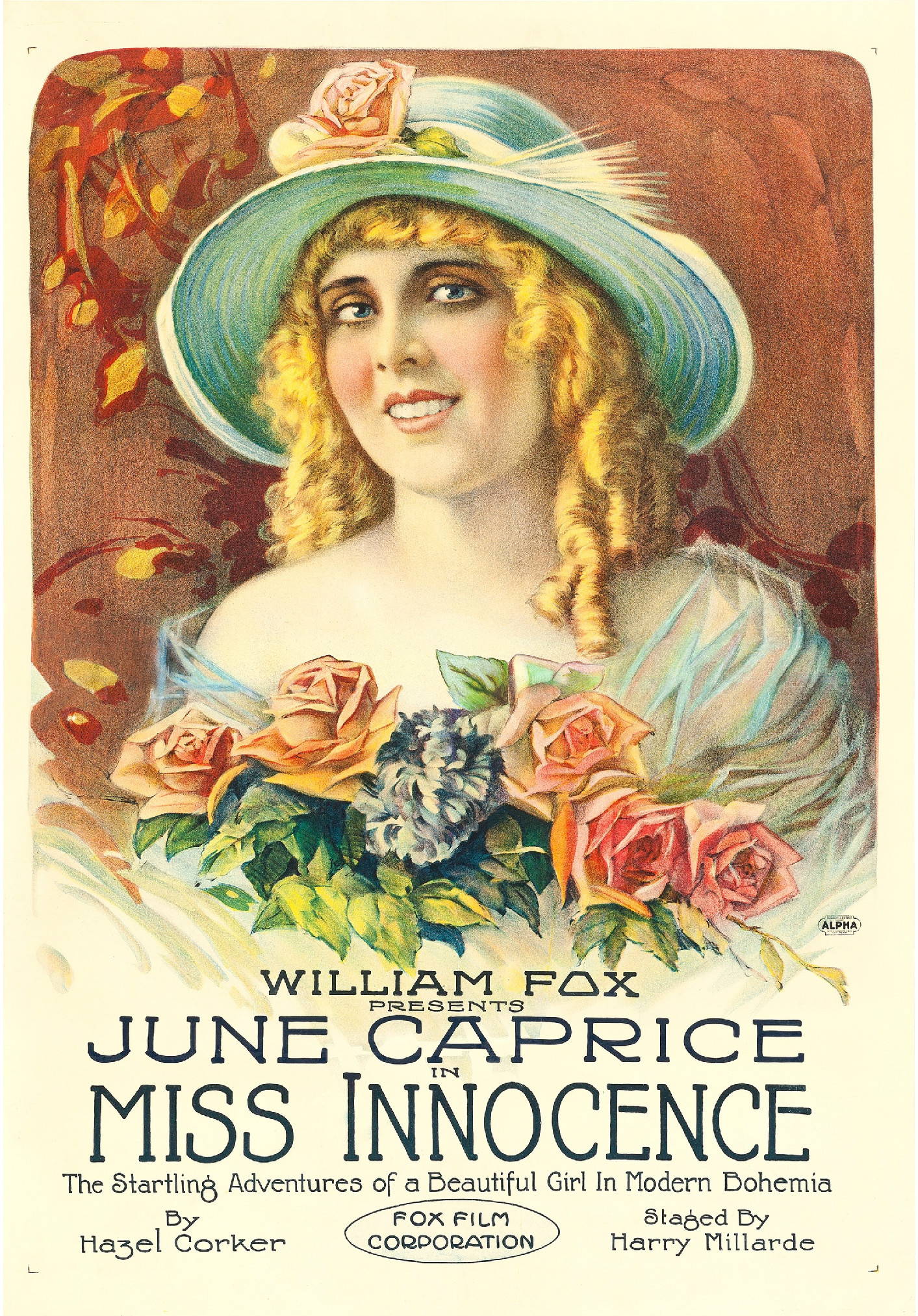
- Theatrical poster
- Directed by: Harry Millarde
- Written by: Thomas F. Fallon
- Based on: a story by Harry Corker
- Produced by: William Fox
- Starring: June Caprice
- Cinematography: Nat Leach
- Distributed by: Fox Film Corporation
- Release date: July 21, 1918
- Running time: 5 reels
- Country: United States
- Language: Silent (English intertitles)

Miss Innocence is a 1918 American silent drama film directed by Harry Millarde and starring June Caprice. It was produced and released by the Fox Film Corporation.

== Cast ==
- June Caprice as Dolores May
- Marie Shotwell as Fay Gonard
- Robert Walker as Henry Grant / Lawrence Grant
- Frank Beamish as Kale Loomis
- Carleton Macy as James Boyle
- Elizabeth Garrison as Mrs. Grant (credited as Mrs. Garrison)

== Preservation ==
With no prints of Miss Innocence in any film archives, it is a lost film.
