= Bonnie Annie Laurie =

1918 film

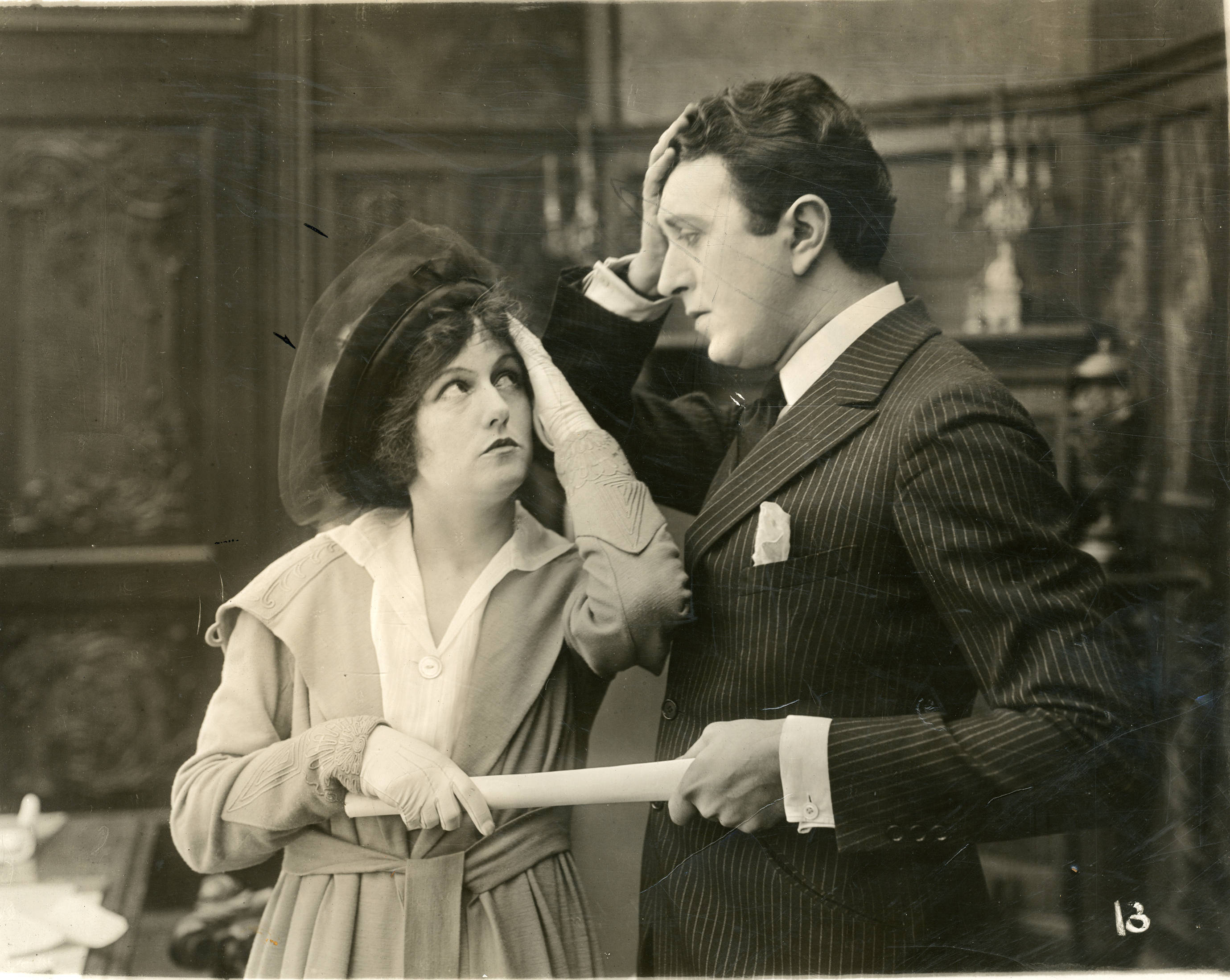
- Scene with Peggy Hyland and Henry Hallam (*note:the actor in the photo is Irving Cummings, not Henry Hallam)
- Directed by: Harry F. Millarde
- Written by: Lela E. Rogers
- Story by: Hamilton Thompson
- Starring: Peggy Hyland; Henry Hallam; William Bailey; Sidney Mason; Marion Singer
- Cinematography: H. Alderson Leach
- Production company: Fox Film Corporation
- Distributed by: Fox Film Corporation
- Release date: September 1, 1918
- Running time: 5 reels
- Country: United States
- Languages: Silent film (English intertitles)

Bonnie Annie Laurie is a 1918 American silent drama film directed by Harry F. Millarde and starring Peggy Hyland, Henry Hallam, William Bailey, Sidney Mason, and Marion Singer. The film was released by Fox Film Corporation on September 1, 1918.

== Cast ==
- Peggy Hyland as Annie Laurie
- Henry Hallam as Sandy Laurie
- William Bailey as Captain Donald McGrego
- Sidney Mason as Andy McGregor
- Marion Singer as Nan, the Nurse

== Preservation ==
The film is now considered lost.
