= Marilyn Harris (actress) =

American child actress (1924–1999)

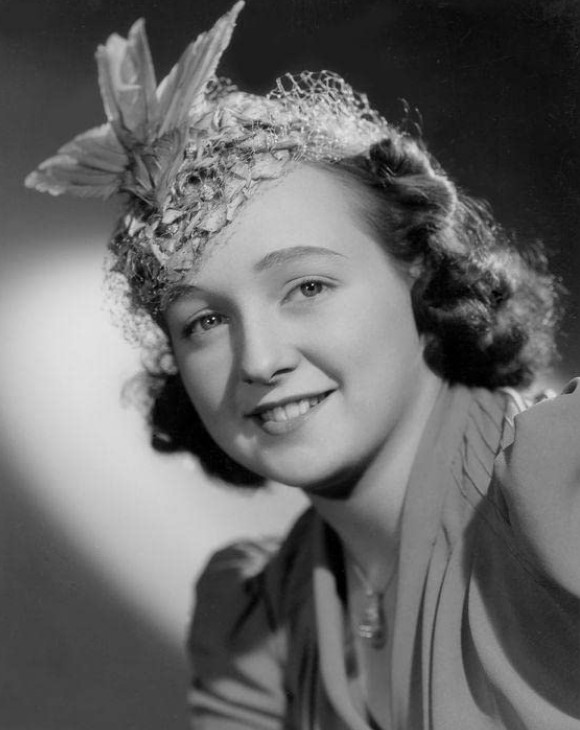
- Harris in 1942
- Born: July 17, 1924; San Fernando, California, U.S.
- Died: December 1, 1999 (aged 75); Los Angeles, California, U.S.
- Occupation: Child actress
- Years active: 1924–1944
- Known for: "Little Maria" in Frankenstein
- Spouses: Wally Watkins (m. 1944–1981): Carl (m.?–1988)
- Children: 1

Marilyn Harris (July 17, 1924 – December 1, 1999) was an American child actress who appeared in several Hollywood productions in the 1930s and 1940s. She is best remembered for her role as "Little Maria" in the 1931 horror film Frankenstein.

== Early life and career ==
Harris was born in San Fernando, California and placed in a Los Angeles orphanage shortly after her birth. She was adopted by an area couple when she was a month old. Shortly after her adoption, she appeared in a Rin Tin Tin film. In her later years, Harris revealed that her adoptive mother forced her to pursue a screen career because of her own failed attempts to become an actress. Harris also claimed that her mother was physically and emotionally abusive.

In 1931, Harris won the role of "Little Maria" in the horror film Frankenstein. In arguably the film's most memorable scene, Maria meets the fugitive monster (played by Boris Karloff) beside a lake and charms the monster with her innocence, humanity and friendship. These were qualities that he had not experienced with hostile, untrusting adults. A children's game is tragically misinterpreted by the monster, and he throws Little Maria into the lake, unintentionally drowning her and turning the surrounding village's population into a lynch mob, seeking revenge after the child's body is found. The shot of Maria being thrown into the water was cut from original prints, and was restored in the 1980s.

After appearing in Frankenstein, Harris continued her career in small film roles. She left acting at the age of 19 shortly after marrying Wally Watkins, a bouncer she met while working as a cashier at the Hollywood Palladium. The couple had a son the following year. After Harris' husband died in 1981, she remarried. Harris' second husband, Carl, died in 1988.

== Filmography ==
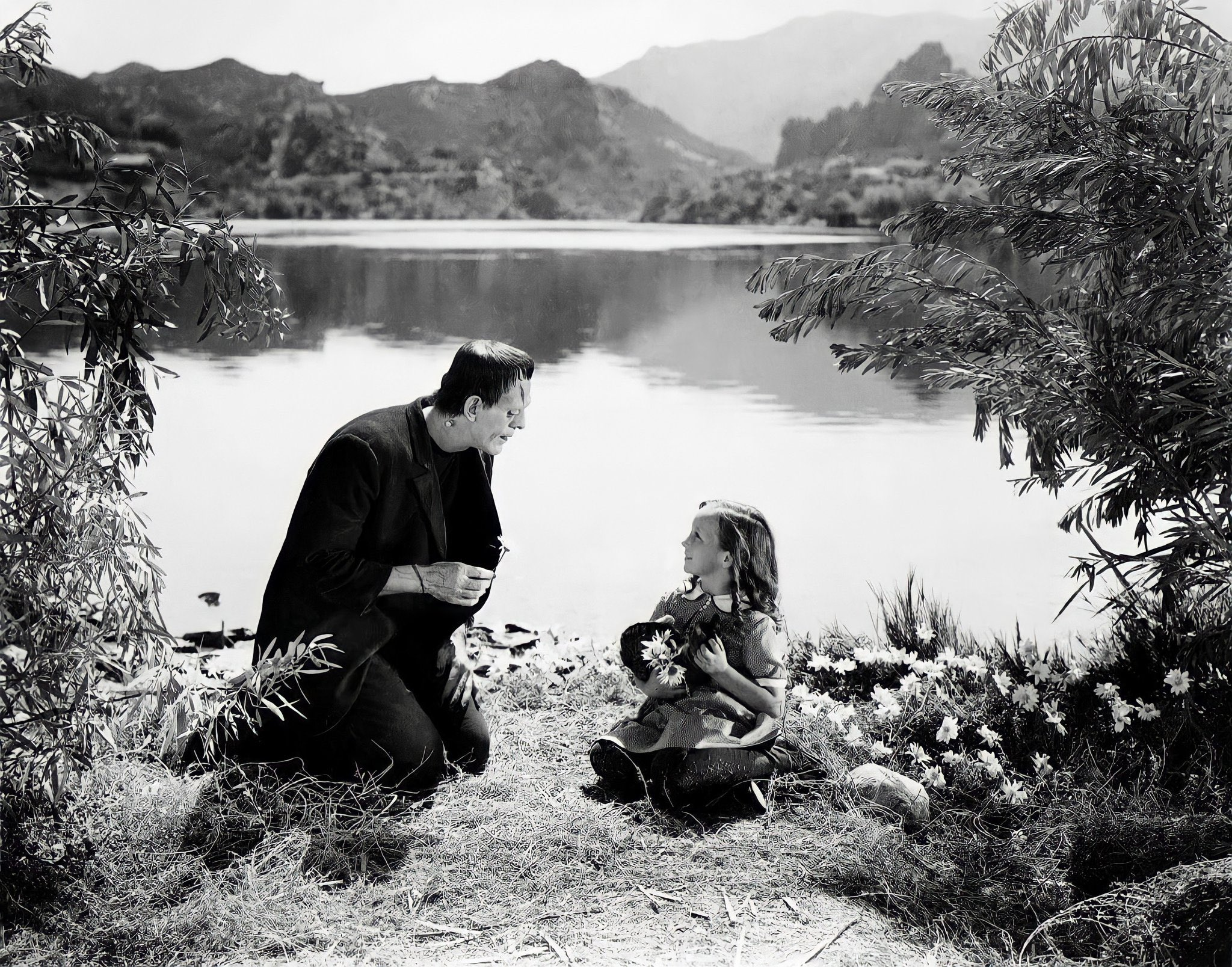
Boris Karloff and Marilyn Harris in Frankenstein (1931)

Year	Title	Role	Notes
1930	The Big Trail	Pioneer Girl	Uncredited
1931	Frankenstein	Little Maria	
1931	Over the Hill	Susan Shelby in Prologue	
1932	Destry Rides Again	Schoolgirl	Uncredited; Alternative title: Justice Rides Again
1932	Wild Girl	Anna May	Uncredited
1932	Six Hours to Live	Flower Girl	Uncredited
1933	Tugboat Annie	Pat Severn, as a Child	Uncredited
1934	A Wicked Woman	Rosanne as a Girl	
1935	The Bride of Frankenstein	Girl	Uncredited
1936	Show Boat	Little Girl	Uncredited
1937	Maytime	Maypole singer	Uncredited
1937	The Road Back	Maria - Ernst's Sister	
1943	Henry Aldrich Gets Glamour	Gwendolyn	Uncredited
1943	Young Ideas	Co-ed	Uncredited
1944	Standing Room Only	Secretary	Uncredited
1944	Henry Aldrich's Little Secret	Minor Role	Uncredited, (final film role)
