= The Tavern Keeper's Daughter =

- Directed by: D. W. Griffith; Wallace McCutcheon Jr.
- Starring: Florence Auer
- Release date: July 24, 1908
- Running time: 7 minutes
- Country: United States
- Languages: Silent; English intertitles

The Tavern Keeper's Daughter is a 1908 American silent action film directed by D. W. Griffith. The film was shot in Fort Lee, New Jersey, when many early film studios in America's first motion picture industry were based there at the beginning of the 20th century.

== Cast ==
- George Gebhardt as Mexican
- Edward Dillon as Father
- Florence Auer as Mother
- Marion Leonard as Daughter
- Harry Solter as Old Man
- Marion Sunshine

== See also ==
- D. W. Griffith filmography
- List of American films of 1908
