= Blue-Eyed Mary (film) =

1918 film

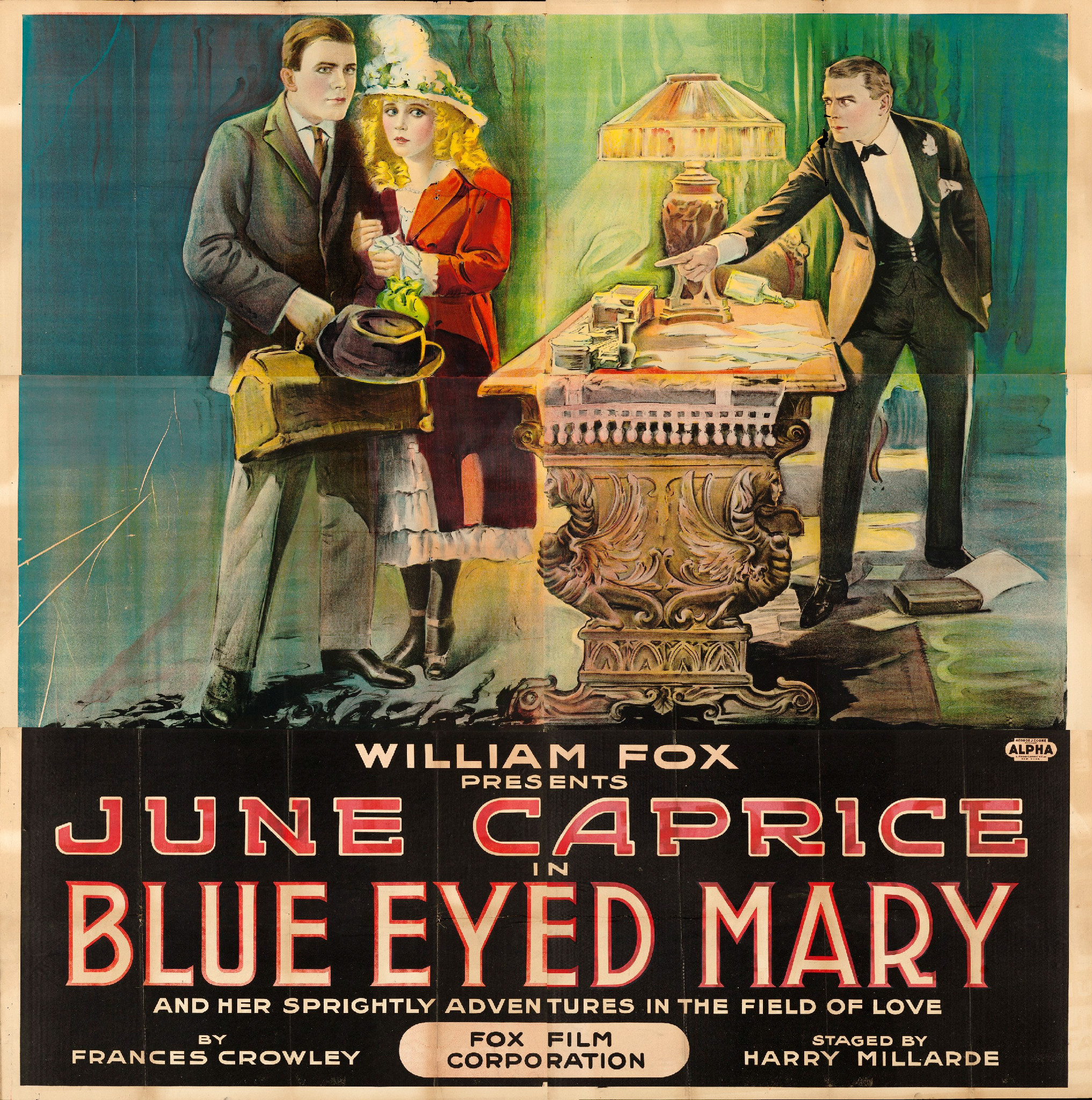
- Directed by: Harry Millarde
- Written by: Adrian Johnson; Frances Crowley
- Produced by: William Fox
- Starring: June Caprice
- Cinematography: H. Alderson Leach
- Distributed by: Fox Film Corporation
- Release date: June 2, 1918
- Running time: 5 reels
- Country: USA
- Language: Silent ... English intertitles

Blue-Eyed Mary is a lost 1918 silent film drama directed by Harry Millarde and starring June Caprice. It was produced and released by Fox Film Corporation.

== Cast ==
- June Caprice - Mary Du Bois
- Helen Tracy - Mrs. Van Twiller Du Bois
- Blanche Hines - Jeanette
- Bernard Randall - Cecil Harrington
- Thomas F. Fallon - Jones, the Butler (*as Thomas Fallon)
- Jack McLean - Tom Vane
- Florence Ashbrooke - Bridget
- Henry Hallam - Henry Leffingwell

== See also ==
- 1937 Fox vault fire
