= Oh, Boy! (1919 film) =

1919 film by Albert Capellani

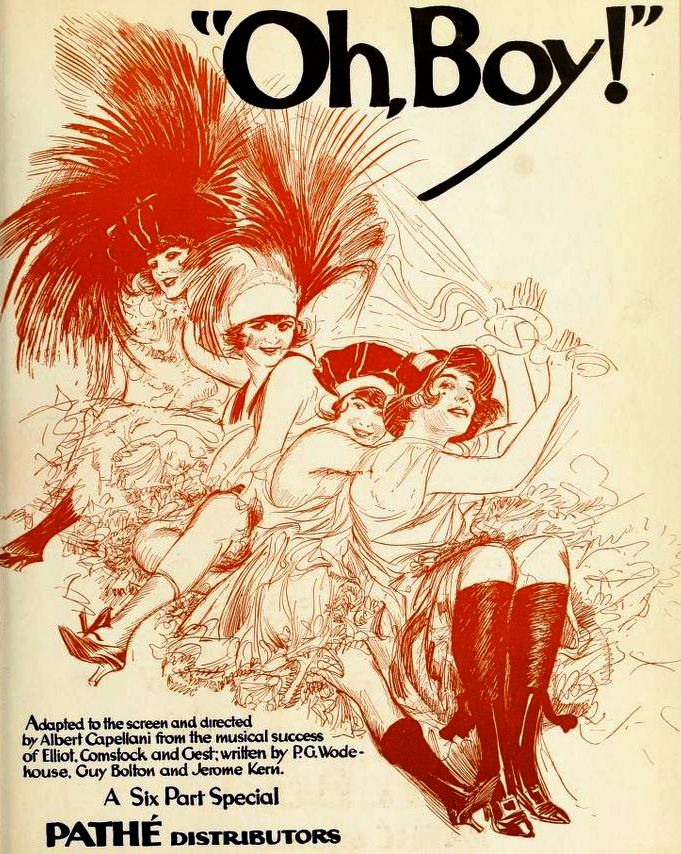
- Advertisement
- Directed by: Albert Capellani
- Written by: Albert Capellani
- Based on: Oh, Boy! by Guy Bolton and P.G. Wodehouse
- Produced by: Albert Capellani
- Starring: June Caprice; Creighton Hale; Zena Keefe
- Cinematography: Lucien N. Andriot
- Production company: Albert Capellani Productions
- Distributed by: Pathé Exchange
- Release date: June 22, 1919
- Running time: 60 minutes
- Country: United States
- Language: Silent (English intertitles)

Oh, Boy! is a 1919, American silent comedy film directed by Albert Capellani and starring June Caprice, Creighton Hale, and Zena Keefe. It was based on the stage musical of the same name written by Guy Bolton and P. G. Wodehouse. The neologism "filmusical comedy" was branded for the film. The Jerome Kern Encyclopedia notes: "A talkie version was never made, and surprisingly, the musical has never received a Broadway revival ...".

== Cast ==
- June Caprice as Lou Ellen Carter
- Creighton Hale as George Budd
- Zena Keefe as Jackie Sampson
- Flora Finch as Miss Penelope Budd
- William H. Thompson as Judge Daniel Carter
- Grace Reals as Mrs. Carter
- Joseph Conyers as Constable Simms
- J.K. Murray as Dean of Richguys College
- Maurice 'Lefty' Flynn as Lefty Flynn
- Albert Capellani as Orchestra leader
- Ben Taggart as Charles Hartley

== Bibliography ==
- Brian Taves. P.G. Wodehouse and Hollywood: Screenwriting, Satires and Adaptations. McFarland, 2006.
