= June Caprice =

American actress (1895–1936)

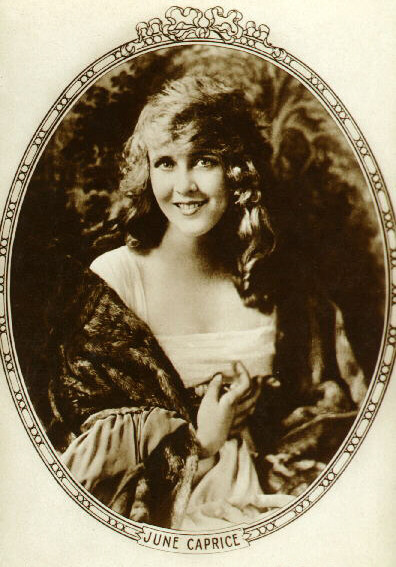
- Born: Helen Elizabeth Lawson; November 19, 1895; Arlington, Massachusetts, U.S.
- Died: November 9, 1936 (aged 40); Los Angeles, California, U.S.
- Other name: The Vamp
- Years active: 1916–1921
- Spouse: Harry F. Millarde (m.1923–1931, his death)
- Children: Toni Seven

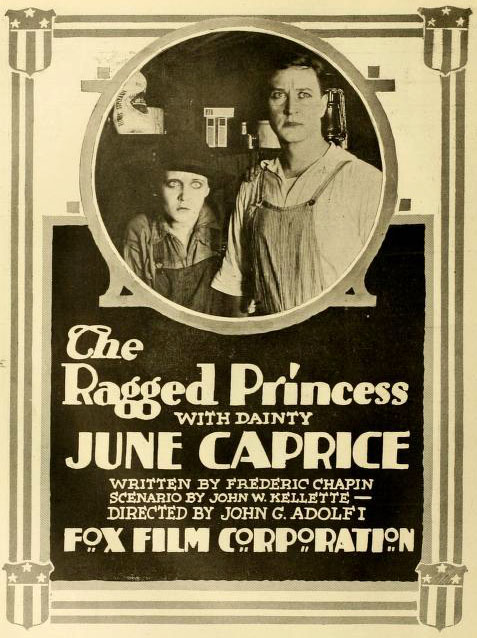
The Ragged Princess (1916)

June Caprice, born Helen Elizabeth Lawson; November 19, 1895 – November 9, 1936, was an American silent film actress.

== Early life and career ==
Born Helen Elizabeth Lawson in Arlington, Massachusetts, Caprice was educated in Boston.

She began her acting career in live theatre and in 1916 signed with the Fox Film Corporation. In 1916 William Fox searched to find a "second Mary Pickford." By the summer of that year he believed he had located the woman he predicted would be the best known female on the screen within six months time. The 1916 press release claimed both that she was a 17-year-old teenager, and in the same press release "just a little over 17 years of age." Her obituary in 1936 listed her age as 40, making her about 20 years of age at her discovery.

Caprice's screen debut came in Caprice of the Mountains (1916). A New York Times film critic said of her, "she is young, pretty, graceful, petite, with an eloquence of gesture that augurs a bright future in the movies." Adopting the stage name June Caprice, she made sixteen films for Fox, half of which were directed by Harry F. Millarde. The two began a personal relationship and eventually married.

== Retirement ==
She left the film business to begin a family, giving birth to a daughter June Elizabeth Millarde in 1922. It is believed she returned to working on stage and modeling, appearing on 1920s Coca-Cola company calendars holding a fountain glass of Coke. In 1931 her husband died at the age of forty-six. Caprice died five years later from a heart attack in Los Angeles. She had been suffering from cancer. She was interred in the Forest Lawn Memorial Park Cemetery in Glendale, California.

Caprice's daughter was fourteen years old when orphaned and was raised by her grandparents on Long Island, New York. June Millarde became a cover girl known as Toni Seven. She was the heiress to an estimated $3,000,000 fortune.

== Filmography ==
Key
†	Denotes a lost or presumed lost film.

Film credits of June Caprice
Year	Title	Role	Studio/Distributor	Ref(s)
1916	The Ragged Princess †	Alicia Jones	Fox Film	
1916	Caprice of the Mountains †	Caprice Talbert	Fox Film	
1916	Little Miss Happiness †	Lucy White	Fox Film	
1916	The Mischief Maker †	Effie Marchand	Fox Film	
1917	The Small Town Girl †	June	Fox Film	
1917	A Child of the Wild †	June Griest	Fox Film	
1917	Patsy †	Patsy Prim	Fox Film	
1917	Miss U.S.A. †	June	Fox Film	
1917	Every Girl's Dream †	Gretchen	Fox Film	
1917	A Modern Cinderella †	Joyce	Fox Film	
1917	The Sunshine Maid †	(unknown)	Fox Film	
1917	Unknown 274 †	Dora Belton, in later life	Fox Film	
1918	A Camouflage Kiss †	Martha Thorne	Fox Film	
1918	Blue-Eyed Mary †	Mary Du Bois	Fox Film	
1918	The Heart of Romance †	Eloise Jackson	Fox Film	
1918	Miss Innocence †	Dolores May	Fox Film	
1919	A Damsel in Distress †	Maud Marsh	Albert Capellani Productions, Inc.	
1919	Oh, Boy! †	Lou Ellen Carter	Albert Capellani Productions, Inc.	
1919	The Love Cheat †	Louise Gordon	Albert Capellani Productions, Inc.	
1920	Rogues and Romance feature-length version of Pirate Gold	Sylvia Lee	George B. Seitz Productions	
1920	In Walked Mary	Mary Ann Hubbard	Albert Capellani Productions, Inc.	
1921	The Sky Ranger †	June Elliott	George B. Seitz Productions	

== Bibliography ==
- Fox, Charles Donald.; Silver, Milton L. (1920). Who's who on the screen. Ross Publishing Co.
