= Anne Austin (writer) =

American writer of romance and mystery novels

Anne Austin (September 13, 1895 – ?) was an American journalist and writer of romance and mystery novels.

== Biography ==
Anne Austin was born in Waco, Texas. She married Charles Benson in 1912, whom she divorced soon after the birth of their child, Ellen Elizabeth. In 1922, she married Stewart Edmund Book (whom she also divorced). From 1912 to 1914 she attended Baylor University. Her first occupation was as a high school teacher in Marfa and Moody, Texas. She then worked as a feature and fiction writer and a dramatic critic for the Waco Morning News, the Kansas City Post, and other periodicals. From 1926 to 1930, she wrote for Newspaper Enterprise Association (NEA Service), where she produced several serialized romance novels that were later published as books. In 1934, one of them was turned into the movie A Wicked Woman.

In 1929, Austin's first mystery novel The Black Pigeon was serialized in newspapers and subsequently published as a book. The story, written in the heyday of the Golden Age of Detective Fiction, was a success and translated into several languages (e.g., German, Hungarian and French), which led to five more mystery novels featuring the investigator James "Bonnie" Dundee.

Starting in 1933, Austin was under contract as a writer at Metro-Goldwyn-Mayer studios; in 1939, she was living in Hollywood, California. After the 1930s, she published no more books and seems to have disappeared entirely from the public; nothing is known about her further life.

== Mother of child prodigy ==
Austin's only child, Ellen Elizabeth Benson (born 1913 in Waco, Texas), was measured with an I.Q. of 214 at the age of eight, then the highest ever recorded, and became a celebrity. At 13, during her sophomore year at Barnard College in New York City, she published a book of her own, The Younger Generation. In a series of newspaper articles, Austin described how she managed to support her child while being a single working mother, unusual at the time.

== Publications ==
=== Mystery novels ===
- The Black Pigeon, New York: Greenberg (1929); previously serialized in newspapers in 1929
- The Avenging Parrot, New York: Greenberg (1930); previously serialized in newspapers in 1929. This novel introduced the investigator James "Bonnie" Dundee, who was also featured in the following mysteries.
- Murder Backstairs, New York: The Macmillan Company (1930); previously serialized in newspapers in 1930
- Murder at Bridge, New York: The Macmillan Company (1931); previously serialized in newspapers in 1930
- One Drop of Blood, New York: The Macmillan Company (1932)
- Murdered, But Not Dead, New York: The Macmillan Company (1939)

Resurrected Press reissued all of Austin's mystery novels between 2012 and 2015.

=== Other novels ===
- Jackson Street, New York: Greenberg (1927)
- Daughters of Midas, Chicago: The White House (1929)
- The Penny Princess, Chicago: The White House (1929)
- Girl Alone, Chicago: The White House (1930)
- Rival Wives, Chicago: The White House (1930)
- A Wicked Woman, New York: The Macmillan Company (1933)
- Saint and Sinner (1936)
