= Toni Seven =

American actress (1922–1991)

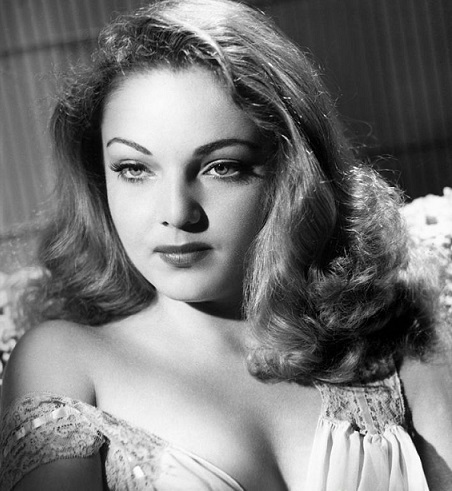
- Born: June Elizabeth Millarde; July 6, 1922; New York City, New York, U.S.
- Died: May 21, 1991 (aged 68); Gaithersburg, Maryland, U.S.
- Spouse: Eric Stanley (m.1959)
- Parents: Harry F. Millarde (father); June Caprice (mother)

June Elizabeth Millarde (July 6, 1922 – May 21, 1991), better known as Toni Seven, was an American cover girl and actress.

== Early life ==
Millarde was born in July 1922 in New York City, the only child of actress June Caprice and film director Harry F. Millarde. She was eight years old when her father died and fourteen when her mother died. She was then raised by her grandparents, the Peter Lawsons, in Long Island, New York. The June 17, 1949, issue of Time magazine reported she was the heiress to an estimated $3,000,000 fortune.

== Actress ==
In the early 1940s, Seven appeared in minor roles in three films. Her screen debut came in Miss Seventeen, a production of Producers Releasing Corporation. With the advent of World War II, she was one of the many volunteers at the Hollywood Canteen.

She changed her name to Toni Seven in June 1944 so that she could sign her name Toni 7. Publicity man Russ Birdwell conceived the Seven name. Seven was accompanied to Los Angeles Superior Court by attorney Jerry Giesler, when she petitioned that her name be changed. Seven was tested for a contract by film producer Hunt Stromberg and received a large buildup in military service publications. In August 1944, Seven was receiving five hundred letters weekly from fans.

== Model ==
Seven was part of the first pin-up exhibition ever held in the United States. She was joined by screen stars Jane Russell and Martha Tilton in an event which included life-size photos of the actresses. The show, which included autograph sessions and personal appearances, began on November 26, 1944. The locale was the Hollywood U.S.O. at 1531 North Cahuenga Boulevard, Los Angeles, California.

The Society of Photographic Illustrators voted Seven's legs the best among actresses' anatomical features, which when combined, would compose the perfect model. Actresses who were selected in the poll included Miriam Hopkins (lips), Paulette Goddard (bust), and Betty Grable (hips). The cameramen announced their choices in May 1946.

== Theater ==
In 1946, Broadway producer W. Horace Schmidlapp planned a revival of Accent On Youth by Samson Raphaelson. The theatrical presentation was to feature Seven in a leading role. In 1947, Seven sold her Benedict Canyon home and moved to New York City.

== Personal life ==
In January 1949, newspapers linked her romantically with U.S. Senator Warren G. Magnuson. The Washington senator was forty-three years old and described as the most eligible bachelor in the United States Capitol. Seven was pursued in Paris, France, by Peruvian playboy Alfredo Carreo, in 1949. She reassumed the name June Millarde in 1959. That year she planned a June wedding to Eric Stanley of Washington, D.C.

Seven died on May 21, 1991, at the age of 68.

== Sources ==
- Coshocton Tribune, Dorothy Kilgallen, May 11, 1959, Page 4.
- Kingsport News, "On Broadway", September 13, 1949, Page 4.
- Los Angeles Times, Edwin Schallert column, June 19, 1944, Page 10.
- Los Angeles Times, Edwin Schallert column, August 26, 1944, Page 5.
- Los Angeles Times, "First Pin-Up Exhibit Opens in Hollywood", November 27, 1944, Page A1.
- Los Angeles Times, "Perfect Model Described By Cameramen", May 22, 1946, Page 2.
- Los Angeles Times, "Missing Senator Hunt Shifts To Hollywood", January 7, 1949, Page 2.
- New York Times, "Of Local Origin", February 21, 1945, Page 12.
- New York Times, "News And Gossip Of The Rialto", March 3, 1946, Page 11.
- Oakland Tribune, "June Millarde Flees From Parental Patronage To Launch Own Film Career", July 20, 1944, Page 14.
- Trenton Evening Times, "Daughter Arrives At Home of Film Actress, Director", July 10, 1922
