= Harry F. Millarde =

American actor and director (1885–1931)

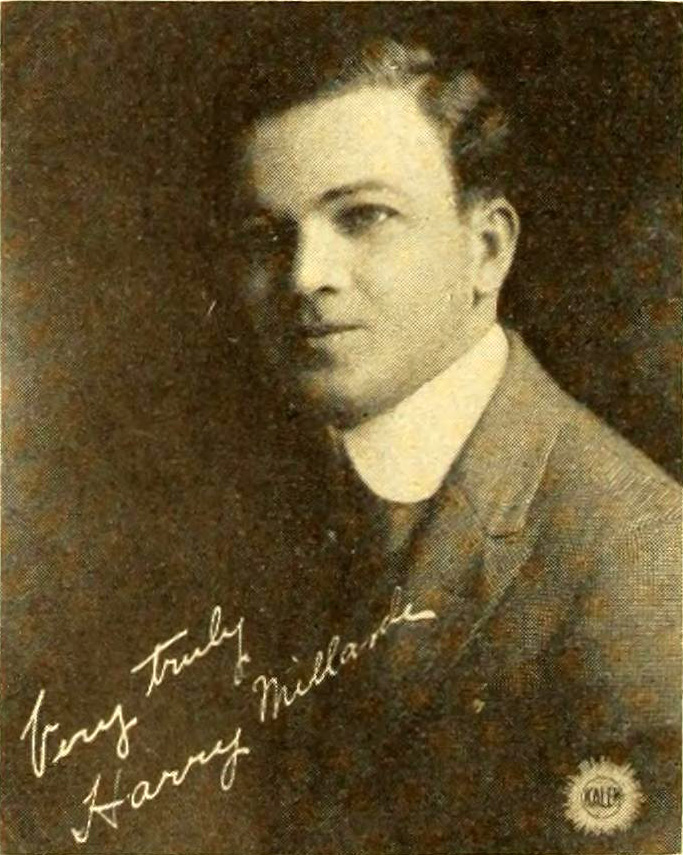
- Millarde in 1916
- Born: November 12, 1885; Cincinnati, Ohio, US
- Died: November 2, 1931 (aged 45); New York City, US
- Occupations: Film director; actor
- Spouse: June Caprice (m. 1923)
- Children: Toni Seven

Harry F. Millarde (November 12, 1885 – November 2, 1931) was an American silent film actor and director.

== Biography ==
Millarde was born in Cincinnati, Ohio, and began his acting in film in 1913 with Kalem Studios in New York City. In 1916, he directed the first of his thirty-two films the most notable of which was If Winter Comes (1923) for Fox Film Corporation that was based on the books of author A. S. M. Hutchinson. Amongst Millarde's other works were Over the Hill to the Poorhouse (1920) and the thriller My Friend the Devil (1922) based on the French novel, Le Docteur Rameau by Georges Ohnet.

Millarde directed his last film in 1927 and died of a heart attack in New York City in 1931. He was married to actress June Caprice (1895-1936), whom he had directed in eight films for Fox.

Their daughter, June Elizabeth Millarde, was 14 years old when her mother died. Raised by her grandparents in Long Island, New York, she became a cover girl known as Toni Seven. The June 17, 1949, issue of Time reported she was the heiress to an estimated $3-million fortune.

== Partial filmography ==
- Breaking into the Big League (1913)
- The Octoroon (1913)
- The Vampire (1913)
- The Vampire's Trail (1914)
- The Siren's Reign (1915)
- Little Miss Nobody (1917)
- Every Girl's Dream (1917)
- Blue-Eyed Mary (1918)
- Miss Innocence (1918)
- Bonnie Annie Laurie (1918)
- Gambling in Souls (1919)
- The Love That Dares (1919)
- When Fate Decides (1919)
- Rose of the West (1919)
- The White Moll (1920)
- Over the Hill to the Poorhouse (1920)
- My Friend the Devil (1922)
- The Town That Forgot God (1922)
- If Winter Comes (1923)
- The Governor's Lady (1923)
- The Fool (1925)
- The Taxi Dancer (1927)
