= List of Emerson College people =

This is a list of notable alumni, faculty, and administrators of Emerson College, a private university located in Boston, Massachusetts.

== Notable alumni ==
=== Film and television production ===
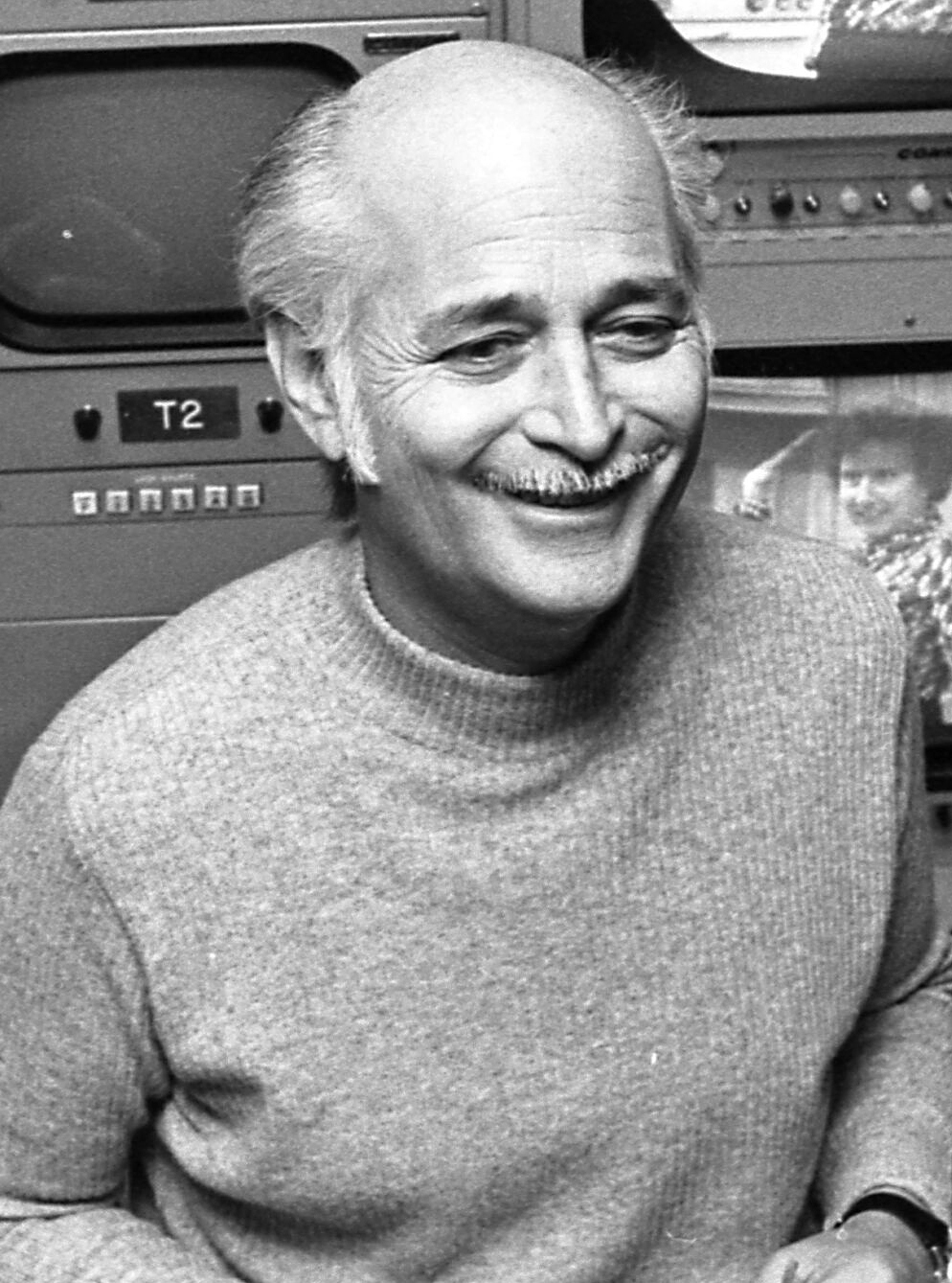
Norman Lear

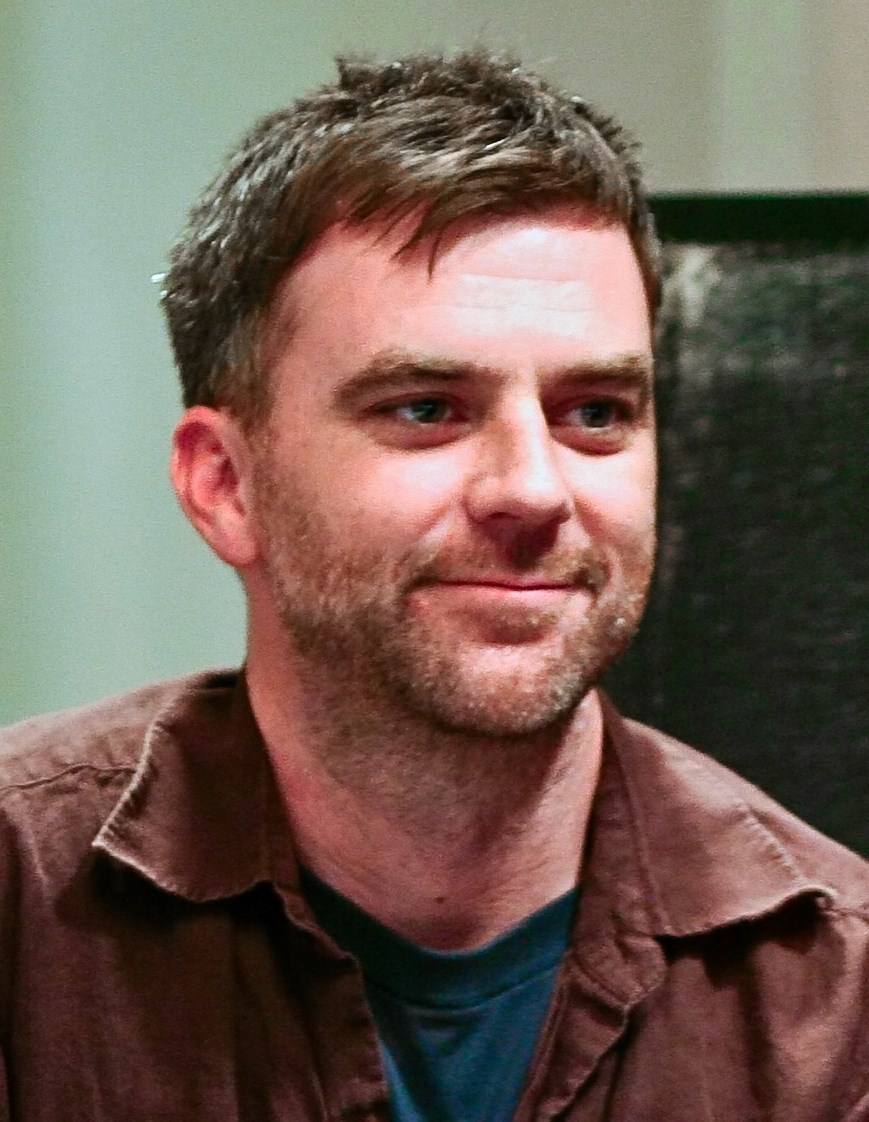
Paul Thomas Anderson

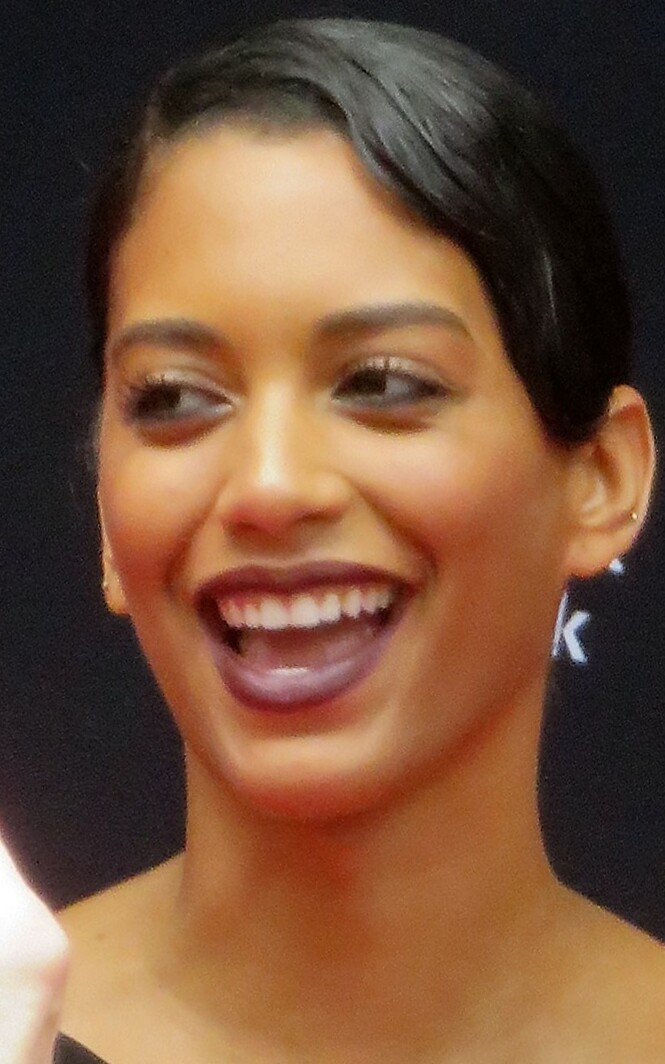
Stefani Robinson

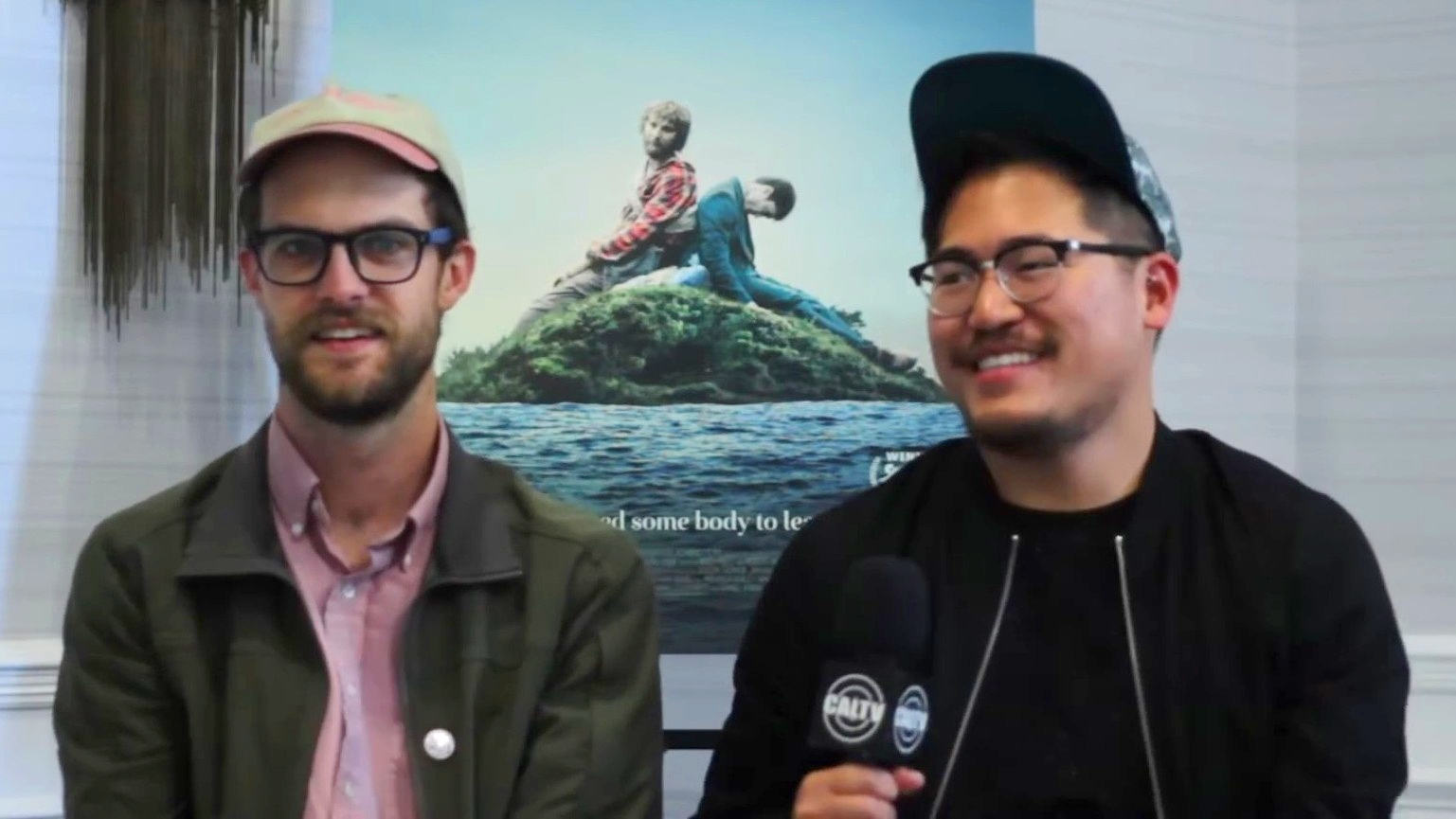
The Daniels

- Pamela Abdy (1995), film producer and executive, co-CEO of Warner Bros.
- Patricia Alvarado Nuñez (MA, 1993), television producer and director for PBS
- Paul Thomas Anderson (did not graduate), Academy Award-winning director known for Boogie Nights and There Will Be Blood
- Roberto Bentivegna, screenwriter known for House of Gucci
- Jay Bienstock (1987), television producer
- Dave Blass (1990), production designer
- Kevin S. Bright (1976), television producer known for Friends
- Jim Cummings (2009), filmmaker and actor known for Thunder Road
- The Daniels (Daniel Kwan '10 and Daniel Scheinert '09), directors known for Swiss Army Man and Everything Everywhere All at Once
- Vin Di Bona (1966), television producer known for MacGyver
- Paul Dini (1979), screenwriter, known for Batman: The Animated Series
- David Flebotte, television producer and writer
- John Frink (1985), screenwriter known for The Simpsons
- Todd J. Greenwald (1991), television producer known for Wizards of Waverly Place
- John Harrison (1971), director and producer best known for Dune and Frank Herbert's Dune
- Doug Herzog (1981), television producer and MTV Networks executive
- Shane Hurlbut (1987), cinematographer
- Laura Kightlinger, television writer and producer
- Marci Klein (did not graduate), television producer known for Saturday Night Live and 30 Rock
- Richard LaGravenese (1980), director and screenwriter known for The Bridges of Madison County
- Norman Lear (did not graduate), television producer known for All in the Family and Sanford and Son
- Adele Lim (1996), director known for Crazy Rich Asians
- Joe Mande (2005), television producer and writer
- Terry Matalas (1998), television producer known for 12 Monkeys and Star Trek: Picard
- Michael McCusker (1988), editor known for Logan and Ford v Ferrari
- Erik Messerschmidt (2003), cinematographer known for Mank
- Amir Mokri (1981), cinematographer
- Max Mutchnick (1987), television producer known for Will & Grace
- Anna Hamilton Phelan (1965), screenwriter known for Girl, Interrupted
- Brittany Martin Porter (2010), television producer known for The Voice
- Felicia Pride (MA, 2005), writer and producer known for Grey's Anatomy
- Jacobo Rispa, Spanish television producer
- Stefani Robinson (2014), screenwriter known for Atlanta and What We Do in the Shadows
- Bill Schulz (1998), writer and television producer
- George Scribner (1975), director and animator known for Oliver & Company
- Tyler Taormina (2013), director and screenwriter known for Christmas Eve in Miller's Point
- Alex Tse (1998), screenwriter known for Watchmen
- Lilly Wachowski (did not graduate), director and screenwriter known for The Matrix
- Harris Wittels (2006), comedian and television writer known for Parks and Recreation

=== Acting and performing arts ===
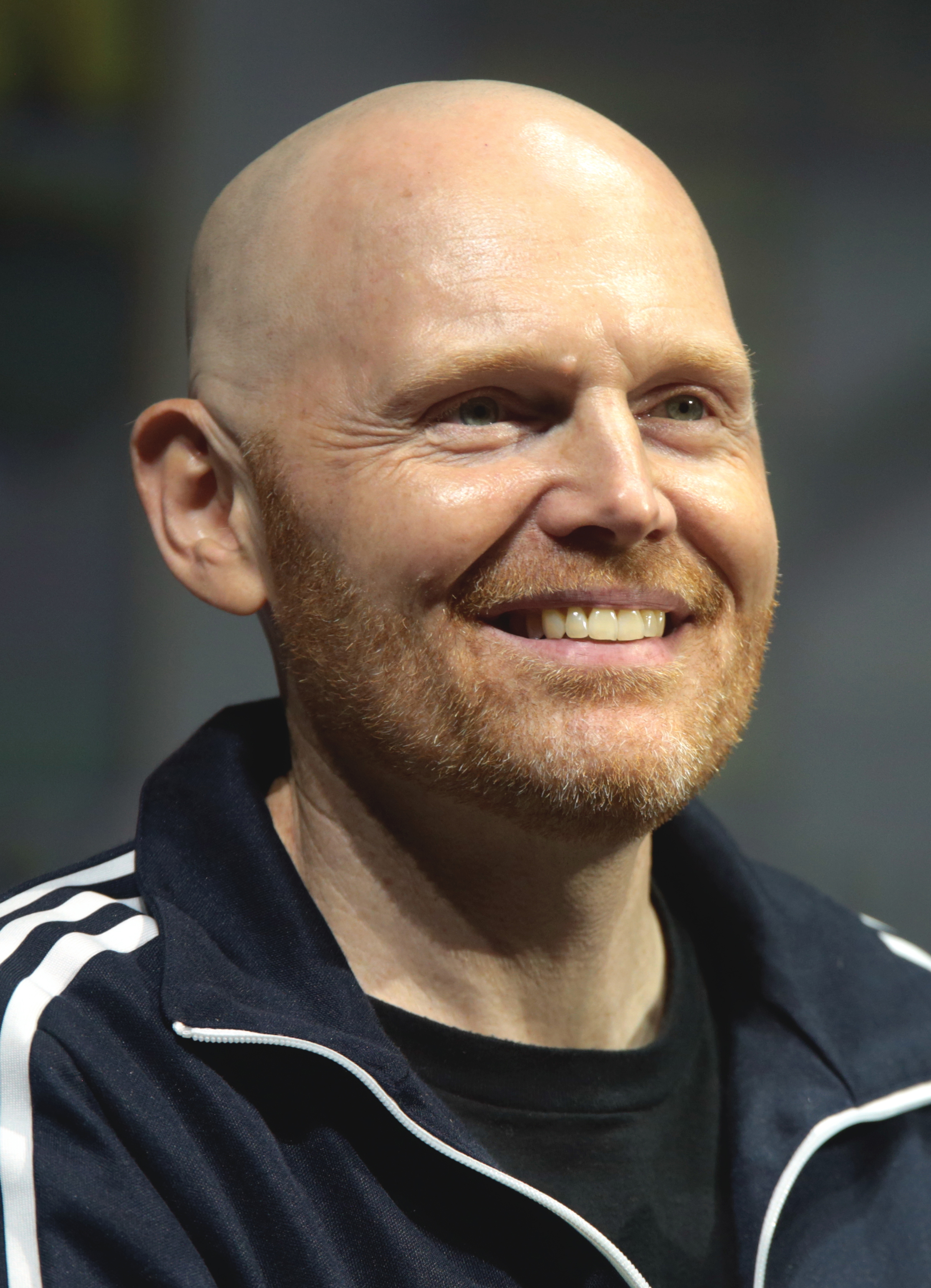
Bill Burr

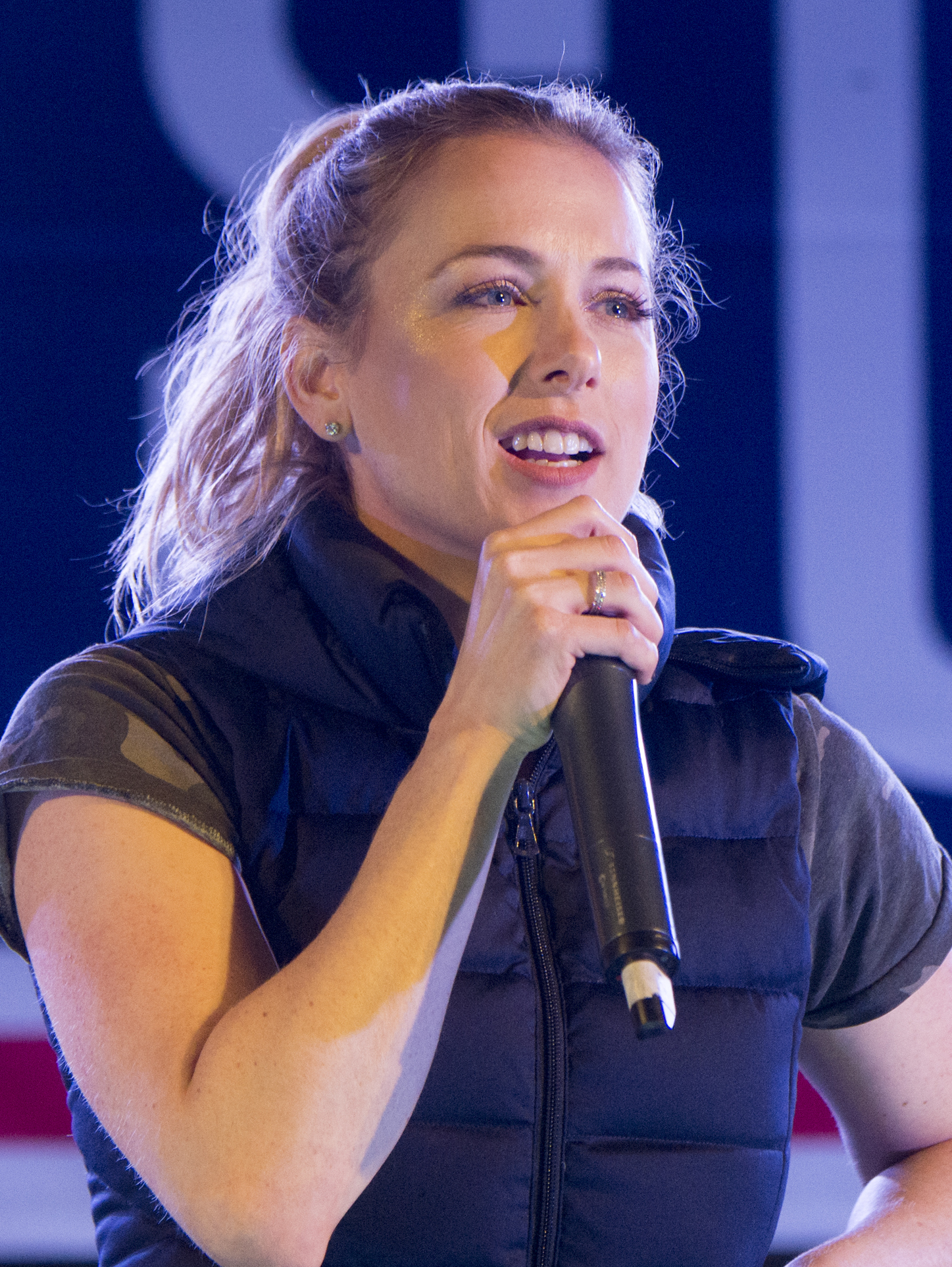
Iliza Schlesinger

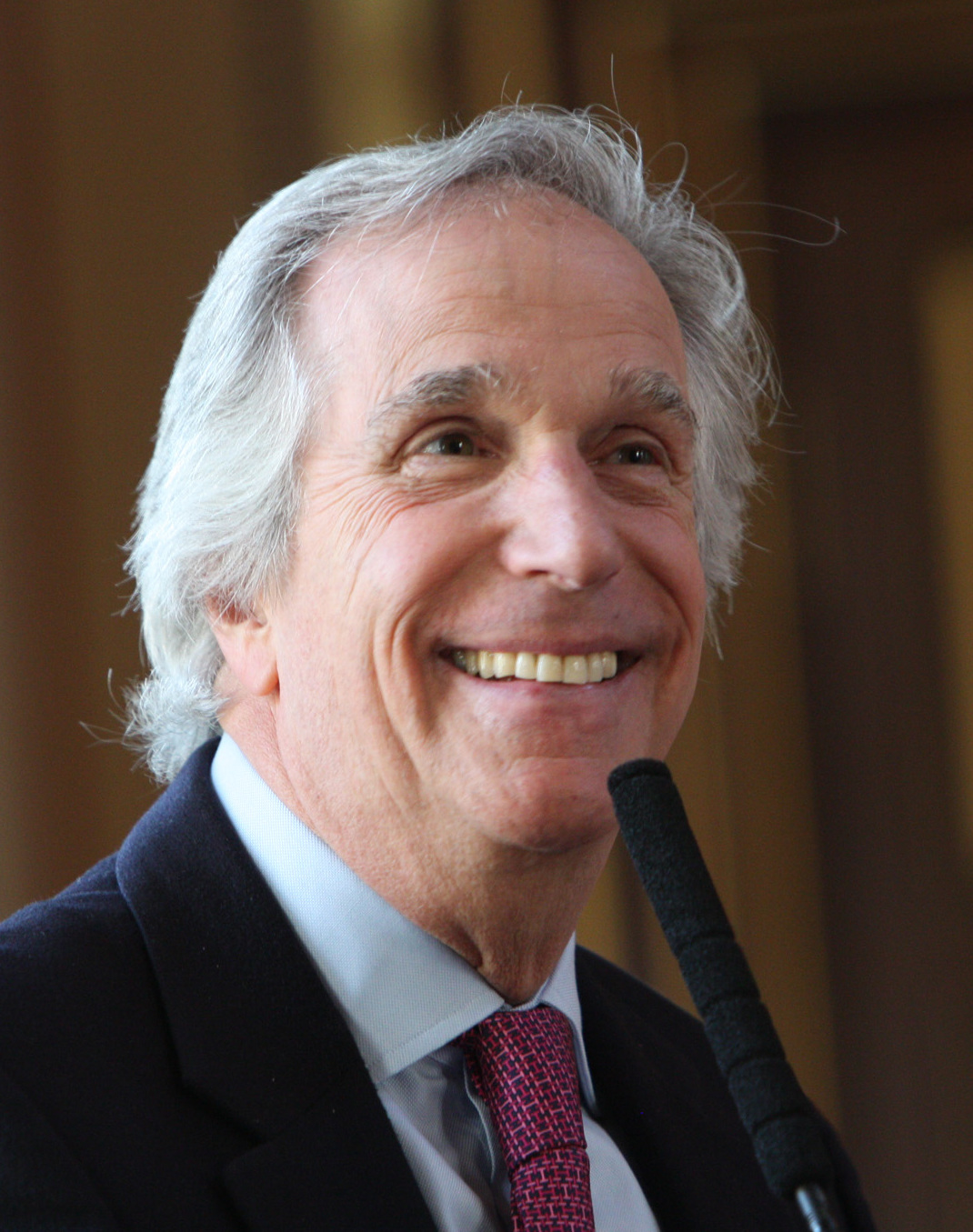
Henry Winkler

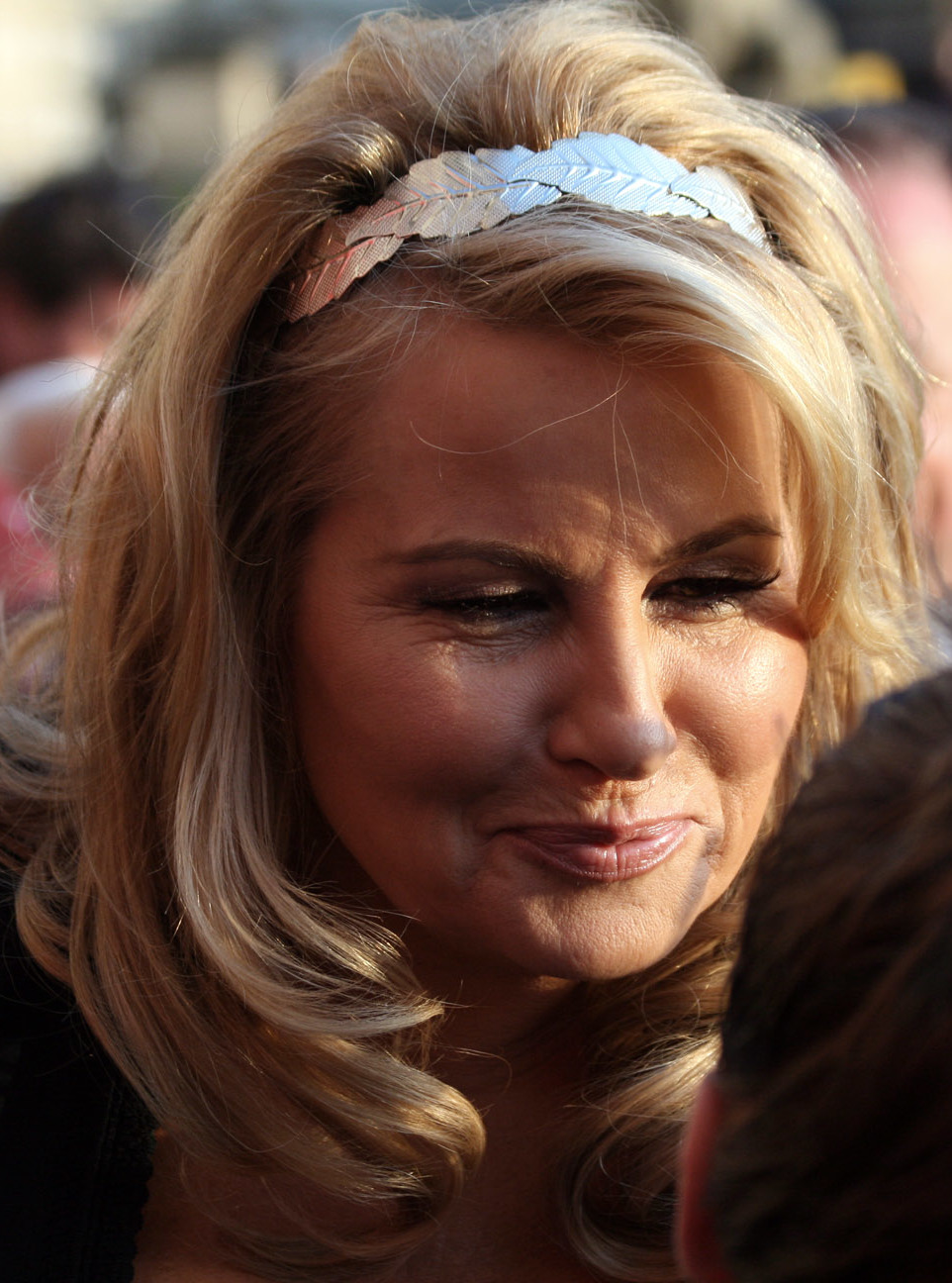
Jennifer Coolidge

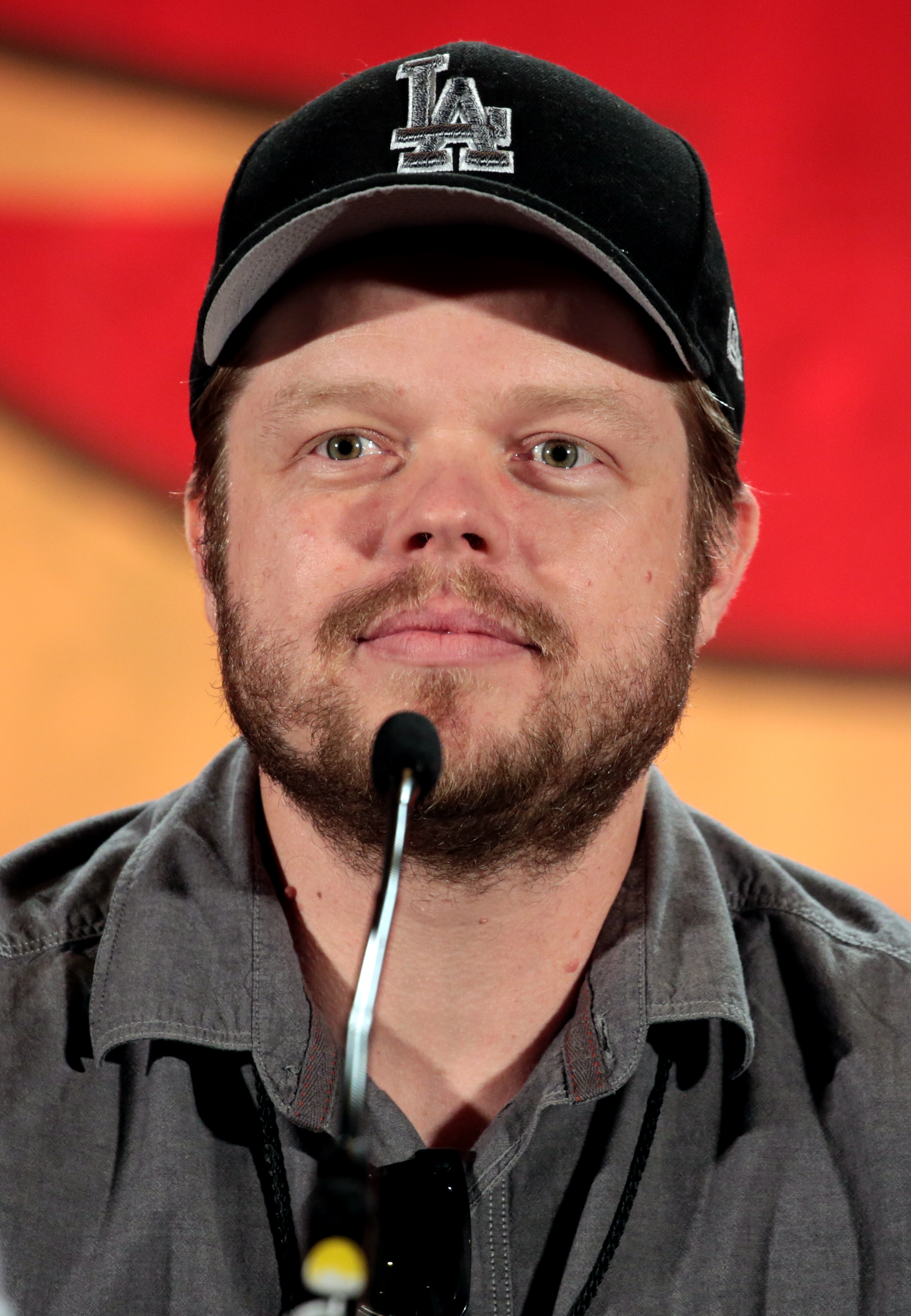
Elden Henson

- Mary Kay Adams, actress, known for work on Guiding Light and Babylon 5
- Pearl Aday, singer
- Landry Allbright, actress
- Anania (2022), internet personality and actress
- Michael Angelakos, singer-songwriter known for Passion Pit
- Anthony Atamanuik (1997), actor, comedian, and Donald Trump impressionist
- Sarah Borges (1990), singer-songwriter
- Glenn Branca, avant garde composer and guitarist
- Bill Burr (1993), comedian and actor
- Kerem Bürsin, television actor
- Tim Burton, saxophonist for The Mighty Mighty Bosstones
- Mario Cantone (1982), actor and comedian
- Ian Cardoni (2012), actor and voice talent; current voice of "Rick" on Adult Swim's Rick and Morty
- Anthony Clark (1986), television actor, known for Yes, Dear
- Bonnie Comley (MA, 1994), Tony Award-winning theater producer
- Jennifer Coolidge, actress and comedian, known for American Pie and The White Lotus
- Billy Costa, radio personality
- Michael Cyril Creighton (2001), actor known for Only Murders in the Building
- David Cross (did not graduate), actor and comedian, known for Mr. Show and Arrested Development
- Gabe Dunn (2009), podcaster and writer known for Just Between Us and Bad with Money
- Richard Dysart (BS 1956, MS 1981), actor, known for L.A. Law
- Joely Fisher (did not graduate), actress
- Gina Gershon (did not graduate), actress
- Natalie Gold, actress known for Succession
- Spalding Gray (1965), actor and performance artist
- Adam Green (did not graduate), musician known for The Moldy Peaches
- Louise Closser Hale, actress and playwright
- Elden Henson (did not graduate), actor known for Daredevil
- Eric Hutchinson, singer-songwriter
- Abbi Jacobson (did not graduate), actress and comedian known for Broad City
- Jen Kirkman, comedian and podcaster
- Paul Kreppel (1969), actor and theatre producer
- Denis Leary (1979), comedian and actor
- Brandon Lee (did not graduate), actor and martial artist known for The Crow
- Jay Leno (1973), comedian and talk show host
- Jack Lepiarz (2010), circus performer and former WBUR anchor
- Dev Lemons, singer-songwriter and record producer
- Dan Levy (2003), comedian
- Sunita Mani (2008), actress
- Andrea Martin (1969), actress and comedian
- Matt McGorry (2008), actor known for Orange Is the New Black
- Shelley Mitchell (did not graduate), actress and performance coach
- Lance Norris, actor and comedian
- Michael Nouri, actor known for Flashdance
- Morgan Page, music producer
- Eddie Palladino (1979), announcer for the Boston Celtics
- Don Pardo (1942), television personality
- Penny Peyser (1973), film and television actress
- Chrystee Pharris (1998), actress known for Passions
- Eugene Roche (1953), television actor
- Hartley Sawyer (2007), actor known for CW's The Flash
- Iliza Shlesinger (2005), comedian and actress
- Emily Skeggs (2012), actress known for Fun Home
- Arleen Sorkin (1977), actress, screenwriter, television presenter and comedian known for voicing Harley Quinn
- Michael Grant Terry, actor known for Bones
- Natasha Gregson Wagner (did not graduate), actress
- George Watsky (2010), poet and rapper
- Justin Willman (2002), television personality
- Henry Winkler (1967), actor known for Happy Days and Barry
- Gene Wood, television personality and game show host
- Steven Wright (1978), comedian
- Elisha Yaffe (2007), television actor

=== Literature ===
- Mary P. Burrill (1904), playwright of the Harlem Renaissance
- Gerry Duggan (1996), comic book writer for Marvel Comics
- Denise Duhamel (1984), poet
- Jack Gantos (1976), children's book writer
- Seth Grahame-Smith (1998), novelist and screenwriter
- Jody Houser (MFA), comic book writer
- Don Lee (MFA, faculty), fiction writer and former editor of the literary journal Ploughshares
- Thomas Lux (1970), poet and academic
- Chris Lynch (MA), YA novelist
- Carl Menninger (MA), stage director and playwright
- Erik Mona, writer known for Dungeons & Dragons game magazines
- Porsha Olayiwola (MFA, 2022, faculty), poet laureate of Boston
- Joe Randazzo (2002), comedy writer known for The Onion
- Taylor Jenkins Reid (2005), novelist known for The Seven Husbands of Evelyn Hugo
- Kim Roberts (1984), poet
- Olen Steinhauer (MFA, 1999), television producer and spy novelist
- Laurie Faria Stolarz (MFA), YA novelist
- Cecilia Tan (MA, 1994), writer, publisher, and founder of Circlet Press
- Laura van den Berg (MFA, 2008), author
- Nicola Yoon (MA, 1999), YA novelist known for Everything, Everything

=== Journalism ===
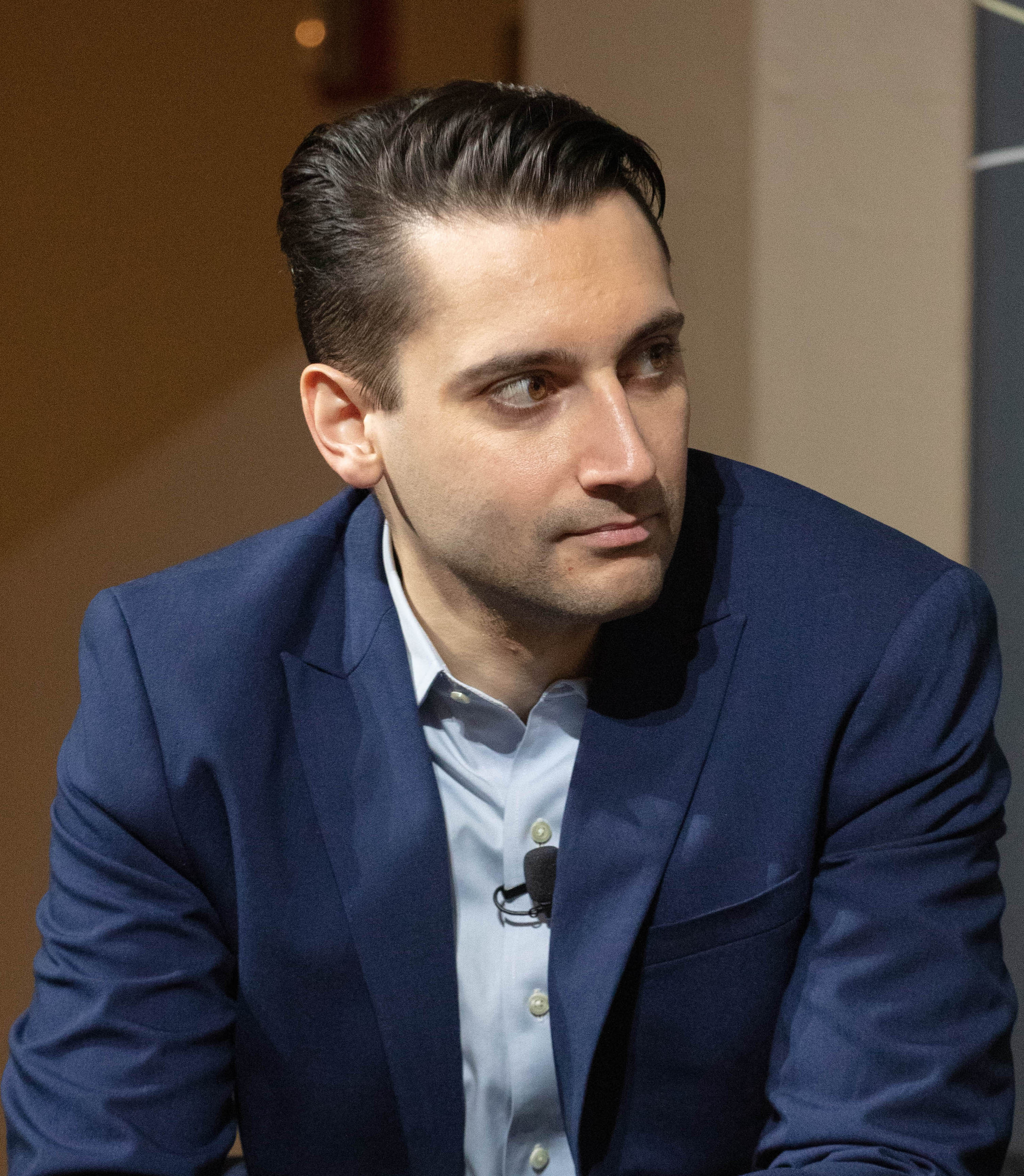
Ben Collins

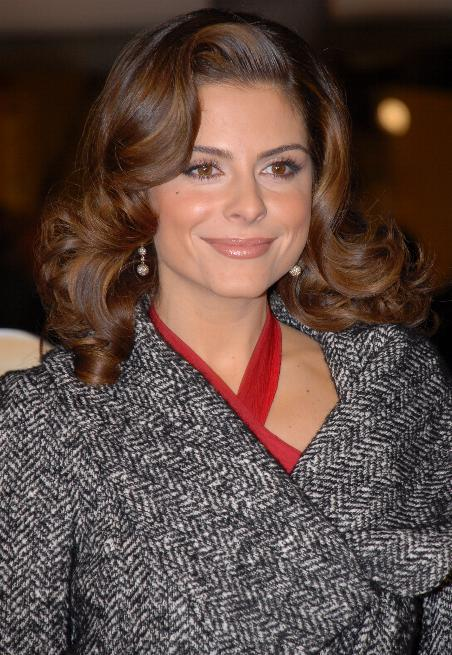
Maria Menounos

- Julie Banderas (1996), television news correspondent and anchor for Fox News
- Veronica Belmont (2004), technology journalist and media personality
- Steve Berthiaume (1987), sportscaster for the Arizona Diamondbacks
- Warren Bobrow (1985), culinary writer and chef
- Jared Bowen (1998), reporter and editor at WGBH-TV
- Ben Collins (2010), reporter for NBC News and The Daily Beast
- Morton Dean (1957), television correspondent and anchor, known for CBS Evening News and Good Morning America
- Greg Dickerson, sideline reporter for the Boston Celtics
- Frank Fixaris (1956), broadcast reporter and anchor at WGME-TV
- Al Jaffe (1968), broadcast producer and executive
- Mike Joy, sportscaster for NASCAR
- Wayne Larrivee (1977), sports broadcaster for the Green Bay Packers
- Gene Lavanchy (1986), reporter and anchor for WFXT Boston 25
- Dion Lim (2006), television anchor for KGO-TV
- Leslie Marshall, journalist and talk radio host
- Maria Menounos (2000), entertainment journalist and media personality
- Tim Neverett (1988), sportscaster for the Los Angeles Dodgers
- Josh Pahigian (MFA, 2001), baseball sportswriter
- Anaridis Rodriguez (2011), television correspondent anchor for WBZ-TV
- Matt Shearer (2009), reporter for WBZ NewsRadio
- Lauren Sherman (2004), fashion writer
- Katya Soldak (2003), journalist and editor for Forbes
- Matt Spiegel (1992), sports broadcaster
- Kristin Tate, libertarian columnist and commentator
- Susan Wornick (1971), television reporter and anchor

=== Business ===
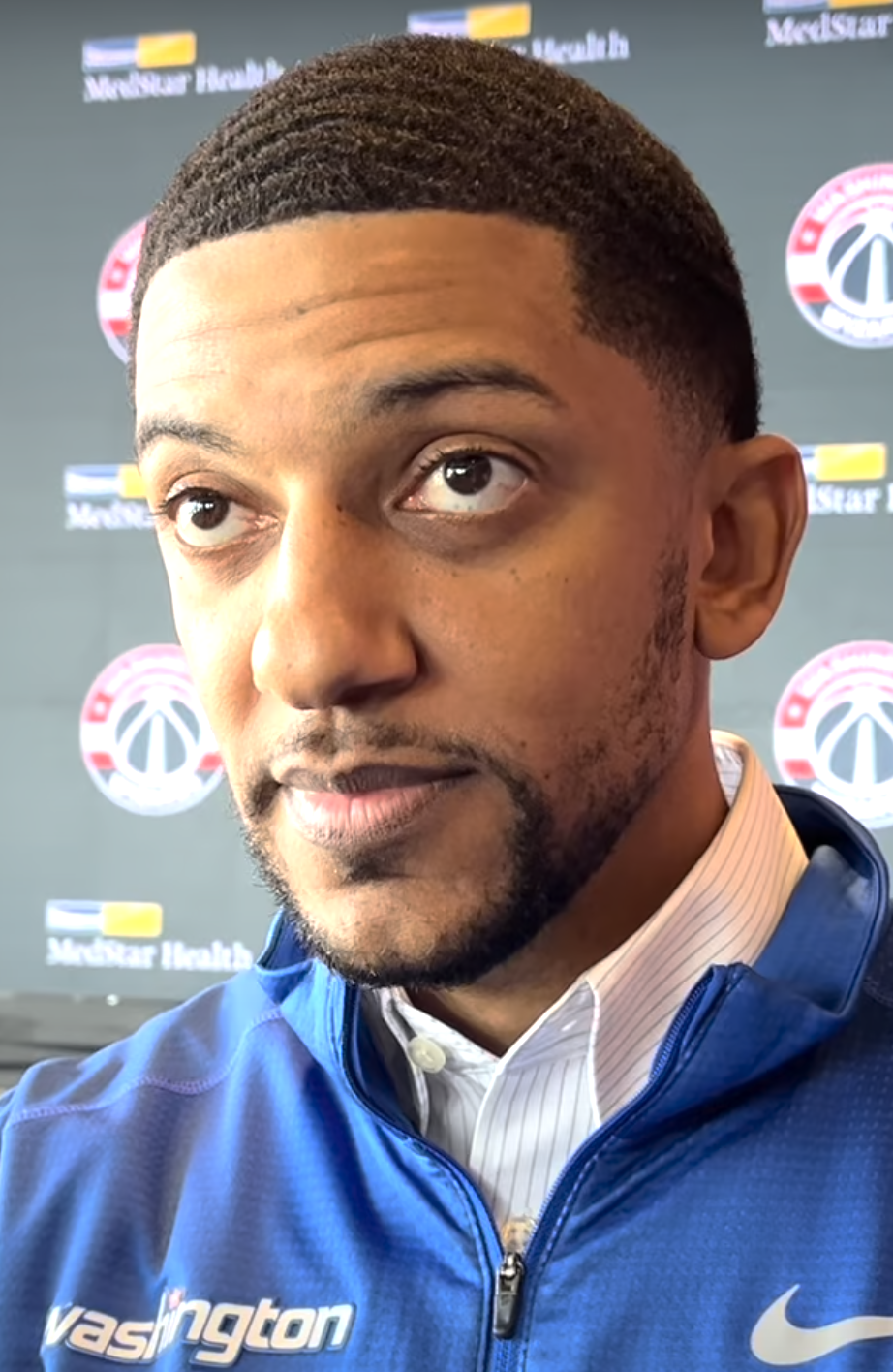
Will Dawkins

- Benjamin Bronfman (did not graduate), environmentalist and entrepreneur
- Bobbi Brown (1979), make-up artist and entrepreneur
- Will Dawkins (2008), basketball executive and general manager of the Washington Wizards
- Ada Crogman Franklin, newspaper publisher
- Marian Goodman, art dealer
- Rob Hennigan (2004), basketball executive and former general manager of the Orlando Magic
- Jayceeoh (2004), music producer and DJ
- Sam Presti (2000), basketball executive and general manager of the Oklahoma City Thunder
- Sara Weeks Roberts, president of the National Library for the Blind
- Wishnutama (took courses), Indonesian executive

=== Academia ===
- Elma Lewis (1943), arts educator and founder of the National Center of Afro-American Artists
- Guy McElroy (1975), art historian
- Henry Lawrence Southwick, second president of Emerson College
- Jessie Eldridge Southwick, actress, author, and Emerson College professor

=== Politics ===
- Elspeth B. Cypher (1980), associate justice of the Massachusetts Supreme Judicial Court
- Susan Del Percio, political strategist
- Jaclyn Friedman (MFA, 2004), feminist activist
- Doris Haddock (honorary degree, did not graduate), campaign finance reform activist
- Chris Hurst (2009), activist and member of the Virginia House of Delegates
- Hussein Ibish (1986), Arab-American activist and scholar
- Suzan Johnson Cook (1976), political advisor and pastor
- Gaynelle Griffin Jones (1969), former U.S. attorney for the Southern District of Texas
- Katherine G. Langley, member of the U.S. House of Representatives from Kentucky
- Julie Mayberry, member of the Arkansas House of Representatives
- Peter Meade (1970), head of the Boston Redevelopment Authority under Mayor Thomas Menino
- Alice Moore Hubbard, feminist writer and suffragette
- Elaine Noble (MS, 1970), member of the Massachusetts House of Representatives
- Jerry Parisella (1988), member of the Massachusetts House of Representatives
- Michael Rulli (1991), member of the U.S. House of Representatives from Ohio
- Kotaro Tatsumi, Japanese politician and member of the Japanese House of Representatives from Osaka

=== Sports ===
- Geoffrey Gray (2019), basketball player in the Israeli Basketball Premier League
- Skip Lockwood (1976), Major League Baseball pitcher
- Jessie Ward (2007), professional wrestler and television producer

=== Visual arts ===
- Derek Paul Jack Boyle, visual artist
- Ken Fallin (1974), illustrator and cartoonist
- Spencer Tunick (1988), photographer

=== Miscellaneous ===
- Princess Noor bint Asem (2004), member of the Jordanian royal family
- Princess Sarah bint Asem (BA, 2000, MA, 2002), member of the Jordanian royal family
- James Parry, internet personality and comedian

=== Fictional alumni ===
- Nancy Wheeler, from the television series Stranger Things
- Zach Stone, as portrayed by Bo Burnham, from the television series "Zach Stone Is Gonna Be Famous"

== Faculty ==
- Jonathan Aaron (1988–present), poet
- David Akiba, photographer
- Jay Baron Nicorvo, poet and essayist
- Melia Bensussen (2000–present), theater director
- Sven Birkerts, literary critic
- Benjamin Bolger, perpetual student
- Tony Cennamo, radio host and disc jockey and host
- Helen Chasin, poet
- Samuel James Cornish, poet
- Rashin Fahandej, artist
- Jim Finn, independent filmmaker
- Andy Fish, artist, writer, and graphic novelist
- Ted Gup, writer and journalist
- Alden Jones, writer
- Bavand Karim, screenwriter and filmmaker
- Michael W. King, filmmaker and music video producer
- Bill Knott, poet
- Kristin Linklater (1990–1996), vocal coach and author
- Tim Riley, music journalist and critic
- Beena Sarwar, journalist and activist
- Jeffrey L. Seglin (1999–2011), columnist
- David Foster Wallace, novelist and essayist

=== Presidents ===
- Charles Wesley Emerson, founder and first president
- Jacqueline Liebergott, president 1992–2011
- M. Lee Pelton, president 2011–2021
- Jay Bernhardt, president 2023–
