= Devotion (1931 film) =

1931 film

- Theatrical poster for the film
- Directed by: Robert Milton
- Screenplay by: Horace Jackson; Graham John
- Based on: A Little Flat in the Temple; 1930 novel by Pamela Wynne
- Produced by: Charles R. Rogers
- Starring: Ann Harding; Leslie Howard
- Cinematography: Hal Mohr
- Edited by: Daniel Mandell
- Music by: Arthur Lange
- Production company: RKO Studios
- Distributed by: RKO Studios
- Release date: September 25, 1931
- Running time: 80-84 minutes
- Country: United States
- Language: English
- Budget: $394,000
- Box office: $542,000

Devotion is a 1931 American pre-Code romantic drama film starring Ann Harding and Leslie Howard based on the 1930 Pamela Wynne novel A Little Flat in the Temple. Its plot involves a woman who disguises herself and gains employment in the home of the man she loves.

== Plot ==
Shirley Mortimer is one of three adult daughters of a wealthy Bloomsbury family, who view her as plain and boring and treat her as little more than a servant. When her father's friend barrister David Trent comes for tea, she is instantly smitten. David asks the Mortimers if they can recommend a nursery governess for his son, Derek. Because she will have to live in his flat, she must be middle-aged and therefore above reproach.

With the help of her friend, Marjory, Shirley uses a dark wig and old fashioned clothing to disguise herself as Mrs. Halifax, a middle-aged Cockney widow with four children. Mrs. Halifax passes muster with Mrs. Coggins, the housekeeper who rules the roost (and her husband and 8 children) at David's Temple flat. When Derek likes Mrs. Halifax, that is enough for David.

David is exhausting himself while defending painter Norman Harrington on the charge of murdering his wife. As Mrs. Halifax, Shirley wins the love of David's son and dotes on David, making sure he takes care of himself. One night, after saying his bedtime prayers, Derek reveals that his mother is “in Heaven already.’

In a conversation with Arthur about their defense of Harrington, David points out that Harrington's wife was a dipsomaniac, a manipulative alcoholic who might have killed him—or more probably herself. He knows the type too well from his own wife,

Harrington is acquitted, and upon meeting Mrs. Halifax, notices a blonde curl peeking out from under her wig. Although she fixes it, it is too late. He sketches a supposedly random picture of a girl and gives it to David. It is unmistakably Shirley. Harrington asks to paint Mrs. Halifax. Later, David smiles as he looks at the sketch and eagerly accepts a dinner invitation from Shirley's father, at the Plaza.

At his studio, Harrington tells Mrs. Halifax that she is a bad make-up artist. He thinks she and Trent have been lovers: She denies it, emphatically. He promises to keep her secret.

Mortimer brings Shirley with him to the Plaza. While she and David are dancing after dinner, a woman glares at them, unseen. She tells the man with her that she is staring at her husband, whom she has not seen for 4 years. David, now smitten himself, keeps dancing after the music stops.

Shirley rushes home without taking time to change, throwing Mrs. Halifax's hat and cloak over her evening dress. David is waiting. He tells Shirley that he has fallen deeply in love with her. and reluctantly adds that she must go home.

The next evening, in his apartment, they have dinner, punctuated by loving looks and kisses. He starts to tell her about his wife—who walks in on them. She has come for more money, and is delighted to see that she will be able to get more than she expected. Assuming the worst, Shirley leaves.

Shirley becomes a highly paid model for Harrington, who paints her in a beautiful period gown. She denies loving Trent—or Harrington—and only wants to get far away.

David drops in on Harrington, who tells him that Shirley and he are to marry. However, rather than asking her to marry him, Harrington proposes that they travel the world together, with Shirley as his mistress. Laughing, Shirley returns to her family home and her servitude there.

A month later, Harrington turns up at the Mortimer home at teatime. This time, he refers to their marriage in front of witnesses. David arrives and soon reveals to everyone that he had not seen his wife for four years and that he expects the divorce to go through quickly. Shirley steps aside, whispering to Marjory. Her mother demands to know what they are saying.... David steps into the foreground. “You need a lawyer, don't you, Mrs. Halifax?” “Oh, Give over Mr. Trent,” she replies. Fadeout as they lean into a kiss.

== Cast ==
- Ann Harding as Shirley Mortimer
- Leslie Howard as David Trent
- Robert Williams as Norman Harrington
- O.P. Heggie as Emmet Mortimer
- Louise Closser Hale as Mrs. Mortimer
- Dudley Digges as Sergeant Herbert Coggins
- Alison Skipworth as Mrs. Matilda Coggins
- Doris Lloyd as Pansy
- Olive Tell as Mrs. Trent
- Claude King as Arthur, Trent's colleague
- Joan Carr as Marjory Fielding
- Douglas Scott as Derek Trent
- Ruth Weston as Margaret Mortimer
- Unidentified actress as Mortimer daughter married to a railroad executive

== Production ==
The working titles for this film were A Little Flat in the Temple and Alias Mrs. Halifax.

Between this film and the success of Platinum Blonde, released later the same year, Robert Williams' star was in the ascendant, but he died of peritonitis after surgery for acute appendicitis only three days after the release of Platinum Blonde.

== Reception ==
Writing for the October 3, 1931 edition of The New York Times, Mordaunt Hall calls the film “quite a pleasing entertainment,” although he finds the title of the book, A Little Flat in the Temple, ” far more suitable”. He praises the “excellent cast, headed by the radiant and talented Ann Harding,…Mr. Howard rivals Miss Harding in acting, the portrayals of both being gratifyingly restrained and agreeably sympathetic.” He gives supporting players high but somewhat redundant praise, citing both Dudley Digges and young Douglas Scott for their “capital” performances. Although the film does not reveal the truth about the Harrington case, Hall assumes that he did kill his wife, and baulks at the way that is handled. “One would imagine he had done nothing more than box his wife's ears.”

According to RKO records the film lost $40,000 at the box office.
