= Rashin (given name) =

Rashin is a unisex given name. Notable people with the name include:

- Rashin Fahandej, Iranian-American artist
- Rashin Kheiriyeh, Iranian-American writer and illustrator
- Rashin Rahman, Indian actor
- Rashin Wurie (born 1972), Sierra Leonean football midfielder
