= Anthony Seymour =

Anthony Seymour may refer to:

- Anthony Seymour, son of John Seymour (1474–1536)
- Anthony Seymour, character in Dangerous Innocence

== See also ==
- Tony Seymour (disambiguation)
