= Tony Seymour =

Tony Seymour may refer to:

- Tony Seymour, character in Ann's An Idiot
- Tony Seymour, character in Accused (film)

== See also ==
- Anthony Seymour (disambiguation)
