= Horace Jackson =

American film director (1898–1952)

- Born: Horace Atherton Jackson; March 29, 1898; Either East St. Louis or Venice Illinois, United States
- Died: January 26, 1952 (aged 53); Los Angeles, California, United States
- Occupations: Screenwriter, set designer
- Years active: 1923–1941
- Spouse: Gertrude Jackson

Horace Jackson (March 29, 1898 – January 26, 1952) was an American Academy Award-nominated screenwriter of the silent and sound film eras. Jackson also worked as a set designer early in his career.

== Life and career ==
Born Horace Atherton Jackson on March 29, 1898, to Harry S. Jackson and Lena Atherton Jackson in Illinois. There are conflicting sources as to whether he was born in East St. Louis or Venice, Illinois, both suburbs of St. Louis, Missouri. His father died when he was five, and several years later his mother moved him and his sister, Helen, to the Boyle Heights area of Los Angeles in approximately 1910. Prior to working in films, Jackson was an architect.

Jackson broke into the film industry dressing sets on the 1923 silent film, The Unknown Purple. Within months, he had moved up to the title of either "art director" or "set director". He would be the co-set director on the 1925 classic, Ben-Hur. He continued in the set design arena during the remainder of silent era, however with the advent of talking pictures Jackson would move into the screenwriting profession. His first effort was the screenplay adaptation of Benjamin Glazer and Melchior Lengyel's story for 1929's Strange Cargo, directed by Arthur Gregor.

During 1929 through the beginning of the 1940s, Jackson would be the screenwriter or story creator on almost 30 films. Some of his better known films are: Sin Takes a Holiday in 1930; 1937's Breakfast for Two, starring Barbara Stanwyck; and his final two films in 1941, Model Wife (starring Joan Blondell and Dick Powell), and Bedtime Story with Fredric March and Loretta Young. Holiday, Jackson's adaptation of Philip Barry's 1928 play of the same name, would be honored with an Academy Award nomination at the 4th Academy Awards in 1932, however, he lost to the big winner of those awards, Cimarron (written by Howard Estabrook).

He was also reported as one of a plethora of writers who worked on the screenplay for the 1942 film The Night Before the Divorce, although he received no screenplay credit. In 1947, he sued Republic Pictures for plagiarism regarding the film Calendar Girl (1947). According to a 1949 New York Times article, Jackson and his writing partner, Irene Homer, were successful in their suit, receiving a "substantial sum".

On January 26, 1952, Jackson would die in a car accident.

== Filmography ==
(as per AFI's database)

Year	Title	Position	Silent (S)/Talkie (T)	Notes
1923	The Unknown Purple	Set dressings	S	
1923	Fashion Row	Art direction	S	
1923	The Drums of Jeopardy	Art direction	S	
1926	The Sporting Lover	Art direction	S	
1928	Lilac Time	Art direction	S	
1929	The Divine Lady	Art direction	S	
1929	The Awful Truth	Screenplay	T	
1929	Paris Bound	Screenplay	T	
1929	Strange Cargo	Screenplay	T	
1929	This Thing Called Love	Screenplay	T	
1930	Holiday	Screenplay	T	Nominated for Oscar for best screenplay
1930	The Lottery Bride	Screenplay	T	
1930	Sin Takes a Holiday	Screenplay	T	
1931	Beyond Victory	Screenplay (with James Gleason)	T	
1931	Devotion	Screenplay (with Graham John)	T	
1931	The Common Law	Screenplay (with John Farrow)	T	
1931	Rebound	Screenplay	T	
1932	Lady with a Past	Screenplay	T	
1932	The Animal Kingdom	Screenplay	T	
1932	A Woman Commands	Screenplay	T	
1933	Dangerously Yours	Screenplay	T	
1933	I Loved You Wednesday	Screenplay (with Philip Klein)	T	
1933	Pleasure Cruise	Screenplay (with Guy Bolton)	T	
1934	Bolero	Screenplay (with Guy Bolton)	T	
1934	We're Not Dressing	Screenplay (with George Marion Jr. and Benjamin Glazer)	T	
1935	Biography of a Bachelor Girl	Screenplay (with Anita Loos)	T	
1935	No More Ladies	Screenplay (with Donald Ogden Stewart)	T	
1935	Dressed to Thrill	Screenplay (with Samson Raphaelson)	T	
1936	The Unguarded Hour	Screenplay (with Howard Emmett Rogers and Leon Gordon)	T	
1936	Suzy	Screenplay (with Dorothy Parker, Lenore Coffee and Alan Campbell)	T	
1937	Breakfast for Two	Screenplay (with 6 others)	T	
1938	Women Are Like That	Screenplay	T	
1938	Men Are Such Fools	Screenplay (with Norman Reilly Raine)	T	
1941	Bedtime Story	Story (with Grant Garrett)	T	
1941	Model Wife	Screenplay (with Grant Garrett and Charles Kaufman)	T	
