= Women Are Like That (1938 film) =

1938 film by Stanley Logan

- Directed by: Stanley Logan
- Screenplay by: Horace Jackson
- Based on: Return from Limbo; 1936 in The Saturday Evening Post by A. H. Z. Carr
- Produced by: Robert Lord
- Starring: Kay Francis; Pat O'Brien; Ralph Forbes; Melville Cooper; Thurston Hall; Grant Mitchell
- Cinematography: Sidney Hickox
- Edited by: Thomas Richards
- Music by: Heinz Roemheld
- Production company: Warner Bros. Pictures
- Distributed by: Warner Bros. Pictures
- Release date: April 24, 1938
- Running time: 79 minutes
- Country: United States
- Language: English

Women Are Like That is a 1938 American drama film directed by Stanley Logan and written by Horace Jackson. The film stars Kay Francis, Pat O'Brien, Ralph Forbes, Melville Cooper, Thurston Hall and Grant Mitchell. The film was released by Warner Bros. Pictures on April 24, 1938.

== Plot ==
Businesswoman Claire King is the daughter of a powerful advertising executive. When she marries humble copywriter Bill Landin, she wants to use her influence and connections to boost her husband's status and help him achieve success, but he resents her efforts.

The couple nearly separates, but eventually see the error of their ways.

== Cast ==
- Kay Francis as Claire Landin
- Pat O'Brien as Bill Landin
- Ralph Forbes as Martin Brush
- Melville Cooper as Mainwaring
- Thurston Hall as Claudius King
- Grant Mitchell as Mr. Snell
- Gordon Oliver as Howard Johns
- John Eldredge as Charles Braden
- Herbert Rawlinson as Avery Flickner
- Hugh O'Connell as George Dunlap
- Georgia Caine as Mrs. Amelia Brush
- Joyce Compton as Miss Hall
- Sarah Edwards as Mrs. Snell
- Josephine Whittell as Miss Douglas
- Loia Cheaney as Miss Perkins
- Edward Broadley as Holliwell
- Phyllis Clare as Mrs. Conroy
- George O'Hanlon as Page (uncredited)
