= Sin Takes a Holiday =

1930 film

- Film Poster
- Directed by: Paul L. Stein; E. J. Babille (assistant)
- Written by: Horace Jackson (screenplay); Robert Milton (story); Dorothy Cairns (story)
- Produced by: E. B. Derr
- Starring: Constance Bennett; Kenneth MacKenna; Basil Rathbone
- Cinematography: John Mescall
- Edited by: Daniel Mandell
- Music by: Francis Gromon
- Production company: Pathé Exchange
- Distributed by: RKO Radio Pictures
- Release date: November 10, 1930 (U.S.)
- Running time: 75 minutes
- Country: United States
- Language: English
- Budget: $450,000
- Box office: $623,000

Sin Takes a Holiday is a 1930 American pre-Code romantic comedy film, directed by Paul L. Stein, from a screenplay by Horace Jackson, based on a story by Robert Milton and Dorothy Cairns. It starred Constance Bennett, Kenneth MacKenna, and Basil Rathbone. Originally produced by Pathé Exchange and released in 1930, it was part of the takeover package when RKO Pictures acquired Pathé that year; it was re-released by RKO in 1931.

== Plot ==
Sin Takes a Holiday (1930)

Sylvia Brenner is a "plain" secretary sharing an apartment with two other women, one of whom is her friend Annie. Her economic condition is meager, but she makes do with what she has.

She works for a womanizing divorce attorney, Gaylord Stanton, who only dates married women; he has no intention of ever getting married and sees wives as safe, since they already have husbands.

But Sylvia is secretly in love with Gaylord. When the woman he is fooling around with, Grace Lawrence, decides to leave her husband in order to marry Gaylord, he panics. In order to avoid having to deal with the matrimonial pursuits of any of his potential dalliances, he offers a business proposal to Sylvia whereby he will provide her with financial remuneration if she will marry him in name only. She agrees.

After the sham wedding, Sylvia is sent off to Paris by Gaylord, to get her out of the way so he can continue his nightly debauchery. In Paris, she uses her money to do a serious makeover of herself. While there, she also meets her boss's old friend, Reggie Durant, who falls in love with her. Reggie is a sophisticated European, who introduces Sylvia to the enticements of the European lifestyle, to which she is attracted. When Reggie asks Sylvia to divorce Gaylord so that she can marry him, she is tempted, but confused, and returns home. Returning to the States, everyone takes notice of the transformed Sylvia.

Although there is a brief hiccup, as Grace puts forth a full-court offensive to win over Gaylord, Gaylord and Sylvia end up realizing that they are in love with each other.

== Cast ==
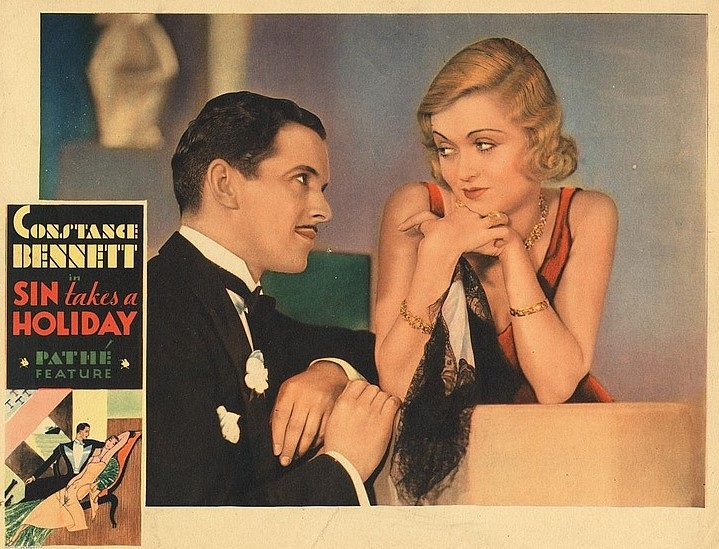
Lobby card with Kenneth MacKenna and Constance Bennett

- Constance Bennett as Sylvia Brenner
- Kenneth MacKenna as Gaylord Stanton
- Basil Rathbone as Reggie Durant
- Rita La Roy as Grace Lawrence
- Louis John Bartels as Richards
- John Roche as Sheridan
- Zasu Pitts as Annie
- Kendall Lee as Miss Munson
- Murrell Finley as Ruth
- Helen Johnson as Miss Graham
- Fred Walton as the butler

(Cast list as per the AFI database)

== Notes ==
On its original release, the movie recorded a loss of $40,000.

In 1958, the film entered the public domain in the United States because the claimants did not renew its copyright registration in the 28th year after publication.

The film was recorded using the RCA Photophone System.
