= Robert Williams (actor, born 1894) =

American actor (1894–1931)

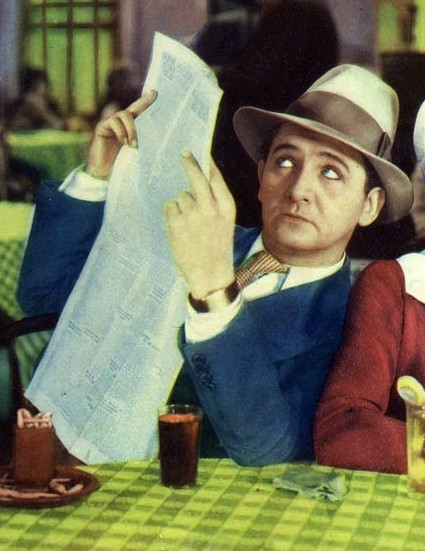
- Williams in Platinum Blonde (1931)
- Born: September 15, 1894; Morganton, North Carolina, U.S.
- Died: November 3, 1931 (aged 37); Hollywood, Los Angeles, California, U.S.
- Resting place: Forest Lawn Memorial Park, Glendale, California
- Occupation: Actor
- Years active: 1914–1931
- Spouses: Marion Harris (m. 1921; div. 1922) Alice Lake (m. 1924; div. 1925): Nina Penn
- Children: 1

Robert Williams (September 15, 1894 – November 3, 1931) was an American stage and film actor. He is best known for his first, and only, leading role in the 1931 romantic comedy Platinum Blonde, opposite Loretta Young and Jean Harlow. Williams died of peritonitis three days after the film's premiere.

== Career ==
Born in Morganton, North Carolina in 1894 (some sources state 1897 or 1899), Williams ran away from home at the age of 11 to join a tent show. He later worked on showboats in Mississippi before making his way to New York. After appearing in several stage productions, Williams landed a role in Eyes of Youth, starring Marjorie Rambeau. The role boosted his career and gained him notice. He put his career on hold to join the United States Army, where he served in the 166th Infantry Regiment during World War I. After the war, Williams returned to the United States and resumed his acting career. In 1922, he made his Broadway stage debut in the popular stage comedy Abie's Irish Rose. He also appeared in productions of That French Lady, Scarlet Pages, and Love, Honor and Betray.

After appearing as "Johnnie Coles" in the play Rebound in 1930, Williams was chosen by director Edward H. Griffith to reprise the role in the 1931 film version. He received favorable reviews for his work in the film and followed with a supporting role in Devotion, which was also released in 1931. He signed a long-term contract with the studio. Later that same year, Williams was cast in his first and only leading role in the romantic comedy film Platinum Blonde, starring Loretta Young and Jean Harlow. It was his final onscreen appearance.

== Personal life ==
Williams was married three times; his first marriage was to singer Marion Harris in 1921 with whom he had a daughter, Mary Ellen. Williams and Harris divorced in 1922. In March 1924, he married actress Alice Lake. They separated three times before divorcing in 1925. At the time of his death, Williams was married to actress Nina Penn.

== Death ==
On November 3, 1931, three days after the premiere of Platinum Blonde, Williams died of peritonitis at Hollywood Hospital after undergoing two operations for acute appendicitis the previous week. He had been scheduled to start a picture with Constance Bennett when he developed appendicitis.

Williams was buried in Forest Lawn Memorial Park in Glendale, California. He was survived by his wife Nina Penn Williams, daughter Mary Ellen, and cousin Mildred Brittain (nee Williams).

== Broadway credits ==
Date	Production	Role
May 23, 1922 – October 1, 1927	Abie's Irish Rose	Abraham Levy
December 22, 1924 – February 1925	Milgrim's Progress	Sam Milgrim
September 17 – September 1926	Kept	Norman Henderson
March 15 – April 1927	That French Lady	Fred Kraft
September 19 – October 1927	The Trial of Mary Dugan	Court Attendant
September 26, 1927 – April 1928	Jimmie's Women	Jimmie Turner
September 9 – November 1929	Scarlet Pages	Robert Lawrence
February 3 – May 1930	Rebound	Johnnie Coles
March 12 – April 1930	Love, Honor and Betray	The Young Man

== Filmography ==
Year	Title	Role	Notes
1914	The Vengeance of Winona	Kite – Black Dog's Accomplice	
1920	Thoughtless Women	The Son	
1928	Two Masters		
1931	The Common Law	Sam	
1931	Rebound	Johnnie Coles	
1931	Devotion	Norman Harrington	
1931	Platinum Blonde	Stew Smith	
