= Lily Watson =

English novelist

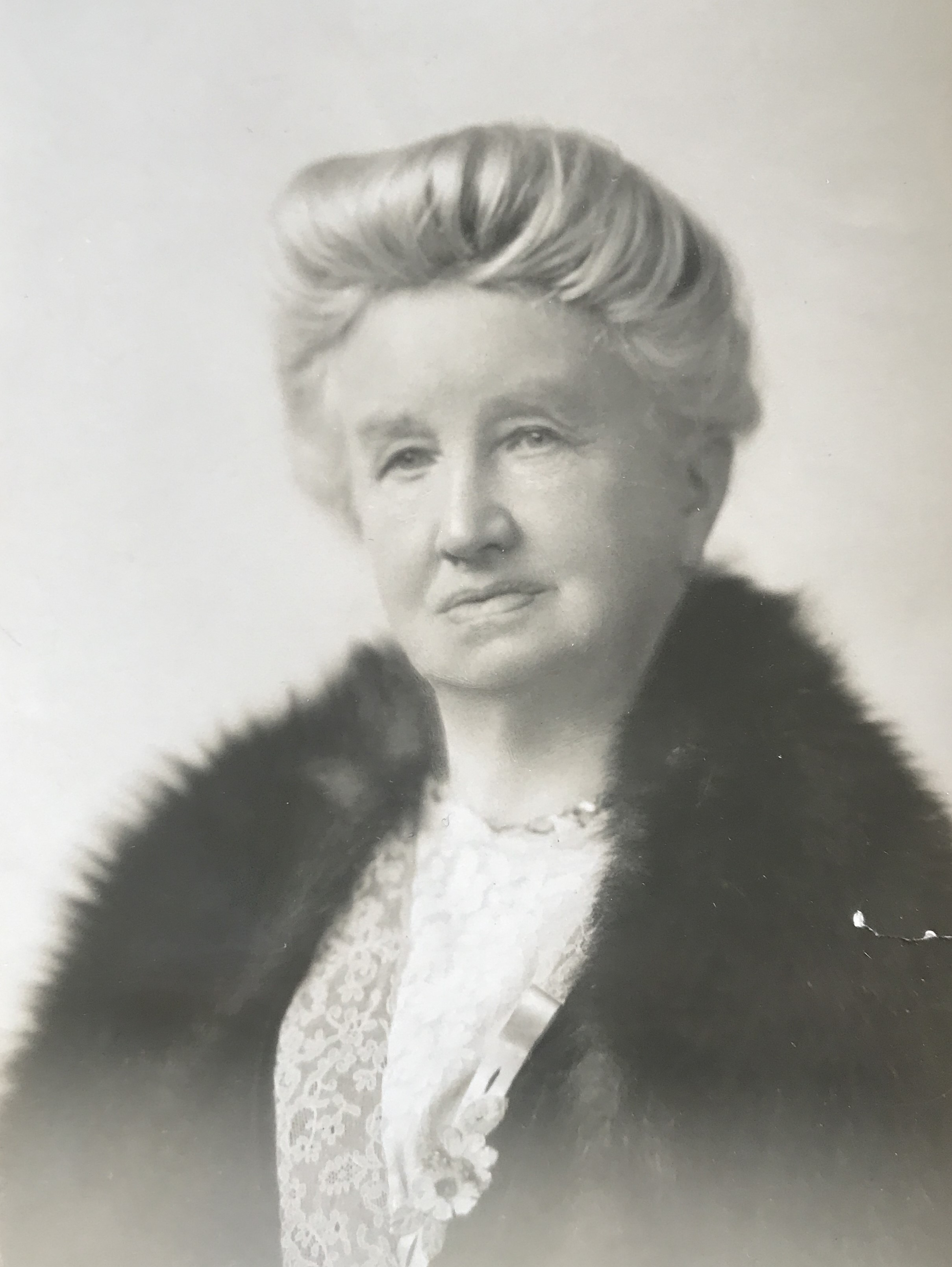
- Photo of Lily Watson
- Born: October 11, 1849; Taunton, Somerset
- Died: 1932 (aged 82–83)
- Relatives: Kate Mosse, great-granddaughter; Pamela Wynne, daughter

Lily Watson (October 11, 1849 – 1932) was an English novelist. Her best-selling novel The Vicar of Langthwaite was admired by William Ewart Gladstone, who wrote the foreword.

== Biography ==
Martha Louisa "Lily" Watson was born on 11 Oct 1849 in Taunton, Somerset. Her father was a Baptist minister Samuel Gosnell Green (1822–1905) who subsequently moved to teach classics and mathematics at the Horton Baptist Academy Watson's father joined the Religious Tract Society in 1876, and she wrote a number of works of fiction for them.

In 1873 she married Samuel Watson, a lawyer who lived in Streatham.

Her daughter Winnie also became a writer under the name Pamela Wynne.

Watson was largely forgotten in the second half of the 20th century. Interest in her was revived when novelist Kate Mosse found that Watson was her great-grandmother, which inspired her to write her 2022 book Warrior Queens & Quiet Revolutionaries.

== Works ==
Her works include:

- The Mountain Path (1888)
- Within Sight of the Snow: A Story of a Swiss Holiday, and A Surrey Idyll (1890)
- In the Days of Mozart: The Story of a Young Musician (1891)
- The Hill of Angels (1892)
- The Vicar of Langthwaite (3 volumes, 1893)
- A Fortunate Exile (1896)
- A Child of Genius (1898)

Within Sight of the Snow and A Child of Genius were also serialised in The Girl's Own Paper, a periodical to which she made over 90 contributions
