= Henry Lawrence Southwick =

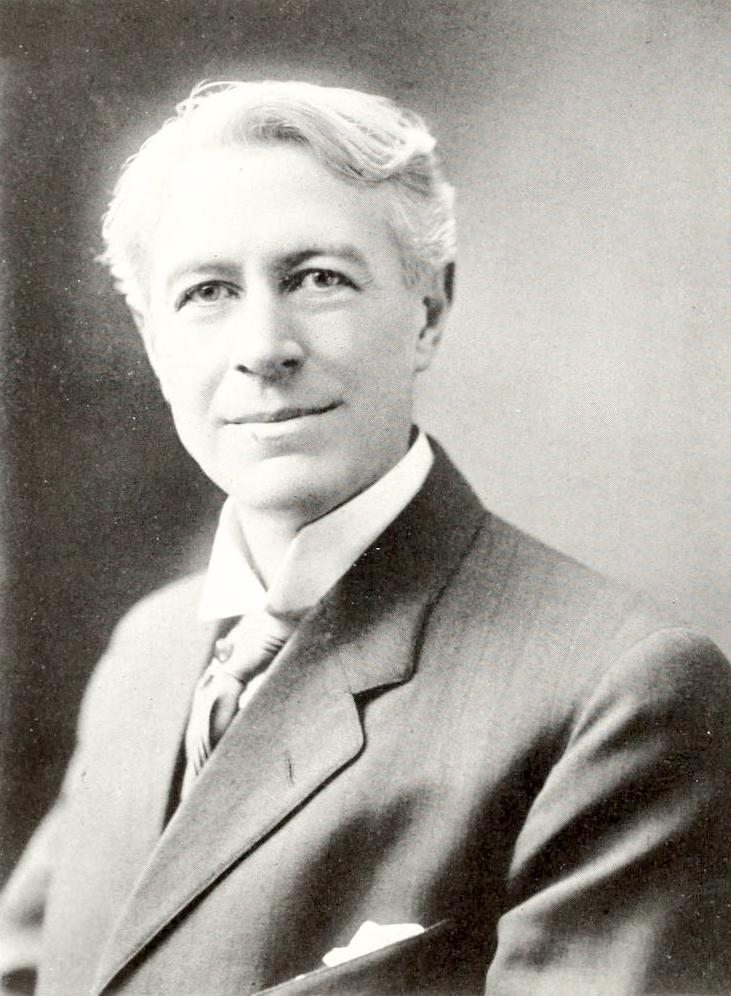
Henry Lawrence Southwick, 1918

Henry Lawrence Southwick (June 21, 1863 – December 30, 1932) was the third president of Emerson College of Oratory (now Emerson College), located in the Back Bay, Boston, Massachusetts. In addition to teaching at the college, he was a noted international performer of Shakespeare. With his wife, Jessie Eldridge Southwick, he created and directed The Southwick Recital Series, popular with contemporary literary audiences of Boston and continuing as an Emerson College event today.

== Life and career ==
Henry Lawrence Southwick was born in Boston on June 21, 1863. He graduated from Emerson College of Oratory in 1887, and became a financial partner of its founder, Charles Wesley Emerson, in 1889. He taught dramatics at the college and later formed a Shakespearean company composed of himself and Emerson students. In 1900, Henry and Jessie Southwick had joined with William H. Kenney to purchase the school from Charles Emerson. Referred to as Doctor Emerson and Dean Emerson, he served as Emerson's president from 1908 until his death on December 30, 1932.

He married Jessie Eldridge, a teacher at the college, in 1889 in Philadelphia, Pennsylvania. They had three daughters: Ruth (1893) who also taught at Emerson College; Mildred (Mrs. James E. Potter of Palm Springs, CA), (1895); and Jessie (1897).
