= Rebound (1931 film) =

1931 film

- Directed by: Edward H. Griffith
- Screenplay by: Horace Jackson
- Based on: Rebound by Arthur Hopkins; Donald Ogden Stewart
- Produced by: Charles R. Rogers
- Starring: Robert Ames; Ina Claire; Myrna Loy
- Cinematography: Norbert Brodine
- Edited by: Daniel Mandell
- Music by: Arthur Lange (uncredited)
- Production company: RKO Pathé Pictures
- Distributed by: RKO-Pathé Distributing
- Release dates: August 28, 1931 (Premiere-New York City); September 18, 1931 (U.S.)
- Running time: 89 minutes
- Country: United States
- Languages: English; French

Rebound is a 1931 American Pre-Code drama film starring Ina Claire, Robert Ames and Myrna Loy. Directed by Edward H. Griffith, the film is based on the play of the same name by Donald Ogden Stewart.

== Plot ==
Sara Jaffrey (Ina Claire) loves Bill Truesdale (Robert Ames), though he plans to marry Evie Lawrence (Myrna Loy). After Evie leaves Bill for a wealthy man, Sara and Bill marry, but Bill remains drawn to Evie. Humiliated by their continued closeness, Sara leaves Bill and seeks a divorce. Bill realizes he loves Sara and persuades her to reconcile with him.

== Cast ==
- Ina Claire as Sara Jaffrey
- Robert Ames as Bill Truesdale
- Myrna Loy as Evie Lawrence
- Hedda Hopper as Liz Crawford
- Robert Williams as Johnnie Coles
- Louise Closser Hale as Mrs. Jaffrey
- Walter Walker as Mr. Henry Jaffrey
- Hale Hamilton as Lyman Patterson
- Leigh Allen as Les Crawford
- Pierre D'Ennery as Gaston

(cast list as per American Film Institute database.)

== Reception ==
According to RKO records, the film recorded a loss of $215,000.
