= Jessie Eldridge Southwick =

American poet

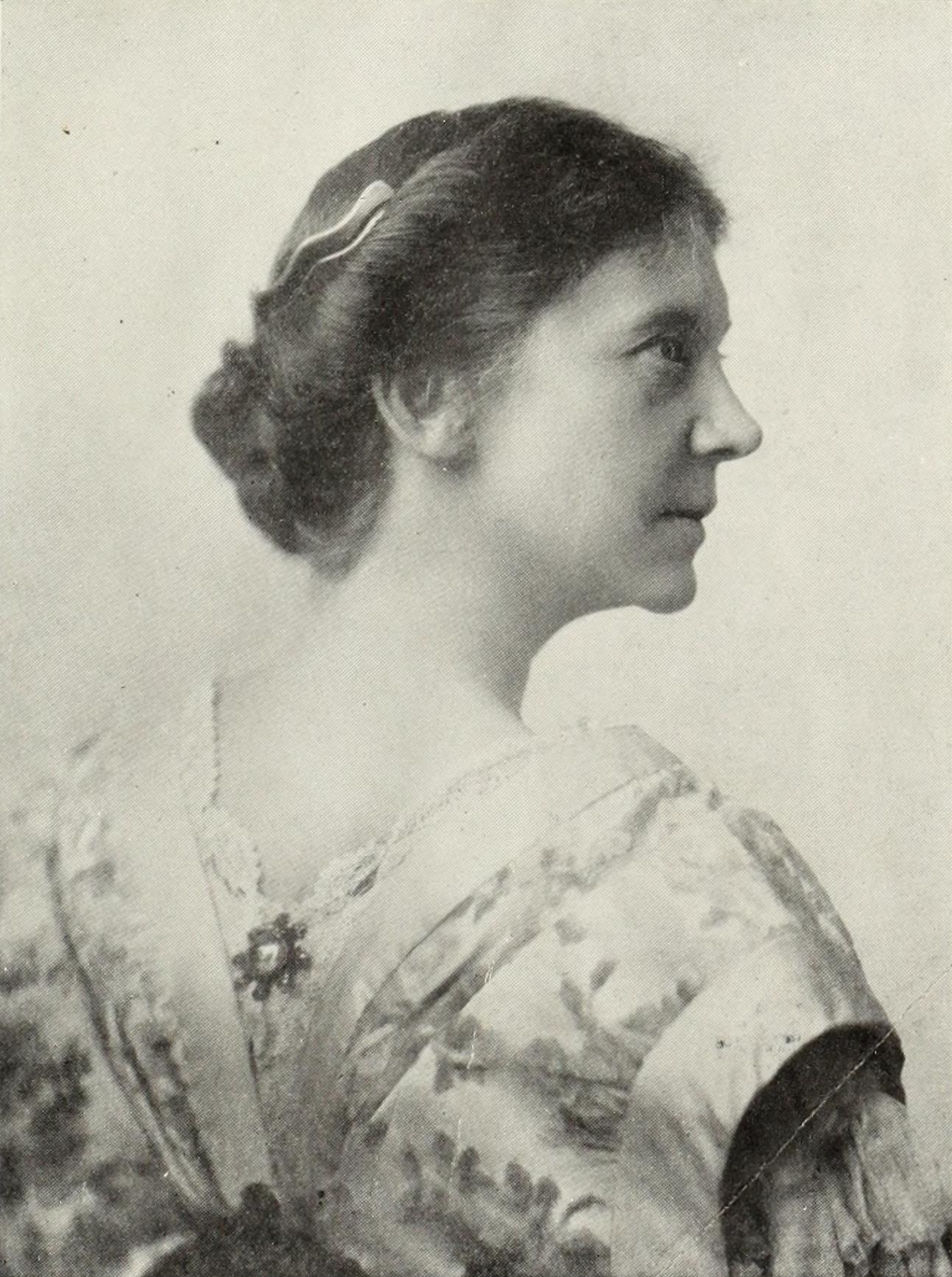
Jessie Eldridge Southwick c. 1910

Jessie Eldridge Southwick (1865 – 1957) was an American elocutionist, teacher, author, and poet. She was active in the Chautauqua and Lyceum movements of the late 19th and early 20th centuries, performing around the United States as well as internationally. She influenced oratory through active involvement in emerging organizations, writing textbooks, and teaching expressive voice culture and platform performance at Emerson College and elsewhere.

== Early life ==
Jessie Eldridge was born 1865 in Wilmington, Delaware, the daughter of Issachar Hoopes Eldridge of Philadelphia and Martha Gause of Chester County, Pennsylvania.

At age five, she moved with her family to Van Wert, Ohio, where she was home schooled by her mother. Southwick attended high school as well as Glendale Female College, near Cincinnati, followed by study with a private tutor, preparing to enter Vassar College. In 1880, however, she changed plans and enrolled in the New England Conservatory of Music, graduating from the oratory department in 1883. Concurrently, she attended Miss Johnson's private school, Newbury Street, Boston. Following graduation, she studied at Monroe Conservatory (later Emerson College of Oratory) graduating in 1885, and then took a two-year post-graduate course at the college and assisted teaching courses. She was awarded a master of oratory in 1886.

== Career ==
=== Teaching ===
Southwick taught at Emerson College of Oratory where she had studied. Starting as an assistant to the teacher in 1885, she became full-time faculty, teaching classes in Voice Culture, Dramatic Interpretation, Ethics, and Shakespeare. She held other teaching positions including assistant to Mary A. Currier in the oratory department at Wellesley College. On her own, as well as with her husband, she led courses at locations around Boston, in addition to programs across the country. She retired in 1935.

=== Professional affiliations ===
Southwick was active in early associations for the promotion of the field of elocution and oratory. In 1892 she was listed as a member attending the First National Convention of Public Readers and Teachers of Elocution. This organization changed its name to The National Association of Elocutionists, and eventually the National Association for the Advancement of Speech Arts. She held offices, presented topics at conferences, performed at sessions and joined discussions.

In 1909, The Lyceumite & Talent listed her as a member of the International Lyceum Association of America. Southwick's book Expressive Voice Culture is reviewed in the same issue.

In "1900, Henry and Jessie Southwick had joined with William H. Kenney to purchase the school from Charles Emerson" to become part owner of the college. In 1938, she was the first woman to be named to the board of Emerson College.

Southwick was a member of the New England Women's Press Association, the Delphian Society (president of the Alpha Chapter), the Boston Browning Society (executive committee), Music Lovers' Club, Professional Women's Club (charter and life member), Twentieth Century Club, the Boston Theosophical Society.

=== Performer ===
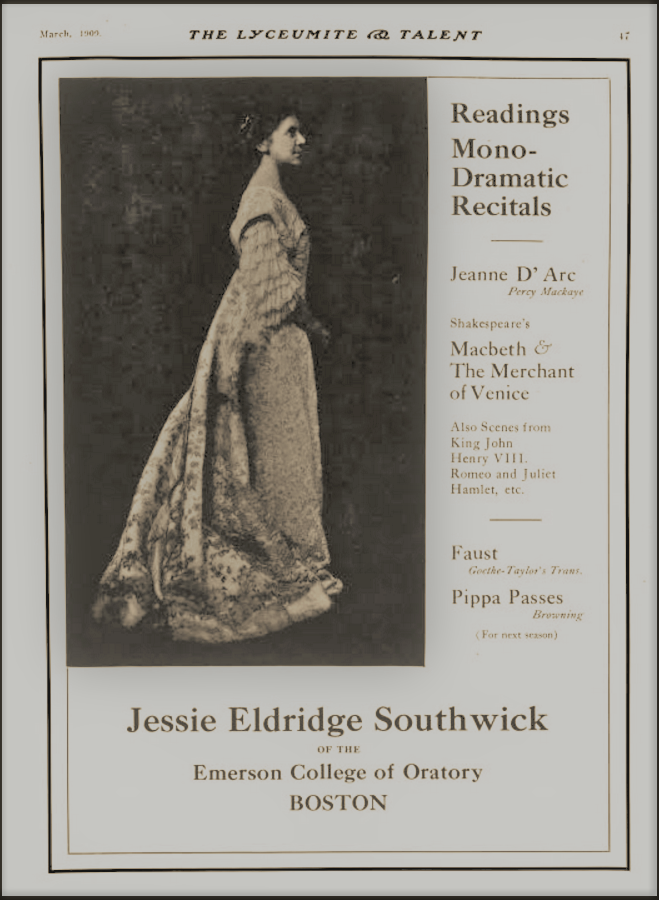
Promotional page for platform performance and list of her performance selections, 1909

At the First National Convention of Public Readers and Teachers of Elocution held at Columbia College from June 27 - July 2, 1892, Southwick attended as a member and recited "Nydia the Blind Girl of Pompeii" by Bulwer-Lytton at the close of the June 28 session.

Jessie Southwick performed around the country as a platform reader and received high praise for her work including reviews from the Boston Transcript as well as the Boston Times.

Her appearances included schools and colleges such as Wellesley and as far as Nebraska and Canada, with outstanding response:

"On Monday the citizens of Alberton enjoyed one of the choicest of literary treats, when Mrs Jessie Eldridge Southwick, the wife of the president of Emerson College of Oratory, Boston, interpreted Mackaye's historic and romantic drama, "Jeanne D'Arc." Mrs. Southwick was unassisted by other talent; but so many and varied were the characters and the emotions depicted that the interspersing of musical numbers, etc, would have been not only inartistic, but superfluous. Mrs. Southwick has a voice that is thoroughly trained to express every shade of thought and emotion; and this, together with her wonderful facial expressions, held the audience spellbound-- sometimes almost moved to tears, at other's thrilled with that enthusiasm which the battlefield alone can inspire." - Charlottestown (P.E.I.) Guardian, p. 48

Platform performances were considered literary events and not traditional theater and, as such, were often presented at club meetings, church halls, and for other private audiences. "In the regular professional engagements of Mrs. Southwick she never appears for less than $150 and $200 one of the finest impersonators [elocutionist, reader, reciter, performer - each term used interchangeably for this art] in this country." Because of this distinction, performance reviews were not plentiful in regular newspapers or theatrical pages. However, society columns often included comments on her upcoming calendar events as well as other mentions of recitations.

Jessie Southwick's popular repertoire included:

- "Jeanne D'Arc" (MacKay)
- The Merchant of Venice, Macbeth (Shakespeare)
- Faust (Goethe)
- Various pieces (Browning)

== Personal life ==
Jessie Eldridge married Henry Lawrence Southwick, in 1889, in Philadelphia. Southwick was a professor at Emerson College of Oratory (now Emerson College). He became a partner with Charles Wesley Emerson in 1890. In 1908, Southwick became president of the college, holding that position until his death in 1932.

The Southwicks had three daughters: Ruth (Maxfield) b. 1893, who also taught at Emerson College and was head of the English department; Mildred (Mrs. James E. Potter of Palm Springs, CA), 1895; and Jessie (Ross) 1897.

Jessie lived in Brookline, Massachusetts, in the early 1900s. In the mid-1930s, they lived at 128 Beacon, on a property owned by Emerson College. She died while living at 100 Massachusetts Ave. in Cambridge.

== Bibliography ==
- Expressive Voice Culture Including the Emerson System (1908)
- Meditations in Verse" (1913)
- The Emerson Philosophy of Expression An Application to Character Education" (1930)

== Sources ==
- "Representative Women of New England." (1904) Compiled by Mary Elvira Elliot, Mary A. Stimpson, Martha Seavey Hoyt, and Others. Under the Editorial Supervision of Juila Ward Howe, assisted by Mary H. Graves. Boston, New England Historical Publishing Company.
- Southwick, Jessie Eldridge. Expressive Voice Culture Including the Emerson System, Boston, 1908.
- Southwick, Jessie Eldridge, The Emerson Philosophy of Expression An Application to Character Education, Boston Expression Co., 1930.
