= Shelley Mitchell =

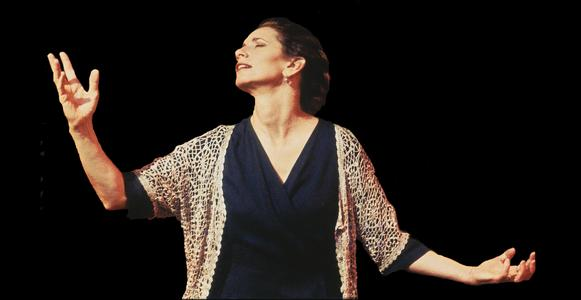
Shelley Mitchell in Talking with Angels

Shelley Mitchell is an American actress, teacher, performance coach and writer. She is best known for her critically acclaimed adaptation of Talking with Angels: Budapest 1943, the true story of Gitta Mallasz. She is based in Los Angeles and uses an approach based on the legacy of Eleonora Duse, whom many consider to be the first modern actor and the mother of Method Acting.

== Background ==
Shelley Mitchell was born and raised in Detroit, Michigan. Her father, a tool and die maker, was a first generation Canadian and her mother, a housewife, was a first generation American; both came from eastern European Jewish families. In the 1970s she trained extensively with Lee Strasberg in his private class and at the Actors Studio. She also attended Emerson College, Circle in the Square Theater School and earned a Bachelor of Science degree in nursing from New York University.

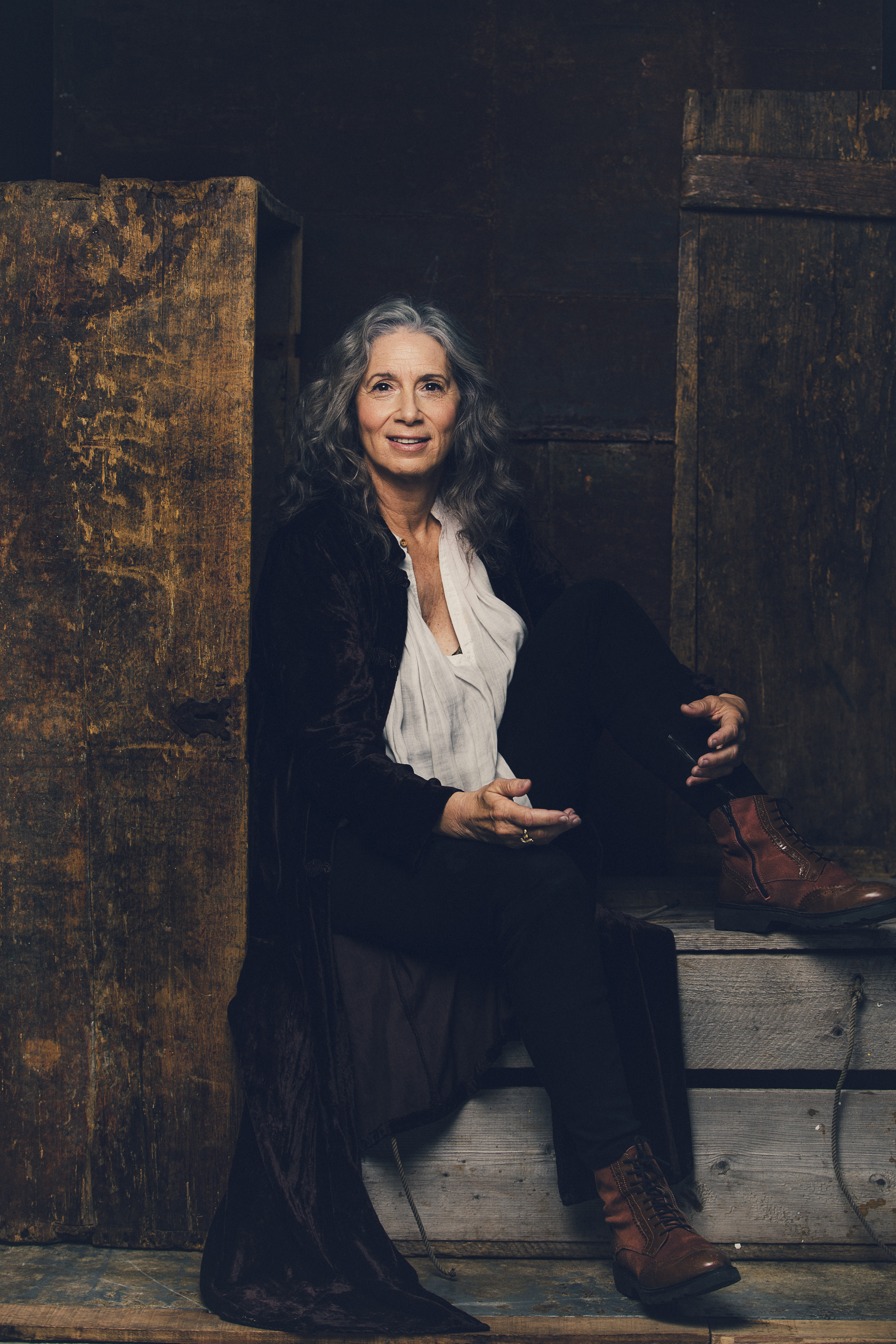
Shelley Mitchell

== Career ==
Mitchell first performed Talking with Angels: Budapest, 1943 on September 19, 2001, at the Milagro Theater in New York City. Since then she has performed it over 400 times at salons and festivals in the USA and internationally at the Irish (2006), Dutch (2010) and Edinburgh (2015) theater festivals.

On film she can be seen in "Green is Gold", the 2016 Audience Choice Award winner at the Los Angeles Film Festival. It was written, directed by and stars her student, Ryon Baxter. Mitchell also appeared in Sorry to Bother You, a satire film featured at the 2018 Sundance Film Festival, and written and directed by her student, Boots Riley.

Shelley Mitchell began teaching acting in 1986, after attending a UNESCO conference in Venice, Italy called Science and the Boundaries of Knowledge: the Prologue of our Cultural Past. The conference stressed the importance of "transdisciplinary research through a dynamic exchange between the natural sciences, the social sciences, art and tradition." Inspired by the message of the conference, she began teaching dramatic art techniques in Venice and eventually added classes in Treviso, Vicenza and Trieste. In 1992, she repatriated to the United States and settled in San Francisco where she taught dramatic art for over 20 years at The Actors Center of San Francisco. She has given workshops and performances at The Esalen Institute, The California Institute of Integral Studies, The Institute of Noetic Sciences, The Carl Jung Institutes of San Francisco and Chicago, The Dutch International Theater Festival and at the Festa del Cinema di Roma.
