= Louise Closser Hale =

American actress and author (1872–1933)

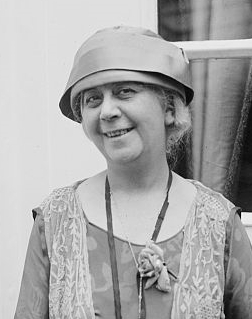
- Born: Louise Closser; October 13, 1872; Chicago, Illinois, U.S.
- Died: July 26, 1933 (aged 60); Los Angeles, California, U.S.
- Occupations: Actress; author; playwright
- Years active: 1894–1933
- Spouse: Walter Hale (m. 1899–1917; his death)

Louise Closser Hale (October 13, 1872 – July 26, 1933) was an American actress, playwright and novelist.

== Early life ==
Louise Closser was born in Chicago, Illinois, on October 13, 1872, and she was educated in the public schools of Indianapolis. Her father was Joseph Closser, a grain dealer, and her mother was Louise Paddock Closser. She had two sisters, Belle and Myla Jo. Hale studied at the American Academy of Dramatic Arts and at the Boston School of Oratory.

== Career ==
=== Acting ===
Hale made her theatrical debut in Detroit in an 1894 production of In Old Kentucky. She initially acted with touring troupes in the Midwest. Her Broadway debut was in Arizona (1900). Her first theatrical success came in 1903 when she appeared in a Broadway production of George Bernard Shaw's Candida. In 1907, she made her London debut in Mrs. Wiggs of the Cabbage Patch.

In 1929, Hale began working in Hollywood. Her first film was The Hole in the Wall (1929). Also in 1929, she reprised her role as Cora Sabbot in the film version of the Broadway play Paris. During her four years in Hollywood, she worked for Columbia, Fox, Paramount, RKO and Warner Bros. studios and performed in 30 films. She often appeared in roles as a mother or grandmother.

=== Writing ===
Hale had a parallel career as an author and playwright starting in the first decade of the 20th century. She cowrote the play Mother's Millions and was a correspondent for Harper's Magazine during World War I. Her books included Home Talent and An American's London. She also was an associate editor for The Smart Set magazine. Her published work exceeded 10 books and 100 short stories.

== Personal life ==
In 1899, Closser married artist and actor Walter Hale, whose name she used for her stage career, and who illustrated a number of her travel books. She collaborated with him in the preparation of many travel works, for which they traveled extensively. The marriage was childless.

Closser Hale was one of the founders of the Stage Women's War Relief during World War I.

== Death ==
Hale was overcome by heat while shopping in Hollywood, California, on July 25, 1933, and she died following a heart attack at Monte Sano Hospital on July 26, 1933 at the age of 60. In her will, Hale requested a simple and inexpensive Episcopalian funeral service. She directed that at the close of the service, her body should be cremated and that "no friend or kin accompany the body further than the church door." The will also said, "If I live in the memory of my friends, I shall have lived long enough." She left her estate to relatives and charities. Her body was cremated and the ashes were interred at Hollywood Forever Cemetery.

== Bibliography ==
- A Motor Car Divorce (1906)
- The Actress; a Novel (1909)
- The Married Miss Worth (1911)
- Her Soul and Her Body (1912)
- Motor Journeys (co-authored with Walter Hale)(1912)
- We Discover New England (1915)
- We Discover the Old Dominion (1916)
- An American's London (1920)
- Home Talent (1926)
- The Canal Boat Fracas (1927)

== Partial filmography ==
- The Hole in the Wall (1929) – Mrs. Ramsay
- Paris (1929) – Cora Sabbot
- Dangerous Nan McGrew (1930) – Mrs. Benson
- Big Boy (1930) – Mother
- The Princess and the Plumber (1930) – Miss Eden
- Captain Applejack (1931) – Aunt Agatha
- Born to Love (1931) – Lady Ponsonby
- Daddy Long Legs (1931) – Miss Pritchard
- Rebound (1931) – Mrs. Jaffrey
- Devotion (1931) – Mrs. Emmet Mortimer
- Platinum Blonde (1931) – Mrs. Schuyler
- Shanghai Express (1932) – Mrs. Haggerty
- The Man Who Played God (1932) – Florence Royle
- Sky Bride (1932) – Mrs. (Ma) Smith
- Letty Lynton (1932) – Miranda, Letty's Maid
- New Morals for Old (1932) – Mrs. Warburton
- Rebecca of Sunnybrook Farm (1932) – Aunt Miranda
- Movie Crazy (1932) – Mrs. Kitterman
- Faithless (1932) – First Landlady
- No More Orchids (1932) – Grandma Holt
- Rasputin and the Empress (1932) – Lazy Spoiled Woman (uncredited)
- The Son-Daughter (1932) – Toy Yah
- Today We Live (1933) – Applegate
- The White Sister (1933) – Mina Bernardo
- The Barbarian (1933) – Powers
- Storm at Daybreak (1933) – Militza Brooska
- Another Language (1933) – Mother Hallam
- Dinner at Eight (1933) – Hattie Loomis
- Duck Soup (1933) – Reception Guest (uncredited)
