= Dangerous Innocence =

1925 film directed by William A. Seiter

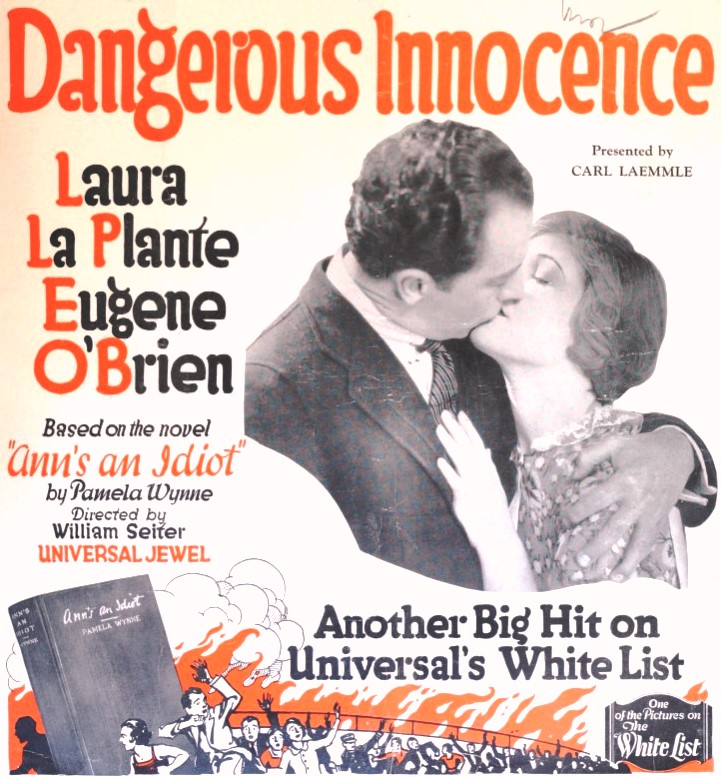
- Advertisement
- Directed by: William A. Seiter
- Written by: Lewis Milestone; James O. Spearing
- Based on: Ann's an Idiot by Pamela Wynne
- Produced by: Carl Laemmle
- Starring: Laura La Plante; Eugene O'Brien; Jean Hersholt; Alfred Allen
- Cinematography: Richard Fryer; Merritt B. Gerstad
- Production company: Universal Pictures
- Distributed by: Universal Pictures
- Release date: April 12, 1925
- Running time: 70 minutes
- Country: United States
- Language: Silent (English intertitles)

Dangerous Innocence is a 1925 American silent romantic comedy film written by Lewis Milestone and James O. Spearing based upon the 1923 novel Ann's an Idiot by Pamela Wynne. Directed by William A. Seiter for Universal Pictures, the film starred Laura La Plante and Eugene O'Brien.

== Plot ==
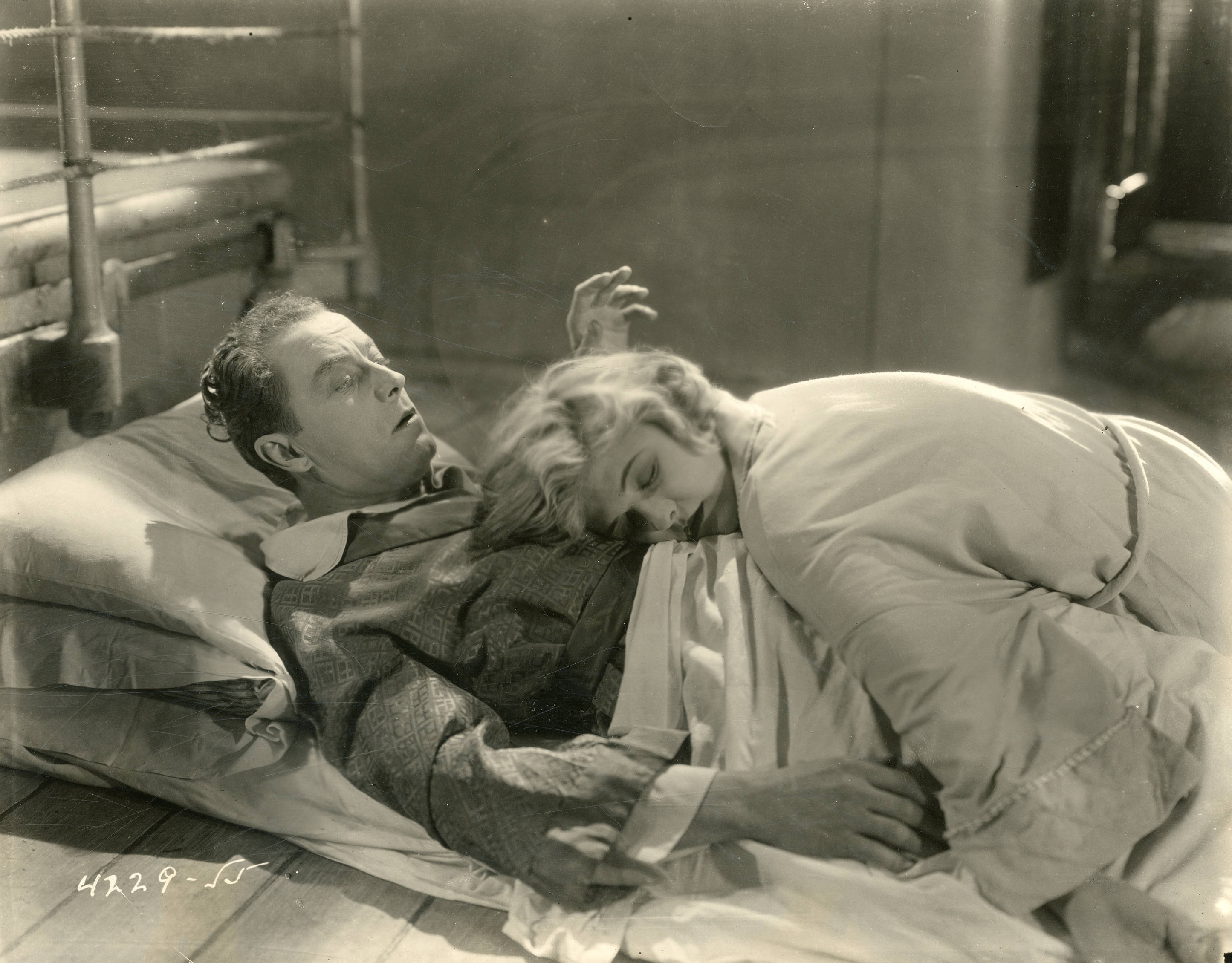
Still with O'Brien and La Plante

On a ship sailing from England to India, Ann Church meets young and dashing Major Anthony Seymour, falls in love and makes some innocent advances to gain his attentions. Ann is 19, but looks 15. The Major at first resists her advances because he believes she is that young, and later he holds back after learning that Ann's mother Muriel was his ex-girlfriend. Another passenger, Gilchrist who is a cad, takes advantage of Ann's naiveté and places her in a compromising position.

To save her reputation, the Major proposes to Ann and she accepts. When they arrive in Bombay, Gilchrist gets even by telling Ann that the Major had had an affair with her mother, causing Ann to break the engagement. Angry, the Major follows Gilchrist off ship and thrashes him. As she prepares to return alone to England, the Major forces Gilchrist to admit to Ann that the relationship between the Major and Ann's mother was platonic and never romantic.

The young couple reunite and are later married at sea.

== Cast ==
- Laura La Plante as Ann Church
- Eugene O'Brien as Maj. Anthony Seymour
- Jean Hersholt as Gilchrist
- Alfred Allen as Capt. Rome
- Milla Davenport as Stewardess
- Hedda Hopper as Muriel Church
- William Humphrey as Church
- Martha Mattox as Aunt
- Janet Gaynor (uncredited)

== Production ==
Approximately one half of the scenes were shot on board the SS Calawaii of the Los Angeles Steamship Company during 14 days during a round trip voyage from San Francisco to Honolulu, Hawaii.

== Reception ==
The New York Times writes that the subject of shipboard romances are "invariably appealing, especially when the heroine has youth and beauty and the hero is a British Major clad in a faultlessly cut uniform", offering that the film begins well and slackens at the end only because the heroine "is just a little bit too credulous, even for a girl who is much in love." They offer that viewers are apt to think of the Rudyard Kipling poem An Unknown Goddess, because La Plante's character of Ann is younger than she appears and Eugene O'Brien's character of Major Anthony Seymour initially takes only a paternal interest in someone he believes a child. When he realizes her age his intentions turn affectionate, but become complicated when he learns that Ann is the daughter of an old sweetheart. They praise director William A. Seiter, writing that he "shows originality and imagination in his direction of a number of scenes." They also share that "Laura La Plante is quite effective as Ann", and that Eugene O'Brien "acts the role of Seymour with sincerity and restraint." They conclude that the film "is a photoplay which can be enjoyed because of the appealing love story and the pains taken by the producers to give an idea of the background, both aboard ship and in India."

== Preservation ==
With no prints of Dangerous Innocence located in any film archives, it is a lost film.
