= The Common Law (1931 film) =

1931 film

- Theatrical poster of film
- Directed by: Paul L. Stein
- Screenplay by: John Farrow
- Based on: The Common Law; 1911 novel by Robert W. Chambers
- Produced by: Charles R. Rogers
- Starring: Joel McCrea; Constance Bennett; Lew Cody
- Cinematography: Hal Mohr
- Edited by: Charles Craft
- Music by: Arthur Lange
- Production company: RKO Radio Pictures
- Release dates: July 17, 1931 (Premiere-New York City); July 24, 1931 (US)
- Running time: 75 minutes
- Country: United States
- Language: English
- Budget: $339,000
- Box office: $713,000

The Common Law is a 1931 American pre-Code romantic drama film directed by Paul L. Stein, produced by Charles R. Rogers and starring Constance Bennett and Joel McCrea. Based on Robert W. Chambers' 1911 novel of the same name, the film was the third film adaptation of the book, and the first during the sound-film era. It was received well both at the box office and by film critics, becoming one of RKO's most financially successful films of the year.

== Plot ==
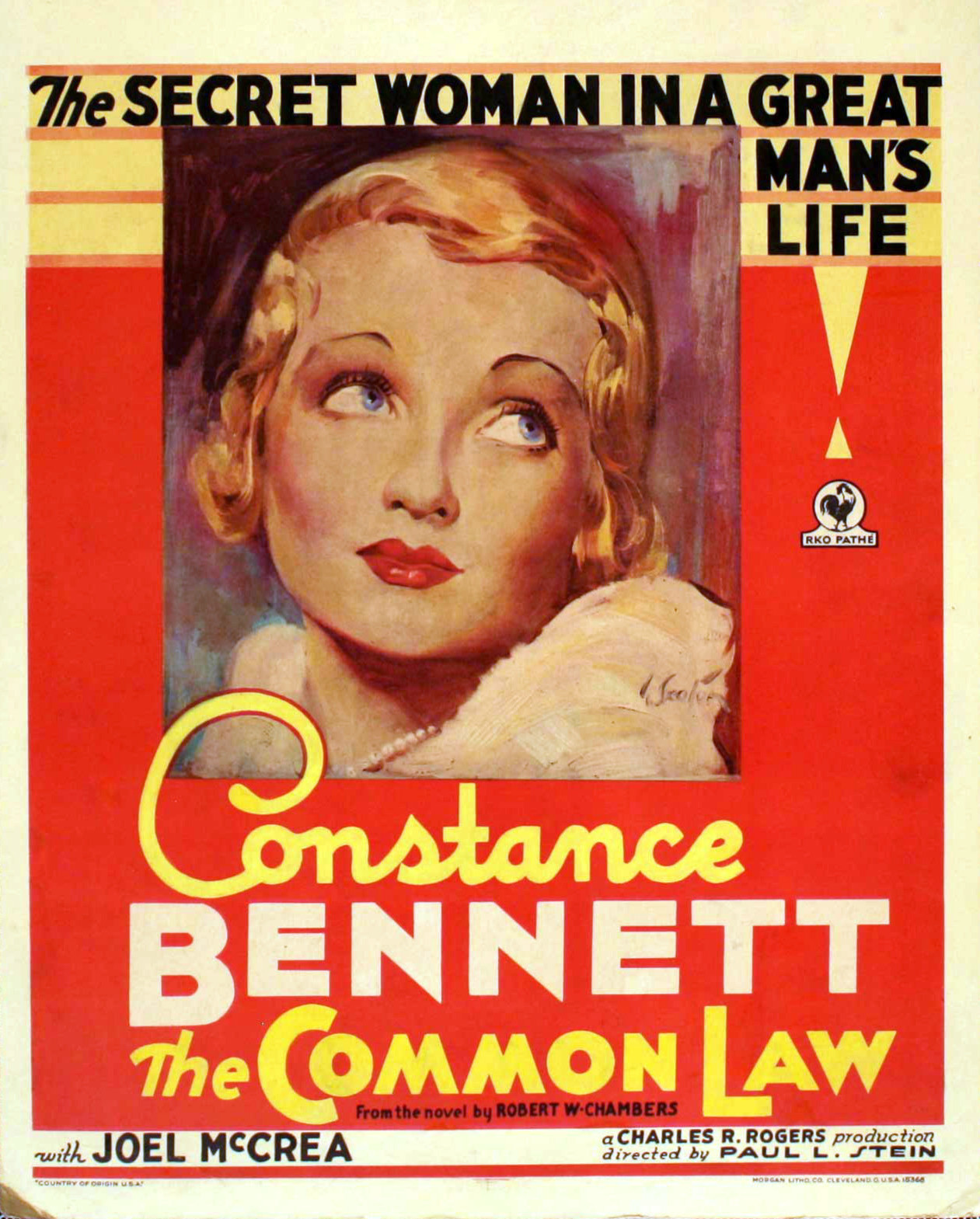
Window card

Valerie West is a young American expatriate living with her wealthy lover Dick Carmedon in Paris. Tired of the relationship, she leaves Carmedon and meets struggling American artist John Neville, for whom she begins posing nude. At first, the relationship is purely business, but Valerie and Neville soon fall in love. They live an idyllic life together.

Valerie does not know that Neville is a member of a wealthy, socially prominent family. Neville's friend Sam tells him about Valerie's past relationship with Carmedon. Valerie confirms the information but states that she had left Carmedon before she met Neville. Disillusioned, Neville changes his mind about proposing to her. Valerie calls him a hypocrite and severs the relationship.

Later, Neville encounters Valerie at a nightclub, where she is out with another man. Neville leaves in disgust but Valerie follows, jumping into his taxi and riding home with him. Soon he proposes marriage, but she asks him to wait, wishing to ensure that their feelings are real before entering a lifelong commitment. When Neville's sister Clare learns about the situation from friends returning from Europe, she lies to Neville, informing him that their father is very ill and insisting that Neville return home.

Valerie accompanies Neville to the family estate. Clare throws a party on the family yacht and invites Carmedon and Neville's former girlfriend. Neville's father tells Valerie that he approves of the relationship, as he sees that his son is happy and more confident. A drunk Carmedon barges into Valerie's stateroom, but she rejects him in full view of Clare. Neville helps Carmedon to his room and punches him. Neville informs Valerie that he wants find a justice of the peace to marry them.

== Cast ==
- Constance Bennett as Valerie West
- Joel McCrea as John Neville
- Lew Cody as Dick Carmedon
- Robert Williams as Sam
- Hedda Hopper as Mrs. Clare Collis
- Marion Shilling as Stephanie Brown
- Walter Walker as John Neville, Sr.
- Paul Ellis as Querido
- Yola d'Avril as Fifi
- Emile Chautard as Doorman (uncredited)
- Albert Conti as Strangeways Party Guest (uncredited)
- Carrie Daumery as Strangeways Party Guest (uncredited)
- George Davis as Charles - Dick's Butler (uncredited)
- Julia Swayne Gordon as Mrs. Strangeways (uncredited)
- George Irving as Doctor (uncredited)
- Dolores Murray as Queen at the Ball (uncredited)
- Tom Ricketts as Elderly Party Guest (uncredited)
- Ellinor Vanderveer as Party Guest (uncredited)
- Nella Walker as Yacht Guest (uncredited)

== Production ==
Robert W. Chambers' 1911 novel was a bestseller in the 1910s and was called "the most daring piece of writing that Chambers ever turned out."

The novel had already been made into a film twice during the silent era. The first was produced by Lewis J. Selznick in 1916 and stars Clara Kimball Young and Conway Tearle. Selznick's son Myron Selznick remade the film in 1923, again starring Tearle, but with Corinne Griffith in the lead female role.

In February 1931, RKO announced its purchase of the rights to Chambers' novel. Constance Bennett was announced as the star, with John Farrow to adapt the screenplay. In mid-March, it was announced that Paul L. Stein would direct the film. By the end of March, roles were cast for Joel McCrea, Lew Cody, Gilbert Roland, Walter Walker, Marion Shilling and Robert Williams. The final major role was cast in April when Hedda Hopper was selected to play Clare. The Common Law entered production in mid-April 1931. By mid-June, shooting on the film had wrapped.

During production, a yacht built for American financier E.H. Harriman was employed as the setting for film's climactic scene. The scene in which Neville meets Valerie one month after she leaves him was set at a nightclub during the famous Four Arts Ball, which was held annually in Paris. Many of the female extras in the scene wore full body makeup because of their scanty costumes. Gwen Wakeling, the head of costuming for RKO, designed the film's costumes.

Shilling recalled that Bennett monopolized McCrea's time during the production: "She had a mad crush on Joel McCrea. The rest of us were just pieces of furniture to her. The minute the director yelled cut, Connie would yank Joel to her portable dressing room, bang the door and not reappear until they were again called to the set."

The film's sexual relationships became an issue for the Hays Office, although it was released during the period before the Motion Picture Production Code was enforced.

== Release ==
The film premiered at the Mayfair Theatre in New York on July 17, 1931 and was released nationally the following Friday. The publisher of Chambers' novel, Grosset & Dunlap, reissued the book as a special edition that featured Bennett on its wrapper, and the books were prominently featured in sales displays to coincide with the film's opening.

Studios at the time often released risqué photographs to promote films. RKO issued a near-nude photograph of Dolores Murray, which was noted by the Hays Office as she may not have actually appeared in the film.

== Reception ==
The New York Times' July 20, 1931, review (bylined L.N.) gives the film short shrift, observing: “All of (it) is familiar to picture-goers of Westchester, and it does not ring any more true than it ever did. Constance Bennett is, of course, very pretty… and Lew Cody is good as the villainous Dick. Joel McCrea seems a bit innocent to be a Parisian art student, but likely the script called for it. Walter Walker is excellent as John's father.”

The New York Age offered a very positive review, calling Bennett's performance "matchless." While praising the performances of Bennett and McCrea The Film Daily wrote a lukewarm review, stating that "... the story itself doesn't produce much of a dramatic punch due to lots of talk and little action." The Reading Times praised the film, calling Bennett "superb" and the rest of the cast "excellent." Modern Screen called the film a "lavish production" and awarded high marks to Bennett and the rest of the cast, stating: "The star and an excellent cast imbue the old tale of artists and models with an up-to-date flavor, and the problem presented is one that will ever hold popular appeal." Another favorable review was offered by Motion Picture Daily, calling it a "sophisticated drama" and praising the performances of Bennett and McCrae, although the publication advised that the film was not suitable for children. Photoplay called the film a "poor adaptation of Robert Chamber's best seller." Screenland listed the film among its "Six Best Pictures of the Month" in October 1931, with Bennett's performance among the ten best. Silver Screen magazine awarded the film a "good" rating.

According to RKO records, the film turned a profit of $150,000. The financial success of the film set a new weekly record for RKO theaters, but The Common Law was among the few financial successes for RKO in 1931.
