= Platinum Blonde (film) =

1931 film by Frank Capra

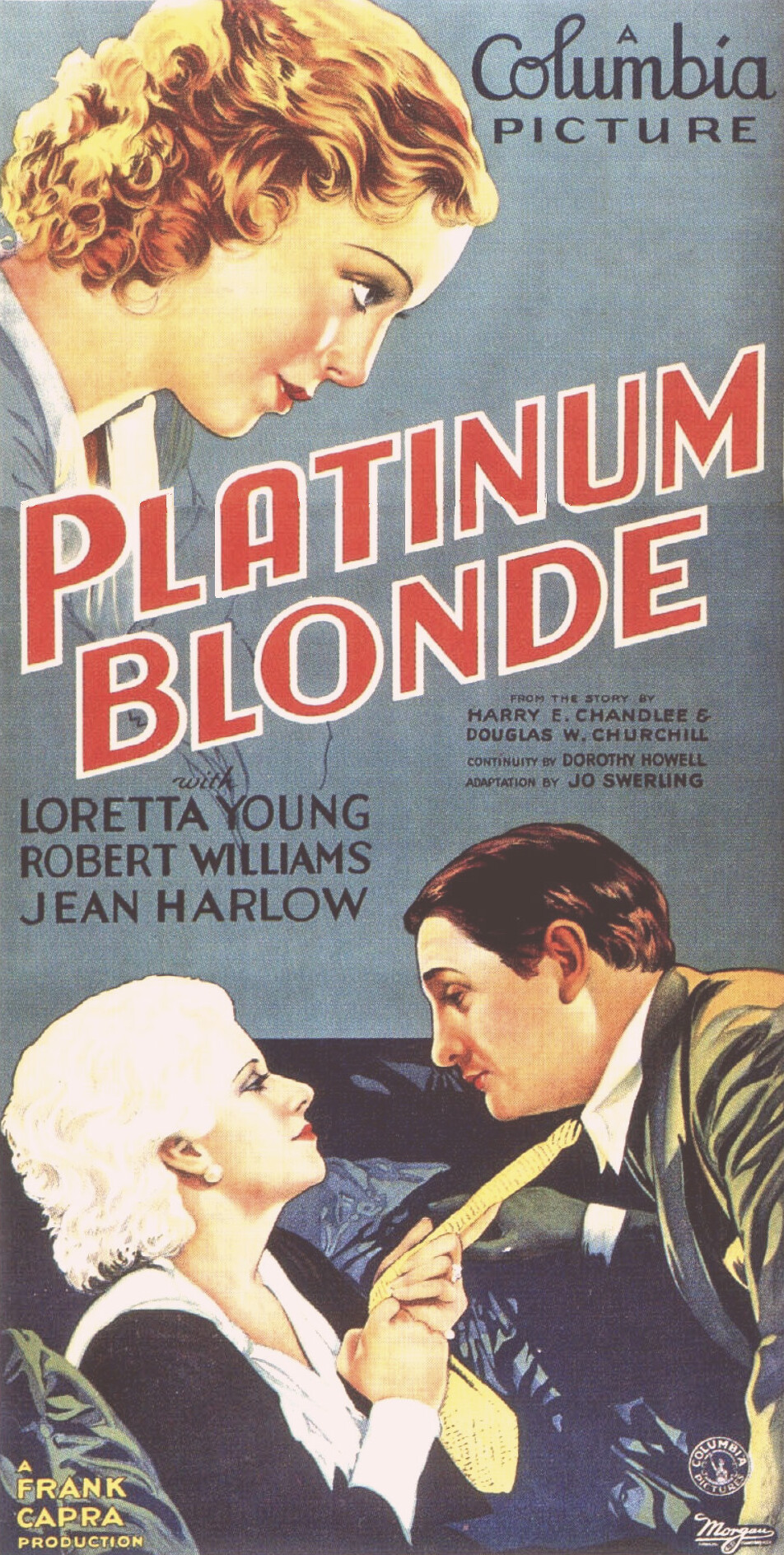
- Theatrical release poster
- Directed by: Frank Capra
- Written by: Robert Riskin (dialogue); Jo Swerling (adaptation); Dorothy Howell (continuity)
- Story by: Harry Chandlee; Douglas W. Churchill
- Produced by: Harry Cohn; Frank Capra
- Starring: Loretta Young; Robert Williams; Jean Harlow
- Cinematography: Joseph Walker
- Edited by: Gene Milford
- Color process: Black and white
- Production company: Columbia Pictures
- Distributed by: Columbia Pictures
- Release date: October 31, 1931
- Running time: 89 minutes
- Country: United States
- Language: English

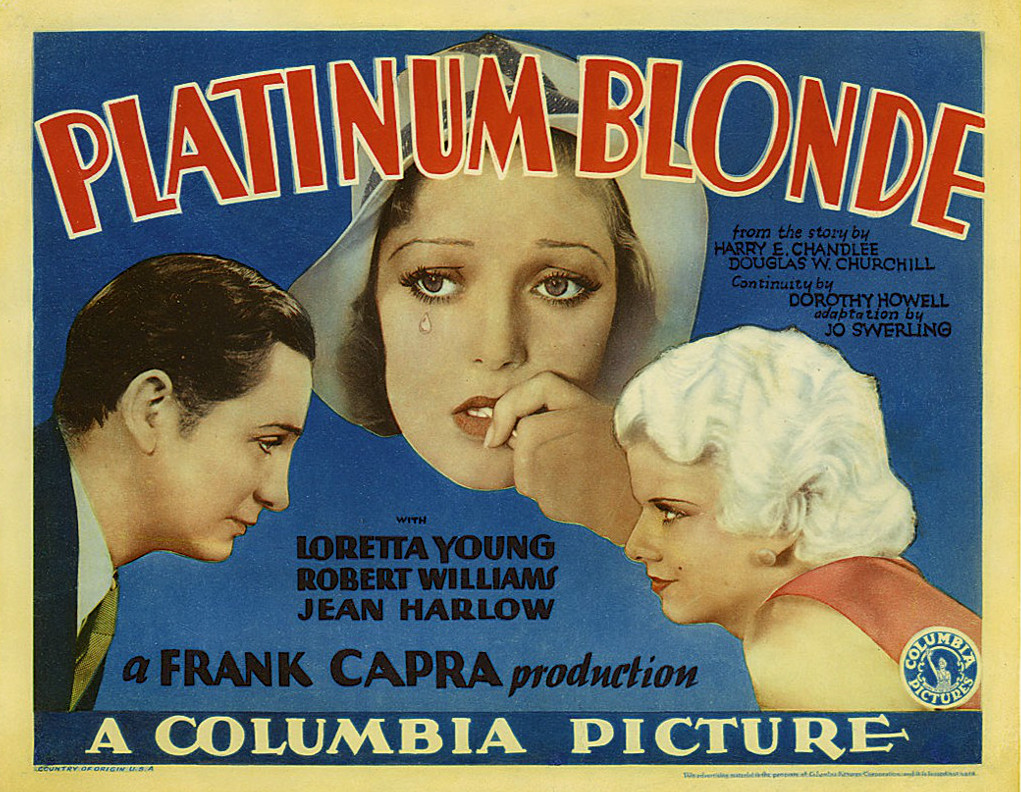
Lobby card for the film

Platinum Blonde is a 1931 American pre-Code romantic comedy film directed by Frank Capra, written by Jo Swerling, and starring Loretta Young, Robert Williams, and Jean Harlow. It was Williams's last screen appearance; he died of peritonitis three days after the film's October 31 release.

Though not as well known as Capra's later 1930s movies, the film's reputation has grown over the years. Platinum Blonde is occasionally aired in the United States on the Turner Classic Movies television network.

== Plot ==
Stewart "Stew" Smith, ace reporter for the Post, is assigned to get the story about the latest escapade of playboy Michael Schuyler, a breach of promise suit by chorus girl Gloria Golden, who has been paid to drop it. Unlike rival Daily Tribune reporter Bingy Baker, he turns down a $50 bribe from Dexter Grayson, the Schuylers' lawyer, to not write anything. He does pretend to be swayed by the pleas of Anne, Michael's sister, but then brazenly calls his editor with the scoop, appalling the Schuylers.

Stew returns to the house to return a copy of Conrad he had taken from the Schuylers' library. The butler, Smythe, tries to make him leave, but Anne sees him. Stew surprises Anne by presenting her with Michael's love letters to Gloria, who had intended to use them to extort more money from the Schuylers. Anne offers Stew a $5,000 check, which he refuses. She asks why he reported the suit, but not the love notes. Stew explains that one was news, the other, blackmail. He later tells her he is writing a play. Intrigued, Anne wonders if she can turn him into a gentleman. She invites him to a party at the house.

They fall in love and soon elope, horrifying Anne's widowed mother, Mrs. Schuyler, an imperious dowager who looks down on Stew's lower-class background. Michael takes it in stride, telling Stew he's not as bad as everyone thinks. The wedding is scooped by the rival Daily Tribune, enraging his editor, Conroy. Even more upset is Stew's best friend Gallagher, a "sob sister" columnist secretly pining for him. Conroy taunts Stew as "a bird in a gilded cage." Despite his bravado, Stew is upset by the implication he is no longer his own man, vowing not to live on Anne's money. However, she cajoles him into moving into the mansion and starts to make him over, buying him garters (despite his objections) and hiring a valet, Dawson.

When the Schuylers hold a reception for the Spanish ambassador, Gallagher substitutes for the society reporter and chats with Stew. Anne is surprised to learn that her husband's best friend (whom she had assumed was a man) is actually a lovely young woman and treats Gallagher icily. Then, Bingy tells Stew the Tribune will give him a column if he signs it "Anne Schuyler's husband." Insulted, Stew punches Bingy when he calls him Cinderella Man. The next morning, Mrs. Schuyler is aghast to find Stew's brawl has made the front page.

Wrestling with his play, Stew invites Gallagher and another friend, Hank from Joe's. They arrive with Joe and several bar patrons in tow and even Bingy shows up to apologize. A raucous party ensues. Meanwhile, Stew and Gallagher ponder the play, deciding to base it on Stew's marriage. Anne, Mrs. Schuyler, and Grayson return as the party is in full swing. Stew apologizes for letting the party get out of control, but protests that he can invite friends to "my house." Anne replies, "Your house?"

Stew returns with Gallagher to his own apartment. Along the way, he gives a homeless man his expensive garters. Grayson stops by to say Anne will pay him alimony, whereupon Stew punches him (earlier, Stew had warned Grayson that his twentieth insult would earn him a "sock to the nose"). Stew tells Gallagher the play could end with the protagonist divorcing his rich wife and marrying the woman whom he had always loved without ever realizing it, or telling her. Overwhelmed, Gallagher hugs him, and the two kiss.

== Cast (in credits order) ==
- Loretta Young as Gallagher
- Robert Williams as Stew Smith
- Jean Harlow as Anne Schuyler (misspelled as "Ann Schuyler" in end credits)
- Halliwell Hobbes as Butler
- Reginald Owen as Grayson
- Edmund Breese as Conroy – The Editor
- Don Dillaway as Michael Schuyler
- Walter Catlett as Bingy
- Claud Allister as Dawson – The Valet
- Louise Closser Hale as Mrs. Schuyler
- Rychard Cramer as Speakeasy Owner (uncredited)

== Reception and legacy ==
Mordaunt Hall of The New York Times called it "a mildly successful venture on the light side of entertainment." Variety wrote that it offered "a lot of light, pleasing comedy" and "a cast that's tops" but described it as "only innocuously spicy" and reported that the dialogue was "way above the story, far outdistancing its situations and plot." Film Daily called it "a big laugh farce filled with comedy punches" and "rich entertainment." The Kansas City Star described it as "a rousing farce" and "a sterling comedy well above par." The New York Daily Mirror lauded it as "one of the gayest, sauciest comedies you've ever seen." The New York American expressed some disappointment, writing, "For all her top billing, Jean Harlow has very little to do, and Loretta Young even less. To say they are competent to the picture's requirements is only a mild compliment." Pauline Kael wrote: "Frank Capra's early talkie about a glib newspaper reporter (Robert Williams) who marries an aristocratic heiress (Jean Harlow, ludicrously miscast but fun to watch anyway) ... The film's considerable attractions include Robert Riskin's uninhibited dialogue and ravishing Loretta Young, who, as a tough-minded girl reporter (prototype of the later Jean Arthur roles), is a natural aristocrat."

Despite the film's measure of positive reviews and star power, it wasn't much of a hit at the box office, with returns around the country reported as "just fair" and "a bit disappointing". The historical significance of the picture would only become apparent in later years as Capra's reputation grew, as did that of Harlow, who, like co-star Williams, died young. Roger Ebert called the film "central to the Jean Harlow legend".
