= Charles Wesley Emerson =

American university founder

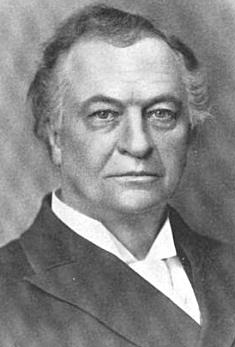
Portrait of Charles Wesley Emerson, ca.1897

Charles Wesley Emerson (1837–1908) was the founder, namesake and first president of Emerson College of Oratory (now Emerson College) in Boston, Massachusetts. Charles Emerson was also a minister with the Unitarian Church and the author of a number of books dealing with oratory.

== Life and career ==
Charles Wesley Emerson was born in Pittsfield, Vermont, in 1837 to Thomas and Mary F. (Hewitt) Emerson, and he was a distant cousin of Ralph Waldo Emerson. The Emersons moved to Stockbridge, Vermont, in 1845 where his father was a notable teacher. Emerson studied with Prof. Augustus Wing, and began preaching at age nineteen.

Prior to establishing the college, Emerson was a minister who preached in Congregational and Unitarian parishes until 1885.

Emerson studied medicine at the University of Pennsylvania in Philadelphia receiving an M.D. in 1877, and he conducted courses in elocution, expression, voice culture, art, and topics related to oratory at the Unitarian Church of Vineland, New Jersey.

In 1877, Charles Emerson enrolled in Boston University's School of Oratory where he studied Delsarte and Swedenborg under the direction and guidance of professor Lewis B. Monroe.

Shortly after the death of Monroe and the closure of the School of Oratory at Boston University, Emerson opened the Boston Conservatory of Elocution, Oratory, and Dramatic Art in 1880. A year later, the name was changed to the Monroe Conservatory of Oratory, in honor of Monroe. In 1890, the name changed again to Emerson College of Oratory and was later shortened to Emerson College in 1939.

During his time as president of the conservatory, Emerson published a number of books including four volumes of The Evolution of Expression which became the core text in the conservatory's curriculum.

In 1900, Henry and Jessie Eldridge Southwick purchased Emerson College. Emerson retired three years later and William James Rolfe took his place as president of the college.

Emerson believed that the ability to communicate was the key to achieving one's full potential. Emerson was confident that once a student completed his academic program, he would have future success, no matter what endeavor or profession they chose.

Emerson is buried in Prospect Hill Cemetery in Millis, Massachusetts.

== Bibliography ==
- Psycho vox; The Emerson system of voice culture (1897)
- Physical Culture (1891)
- Expressive Physical Culture (1900)
- Evolution of Expression - Volume 1 (1905)
- Evolution of Expression – Volume 1 by Charles Wesley Emerson at Project Gutenberg on Project Gutenberg
  - Read on Manybooks.net

== Sources ==
- Short History of Emerson College
- Emerson College Image Archives
