= Rashin Fahandej =

Iranian-born American multimedia artist

- Born: Shiraz, Iran
- Education: Massachusetts College of Art and Design, San Francisco Art Institute, Massachusetts Institute of Technology, Baha'i Institute of Higher Education
- Movement: New Media Artist, Immersive Storyteller, Cultural Activist
- Awards: Prix Ars Electronica Festival Award of Distinction in Digital Musics & Sound Ars; Institute of Contemporary Arts Boston Foster Prize

Rashin Fahandej is an Iranian-American multimedia artist, immersive filmmaker, futurist, and cultural activist whose work centers around marginalized voices as well as the role of media, technology, and public collaboration in generating social change. A proponent of “Art as Ecosystem,” she defines her projects as a “Poetic Cyber Movement for Social Justice,” where art mobilizes a plethora of voices by creating connections between public places and virtual spaces.

== Early life and education ==
Rashin Fahandej was born in Shiraz, Iran and currently resides in Boston, Massachusetts. Her family was a part of the Bahá'í religious group, which has been heavily persecuted in Iran throughout history. It was common for Bahá'ís to have their houses raided, be imprisoned, or killed for their faith.

As a child, Fahandej was segregated from her classmates at school. She grew up being taunted and discriminated against. Although Bahá'ís were allowed to attend school during their younger years, they were prohibited from studying at a university, which is why Fahandej attended a secret underground college created by Bahá'ís from 1996 to 2000. Her family then received one-way passports that allowed them to flee Iran as refugees and move to a small town in Turkey.

Fahandej later moved to the United States and began studying at the Massachusetts College of Art and Design in 2002, receiving her Bachelor of Fine Arts Degree in 2006. She then attended the San Francisco Art Institute in 2008 and received her Master of Fine Arts Degree in 2010. After graduation, Fahandej became a guest lecturer and teaching assistant at multiple universities in the United States, such as Brown University, the Massachusetts College of Art and Design, Bunker Hill Community College, as well as the San Francisco Art Institute. She also works as a professional artist in Boston, Massachusetts. Her work is based on the themes of social justice and blending technology with art. She works in a range of media, such as documentary film, video/sound installations, performance, relational art, photography and painting. Her artworks have been shown both in the United States and internationally. In 2015, Fahandej joined the Boston AIR:City of Boston Artist in residence program in which she explored alternate modes of documentary filmmaking and strived to increase equity through educational art and media programs. In 2016, Fahandej received a fellowship at the Massachusetts Institute of Technology Documentary Lab. In 2019, she won the James and Audrey Foster Prize, which strives to support and recognize Boston-area artists by allowing them to display their artworks at the Boston Institute of Contemporary Art.

== Art ==
Fahandej’s motivation for her artistic practice is her involvement in social justice, which stems from her personal experience as a woman, a member of a minority group in Iran, an immigrant, and an educator. Through her art, she tackles oppressive systems to represent the voices of marginalized groups as well as her personal experiences, to generate different expressions of local and international perspectives. The culmination of these narratives make up what Fahadej refers to as ‘Art as Ecosystem’, which refers to a network that critically discusses social systems.

Installations

Fahadej’s work mainly takes the form of installations where she allows for the collaboration of different mediums. Her installations create a space for contemplation and dialogue between the artwork and its audience. These collaborations of mediums stem from her interest in ‘the fluctuating space of cross-cultural encounter’, in which bringing together different aspects of cultures reflect universal concerns that are fused together through the creative process.

A Father's Lullaby

A Father’s Lullaby is a current project that features a series of interactive public installations, community workshops, as well as a participatory website. The project focuses on investigating the structural violence of mass incarceration through the process of meditations on different topics, such as love and trauma. Through this project, Rahadej highlights the struggles of incarcerated fathers and the impact of their incarceration on their families, specifically those from marginalized communities. The name of the project references a video portion that shows absent fathers singing lullabies and sharing their childhood memories.

The first chapter of the project was exhibited at the Boston Artist in Residence in 2017 and was later exhibited at the Boston Center for the Arts and HUBweek, We The Future in 2018, then at the Institute of Contemporary Art in Boston in 2019.

== Selected exhibitions and awards ==
- 2019 Institute of Contemporary Art, Boston
- 2018 Boston Center for the Arts
- 2017 Boston Artist in Residence at Villa Victoria Center for the Arts
- 2012 The Wooden Synagogue Replication Project
- 2005 Patrick Gavin Award for Painting, Massachusetts College of Art
- 2005 China and Japan Travel Scholarship, Massachusetts College of Art
- 2006 Artist Supply Award, Massachusetts College of Art
- 2010 Kodak Film Grant, San Francisco Art Institute
- 2014 St. Botolph Club Foundation Emerging Artist Award
- 2019 Mass Cultural Council Artist Fellow
- 2019 Framingham Cultural Council award
- 2019 recipient of the James and Audrey Foster Prize
- 2020 American Arts Incubator Lead Artist at ZERO1 and the U.S. Department of State’s Bureau of Educational and Cultural Affairs
