= Pamela Wynne =

British writer

Winifred Mary Watson Scott
- Born: Winifred Mary Watson; 1879; London, England
- Died: January 1959 (aged 79–80); Sissinghurst, Kent, England, UK
- Spouse: William Herbert Schroder Scott (1908–1932)
- Children: 3
- Writing career
- Pen name: Pamela Wynne
- Language: English
- Period: 1923–1959
- Genre: Romance

Pamela Wynne is the pseudonym of Winifred Mary Scott, née Watson (1879 – 29 January 1959), a British writer of over 60 romantic novels from 1923 until her death in 1959.

== Biography ==
=== Personal life ===
She was born with the name Winifred Mary Watson on 1879 in London, England, the fourth child of Lily Watson, a successful writer, and her husband Samuel Watson, a solicitor in the City of London. Two more children were to follow. The family were affluent enough to have Winifred educated privately in Lausanne, Switzerland and it was during her education that she found her love of writing.

On 14 November 1905, she married William Herbert Schroder Scott in Bombay, India, . She bore three children, William Patrick Temple Scott born 1908, Herbert Wyndham Fitzgerald Scott born 1910, Sholto Haig Scott-Watson born 1917. They divorced in 1932.

She died on 29 January 1959 in Sissinghurst, Kent.

=== Writing career ===
As Pamela Wynne wrote more than 60 romantic novels during her lifetime, many of which inspired on her own experiences of living in India. Two of her books were turned into major motion pictures, Dangerous Innocence (1925) with Laura La Plante and Eugene O'Brien and Devotion (1931) with Ann Harding and Leslie Howard.

== Bibliography ==
- Ann's an Idiot (1923)
- Warning (1923)
- The Dream Man (1924)
- Ashes of Desire (1925)
- Penelope Finds Out (1926)
- A Passionate Rebel (1927)
- Concealed Turnings (1927)
- Mademoiselle Dahlia (1928)
- Under the Mosquito Curtain (1928)
- At the End of the Avenue (1929)
- Rainbow in the Spray (1929)
- The Conquering Lover (1929)
- The Dream Man (1929)
- A Little Flat in the Temple (1930)
- East Is Always East (1930)
- The Last Days of September (1931)
- Love in a Mist (1932)
- Delight (1933)
- The Sealed Door of Love (1933)
- All About Jane (1934)
- Bracken Turning Brown (1934)
- Concealed Turnings (1934)
- Love Comes To Susan (1934)
- A Dream Come True (1935)
- Priscilla Falls in Love (1935)
- Leave It To Love (1936)
- Love Begins at Forty (1936)
- Valerie (1937)
- Choose From the Stars (1938)
- Sunshine After Rain (1938)
- Love's Lotus Flower (1939)
- Honey-Coloured Moon (1939)
- Splendour of Love (1939)
- Happiness Round the Corner (1940)
- Life Will Be Different (1942)
- Victory For Love (1943)
- Merry Widows (1943)
- Diana's Last Day (1945)
- Pineapple Place (1946)
- Do You See The Sun? (1946)
- Gift of a Daughter (1947)
- A Knight in Mufti (1948)
- Come With Me to the Stars (1949)
- Forsaking All Others (1949)
- Life Is For Loving (1949)
- Safe at Last (1949)
- Long Corrdiors (1950)
- Man's Desire (1951)
- A Sunday in June (1953)
- Dandelions For Henry (1954)
- Girl Castaways (1954)
- The Tide Has Turned (1954)
- Daughter of Daybreak (1955)
- Search for Love (1955)
- The Doctor Decided (1956)
- Moonlight Behind Me (1956)
- Secluded Situation (1956)
- The Doctor And Mrs Marlowe (1956)
- Climbing To Happiness (1957)
- Jaqueline Rides for a Fall (1957)
- Oh What a Lovely Day (1957)
- Carol's By Candlelight (1958)
- Rescue of Rosemary (1959)
- Throw Wide the Windows (1959)

== Sources ==
- The Times on Line, G.R.O Births Index, G.R.O Deaths Index
- National Archive: Divorce papers, listing dates and births of children
- National Archive: Passenger Lists India to Great Britain
