= William Gilligan =

American academic and administrator

William Gilligan is an American academic administrator who was interim president of Emerson College from 2021 to 2023. Prior to this role, he was the vice president for information technology at Emerson, retiring from that position in 2020.

== Biography ==
Gilligan holds a bachelor's degree in economics from Boston College, a Master of Science in teaching from the University of New Hampshire, and a Doctor of Education in mathematics from Boston University.

Gilligan joined Emerson College in 1984 as an assistant professor. He served as treasurer of the ECC-AAUP union chapter from 1985 to 1987, chaired the Faculty Assembly from 1992 to 1994, and was a long-standing member of the Faculty Council. He also acted as the Faculty Athletics Representative to the NCAA between 1991 and 1994, and 2005 and 2007. In 1999, he was appointed as one of the college's twelve vice presidents and led the IT department until 2021 when Brian Basgen succeeded him.

Academic offices
Preceded by M. Lee Pelton	President of Emerson College; 2021–2023	Succeeded by Jay M. Bernhardt
