= Jay M. Bernhardt =

American researcher (born 1969)

Jay Bernhardt
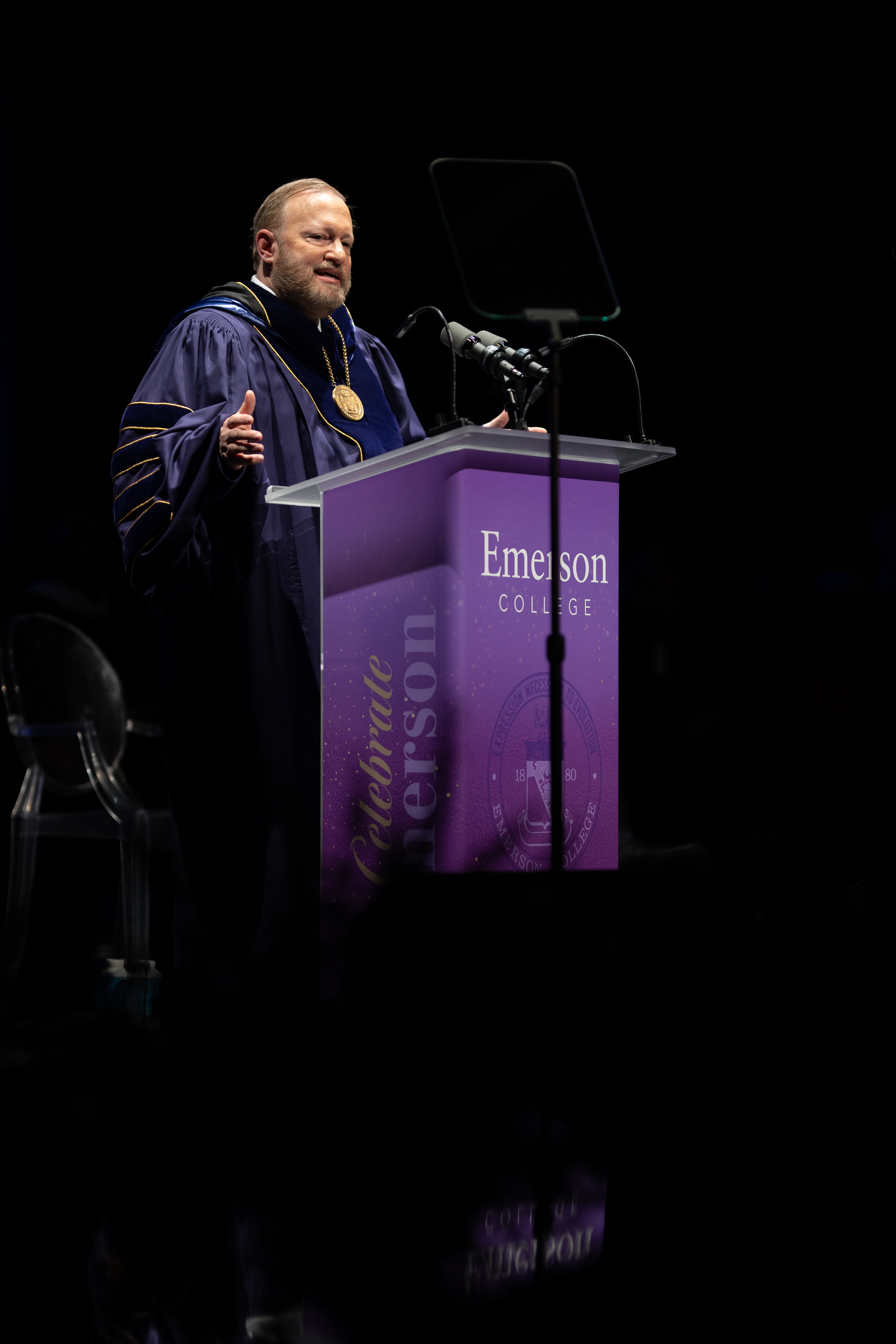
- Born: 1969 (age 56–57); Princeton, New Jersey, U.S.
- Occupation: President of Emerson College

Academic background
- Education: Rutgers University (BA, MPH); University of North Carolina, Chapel Hill (PhD)

Academic work
- Discipline: Public health
- Institutions: Emerson College; Moody College of Communication at The University of Texas at Austin; University of Florida; Rollins School of Public Health at Emory University; University of Georgia

Jay M. Bernhardt (born 1969) is an American public health specialist and academic. Bernhardt has served as the president of Emerson College since June 2023. He was previously the dean of the Moody College of Communication at The University of Texas at Austin from 2016 to 2023.

== Early life and education ==
Bernhardt is Jewish and grew up in East Brunswick, New Jersey. He attended Rutgers University, where he earned a B.A. in sociology and minored in computer science. He earned a Master of Public Health (MPH) degree from Rutgers and the University of Medicine and Dentistry of New Jersey in 1994. Bernhardt earned his Ph.D. in public health from the University of North Carolina at Chapel Hill (UNC) in 1999, with an interdisciplinary focus on health communication.

Bernhardt has been inducted into honor societies including the Cap and Skull Society at Rutgers and the Order of the Grail-Valkyries at UNC, and received awards including the Everett M. Rogers Award for Excellence in Health Communication and the Jay S. Drotman Memorial Award from the American Public Health Association.

== Career ==
Bernhardt began his academic career as an assistant professor in the School of Health and Human Performance at the University of Georgia in 1999 before joining the Rollins School of Public Health at Emory University in 2001. From 2005 to 2010, Bernhardt worked at the Centers for Disease Control and Prevention (CDC), where he directed the National Center for Health Marketing, overseeing and advancing the agency's communication, marketing, partnerships, and new media innovations. In 2010, he joined the School of Health and Human Performance at the University of Florida, where he served as department chair, professor and center director. He joined the University of Texas at Austin in July 2014 as professor in the Department of Communication Studies and the Stan Richards School of Advertising and Public Relation. Later, he helped establish the Center for Health Communication and served as its director. In 2015, he was named as the interim dean of the Moody College of Communication.

Bernhardt became the sixth dean of the Moody College of Communication on March 1, 2016. Bernhardt's tenure has led to the development of new programs including a four-year honors program, B.A. degree in communication and leadership and a “study away” program in New York City known as UTNY. He was active in recruited more than 50 new faculty members and new research centers, institutes and programs.

The Jay M. Bernhardt Award for Staff Excellence at the University of Texas is named in his honor. In 2023, the Moody College of Communication gave Bernhardt the Robert C. Jeffrey College Benefactor Award honoring people "who have given generously to the college with their time or resources", in recognition of his efforts to strengthen faculty and staff culture.

In June 2023, Bernhardt became the thirteenth president of Emerson College in Boston, Massachusetts, succeeding M. Lee Pelton. After extensive negotiations, he concluded an agreement with the Emerson College Full-time Faculty Union (ECCAAUP). The agreement, effective from September 1, 2023, to the end of the 2028 academic year, features salary increases aimed at enhancing faculty recruitment and retention.

Bernhardt's investiture ceremony at the Cutler Majestic Theatre on March 22, 2024, coincided with a protest focused on both Palestinian liberation and tuition hikes. A month later, continued protests culminated on April 25, 2024, when Boston Police cleared an encampment in Boylston Place Alley, resulting in the arrest of 118 people, including many Emerson students, as part of the nationwide campus protests related to the Israel–Hamas War. The following day, the Student Government Association called for the resignation of President Bernhardt, citing concerns within the Emerson community regarding support and safety.

Emerson's five-year strategic plan, announced by Bernhardt in 2025, prioritizes academics, collaboration, community engagement, and operational excellence. This has included adding community spaces on the campus for students, faculty, and staff. During Bernhardt's tenure, Emerson also established its Department of Visual Media Arts as a new school within the college, the School of Film, Television, and Media Arts, and appointed the first dean for the Emerson Los Angeles campus on Sunset Boulevard.

== Research ==
His research is focused on digital health through the application of communication and technology to public health and healthcare. He worked on research wireless mobile technology for health-related data collection and personalized text messages, and the application of new and social media for health communication,

== Selected publications ==
- Hall, A. K.; Cole-Lewis, H.; Bernhardt, J. M. (2015). "Mobile Text Messaging for Health: A Systematic Review of Reviews". Annual Review of Public Health. 36: 393–415. doi:10.1146/annurev-publhealth-031914-122855. PMC 4406229. PMID 25785892.
- Payne, Hannah E.; Lister, Cameron; West, Joshua H.; Bernhardt, Jay M. (February 26, 2015). "Behavioral functionality of mobile apps in health interventions: a systematic review of the literature". JMIR mHealth and uHealth. 3 (1): e20. doi:10.2196/mhealth.3335. PMC 4376122. PMID 25803705.
- Bernhardt, Jay M.; Felter, Elizabeth M. (March 1, 2004). "Online pediatric information seeking among mothers of young children: results from a qualitative study using focus groups". Journal of Medical Internet Research. 6 (1): e7. doi:10.2196/jmir.6.1.e7. PMC 1550581. PMID 15111273.
- Bernhardt, J. M. (2004). "Communication at the Core of Effective Public Health - PMC". American Journal of Public Health. 94 (12): 2051–2053. doi:10.2105/ajph.94.12.2051. PMC 1448586. PMID 15569948.
- Wingood, Gina M.; DiClemente, Ralph J.; Bernhardt, Jay M.; Harrington, Kathy; Davies, Susan L.; Robillard, Alyssa; Hook, Edward W. (March 15, 2003). "A Prospective Study of Exposure to Rap Music Videos and African American Female Adolescents' Health". American Journal of Public Health. 93 (3): 437–439. doi:10.2105/AJPH.93.3.437. PMC 1447759. PMID 12604490.

== Awards and recognition ==
- 2023: Robert C. Jeffrey College Benefactor Award
- 2025: Boston Power List of the 150 most influential Bostonians

Academic offices
Preceded by William Gilligan	President of Emerson College; 2023–present	Incumbent
