= Jacqueline Liebergott =

American academic administrator

Jacqueline Weis Liebergott is an American retired academic who served as the first female president of Emerson College from 1992 to 2011.

== Biography ==
A graduate of the University of Maryland, Liebergott earned her master's and doctoral degrees in speech-language pathology from the University of Pittsburgh.

Liebergott began her career at Emerson College as a professor in the division of Communication Sciences and Disorders. She progressed up the ranks to graduate dean, academic dean, vice president and interim president before being elected president in 1993. Liebergott signed the Amethyst initiative, agreeing to lower the drinking age to 18. On December 2, 2009, Liebergott announced to the Emerson community her retirement, effective June 30, 2011.

Academic offices
Preceded by John Zacharis	President of Emerson College; 1993–2011	Succeeded by M. Lee Pelton
