= Stephen E. Thorsett =

American astronomer

25th President of Willamette University
- Incumbent
- Assumed office July 1, 2011
- Preceded by: M. Lee Pelton

Personal details
- Born: December 3, 1964 (age 61) New Haven, Connecticut, U.S.
- Education: Carleton College (BA); Princeton University (PhD)

Stephen Erik Thorsett (born December 3, 1964) is an American academic and astronomer serving as the president of Willamette University. His research interests include radio pulsars and gamma-ray bursts. He is known for measurements of the masses of neutron stars and for the use of binary pulsars to test the theory of general relativity. Thorsett was a professor and dean at the University of California, Santa Cruz, before becoming president of Willamette University in July 2011.

== Early life and education ==
Thorsett and his twin brother, David Thorsett, were born in New Haven, Connecticut, to Grant Thorsett and his wife, Karen. Stephen grew up in Salem, Oregon, where his father was a biology professor at Willamette University. After attending elementary school and junior high in Salem, he graduated from South Salem High School in 1983. During his youth, he earned money picking berries and with several jobs at Willamette.

Following high school, he attended Carleton College in Northfield, Minnesota, where he received a Bachelor of Arts degree in mathematics in 1987, graduating summa cum laude. Thorsett then pursued graduate studies at Princeton University, where he received a Ph.D. in physics in 1991 after completing a doctoral dissertation, titled "Observing millisecond and binary pulsars", under the supervision of Dan Stinebring and Joseph Taylor. With graduate school classmates Nathan Newbury, Michael J. Newman, John Ruhl, and Suzanne Staggs he is the author of the textbook Princeton Problems in Physics while at Princeton in 1991.

== Career ==
After graduation from Princeton, he was a Robert A. Millikan Research Fellow in physics at Caltech and an assistant professor of physics at Princeton. He received the Ernest F. Fullam Award of the Dudley Observatory in 1994, and was named an Alfred P. Sloan Fellow in 1997. In 1999, he was hired at the University of California, Santa Cruz as a professor of astronomy and astrophysics. Thorsett was named dean of the school's Division of Physical and Biological Sciences on July 1, 2006.

In 2004, with collaborators Ingrid Stairs and Zaven Arzoumanian, he made the first measurement of gravitational spin-orbit coupling in a binary system. He helped discover the oldest known extrasolar planet and was the first to suggest that a nearby gamma-ray burst might cause a mass extinction event. He is a co-editor of three volumes for the Astronomical Society of the Pacific. He is also a collaborator on the upcoming Nuclear Spectroscopic Telescope Array x-ray satellite experiment.

On May 14, 2011, he was named as the 25th president of Willamette University in Salem, Oregon. He assumed the position on July 1, 2011, replacing M. Lee Pelton who had resigned to take the presidency at another college.

Academic offices
Preceded by M. Lee Pelton	President of Willamette University; 2011–Present	Succeeded by Current
