= Allen E. Koenig =

Allen E. Koenig (1939–2012) was an American academic administrator who served as the president of Emerson College from 1979 to 1989.

== Early life and education ==
Born in Los Angeles, California, he graduated from Loyola High School in 1957. He obtained a bachelor's degree from the University of Southern California in 1961, a master's degree from Stanford University in 1962, and a doctorate from Northwestern University in 1964, all in communications.

== Career ==
Koenig's early career included teaching, research, and administrative positions at colleges across several states, including California, Wisconsin, Ohio, Michigan, Iowa, and Massachusetts. While serving as an assistant professor at Ohio State University, he met Judy Gill; they married in 1969.

Koenig worked with the American Association of University Professors in Washington, D.C., before becoming vice president of development at Capital University in Columbus, Ohio. He later held positions at Marycrest College in Davenport, Iowa, and directed the Idyllwild music and arts school in California, then affiliated with the University of Southern California.

From 1979 to 1989, Koenig was the president of Emerson College. During his tenure, the college acquired the Majestic Theatre and several buildings in the Back Bay area. His proposals to relocate the campus to Lawrence and to establish a law school in Lowell were met with disagreement, leading to his departure in 1989.

Koenig subsequently served as president of Chapman University in Orange, California, for two years. He co-founded the Registry for College and University Presidents, serving as its vice chairman. In 1993, he became a partner at R.H. Perry Associates, an executive search firm based in Washington, D.C., where he spent 19 years assisting in the recruitment of senior administrators for higher education institutions.
