= Emerson College =

Private university in Boston, Massachusetts, US

Coordinates: 42°21′07″N 71°03′58″W

- Former names: Boston Conservatory of Elocution, Oratory, and Dramatic Art (1880); Monroe Conservatory of Oratory (1881–1889); Emerson College of Oratory (1890–1938)
- Motto: "Expression Necessary to Evolution"
- Type: Private college
- Established: 1880 (146 years ago)
- Founder: Charles Wesley Emerson
- Accreditation: NECHE
- Endowment: $293 million (2025)
- President: Jay M. Bernhardt
- Academic staff: 469 (2019)
- Students: 5,900 (2022)
- Undergraduates: 4,117 (2022)
- Postgraduates: 1,783 (2022)
- Location: Boston, Massachusetts, United States
- Campus: Large City, 8 acres (0.032 km^{2})
- Newspaper: The Berkeley Beacon
- Other campuses: Los Angeles Well, Limburg, Netherlands
- Colors: Purple; Gold
- Nickname: Lions
- Sporting affiliations: NCAA Division III – NEWMAC; ECAC
- Mascot: Griff the Lion
- Website: emerson.edu
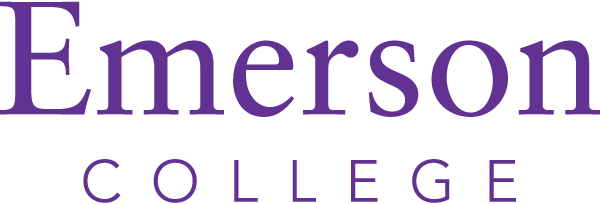

Emerson College is a private college in Boston, Massachusetts, United States. It was founded in 1880 by Charles Wesley Emerson as a school of oratory. The school offers more than 30 undergraduate and graduate degree programs, as well as professional training, primarily focused on the arts and communication, grounded in a liberal arts framework. Emerson is a founding member of the ProArts Consortium, a collaborative association of six neighboring Boston-based institutions dedicated to collegiate-level arts education.

Originally based in Boston's Pemberton Square, the college moved neighborhoods several times and is now located in the Theater District along the south side of the Boston Common. It maintains campuses in Los Angeles and in the Netherlands. Emerson is also notable for the college's namesake public opinion poll, Emerson College Polling.

== History ==
=== Origins ===
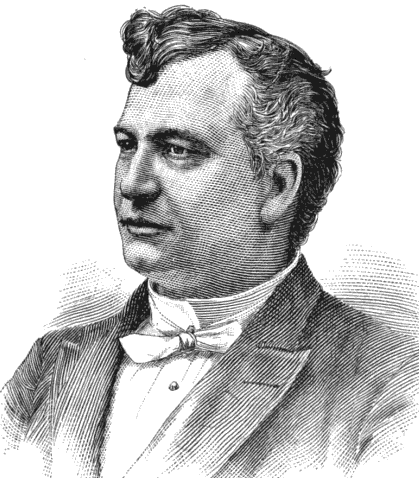
Charles Wesley Emerson (1887), founder and namesake of Emerson College

Charles Wesley Emerson founded the Boston Conservatory of Elocution, Oratory, and Dramatic Art in 1880, a year after Boston University closed its School of Oratory. Classes were held at Pemberton Square in Boston, where ten students enrolled in the conservatory's first class.

The following year, the institution changed its name to the Monroe Conservatory of Oratory, in honor of Charles Emerson's teacher at Boston University's School of Oratory, Professor Lewis B. Monroe.

In 1890, the name changed again to Emerson College of Oratory and was later shortened to Emerson College in 1939.

=== Early expansion and growth ===
The college expanded and rented space at 36 Bromfield Street, and moved to Odd Fellows Hall on Berkeley and Tremont Streets in the South End of Boston. With the new location, the college's first library was established in 1892. Henry Lawrence Southwick, a faculty member and alumnus, became a financial partner for the college with Charles Wesley Emerson in 1889. This financial partnership led to the acquisition of the Boston School of Oratory from Moses T. Brown in 1894.

At the turn of the century, faculty members Henry and Jessie Eldridge Southwick and William H. Kenney purchased the college from Dr. Emerson. Soon after, the college rented a new location in Chickering Hall.

Dr. Emerson retired in 1903 and William J. Rolfe, a Shakespearean scholar and actor, was named the second President of Emerson College of Oratory. His service as president lasted until his retirement in 1908.

As the Student Government Association of the college held its first meeting in 1908, the third president of the college, Henry Lawrence Southwick, was inaugurated. During his tenure, the study of acting and stagecraft became more prominent in the college curriculum and the college rented a new building at 30 Huntington Avenue in Copley Square. The college was also granted the right to award Bachelor of Literary Interpretation (B.L.I.) degrees. In addition, Emerson became the first school with a collegiate-level program in children's theater in 1919. The school offered its first course in Journalism in 1924.

The college purchased its first piece of real estate with a new women's dormitory building at 373 Commonwealth Avenue in the Back Bay, and started intramural sports in 1931 with the organization of volleyball games.

=== Administrative restructuring ===
In 1930, full charge and control of the college was transferred to the Board of Trustees by William H. Kenney, Henry Lawrence Southwick, and Jessie Eldridge Southwick.

In 1932, the first course in radio broadcasting was taught by the program director of WEEI, a Boston AM radio station. Harry Seymour Ross became the fourth president of Emerson College in 1933. That year, the college purchased buildings at 128 and 130 Beacon Street, beginning its presence in Boston's Back Bay. Emerson kept ownership of these buildings until summer 2003.

In the following years, a professional training program in speech pathology (1935) and the first undergraduate program in broadcast journalism (1937) were offered for the first time in the United States. Construction of a theater behind 128–130 Beacon was completed in 1939, and the institution was granted the right to award Master of Arts degrees in 1941.

=== Post-war era ===
In the post-war era, the G.I. Bill of Rights and the Broadcasting curriculum contributed to the rebalancing of the student body from a primarily-female population to an equally-balanced population of men and women. Boylston Green, the first president to have no prior association with the college, used his background as a dean of students to enhance extracurricular activities, including the establishment of a student activities fee. These efforts led to the first publication of Emerson's student newspaper, The Berkeley Beacon, in 1947, which is still in production today.

Emerson also saw major development in its broadcasting program. A one-year Certificate of Broadcasting was offered via evening classes. The FCC awarded the college a 10-watt license in 1949, and WERS, the first educational FM radio station in New England, was born. The station's power was increased to 300 watts three years later, and 18,000 watts by 1953.

At the start of the decade, in 1950, Emerson College became a member of the New England Association of Colleges and Secondary Schools, an accreditation association for schools and colleges in New England.

President Green left the college in 1949 after being selected as president of the University of the South, and Godfrey Dewey served as Acting President until 1951. At that time, Jonathon French was appointed as Acting President, and he became president in December of that year, despite never being formally inaugurated.

=== Financial crisis of 1952 and recovery ===
The college suffered from a severe financial crisis in 1952, and sought $50,000 in emergency funding. At the time, the Chairman of the Corporation stated that without these funds, the college had three alternatives: go broke, sell out, or merge with another institution. Led by the National Alumni Council, a grassroots campaign was launched to improve the financial situation of the college. The efforts led to the resignation of the Council of Trustees, which was then replaced mostly by alumni. The new board elected a former Emerson history professor, S. Justus McKinley, as the fifth President of Emerson College.

Pulling out of its financial crisis, the college started to develop its programs with new facilities. In 1953, Emerson opened The Robbins Speech, Language and Hearing Clinic at 145 Beacon Street, furthering the Communication Sciences and Disorders Program. A television studio was dedicated at 130 Beacon in 1954, with its first closed-circuit TV program the following year as WERS-TV. The first annual spring musical, Lady in the Dark by Moss Hart, was presented. Later, the school was authorized to grant honorary degrees, Bachelors and Masters of Science in speech, and a Bachelors of Music in conjunction with the Longy School of Music.

=== Back Bay as Emerson's campus ===
As the 1960s started, 373 Commonwealth Avenue was sold to purchase a dormitory at 100 Beacon Street for 609 undergraduate and 29 graduate students. A year later, a building at 150 Beacon Street was obtained for dorms, a dining hall, and administrative offices. With major gifts from Elisabeth Abbot Smith and J.F. Buzzard, the college library moved from the fourth floor of 130 Beacon Street into its own building at 303 Berkeley Street. In 1964, two buildings were purchased: 96 Beacon Street, which became the student union building, and 132–134 Beacon Street, which became a dormitory. The campus remained primarily in Back Bay until the late 1990s.

In 1967, Richard Chapin, former Dean of the Harvard Business School was inaugurated as the seventh president of Emerson College.

Shortly afterwards, an academic planning committee approved a new course of study for general education requirements. The first level of this program replaced the college-wide requirements with a two-year interdisciplinary course of study and electives. In order to accommodate this new program, the building at 67–69 Brimmer Street was purchased. The Institute of Interdisciplinary Studies was born. In 1971, the college gained authorization to grant BFA and BS degrees, and in 1985 it was authorized to grant MFA degrees.

=== Attempted relocation ===
Though Emerson College has moved to various locations within the city of Boston, the appointment of Allen E. Koenig (the ninth President of Emerson College) almost took the college completely outside of Boston. As soon as he was inaugurated in 1979, Koenig initiated talks with Pine Manor College in Chestnut Hill, Massachusetts to relocate Emerson and merge the two schools. However, an agreement was never reached and the plan was dropped entirely.

At the start of the 1980s, Koenig made a proposal to the board of trustees for a major renovation of the college's facilities. The plan allowed for new performance spaces, classrooms, and faculty offices at Brimmer Street; remodeling the Library and Learning Resources Center at 150 Beacon; remodeling the 303 Berkeley building for the Humanities and Social Sciences Division; a new radio/audio complex at 126 Beacon; and construction of two new television studios behind 130 Beacon. In 1984, 355 Commonwealth Avenue was purchased for Administration and 21 Commonwealth Avenue was purchased for the Communication Studies department. The college also received the authorization to grant MFA degrees in Creative Writing in 1985.

Despite the newly purchased Commonwealth Avenue buildings, Lawrence, Massachusetts, was soon being discussed as a new location for Emerson College, about 44.5 km (27.7 mi) away from Boston. The Mayor of Lawrence announced that the necessary land would be taken by eminent domain and sold to Emerson for a token payment of $100. However, the five affected private landowners disagreed with this arrangement and fought the city in court. Three years later in 1988, Judge John Forte ruled in favor of the City of Lawrence. The river-front site in Lawrence was proposed as the new campus for the college. However, as real estate values in Boston dropped and the costs of constructing a new campus increased, the plans were put on hold. Koenig resigned as president in 1989, and the plan was officially abandoned in 1990.

In 1988, the college bought a building at Zero Marlborough Street (also known as 6 Arlington Street) for dormitories and a dining hall.

=== Rebirth in the Historic Theater District ===
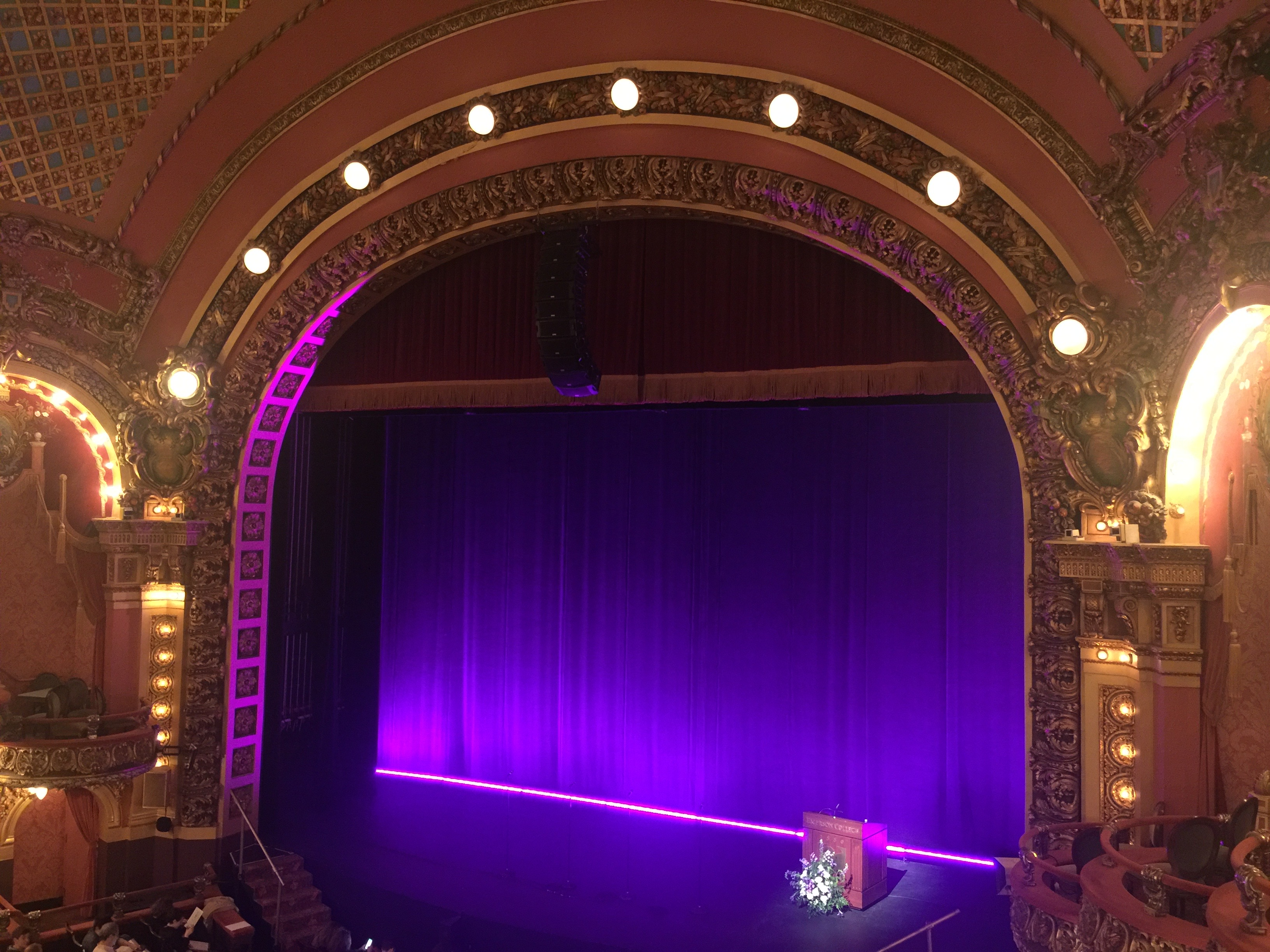
The Colonial Theater was acquired in 2006; Emerson College built 372 dormitory rooms on top of the building while preserving the theater.

John Zacharis became the tenth President of Emerson College and faced a college fractured by the failed move to Lawrence, Massachusetts. Over the course of two years, he worked to restore unity to the campus by purchasing a building at 180 Tremont Street, now called the Ansin Building. This purchase started a transition from Back Bay to the Boston Theater District. Zacharis went on medical leave in 1992 and died of leukemia shortly after.

During Zacharis's leave, Jacqueline Weis Liebergott, then the college's vice president and academic dean, was appointed as Acting President and a year later was inaugurated as the college's first female president. Shortly after, she submitted a 10-year master plan to the Boston Redevelopment Authority which involved moving the college to the Washington Street Theatre District.

In the mid-1990s, a planning document of the college's future plans was drafted and public hearings were held. The college also extended health care benefits to domestic partners of gay and lesbian faculty, administration and staff. Under the plan, dental coverage and tuition waivers were also available.

In December 1993, the college received a $100,000 gift from Mary E. Tufte, which funded its online debut in 1994. Financed by the contribution, The Tufte Lab was placed on the fourth floor of the Ansin Building and dedicated in Mrs. Tufte's honor. The lab was the catalyst for a telecommunications/fiber optic network installation, which was completed in October 1995.

In addition, the college announced the purchase and restoration of The Little Building (1994) across the street from the Ansin Building and next to Emerson's Majestic Theatre. Restoration work on the facades of the college's buildings at 126, 128, 130, 132–134, 168 Beacon Street, and 21 Commonwealth Avenue was completed in 1994 and 1995.

In 1998, Emerson purchased the Walker Building (Boston) at 120 Boylston. The building currently hosts the school's Department of Television, Radio, Film Production, the Institutional Advancement (Alumni and Development) department, and the Government and Community Relations department. It also contains the school's library and many of its classrooms.

=== Early 21st century (2000–2019) ===
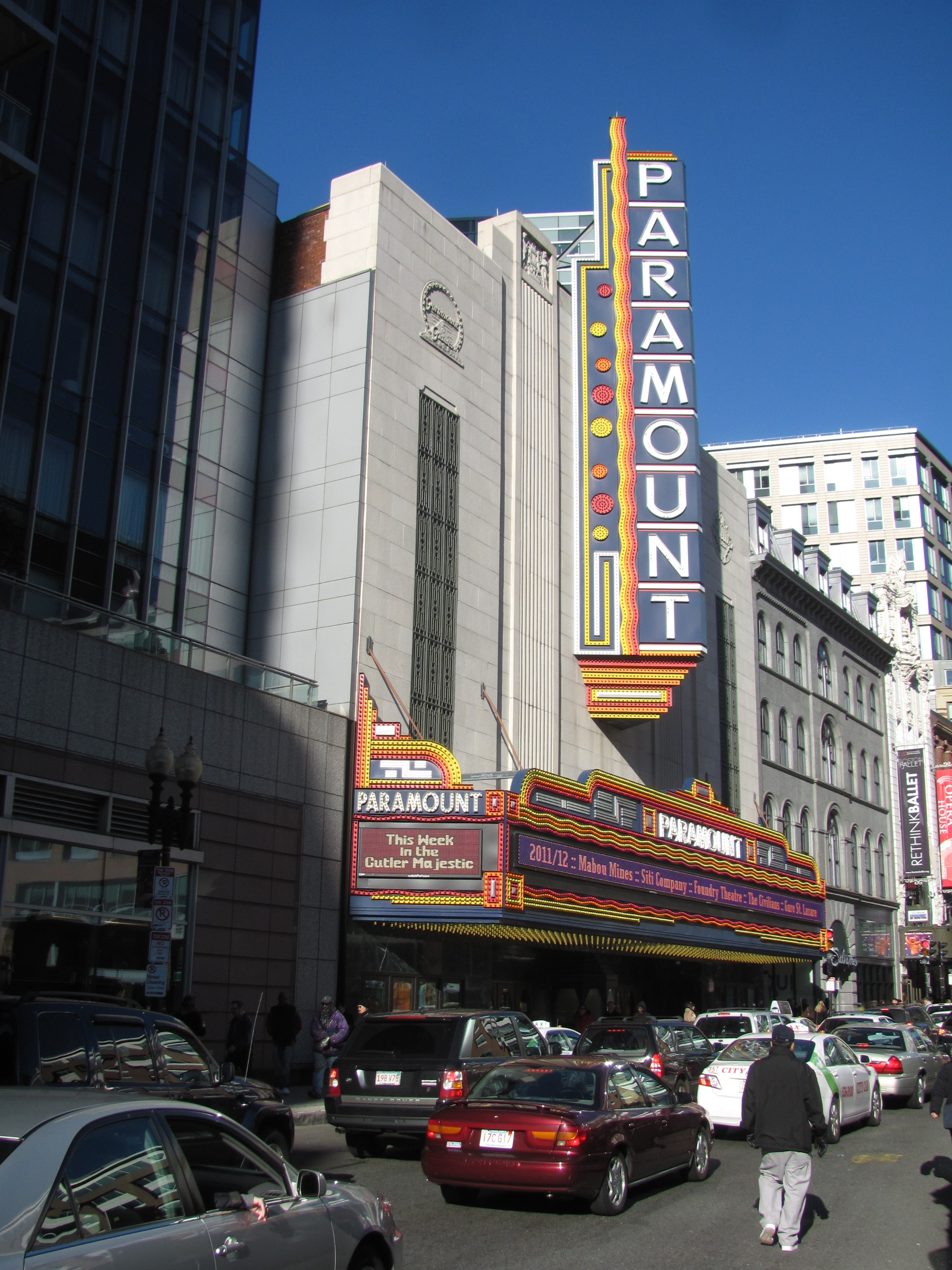
Emerson College purchased Paramount Theatre in 2005, and expanded its facilities.

The Tufte Performance Production Center (PPC) at 10 Boylston Place opened in 2003. The 11-story steel-and-glass building houses the Department of Performing Arts and includes two theaters (The Semel Theatre and The Greene Theatre), two television studios, makeup and costume labs, faculty offices, and an exhibition area. Also that year, the Cutler Majestic Theatre finished renovations and re-opened as one of the main stages of Emerson Stage productions.

Circa 2001 Emerson adjuncts voted to establish a union and in 2004 ratified its first contract with the college. The Affiliated Faculty of Emerson College, American Association of University Professors (AFEC-AAUP) represents 240 adjunct faculty members at Emerson College as of 2022.

In 2004, it was announced that the buildings at 96, 100, and 132 Beacon had been sold and would be vacated by the Fall 2006 semester. Construction of a new 14-story residence hall at 150 Boylston Street began in March 2004, and was completed in September 2006. It is the first entirely-new residence hall in Emerson's history. The facility includes residential suites, athletic facilities, offices and meeting rooms for student organizations, informal gathering places for off-campus students, spaces for small-group rehearsals and performances, and dining facilities.

The school purchased Boston's historic Paramount Theatre on Washington Street in 2005, with plans to build a new complex at the site including a 565-seat main stage theater inside the existing Paramount Theater and a 125-seat black box theater in an adjacent new building. Plans also included a 200-seat film screening room, eight rehearsal studios ranging from 700 to 1,900 square feet (65 to 177 m^{2}), six smaller rehearsal spaces, a sound stage for film students, a new scene shop, and a dormitory.

In May 2006, the Campus Center in the Piano Row building was named the Max Mutchnick Campus Center after a major gift from the 1987 graduate and co-creator of the television sitcom Will & Grace. In the same year, the school exercised its purchase option on the Colonial Theatre, adjacent to the Little Building, and then converted the upper floors of the building to a 372-bed dormitory. With the addition of dorm space here and at the Paramount Theatre, the school hoped to accommodate up to 75% of its students in on-campus housing by 2010.

In September 2006, a long-running labor dispute between the administrators and faculty union was resolved. The administration limited the union's role in promotion and tenure, and brought department chairs into administrative roles, where they were not covered by the union. In response, the college agreed not to dismantle the union.

In September 2007, students in Emerson Alliance for Gays, Lesbians, and Everyone (E.A.G.L.E.) as well as the Student Government Association (S.G.A.) received the gender neutral bathrooms they had pitched to the administration in the spring. In September 2016, every bathroom on Emerson's campus was converted into a gender inclusive restroom.

On December 2, 2009, President Liebergott announced she would step down in June 2011. On September 8, 2010, the college announced she would be succeeded by M. Lee Pelton of Willamette University.

On March 18, 2010, the newly renovated Paramount Center officially opened, with Boston Mayor Thomas M. Menino illuminating the Paramount's original art deco marquee, which Emerson had restored. In addition to the 590-seat Paramount Theatre, the Paramount Center also houses an experimental black box theater, the Bright Family Screening Room, a sound stage, a scene/prop production shop, nine rehearsal studios, six practice rooms, four classrooms, 20 faculty offices, and a student commons area.

In 2014, a student sued the college for negligence in an instance of sexual assault and failing to provide her her Title IX rights. A Massachusetts judge ruled in favor of Emerson in this lawsuit and the second one intitiated by the same student in 2017.

In late 2019, Marlboro College announced that it would merge with Emerson at the end of the 2019–20 academic year. Under the agreement, finalized on July 23, 2020, Marlboro gave its endowment to Emerson, which created the Marlboro Institute of Liberal Arts and Interdisciplinary Studies. Marlboro students were guaranteed admission and tenure-track faculty were guaranteed teaching positions at Emerson. At that time, Marlboro had approximately 150 students.

=== Post-COVID and onward (2020–present) ===
In December 2020, President Lee Pelton announced his planned departure from Emerson College in June 2021 to assume a new role as CEO and President of the Boston Foundation. Jay M. Bernhardt became the 13th president of Emerson College on June 1, 2023, after serving as dean of the Moody College of Communication at the University of Texas at Austin. Bernhardt's investiture ceremony at the Cutler Majestic Theatre on March 22, 2024, coincided with a pro-Palestinian demonstration. He told organizers they could demonstrate "immediately outside" the venue so long as doors stayed clear. When 12 students and one non-student were arrested for disturbing the peace, Bernhardt said the incident caused "deep distress and anxiety," reaffirmed that Emerson "cherish[es] respectful dialogue," and asked prosecutors to drop the charges.

A month later, on April 25, 2024, 118 people, including many Emerson students, were arrested after Boston Police cleared a Boylston Place Alley encampment on a public walkway that was part of the nationwide college protests against the Israel-Hamas War. In campus statements, Bernhardt noted that Emerson had urged the city to delay the sweep, sent staff to precincts, posted bail for students, cancelled classes so the community could process events, and pledged not to file campus disciplinary cases. On April 26th, 2024, the Student Government Association called for the resignation of President Bernhardt.

In March 2025, Emerson announced its 2025-2030 strategic plan, Extraordinary Emerson 2030.

== Campus ==
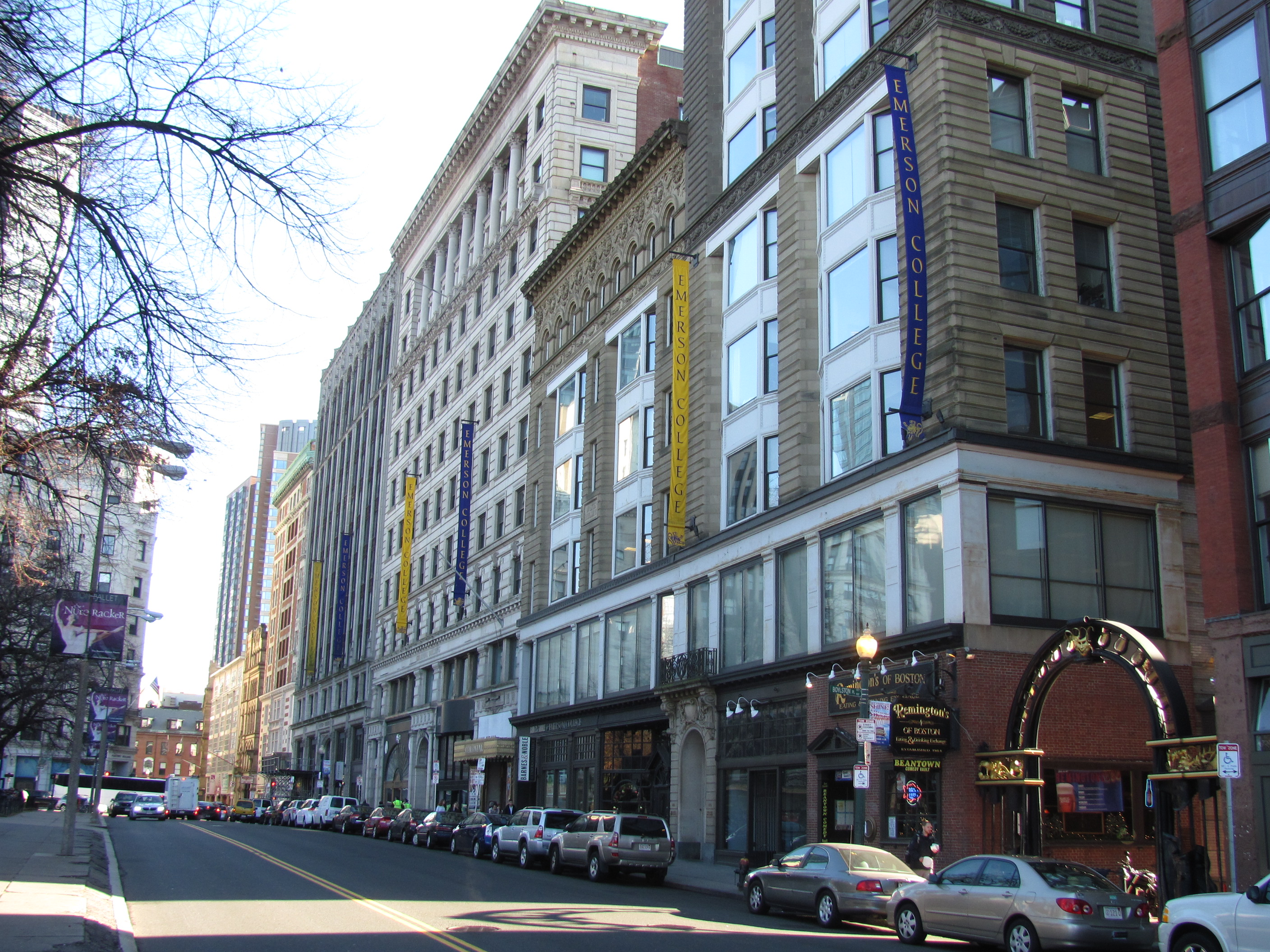
Emerson College occupies this row of buildings across from the corner of Boston Common.

Emerson College's permanent move from the Back Bay to its current location revitalized and preserved the distinct character and profiles of the surrounding neighborhoods, which comprise many significant historic landmarks and structures—the most notable being Boston Public Garden and Boston Common. Presently, the majority of the college's acquired properties were reclaimed, renovated and/or restored without having to introduce new developments into the Downtown core. Abutting the southeast corner of the Boston Common, the 8-acre urban campus at the intersection of Boylston Street and Tremont Street is served by Boylston station on the MBTA Green Line and Chinatown station on the Orange Line. In addition, Emerson College extends its campus outside Massachusetts state, operating in a fourteenth-century castle in the Netherlands and a major academic center on Sunset Boulevard in Hollywood for its long-established Los Angeles program.

=== Academic and theater buildings ===
==== Ansin Building (180 Tremont Street) ====
Once owned by the Boston Edison Company, the Ansin Building was purchased by Emerson in 1992. The building stands 14 stories high and contains all Visual & Media Arts (VMA) labs and facilities, offices for all VMA and Writing, Literature & Publishing (WLP) departments, and is the home of WERS, WECB, and ETIN (Emerson's Talk and Information Network, an online radio service). It also contains the registrar's office, Tufte and 3D computer labs, Digital Production labs, and the Media Services center.

==== 216 Tremont Street ====
The former Union Bank building at 216 Tremont Street houses the Department of Communication Sciences and Disorders and the in-house clinic, The Robbins Speech, Language and Hearing Center. Also located here are the offices of Student Financial Services, Health Services, Career Services, the Counseling Center and the International Student Center. The Bill Bordy Theater and Auditorium on the ground floor is used for lectures, performances, performance classes and special events.

==== Walker Building (120 Boylston Street) ====
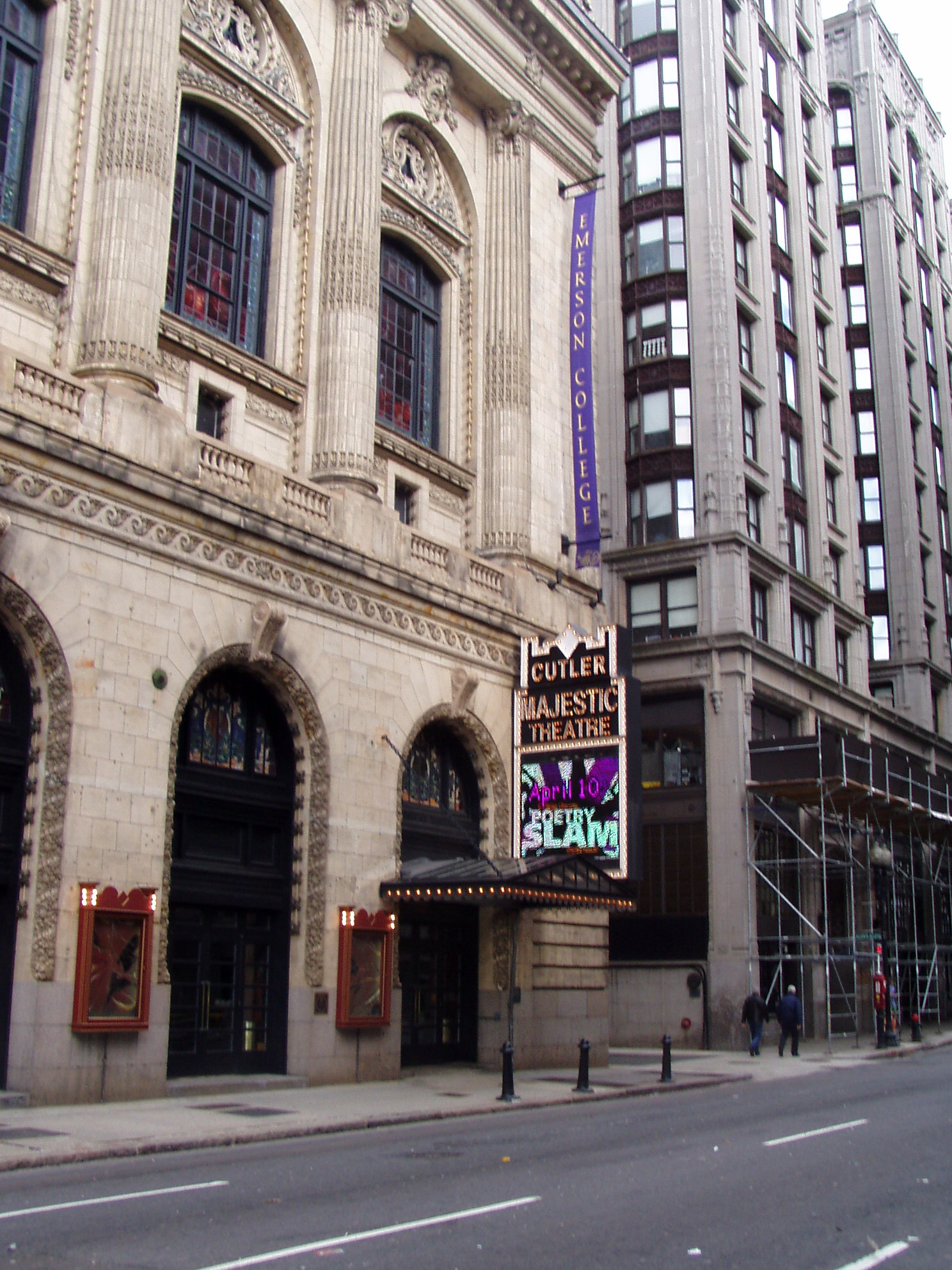
The Cutler Majestic Theatre, opened in 1903, is listed on the National Register of Historic Places.

Provides classrooms, study rooms, offices to various non-academic and academic departments, five computer labs, and the Iwasaki Library. The fifth and sixth floors connect to the Tufte building.

Computer labs: Advanced Projects Lab (APL), Advanced Teaching Lab (ATL), Communication & Marketing Labs (CML) 1, 2, and Journalism Lab (JRL)
Production facilities: Newsroom TV Studio, Newsroom Editing Labs
Academic facilities: Iwasaki Library, Emerson College Archives and Special Collections

One of the sets of popular NBC sitcom Will & Grace (1998–2006, 2017–2020), donated by Emerson alumnus Max Mutchnick, was displayed in the Iwasaki Library. The set, Will and Grace's living room and kitchen, remained in the library until 2013, when it was moved to Emerson's Los Angeles campus.

==== Tufte Performance Production Center (10 Boylston Place) ====
The 11-story building is home to two television studios, two performing art theaters, the Huret and Spector Gallery, set and costume studios, classrooms, and the offices of the Department of Performing Arts. The fifth and sixth floors of the building are connected to the Walker Building.

Computer labs: CAD Lab
Performance theaters and facilities: Semel Theatre, The Kermit and Elinore Greene Theater, The Bobbi Brown and Steven Plofker Design Technology and Makeup Studio
Television studio and facilities: Di Bona Television Studio & Control Room, Studio B & Control Room

==== Cutler Majestic Theatre (219 Tremont Street) ====
The Cutler Majestic Theatre is home to ArtsEmerson and Emerson Stage productions each year, various speaking events, Open House, and the EVVY Awards, Emerson's own award show and the largest student-run live television production in the country.

==== Paramount Center (555 Washington Street) ====
Opening in 1932 as a movie theatre seating 1,700, the Paramount Center was one of the first movie houses in Boston to play talking motion pictures. In 2005, Emerson College announced plans to renovate the Paramount Theatre, building an entire performing arts facility in and around the theatre. The renovated Paramount Center was designed by Elkus Manfredi Architects of Boston and built by Bond Brothers, and completed in 2010.

The project included not only renovating the Paramount Theatre into a 550-seat theater, but building both a new Performance Development Center and a new residence hall for the school on the 6th through 9th floors of the building. The complex features the 120-seat Liebergott Black Box Theatre, the 174-seat Bright Family Screening Room, nine rehearsal studios ranging from 700 to 1,900 square feet (65 to 177 m^{2}), five practice rooms for individuals and small groups, a sound stage for film production classes, a scene shop, several classrooms, a restaurant, and Emerson faculty and staff offices.

==== Piano Row (150 Boylston Street) ====
Piano row is a 14-story building that houses 558 students in double occupancy rooms within four and six-person suites. Inside the building students can find The Max Mutchnick Campus Center and the Bobbi Brown and Steven Plofker Gymnasium are important campus buildings. The former features several conference, meeting, and rehearsal spaces open to all students, offices for Student Life and the Student Government Association, and storage for any student organization. Also housing new offices for the Athletics Department, it is Emerson College's first-ever indoor athletic facility. The construction of the gym was controversial at the time of its announcement, considering the lack of performing space on campus and the lack of enthusiasm around athletics at Emerson.

==== Little Building (80 Boylston Street) ====
Emerson College purchased the building in 1994 and converted it into a 750-bed dormitory, which opened in September 1995. In 2016, the college unveiled plans to do a complete renovation of the Little Building, which would replace and restore the building's façade and add an additional floor behind the parapet on the top of the building, adding approximately 300 beds. The renovated dorm opened for the Fall 2019 semester and now houses up to 1,035 residents.

The Little Building is home to the school's Student Performance Center, commonly known as the SPC. Located on the Lower Level of the building the space is home to the Judee Wales Watson Theater (formerly the SPC Theatre) and the SPC Black Box, as well as two dance studios, three rehearsal rooms, and a production space.

==== 2 Boylston Place ====
2 Boylston Place opened in 2017, and contains an 18-story residence hall that houses approximately 375 students.

==== 172 Tremont Street ====
172 Tremont Street, opened in 2019. It connects the Paramount Center and Avery Street spaces with the main campus at the intersection of Tremont and Boylston streets. It houses administrative offices, including the Cultural Engagement Center and the Center for Spiritual Life, as well as space for student organizations.

==== Cutler-Winn Commons (186 Tremont Street) ====
The Cutler-Winn Commons opened in September of 2026 to serve as a third space for Emerson students. Sitting on the North-Eastern corner of the Boylston-Tremont intersection. The commons feature rows of cozy booths with some snacks for purchase, and a small stage for student performances. The space, formerly Guy Fieri’s Boston Kitchen, has been affectionately titled by some students “The Guy Fieri Memorial Commons.”

=== External programs ===
==== ELA—Hollywood Center (Los Angeles) ====
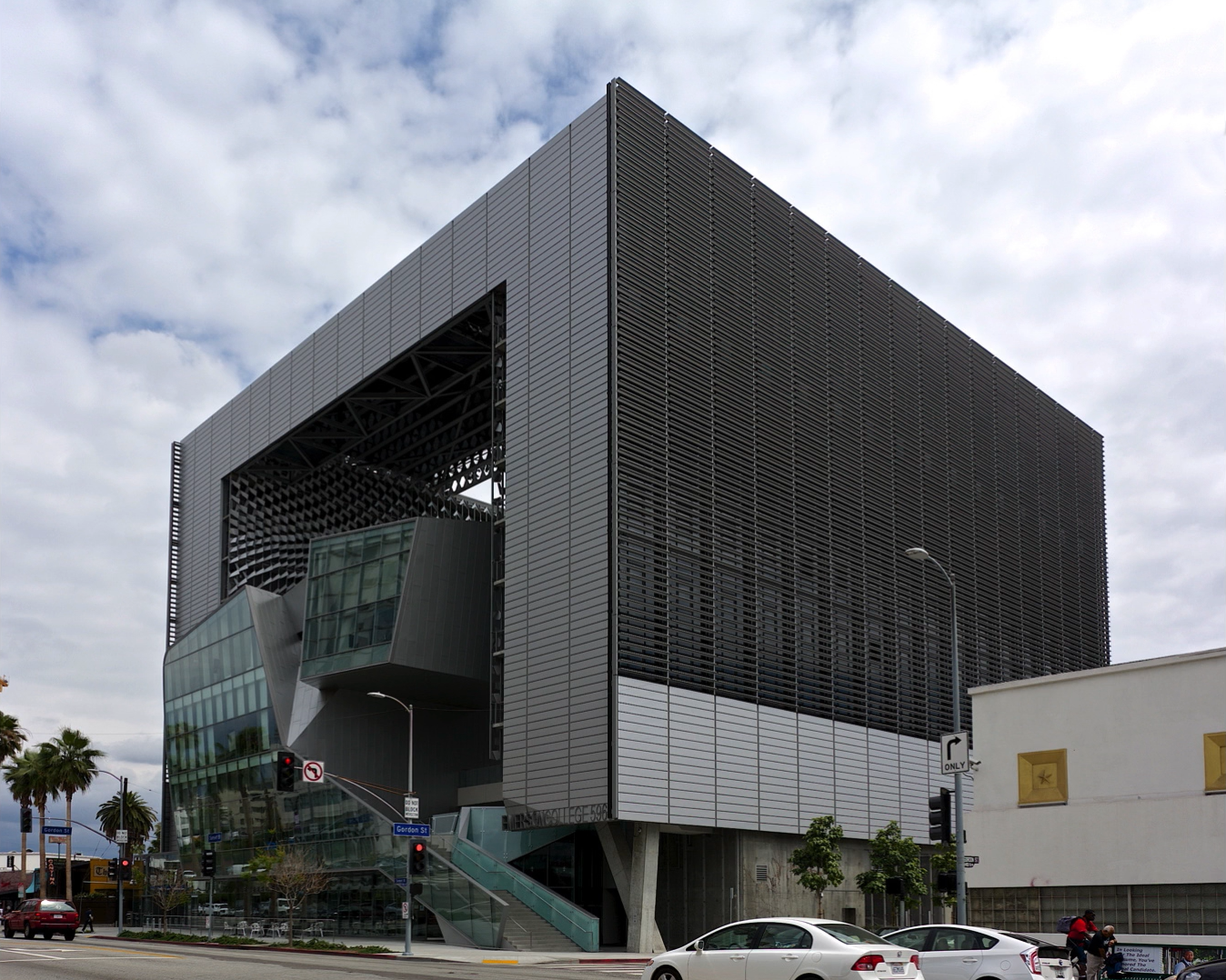
Emerson Los Angeles center, opened in 2014, serves as the college's West Coast campus.

Situated on Sunset Boulevard (at Gordon St) in Hollywood, the Emerson Los Angeles (ELA) building is a permanent home to Emerson's decades-old Los Angeles program. The international design firm Morphosis, headed by Pritzker Prize-winning architect Thom Mayne, designed a signature building incorporating residential, teaching and administrative spaces. The 10-story building was opened for the college's winter semester in 2014. The new facility accommodates 217 students, approximately twice the number of students that were supported by Emerson's older facility in Burbank. The center allows undergraduate students to spend a full fall, spring or summer semester taking classes in Hollywood and participating in a semester-long internship at enterprises related to their field of study. In addition, ELA also offers professional training and workplace education for Los Angeles-area professionals who are not enrolled in the college degree programs.

In late 2025, Emerson College named Emerson alumnus Kenneth Rogers as the inaugural dean of ELA, with his appointment beginning in February 2026.

==== Kasteel Well in the Netherlands ====
Emerson College owns and operates Kasteel Well in the province of Limburg, Netherlands, a national historical monument that provides living accommodations, classrooms, a resource center, and related facilities. Approximately 85 matriculated Emerson students attend the program each semester, and are chosen through a lottery-style system. Classes are taught by Dutch teachers, with several Belgian, German and other teachers from Europe on staff. Each semester Emerson brings the students in residence on A faculty-led, multi-day excursion to Amsterdam and to one other European capital, such as: Prague, Venice, Rome, Madrid, Berlin, Milan, Dublin, or Barcelona.

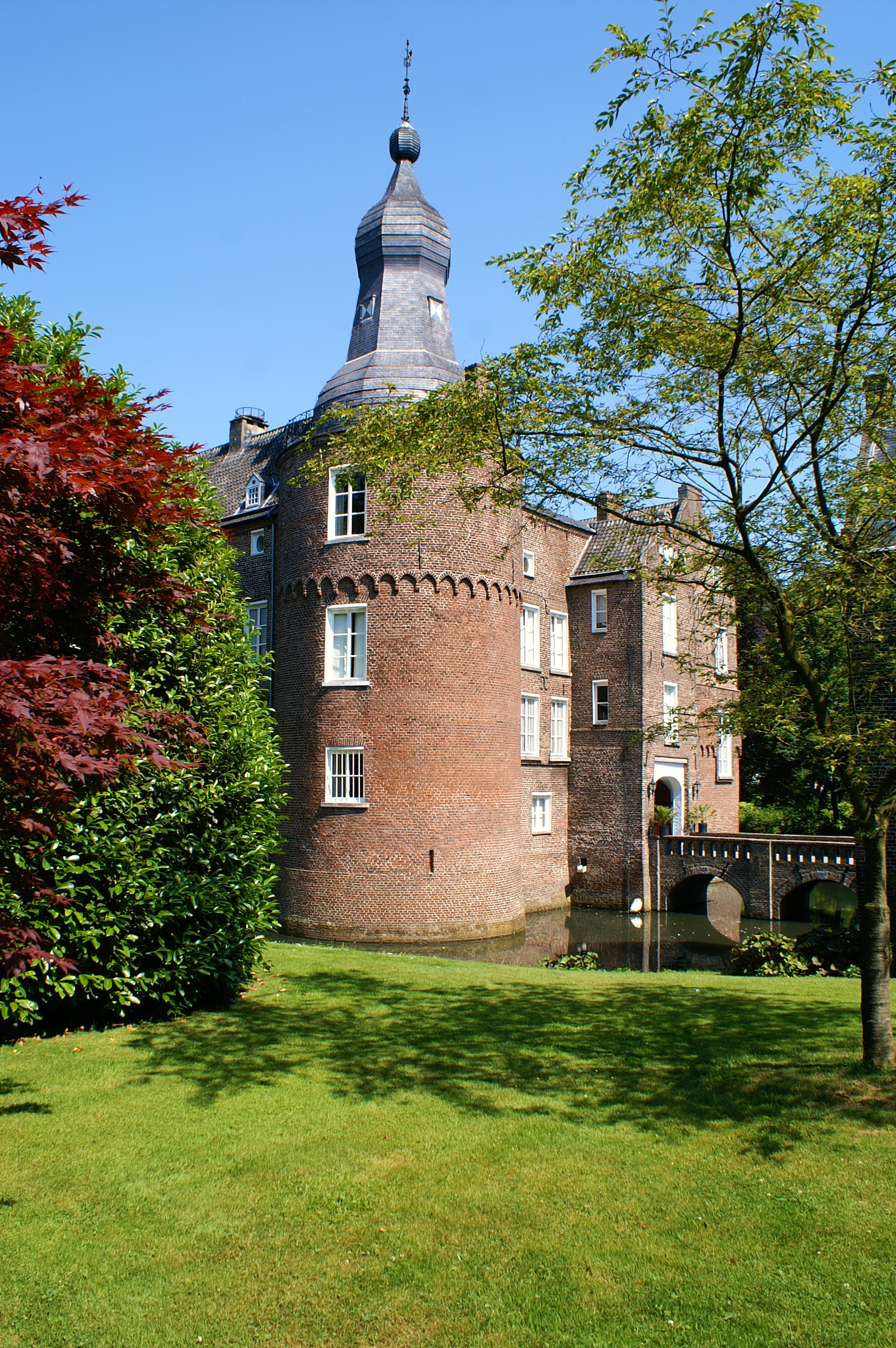
A restored 14th-century medieval castle is home to Emerson College's education abroad program in Well, Netherlands.

== Academics ==
Academic rankings

Master's
- Washington Monthly: 321

Regional
- U.S. News & World Report: 19

National
- Forbes: 222
- WSJ/College Pulse: 501–600

Emerson College is divided into three schools, the School of Communication, School of Film, Television, and Media Arts, and School of Arts and Interdisciplinary Studies, as well as eight departments offering 27 undergraduate majors and 41 minors (Bachelor of Arts/Fine Arts, or Science), and 15 graduate degree programs (Master of Arts/Fine Arts, or Science). The school also offers five 4+1 Bachelor’s to Master’s Programs that allows Emerson undergrads to earn a master’s degree in just one additional year by taking graduate-level courses beginning your senior year.Though the college's programs are primarily focused on communications and the arts, the curriculum is delivered through a liberal arts and sciences education model, where students are required to take courses from other academic disciplines and also have the opportunity to declare a minor outside their major.

In 2018, Emerson admitted 36% of applicants, and was ranked 6th in the Universities-Master's (North) category according to U.S. News & World Report. There were 3,871 undergraduate and 1,048 graduate students as of 2019.

=== Film ===
Emerson College has an extensive film program that is one of the largest in the United States. In 2008–2009, it awarded 368 degrees in film, Radio, and Television. In August 2022, Emerson's Visual and Media Arts program was rated #6 in the nation by The Hollywood Reporter. Along with its VMA program, Emerson also operates a joint degree program with Paris College of Art in the 17th arrondissement of Paris, France called the Global BFA in Film Art. This program opened in 2019.

== Athletics ==
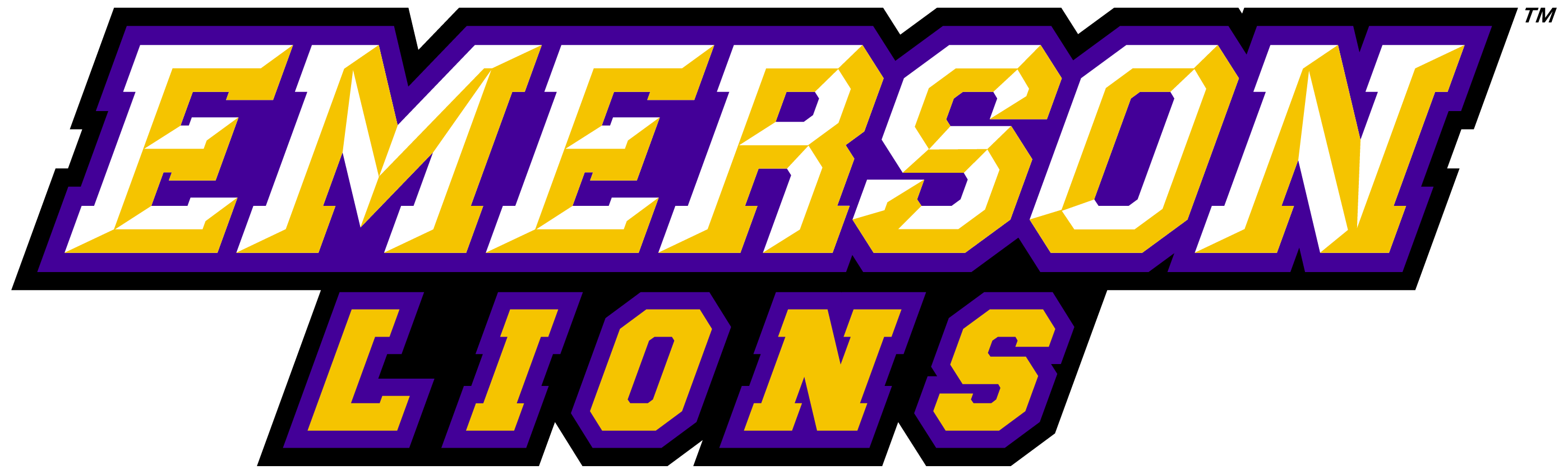
Emerson Lions wordmark

The college is a member of the National Collegiate Athletic Association (Division III), the Eastern College Athletic Conference (ECAC), and the New England Women's and Men's Athletic Conference (NEWMAC). Emerson previously competed as a charter member of the Great Northeast Athletic Conference (GNAC) from 1995 to 2013. The college was also a charter member of the Commonwealth Coast Conference (CCC), which it competed in from 1984 to 1989. The athletics department has men's and women's lacrosse, tennis, basketball, cross country running, golf, volleyball and soccer teams, in addition to a women's softball team and a men's baseball team.

The women's softball team defeated Western New England College in 2007 to clinch the GNAC championship and earn the department's first appearance in the NCAA tournament. In 2012, Emerson's women's volleyball team defeated Rivier to become the 2012 GNAC Champions. In 2019, the men's basketball team won its first NEWMAC title in program history. In 2022 the women's soccer team defeated Clark University to clinch the NEWMAC title.

== Student organizations ==
Emerson College offers over 100 student organizations under its Student Engagement & Leadership department, most of which are highly active and diverse ranging from curriculum-based activities to social action organizations. Organizations are either maintained by Student-Led Executive Boards, the Student Government Association or by campus departments (if the organizations are managed by faculty or staff).

=== The EVVY Awards ===
The largest student-run multi-camera production in the nation, the EVVY Awards, are Emerson College's annual award show. Judged by industry professionals, The EVVYs recognize Emerson students' achievements in their chosen discipline. Each May the show is broadcast live from the Cutler Majestic Theatre. More than 500 students are annually involved with the EVVY Awards. The organization is run entirely by Emerson students, and advised by staff members.

The 31st and 33rd Annual EVVY Awards won the College Television Award for Alternative/Variety programming.

=== Emerson Channel (EmChan) ===
The Emerson Channel is Emerson College's television station. The channel was created in 1999 under the Television, Radio, and Film Department. The organization is managed by a full-time staff member and is run by Emerson College Students. Student works regularly receive collegiate EVVY awards.

=== Emerson Independent Video (EIV) ===
EIV was founded in 1975 and is Emerson's largest entirely student run organization. EIV funds and assists in the production of live news, teleplays, single camera narratives, and other shows selected by the student management board from proposals made by fellow students at the end of each semester. EIV is known for their Emmy and AP Award-winning show, EIV News at 9p, as well as their pre-taped Evening News broadcast.

=== Student Magazines and Newspapers ===
==== Emertainment Monthly ====
Emertainment Monthly is Emerson College's official entertainment magazine. Modeled after professional entertainment journalism outlets like Entertainment Weekly, Emertainment Monthly has been nominated for several EVVY Awards and participates in major entertainment events as official members of the press. Emertainment Monthly received the title of Best in Show in the "Website Small School" Category by the Associated Collegiate Press in 2015.

==== The Berkeley Beacon ====
The Berkeley Beacon is Emerson's student-run, weekly print newspaper. In 2012, it became the first collegiate newspaper website with a responsive design. It received the titles of Best in Show in the "Four-Year Weekly" and "Website Small School" categories by the Associated Collegiate Press in 2015. In 2025, the Beacon was ranked the second best college newspaper in the country by The Princeton Review, finishing behind Columbia University's Daily Spectator.

=== Student performance organizations ===
The college has several student groups focused on theater productions. This includes the BlueJay Theatre Collective, the college's newest founded in 2023; the emShakes Theatre Co. that focuses on Shakespeare and classic works "with a twist"; Kidding Around, focused on theatre for young audiences (TYA) and intergenerational audiences; the Mercutio Troupe, founded in 1972 as an all female Shakespeare group; turned into an organizations that focuses on creating art that test political intrigue. The RareWorks Theatre Company that produces new works and underrepresented plays; and a student-led subsect of Boston's CHUANG Stage, Boston's Asian American theatre company in residence at the Boston Center for the Arts (BCA). The college also dance troupes such as the Emerson Dance Company and the Emerson Urban Dance Theatre. The group was founded in 2006 by Michael Love as a way bring styles like hip-hop, street jazz, and rhythm tap to Emerson audiences.

=== Student radio ===
WECB is the campus student run radio station, overseen by a faculty advisor. WECB broadcasts online at its website and on closed-circuit campus television (channel 56).

In 1982, WECB was scheduled for demolition without reconstruction, as part of the Mass Communications $1.6M renovation project. Carol Kamerschen, Greg Weremey, Barry Scott and Russ Weisenbacher were instrumental in fighting the board of trustees, and convincing them to allow Weremey and Weisenbacher to design and build new studios at 126 Beacon Street, replacing the former facilities at 130 Beacon Street, 4th floor.

ETIN (Emerson's Talk and Information Network), an online talk radio service run by students, is also housed in the same space as WERS and WECB.

=== Comedy troupes ===
The college has a long tradition in the comedy community, including student groups specializing in various combinations of sketch comedy, improvisation, and short films. There are twelve recognized comedy organizations: Emerson Comedy Workshop, Chocolate Cake City, Inside Joke, Jimmy's Traveling All-Stars, Derbyn Comedy, This is Pathetic, Stroopwafel, SwoMo Comedy, The Girlie Project, A Goose Troupe, Stand-Up in the Park, and Flawed Comedy. Several comedy classes, including "Comedy Writing for Television," "Intermediate Creative Writing: Comedy," and "Comedy Writers' Room" are a regular part of the curriculum. In September 2016, the college began offering a B.F.A. in Comedic Arts, claiming it to be "the first degree of its kind in the country."

The college is also home to the American Comedy Archives, established in 2005 to "acquire, preserve and make available primary source material that documents the professional activities of the ground breaking individuals who have written, produced or performed comedy for radio, television, motion pictures or live performance".

== List of presidents ==
- Charles Wesley Emerson (1880–1903)
- William James Rolphe (1903–08)
- Henry Lawrence Southwick (1908–32)
- Harry S. Ross (1932–45)
- Boylston Green (1945–49)
- Samuel Justus McKinley (1949–67)
- Richard Chapin (1967–75)
- Gus Turbeville (1975–77)
- Oliver Woodruff (1977–79)
- Allen E. Koenig (1979–89)
- John Zacharis (1989–92)
- Jacqueline Liebergott (1992–2011)
- M. Lee Pelton (2011–2021)
- William Gilligan (Interim president, 2021–2023)
- Jay Bernhardt (2023–present)

== Notable people ==
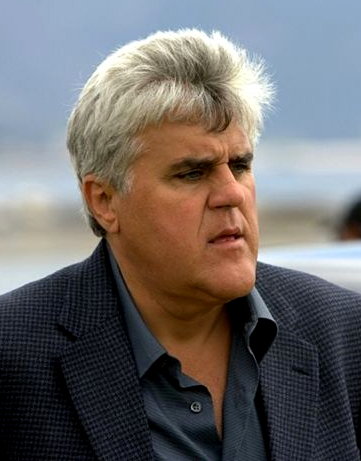
Jay Leno,
comedian and former host of The Tonight Show
(B.A.)

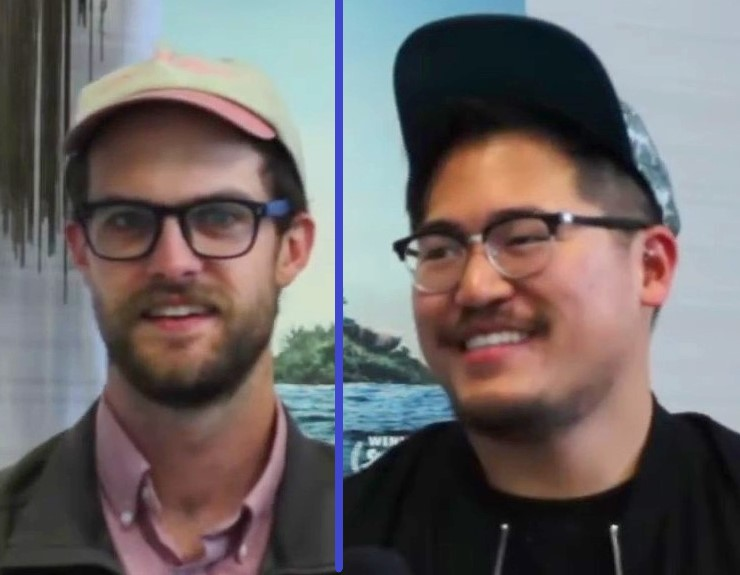
Daniel Scheinert & Daniel Kwan, writers and directors of the Oscar-winning film Everything Everywhere All At Once.

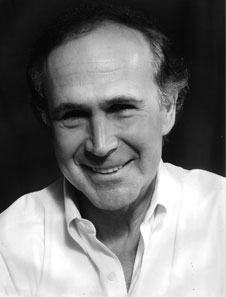
Morton Dean,
journalist and former television anchor for CBS Evening News
(B.A.)

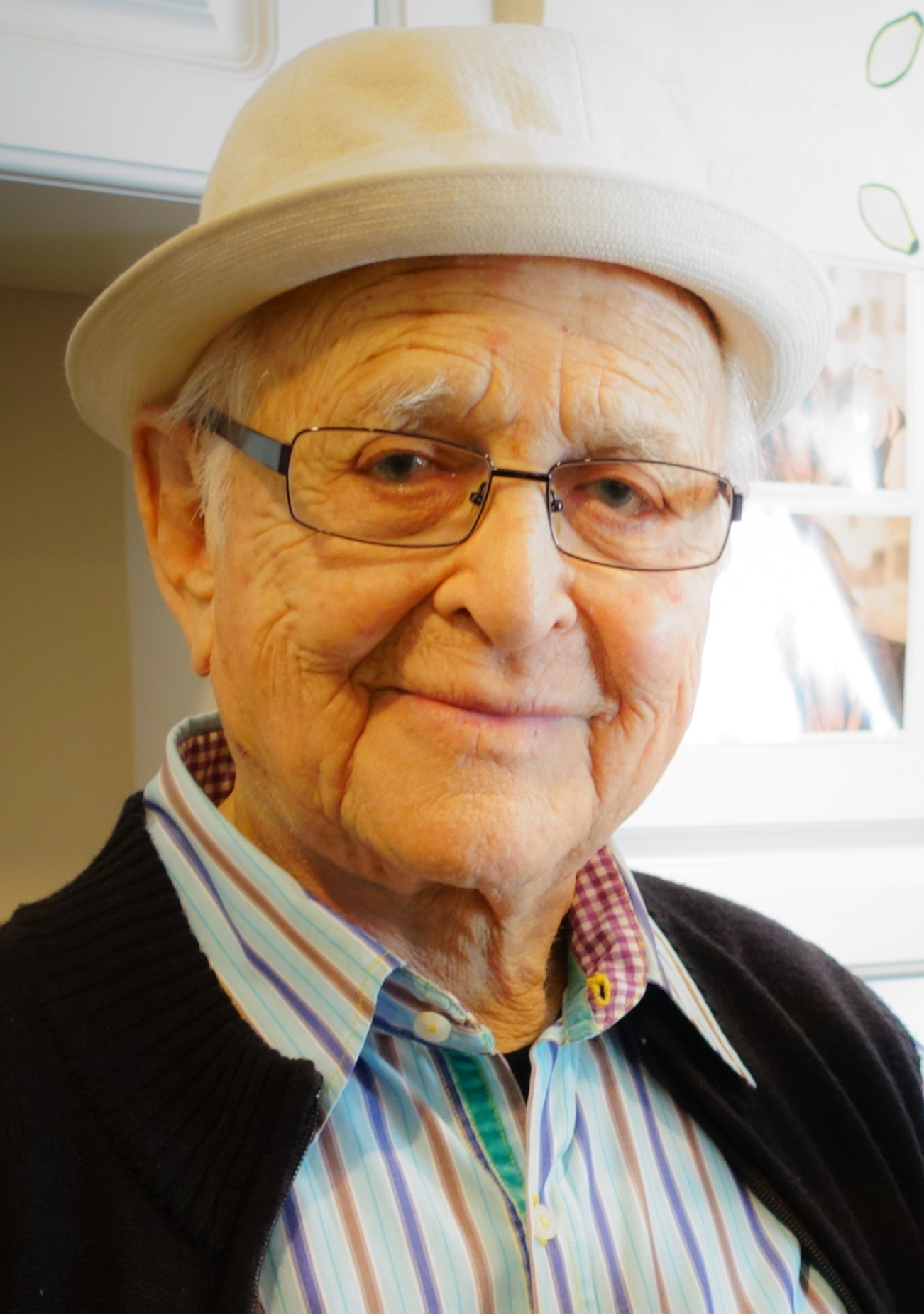
Norman Lear,
television producer known for All in the Family, The Jeffersons and Good Times
(did not graduate)

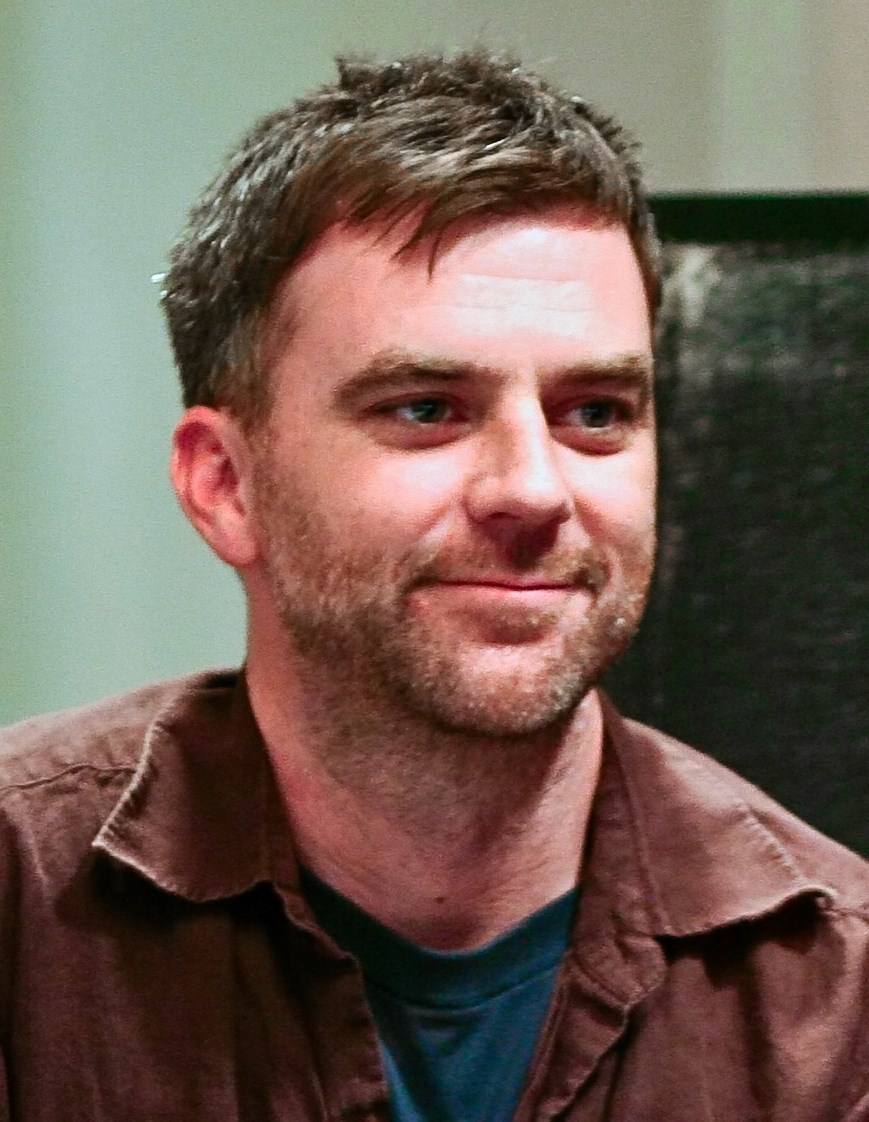
Paul Thomas Anderson,
filmmaker known for Boogie Nights, Magnolia and There Will Be Blood
(did not graduate)

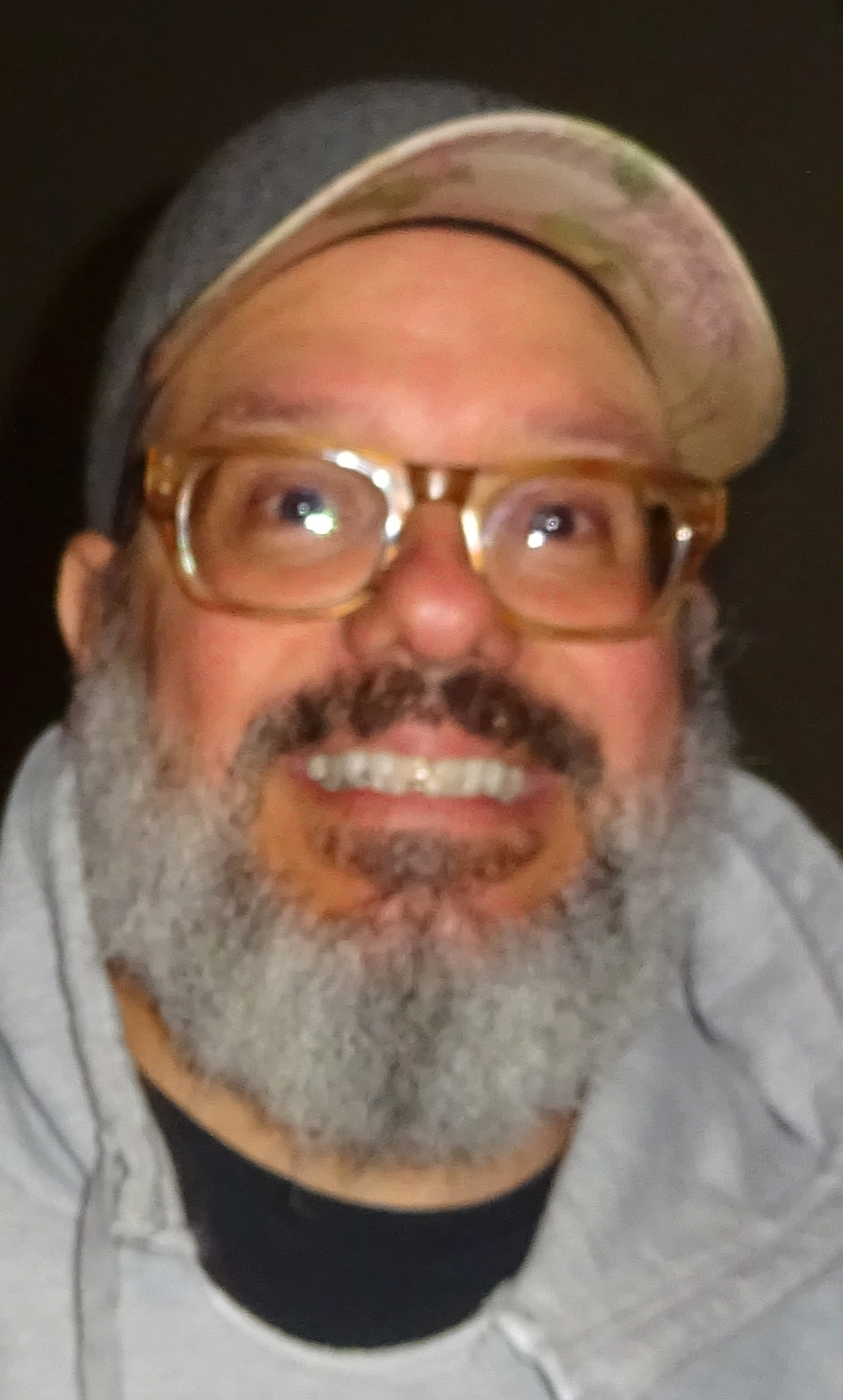
David Cross,
comedian and actor known for Mr. Show and Arrested Development
(did not graduate)

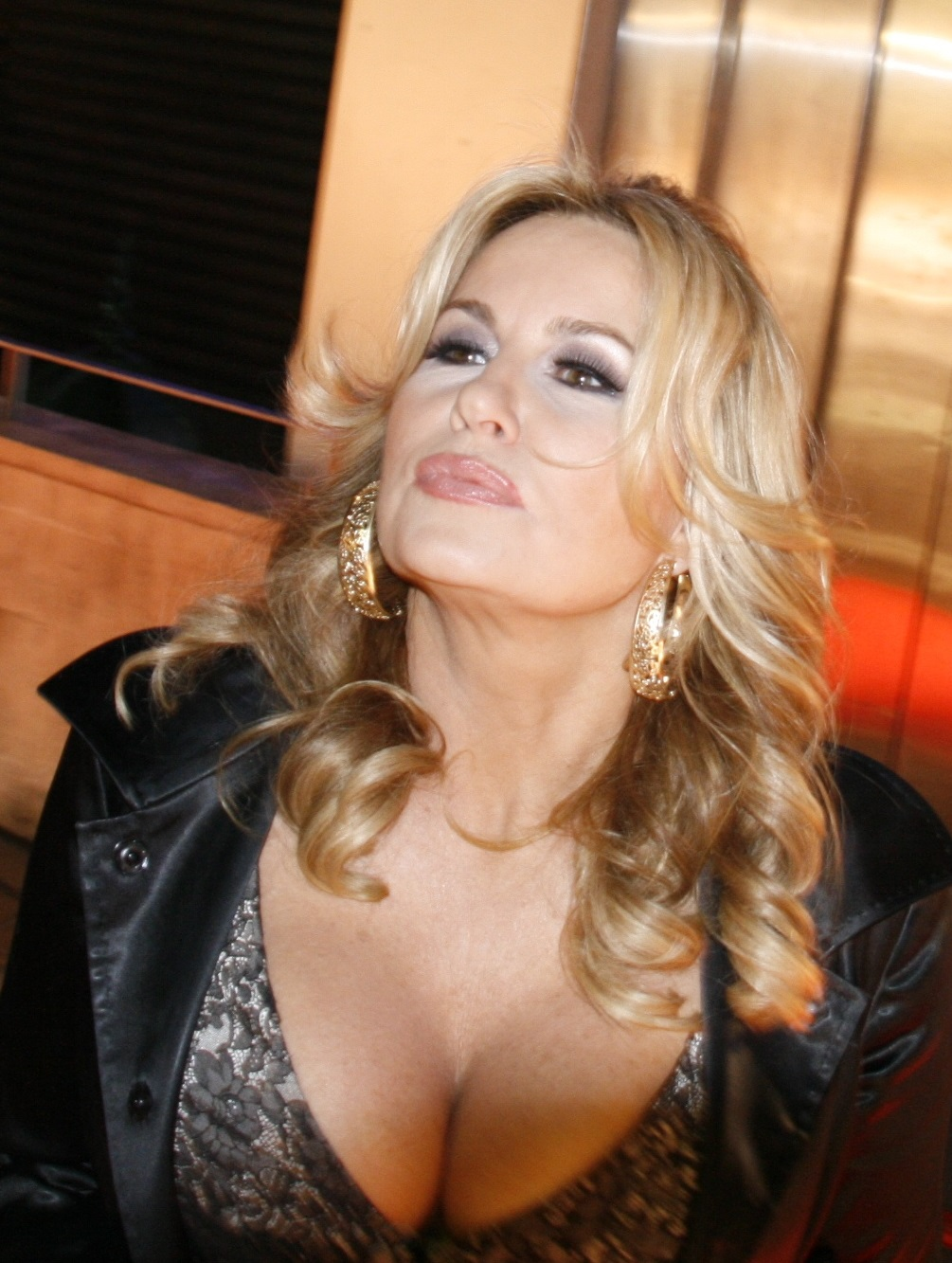
Jennifer Coolidge,
comedian and actress known for American Pie and Legally Blonde
(B.A.)

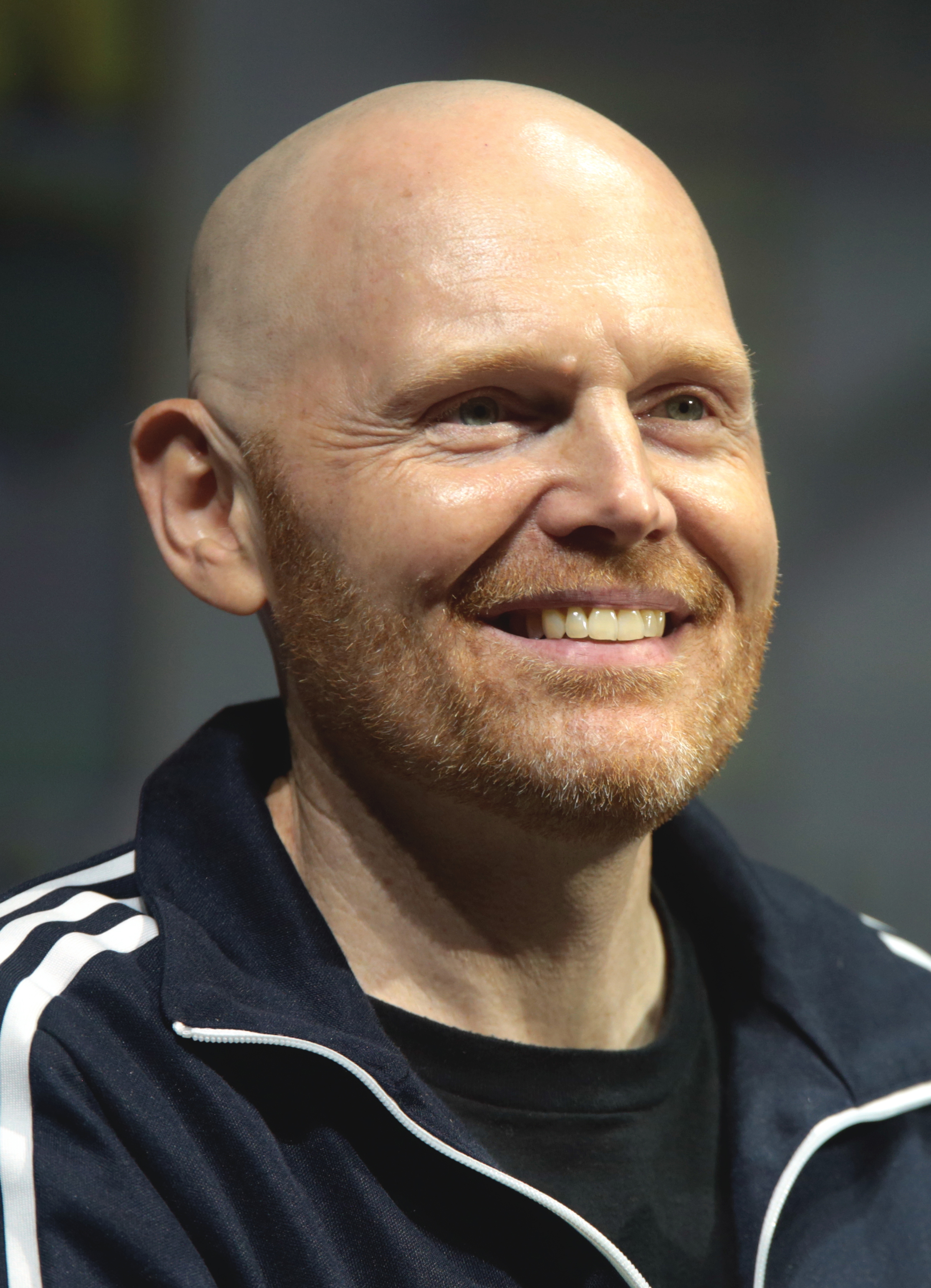
Bill Burr,
comedian and actor known for Paper Tiger and Breaking Bad
and Riyadh Comedy Festival
(B.A.)

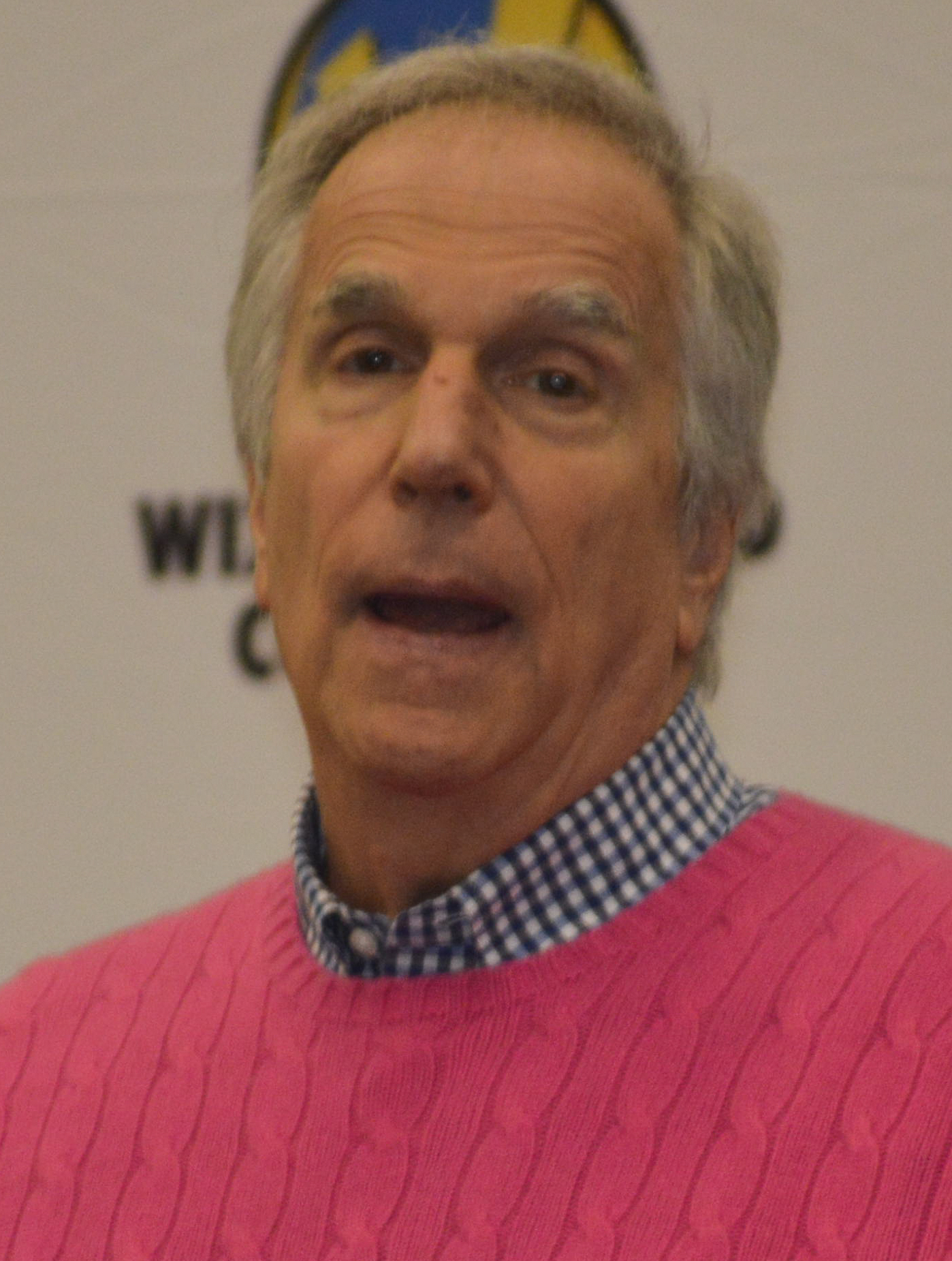
Henry Winkler,
actor known for Happy Days, Arrested Development, and Barry
(B.A.)

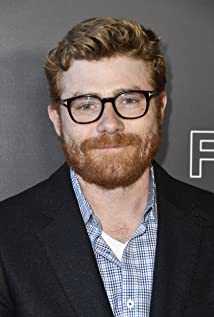
Erik Messerschmidt,
cinematographer known for Mank and Mindhunter
(B.F.A.)

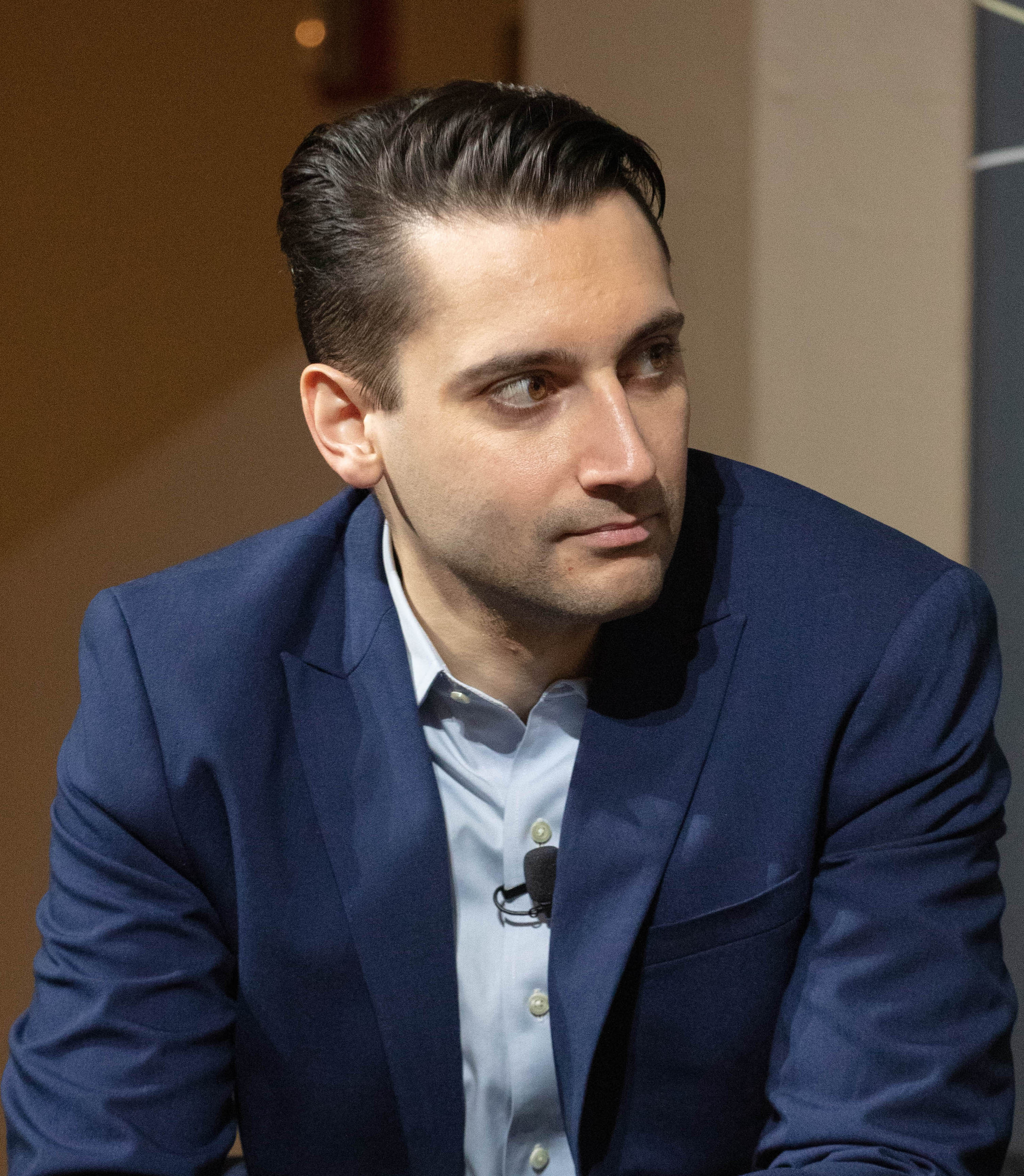
Ben Collins,
reporter for NBC News and The Daily Beast
(B.S.)

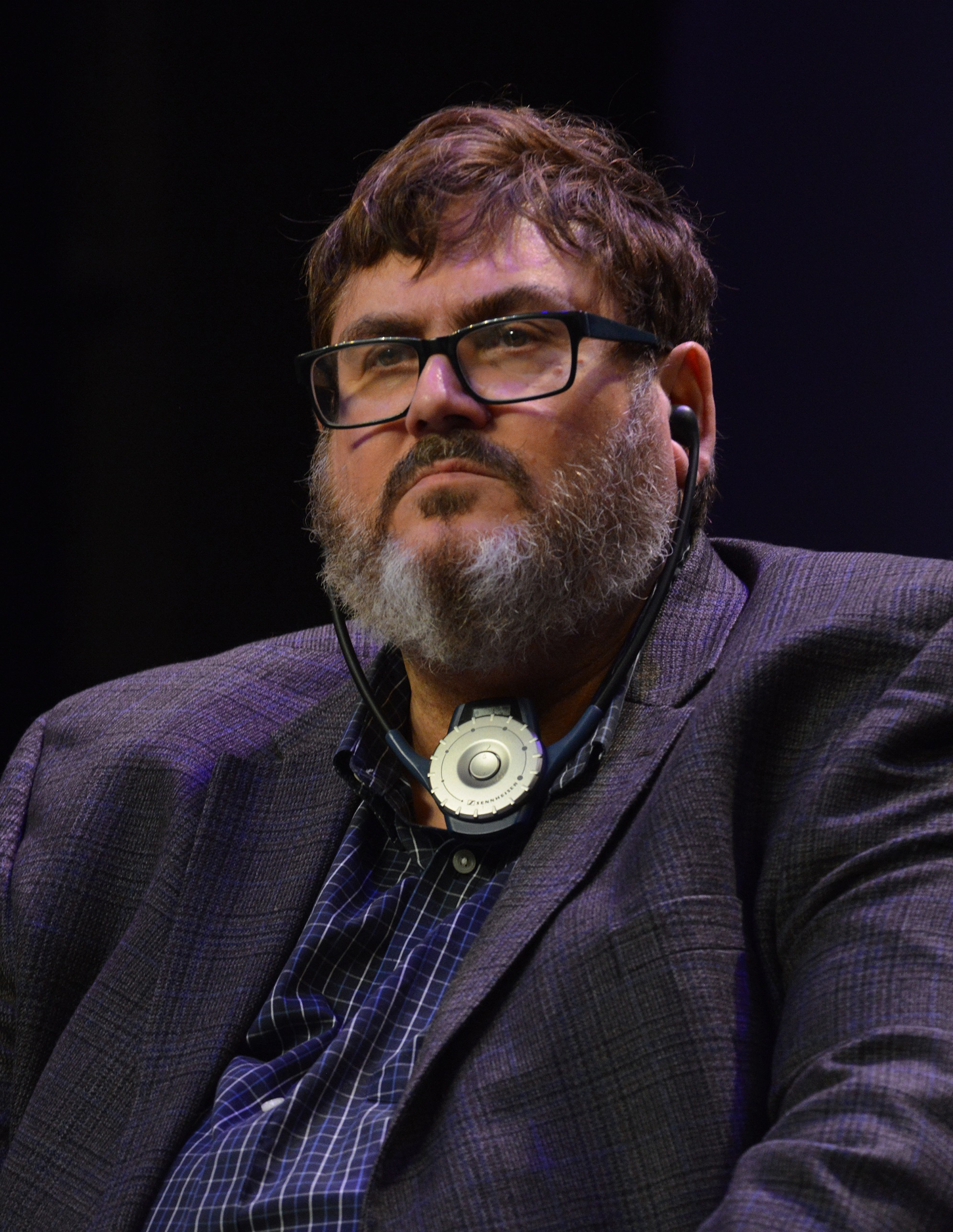
Paul Dini,
screenwriter and co-creator of Batman: The Animated Series
(B.F.A.)

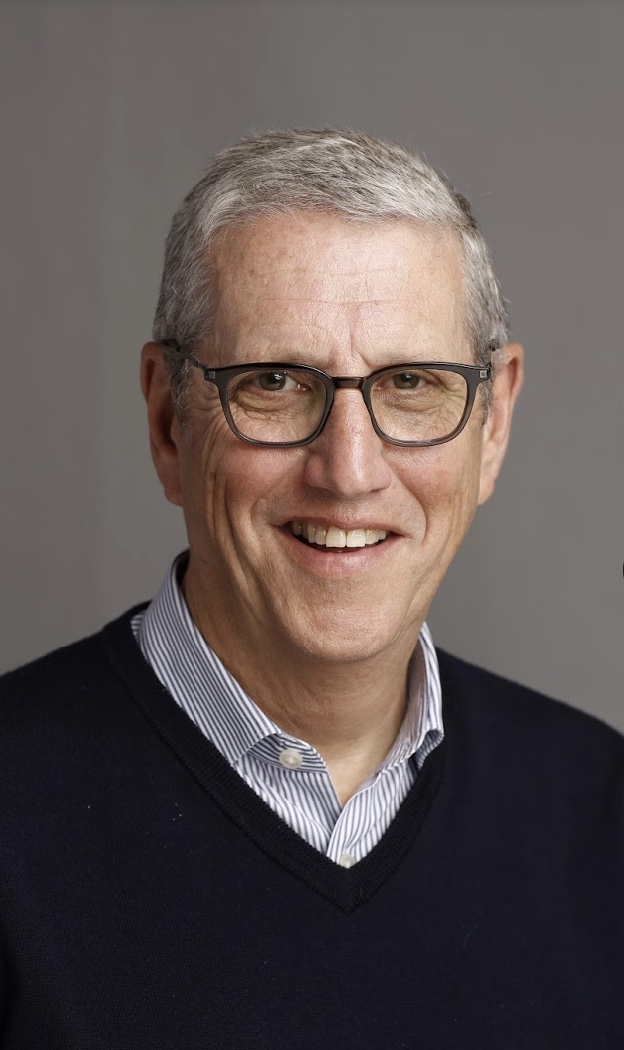
Doug Herzog,
former president of MTV Networks
(B.S.)

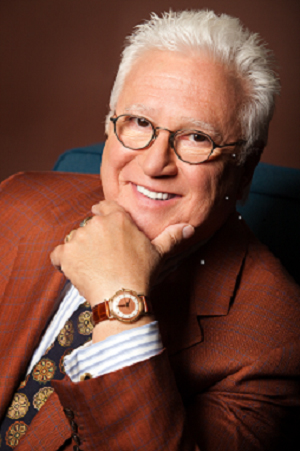
Vin Di Bona,
producer of MacGyver, Entertainment Tonight, and America's Funniest Home Videos
(B.A.)

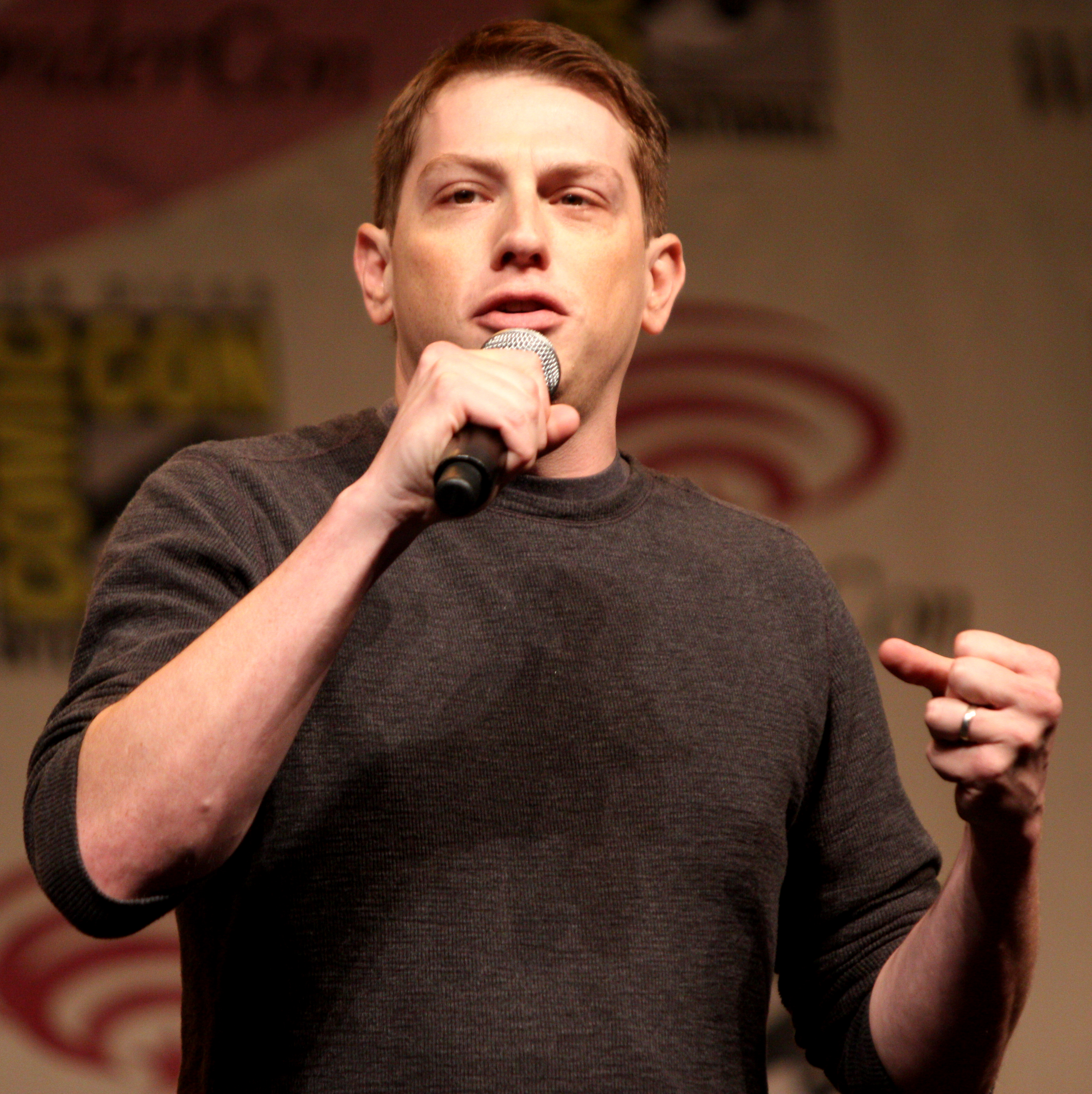
Seth Grahame-Smith,
novelist known for Pride and Prejudice and Zombies and Abraham Lincoln Vampire Hunter
(B.A.)

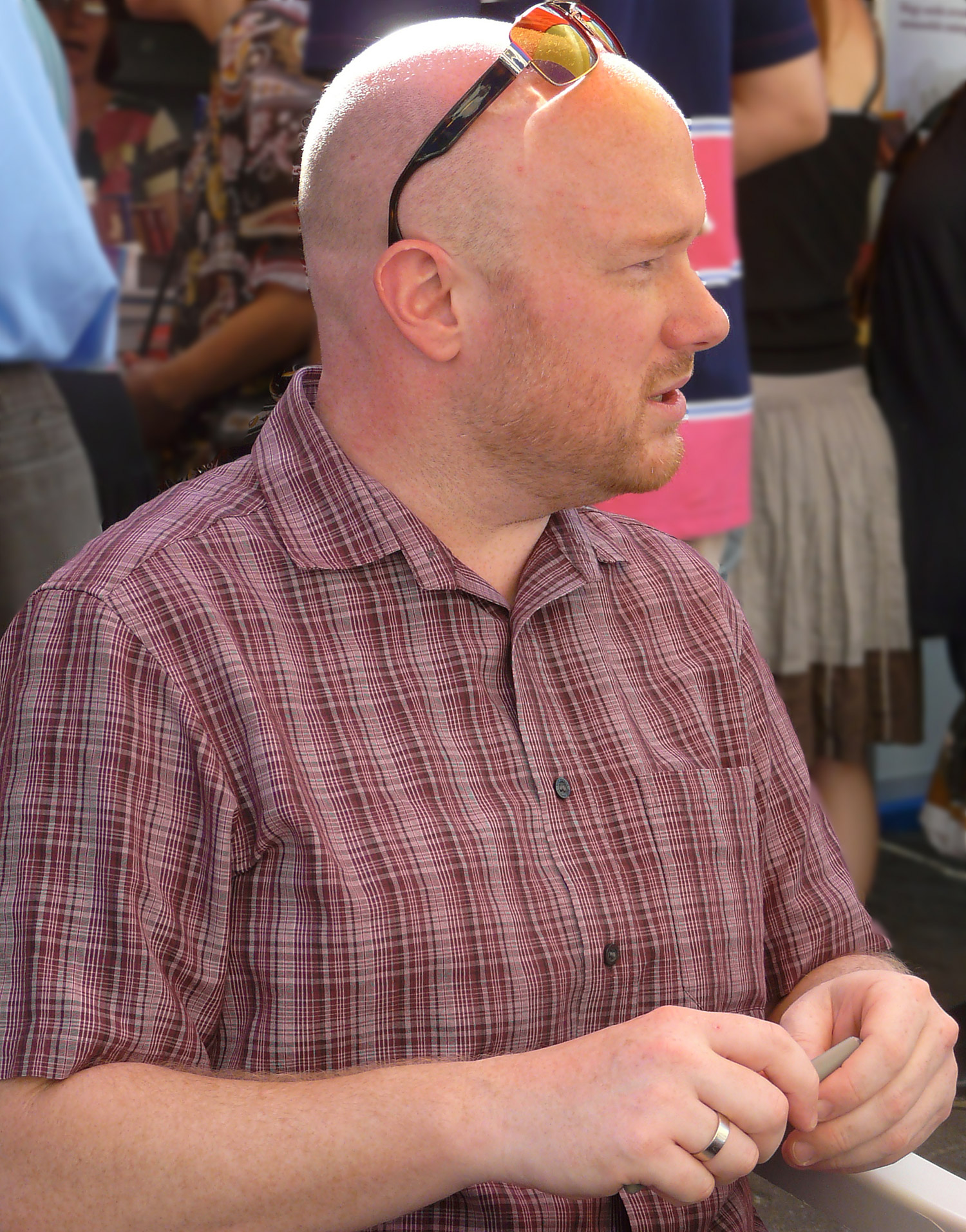
Olen Steinhauer,
author of spy fiction including The Tourist
(M.F.A.)

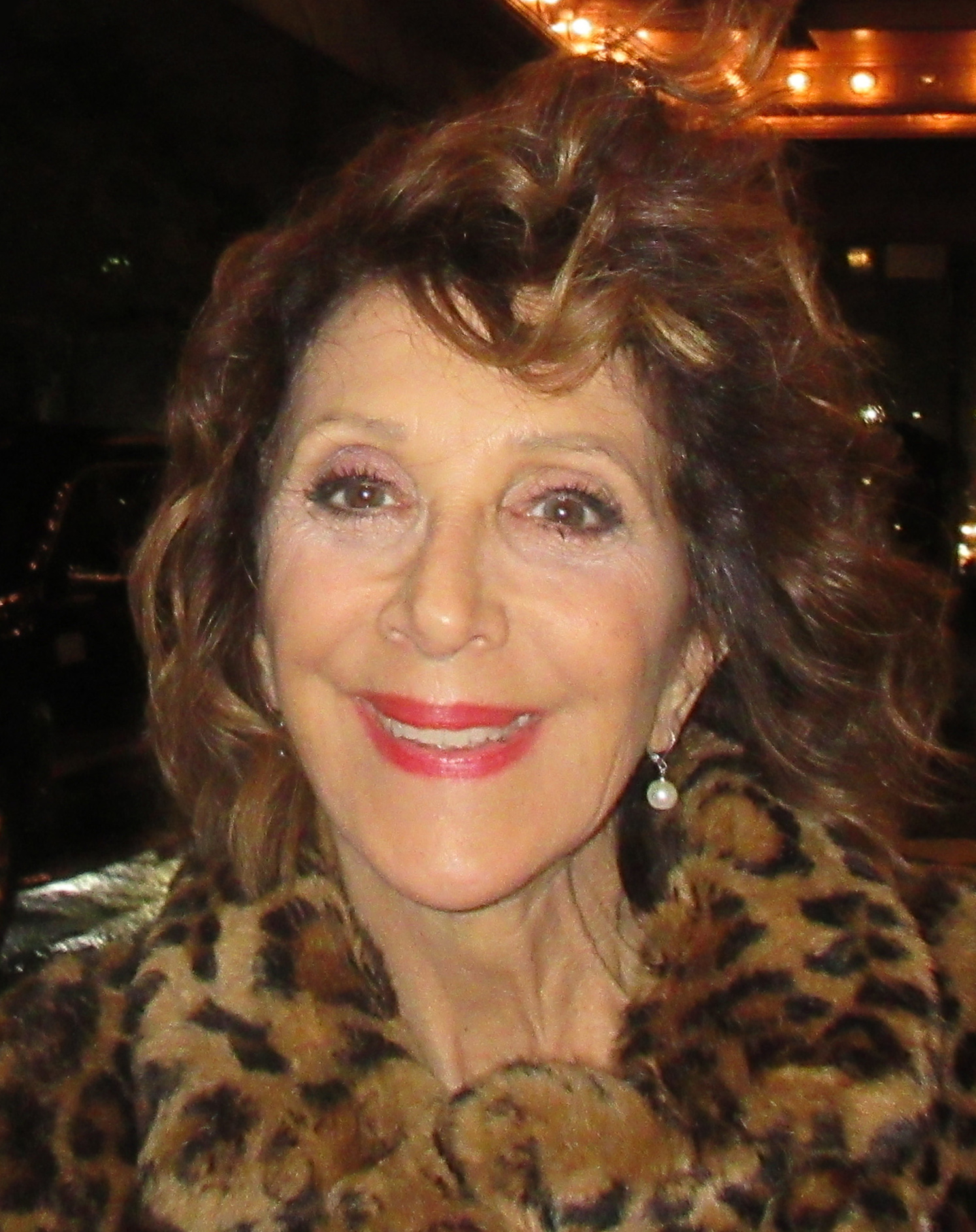
Andrea Martin,
actress known for Pippin, SCTV, and My Big Fat Greek Wedding
(B.A.)

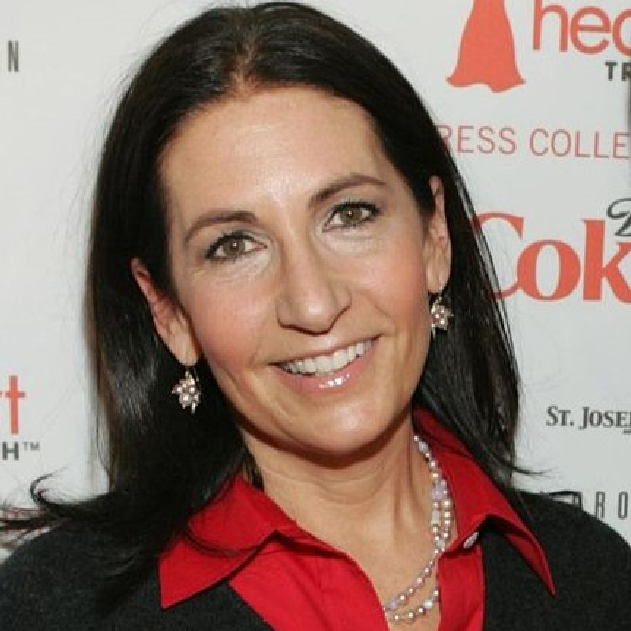
Bobbi Brown,
author and entrepreneur

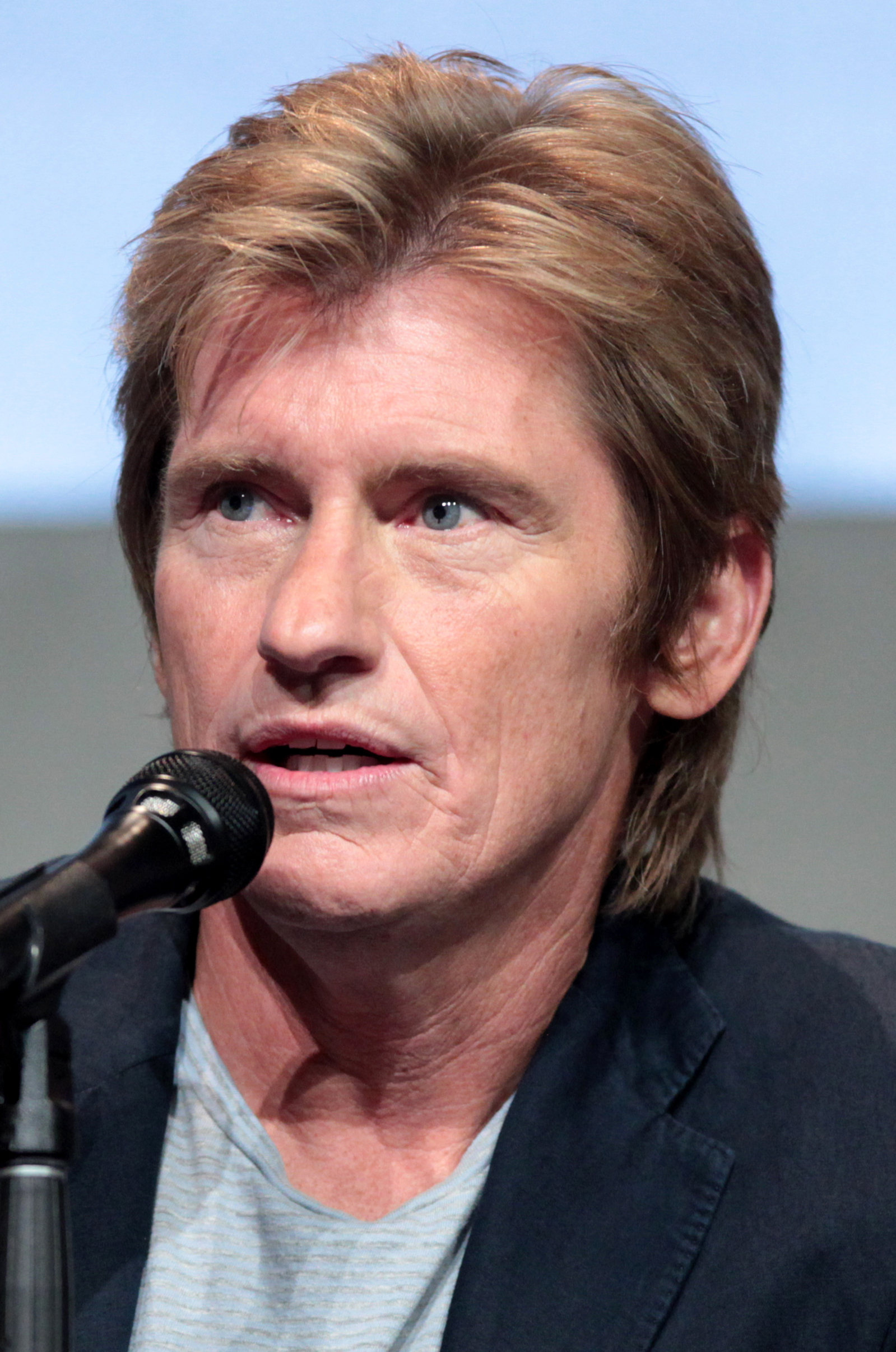
Denis Leary,
actor and co-creator of Rescue Me
(B.A.)

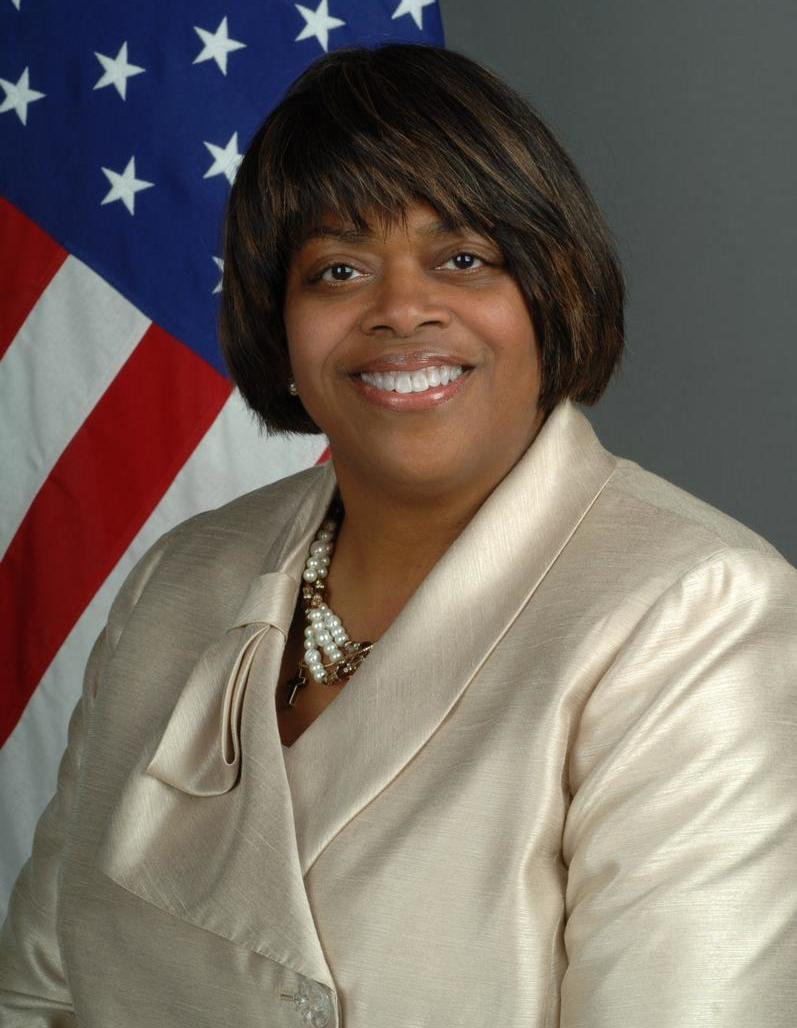
Suzan Johnson Cook,
advisor to President Bill Clinton
(B.A.)

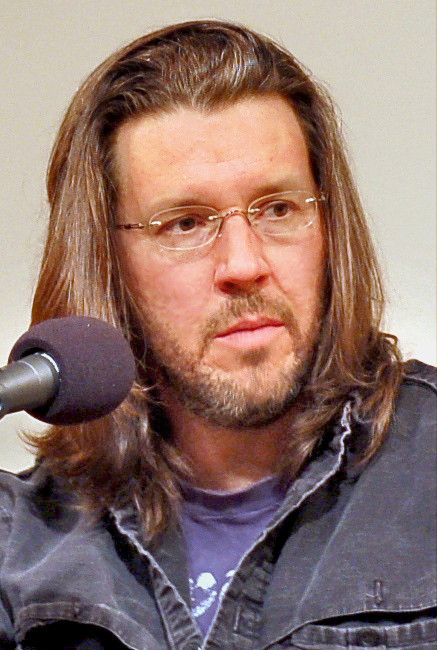
David Foster Wallace,
author of Infinite Jest
(faculty)

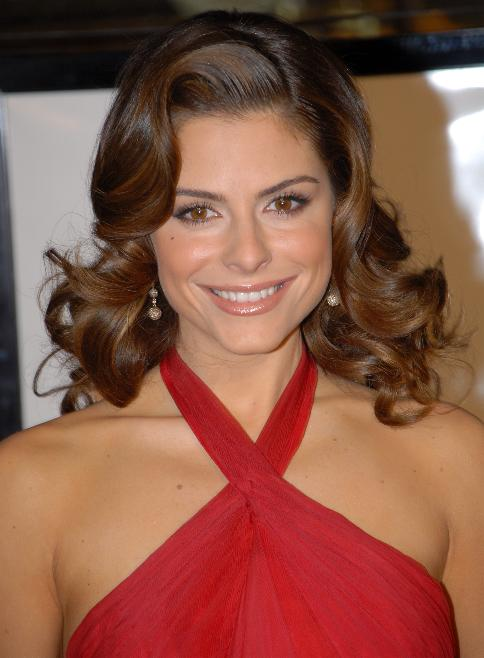
Maria Menounos,
journalist and media personality
