= M. Lee Pelton =

Not-for-profit & academic administrator

Lee Pelton
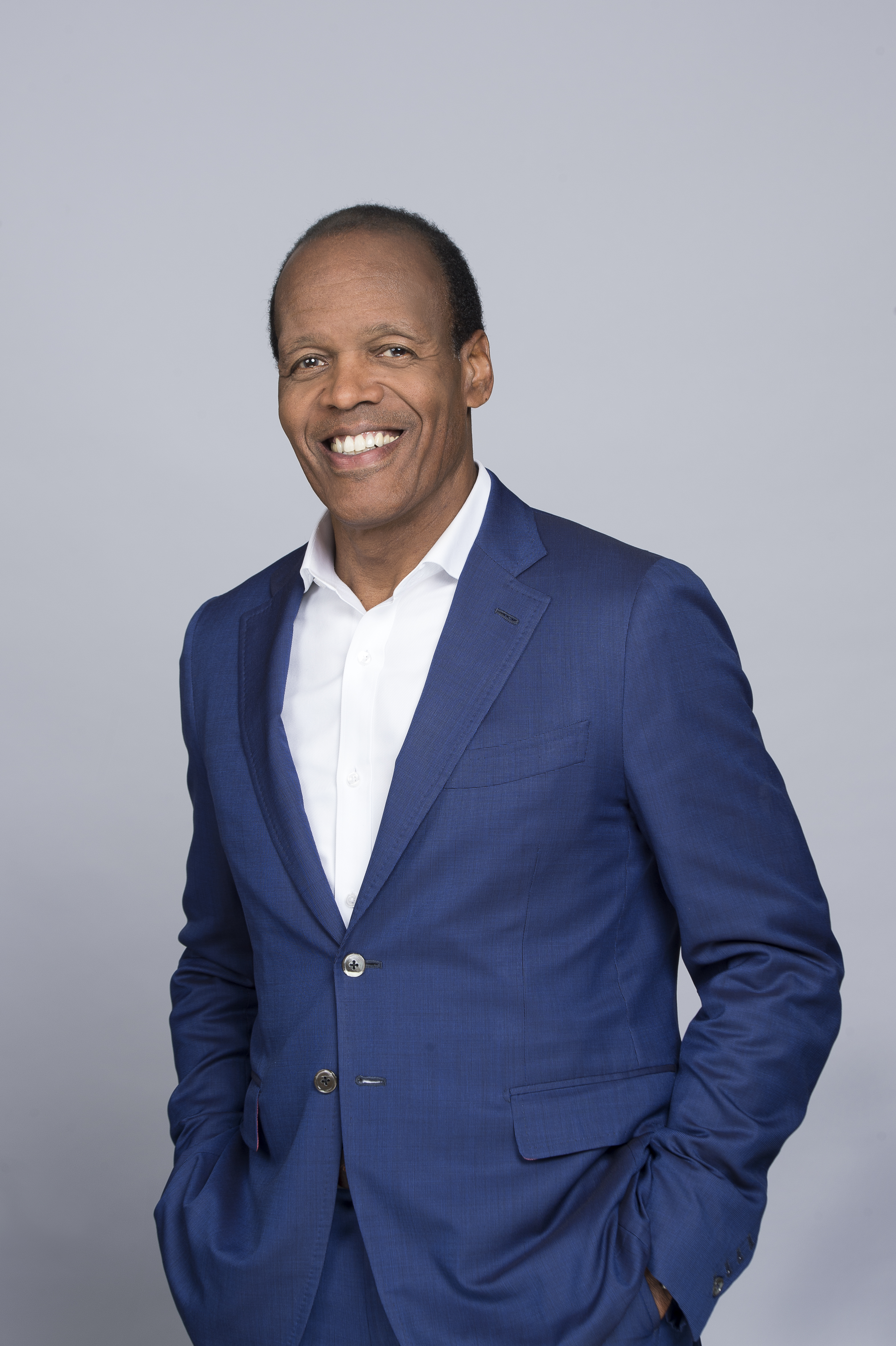
- Born: September 27, 1950 (age 75)
- Education: Wichita State University (BA); Harvard University (MA, PhD)

M. Lee Pelton (born September 27, 1950) is the president and CEO of the Boston Foundation, the community foundation serving the Greater Boston area since 1915. A native of Wichita, Kansas, Pelton studied English literature at Wichita State University and Harvard University. He then held various deanship positions at Colgate University and Dartmouth College before becoming president of Willamette University (1998-2011) and Emerson College (2011-2021). On June 1, 2021, Pelton took the helm at the Boston Foundation.

== Early life ==
M. Lee Pelton was born on September 27, 1950, to Clarence and Rosa Lee Pelton. He has three sisters and was raised in Wichita, Kansas, where he completed his secondary education at Wichita North High School. His father initially worked as a laborer and later became a manager within the Wichita Police Department, while his mother was a homemaker. Pelton graduated in 1974 from Wichita State University with a degree in English and psychology, earning magna cum laude honors with a concentration in 19th-century British literature. He subsequently completed a Ph.D. in English and American literature at Harvard University in 1984.

== Career ==
From 1974 to 1983, while working on his doctorate at Harvard, Pelton served as an instructor and teaching fellow in the English Department. After receiving his PhD in 1983, he became senior tutor of Winthrop House, one of Harvard's undergraduate colleges. He left Harvard in 1986, to become dean of students at Colgate University in Hamilton, N.Y. He served in that capacity until being named dean of the college in 1988. Pelton left Colgate in 1991, when he was named dean of Dartmouth College in Hanover, New Hampshire. While at Dartmouth he was responsible for the largest administrative body of the school, and held an academic appointment in the Department of English.

In July 1998, Pelton was appointed as the 22nd president of Willamette University in Salem, Oregon, the first university in the western United States. He expanded the faculty with 26 new tenured-track professorships and increased minority enrollment to 24 percent, up from 11 percent when he started. The school built two new buildings, Ford Hall and Kaneko Commons, and purchased several others adjacent to the campus in downtown Salem, and raised $131 million in a fund-raising campaign. At the end of the 2010 academic year Pelton left to take the same position at Emerson College in Massachusetts, replaced at Willamette by Stephen E. Thorsett.

Under Pelton’s leadership since 2011, Emerson College adopted a strategic plan that outlines five guiding strategies for the institution: Academic Excellence, Civic Engagement, Internationalization and Global Engagement, Innovation, and Financial Strength.

During Pelton’s tenure at Emerson, the College enhanced its Emerson Los Angeles program when it established a new physical presence in Hollywood in 2014 by opening a building for learning and living on Sunset Boulevard in West Hollywood.

Emerson College played a leading role in the revival of Boston’s theatre district when it purchased and renovated two leading theatres; the Cutler Majestic Theatre and Paramount Center theatres. The purchase and recent renovation of the historic Emerson Colonial Theatre, which hosted the first performances of Porgy and Bess (1935) and Oklahoma! (1943), among other major productions, cemented Emerson’s role in the revival of that section of the city. The theatre is now managed in partnership with Ambassador Theatre Group (ATG).

In 2018, the College established its Global Portals program on several continents, opening doors for students from around the world to gain an Emerson College degree.

An alliance with Marlboro College in Marlboro, VT, a private liberal arts college founded in 1946, was announced in November 2019, with the intention of keeping the legacy of the small liberal arts alive on Emerson’s Boston campus.

Finalized in July 2020, the alliance moved Marlboro’s academic program, known for its self-directed nature, to Emerson and renamed Emerson’s liberal arts and interdisciplinary studies program to the Marlboro Institute for Liberal Arts and Interdisciplinary Studies. Existing Marlboro students were invited to matriculate and tenured and tenure-track faculty had the option to teach at Emerson.

Emerson College has acquired or redeveloped several buildings to expand the institution’s footprint as outlined in Pelton's vision.

- In 2019, it reopened the 1,035-bed, 14-story Little Building building, which features 11 floors of student residences; black box cabaret theaters, dance practice rooms in the basement-level; a modern student mail center and street accessible retail spaces on the first floor; and classrooms and conference center-style spaces on the second floor. During the building’s renovation, the College also initiated a digitally projected public art display – the Uncommon Project – on the face of the building.
- Opened a new 18,000 square foot, 550-seat dining hall
- Opened a new residence hall at 2 Boylston Place, featuring 18 stories and 375 beds
- Purchased 172 Tremont Street to house student life and services
- Began the expansion of the sidewalk along Boylston Street in front of the recently renovated Little Building and created new retail food eatery spaces on Little Building street level.
- Created a new student dining facility, the Lion’s Den
- Opened a new Visitor Center at 104 Boylston Street
- Created the Urban Arts: Media Art Gallery

On December 1, 2020, Dr. Pelton announced his resignation as president of Emerson College to students and staff via email.

On June 1, 2021, Pelton joined the Boston Foundation as president and CEO. On May 21, 2026, he shared his plan to step down from the role at the end of August.

During his five-year tenure, the total assets of the organization grew from $1.7 billion in June 2021 to $2.6 billion in March 2026.

== Other ==
Pelton holds or has held positions on several educational and cultural boards and committees including the American Council on Education, the Harvard University Board of Overseers, the Oregon Shakespeare Festival, the Oregon Symphony, Oregon Health & Science University Foundation, American Association for Higher Education, National Association of Independent Colleges and Universities, and National Collegiate Athletic Association. He also serves on the Board of Directors for the Greater Boston Chamber of Commerce, and on the Board of Trustees of public media pioneer GBH and the Barr Foundation, a philanthropic organization with more than $3 billion in assets. Pelton served on the board of directors of Portland General Electric, the local publicly traded electric utility. He was married to Marlys Miller from 1974 to 1981, Kristen Wilson from 1981 to 2005, and to Carol (Leslie) Pelton, manager of the Oregon Cultural Trust from 2006 to 2008. He has three children.

== Awards ==
- Living Legends Award (Boston, Massachusetts' Museum of African American History, December 2021)
- Robert Coard Distinguished Leadership Medal (Urban College of Boston, 2021)
- The 100 Most Influential People in Boston (Boston Magazine, 2021)
- Distinguished Bostonian 2020 (Boston Chamber of Commerce, June 2020)
- Racial Justice Grant in Honor of Lee Pelton, $100,000 grant to be distributed to selected nonprofits (EOS Foundation, 2020)
- The Governor's Award (Massachusetts Foundation for the Humanities, 2020)
- 50 Most Powerful Leaders in Boston (Boston Business Journal, October 2020 and October 2018)
- The 100 Most Influential People in Boston (Boston Magazine Power Issue, April 2018)
- The 21 Most Powerful People in Boston Business (Boston Magazine’s Power Issue, May 2017)
- Boston’s 100 Most Influential People of Color (Get Konnected!, 2016)
- The Rosoff Award 20/20 (The Ad Club, April 2016)
- The Diversity Leadership Award (The National Diversity Council, October 2015)
- The Sabra Award (Israeli Stage, November 2014)
- Boston 50 on Fire, recognizing 50 leading innovators in Boston (BostInno, November 2014)
- Speak the Truth Award (Student Immigrant Movement, December 2014)
- The Power of Ideas: 75 Bold Thinkers Who Are Shaping Our City and the World (Boston Magazine Power Issue, May 2014)
- Champion of Freedom Award (Freedom House, March 2012)

Academic offices
Preceded by Jerry E. Hudson; Bryan Johnston (interim)	President of Willamette University; 1998–2011	Succeeded by Stephen Thorsett
Preceded by Jacqueline Liebergott	President of Emerson College; 2011–2021	Succeeded by Jay M. Bernhardt
