= Kick In =

Kick In may refer to:

- Kick-in, a procedure in Australian rules football to restart the game after a behind has been scored
- Kick In (1917 film), a lost 1917 silent film crime melodrama
- Kick In (1922 film), a 1922 American silent crime drama film
- Kick In (1931 film), a 1931 American Pre-Code drama film
