= His Picture =

1916 short film by William Garwood

- Directed by: William Garwood
- Written by: William Addison Lathrop (Scenario)
- Starring: William Garwood; Violet Mersereau; Clara Beyers
- Distributed by: Universal Film Manufacturing Company
- Release date: June 20, 1916
- Running time: 1:20
- Country: United States
- Languages: Silent film English intertitles

His Picture is a 1916 American silent short comedy directed and starring William Garwood, Violet Mersereau and Clara Beyers. The inspiration that was His Picture came from the ideals of self portraits.
