= The Honor of Mary Blake =

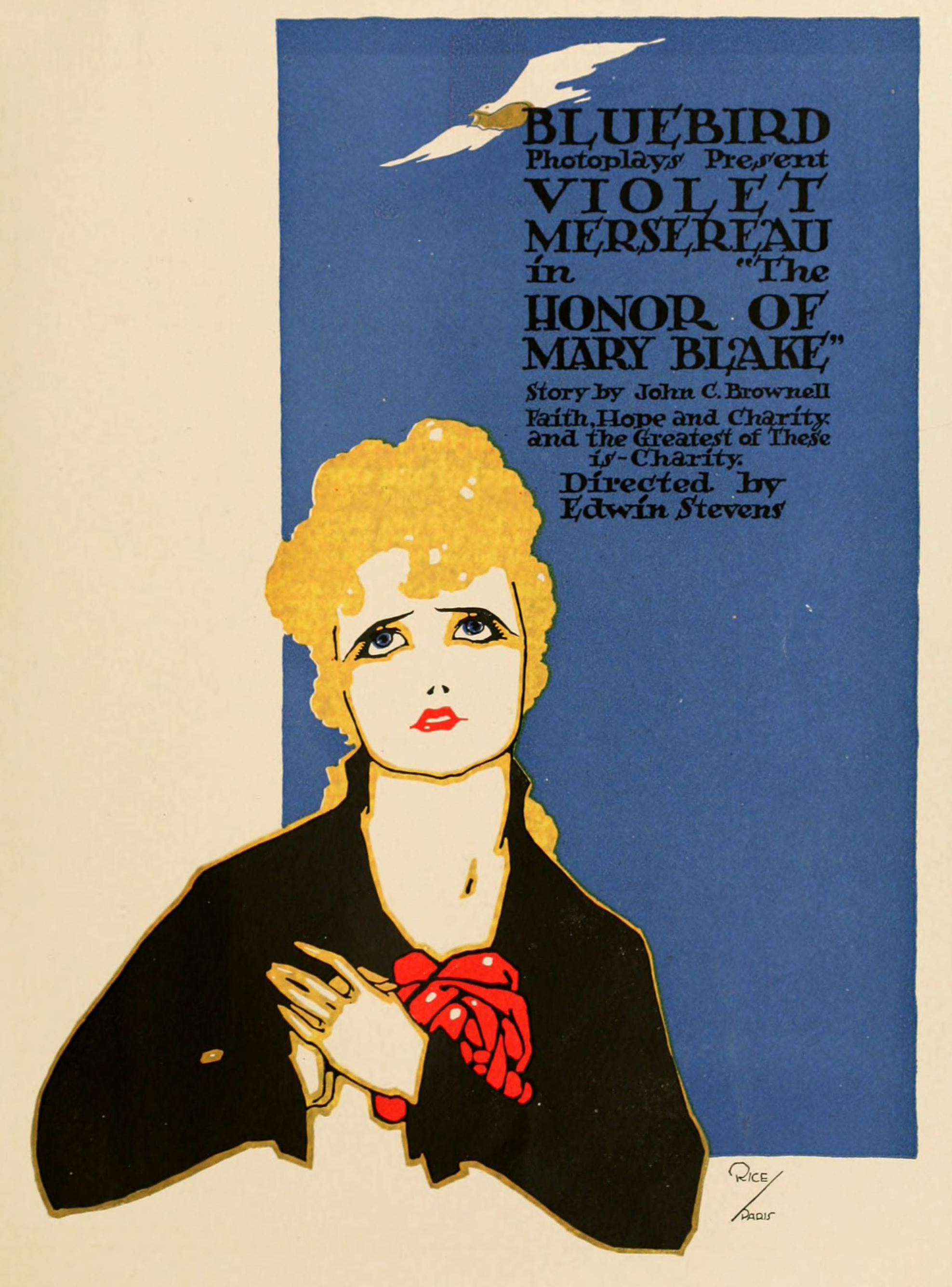
- Film poster
- Directed by: Edwin Stevens
- Written by: John C. Brownell
- Starring: Violet Mersereau; Tina Marshall; Caroline Harris; Sidney Mason
- Cinematography: Louis Ostland
- Production company: Bluebird Photoplays
- Distributed by: Universal Film Manufacturing Company
- Release date: December 18, 1916
- Running time: 5 reels
- Country: United States
- Language: Silent (English intertitles)

The Honor of Mary Blake is a 1916 drama film directed by Edwin Stevens. It was produced by Bluebird Photoplays, a subsidiary of Universal Pictures. No copies of the film are known to survive, making it a lost film.

== Plot ==
Mary Blake and Flossie Payton are actresses who chum together and live in the same rooming house in New York. Richard Kearney, wealthy theatrical manager, offers Mary an important part in a new play, and when the girl goes to his office to discuss matters, Kearney makes love to her. She repulses his advances, and goes home to relate her experience to Flossie.

The next morning there comes to Mary a note from Kearney offering marriage as atonement for his previous conduct, and Flossie urges Mary to "take a chance." This Mary decides to do, and, going to Kearney's office, accepts his proposal. Shortly after Kearney and Mary leave the office to be married a woman enters and asks for her husband, Mr. Kearney.

The office boy tells her that Mr. Kearney has just left to be married. From the boy she gets his home address and when Kearney and Mary return from the church where they were wed, the woman is waiting for them. Confronting the pair, she makes Kearney admit that his marriage to Mary Is Illegal, because he was married in Australia to the woman who has now appeared after an absence of many years.

Mary, broken-hearted, returns to Flossie and her furnished room, tells her sad story and, comforted by Flossie, decides to go with her chum on tour with a traveling repertoire company. The little town of Hillsdale is the first engagement to be played by the Manhattan Co., and there the show remains a week. One day Mary takes a stroll In the fields and woods near town and is attacked by a tramp who overtakes her in a lonely spot.

The girl's screams are heard by Kirk Hardy, a wealthy young farmer, who rescues her. The acquaintance thus begun is continued. Hardy's mother is a flllnty-souled member of the church and the deacons quickly spread the horrible news of her son's social downfall.

When the Manhattan Repertoire Co. ends Its engagement at Hillsdale and must leave for the next town, Mary Is suddenly stricken with pneumonia and Is left behind. Kirk hears of the girl's illness and supplies her with medical attention and nurses, frequently going himself to sit by her bedside. Their love progresses and wherf the girl recovers they are married.

Richard Kearney had, meanwhile divorced his wife, and learns through Flossie, with the Manhattan Co., that Mary Is living at Hillsdale, happily married. Kearney, bent upon possessing the girl, at all cost, goes to Hillsdale, secures an interview, and while Kirk Hardy's mother listens at the door pleads with Mary to go away with him. When she again repulses him, Kearney uses his strength to overpower her and forcibly kisses her just at the moment Mrs. Hardy stealthily opens the door and looks into the room.

The mother tells her son ; Kirk accuses Mary and she makes no attempt to deny the incident, explaining that she was helpless and that she had nothing to do with Kearney visiting her. Kirk goes to the hotel, meets Kearney and when the showman asks Kirk to take a drink, Hardy seemingly accepts the courtesy, but promptly dashes the poured-out whiskey into Kearney's face. In the fight that follows, a revolver is discharged and Kearney is dangerously wounded.

With her husband under arrest, Mary goes to the hotel and nurses Kearney so capably ttlat she saves his life. Hardy is released, explanations are forthcoming and the happy ending is attained when Kirk and Mary are reunited and Mrs. Hardy contributes her blessing.

== Cast ==
- Violet Mersereau as Mary Blake
- Tina Marshall as Flossie Payton
- Caroline Harris as Mrs. Hardy
- Sidney Mason as Kirk Hardy
- James O'Neill as Richard Kearney
- Yolande Duquette as Mrs. Kearney
- John C. Brownell as Rev. George Bliss

== Reception ==
A contemporary review in the Watonga Republican praised Mersereau's performance, calling the film "better suited to her fresh and youthful personality than any role she has ever appeared in upon the screen".

== Preservation status ==
According to the National Film Preservation Board, the film is lost.
