= Larry O'Neill =

- Directed by: Clem Easton
- Written by: William Addison Lathrop
- Starring: William Garwood; Violet Mersereau; Hal De Forrest
- Distributed by: Universal Film Manufacturing Company
- Release date: June 24, 1915
- Country: United States
- Languages: Silent film English intertitles

Larry O'Neill is a 1915 short silent American drama film directed by Clem Easton and starring William Garwood and Violet Mersereau. Also starring Portuguese actor Hal De Forrest.
