= The Girl by the Roadside =

- Directed by: Theodore Marston
- Written by: Frederic Van Rensselaer Dey (novel); John C. Brownell
- Starring: Violet Mersereau; Cecil Owen; Ann Andrews
- Production company: Universal Pictures
- Distributed by: Universal Pictures
- Release date: December 16, 1917
- Running time: 50 minutes
- Country: United States
- Languages: Silent; English intertitles

The Girl by the Roadside is a 1917 American silent mystery film directed by Theodore Marston and starring Violet Mersereau, Cecil Owen and Ann Andrews.

== Cast ==
- Violet Mersereau as Judith Ralston
- Cecil Owen as Bud Ralston
- Ann Andrews as Vera Ralston
- Alan Edwards as Boone Pendleton
- Robert F. Hill as Rayban
- Royal Byron as Billy Cartwright
- Kenneth Hall as Constable
- Sam B. Minter as Jake

== Bibliography ==
- Robert B. Connelly. The Silents: Silent Feature Films, 1910-36, Volume 40, Issue 2. December Press, 1998.
