= Dangerous Business =

Dangerous Business may refer to:

- Dangerous Business (1946 film), an American comedy drama film
- Dangerous Business (1920 film), an American silent comedy film
- "Dangerous Business" (Star Wars Resistance)
