= Billy's Love Making =

- Directed by: William Garwood
- Written by: William Addison Lathrop
- Starring: Violet Mersereau; William Garwood
- Distributed by: Universal Film Manufacturing Company
- Release date: August 2, 1915
- Running time: 1 reel (approximately ten minutes)
- Country: United States
- Languages: Silent film English intertitles

Billy's Love Making is a 1915 American silent romantic drama directed by and starring William Garwood and Violet Mersereau.
