= Everything for Sale =

Everything for Sale may refer to:

- Everything for Sale (1921 film), American silent film
- Everything for Sale (1969 film), Polish film
