= The Doll Doctor =

- Directed by: Jack Harvey
- Starring: Harry Benham, Violet Mersereau, and Jack Lewis
- Release date: 1916
- Country: USA
- Language: Silent

The Doll Doctor is a 1916 American short silent drama film, directed by Jack Harvey. It stars Harry Benham, Violet Mersereau, and Jack Lewis.

== Plot ==
While driving through the slums, Harry Belden accidentally runs over a doll dropped by a child. He takes the child to an old doll doctor to have it repaired. There he meets Violet Talmadge, who is buying many dolls to give to poor children on Christmas Eve. Belden helps her carry them home and asks if he can return the next night to help deliver them.

The following evening, Belden arrives with a horse sleigh, his arms full of toys. Together they deliver the gifts. In one small room, two children sadly believe Santa Claus will not visit them. When they hear the sleigh bells outside, they rush into bed, thinking Santa has arrived. Belden and Violet leave their presents and continue on their way. After finishing their deliveries, they return home.

Years later, Belden visits the doll shop again to buy a large doll for his daughter’s birthday. He places the doll in his sleeping child’s arms. Over time, he becomes jealous of the attention his wife receives from a young doctor. His resentment grows, and one night he accuses her of being unfaithful when she returns home late after caring for a sick child in the slums. Belden orders her to leave. Violet takes their child and disappears from his life.

As time passes, Belden is tormented by thoughts of his wife and daughter living in poverty. Driven by despair, he wanders the streets without direction. He eventually finds himself standing before the old doll doctor’s shop and goes inside.

Inside the shop, Belden looks at the toys until he notices a familiar doll with its head removed. The doll doctor begins repairing it and explains that its owners will return shortly. Belden hides among the toys and waits. Soon Violet and their daughter enter the shop. The child receives her doll and wanders toward where Belden is hiding.

When Violet searches for her daughter, she finds her in Belden’s arms. She tries to take the child away, but the child clings tightly to her father. Belden begs Violet for forgiveness and asks her to return, right or wrong. He wraps his arms around his wife, his child, and the doll, and the family is reunited.

== Characters ==
Harry Benham as Harry Belden.

Violet Mersereau as Violet Talmadge.

Jack Lewis as The Doll Doctor.

Melissa Fahrbach as Violet.
