= Violet Mersereau =

American actress

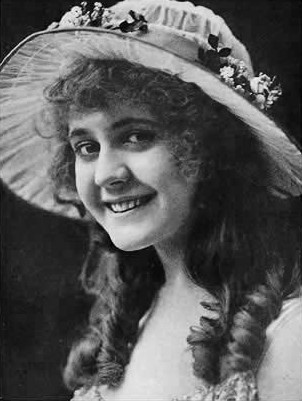
- Mersereau in 1916
- Born: October 2, 1892; New York City, U.S.
- Died: November 12, 1975 (aged 83); Plymouth, Massachusetts, U.S.
- Occupation: Actress
- Years active: 1900–1926

Violet Mersereau (October 2, 1892 – November 12, 1975) was an American stage and film actress. Over the course of her screen career, Mersereau appeared in over 100 short and silent film features.

== Early life ==
Mersereau was born in New York City and had a younger sister, Claire (1894–1982). Her father died when she was 9 years old. Her maternal grandmother, Mme. Luzanzie, had been a noted stage actress in France. While Mersereau's own mother had acting aspirations, she never pursued a career in acting but decided to allow her children to begin acting.

== Career ==
At the age of 8, she played juvenile parts in repertory theatre. She toured with Margaret Anglin and portrayed the role of "Flora" in the original company of The Clansman. The play continued to show for three years. During her time as a stage actress she was given the nickname "The Child Wonder." She also starred on the touring production of Rebecca of Sunnybrook Farm and then became a screen actress.

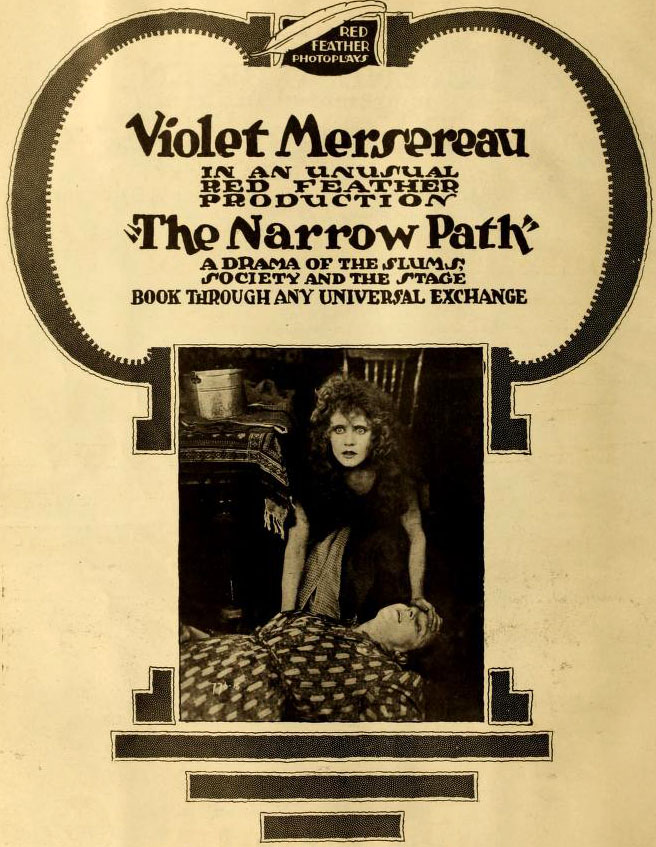
The Narrow Path (1916)

In 1908, Mersereau made her first film for the Biograph Company. She stayed with the company until 1911. She then signed with Independent Moving Pictures where she appeared in ingenue roles. She found success with these roles and was often cast as innocent young helpless girls. When Independent Moving Pictures and several other studios merged to form Universal Pictures she continued working for Universal. During this time, she appeared in several short films alongside William Garwood (who often directed the films).

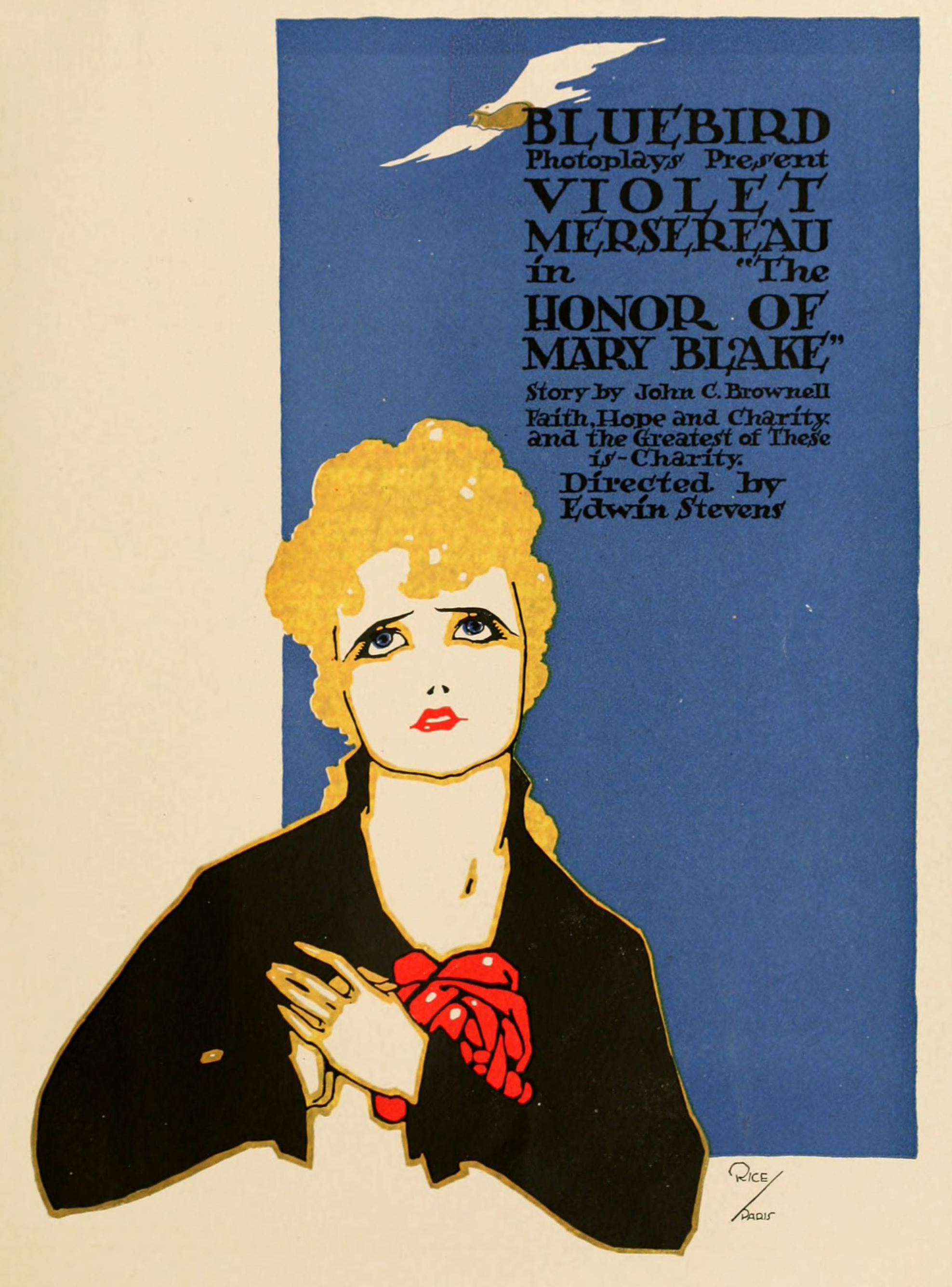
The Honor of Mary Blake, 1916

In 1916, Carl Laemmle decided to open one of his eastern United States studios for Mersereau's own productions. Laemmle engaged Oscar A. C. Lund to direct her in these features. Mersereau had always exhibited a distinct preference for working in the East, and disliked California. Among her most successful ventures for Blue Bird and Universal include The Boy Girl (1917), Morgan's Raiders (1918), Little Miss Nobody (1917), Susan's Gentleman (1917), The Honor of Mary Blake (1916), Souls United (1917), Autumn (1916), and The Little Terror (1917).

The most acclaimed project of her final years in film was Nero (1922), directed by J. Gordon Edwards, grandfather of Blake Edwards. She continued in motion pictures into the 1920s, with her final film being The Wives of the Prophet (1926), in which she had the role of Alma.

== Personal life ==
Mersereau died on November 12, 1975, in Plymouth, Massachusetts, at the age of 83.

== Selected filmography ==
- The Feud and the Turkey (1908)
- The Test of Friendship (1908)
- The Cricket on the Hearth (1909)
- The Lonely Villa (1909)
- His Lost Love (1909)
- His Trust (1911)
- His Trust Fulfilled (1911)
- The Spitfire (1914)
- On Dangerous Ground (1915)
- The Stake (1915)
- The Supreme Impulse (1915)
- Wild Blood (1915)
- The Adventure of the Yellow Curl Papers (1915)
- Uncle's New Blazer (1915)
- Destiny's Trump Card (1915)
- You Can't Always Tell (1915)
- Larry O'Neill (1915)
- Thou Shalt Not Lie (1915)
- Driven by Fate (1915)
- Billy's Love Making (1915)
- The Wolf of Debt (1915)
- The Unnecessary Sex (1915)
- Getting His Goat (1915)
- The Great Problem (1916)
- The Doll Doctor (1916)
- His Picture (1916)
- The Honor of Mary Blake (1916)
- Broken Fetters (1916)
- The Gentle Art of Burglary (1916)
- Susan's Gentleman (1917)
- The Raggedy Queen (1917)
- The Little Terror (1917)
- The Girl by the Roadside (1917)
- The Boy Girl (1917)
- Little Miss Nobody (1917)
- The Midnight Flyer (1918)
- Proxy Husband (1919)
- Finders Keepers (1921)
- Out of the Depths (1921)
- Nero (1922)
- The Shepherd King (1923)
- Her Own Free Will (1924)
- Lend Me Your Husband (1924)
- The Wives of the Prophet (1926)

== Additional sources ==
- Iowa City, Iowa Citizen, Violet Mersereau, Tuesday, October 1, 1918. Page 5.
- Lincoln, Nebraska Sunday Star, Answers To Movie Fans, March 18, 1917, Page 3.
- Lincoln Sunday Star, Answers To Movie Fans, March 25, 1923, Page 15.
- Biography and Filmography of Violet Mersereau at KinoTV.com
