= Thou Shalt Not Lie =

- Directed by: Clem Easton
- Written by: Dwight Cleveland (Story)
- Starring: William Garwood; Violet Mersereau; Charles Ogle; William Welsh
- Distributed by: Universal Film Manufacturing Company
- Release date: July 22, 1915
- Running time: 2 reels (approx. 20 minutes)
- Country: United States
- Languages: Silent film English intertitles

Thou Shalt Not Lie is a 1915 American silent film directed by Clem Easton and starring William Garwood and Violet Mersereau. The film also starred Charles Ogle, and William Welsh.
