= The Homebreaker =

1919 film by Victor Schertzinger

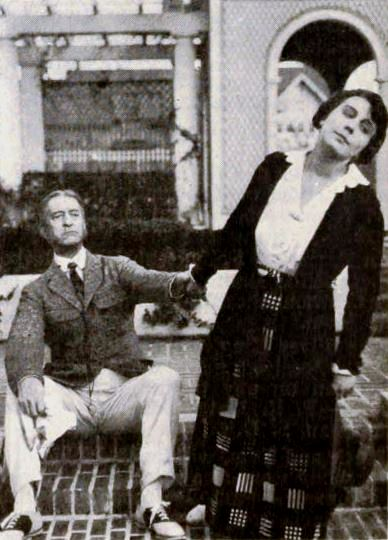
- Film still
- Directed by: Victor Schertzinger
- Screenplay by: John Lynch; R. Cecil Smith
- Produced by: Thomas H. Ince
- Starring: Dorothy Dalton; Douglas MacLean; Edwin Stevens; Frank Leigh; Beverly Travis; Nora Johnson
- Cinematography: John Stumar
- Edited by: W. Duncan Mansfield
- Production company: Thomas H. Ince Corporation
- Distributed by: Paramount Pictures
- Release date: April 20, 1919
- Running time: 50 minutes
- Country: United States
- Language: Silent (English intertitles)

The Homebreaker is a 1919 American silent comedy film directed by Victor Schertzinger and written by John Lynch and R. Cecil Smith. The film stars Dorothy Dalton, Douglas MacLean, Edwin Stevens, Frank Leigh, Beverly Travis, and Nora Johnson. The film was released on April 20, 1919, by Paramount Pictures. It is presumed to be a lost film.

== Plot ==
As described in a film magazine, Mary Marbury, a traveling saleswoman for Abbott and Son and incidentally the fiancée of Raymond Abbott, the son, returns from a trip to find that Raymond and his sister Lois are spending afternoons and evenings with Fernando Poyntier, a pseudo Russian nobleman, and his supposed sister Marcia. With the assistance of Jonas Abbott, father of Raymond and Lois, she decides to bring them to their senses. Consequently, she speeds up a bit with Jonas as her companion. At about the time she has worried Raymond that she will marry his father, Fernando and his supposed sister rob the house. The plot is further complicated by Fernando attempting to double-cross his confederate and elope with Lois. Mary stumbles onto the truth while on a yacht trip with the elder Abbott. The arrest of the crooks follows and Mary wins back Raymond.

== Cast ==
- Dorothy Dalton as Mary Marbury
- Douglas MacLean as Raymond Abbott
- Edwin Stevens as Jonas Abbott
- Frank Leigh as Fernando Poyntier
- Beverly Travis as Marcia Poyntier
- Nora Johnson as Lois Abbott
- Mollie McConnell as Mrs. White
- Rudolph Valentino as Dance extra (uncredited)

== Reception ==
Variety's review found the film to be entirely average, describing it as "There is nothing in this picture to go mad over. It is just a good program filler."
