= Bad Company (1925 film) =

1925 film

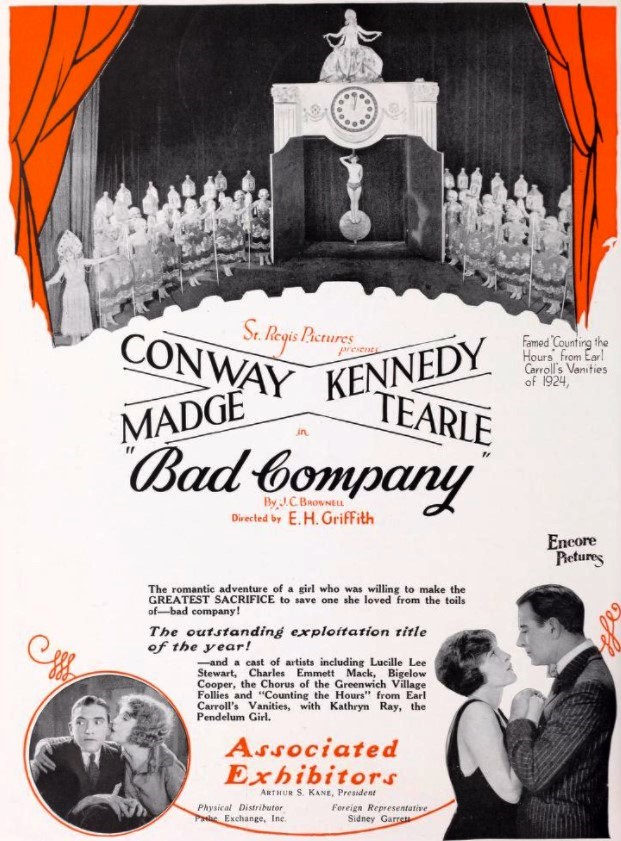
- Advertisement
- Directed by: Edward H. Griffith
- Written by: George V. Hobart; Arthur Hoerl
- Based on: "The Ultimate Good" by John C. Brownell
- Starring: Madge Kennedy; Conway Tearle; Bigelow Cooper
- Cinematography: Marcel Picard; Walter Arthur
- Production company: St. Regis Pictures
- Distributed by: Associated Exhibitors
- Release date: February 15, 1925
- Running time: 50 minutes
- Country: United States
- Language: Silent (English intertitles)

Bad Company is a 1925 American silent romantic drama film directed by Edward H. Griffith, based on a story by John C. Brownell. It stars Madge Kennedy, Conway Tearle, and Bigelow Cooper.

== Plot ==
As described in a review in a film magazine, James Hamilton and his friend Peter Ewing aid a poorly dressed young woman who faints from exhaustion. They are then surprised when she holds them up and robs the safe. At a reception, one of the guests is Gloria Waring, a musical comedy star, and James, struck by her resemblance to the woman who robbed them, finds part of the costume in her automobile and confronts her. She confesses that she adopted this method to obtain her father's will in a desperate effort to prevent the fortune that was left to her brother from falling into the hands of an adventuress named Teddy. James, who has fallen in love with Gloria, offers to help her, discovers that Teddy is the young woman with whom he once had an affair. Just as Teddy and the brother Dick are about to be married, James prevents it by claiming that Teddy is his common-law wife. Gloria will then have nothing to do with James, and he makes plans to leave for Europe. Peter discloses that the fortune was left to Gloria and that James sacrificed himself for her sake. Deciding to accept that James' affair with Teddy was just a youthful discretion, Gloria and James are reconciled.

== Cast ==
- Madge Kennedy as Gloria Waring
- Bigelow Cooper as Peter Ewing
- Conway Tearle as James Hamilton
- Lucille Lee Stewart as Teddy Lamont
- Charles Emmett Mack as Dick Reynolds

== Preservation ==
With no prints of Bad Company located in any film archives, it is a lost film.
