= The Hunted Woman =

1925 film

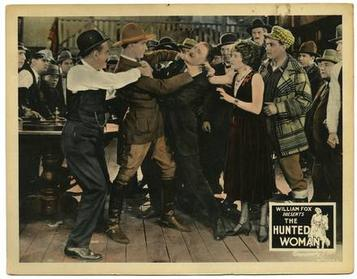
- Lobby card
- Directed by: Jack Conway
- Written by: Robert N. Lee; Dorothy Yost
- Based on: The Hunted Woman by James Oliver Curwood
- Produced by: William Fox
- Starring: Seena Owen; Earl Schenck; Victor McLaglen
- Cinematography: Joseph H. August
- Production company: Fox Film Corporation
- Distributed by: Fox Film Corporation
- Release date: March 22, 1925
- Running time: 5 reels
- Country: United States
- Language: Silent (English intertitles)

The Hunted Woman is a 1925 American silent drama film directed by Jack Conway and starring Seena Owen, Earl Schenck, and Victor McLaglen.

== Plot ==
As described in a film magazine review, a young woman goes North to find out whether her husband is dead or alive and also to effect the release of her innocent brother from jail. She meets a youth who has staked out a gold claim and has a romance with him. She does not surrender her love until her husband is found and killed, meeting death in a fight with the youth's partner.

== Cast ==
- Seena Owen as Joanne Gray
- Victor McLaglen as Quade
- Earl Schenck as John Aldous
- Diana Miller as Marie
- Cyril Chadwick as Culver Rann
- Francis McDonald as Joe De Bar
- Edward Peil Sr. as Charlie

== Preservation ==
With no prints of The Hunted Woman located in any film archives, it is a lost film.

== Bibliography ==
- Munden, Kenneth White. The American Film Institute Catalog of Motion Pictures Produced in the United States, Part 1. University of California Press, 1997.
