= Florida Kingsley =

American actress

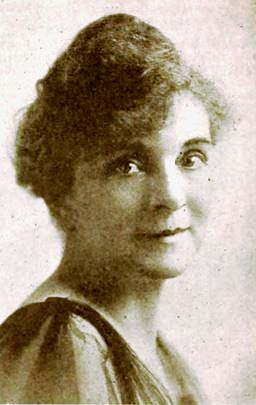
- Born: 1867; Jacksonville, Florida
- Died: March 19, 1937 (aged 69–70); Bay Shore Long Island, New York
- Occupation: Actress
- Spouse: Wright Huntingdon

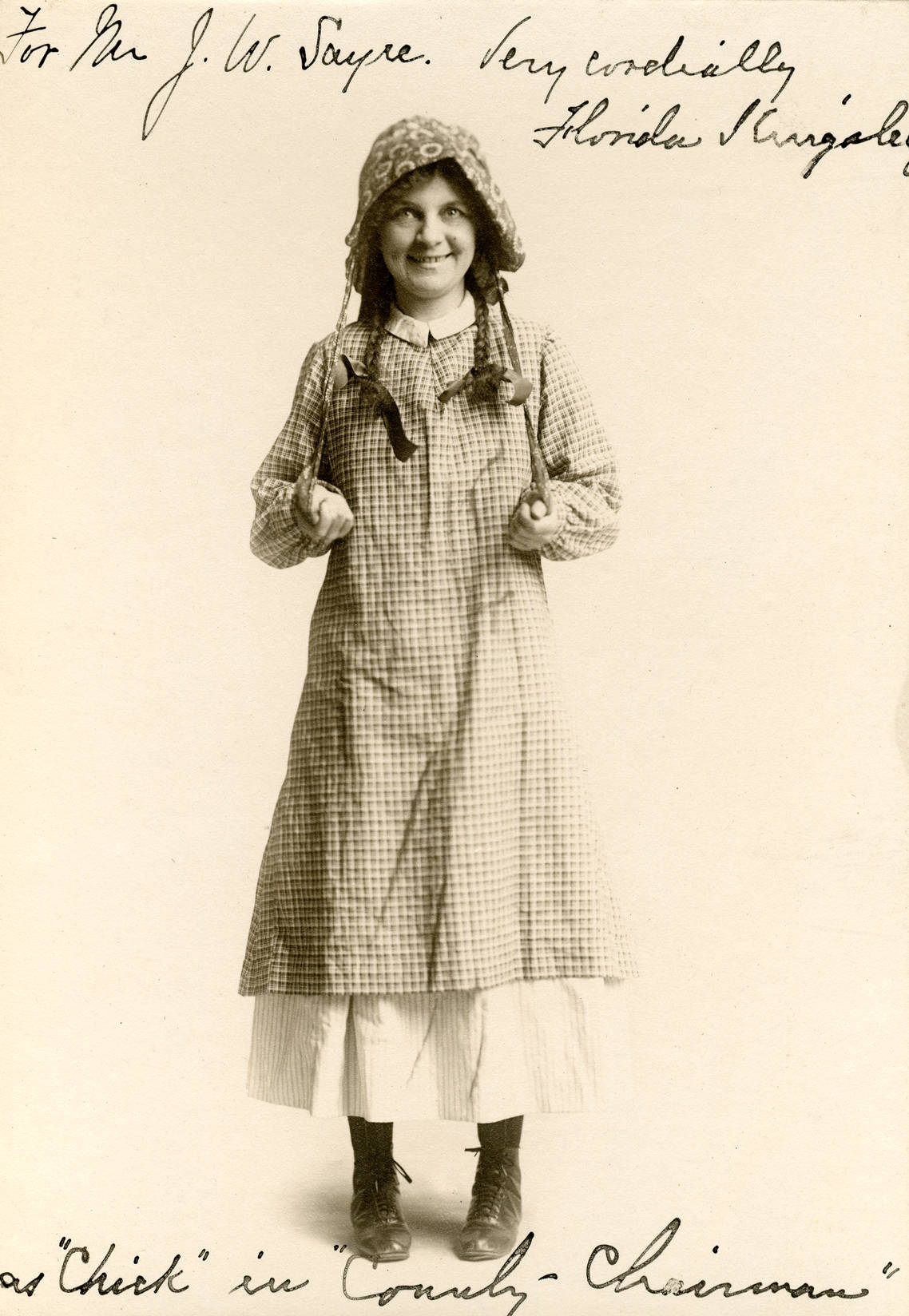

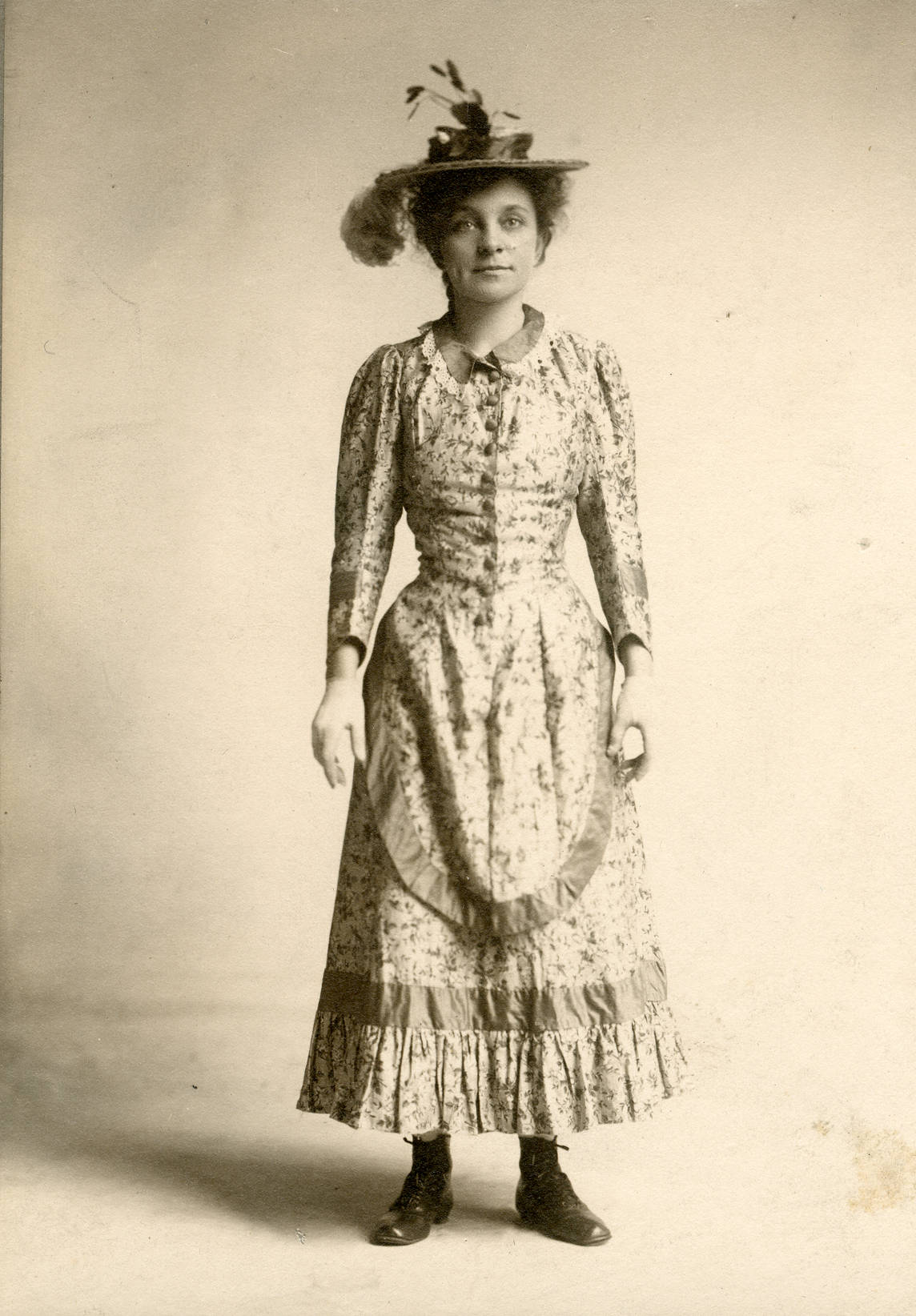

Florida Kingsley (1867–1937) was an Actor on stage and screen in the United States. Her career lasted more than 40 years. She is in numerous films from the silent film era.

== Theater ==
- The Capitol (1895)

== Selected filmography ==
- The Turmoil as Mrs. Vertrees
- The Boy Girl (1917) as Agatha Channing
- Hidden Fires as Mrs. Treadway Parke
- The Woman on the Index (1919) as Mrs. Martin
- Thou Shalt Not (1919) as Ruth's Mother
- The Woman Under Oath (1919) as Mrs. O'Neil
- Youthful Folly (1920) as Aunt Martha
- Dangerous Business as Mrs. Brooks
- Youthful Folly as Aunt Martha
- Greater Than Fame (1920) as Aunt Prudence (credited as Flora Kingsley)
- Annabell Lee (1921) as David's Mother, film based on Edgar Allan Poe's poem Annabel Lee. Extant.
- Is Life Worth Living? (1921) as Mrs. Grant
- Clay Dollars (1921) as Mrs. Gordon
- The Little Red Schoolhouse as Hired Girl
