= Caroline Harris (actress) =

American actress

- Born: November 11, 1867
- Died: April 23, 1937 (aged 69); New York City
- Occupation: film actress
- Years active: 1909–1917

Caroline E. Harris (November 11, 1867 – April 23, 1937) was an American actress. She appeared in 12 films between 1909 and 1917. Her last film was The Gulf Between, the first film released in the Technicolor process.

Harris was the mother of the American film actor Richard Barthelmess.

She died in New York, New York.

== Partial filmography ==
- To Save Her Soul (1909)
- Madame Butterfly (1915)
- Gold and the Woman (1916)
- The Honor of Mary Blake (1916)
- The Ragged Princess (1916)
- The Eternal Sapho (1916)
- The Gulf Between (1917)
- The Boy Girl (1917)
