= Madeleine Sharps Buchanan =

American novelist

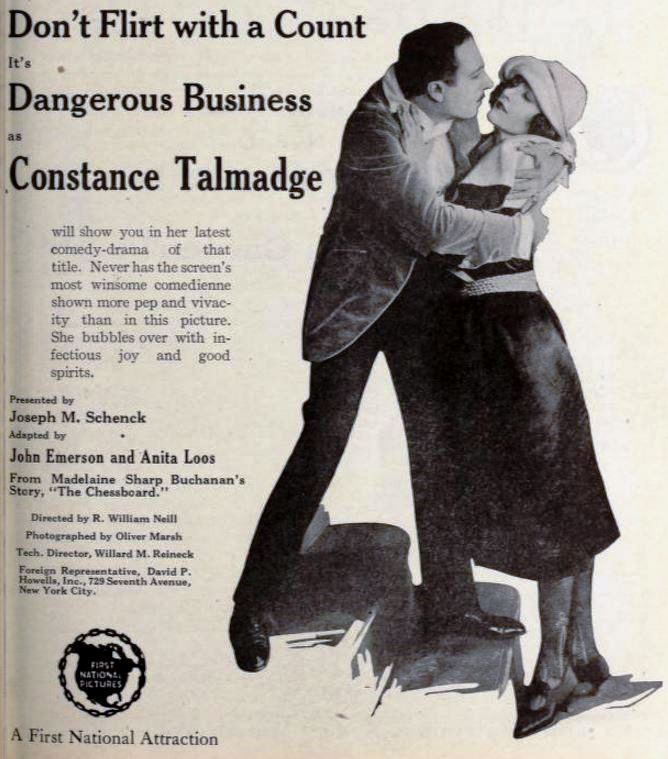
Ad for Dangerous Business

Madeleine Sharps Buchanan (née Twining Sharps) was a writer of short stories and detective novels in the United States. Her story "The Chessboard" was adapted into the 1920 film Dangerous Business starring Constance Talmadge.

She wrote for various magazines including The Continent (magazine), The Argosy, The Black Cat, and County Hand Book on National Distribution.

In 1915, her work was described as small town stories featuring a fictionalized version of where she grew up in Pennsylvania. She was also described as an author of charming characters and a master of detective story writing.

== Bibliography ==
- "The Chessboard" (1920)
- The Crimson Blade: a detective story (1926)
- Powdered Proof (1927)
- The Poison Eye, A Detective Story (1928)
- Haunted Bells (1929)
- The Black Pearl Murders (1930)
- The Subway Murder (1930)
- The Tempting Virtue (1933)
- The Tempting of Tavernake (1933)

== Filmography ==
- Dangerous Business (1920 film), adapted from 'The Chessboard"
