= Sidney Mason =

American actor (1886–1923)

- Publicity Photo of Sidney Mason
- Born: September 26, 1886; Paterson, New Jersey, United States
- Died: March 1, 1923 (aged 36); New York, New York, United States
- Occupation: Actor
- Years active: 1912–1922 (film)

Sidney Mason (1886–1923) was an American film actor active during the silent era. He was the father of the actor Sydney Mason.

== Selected filmography ==
- His Neighbor's Wife (1913)
- The Daughter of MacGregor (1916)
- The Honor of Mary Blake (1916)
- The Peddler (1917)
- Susan's Gentleman (1917)
- The Little Terror (1917)
- The Painted Madonna (1917)
- Little Miss Nobody (1917)
- The Boy Girl (1917)
- Bonnie Annie Laurie (1918)
- The Prussian Cur (1918)
- The Forbidden Path (1918)
- A Fallen Idol (1919)
- A Modern Salome (1920)
- The Good-Bad Wife (1920)

== Bibliography ==
- Langman, Larry. American Film Cycles: The Silent Era. Greenwood Publishing, 1998.
