= Bitter Sweets =

1928 film

- Directed by: Charles Hutchison
- Written by: John C. Brownell; Terrence Daugherty; Elaine Wilmont
- Starring: Barbara Bedford; Ralph Graves; Crauford Kent
- Cinematography: Leon Shamroy
- Edited by: Bernard B. Ray
- Production company: Peerless Pictures
- Distributed by: Peerless Pictures
- Release date: September 5, 1928
- Running time: 60 minutes
- Country: United States
- Languages: Silent; English intertitles

Bitter Sweets is a 1928 American silent crime film directed by Charles Hutchison and starring Barbara Bedford, Ralph Graves and Crauford Kent.

== Cast ==
- Barbara Bedford as Bett Kingston
- Ralph Graves as Ralph Horton
- Crauford Kent as Paul Gebhardt
- Joy McKnight as Diana Van Norton
- Ethan Laidlaw as Joe Gorman
- Frank Hall Crane as Nick Clayton
- Richard Belfield as District Attorney
- John Webb Dillion as Donovan
- Oscar Smith as Jeff Washington

== Bibliography ==
- Munden, Kenneth White. The American Film Institute Catalog of Motion Pictures Produced in the United States, Part 1. University of California Press, 1997.
