= Clara Beyers =

American actress

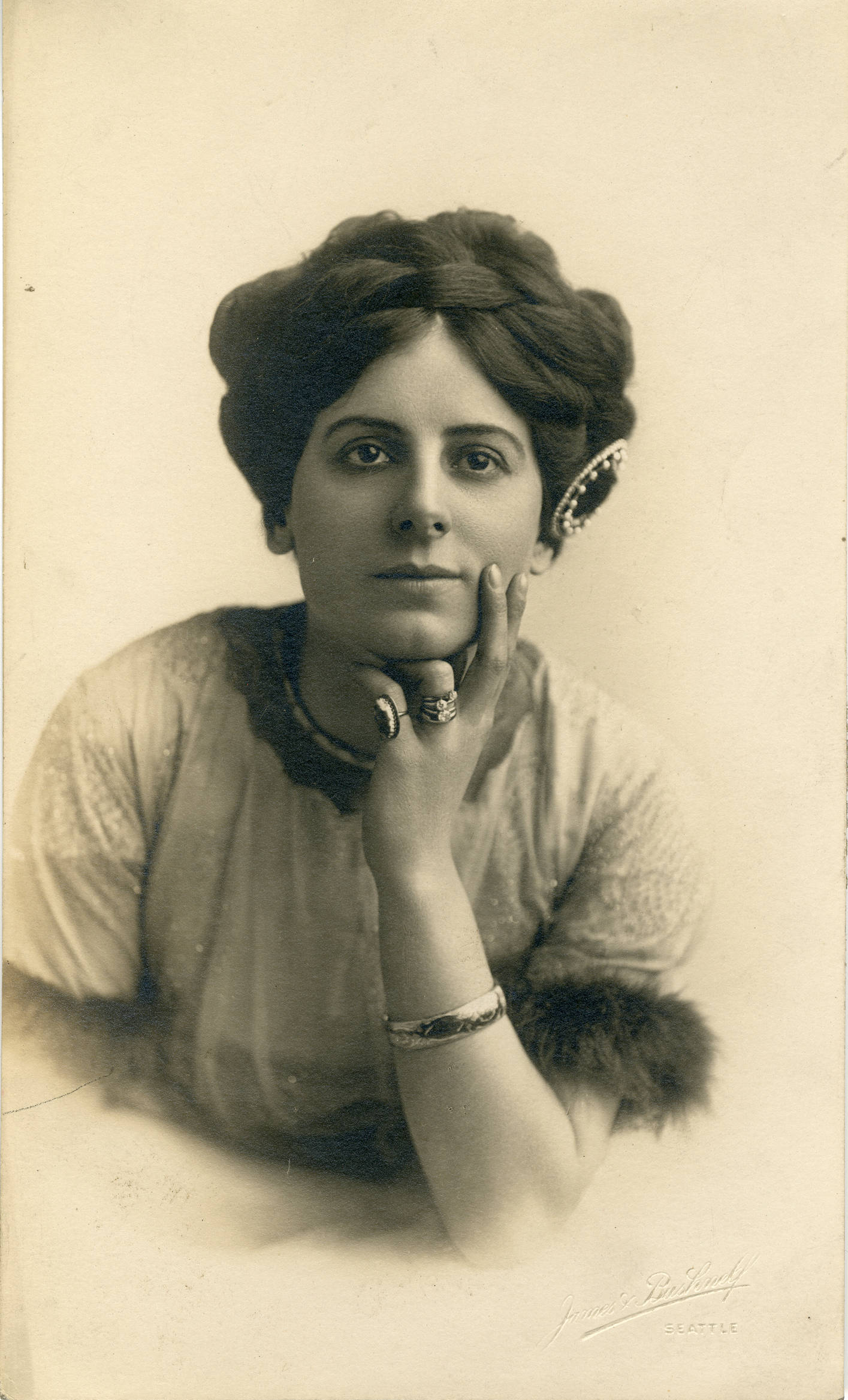
- Born: 1880
- Died: 1950 (aged 69-70)

Clara Beyers (c.1880 – c.1950?) was an American silent film stock actress. (Note: A stock actress was an actress who was employed by the studio on a contract much like present day employee contracts.)

Beyers acted on stage for nine years before she began making films. She acted with stock theater companies in Omaha, Philadelphia, San Francisco, and Vancouver. When she turned to film, she signed with the Balboa company.

She was signed in 1913 and starred in 32 films before her retirement from film in 1922. She starred with William Garwood in films such as His Picture.

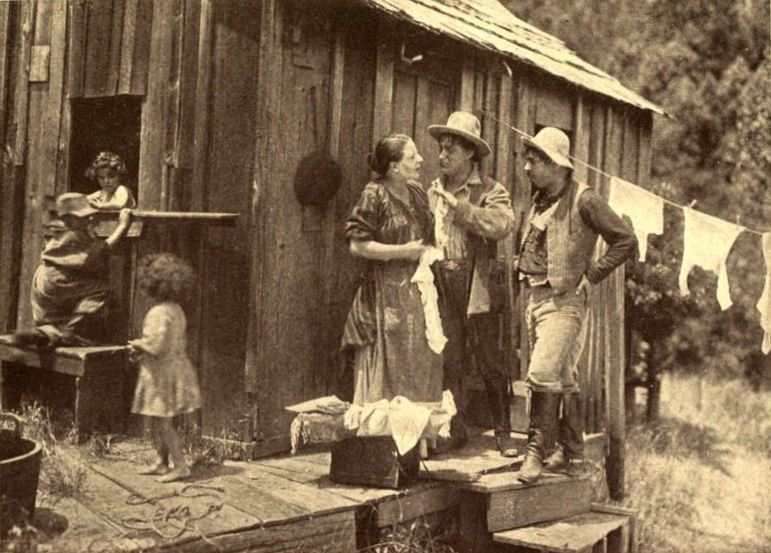
Beyers (third from right) in still for Salomy Jane (1914)

== Filmography ==
- The Field Foreman (1913)
- Just a Song at Twilight (1914)
- The Reform Candidate (1914)
- The Rector's Story (1914) (as Clara Byers)
- Salomy Jane (1914) (as Clara Byers)
- Mignon (1915)
- The Bribe (1915)
- The Lily of Poverty Flat (1915)
- Under Southern Skies (1915) (as Clara Byers)
- The Meddler (1915)
- The Law of Life (1916)
- The Strength of the Weak (1916) (as Clara Byers)
- His Brother's Pal (1916)
- The Crimson Trail (1916)
- Autumn (1916) (as Clara Byers)
- His World of Darkness (1916)
- Half a Rogue (1916)
- A Double Fire Deception (1916)
- His Picture (1916)
- The Crystal's Warning (1916)
- The Come On (1916)
- Temptation and the Man (1916)
- The Narrow Path (1916)
- The Broken Spur (1916)
- Cheaters (1916) (as Clara Byers)
- Little Miss Nobody (1917)
- The Beautiful Impostor (1917)
- To the Highest Bidder (1917)
- The Sporting Life (1918)
- L'apache (1919)
- What Women Want (1920)
- The Black Bag (1922)
