= Josias J. Andrews =

American politician

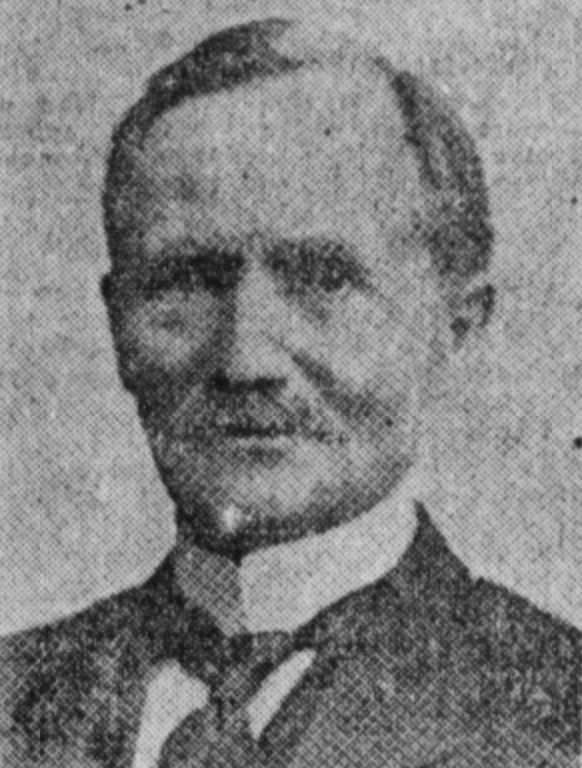
- Andrews in 1909

Member of the Los Angeles City Council for the at-large district
- In office December 10, 1909 – July 1, 1913

Personal details
- Born: May 5, 1841 County Monaghan, Ireland
- Died: January 24, 1919 (aged 77) Los Angeles, California
- Spouse: Anna W. Anthony (m. 1873)
- Children: 2 (including Ann)
- Education: Cornell College; University of Michigan

Josias J. "Jerry" Andrews (May 5, 1841 – January 24, 1919) was an American politician who served on the Los Angeles City Council from 1909 to 1913. During his time on the City Council, he introduced a motion to eliminate all brickyards in Victoria Park, which later became the basis of Hadacheck v. Sebastian, a case that was sent to the U.S. Supreme Court.

== Early life and career ==
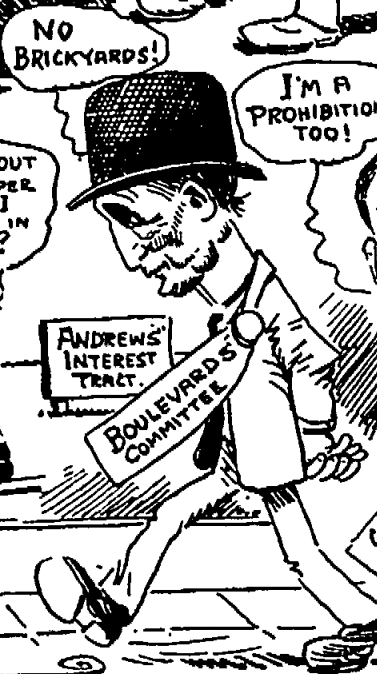
Cartoon of Andrews in 1910.

Andrews was born on May 5, 1841, in County Monaghan, Ireland to John Girault Andrews and Martha Mitchell Andrews. He came with his family to the United States in 1854, settling in the Clyde Township in Illinois. In 1864, he enlisted in the Union Army as a first sergeant in the 140th Illinois Infantry Regiment, later being discharged months later at Camp Fry. He settled in Iowa, attending and graduating from Cornell College, before briefly becoming a superintendent of schools in Lyons, Iowa before resigning to study law at the University of Michigan. After his studies, he returned to Iowa and became superintendent of schools in Toledo, Iowa, where he became aquatinted with George Alexander. Later on, he moved to California in 1890 and practiced real estate business, continuing his business ventures after moving to Los Angeles.

== Political career ==
In April 1909, Andrews was chosen by Mayor George Alexander to be part of the Board Of Police Commissioners. In December 1909, Andrews ran for Los Angeles City Council after the government was reformed to have an at-large district and a nonpartisan election system. He was re-elected for a second term in 1911. During his time as councilmember, he introduced a motion to eliminate all brickyards in the Victoria Park tract, with the law passing to prohibit brick-making altogether in which J. C. Hadacheck, a brick-maker, was convicted of a misdemeanor. Hadacheck sued the city, and the case went to the U.S. Supreme Court, who sided with the city and the city's police department.

== Personal life ==
Andrews married Anna W. Anthony, a cousin of Susan B. Anthony, on December 11, 1873, in Geneseo Township, Illinois. The couple had two children, Jesselyn and Ann; Ann later became a stage actress. In 1919, Andrews was struck by a car while he was in Lynwood, and later died because of his injuries a week later.
