= The Man Unconquerable =

1922 film by Joseph Henabery

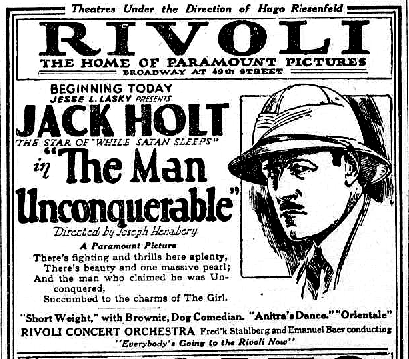
- Directed by: Joseph Henabery
- Screenplay by: Julien Josephson; Hamilton Smith
- Starring: Jack Holt; Sylvia Breamer; Clarence Burton; Anne Schaefer; Jean De Briac; Edwin Stevens
- Cinematography: Faxon M. Dean
- Production company: Famous Players–Lasky Corporation
- Distributed by: Paramount Pictures
- Release date: July 2, 1922
- Running time: 60 minutes
- Country: United States
- Language: Silent (English intertitles)

The Man Unconquerable is a 1922 American silent drama film directed by Joseph Henabery and written by Julien Josephson and Hamilton Smith. The film stars Jack Holt, Sylvia Breamer, Clarence Burton, Anne Schaefer, Jean De Briac, and Edwin Stevens. The film was released on July 2, 1922, by Paramount Pictures.

== Plot ==
Silent Era describes the film as a South Seas drama.

From a newspaper story of the era: "The police force of the island in question is limited to three men of assorted uniforms and arms, who would rather do anything than face danger. Many parts of the world are no better policed and the comparative freedom from fear of punishment makes these gentry bold and aggressive. Jack Holt, in the role of Robert Kendall, shows how a man who believes that the same conditions of comparative honesty and freedom from danger obtain on the island as elsewhere, and finds himself mistaken, runs into a situation where he has to take the law into his own hands. When out in one of his boats, he provides himself with a machine gun and in one encounter with pearl pirates, sinks their schooner when they try to drive him away from his own pearl concession."

== Cast ==
- Jack Holt as Robert Kendall
- Sylvia Breamer as Rita Durand
- Clarence Burton as Nilsson
- Anne Schaefer as Duenna
- Jean De Briac as Perrier
- Edwin Stevens as Michaels
- Willard Louis as Governor of Papeete

== Filming troubles ==
From a period newspaper: "Famous Plea Fruitless. "Don't give up the ship." This time this was not the appeal of the famous Perry, but Clarence Burton's instructions, and he found them difficult to carry out, especially when the ship gave him up-by sinking. Burton, together with a gang of men who took the parts of pearl divers, was in command of a pearling tug in the new Paramount picture, "The Man Unconquerable." As usual, Burton was the villain. Jack Holt, the star of the picture, in an armed launch gave him battle. Presently the tug commenced to sink, faster than they had intended. "Stick to it!" yelled Joseph Henabery, the director, hurrying to get the close-ups. But before he could arrive on the scene the tug had gone under. The only close-ups he secured were of Burton and his pearl divers splashing about on the surface trying to remove their clothes so that they could remain afloat. One of the deck hands on the photographer's boat stood by with a boat hook to pull them out when they showed signs of going down for the third time. In order to get a good "shot" of the sinking boat it was necessary to drag it by chains to shallow water at high tide and repair it at low tide. For four days a crew of laborers worked at the job; then they sat disgustedly on the beach while they watched the tug towed out to sea again and resunk -this time, properly and with due regard to the fans."

== Filming locations ==
Beach scenes were shot along Balboa Beach in California.
