= The Unnecessary Sex =

- Directed by: Jack Harvey
- Written by: Maie B. Havey (story)
- Starring: William Garwood; Violet Mersereau
- Distributed by: Universal Film Manufacturing Company
- Release date: October 5, 1915
- Country: United States
- Languages: Silent film English intertitles

The Unnecessary Sex is a 1915 American silent short comedy film directed by Jack Harvey and starring William Garwood and Violet Mersereau.

== Plot ==
John is a writer who believes he does not need women. He moves to a quiet house in the country with two elderly male servants so he can finish his book. He enjoys the silence and is proud of his life without women. His peace ends when he hears a strange cry.

John searches the garden and finds a baby. He brings the child inside but soon feels helpless. He goes to the nearby house and meets a young woman. He asks her for help and she agrees. She calms the baby and gives John a few instructions before leaving.

Days pass and John grows fond of the child. He decides to adopt the baby. The young woman next door sees him with the child and laughs. John tells her the baby belongs to him and says he will raise the child to become a great writer. He plans to name the child William Shakespeare Brown. The woman tells him the baby is a girl.

John decides he cannot keep a girl in his home. The woman offers to take the baby for a while. John soon misses the child and begins visiting the house next door often. Over time John and Violet realize they make good parents together. They marry and raise the child as a family.

== Characters ==
William Garwood as John

Violet Mersereau as Violet
