= A Fallen Idol =

Lost 1919 American silent film

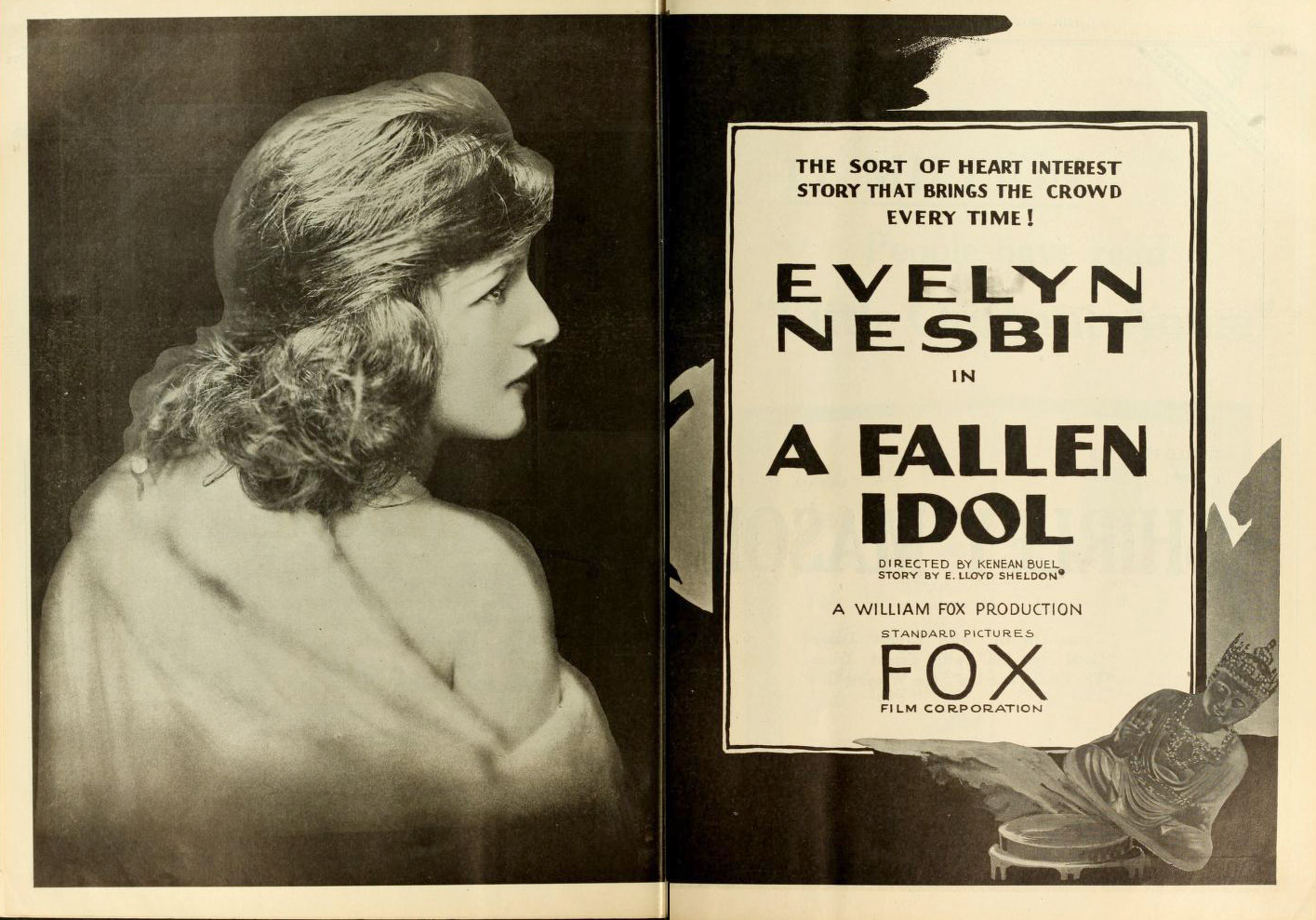
- Directed by: Kenean Buel; John Kellette
- Written by: E. Lloyd Sheldon
- Produced by: William Fox
- Starring: Evelyn Nesbit
- Cinematography: Joseph Ruttenberg
- Distributed by: Fox Film Corporation
- Release date: May 18, 1919
- Running time: 5 reels
- Country: United States
- Language: Silent (English intertitles)

A Fallen Idol is a lost 1919 American silent melodrama film starring Evelyn Nesbit. The plot has some parallels with Nesbit's well-known life story. The story centers around a beautiful woman pursued by two male rivals. She is raped by one of them, a man of wealth and power. Nesbit plays a Hawaiian princess.

== Plot ==
The plot centers around the Hawaiian Princess Laone (Nesbit), whose love for a man named Keith Parrish is thwarted by societal pressure from her benefactor Mrs. Parrish, who is his aunt. Princess Laone is despondent after being persuaded to refuse Keith Parrish's proposal, and she attempts suicide, but is rescued by Keith Parrish. After Parrish leaves town to take care of his father, Princess Laone is told he has abandoned her, and she departs for Hawaii on board the yacht of the dastardly wealthy playboy Stephen Brainard. Princess Laone is forced into having sex with Brainard by being threatened with gang rape by his crew. Keith Parrish is accused of stealing a sacred necklace, but Princess Laone is able to prove that he is innocent and that Brainard was smuggling the necklace. Brainard is arrested and the princess is able to marry Keith Parrish in the end.

== Cast ==
- Evelyn Nesbit as Princess Laone
- Lillian Lawrence as Mrs. Parrish
- Sidney Mason as Keith Parrish
- Lyster Chambers as Stephen Brainard
- Pat J. Hartigan as Brainard's Chief Mate
- Harry Semels as Tushau
- Thelma Parker as Lato
- Marie Newton as Elsie Blair
- Fred C. Williams as Keith's Father

== See also ==
- 1937 Fox vault fire
