= The Haunted Manor (1916 film) =

1916 film by Edwin Middleton

- Directed by: Edwin Middleton
- Written by: C. A. Nelson
- Starring: Buck Jones; Shirley Grey; Robert Ellis
- Production company: Gaumont
- Distributed by: Mutual Film Corporation
- Release date: April 3, 1916
- Running time: 5 reels
- Country: United States
- Language: English

The Haunted Manor is a silent drama film released in 1916. It was produced by Gaumont and released through the Mutual Film Company. Filming took place in Jacksonville and St. Augustine, Florida. It was directed by Edwin Middleton. Part of the movie plot is set in India.

It is the first film known to include Earl Schenck.

== Cast ==
- Iva Shepard
- Earl Schenck
- Henry W. Pemberton
- William H. Hopkins
- Gertrude Robinson
- Robert Clugston
- Olive Trevor, her film debut
