= The Boy Girl =

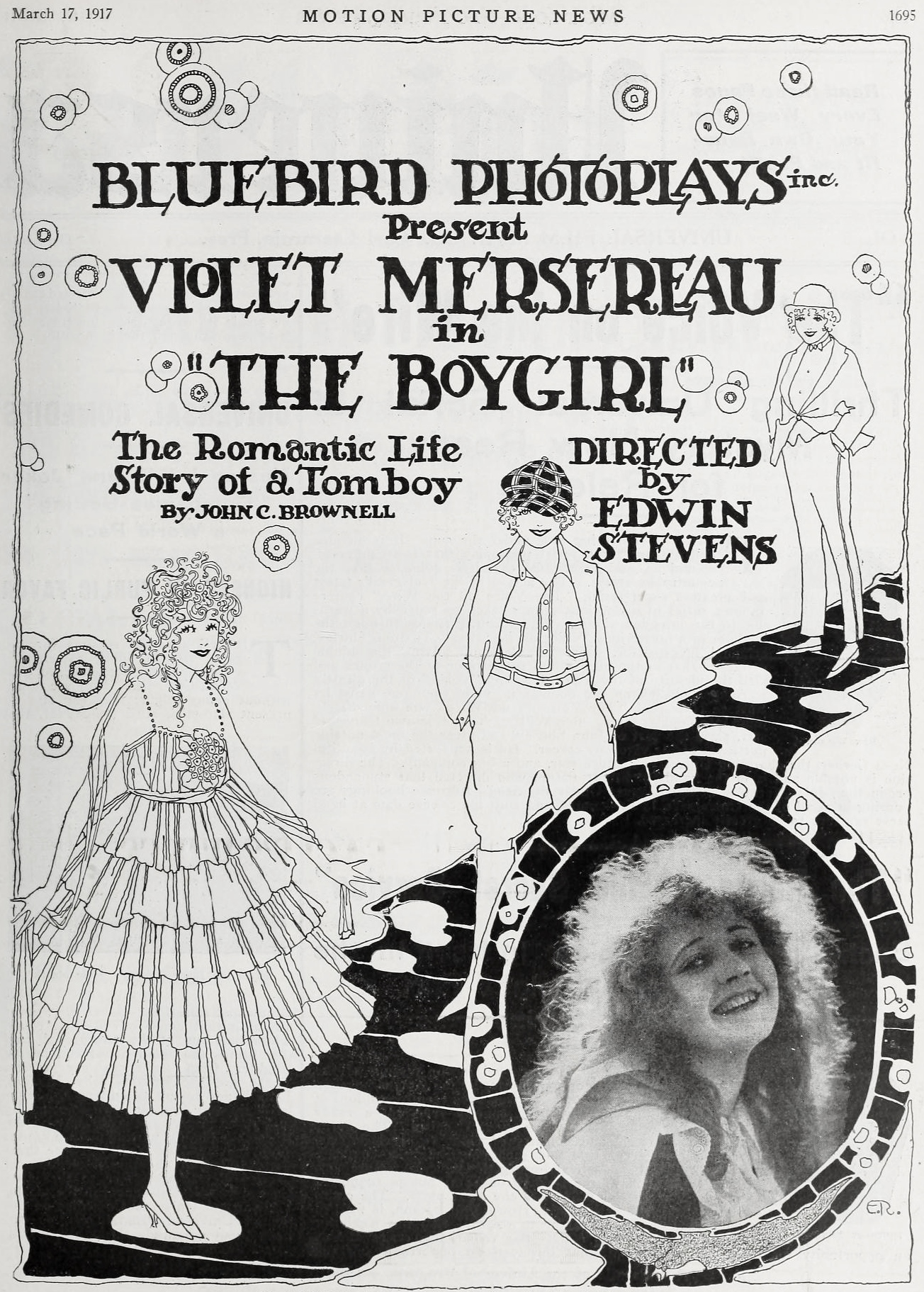
- Directed by: Edwin Stevens
- Written by: John C. Brownell
- Starring: Violet Mersereau; Sidney Mason; Florida Kingsley
- Cinematography: Louis Ostland
- Production company: Universal Pictures
- Distributed by: Universal Pictures
- Release date: March 5, 1917
- Running time: 50 minutes
- Country: United States
- Languages: Silent; English intertitles

The Boy Girl is a 1917 American silent comedy film directed by Edwin Stevens and starring Violet Mersereau, Sidney Mason and Florida Kingsley. Merserau portrays a tomboy who is controlled by two aunts after her father dies and leaves her an inheritance. The love story finds her escaping and heroically aiding her mate.

== Plot summary ==
Channing, her name affectionately shortened to "Jack," is the daughter of King Channing. Jack's mother died when the girl was born. King Channing desired a son when Jack arrived, he accordingly raised his daughter as a boy. At 16, she still continued to be dressed in boy's clothes. One day she met Bob Ridgeway, son of Channing's aristocratic neighbors, shortly after King Channing died. His will bequeathed his fortune to Jack, to be held in trust, with her two maiden aunts as guardians of the girl, until she shall become of legal age or shall marry. Life with Jack's maiden aunts is almost unbearable. They decide that she be sent to boarding school, and for a time, in her new surroundings (being now properly dressed in girl's clothes), Jack is contented. But the restraint finally palls upon her, and she runs away from school. She finds board and lodging with a woman who has, as another paying guest, a girl who has just left a position in the office of Ridgeway and Son. Jack is advised to apply for the position. This she does and is given employment. The affairs of Ridgeway and Son have been going from bad to worse. They are nearly at the point of disaster, when matters take an unexpected turn. There is a valuable piece of mining property they can secure at a great bargain. Bob goes west, and secures from the owner of the property his promise to sell at a definite figure, but Bob cannot secure an option. The secrets of Ridgeway and Son have been "leaking" through the conduct of the chief clerk, who sells to a rival firm the information he cunningly contrives to secure. That Ridgeway and Son want to buy the copper property becomes known to their business rivals. The Ridgeways are lacking in funds. Jack has a plan, and proposes it to Bob. They shall marry and draw enough of Jack's fortune to pay for the property. The proposal is so daring that it fairly takes Bob's breath, but he has loved the girl from the day he met her in the woods, and she has likewise loved him. Bob and Jack marry, but when it comes to going west with the money to close the deal, the elder Ridgeway is so ill that Bob cannot leave him. So Jack makes the trip, beats the Ridgeways' rivals to the property, and secures the deed. When Jack returns home, the elder Ridgeway is restored to health, largely a result of Jack's cleverness in saving the firm from bankruptcy. The closing scene shows Jack moving in social life.

== Cast ==
- Violet Mersereau as 'Jack' Channing
- Sidney Mason as Bob Ridgeway
- Florida Kingsley as Agatha Channing
- Caroline Harris as Martha Channing
- Maud Cooling as Mrs. J. Ridgeway
- Tina Marshall as Catherine Ridgeway
- Charles Mason as King Channing
- James O'Neill as Albert Corey
- Dean Raymond as John Ridgeway
- Byron Dean as Algernon Week

== Bibliography ==
- Langman, Larry. American Film Cycles: The Silent Era. Greenwood Publishing, 1998.
