= Her Own Free Will =

1924 film directed by Paul Scardon

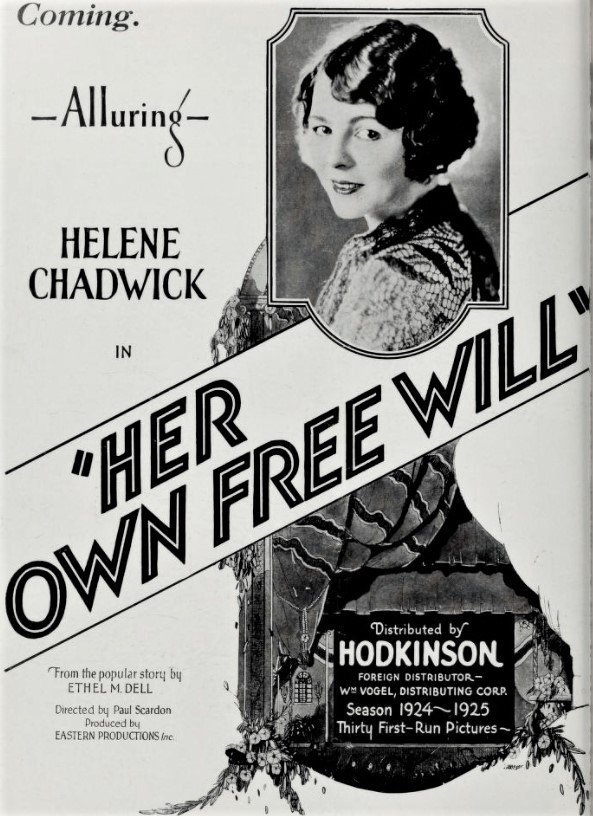
- Advertisement
- Directed by: Paul Scardon
- Written by: Gerald C. Duffy
- Based on: Her Own Free Will by Ethel M. Dell
- Starring: Helene Chadwick; Holmes Herbert; Violet Mersereau
- Cinematography: J. Roy Hunt
- Production company: Eastern Productions
- Distributed by: Producers Distributing Corporation
- Release date: July 20, 1924
- Running time: 68 minutes
- Country: United States
- Language: Silent (English intertitles)

Her Own Free Will is a 1924 American silent drama film directed by Paul Scardon and starring Helene Chadwick, Holmes Herbert, and Violet Mersereau. It was based on a novel of the same name by the British writer Ethel M. Dell.

== Cast ==
- Helene Chadwick as Nan Everard
- Holmes Herbert as Peter Craddock
- Allan Simpson as Jerry Lister
- George Backus as Col. Everard
- Violet Mersereau as Mona Everard

== Preservation ==
With no copies of Her Own Free Will located in any film archives, it is a lost film.

== Bibliography ==
- Goble, Alan. The Complete Index to Literary Sources in Film. Walter de Gruyter, 1999. ISBN 3-598-11492-3
