= The Stake =

- Starring: William Garwood; Violet Mersereau
- Distributed by: Universal Film Manufacturing Company
- Release date: February 12, 1915
- Country: United States
- Languages: Silent film English intertitles

The Stake is a 1915 American silent short drama film starring William Garwood in the lead role with Violet Mersereau.
