= Earl Schenck =

American actor

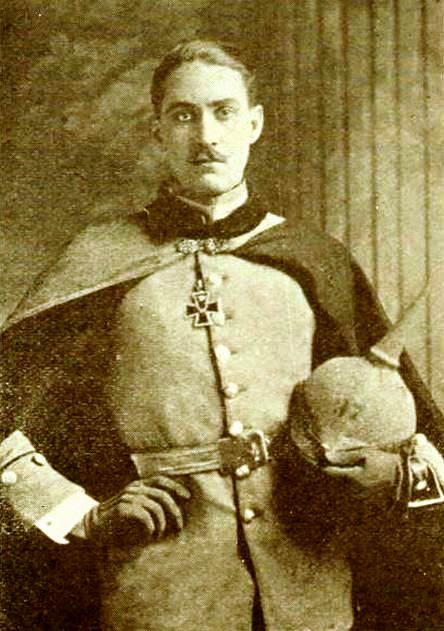
- Schenck in the war film The Great Victory, Wilson or the Kaiser? The Fall of the Hohenzollerns (1919)
- Born: May 13, 1889
- Died: 1962 (aged 72–73); Tahiti
- Occupation: Actor

Earl O. Schenck (13 May 1889 – c. 1962) was an American film actor. He appeared in 41 films between 1916 and 1946.

== Career ==
After playing leading roles on Broadway and in Hollywood during the Silent era opposite such stars as Mae Murray, Mae Marsh, Norma Talmadge, Alla Nazimova and Marion Davies, Schenck developed "Klieg light eyes". Threatened with total blindness, he interrupted a distinguished stage career and went to Hawaii to rest.

In the South Seas he found a new career as an explorer and ethnologist. He secured a roving commission from the Bishop Museum in Honolulu, the leading museum in the world in Polynesian research, to make miniatures and gather artifacts of various Polynesian Islands and spent fourteen years traveling from island to island. During this time, Schenck also contributed to the National Geographic and other magazines.

Returning to his homeland after twenty years of wandering, Schenck won success in still another field as a lecturer on the South Seas and, during the war, served the U.S. Navy Department in planning bases in the Southwest Pacific. For nine months, he also worked with the U.S. Maritime Commission as a government speaker in shipyards and factories to speed up production.

He returned to his career as a motion picture actor with Metro-Goldwyn-Mayer in 1943, on an "actor-writer" contract.

After suffering from several strokes, Schenck retired to Tahiti where he died in 1962 at the age of 72.

== Partial filmography ==
- The Haunted Manor (1916)
- The False Friend (1917)
- The Unbeliever (1918)
- My Four Years in Germany (1918)
- To Hell with the Kaiser! (1918)
- Kaiser's Finish (1918)
- The Trap (1919)
- The Great Victory (1919)
- The Harvest Moon (1920)
- The Blue Pearl (1920)
- Buried Treasure (1921)
- Beyond (1921)
- No Woman Knows (1921)
- Lucky Carson (1921)
- Good Women (1921)
- At the Sign of the Jack O'Lantern (1922)
- Salomé (1923)
- Ashes of Vengeance (1923)
- The Song of Love (1923)
- Yankee Madness (1924)
- Dollar Down (1925)
- Tides of Passion (1925)
- The Hunted Woman (1925)
- The Heavenly Body (1945)

== Bibliography ==
- Come Unto These Yellow Sands - Boobs-Merril, 1940.
- Lean With the Wind - Whittlesey House, 1945.
- Weeds of Violence - Doubleday & Company, Inc., 1949
