= John C. Brownell =

American dramatist (1877–1961)

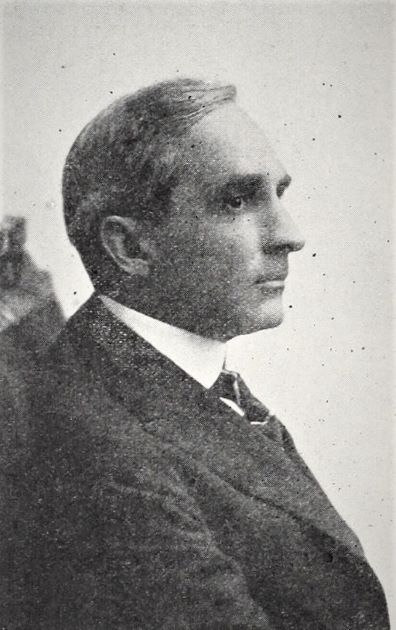
- Brownell in a February 1926 magazine
- Born: February 5, 1877; Burlington, Vermont, U.S.
- Died: August 27, 1961 (aged 84); Starksboro, Vermont, U.S.
- Occupations: Actor; writer

John C. Brownell (February 5, 1877 – August 27, 1961) was an American actor and writer who had a career in theater and film in the U.S. Yale University has a collection of his papers. Brownell was born in Burlington, Vermont. He wrote several plays. He worked in the film industry for Universal Films and Film Booking Offices of America. He died in Starksboro, Vermont.

== Theater ==
- Her Majesty the Widow
- Mississippi rainbow : a modern comedy of Negro life (1938)
- The Nut Farm
- A Woman of the Soil

== Selected filmography ==
(as screenwriter)

- The Honor of Mary Blake (1916)
- Susan's Gentleman (1917)
- The Boy Girl (1917)
- The Girl by the Roadside (1917)
- The Raggedy Queen (1917)
- Little Miss Nobody (1917)
- Bad Company (1925)
- Three of a Kind (1925)
- The King of the Turf (1926)
- Bitter Sweets (1928)
- Out with the Tide (1928)
- The Nut Farm (1935)
