= Little Miss Nobody (1917 film) =

- Directed by: Harry F. Millarde
- Written by: Alfred Solman; Robert F. Roden; John C. Brownell
- Starring: Violet Mersereau; Clara Beyers; Helen Lindroth
- Cinematography: Harry Forbes
- Production company: Universal Pictures
- Distributed by: Universal Pictures
- Release date: May 7, 1917
- Running time: 50 minutes
- Country: United States
- Languages: Silent; English intertitles

Little Miss Nobody is a 1917 American silent drama film directed by Harry F. Millarde and starring Violet Mersereau, Clara Beyers and Helen Lindroth.

== Cast ==
- Violet Mersereau as Bonnie
- Clara Beyers as Elinor Grenville
- Helen Lindroth as Charlotte Wharton
- Sidney Mason as Arthur Wharton
- Dean Raymond as George Grenville
- John Mackin as Bull Dorgan
- James O'Neill as Joe Gaskell
- Robert Clugston as Billy Hamilton
- Willis Baker as Dr. Morley

== Bibliography ==
- Robert B. Connelly. The Silents: Silent Feature Films, 1910-36, Volume 40, Issue 2. December Press, 1998.
