= Clay Dollars =

1921 film

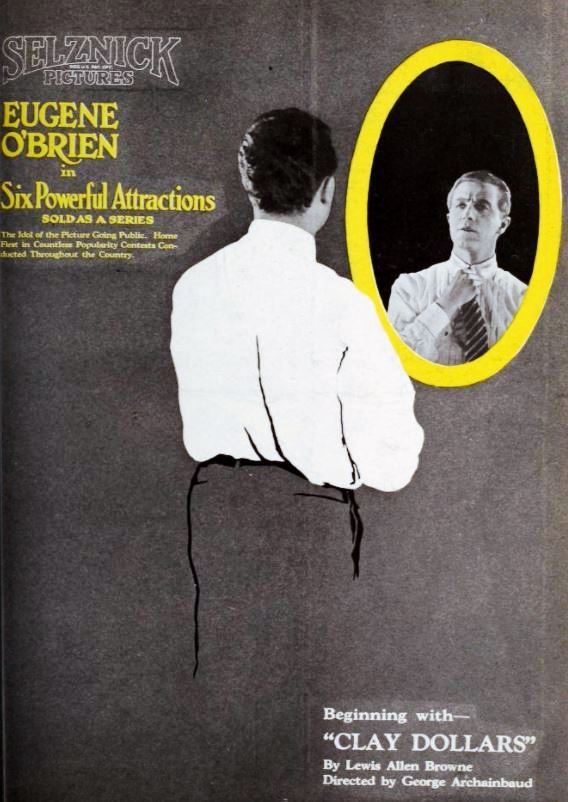
- Directed by: George Archainbaud
- Written by: Lewis Allen Browne
- Produced by: Lewis J. Selznick
- Starring: Eugene O'Brien; Ruth Dwyer; Frank Currier
- Cinematography: Jules Cronjager
- Production company: Selznick Pictures
- Distributed by: Selznick Pictures
- Release date: October 20, 1921
- Running time: 50 minutes
- Country: United States
- Languages: Silent; English intertitles

Clay Dollars is a 1921 American silent drama film directed by George Archainbaud and starring Eugene O'Brien, Ruth Dwyer and Frank Currier. It was shot at studios in Fort Lee, New Jersey.

== Cast ==
- Eugene O'Brien as Bruce Edwards
- Ruth Dwyer as June Gordon
- Frank Currier as Sam Willetts
- Arthur Housman as Ben Willetts
- Jim Tenbrooke as Lafe Gordon
- Florida Kingsley as Mrs. Gordon
- Tom Burke as Buck Jones
- Jerry Devine as Peter
- Bruce Reynolds as Village Cut-up

== Bibliography ==
- Munden, Kenneth White. The American Film Institute Catalog of Motion Pictures Produced in the United States, Part 1. University of California Press, 1997.
