= Her Unwilling Husband =

1920 film

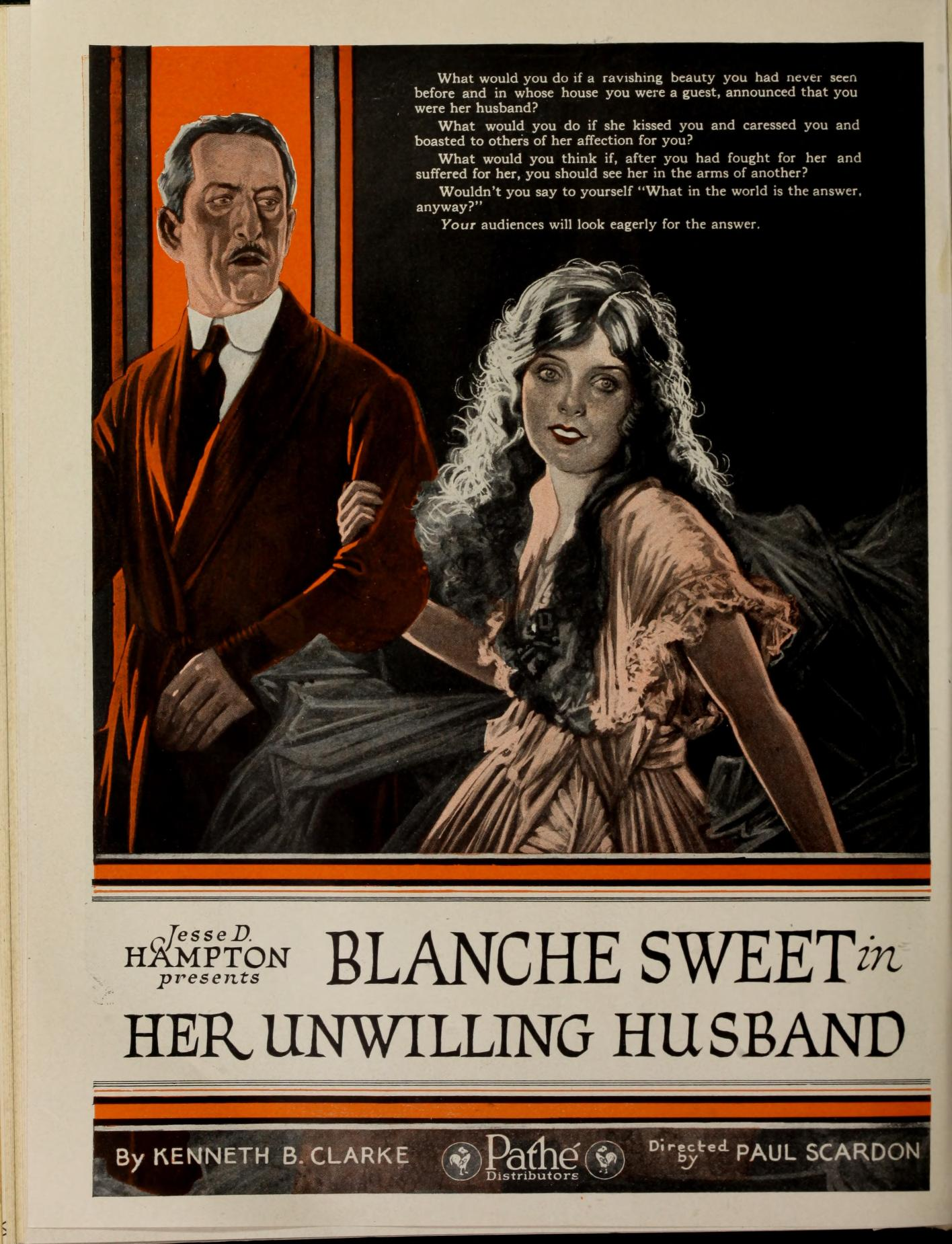
- Directed by: Paul Scardon
- Written by: Kenneth B. Clarke
- Produced by: Jesse D. Hampton
- Starring: Blanche Sweet; Alan Roscoe; Edwin Stevens
- Cinematography: Victor Milner
- Production company: Jesse D. Hampton Productions
- Distributed by: Pathé Exchange
- Release date: November 21, 1920
- Running time: 50 minutes
- Country: United States
- Language: Silent (English intertitles)

Her Unwilling Husband is a 1920 American silent comedy film directed by Paul Scardon and starring Blanche Sweet, Alan Roscoe, and Edwin Stevens.

== Cast ==
- Blanche Sweet as Mavis
- Alan Roscoe as Homer Owen
- Edwin Stevens as John Jordan

== Preservation ==
This film is now lost.

== Bibliography ==
- Donald W. McCaffrey & Christopher P. Jacobs. Guide to the Silent Years of American Cinema. Greenwood Publishing, 1999. ISBN 0-313-30345-2
