= My Unmarried Wife =

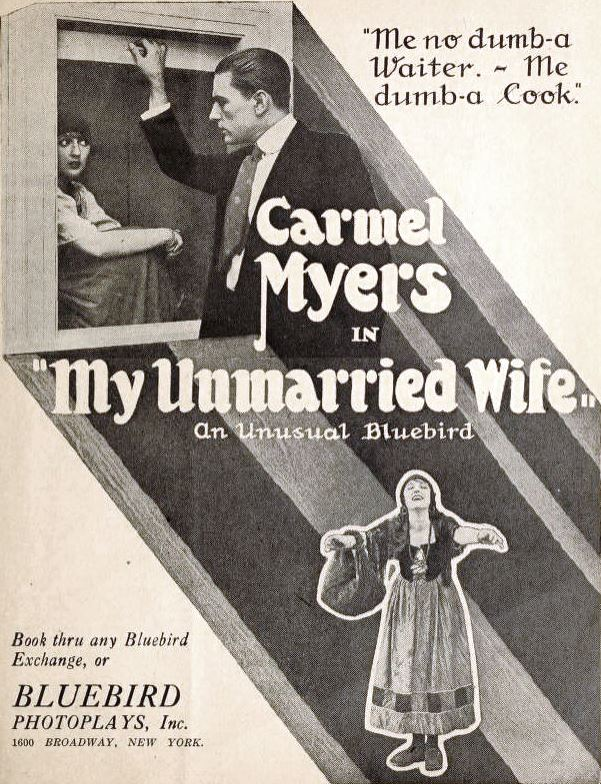
- Directed by: George Siegmann
- Written by: Doris Schroeder
- Based on: novel Molly and I and the Silver Ring by Frank R. Adams
- Produced by: Bluebird Photoplays
- Starring: Carmel Myers
- Cinematography: Roy Klaffki
- Distributed by: Bluebird Photoplays
- Release date: January 7, 1918
- Running time: 50 minutes
- Country: USA
- Language: Silent..English titles

My Unmarried Wife is a 1918 silent film drama directed by George Siegmann and starring Carmel Myers. The film was based on the novel Molly and I and the Silver Ring by Frank R. Adams.

== Cast ==
- Carmel Myers as Mary Cunningham
- Kenneth Harlan as Phillip Smith
- Beatrice Van as ?unknown role
- Pat Calhoun as Jack Herrick
- Mark Fenton as Dr. Allen
- Jack Hutchinson as Tonio

== Preservation status ==
- A complete print is preserved at the George Eastman House in Rochester, New York.
