= Edwin Stevens (actor) =

American actor and director

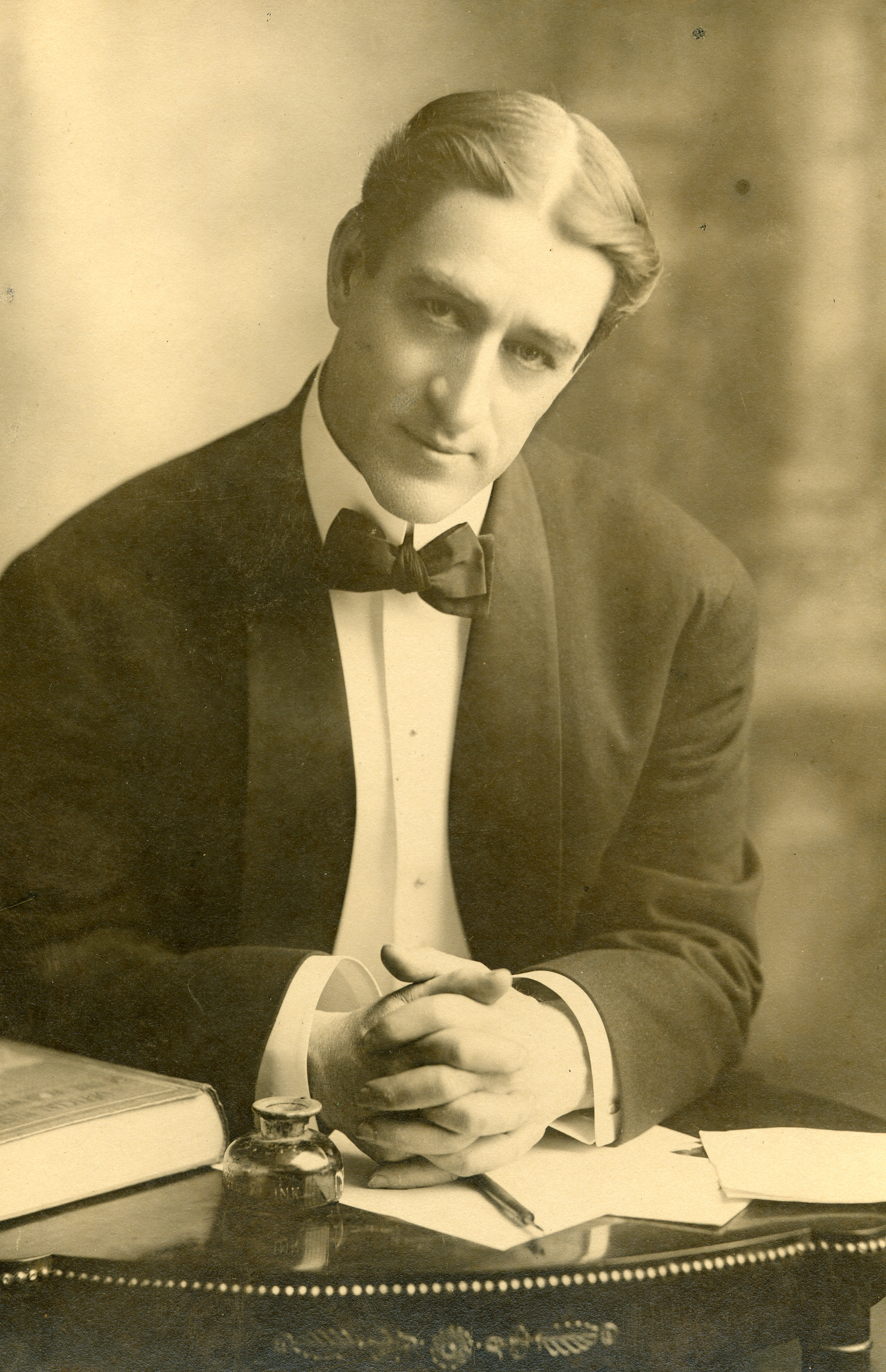
- Stevens in the 1900s
- Born: August 16, 1860; San Francisco, California, U.S.
- Died: January 3, 1923 (aged 62); Los Angeles, California, U.S.
- Occupations: Actor; Director
- Years active: 1916–1925
- Spouse: Louise Weller
- Children: 2

Edwin Stevens (August 16, 1860 – January 3, 1923) was an American stage and film actor. He also directed several films during the silent era. His Broadway performance credits included The Marquis Imari in The Geisha (1896 and 1913 revival), Robert Hutton in Brother Officers (1900 and 1901 revival), Professor Belliarti in Captain Jinks of the Horse Marines (1901), Baron Stein in Diplomacy (1901), Hang Chow in A Chinese Honeymoon (1902), Muley Mustapha in Nancy Brown (1903), Colonel Villiers in Sweet Kitty Bellairs (1903), McGinty in The Pearl and the Pumpkin (1905), the title role in Ferenc Molnár's The Devil (1908), the Sheriff of Nottingham in Reginald De Koven's Robin Hood, and the Honorable Henry Villiers in Kitty Darlin' (1917).

== Selected filmography ==
=== Actor ===
- The Man Inside (1916)
- The Devil's Toy (1916)
- The Yellow Menace (1916)
- The Squaw Man (1918)
- Cheating Cheaters (1919)
- The Lone Wolf's Daughter (1919)
- The Crimson Gardenia (1919)
- The Homebreaker (1919)
- Faith (1919)
- Upstairs (1919)
- The Profiteers (1919)
- Love Insurance (1919)
- Her Kingdom of Dreams (1919)
- Sahara (1919)
- The Unpardonable Sin (1919)
- Duds (1920)
- Passion's Playground (1920)
- The Figurehead (1920)
- Her Unwilling Husband (1920)
- Her First Elopement (1920)
- The Charm School (1921)
- The Sting of the Lash (1921)
- What's Worth While? (1921)
- One Wild Week (1921)
- The Dollar-a-Year Man (1921)
- Crazy to Marry (1921)
- Everything for Sale (1921)
- The Little Minister (1921)
- The Golden Gallows (1922)
- A Game Chicken (1922)
- The Ragged Heiress (1922)
- The Man Unconquerable (1922)
- The Hands of Nara (1922)
- The Voice from the Minaret (1923)
- The Spider and the Rose (1923)
- The Woman of Bronze (1923)
- Quicksands (1923)
- A Lover's Oath (1925)

=== Director ===
- The Honor of Mary Blake (1916)
- Susan's Gentleman (1917)
- The Boy Girl (1917)

== Bibliography ==
- Langman, Larry. American Film Cycles: The Silent Era. Greenwood Publishing, 1998.
