= The Little Terror =

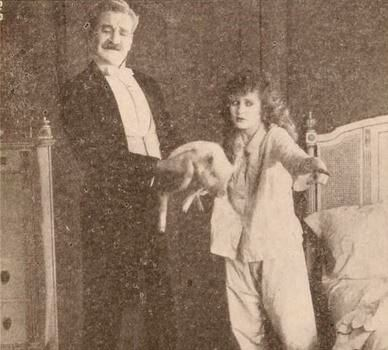
- Directed by: Rex Ingram
- Written by: Rex Ingram
- Starring: Violet Mersereau; Sidney Mason; Ned Finley
- Cinematography: Harry Forbes
- Production company: Universal Pictures
- Distributed by: Universal Pictures
- Release date: July 23, 1917
- Running time: 50 minutes
- Country: United States
- Languages: Silent; English intertitles

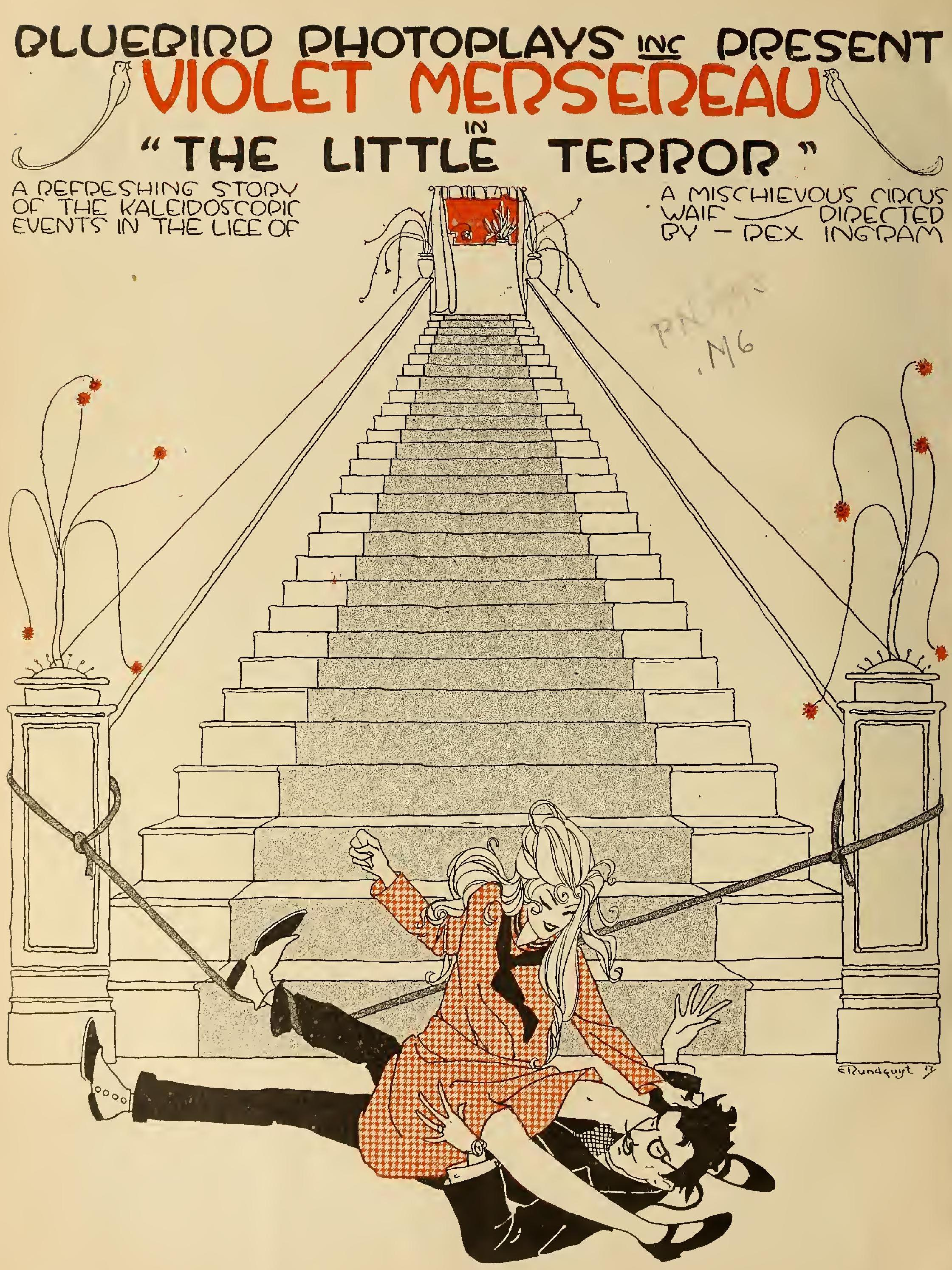
The Little Terror 1917 ad in Motion Picture News

The Little Terror is a 1917 American silent drama film directed by Rex Ingram and starring Violet Mersereau, Sidney Mason and Ned Finley.

== Cast ==
- Violet Mersereau as Tina and Alice
- Sidney Mason as George Reynolds
- Ned Finley as John Saunders
- Robert Clugston as Wallace Saunders
- Ed Porter as The Manager
- John Raymond as Archibald Watkins
- Mathilde Brundage as Mrs. Watkins

== Bibliography ==
- Robert B. Connelly. The Silents: Silent Feature Films, 1910-36, Volume 40, Issue 2. December Press, 1998.
