= The King of the Turf =

1926 film by James P. Hogan

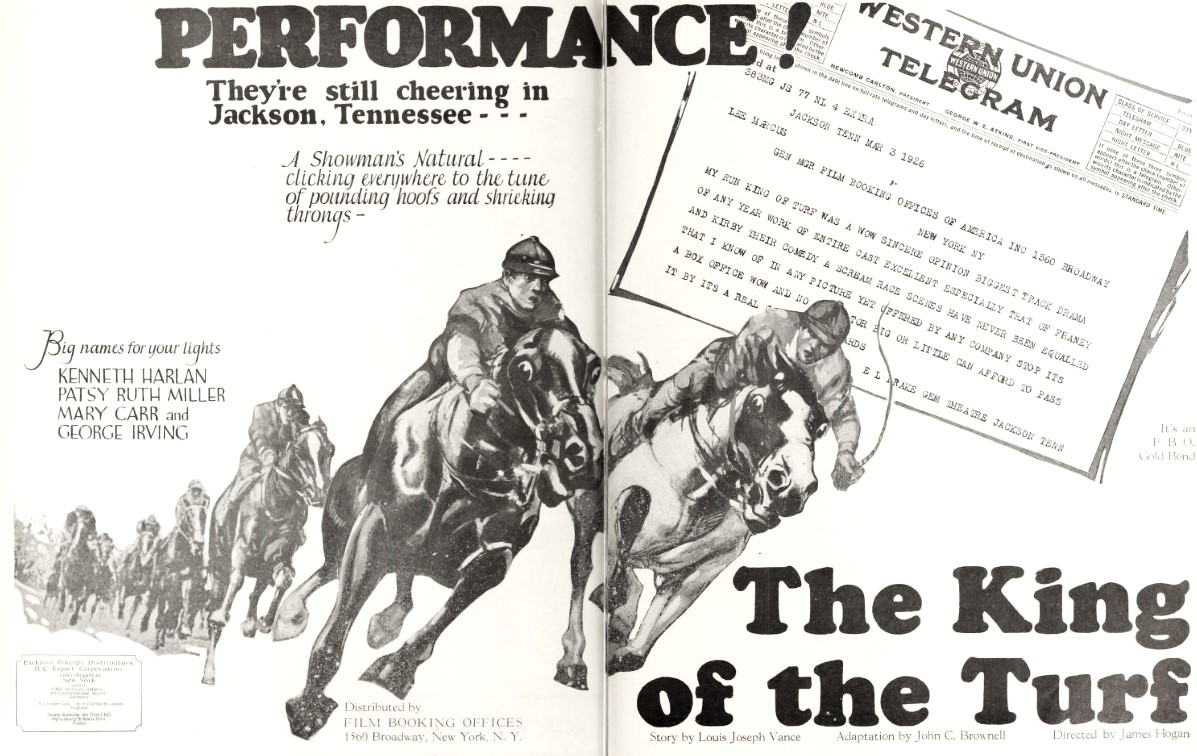
- Advertisement
- Directed by: James P. Hogan
- Screenplay by: John C. Brownell; Louis Joseph Vance; J. Grubb Alexander
- Starring: George Irving; Patsy Ruth Miller; Kenneth Harlan; Alan Roscoe; Kathleen Kirkham; Mary Carr
- Cinematography: Jules Cronjager
- Production company: Robertson-Cole Pictures Corporation
- Distributed by: Film Booking Offices of America
- Release date: February 28, 1926
- Running time: 70 minutes
- Country: United States
- Language: Silent (English intertitles)

The King of the Turf is a 1926 American drama film directed by James P. Hogan and written by John C. Brownell, Louis Joseph Vance, and J. Grubb Alexander. The film stars George Irving, Patsy Ruth Miller, Kenneth Harlan, Alan Roscoe, Kathleen Kirkham and Mary Carr. The film was produced by Robertson-Cole Pictures Corporation and released on February 28, 1926, by Film Booking Offices of America.

== Plot ==
As described in a film magazine review, a bank shortage is framed on Colonel Fairfax, the shock making his mind go blank. Martyn Selsby, the actual guilty man, writes a "deathbed confession", which is found and hidden by his wife Letitia. The Colonel returns from prison with three prison mates, one of whom, safecracker John Doe Smith, falls in love with the Colonel’s daughter Kate. He trains the Colonel’s horse for an upcoming race. Numerous exciting incidents occur regarding the signed confession, with which Tom Selsby, Martyn's son and a rival for the young woman’s affections, tries to bribe her into a marriage. The confession is recovered, the horse race won by the Colonel’s entry, and Kate and John are married.

== Cast ==
- George Irving as Colonel Fairfax
- Patsy Ruth Miller as Kate Fairfax
- Kenneth Harlan as John Doe Smith
- Alan Roscoe as Tom Selsby
- Kathleen Kirkham as Letitia Selsby
- Mary Carr as Martha Fairfax
- David Torrence as Martyn Selsby
- David Kirby as Red Kelly
- Billy Franey as Soup Conley
- Eddie Phillips as Dude Morlanti
