= Robert Clugston =

Actor in silent films

Robert Clugston (born April 15, 1889 - Date of death unknown) was an actor in silent films. He had several leading parts and worked for the Fox Film Corporation.

Clugston was born in Elgin, Illinois.

== Selected filmography ==
- The Haunted Manor (1916)
- The Siren (1917)
- The Hunting of the Hawk (1917)
- Little Miss Nobody (1917)
- Kick In (1917)
- The Little Terror (1917)
