= The Ragged Heiress =

1922 silent film

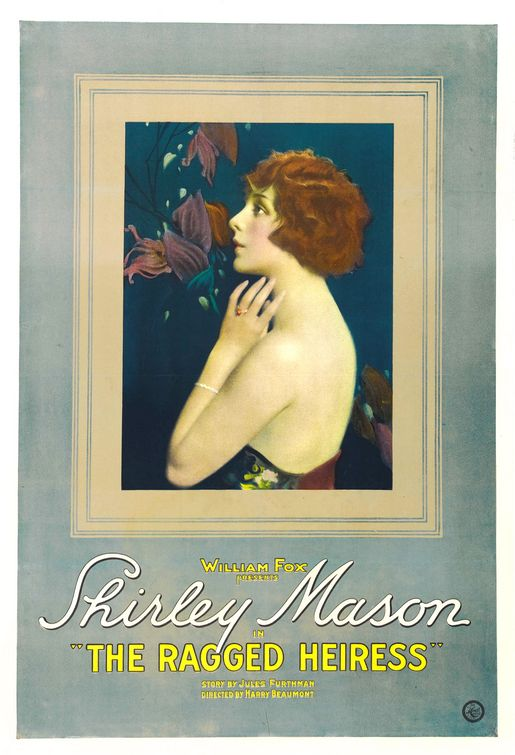
- Directed by: Harry Beaumont
- Written by: Jules Furthman
- Produced by: William Fox
- Starring: Shirley Mason; John Harron; Edwin Stevens
- Cinematography: Lucien N. Andriot
- Production company: Fox Film
- Distributed by: Fox Film
- Release date: March 19, 1922
- Running time: 50 minutes
- Country: United States
- Languages: Silent; English intertitles

The Ragged Heiress is a 1922 American silent drama film directed by Harry Beaumont and starring Shirley Mason, John Harron and Edwin Stevens.

== Cast ==
- Shirley Mason as Lucia Moreton
- John Harron as Glen Wharton
- Edwin Stevens as Sam Moreton
- Cecil Van Auker as James Moreton
- Claire McDowell as Sylvia Moreton
- Aggie Herring as Nora Burke
- Eileen O'Malley as Lucia, age 3

== Bibliography ==
- James Robert Parish & Michael R. Pitts. Film directors: a guide to their American films. Scarecrow Press, 1974.
