= Susan's Gentleman =

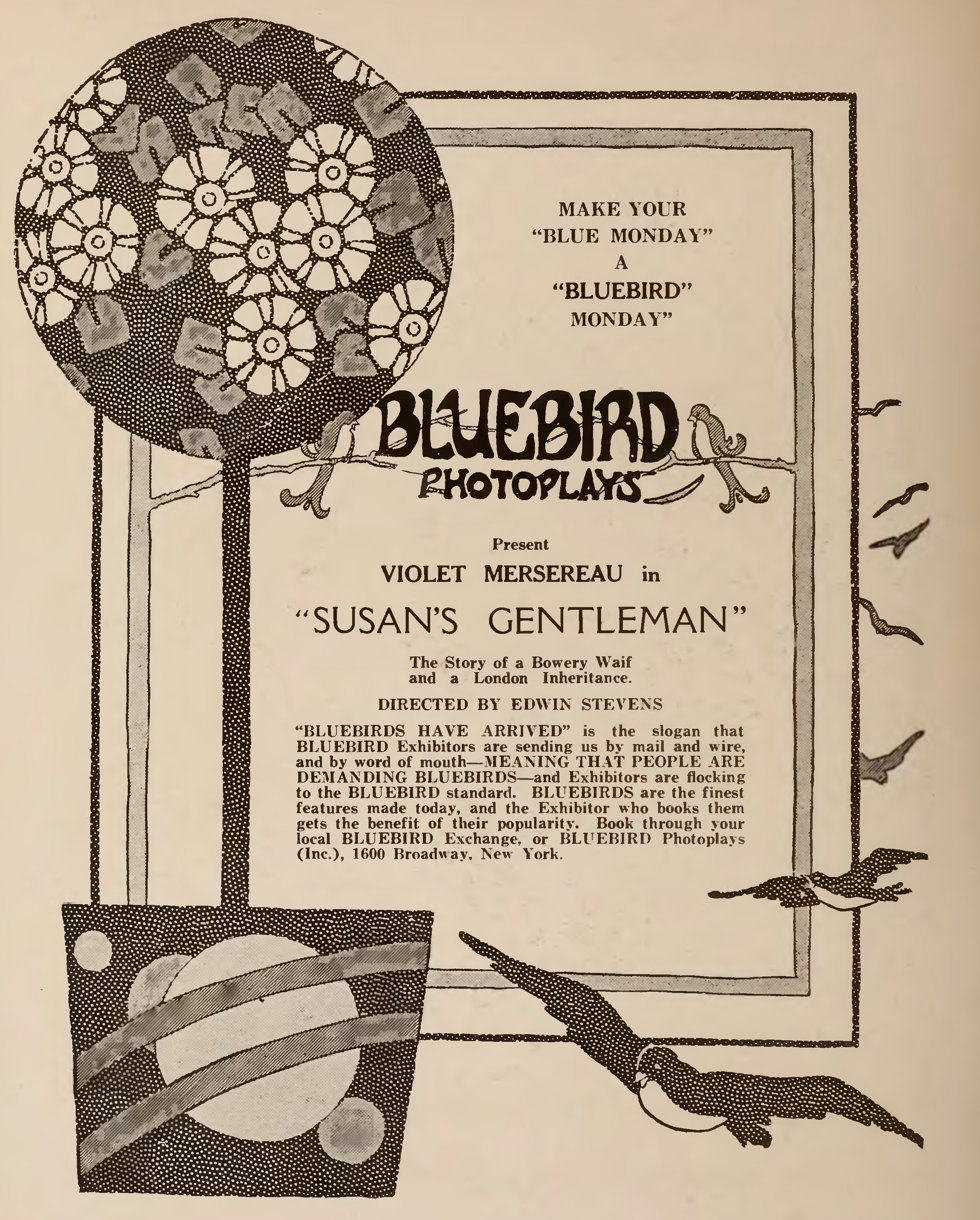
- Directed by: Edwin Stevens
- Written by: John C. Brownell; Kate Jordan(story)
- Produced by: Bluebird Photoplays
- Starring: Violet Mersereau
- Cinematography: Louis Ostland
- Distributed by: Bluebird; Universal Film Manufacturing Company
- Release date: April 2, 1917
- Running time: 5 reels
- Country: USA
- Language: Silent..English titles

Susan's Gentleman is a lost 1917 silent film feature drama directed by Edwin Stevens, a stage actor who made a foray into silent films, and starred Violet Mersereau. It was produced by Bluebird Photoplays and released through the Universal Film Manufacturing Company. This film has an appearance by James O'Neill, famed for The Count of Monte Cristo, here making a rare screen appearance.

== Cast ==
- Violet Mersereau - Nancy Croyden/Susan Flynn
- Maud Cooling - Ora Tourette
- James O'Neill - Sir Jeffrey Croyden
- William O'Neill - Sir Bevis Neville
- Bradley Barker - Terrence Flynn
- Sidney Mason - Tom Neville (*as billed Sydney Mason)
