= Kick In (1922 film) =

1922 film by George Fitzmaurice

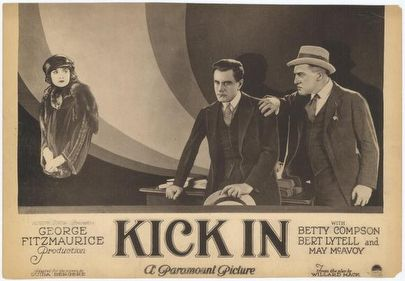
- 1922 lobby poster
- Directed by: George Fitzmaurice
- Written by: Ouida Bergère (adaptation)
- Based on: Kick In by Willard Mack
- Produced by: Adolph Zukor; Jesse L. Lasky
- Starring: Betty Compson; Bert Lytell; May McAvoy
- Cinematography: Arthur C. Miller
- Distributed by: Paramount Pictures
- Release date: December 17, 1922
- Running time: 7 reels
- Country: United States
- Language: Silent (English intertitles)

Kick In is a 1922 American silent crime drama film produced by Famous Players–Lasky, distributed by Paramount Pictures, and starring Betty Compson, Bert Lytell, and May McAvoy. The picture was directed by George Fitzmaurice, who previously directed a 1917 film version of the story. Both films are based on Willard Mack's 1913 play that was produced on Broadway in 1914 starring John Barrymore. The supporting cast features Charles Ogle, who had played the first screen Frankenstein's monster in the original 1910 version of Frankenstein.

A 1931 sound film version was produced with Clara Bow playing Molly.

== Plot ==
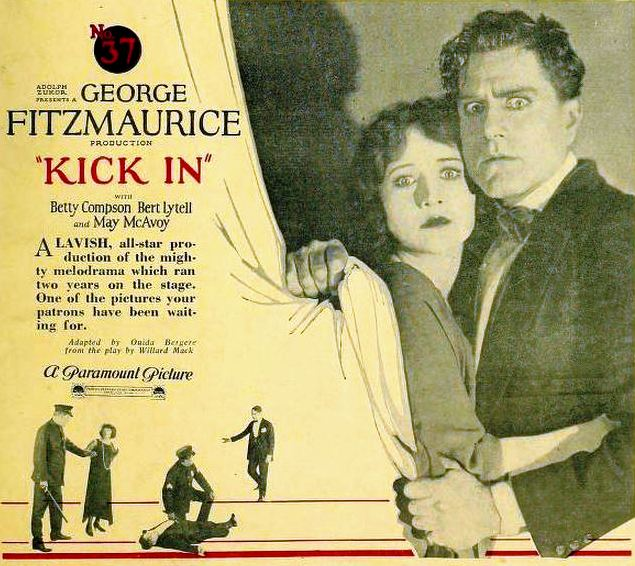
Poster for the film

As described in a film publication, Chick Hewes decides to go straight after being released from Sing Sing, and is anxious to keep his younger brother Benny and his young wife from a life of crime. Chick gets a job, but loses it when he is hounded by the police. Jerry, the son of District Attorney Brandon, while driving with his sister runs over and kills a child in the slum, and the police let him go. Chick vows to see that atonement is made. Intending to crack Brandon's safe, Chick arrives at the residence while a wild party is going on. Brandon's wife travels with a fast set, much to the disgust of their daughter Molly, recently returned from her convent school. Jimmy Monahan, a politician, has eyes for Molly, making dancer Frou Frou jealous. Jerry needs some money so opens his father's safe and Chick sees the youngster pocket cash and gems. Jerry is holding Chick with his gun when Molly appears, and Chick tells her what has happened. Jerry phones for the police, but Chick hides. Chick sees Frou Frou shoot Jimmy in a fit of jealous rage, and Chick holds her until the police arrive. Jerry attempts to frame Chick by placing the loot in his pocket, but Molly sees this and denounces her brother. John Stephens, a western lumber man, offers Chick a job. Chick then finds his brother Benny in the next room has been shot. Benny had come to steal. Chick has the gang remove the body. Detective Fogarty tries to arrest Chick, but Molly explains everything to her father, who orders Chick released. Chick heads west and marries Molly.

== Cast ==
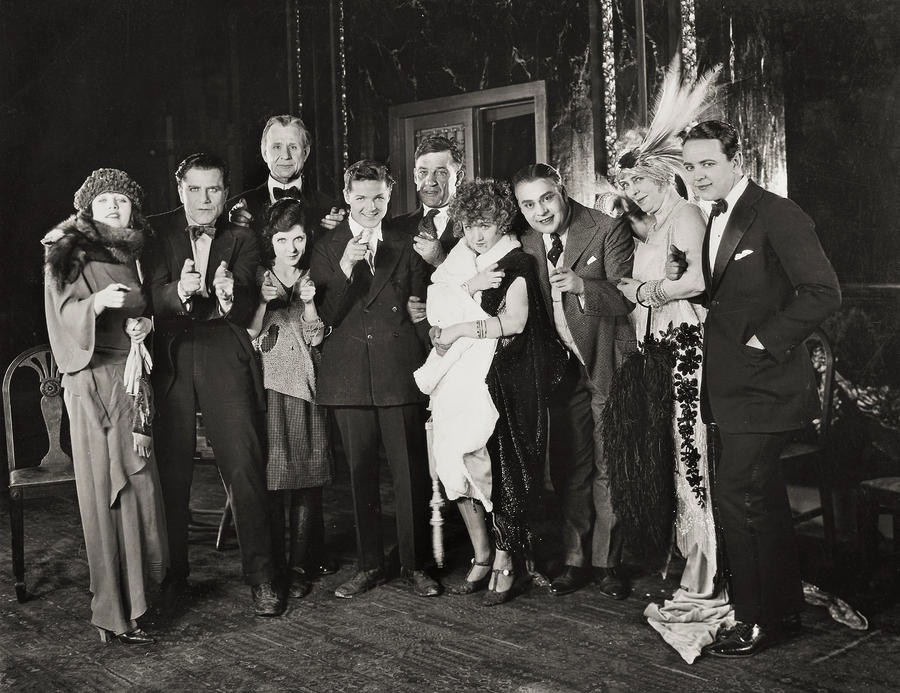
Cast during production, from left: Betty Compson, Bert Lytell, Charles Ogle, May McAvoy, Gareth Hughes, Walter Long, Kathleen Clifford, Jed Prouty, Mayme Kelso and Robert Agnew

- Betty Compson as Molly Brandon
- Bert Lytell as Chick Hewes
- May McAvoy as Myrtle
- Gareth Hughes as Benny
- Robert Agnew as Jerry Brandon
- John Miltern as District Attorney Brandon
- Charles A. Stevenson as Hansom (the Yegg)
- Jed Prouty as Jimmy Monahan
- Charles Ogle as John Stephens
- Kathleen Clifford as Frou Frou
- Mayme Kelso
- Walter Long as Whip Fogarty
- Carlton S. King as Diggs Murphy

== Preservation status ==
After considered a lost film for decades, a print of this film was discovered at the Gosfilmofond archive in Moscow. A restored copy was gifted to the Library of Congress in 2010. (*Arguably this could be a mistake catalogue and the film could still be amongst the lost.)

== Influence ==
Japanese movie magazine Kinema Junpō (November 21, 1927) suggests that Yasujirō Ozu's first film as director, Blade of Penitence (Zange no yaiba) draws from both Kick In and Les Misérables (directed by Frank Lloyd, 1918) for its basic theme, that of an ex-convict trying to go straight but prevented by circumstances from doing so. Blade of Penitence (now considered a lost film) was a studio assignment that Ozu did not much relish.

== See also ==
- List of rediscovered films
