= Kick In (1931 film) =

1931 film

- Directed by: Richard Wallace
- Written by: Bartlett Cormack
- Based on: Kick In by Willard Mack
- Produced by: Adolph Zukor; Jesse L. Lasky
- Cinematography: Victor Milner
- Production company: Paramount Pictures
- Distributed by: Paramount Pictures
- Release date: May 24, 1931
- Running time: 75 minutes
- Country: United States
- Language: English

Kick In is a 1931 American pre-Code drama film produced by Famous Players–Lasky and distributed by Paramount Pictures. The film, based on the 1914 Broadway play by Willard Mack which had starred John Barrymore, was directed by Richard Wallace and starred the legendary Clara Bow in her last film for Paramount Pictures.

The movie was filmed twice in the silent era: a version filmed in 1917 by Pathé and a 1922 version released by Paramount. The 1922 film, lost for over 80 years, was discovered to have been in the Gosfilmofond archive in Moscow and returned to the U.S. in 2010.

The 1931 version of Kick In is currently controlled by Universal Studios, who own or control all Paramount films made between 1929 and 1949. The 1931 Kick In has (as of 2011) never been broadcast on television.

== Cast ==
- Clara Bow as Molly Hewes
- Regis Toomey as Chick Hewes
- Wynne Gibson as Myrtle Sylvester
- Juliette Compton as Piccadilly Bessie
- Leslie Fenton as Charlie
- James Murray as Benny LaMarr
- Donald Crisp as Police Commissioner Harvey
- Paul Hurst as Detective Whip Fogarty
- Wade Boteler as Detective Jack Davis

uncredited

- Edward LeSaint as Purnell, Chick's Boss
- J. Carrol Naish as Sam
- Ben Taggart as Detective Johnson
- Phil Tead as Burke, Reporter

== Adaptation ==
A one-hour radio adaptation was presented on Lux Radio Theatre on April 6, 1936, featuring Edmund Lowe and Ann Sothern. It was the show's one-hundredth broadcast.
