= Dangerous Business (1920 film) =

Film by Roy William Neill

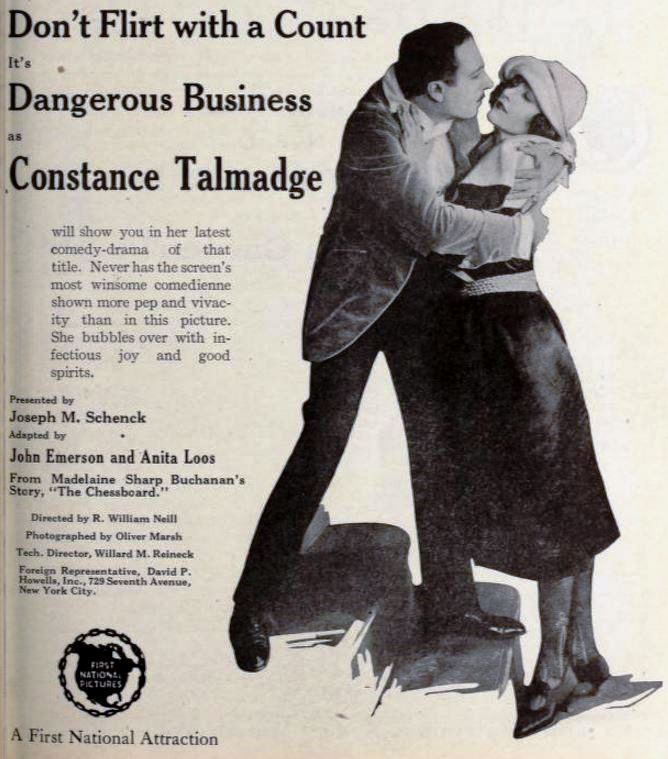
- Directed by: Roy William Neill
- Written by: Madeleine Sharps Buchanan (story); John Emerson; Anita Loos; Charles Ray; Rob Wagner
- Produced by: John Emerson; Anita Loos; Raoul Walsh; Joseph M. Schenck
- Starring: Constance Talmadge; Kenneth Harlan; George Fawcett
- Cinematography: Oliver T. Marsh
- Production company: Norma Talmadge Film Corporation
- Distributed by: First National Pictures
- Release date: November 28, 1920
- Running time: 50 minutes
- Country: United States
- Language: Silent (English intertitles)

Dangerous Business is a 1920 American silent comedy film directed by Roy William Neill and starring Constance Talmadge, Kenneth Harlan, and George Fawcett.

== Plot ==
Clarence Brooks is a shy, timid man working for Mr. Flavell. He is love with Flavell's daughter, Nancy. Nancy is shallow and fickle, always chasing after other, less-upstanding men. Clarence enlists when World War I erupts. While Clarence is off defending his country, Nancy's mother arranges for her daughter to marry the wealthy Mr. Braille. When Braille is drafted, Nancy's mother starts arranging a rush wedding, against Nancy's wishes. Nancy claims that she and Clarence are already secretly married.

When the war is over and Clarence returns home, he refuses to be a part of her charade. When Clarence declines the offer to marry Nancy for real, she must mature to win his affections back.

== Cast ==
- Constance Talmadge as Nancy Flavelle
- Kenneth Harlan as Clarence Brooks
- George Fawcett as Mr. Flavell
- Mathilde Brundage as Mrs. Flavell
- John Raymond as Mr. Braille
- Florida Kingsley as Mrs. Brooks
- Nina Cassavant as Genevieve

== Preservation ==
There are no listings of Dangerous Business in any film archives, making it a lost film.

== Bibliography ==
- Goble, Alan. The Complete Index to Literary Sources in Film. Walter de Gruyter, 1999.
