= Bluebird Photoplays =

American film production company

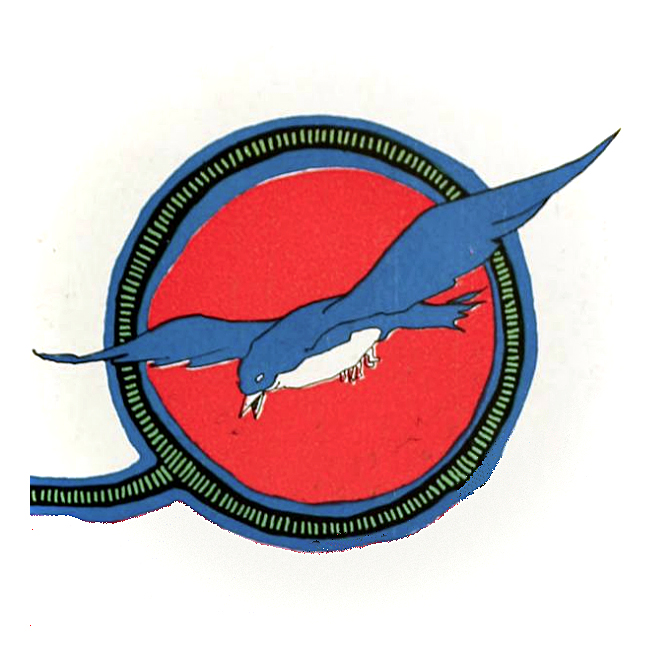
- Logo from BlueBird Magazine Ad
- Trade name: Bluebird Photoplays
- Industry: Film
- Predecessor: Independent Moving Pictures
- Defunct: Branding ceased in the 1920s
- Fate: Universal Branding abandoned
- Successor: Universal
- Headquarters: California; New Jersey, United States
- Number of locations: 2
- Area served: Worldwide
- Products: Motion pictures
- Owner: Universal Film Manufacturing Company
- Parent: Universal Film Manufacturing Company

Bluebird Photoplays (Bluebird Photoplays of New York, Inc. and Bluebird Photoplays of New England, Inc.) was an American film production company that filmed at Universal Pictures studios in California and New Jersey, and distributed its films via Universal Pictures during the silent film era. It had a $500,000 studio in New Jersey.

"It was a subsidiary of Universal Pictures and employed Universal stars (and starlets) and used Universal’s facilities but the pictures were marketed independently from Carl Laemmle’s umbrella company."—Anke Brouwers

Mary MacLaren, was one of its stars. Louise Lovely, an actress from Australia, was one of its stars. Bluebird was a prestige brand for Universal and had a core of actors and directors including Lovely who worked for it. Ida May Park directed for Bluebird Photoplays. Elsie Jane Wilson produced and directed for Bluebird Photoplays. Among those who worked for this short-lived subsidiary of Universal are Carmel Myers, Mae Murray, Rudolph Valentino, Tod Browning, Rex Ingram, Robert Z. Leonard and Rupert Julian.

Louis B. Mayer invested in the company. M. H. Hoffman managed the company.

== Filmography ==
- Jeanne Doré, (1915)
- Shoes (1916)
- Undine (1916)
- The Yaqui (1916)
- Mother o' Mine (1917)
- The Flashlight (1917)
- A Doll's House (1917)
- Flirting with Death (1917)
- Hell Morgan's Girl (1917)
- A Kentucky Cinderella (1917)
- Susan's Gentleman (1917)
- The Mysterious Mrs. M (1917)
- The Girl in the Checkered Coat (1917)
- Broadway Love (1918)
- The Winner Takes All (1918)
- My Unmarried Wife (1918)
- The Raggedy Queen (1918)
- Wife He Bought (1918)
- Beans (1919)
- The Game's Up (1919)

== Gallery ==
Trade advertisements

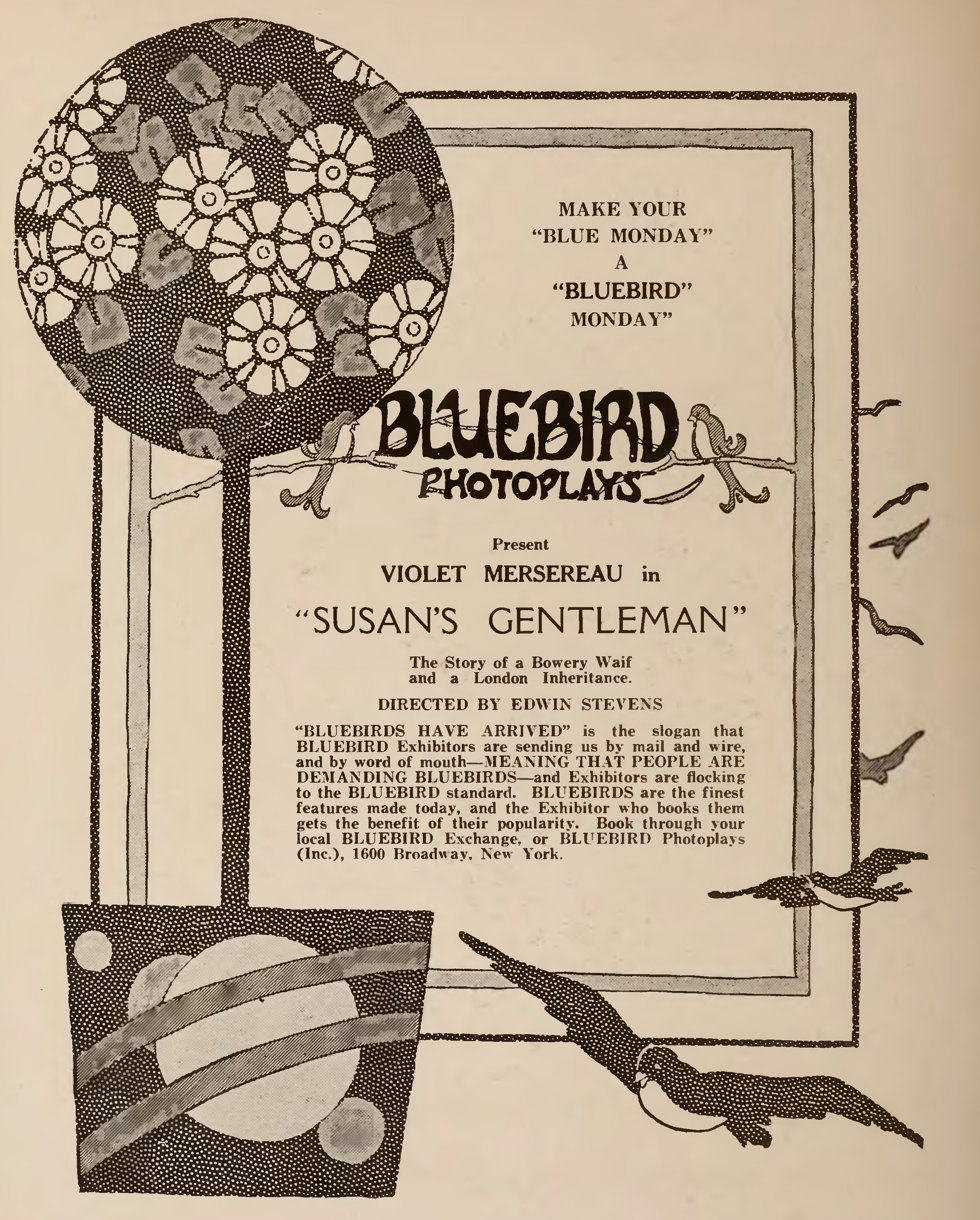
Susan's Gentleman,
movie ad,
Moving Picture Weekly

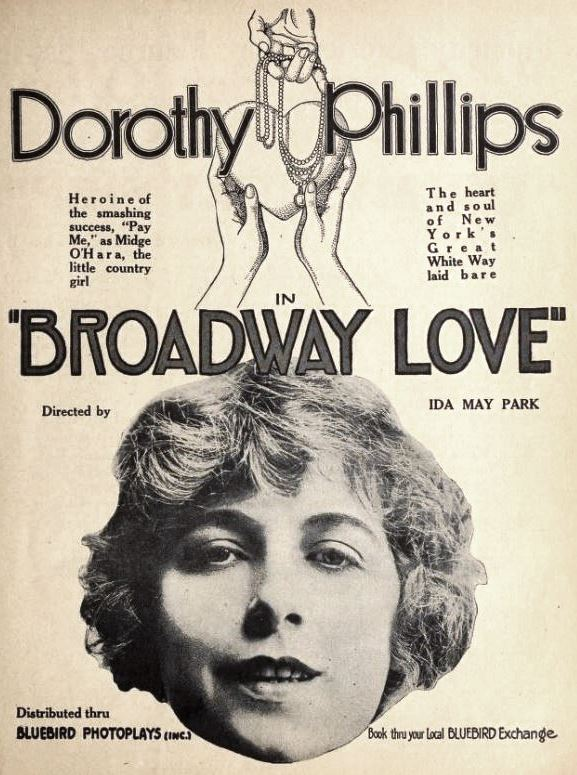
Broadway Love,
Trade advertisement,
2 February 1918,
The Moving Picture Weekly

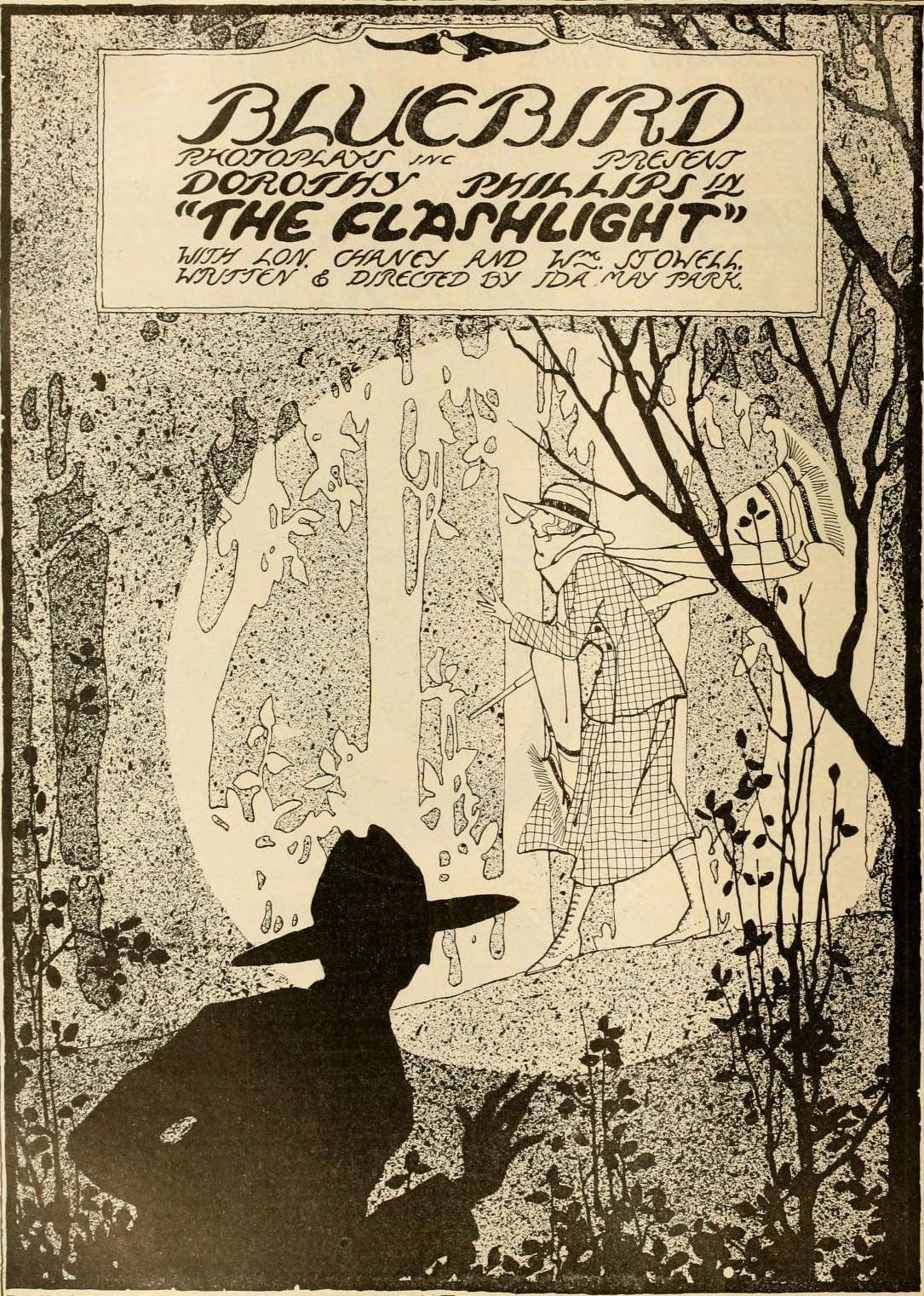
Ad for The Flashlight (1917)

== See also ==
- Butterfly Pictures
