= Kick In (1917 film) =

- Directed by: George Fitzmaurice
- Written by: Ouida Bergère
- Based on: Kick In (play) by Willard Mack
- Starring: William Courtenay
- Cinematography: Arthur C. Miller; John W. Boyle
- Production company: Astra Film
- Distributed by: Pathé Exchange
- Release date: January 14, 1917
- Running time: 50 minutes
- Country: USA
- Language: Silent

Kick In is a 1917 American silent crime melodrama film directed by George Fitzmaurice and starring William Courtenay. It is based on the 1914 Broadway play of the same name by Willard Mack. Fitzmaurice and Ouida Bergère, who adapted the play to the screen, re-adapted the story in 1922.

== Cast ==
- William Courtenay - Chick Hewes
- Robert Clugston - Benny
- Mollie King - Molly Cary
- Richard Taber - Charlie (*as Richard Tabor)
- Suzanne Willa - Myrtle Sylvester
- John W. Boyle - Commissioner Garvey

== Preservation ==
With no prints of Kick In located in any film archives, it is considered a lost film. In February 2021, the film was cited by the National Film Preservation Board on their Lost U.S. Silent Feature Films list.

== See also ==
- Kick In (1922)
- Kick In (1931)
