= Ann Andrews =

American actress (1890–1986)

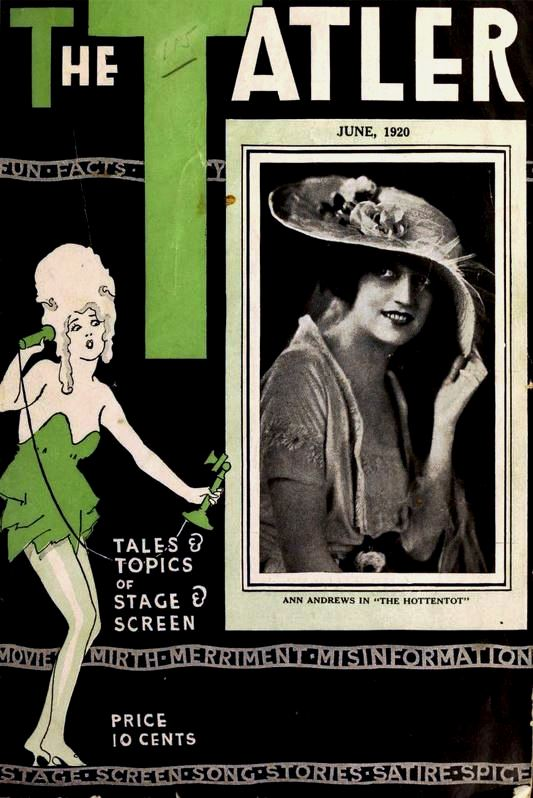
- Ann Andrews on the cover of June 1920 issue of The Tatler.
- Born: October 13, 1890; Los Angeles, California, U.S.
- Died: January 23, 1986 (aged 95); New York City, U.S.
- Resting place: Kensico Cemetery, Valhalla, New York
- Occupation: Actress
- Years active: 1916-1947

Ann Andrews (October 13, 1890 – January 23, 1986) was an American stage actress.

== Biography ==
Andrews's parents were Josias J. Andrews and Ann (née Anthony). She attended Frank Egan's Dramatic School in Los Angeles and made her stage debut in 1916 in the same city. Her New York debut was at the Bandbox Theatre on Broadway in the play Nju in 1917, in the same title role that she had played when the play opened in Los Angeles. She appeared in the Broadway debut of several hit plays i.e. The Hottentot (1920), The Captive (1926), The Royal Family (1927), Dinner at Eight (1932).

Andrews acted in stock theater, including a company at the Lyceum in Rochester, New York, and in summer theater circuits that included Bucks County and Cape Cod. She appeared in only two films throughout her career and remained essentially a stage actress.

Andrews died in New York City at the age of 95 and was interred at Kensico Cemetery, Valhalla, New York.
