= Everything for Sale (1921 film) =

1921 film

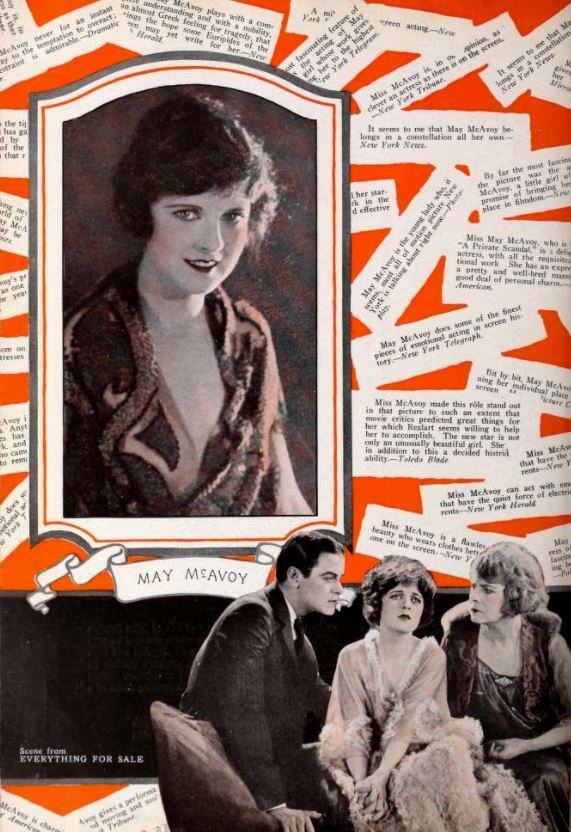
- Advertisement
- Directed by: Frank O'Connor
- Screenplay by: Hector Turnbull
- Starring: May McAvoy; A. Edward Sutherland; Kathlyn Williams; Edwin Stevens; Richard Tucker; Betty Schade
- Cinematography: Harold Rosson
- Production company: Realart Pictures Corporation
- Distributed by: Paramount Pictures
- Release date: September 25, 1921
- Running time: 50 minutes
- Country: United States
- Language: Silent (English intertitles)

Everything for Sale is a 1921 American silent drama film directed by Frank O'Connor, in his directorial debut, and written by Hector Turnbull. The film stars May McAvoy, A. Edward Sutherland, Kathlyn Williams, Edwin Stevens, Richard Tucker, and Betty Schade. The film was released on September 25, 1921, by Paramount Pictures.

== Plot ==
According to the American Film Institute, the film revolved around Helen, freshly graduated from school, moving with her aunt, Mrs. Wainwright. Her aunt wants Helen to marry Donald Scott, a millionaire. But Helen becomes engaged to Lee, her childhood love, after he parts with Lilian, his mistress. The engagement is eventually broken and Lee returns to Lilian while Helen can now marry Donald.

== Cast ==
- May McAvoy as Helen Wainwright
- A. Edward Sutherland as Donald Scott
- Kathlyn Williams as Mrs. Wainwright
- Edwin Stevens as Mr. Wainwright
- Richard Tucker as Lee Morton
- Betty Schade as Lillian Lord
- Dana Todd as Billy Mitchell
- Jane Keckley as Sarah Calmm

== Production ==
Everything for Sale was filmed partially on location at Del Monte. The film's working title was Happy Ending.

== Preservation ==
With no prints of Everything For Sale located in any film archives, it is considered a lost film.
