= William Addison Lathrop =

American author and playwright

William Addison Lathrop (1864 – January 3, 1925) was an American writer, playwright, and screenwriter for silent films.

Lathrop was born in Cincinnati, Ohio, in 1864 and graduated in 1885 from Hamilton College in Clinton, New York. He taught at Brooklyn Polytechnic until 1891, and then was admitted to the bar. In addition to writing scenarios for silent films in the 1910s, his first novel Love Time in Picardy was published in 1919. Many of his plays were co-written with his wife, Mabel. He died of a heart attack in New York City on January 3, 1925.
