= List of American films of 1912 =

At least eight American feature films, a serial film, and more than 3,590 short films were released in the year 1912.

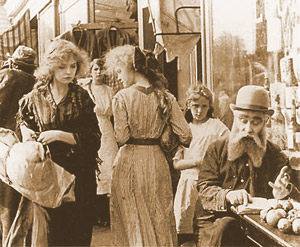
The Musketeers of Pig Alley–the world's first gangster film

== A-L ==
Title	Director	Cast	Genre	Notes
All for a Girl	Frederick A. Thomson	Dorothy Kelly, Leah Baird	Romantic comedy	
At the Foot of the Ladder		Mignon Anderson, William Garwood	Romantic drama	
Aurora Floyd	Theodore Marston	William Garwood, Florence La Badie, Harry Benham	Drama	
Baby Hands		James Cruze, Jean Darnell	Drama	
The Bandit of Tropico		Harry von Meter, Vivian Rich	Adventure	
A Battle of Wits		Tom Moore, Alice Joyce, Earle Foxe	Drama	
The Belle of Bar-Z Ranch	Tom Ricketts	Harry von Meter, Vivian Rich	Western	
A Business Buccaneer		Tom Moore, Alice Joyce	Comedy	
The Charge of the Light Brigade	J. Searle Dawley	James Gordon, Richard Neill	War	
Cleopatra	Charles L. Gaskill	Helen Gardner	Historical drama	feature
Conductor 786		William Garwood, Riley Chamberlin, Jean Darnell	Comedy	
The County Fair		Earle Foxe, Alice Joyce	Drama	
The Cry of the Children	George Nichols	Marie Eline, Ethel Wright, James Cruze	Drama	
The Deserter	Thomas H. Ince	Francis Ford, Ethel Grandin	Western	
Dr. Jekyll and Mr. Hyde	Lucius Henderson	James Cruze	Horror	
The Eternal Mother	D. W. Griffith	Edwin August, Blanche Sweet	Drama	
For His Son	D. W. Griffith	Charles Hill Mailes	Drama	
For the Cause of the South	Bannister Merwin	Laura Sawyer, Benjamin Wilson, Charles Ogle	Romantic drama	
Frankfurters and Quail		William Garwood	Drama	
From the Manger to the Cross	Sidney Olcott	Robert Henderson-Bland		feature
The Half-Breed's Way		Harry von Meter, Vivian Rich, George Beech	Western	
His Only Son	Jack Conway and Milton J. Fahrney	Wallace Reid, Dorothy Davenport	Western	
It Happened Thus		Charlotte Burton, Owen Moore	Romantic drama	
The Land Beyond the Sunset	Harold M. Shaw	Martin Fuller, Mrs. William Bechtel, Walter Edwin, Bigelow Cooper	Drama	
A Leap for Love		Ethel Wright, Frank Hall Crane, Rodman Law	Romantic drama	
The Little Girl Next Door	Lucius J. Henderson	William Garwood, Marguerite Snow	Drama	

== M-Z ==
Title	Director	Cast	Genre	Notes
The Musketeers of Pig Alley	D. W. Griffith	Elmer Booth, Lillian Gish	Drama	
A New Cure for Divorce		William Garwood, Mignon Anderson	Drama	
The New York Hat	D. W. Griffith	Mary Pickford, Lionel Barrymore, Lillian Gish		Based on a scenario by Anita Loos
The Old Bookkeeper	D. W. Griffith	W. Chrystie Miller, Blanche Sweet	Drama	
Oliver Twist		Nat Goodwin	Drama	feature
Petticoat Camp		William Garwood, Florence La Badie	Comedy	
Please Help the Pore		William Garwood, Riley Chamberlin, Mignon Anderson, Marie Eline	Drama	
The Power of Melody		Harry von Meter, Vivian Rich, Eugenie Forde	Drama	
Put Yourself in His Place	Theodore Marston	William Garwood, Marguerite Snow	Drama	
Richard III	André Calmettes	Frederick Warde	Historical drama	feature
Saved from the Titanic	Étienne Arnaud	Dorothy Gibson		
A Six Cylinder Elopement		William Garwood, Riley Chamberlain, Marguerite Snow	Romantic comedy	
Standing Room Only		William Garwood, Mignon Anderson	Drama	
The Star of Bethlehem	Lawrence Marston	Florence La Badie		feature
The Street Singer		Earle Foxe, Alice Joyce	Drama	
The Tell-Tale Message		Earle Foxe, Hazel Neason, Stuart Holmes	Drama	
The Thunderbolt		William Garwood, James Cruze, David Thompson	Drama	
An Unseen Enemy	D. W. Griffith	Lillian Gish, Dorothy Gish		First film to star the Gish sisters
The Voice of Conscience		Florence La Badie, Jean Darnell	Drama	
What Happened to Mary	Charles Brabin	Mary Fuller, Marc McDermott		Serial
When the Heart Calls	Al Christie	Lee Moran, Russell Bassett, Louise Glaum	Western comedy	
With the Mounted Police		William Garwood, Mignon Anderson	Romantic thriller	
The Young Millionaire		Earle Foxe, Alice Joyce	Drama	

== See also ==
- 1912 in the United States
