= List of American films of 1911 =

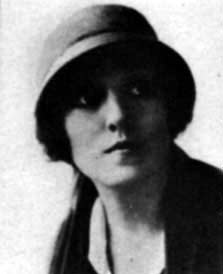
A Tale of Two Cities

More than 2,400 American films were released in 1911, almost all single reel short films.

Title	Director	Cast	Genre	Notes
Baseball and Bloomers		William Garwood, Marguerite Snow	Silent sports	
The Black Arrow: A Tale of the Two Roses	Oscar Apfel	Charles Ogle, Natalie Jerome	Drama	
Brown of Harvard	Colin Campbell	Edgar G. Wynn, Edgar Kennedy	Drama	
Cally's Comet		William Garwood	Drama	
The Coffin Ship		William Garwood	Adventure	
The Colonel and the King		Marie Eline, William Garwood	Drama	
Courting Across the Court		William Garwood	Romantic Comedy	
The Cowboy and the Lady		Alan Hale	Western	
David Copperfield	Theodore Marston	Marie Eline, Florence La Badie, Mignon Anderson, William Russell	Drama	
The Dream	Thomas H. Ince, George Loane Tucker	Mary Pickford, Owen Moore	Drama	
Enoch Arden	D. W. Griffith	Wilfred Lucas, Linda Arvidson	Drama	
Flames and Fortune		Marie Eline, William Garwood	Drama	
For Her Sake		William Garwood		
Her Awakening	D. W. Griffith	Mabel Normand, Harry Hyde	Drama	
The Higher Law	George Nichols	William Garwood, James Cruze	Drama	
His Trust Fulfilled	D. W. Griffith	Wilfred Lucas	Drama	
The Italian Barber	D. W. Griffith	Joseph Graybill, Mary Pickford	Drama	
The Last Drop of Water	D. W. Griffith	Blanche Sweet	Western	
The Last of the Mohicans	Theodore Marston	James Cruze	Drama	
Little Nemo	Winsor McCay		Animation	
The Lonedale Operator	D. W. Griffith		Drama	
The Miser's Heart	D. W. Griffith	Lionel Barrymore	Drama	
The New Superintendent	Francis Boggs	Herbert Rawlinson	Drama	
The Pasha's Daughter		William Garwood	Drama	
The Railroad Builder		William Garwood	Drama	
The Scarlet Letter	Joseph W. Smiley, George Loane Tucker	King Baggot, Lucille Young	Drama	
She	George Nichols	Marguerite Snow	Fantasy	
The Smuggler		William Garwood		
Sweet Memories	Thomas H. Ince	Mary Pickford, King Baggot	Drama	
Swords and Hearts	D. W. Griffith		Drama	
A Tale of Two Cities	William J. Humphrey	Maurice Costello, Florence Turner		
That's Happiness	George Nichols	William Garwood, Bertha Blanchard	Drama	
The Two Paths	D. W. Griffith	Dorothy Bernard, Wilfred Lucas	Drama	
The Voice of the Child	D. W. Griffith	Edwin August	Drama	
What Shall We Do with Our Old?	D. W. Griffith	W. Chrystie Miller	Drama	
Won by Wireless		William Garwood	Thriller	

== See also ==
- 1911 in the United States
