= The Voice of Conscience =

The Voice of Conscience may refer to:

- The Voice of Conscience (1912 film), an American silent short film
- The Voice of Conscience (1917 film), an American silent film
- The Voice of Conscience (1920 film), an Austrian silent film
