= The Higher Law =

The Higher Law may refer to:

- Higher Law Theory, arguing that no written law may be enforced unless it conforms with certain unwritten, universal principles of fairness, morality, and justice
- The Higher Law (1911 film), directed by George Nichols
- The Higher Law (1914 film), a lost film
