= Coffin ship (disambiguation) =

Coffin ship may refer to:

- The Coffin Ship, a 1911 silent film
- Coffin ship, an idiom used to describe the ships that carried Irish and Scottish migrants to the United States
- Coffin ship (insurance), an over-insured vessel that is scuttled in order to make a bogus claim
- Coffin Brig, slang term for the Cherokee-class brig-sloops built for the Royal Navy
