= Riley Chamberlin =

American silent film actor

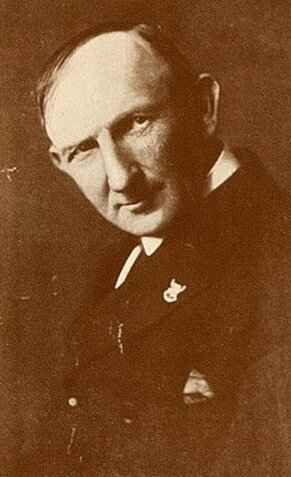
- Born: November 7, 1854; Byron Center, Michigan, U.S.
- Died: January 24, 1917 (aged 62); New Rochelle, New York, U.S.
- Occupation: Actor
- Years active: 1912–1917

Riley Chamberlin (November 7, 1854 – January 24, 1917) was an American silent film actor.

Born in Byron Center, Michigan, he was a graduate of Grand Rapids High School in Grand Rapids, Michigan. He was educated at Clinet College and Cornell University. In 1874 he made his professional debut as an actor at Charles R. Gardiner's Academy of Music in Chicago.

In 1910, billed as Riley Chamberlain, he performed in Lulu's Husbands on Broadway.

In 1912, he began acting in films with the Thanhouser Company at the age of 57, and starred in over 100 films until his death five years later at the age of 62.

== Selected filmography ==
Year	Film	Role	Notes
1912	Why Tom Signed the Pledge	Deacon Prim	
1912	Conductor 786	Conductor 786	
1912	At the Foot of the Ladder	The Debutante's Father	
1912	Please Help the Pore	Henry Snaith, a Wealthy Banker	Alternative title: Please Help the Poor
1912	A Six Cylinder Elopement	Ex-Congressman Gray, The Girl's Father	
1913	The Evidence of the Film	Clerk	
1913	Some Fools There Were	Third Unsuspecting Bachelor	
1913	Her Gallant Knights		
1913	How Filmy Won His Sweetheart	Filmy	
1914	The Elevator Man	Tim - the Elevator Man	
1914	The Strategy of Conductor 786	Conductor 786	
1914	The Benevolence of Conductor 786	Conductor 786	
1914	Naidra, the Dream Woman	The Old Scientist	
1915	The Gratitude of Conductor 786	Conductor 786	
1915	The Conductor's Classy Champion	Conductor 786	
1915	The Conductor's Classy Champion	Conductor 786	
1915	Una's Useful Uncle	Uncle Dan	
1916	Lucky Larry's Lady Love	Lulu's Father	
1916	Theodore's Terrible Thirst	Theodore	
1916	Ruining Randall's Reputation	Rivington Randall	
1916	Dad's Darling Daughters	Dad	
1917	Her New York	Farmer Si Brown	
