= Wild Blood =

Wild Blood may refer to:

== Film ==
- Wild Blood (1915 film), a 1915 American silent short drama film
- Wild Blood (1928 film), a 1928 American silent western film
- Wild Blood (2008 film), a 2008 Italian film

== Literature ==
- Wild Blood, a 1921 novel by Gordon Young
- Wild Blood, a 1994 novel by Nancy A. Collins
- Wild Blood, a 1995 novel by Anne Logston
- Wild Blood (novel), a 1999 fantasy novel by Kate Thompson

== Other media ==
- "Wild Blood", Blood Ties season 2, episode 2 (2007)
- Wild Blood (album), a 2012 album by Lovedrug
- Wild Blood (video game), a 2012 fantasy-themed video game
