= For Her Sake =

For Her Sake may refer to:

- For Her Sake (1911 film), an American silent short war romance film
- For Her Sake (1930 film), a Swedish comedy film
