= Some Fools There Were =

- Directed by: Lucius J. Henderson
- Produced by: Thanhouser Company
- Starring: Florence La Badie; Jean Darnell; William Garwood
- Cinematography: Arthur A. Cadwell
- Distributed by: Mutual Film
- Release date: February 14, 1913
- Country: United States
- Languages: Silent film English intertitles

Some Fools There Were is a 1913 American silent short comedy film starring William Garwood, Riley Chamberlin, Jean Darnell, Florence La Badie, and William Russell.

The movie "tells the adventures of a coquette [(La Badie]) who leaves an assortment of broken hearts in her trail."

== Cast ==
- Florence La Badie as The Girl Reporter
- Jean Darnell as The Aunt
- William Garwood as First Unsuspecting Bachelor
- William Russell as Second Unsuspecting Bachelor
- Riley Chamberlin as Third Unsuspecting Bachelor
