= Destiny's Trump Card =

- Directed by: William Garwood
- Written by: Robert F. Hill
- Produced by: Independent Moving Pictures Co. of America
- Starring: William Garwood; Violet Mersereau
- Distributed by: Universal Film Manufacturing Company
- Release date: 1915
- Country: United States
- Languages: Silent; English intertitles

Destiny's Trump Card is a 1915 American silent short film directed by and starring William Garwood in the lead role with Violet Mersereau.
