= Her New York =

- Directed by: Eugene Moore; O. A. C. Lund
- Written by: Agnes Christine Johnston
- Produced by: Edwin Thanhouser
- Starring: Gladys Hulette; William Parke Jr. Carey L. Hastings
- Cinematography: John M. Bauman
- Production company: Thanhouser Film Corporation
- Distributed by: Pathé Exchange
- Release date: January 7, 1917
- Country: United States
- Languages: Silent; English intertitles

Her New York is a 1917 American silent drama film directed by O. A. C. Lund and Eugene Moore and starring Gladys Hulette, William Parke Jr. and Riley Chamberlin.

== Cast ==
- Gladys Hulette as Phoebe Lester
- William Parke Jr. as Philip Dawes
- Riley Chamberlin as Farmer Si Brown
- Carey L. Hastings as Brown's Wife
- Robert Vaughn as Stuyvesant Owen
- Ethyle Cooke as Laura
- Gerald Badgley as Young Child

== Bibliography ==
- Robert B. Connelly. The Silents: Silent Feature Films, 1910-36, Volume 40, Issue 2. December Press, 1998.
