= The Shoemaker and the Doll =

1913 film

- Written by: Elizabeth Lonergan (Story)
- Starring: William Garwood
- Distributed by: Mutual Film
- Release date: September 21, 1913
- Country: United States
- Languages: Silent film English

The Shoemaker and the Doll is a 1913 American silent short drama film starring William Garwood.
