= Billy's War Brides =

1916 short film by William Garwood

- Directed by: William Garwood
- Written by: Miriam S. Gluck (story); Samuel Greiner (scenario)
- Starring: William Garwood; Sonia Marcelle; Molly Gilmore; Elsie Earl, Tokura Tsuda
- Distributed by: Universal Film Manufacturing Company
- Release date: April 25, 1916
- Country: United States
- Languages: Silent film English intertitles

Billy's War Brides is a 1916 American silent short comedy directed and starring William Garwood. The film also stars Sonia Marcelle and Molly Gilmore.
