= Uncle's New Blazer =

- Directed by: William Garwood
- Starring: William Garwood; Violet Mersereau; Nell Craig
- Distributed by: Universal Film Manufacturing Company
- Release date: May 10, 1915
- Country: United States
- Languages: Silent film English intertitles

Uncle's New Blazer is a 1915 American silent short comedy film directed by and starring William Garwood in the lead role with Violet Mersereau. Nell Craig also starred.
