= A Soul at Stake =

1916 film by William Garwood

- Directed by: William Garwood
- Written by: Calder Johnstone; John Fleming Wilson
- Starring: William Garwood; Andrew Arbuckle; Lois Wilson
- Distributed by: Universal Film Manufacturing Company
- Release date: October 13, 1916
- Country: United States
- Languages: Silent film English intertitles

A Soul at Stake is a 1916 American silent short Oriental drama based on a book written by John Fleming Wilson and scenarioized by Calder Johnstone. It was directed by and starring William Garwood, Andrew Arbuckle and Lois Wilson.
