= His Guardian Auto =

- Directed by: Arthur Ellery and Jack Harvey
- Starring: James Cruze, Ethyle Cooke, and Marguerite Snow
- Production company: Thanhouser Company
- Release date: June 11, 1915
- Country: United States
- Language: Silent

His Guardian Auto is a 1915 American short silent comedy film, directed by Arthur Ellery and Jack Harvey for the Thanhouser Company. It stars James Cruze, Ethyle Cooke, and Marguerite Snow.

== Plot ==
Billy Budd is known as a reckless young man who lives fast and keeps wild company. His friends believe he should reform but no one dares to confront him. Unknown to them Billy’s automobile quietly acts as his guardian and is far more respectable than its owner.

One night Billy stops at a roadside inn for wine and gasoline. When no fuel is available he foolishly fills the car with champagne instead. He then drives off at high speed. The car becomes uncontrollable and the night ends in chaos. Billy later recalls waking to find himself in bed and the car damaged on the floor. He tends to both himself and the vehicle and notices the car now behaves with loyalty and affection.

Later that day Billy steps outside with a woman named Flossie Footlights and suggests a drive. The car suddenly speeds away on its own and carries Billy into the countryside. It stops in front of a quiet farm where Billy meets a young farm girl who smiles at him. This meeting changes his life and marks the beginning of his transformation into a responsible and respectable citizen.

== Characters ==
James Cruze as Billy Budd the Auto Owner.

Ethyle Cooke as Flossie Footlights.

Marguerite Snow as The Country Girl.
