= The Adventure of the Yellow Curl Papers =

1915 American silent film

- Directed by: Clem Easton
- Written by: Clem Easton (Story); Hugh C. Weir (Writer)
- Starring: William Garwood; Violet Mersereau
- Distributed by: Universal Film Manufacturing Company
- Release date: April 23, 1915
- Country: United States
- Languages: Silent film English intertitles

The Adventure of the Yellow Curl Papers (also known as The Mystery of the Yellow Curl Papers) is a 1915 American silent short comedy-drama film directed by Clem Easton. The film stars William Garwood and Violet Mersereau.

The film was based on a short story by Hugh C. Weir. It was distributed by the Universal Film Manufacturing Company, and released on April 23, 1915.

== Cast ==
- William Garwood as Ted
- Violet Mersereau as Flo

== Plot ==
Finding Flo too despondent over the poor business of her stock company to pay any attention to his thirteenth proposal of marriage, Ted determines to enliven business with some shrieking press agent stunt. He has Flo place a hundred-dollar bill in one of her curl papers, and stages a fake robbery, intended to get unlimited space in the newspapers with the story about the leading lady who curls her hair with hundred-dollar bills. Everything runs smoothly until Ted reaches the ground after taking the papers. Here he is pounced upon by the constable, who is on the watch for chicken thieves. Ted breaks away from him, and finds it pretty difficult keeping out of the way of detectives. He is saved from arrest by the apprehension of the real thief. Incidentally, the advertising has drawn attention to Flo's company, and, out of gratitude, she marries Ted.

== Reviews ==
The Motion Picture News said that while the plot is novel it fails to hold the interest, as there is little action, and even that is at times unfathomable. The Springfield News-Sun said it was a prize comedy-drama about an actress who used $100 bills for curl papers. The Daily Gate City praised the film for being a fine play with lots of fun and some real dramatic situations. You'll enjoy every moment of this sterling photoplay.
