= John B. Clymer =

American screenwriter (1887–1937)

- Born: March 6, 1887; Philadelphia, Pennsylvania
- Died: May 24, 1937 (aged 50); Hollywood, California
- Occupation: Screenwriter
- Years active: 1915 - 1937

John B. Clymer (March 6, 1887 – May 24, 1937) was a Hollywood film screenwriter. His career spans the silent film era to the early talking films. His first film The Supreme Impulse was produced in 1915. His last film, The Gentleman Misbehaves, was released posthumously in 1946.

== Biography ==
He was born on March 6, 1887, in Philadelphia, Pennsylvania. He died in Hollywood, California, on May 24, 1937, from a heart attack.

== Selected filmography ==
- Ashes of Embers (1916)
- Reputation (1917)
- The Moth (1917)
- The Duchess of Doubt (1917)
- The Landloper (1918)
- Everywoman's Husband (1918)
- The Lightning Raider (1919)
- What Am I Bid? (1919)
- The Delicious Little Devil (1919)
- The Mystery of 13 (1919)
- The Hawk's Trail (1919)
- The Hope Diamond Mystery (1921)
- Unconquered Woman (1922)
- Hills of Missing Men (1922)
- When Danger Smiles (1922)
- According to Hoyle (1922)
- Duped (1925)
- The Lone Eagle (1927)
- The Wild West Show (1928)
- Phyllis of the Follies (1928)
- A House Divided (1931)
