= Beautiful Bismark =

1913 film

- Starring: William Garwood
- Distributed by: Mutual Film
- Release date: June 17, 1913
- Running time: Short
- Country: United States
- Languages: Silent film English intertitles

Beautiful Bismark is a 1913 American silent short drama film starring William Garwood. It was released by Mutual Films.
