= You Can't Always Tell =

- Directed by: William Garwood
- Starring: William Garwood; Violet Mersereau
- Distributed by: Universal Film Manufacturing Company
- Release date: May 28, 1915
- Running time: 2 reels
- Country: United States
- Languages: Silent film English intertitles

You Can't Always Tell is a 1915 American silent short film directed by and starring William Garwood in the lead role with Violet Mersereau. It is one of several short films that Garwood and Mersereau starred in together and Garwood directed.

== Cast ==
- William Garwood as Harrington Spencer - Reporter
- Violet Mersereau as Violet
- Edna Hunter
- Frederick Sullivan
- Ben Walsh
