= The Wild West Show (film) =

1928 film

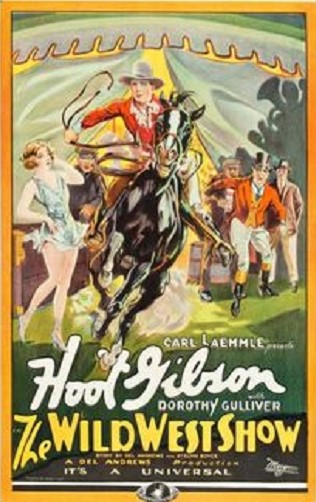
- Directed by: Del Andrews
- Written by: Isadore Bernstein; John B. Clymer
- Based on: "Hey, Rube!" by Del Andrews and St. Elmo Boyce
- Produced by: Carl Laemmle
- Starring: Hoot Gibson
- Cinematography: Harry Neumann
- Edited by: Harry Marker
- Distributed by: Universal Pictures
- Release date: May 20, 1928
- Running time: 6 reels
- Country: United States
- Language: Silent (English intertitles)

The Wild West Show is a 1928 American silent Western film directed by Del Andrews and starring Hoot Gibson. It was produced and distributed through Universal Pictures.

== Plot ==
As described in a film magazine, Rodeo Bill and his cronies vote the small town circus a frost until the horses in the stage coach act bolt and give Bill an opportunity to rescue Ruth Hinson, the circus owner’s daughter, who is the heroine of the act. Ruth tells Bill the circus is in financial straits and that her father wishes her to marry Alexander, his business partner, who has promised to put the show on its feet as soon as she marries him. Bill and his cronies rustle a big crowd from the country-side to see the performance next day when Ruth is to go up in a balloon. Riding to town Bill sees the balloon, which has escaped its moorings, floating away. He dashes to the rescue and secures the dangling rope to his saddle horn. He is disgusted when he discovers he has rescued Zella the cross-eyed knife thrower, who made an accidental ascension. Bill joins the circus as a handy man in order to be near Ruth. He incurs the dislike of Alexander, who plots with his henchmen to steal the gate money and incriminate Bill. Ruth, who discovers Alexander’s plot, tips off Bill and he, with the sheriff, catch Alexander red handed. A ravaging tornado hits the circus, blowing down the main tent as Ruth is doing a trapeze act. Bill manages to rescue her just before the crash. Things look bad for the circus but Ruth and Bill are too absorbed in each other to be disturbed.

== Cast ==
- Hoot Gibson as Rodeo Bill
- Dorothy Gulliver as Ruth Henson
- Allan Forrest as Alexander
- Gale Henry as Zella
- Monte Montague as Bill's Sidekick
- Roy Laidlaw as Joe Henson
- John Hall as Sheriff

== Preservation ==
With no prints of The Wild West Show located in any film archives, it is a lost film.
