= The Decoy (1916 film) =

1916 short film by William Garwood

- Directed by: William Garwood
- Screenplay by: Bess Meredyth (scenario)
- Story by: E. Magnus Ingleton
- Produced by: Carl Laemmle
- Starring: William Garwood; Edward Brady; Lois Wilson; Wadsworth Harris; Jack Connolly; Frank MacQuarrie
- Production company: Independent Moving Pictures Co. of America
- Distributed by: Universal Film Manufacturing Company
- Release date: October 19, 1916 (United States theatrical)
- Country: United States
- Languages: Silent film English intertitles

This is not the 1916 George W. Lederer film by the same name.

The Decoy is a 1916 American black and white silent short drama film directed by William Garwood, and starring William Garwood, Edward Brady, Lois Wilson, Wadsworth Harris, and Frank MacQuarrie. The film premiered October 19, 1916. The film is said to be a story of "revenge and intrigue" with its scenes set in Paris according to the Moving Picture Exhibitors' Association writing about the film in 1916.

== Cast ==
- William Garwood – Raymond Everard
- Edward Brady – Morat
- Lois Wilson – Raymond's Mother
- Wadsworth Harris -Raymond's Father
- Frank MacQuarrie
- Jack Connolly
