= The Heart of a Fool =

1913 film

- Starring: William Garwood
- Distributed by: Mutual Film
- Release date: September 7, 1913
- Country: United States
- Languages: Silent film English intertitles

The Heart of a Fool is a 1913 American silent short drama film starring William Garwood.
