= A Society Sherlock =

1916 film by William Garwood

- Directed by: William Garwood
- Written by: Norbert Lusk (Scenario); Paul West (Story)
- Produced by: Victor Film Company
- Starring: Irma Dawkins; William Garwood
- Distributed by: Universal Film Manufacturing Company
- Release date: August 1, 1916
- Running time: 1 reel
- Country: United States
- Languages: Silent film English intertitles

A Society Sherlock is a 1916 American silent short comedy directed by and starring William Garwood and Irma Dawkins.
