= Her Gallant Knights =

- Starring: William Garwood; Riley Chamberlin; James Cruze; Florence La Badie; Frank Urson
- Distributed by: Mutual Film
- Release date: March 23, 1913
- Country: United States
- Languages: Silent film English intertitles

Her Gallant Knights is a 1913 American silent short romantic comedy film starring William Garwood, Riley Chamberlin, James Cruze, Florence La Badie and Frank Urson.
