= Arthur's Desperate Resolve =

1916 silent short film directed by William Garwood

- Directed by: William Garwood
- Written by: Elliott J. Clawson (Scenario)
- Starring: William Garwood; Edward Brady; Lois Wilson; Alfred Allen
- Distributed by: Universal Film Manufacturing Company
- Release date: September 3, 1916
- Country: United States
- Languages: Silent film English intertitles

Arthur's Desperate Resolve is a 1916 American silent short comedy directed by and starring William Garwood and Edward Brady. Lois Wilson and Alfred Allen also starred.
