= Notorious Gallagher =

1916 film by William Nigh

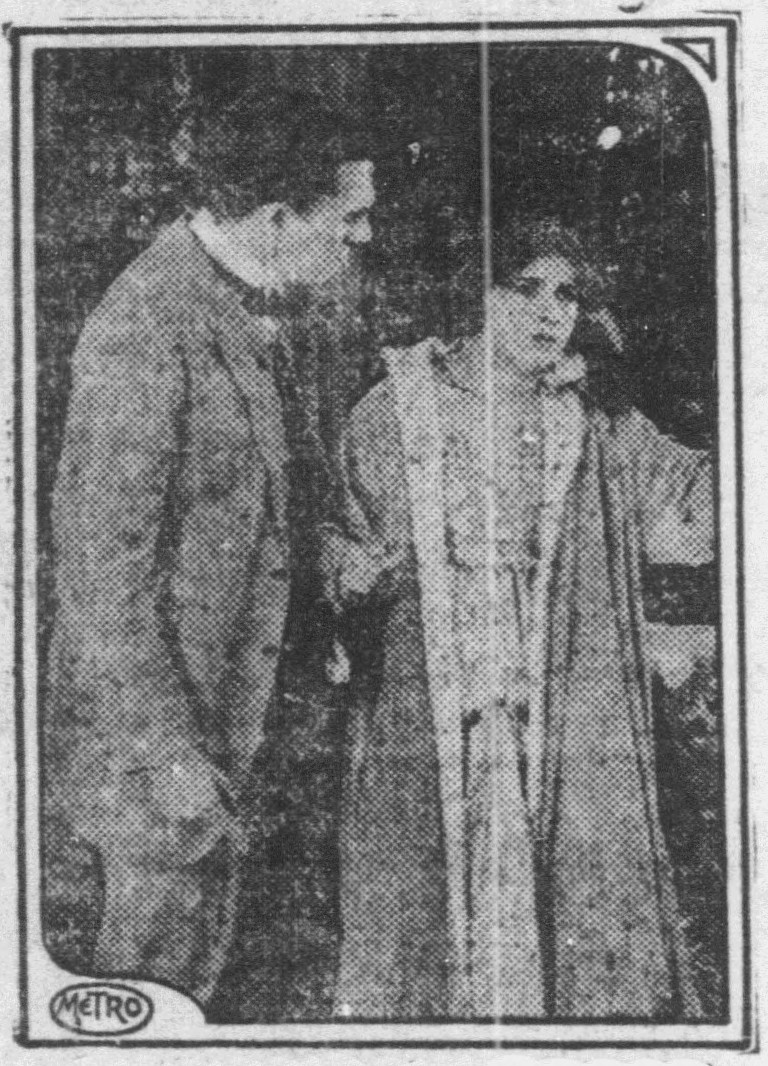
- Publicity image
- Directed by: William Nigh
- Written by: William Nigh
- Produced by: William Nigh
- Starring: William Nigh; Marguerite Snow; Robert Elliott
- Production company: Columbia Pictures
- Distributed by: Metro Pictures
- Release date: May 22, 1916
- Running time: 50 minutes
- Country: United States
- Languages: Silent; English intertitles

Notorious Gallagher is a 1916 American silent drama film directed by William Nigh and starring Nigh, Marguerite Snow and Robert Elliott.

== Cast ==
- William Nigh as Buttsy Gallagher
- Jules Cowles as Michael Gallagher
- Roy Applegate as Judge Winters
- R.A. Bresee as Gus Ewing
- Robert Elliott as Robert Ewing
- Martin Faust as Count Carl
- David Thompson as Detective Cody
- Victor De Linsky as Lefty Jake
- Frank Montgomery as Frank the Mex
- Marguerite Snow as Peggy Winters
- Florence Vincent as Florence Maddern
- Cecelia Griffith as Mrs. Maddern
- Cita Cameron as The Pest
- Mrs. William Nigh as Sloppy Sue

== Bibliography ==
- James Robert Parish & Michael R. Pitts. Film directors: a guide to their American films. Scarecrow Press, 1974.
