= For Her Boy's Sake =

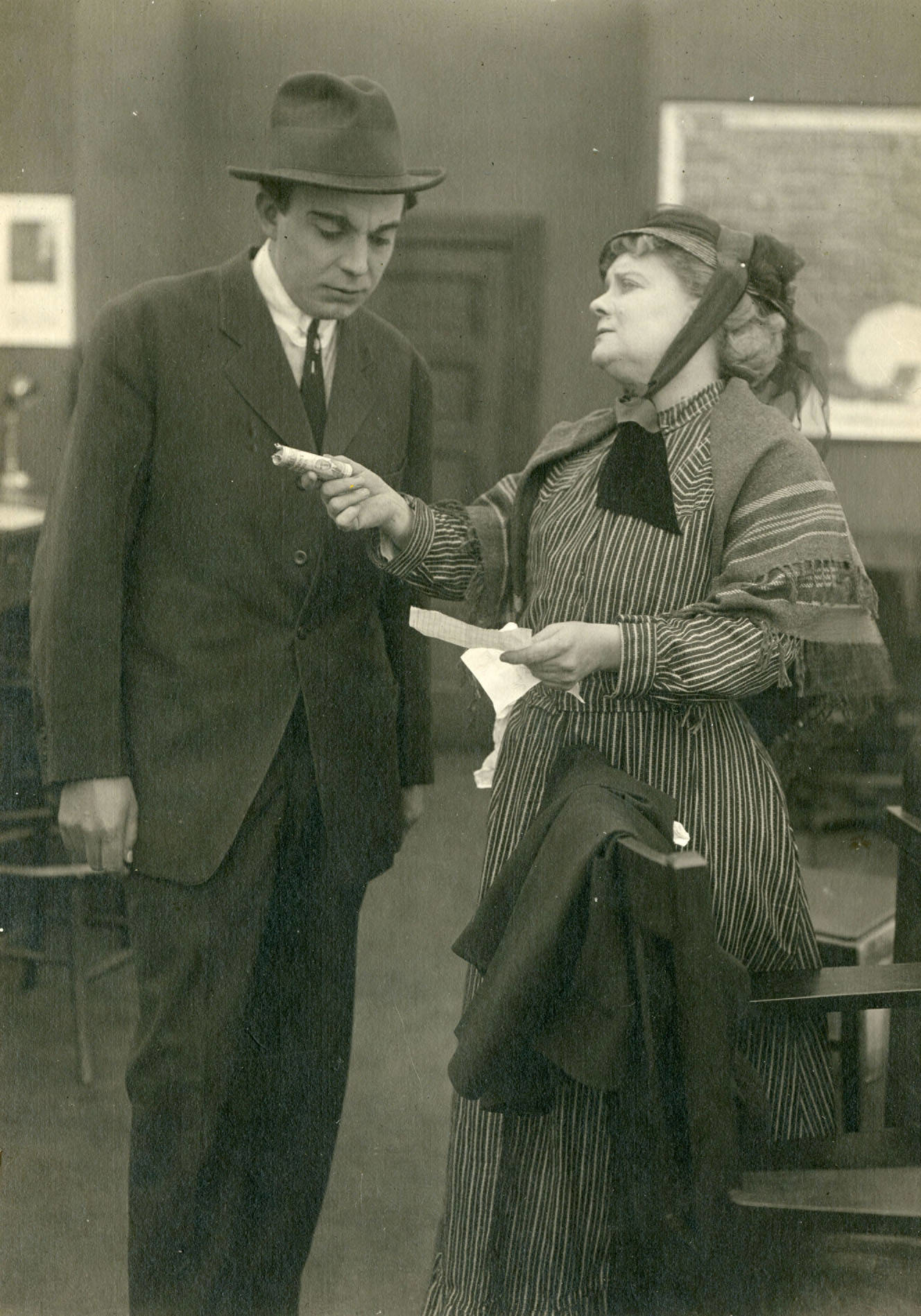
- Starring: William Garwood; Victory Bateman; James Cruze; William Russell; Marguerite Snow
- Distributed by: Mutual Film
- Release date: March 25, 1913
- Country: United States
- Languages: Silent film English intertitles

For Her Boy's Sake is a 1913 American silent short romantic drama starring William Garwood, Victory Bateman, James Cruze, William Russell and Marguerite Snow.

== Plot ==
A widow who was left destitute after her son, her only support, was killed committing a crime gives her life savings to another young man to prevent him from committing a similar crime, but for a better reason.
