= The Evidence of the Film =

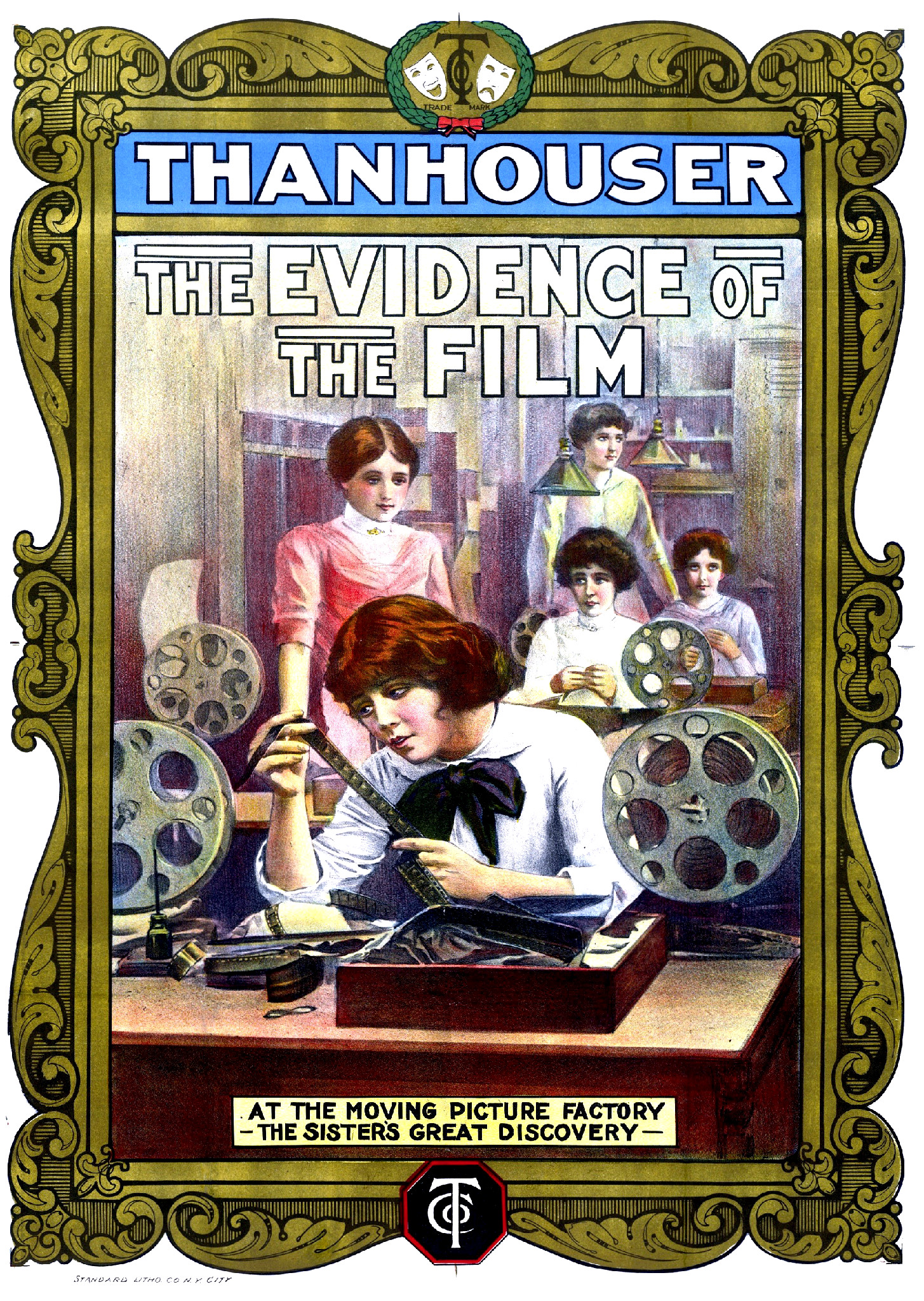
- Film poster
- Directed by: Lawrence Marston; Edwin Thanhouser
- Produced by: Edwin Thanhouser
- Starring: William Garwood; Marie Eline; Florence La Badie; Riley Chamberlin; Helen Badgley
- Production company: Thanhouser Company
- Distributed by: Mutual Film
- Release date: January 10, 1913
- Running time: 15 min.
- Country: United States
- Language: Silent (English intertitles)

The Evidence of the Film is a 1913 American silent short crime film directed by Lawrence Marston and Edwin Thanhouser, starring William Garwood.

The only known copy of this film was rediscovered in 1999 on the floor of the projection booth in a Superior, Montana movie theater. In 2001, this film was selected for preservation in the United States National Film Registry by the Library of Congress as being "culturally, historically, or aesthetically significant".

== Plot ==
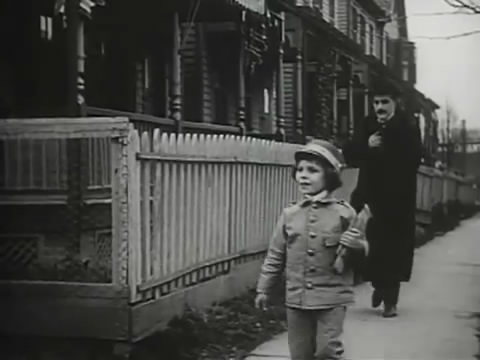
Scene from the film

The Evidence of the Film tells the story of a messenger boy at a film studio who is framed for the theft of $20,000 in bonds by a broker. The broker plans to have his office staff witness him placing the bonds into an envelope and give it to the messenger boy to deliver to his client. Next, the broker follows the boy, knocks him down "by accident," and switches the original envelope with another filled with newspaper scraps. The broker successfully pulls off his scheme, however, his collision with the messenger occurs in front of a film crew shooting a scene on the streets.

When the boy delivers the newspaper-filled envelope to the client, a widow named Mrs. Caroline Livingston calls a policeman to arrest the bewildered boy. He calls his sister for help just before a judge sentences him to time in jail. Fortunately, his sister happens to be a film editor, and she finds the footage the film crew shot of the broker stealing from the boy. The sister delivers the film to the authorities, who arrest the broker and free the messenger boy.

PLAY full film; running time 00:14:37

== Cast ==
- William Garwood as The Broker
- Marie Eline as Messenger Boy
- Riley Chamberlin as Clerk
- Florence La Badie as Sister of Little Boy
- Helen Badgley as Mrs. Caroline Livingstone
