= He Wrote a Book =

1916 short film by William Garwood

- Directed by: William Garwood
- Written by: Hayward Mack (Scenario)
- Starring: William Garwood; Edward Brady; Lois Wilson
- Distributed by: Universal Film Manufacturing Company
- Release date: August 15, 1916
- Running time: 1 reel (approx. 10 minutes)
- Country: United States
- Languages: Silent; English intertitles

He Wrote a Book is a 1916 American silent short comedy directed by and starring William Garwood and Edward Brady. Lois Wilson also starred.
