= On Dangerous Ground (1915 film) =

- Directed by: Lucius Henderson
- Written by: James Dayton (scenario)
- Starring: William Garwood; Violet Mersereau
- Distributed by: Universal Film Manufacturing Company
- Release date: January 18, 1915
- Country: United States
- Languages: Silent film English intertitles

On Dangerous Ground is a 1915 American silent short film directed by Lucius Henderson. William Garwood stars with Violet Mersereau.

== Plot summary ==
The plot involves a faked killing and bank robbery meant to frame a young banker, in order to cover up the villains' embezzlement.

== Cast ==
- William Garwood as the Bank Cashier
- Violet Mersereau as the Banker's Daughter
