= The Buddhist Priestess =

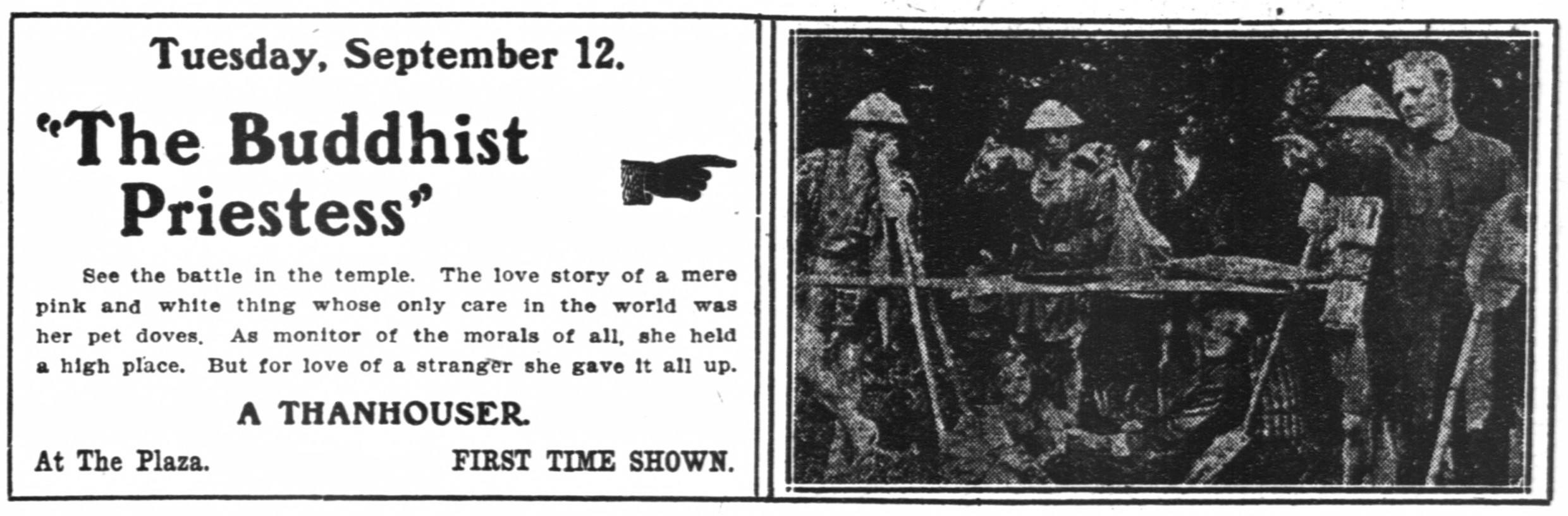
- Newspaper advertisement
- Produced by: Thanhouser Company
- Starring: Marguerite Snow; William Garwood; Marie Eline; Florence La Badie
- Distributed by: Motion Picture Distributors and Sales Company
- Release date: September 12, 1911
- Country: United States
- Languages: Silent film English intertitles

The Buddhist Priestess is a 1911 American silent short romantic drama film. The film starred William Garwood, Marguerite Snow as The Buddhist Priestess, Marie Eline and Florence La Badie.

== Plot ==
The film's story revolves around a young missionary who accepts a foreign post to carry the gospel to Japan. The missionary's wife and young daughter travel to Japan with him where they soon become stricken with the plague. Their local guides, in fear of becoming ill themselves, abandon the missionary and his family in a remote area of countryside. The fleeing guides pass an unguarded Buddhist temple, from which they loot a jeweled idol.

The missionary and his wife soon die of their illness, leaving their young daughter alone in a strange wilderness. She wanders through the countryside on her own, arriving at the same temple shortly after the loss of the idol has been discovered by a Buddhist priest, who has rushed out to summon the locals. The small child enters the temple in search of someone to help her, but finds it deserted. Exhausted, she falls asleep on the pillaged altar. When the Buddhist priest and some locals return, they find the small girl laying on the altar.

They speculate she must be a goddess come to life, bowing down to her and offering her homage. For ten years the little foreigner holds undisputed sway as priestess of the temple. At first she was too young to realize her position, and gradually her old life fades away, and seems but a dream. She could scarcely remember any life save the secluded one she led in the temple when a young American naval officer, whose ship is temporarily anchored in nearby waters, comes upon the temple during a hunting expedition.

He learns he has shot one of the temple's sacred pigeons, which he finds being carefully tended by the beautiful young Buddhist priestess. With this introduction, a friendship, which soon blooms into love, develops between the officer and the priestess. The pigeon which he wounded is trained to carry their love messages from the temple to the ship.

The officer finally prevails upon his newfound love to leave her temple and sail with him back to the land of her people. They are attacked by an indignant band of locals, who refuse to allow their priestess to be taken from them. The priestess and naval officer, now fugitives, take refuge from the angry mob in the temple, from where they dispatch the carrier pigeon to the ship with a message requesting help. A group of navy men receive the message, and reach the temple in time to rescue their officer and his future bride, and they presumably live happily ever after.
