= The Supreme Impulse =

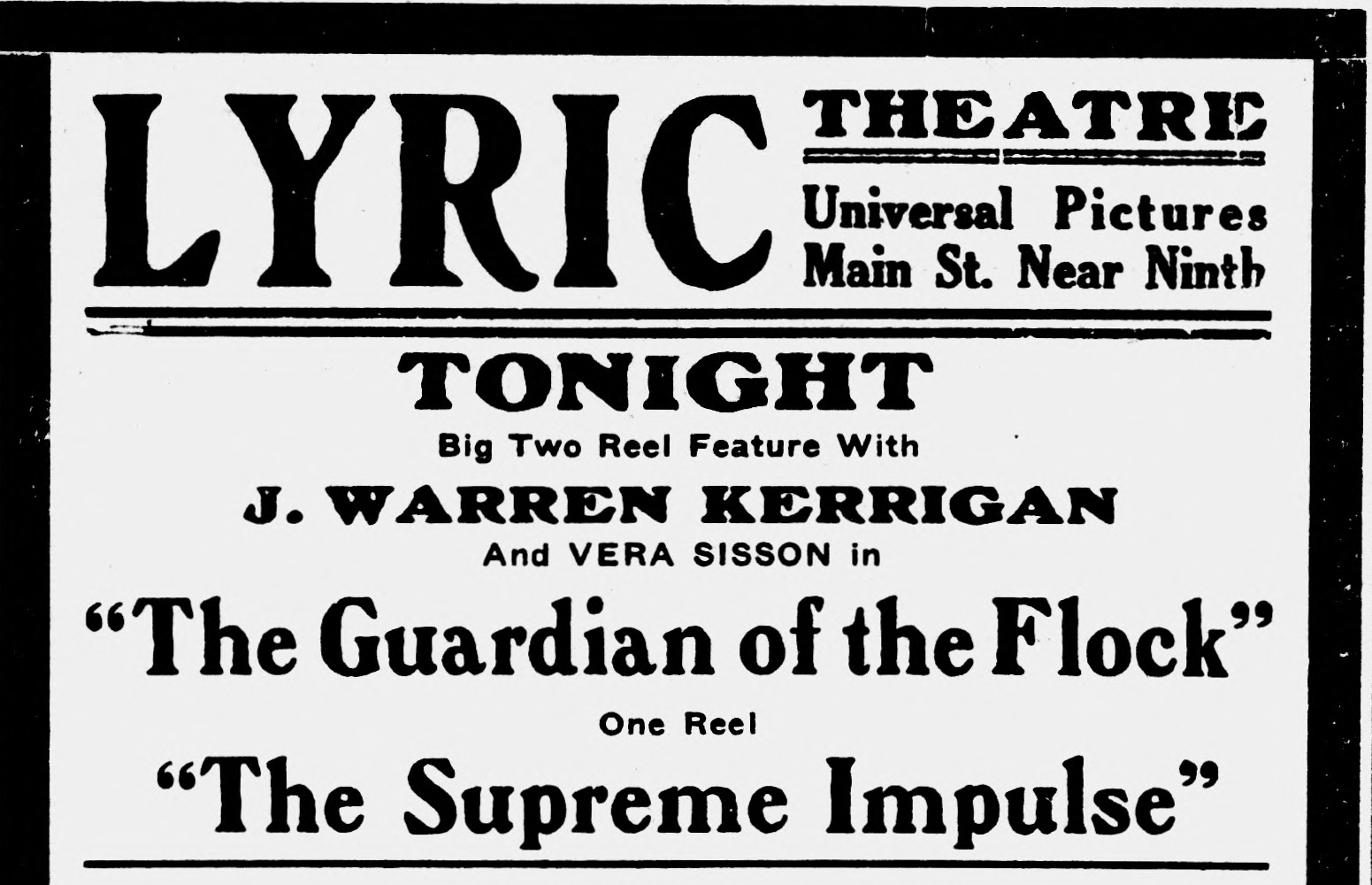
- Contemporary advertisement
- Directed by: Lucius Henderson
- Written by: John B. Clymer
- Starring: William Garwood; Violet Mersereau
- Distributed by: Universal Film Manufacturing Company
- Release date: March 29, 1915
- Country: United States
- Languages: Silent film English intertitles

The Supreme Impulse is a 1915 American silent short film comedy-drama film directed by Lucius Henderson. Starring William Garwood in the lead role with Violet Mersereau.

== Cast ==
- William Garwood as Earl Graham
- Violet Mersereau as Ann Donnelson
