= The Caged Bird =

1913 film

- Starring: William Garwood; Marguerite Snow
- Production company: Thanhouser Company
- Distributed by: Mutual Film
- Release date: June 6, 1913
- Country: United States
- Languages: Silent film English intertitles

The Caged Bird is a 1913 American silent short drama film, produced by the Thanhouser Company, and starring William Garwood and Marguerite Snow.

== Plot ==
A sheltered princess (Snow), facing a negotiated engagement to a prince (Garwood), escapes the formality and ceremony of royal life, only to discover herself ill-prepared for a peasant's rough life. She is assaulted and robbed before she returns to the castle and her wedding.

== Cast ==
- William Garwood as The Prince
- Marguerite Snow as The Princess
- James Cruze as The King
- William Russell as The Farmer
- Emma C. Butler as The Guard of Honor
