= Proxy Husband =

- Directed by: William Garwood
- Written by: J. Grubb Alexander
- Starring: William Garwood; Violet Mersereau; Joseph Granby
- Distributed by: Universal Film Manufacturing Company
- Release date: February 18, 1919
- Country: United States
- Languages: Silent, English intertitles

Proxy Husband is a 1919 American silent short film directed by and starring William Garwood.

== Cast ==
- Violet Mersereau
- William Garwood
- Joseph Granby
- Harry Carter
- Leonora von Ottinger
