= Lois Wilson (actress) =

American actress (1894–1988)

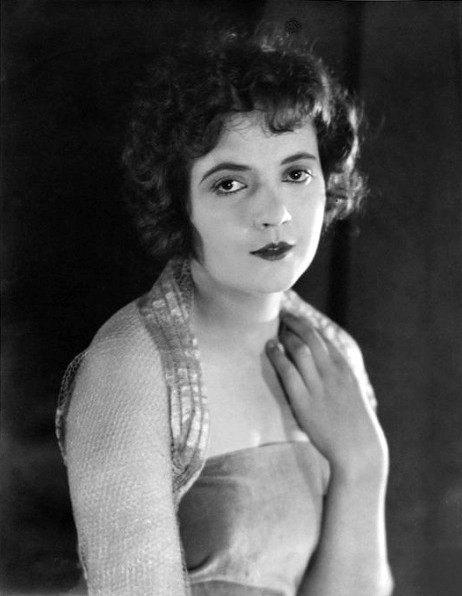
- Wilson in 1920
- Born: June 28, 1894; Pittsburgh, Pennsylvania, U.S.
- Died: March 3, 1988 (aged 93); Reno, Nevada, U.S.
- Resting place: Forest Lawn Memorial Park (Glendale)
- Occupation: Actress
- Years active: 1915–1952

Lois Wilson (June 28, 1894 – March 3, 1988) was an American actress who worked during the silent film era. She also directed two short films and was a scenario writer.

== Early life ==
Born to Andrew Kenley Wilson and Constance (née Coolidge) in Pittsburgh, Pennsylvania, Wilson's family moved to Alabama when she was still very young. She earned a degree from Alabama Normal College (now the University of West Alabama), and became a school teacher for young children, soon leaving to pursue a film career.

In 1915, Wilson moved to California after winning a beauty contest put on by Universal Studios and the Birmingham News. This pageant was the predecessor to the Miss Alabama/Miss America pageant system, and Wilson is considered the first Miss Alabama. Upon arriving in Hollywood, she auditioned and was hired by the Victor Film Company for several small film roles.

In 1916, she visited Chicago, where she met pioneer female film director Lois Weber, who gave her a small part in her film The Dumb Girl of Portici, which starred famed ballerina Anna Pavlova. Weber then took her to Los Angeles, where she was groomed for stardom and began playing leads opposite actors such as J. Warren Kerrigan and Frank Keenan.

== Career ==
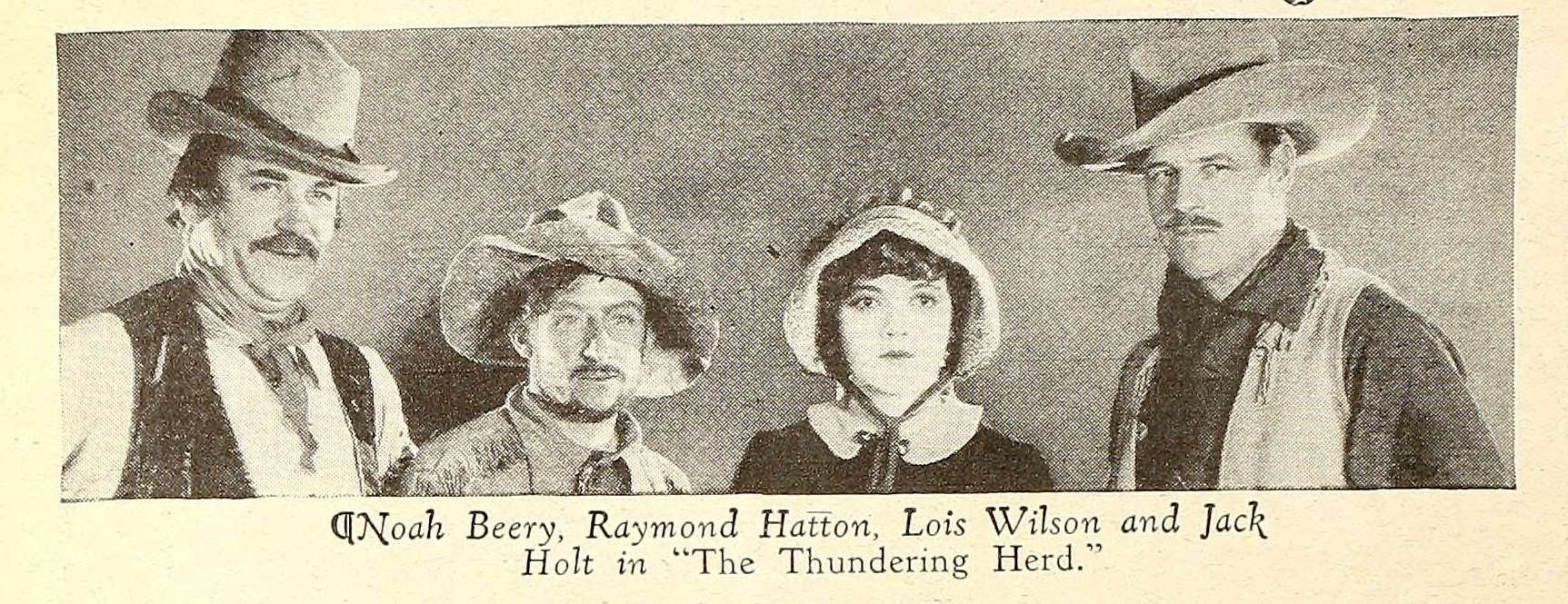
Noah Beery, Raymond Hatton, Lois Wilson and Jack Holt in The Thundering Herd (1925)

After appearing in several films at various studios, Wilson settled in at Paramount Pictures in 1919, where she remained until 1927. She was a WAMPAS Baby Star of 1922, and appeared in 150 movies. Her most recognized screen portrayals are Molly Wingate in The Covered Wagon (1923), in which she was well reviewed, and Daisy Buchanan in the silent film version of The Great Gatsby (1926). She acted opposite male stars such as Rudolph Valentino and John Gilbert.

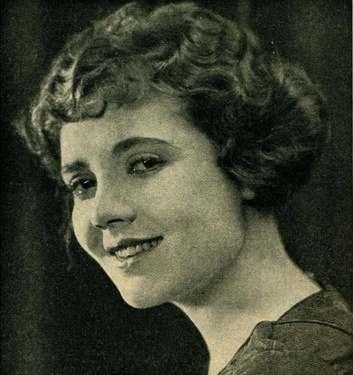
Wilson, Picture-Play Magazine, 1923

Wilson played both romantic leads and character parts. Despite making a successful transition to sound, Wilson was dissatisfied with the roles she received in the 1930s, and she soon retired in 1941, making only three films after 1939. Lois ventured to Broadway and television following her final role in The Girl from Jones Beach (1949) with Ronald Reagan. Wilson played in the network soap operas The Guiding Light in 1951, The Secret Storm and The Edge of Night. She portrayed featured character roles. She made a guest appearance with her old friend Gloria Swanson on the WPIX TV show The Gloria Swanson Hour in 1948.

Wilson was also the model of the official poster for "America Welcomes the World", the Philadelphia Sesquicentennial Celebration, in 1926.

In 1934, her performance in No Greater Glory inspired a Birmingham, Alabama sculptor to create a monument for the city's celebration of World Peace Day.

== Personal life ==
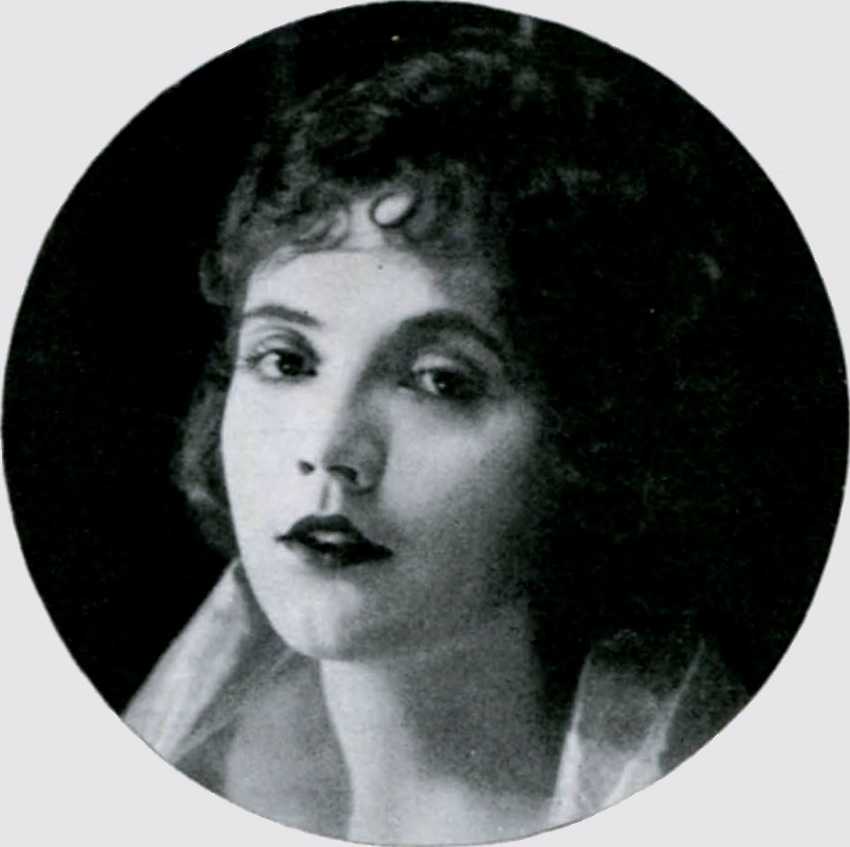
Wilson, 1922

She was once described as having a screen image of "the soft, marrying kind of woman"; in real life, however, she never married. She was chosen by Paramount Pictures to represent the motion picture industry at the British Empire Exposition of 1924. She was described as "a typical example of the American girl in character, culture and beauty". In 1919, Wilson met Gloria Swanson on the set of Cecil B. DeMille's drama, Male and Female. In her 1981 autobiography, Swanson says "Lois had real star quality. Everyone who met her knew it was just a question of time until the right part came along. She never stopped working." They remained close friends.

== Death ==
Lois Wilson died of pneumonia at the Riverside Hospital for Skilled Care in Reno, Nevada at age 93. Her funeral service was conducted at the Church of the Good Shepherd in Beverly Hills, California. She was buried at Forest Lawn Memorial Park in nearby Glendale.

== Filmography ==
The following is a list of films that Lois Wilson either directed, acted in, wrote or produced:

=== Silent films ===
Year	Title	Role	Studio(s) / Distributor(s)	Notes
1915	The Palace of Dust	Beatrix		Short
1915	The New Adventures of Terence O'Rourke	Beatrix		Short
1915	When a Queen Loved O'Rourke	Beatrix		Short
1915	The Road to Paradise	Beatrix		Short
1915	The Hypocrite			Extant
1916	Langdon's Legacy	Pepita	Universal Film Manufacturing Company	Lost
1916	The Dumb Girl of Portici		Universal Film Manufacturing Company	Extant
1916	Married on the Wing	Grace Darling	Universal Film Manufacturing Company	Lost
1916	The Pool of Flame	Princess Beatrix	Universal Film Manufacturing Company	Lost
1916	The Gay Lord Waring	Helen Von Gerold	Bluebird Photoplays	Lost
1916	Hulda the Silent	Hulda Anderson	New York Motion Picture Company	Lost; Short
1916	A Son of the Immortals	Joan Cameron	Bluebird Photoplays	Lost
1916	The Decoy		Mutual Film Corporation	Lost
1916	The Silent Battle	Jane Loring	Universal Film Manufacturing Company	Lost
1916	He Wrote a Book	Jennie	Universal Film Manufacturing Company	Short
1916	The Beckoning Trail	Mary Helton	Universal Film Manufacturing Company	Lost
1916	Arthur's Desperate Resolve	Sibly Grey	Universal Film Manufacturing Company	Short
1916	The White Man's Law		Universal Film Manufacturing Company	
1916	A Soul at Stake	Clementina Fairwood	Universal Film Manufacturing Company	Short
1916	The Decoy	Felese	Universal Film Manufacturing Company	Short
1916	Her Chance	Frances Martin	Universal Film Manufacturing Company	Lost; Short
1916	The Morals of Hilda	Marion	Universal Film Manufacturing Company	Lost
1916	Green Eyes	Julia	Universal Film Manufacturing Company	Short
1917	Alone in the World			Lost; Short; Also wrote and directed
1917	The Whispered Name	Madeline Evers	Universal Film Manufacturing Company	Lost; Short
1917	Black Evidence	Mary	Universal Film Manufacturing Company	Lost; Short
1917	Won by Grit	Teresa	Universal Film Manufacturing Company	Short
1917	Flames of Treachery	Ruth Chalmers	Universal Film Manufacturing Company	Lost; Short
1917	Treason	Floria Natarre	Universal Film Manufacturing Company	Lost
1917	Parentage	Mrs. Melton	Universal Film Manufacturing Company	
1917	Alimony	Marjorie Lansing	First National Pictures	Lost
1918	His Robe of Honor	Laura Nelson	W. W. Hodkinson Corporation	Lost
1918	The Turn of a Card	Cynthia Burdette	W. W. Hodkinson Corporation	Lost
1918	One Dollar Bid	Virginia Dare	W. W. Hodkinson Corporation	Lost
1918	Maid o' the Storm	Elaine Shackleford	W. W. Hodkinson Corporation	Lost
1918	A Burglar for a Night	Janet Leslie	W. W. Hodkinson Corporation	Lost
1918	The Bells	Annette	Pathé Exchange	Lost
1918	Prisoners of the Pines	Rosalie Dufresne	W. W. Hodkinson Corporation	Lost
1918	Three X Gordon	Dorrie Webster	W. W. Hodkinson Corporation	Lost
1918	A Man's Man	Dolores Ruey	W. W. Hodkinson Corporation	Lost
1919	The Drifters	The Girl	Pathé Exchange; W. W. Hodkinson Corporation	Lost
1919	Come Again Smith	Lucy Stevens	Pathé Exchange; W. W. Hodkinson Corporation	Lost
1919	The End of the Game	Mary Miller	Pathé Exchange; W. W. Hodkinson Corporation	Extant. Preserved at the EYE Film Institute Netherlands
1919	Gates of Brass	Margaret Blake	Pathé Exchange	Lost
1919	The Best Man	Celia Hathaway	Pathé Exchange; W. W. Hodkinson Corporation	Lost
1919	A Man's Fight	Mary Tompkins	United Picture Theaters of America	Lost
1919	Love Insurance	Cynthia Meyrick	Famous Players-Lasky	Lost
1919	Why Smith Left Home	Marian	Famous Players-Lasky	An incomplete copy is held at the Library of Congress
1919	The Price Woman Pays	Louise	J. Frank Hatch Enterprises	Lost
1919	It Pays to Advertise	Mary Grayson	Famous Players-Lasky	Lost
1919	Too Much Johnson	Mrs. Billings	Famous Players-Lasky	Lost
1920	Who's Your Servant?	Madeline Bancroft	Robertson-Cole	Lost
1920	Thou Art the Man	Joan Farrant	Famous Players-Lasky	Lost
1920	The City of Masks	Miss Emsdale	Famous Players-Lasky	Lost
1920	What's Your Hurry?	Virginia MacMurran	Famous Players-Lasky	Extant. A copy is held at the Gosfilmofond
1920	A Full House	Ottilie Howell	Famous Players-Lasky	Lost
1920	Burglar Proof	Laura Lowell	Famous Players-Lasky	Lost
1921	Midsummer Madness	Margaret Meredith	Famous Players-Lasky	Extant. A copy is held at the Library of Congress
1921	What Every Woman Knows	Maggie Wylie	Famous Players-Lasky	Lost
1921	The City of Silent Men	Molly Bryant	Famous Players-Lasky	Lost
1921	The Lost Romance	Sylvia Hayes	Famous Players-Lasky	Extant. A copy is held at the Library of Congress
1921	The Hell Diggers	Dora Wade	Famous Players-Lasky	Lost
1921	Miss Lulu Bett	Lulu Bett	Famous Players-Lasky	Extant.
1922	The World's Champion	Lady Elizabeth	Famous Players-Lasky	An incomplete copy is held at the Library of Congress
1922	Is Matrimony a Failure?	Mabel Hoyt	Famous Players-Lasky	Lost
1922	Our Leading Citizen	Katherine Fendle, his fiancée	Famous Players-Lasky	Lost
1922	Manslaughter	Evans - Lydia's Maid	Famous Players-Lasky	Extant. A copy is held at the George Eastman Museum and the Paul Killiam Collection
1922	Without Compromise	Jean Ainsworth	Fox Film Corporation	Lost
1922	Broad Daylight	Nora Fay	Universal Film Manufacturing Company	Lost
1923	The Covered Wagon	Molly Wingate	Famous Players-Lasky	Extant
1923	Bella Donna	Patricia	Famous Players-Lasky	Extant. A copy is held at the Gosfilmofond archive
1923	Only 38	Mrs. Stanley	Famous Players-Lasky	Lost
1923	A Man's Man	Lois Wilson	W. W. Hodkinson Corporation	Lost
1923	To the Last Man	Ellen Jorth	Famous Players-Lasky	Extant. A copy is held at the Gosfilmofond archive
1923	Ruggles of Red Gap	Kate Kenner	Famous Players-Lasky	Lost
1923	The Call of the Canyon	Carley Burch	Famous Players-Lasky	Extant. A copy is held at the Library of Congress
1924	Pied Piper Malone	Patty Thomas	Famous Players-Lasky	Extant. A print is held at the Gosfilmofond archive
1924	Icebound	Jane Crosby	Famous Players-Lasky	Lost
1924	Another Scandal	Beatrice Vanderdyke	W. W. Hodkinson Corporation; Producers Distributing Corporation	Lost
1924	The Man Who Fights Alone	Marion	Famous Players-Lasky	Lost
1924	Monsieur Beaucaire	Queen Marie of France	Famous Players-Lasky	Extant
1924	North of 36	Taisie Lockheart	Famous Players-Lasky	Extant
1925	Contraband	Carmel Lee	Famous Players-Lasky	Lost
1925	The Thundering Herd	Milly Fayre	Famous Players-Lasky	Lost
1925	Welcome Home	Nettie Prouty	Famous Players-Lasky	Extant. Preserved at the Library of Congress
1925	Marry Me		Famous Players-Lasky	Lost; Uncredited
1925	Rugged Water	Norma Bartlett	Famous Players-Lasky	Lost
1925	The Vanishing American	Marion Warner	Famous Players-Lasky	Extant
1925	The King on Main Street	Hotel guest in lobby (cameo appearance) ( uncredited)	Famous Players-Lasky	Extant
1925	Irish Luck	Lady Gwendolyn	Famous Players-Lasky	Extant. A copy is held at the George Eastman Museum
1925	Bluebeard's Seven Wives	Mary Kelly	First National Pictures	Lost
1926	Let's Get Married	Mary Corbin	Famous Players-Lasky	Extant. A copy is held at the Library of Congress
1926	Fascinating Youth	Lois Wilson	Famous Players-Lasky	Lost
1926	The Show-Off	Amy Fisher	Famous Players-Lasky	Extant
1926	The Great Gatsby	Daisy Buchanan	Famous Players-Lasky	Lost
1927	New York	Marjorie Church	Famous Players-Lasky	Lost
1927	Broadway Nights	Fanny Franchette	First National Pictures	Lost
1927	The Gingham Girl	Mary Thompson	Film Booking Offices of America	Extant. A copy is held at the Cinematheque Royale de Belgique
1927	Alias the Lone Wolf	Eve de Montalais	Columbia Pictures	Lost
1927	French Dressing	Cynthia Grey	First National Pictures	Lost
1928	Coney Island	Joan Wellman	Film Booking Offices of America	Lost
1928	Miss Information	The Public Stenographer		Lost
1928	Ransom	Lois Brewster	Columbia Pictures	Lost
1928	Sally's Shoulders	Sally	Film Booking Offices of America	Lost

=== Sound films ===
Release date	Title	Role	Studio(s) / Distributor(s)	Notes
1928	On Trial	May Strickland	Warner Bros.	Lost. Trailer and soundtrack survives.
1928	Object: Alimony	Ruth Rutledge	Columbia Pictures	Lost
1928	Conquest	Diane Holden		Lost
1929	A Bird in the Hand	The Wife		Incomplete
1929	Kid Gloves	Ruth		Lost
1929	The Gamblers	Catherine Darwin	Warner Bros.	Lost
1929	Her Husband's Women	The Painter's Jealous Wife		Short
1929	The Show of Shows	Performer in 'Bicycle Built for Two' Number	Warner Bros.	Extant
1929	Wedding Rings	Cornelia Quinn	Warner Bros.	Lost
1930	For Love or Money			Extant; Short
1930	The Furies	Fifi Sands	First National Pictures	Lost
1930	Lovin' the Ladies	Joan Bently	RKO Radio Pictures	Extant
1930	Temptation	Julie		Extant
1930	Once a Gentleman	Mrs. Mallin	Sono Art-World Wide Pictures	Lost
1931	Seed	Peggy Carter	Universal Pictures	Extant
1931	The Age for Love	Sylvia Pearson	United Artists	Lost
1932	The Expert	Nettie Minick	Warner Bros.	Extant
1932	The Rider of Death Valley	Helen Joyce	Universal Pictures	Extant
1932	Drifting Souls	Linda Lawrence	Capitol Film Exchange	Extant
1932	Divorce in the Family	Mrs. Shumaker	Metro-Goldwyn-Mayer	
1932	The Crash	Marcia Peterson	Warner Bros.	
1932	The Devil Is Driving	Nancy Evans	Paramount Pictures	
1932	The Secrets of Wu Sin	Nona Gould	Chesterfield Pictures	
1932	Law and Order		Universal Pictures	
1933	Obey the Law	Grace Chester	Columbia Pictures	
1933	Laughing at Life	Mrs. McHale	Mascot Pictures	
1933	Deluge	Helen Webster	RKO Radio Pictures	
1933	In the Money	Mary 'Lambie' Higginbottom	Chesterfield Pictures	
1933	Female	Harriet	Warner Bros.	
1934	The Show-Off	Clara Harling	Metro-Goldwyn-Mayer	
1934	No Greater Glory	Nemeecsek's Mother	Columbia Pictures	
1934	School for Girls	Miss Cartwright	Liberty Pictures	
1934	There's Always Tomorrow	Sophie White	Universal Pictures	
1934	Ticket to a Crime	Elaine Purdy	Beacon Productions	
1934	Bright Eyes	Mary Blake	Fox Film	
1935	Life Returns	Dr. Louise Stone	Universal Pictures	
1935	Public Opinion	Mona Trevor / Anne Trevor	Chesterfield Pictures	
1935	Society Fever	Portia Prouty	Chesterfield Pictures	
1935	Born to Gamble	Paula Mathews	Republic Pictures	
1935	Cappy Ricks Returns	Florry Peasley	Republic Pictures	
1935	Your Uncle Dudley	Christine Saunders	20th Century Fox	
1936	The Return of Jimmy Valentine	Mary Davis	Republic Pictures	
1936	Wedding Present	Laura Dodacker	Paramount Pictures	
1936	Laughing at Trouble	Alice Mathews	20th Century Fox	
1939	Bad Little Angel	Mrs. Ellen Creighton	Metro-Goldwyn-Mayer	
1940	Nobody's Children	Miss Jamieson	Columbia Pictures	
1941	For Beauty's Sake	Mrs. Lloyd Kennar	20th Century Fox	
1949	The Girl from Jones Beach	Mrs. Wilson	Warner Bros.	
