= A Six Cylinder Elopement =

- Written by: Lloyd Lonergan
- Produced by: Thanhouser Company
- Starring: William Garwood; Riley Chamberlain; Marguerite Snow
- Distributed by: Film Supply Company
- Release date: October 6, 1912
- Running time: 1 reel (approximately ten minutes)
- Country: United States
- Languages: Silent film English intertitles

A Six Cylinder Elopement is a 1912 American silent short romantic comedy written by Lloyd Lonergan. The film starred William Garwood, Riley Chamberlain and Marguerite Snow.

== Cast ==
- Riley Chamberlain as Ex-Congressman Gray, The Girl's Father
- Marguerite Snow as Gray's Daughter
- William Garwood as John Henderson, Gray's Daughter's Sweetheart
