= The Railroad Builder =

- Produced by: Thanhouser Company
- Starring: William Garwood; Marguerite Snow; William Russell
- Distributed by: Motion Picture Distributors and Sales Company
- Release date: May 9, 1911
- Country: United States
- Languages: Silent film English intertitles

The Railroad Builder is a 1911 American silent short drama film. The film starred William Garwood, Marguerite Snow and William Russell.

== Plot ==
An elderly man attempts to prevent a railway from being built across his family property but loses his legal case. His daughter appeals to the railway president, who rejects her request. A local farmer who loves her rallies neighboring farmers to sabotage the construction site, setting fire to railway supplies and detaining the engineer. Alarmed by their actions, the daughter rides to a nearby town to summon firefighters, saving the engineer and the site. Grateful for her help, the engineer wins her affection, while she persuades her father to accept the railway's construction.
