= Conductor 786 =

- Produced by: Thanhouser Company
- Starring: William Garwood; Riley Chamberlin; Jean Darnell
- Distributed by: Film Supply Company
- Release date: August 23, 1912
- Country: United States
- Languages: Silent film English intertitles

Conductor 786 is a 1912 American silent short comedy film starring William Garwood, Riley Chamberlin, Jean Darnell.

== Cast ==
- Riley Chamberlin as Conductor 786
- William Garwood as The Conductor's Son
- Jean Darnell as The Conductor's Son's Wife
- William B. Wheeler as Superintendent William B. Wheeler
