= With the Mounted Police =

- Written by: Lloyd Lonergan
- Starring: William Garwood; Mignon Anderson; Justus D. Barnes
- Production company: Thanhouser Company
- Distributed by: Mutual Film
- Release date: December 31, 1912
- Country: United States
- Languages: Silent; English intertitles

With the Mounted Police is a 1912 American silent short romantic thriller film written by Lloyd Lonergan. The films stars William Garwood as a Mounted Police Officer and Mignon Anderson his sweetheart. Notes one historian, "she was famed for doing her own stunt work. Among her cinematic feats was a daring rescue filmed on the Bronx River when... she leapt into the water to rescue her hapless beau, who had gotten himself bound and gagged and tossed into the river by the bad guys."

== Plot ==
This plot summary is taken from The Moving Picture World for December 28, 1912.

WITH THE MOUNTED POLICE (Dec. 31)—The mounted police had many duties to perform, and continual vigilance was the price of order, owing to the fact that many dangerous aliens were in the territory they guarded.

On one occasion the captain receives an anonymous warning that the men in a certain section of the works were planning violence because certain concessions they demanded had been refused. The captain called upon one of his brightest young men to find out if there was any truth in the statement. The patrolman disguised himself, secured work as a laborer and soon became on friendly and confidential terms with his associates. He learned that the warning was true, and communicated with his captain by phone, and agreed to meet a party of police that night at a certain spot in the road and lead them to the conspirators.

One of the criminals, however, was suspicious, and had secretly trailed the patrolman, learning that he was a spy. That evening a number of the men attacked the detective while he was walking along the road, overpowered, bound and gagged him, and then threw him into a newly completed reservoir which was empty. They then turned on the water, insuring a slow but certain death.

Before the young man started out on his detective work, he had taken his best dog and left him to his sweetheart, a country girl who lived near the aqueduct. On the night he was overpowered, the dog ran away from his new mistress, being lonesome without his master. Along the rough roads and through the woods he traced his owner, finally locating him in the slowly filling aqueduct.

The girl was in the cottage when the dog returned, and the animal's excitement led her to believe that something was wrong. She followed the dog, and he led her to the aqueduct where she arrived just in time to save the policeman's life.

The bluecoat, although unstrung by his terrible experience, was in time to meet the detachment of his comrades, and guide them to where the conspirators were. The dangerous gang were placed behind the bars, and the girl whose bravery saved a life later became the bride of the policeman.
