= Wild Blood (1915 film) =

- Directed by: William Garwood
- Written by: Joseph Gollomb
- Starring: William Garwood
- Distributed by: Universal Film Manufacturing Company
- Release date: April 19, 1915
- Country: United States
- Languages: Silent film English intertitles

Wild Blood is a 1915 American silent short drama film directed by and starring William Garwood in the lead role with Violet Mersereau.

It was produced by the Independent Moving Pictures Company of America.

== Cast ==
- Violet Mersereau as Bess Browne - Mountain Girl
- William Garwood as Walt Hiller
