= Cally's Comet =

- Written by: Lloyd Lonergan
- Produced by: Thanhouser Company
- Starring: William Garwood
- Distributed by: Motion Picture Distributors and Sales Company
- Release date: April 18, 1911
- Running time: 1 reel
- Country: United States
- Languages: Silent film English intertitles

Cally's Comet is a short silent American drama film released on April 18, 1911. It featured William Garwood, a respected actor at the time. The film was produced by the Thanhouser Company and released in black and white.

== Synopsis ==
May Deering is the daughter of Professor Deering, a celebrated astronomer who is more interested in stargazing than he is in his daughter's love life. Her sweetheart, Jack Webster disguises himself as an elderly astronomer so that he can sneak into the residence to see the girl of his dreams. Jack introduces himself to the professor as "Graf Heinrich von Twiller, A.M.B.C., Professor of Astronomy, University of Bauergarten." Prof. Deering, excited to meet a fellow colleague, invites the young man to look through his telescope.

Jack pretends to see something very unusual and pulls Prof. Deering over to the instrument. As the professor searches in vain to see the "unique discovery", Jack gets to kiss May. When the professor leaves Jack and May for a moment, Jack paints the design of a comet on the telescope's lens, causing the old professor to jump for joy when he returns and spies it. While the old scientist makes a fool of himself by inviting some learned colleagues over to look at "the comet", Jack divests himself of his disguise, and has already erased the drawing of the comet from the lens.

Prof. Deering faints when he finds that the comet has disappeared. Jack makes a deal with the professor, telling him that he will make the comet reappear and save him from embarrassment at the hands of his fellow scientists if the professor will consent to May's marrying him. The Professor agrees, and the two sweethearts are united in marriage.

== Reviews ==
A 1911 review in Billboard described the film as having “very good acting” but little in the way of surprises or suspense.
