= Courting Across the Court =

- Produced by: Thanhouser Company
- Starring: William Garwood
- Distributed by: Motion Picture Distributors and Sales Company
- Release date: June 27, 1911
- Country: United States
- Languages: Silent film English

Courting Across the Court is a 1911 American silent short romantic comedy film. The film stars William Garwood.
