= Baseball and Bloomers =

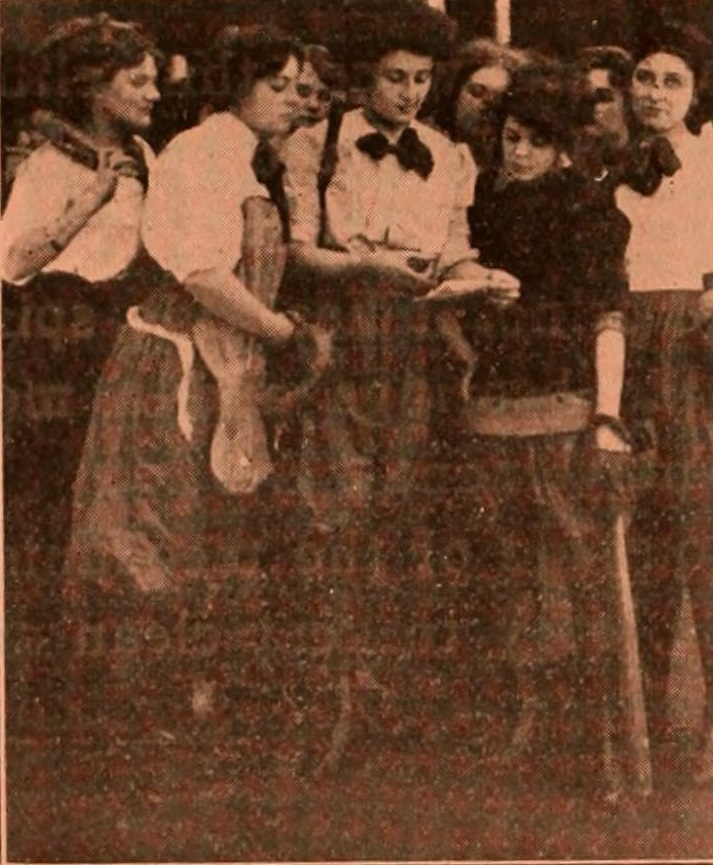
- Film still showing the Miss Street's Seminary for Girls team
- Starring: William Garwood; Marguerite Snow
- Distributed by: Motion Picture Distributors and Sales Company
- Release date: January 6, 1911
- Running time: 1 reel
- Country: United States
- Languages: Silent; English intertitles

Baseball and Bloomers, also known as Baseball in Bloomers, is a 1911 American silent short sports film produced by the Thanhouser Company. The film stars William Garwood and is the debut of Marguerite Snow. The film focuses on a female seminary which organizes a baseball club and challenges another school to a game. The boys accept to the game with amusement and find that the women are not good at baseball. Two Harvard University baseball stars join the ranks of the girls in disguise and defeat the boys team. The script may have been written by Lloyd Lonergan and the film may have been directed by Barry O'Neil or Lucius J. Henderson. The film was released on January 6, 1911 and it received positive reviews. The film is presumed lost.

== Plot ==
Though the film is presumed lost, a synopsis survives in The Moving Picture World from January 7, 1911. It states, "Miss Street's Seminary for Girls has a very ambitious class of pupils. The young athletes, not content with basketball and tennis, aspire to shine in the great American game, and organize a baseball club. They are so satisfied with themselves that they finally send a challenge to Adair College, which has a crowd of husky young athletes in a club that thinks it amounts to something. When the challenge is received, the boys are first angry, then amused. They decide to accept it, to have fun with the girls. The young women, after some practice, realize that their team, while it may be pretty to look at, is of little real use on the diamond. And the prospect makes them weep. Fortunately for the girls, Jack, the brother of the president, arrives from Harvard. His chum, Jim, is with him. These two young men are baseball stars themselves, and when they are told of the predicament of the girls, they goodnaturedly offer to help them out. The university men disguise themselves as girls, act as battery for the young women, and the college boys, who had looked for a laughable victory, are mowed down, inning after inning, because of the work of pitcher Jack and catcher Jim. The other members of the 'girl' team have nothing to do except look pretty. When the boy athletes have retired from the field vanquished, the girls reward their battery with one kiss - only one - from each of the other seven players."

== Cast ==
- William Garwood
- Marguerite Snow

== Production ==
The writer of the scenario was most likely Lloyd Lonergan. He was an experienced newspaperman employed by The New York Evening World while writing scripts for the Thanhouser productions. The film director may have been Barry O'Neil or Lucius J. Henderson. The role of the cameraman was uncredited in 1910 productions though cameramen employed by the company during this era included Blair Smith, Alfred H. Moses, Jr. and Carl Louis Gregory. The other cast credits are unknown, but many Thanhouser productions are fragmentary. In late 1910, the Thanhouser company released a list of the important personalities in their films. The list includes G.W. Abbe, Justus D. Barnes, Frank H. Crane, Irene Crane, Marie Eline, Violet Heming, Martin J. Faust, Thomas Fortune, George Middleton, Grace Moore, John W. Noble, Anna Rosemond, and Mrs. George Walters.

This film is important for being the debut of Marguerite Snow, who would become one of the most important actresses for the company. In an interview by Johnson Briscoe, Snow said that her career as an actress was an accidental one. A girl friend of hers suggested she come to the studio to see how motion pictures are made. There at the studio, Edwin Thanhouser asked her if she wanted to be in the film. Snow accepted and she took part in the production until the director asked them to go outside to shoot another scene. Snow then protested about going outside in such a costume and in winter and proceeded home. A week later she received a phone call and ended up working for six more months before temporarily returning to the stage. Another baseball related film would be released later that year by the Thanhouser Company, The Baseball Bug.

== Release and reception ==
The single reel comedy, approximately 1,000 feet long, was released on January 6, 1911. The film had a wide national release; advertising theaters are known in Indiana, North Carolina, South Dakota, Iowa, Pennsylvania, and Texas. In Arizona, the film would be advertised by one theatre as Baseball Bloomers and it appears to also have been the case in another Kansas theater. The film would also be shown in Hawaii in August 1912.

The New York Dramatic Mirror gave a brief summary and review of the film and gave minor praise for the production. The reviewer wrote, "The details of this comedy are well worked out, and it is good for a portion of genuine laughs. The girls of Miss Street's Seminary become so elated over their success in the gymnasium that they feel impelled to branch out, and accordingly they challenge the boys of Adair College to a game of ball. At the last moment the girls feel like backing out, when two of Cornell's star baseball players arrive in town. They agree to pitch and catch for the girls, who give them bloomers and rats from their hair for disguise. At the eighth inning the score was 0 to 0. By the ninth it was 0 to 2, in favor of Miss Street's Seminary for Girls. The nine girls then showed their gratitude by giving the pitcher and catcher a round of kisses, while the Adair College boys stood off at a respectful distance. The actors were equal to the occasion." The Billboard affirmed by stating, "Thanhouser producers have again placed a picture of originality on the market in Baseball and Bloomers. It is a farce pure and simple, but it offers many laughable situations. The acting is generally good, but in a few instances scenes were overacted."

== See also ==
- List of baseball films
- Women in baseball
