= Put Yourself in His Place =

- Directed by: Theodore Marston
- Written by: Theodore Marston
- Starring: William Garwood; Marguerite Snow
- Distributed by: Thanhouser Film Corporation
- Release date: October 29, 1912
- Running time: 2 reels
- Country: United States
- Languages: Silent film English intertitles

Put Yourself in His Place is a 1912 American silent short drama based on an 1870 English novel by Charles Reade. The film was adapted and directed by Theodore Marston, and stars William Garwood and Marguerite Snow in the lead roles.

== Plot ==
The story is of an English manufacturing town ("Hillsborough", based on Sheffield) in which Henry Little, a worker and inventor, is persecuted by trade unions, jealous because he was better trained than his fellows. Squire Raby, Little's uncle, is a forcible character, and a pleasant love story offsets the labor troubles. A purpose of the novel was to expose, without censure, the errors of early trades unions.

== Cast ==
- William Garwood as Henry Little
- Marguerite Snow as Grace Carden
- William Russell as Squire Raby
- Jean Darnell as Edith Raby, the Squire's Sister
- James Cruze as Edith's Husband
- David H. Thompson as Coventry
- Anne Drew as Jael Dence
- Marie Eline
