= Won by Wireless =

- Produced by: Thanhouser Company
- Starring: William Garwood
- Distributed by: Motion Picture Distributors and Sales Company
- Release date: July 14, 1911
- Country: United States
- Languages: Silent film English intertitles

Won by Wireless is a 1911 American silent short film. The film stars William Garwood.
