= At the Foot of the Ladder =

- Written by: Lloyd Lonergan
- Produced by: Thanhouser Company
- Starring: Mignon Anderson; William Garwood; Carey L. Hastings; Harry Chamberlain; Riley Chamberlain
- Distributed by: Motion Picture Distributors and Sales Company
- Release date: September 22, 1912
- Country: United States
- Languages: Silent film English intertitles

At the Foot of the Ladder is a 1912 American silent short romantic comedy written by Lloyd Lonergan. The film starred Mignon Anderson, William Garwood, Carey L. Hastings, Harry Chamberlain, and Riley Chamberlain.

== Cast ==
- Mignon Anderson as The Debutante
- William Garwood as The Society Leader
- Carey L. Hastings as The Debutante's Mother
- Riley Chamberlain as The Debutante's Father
- Harry Chamberlain as The Reporter
