= Petticoat Camp =

- Produced by: Thanhouser Company
- Starring: William Garwood; Florence La Badie
- Distributed by: Film Supply Company
- Release date: November 3, 1912
- Country: United States
- Languages: Silent film English intertitles

Petticoat Camp

Petticoat Camp is a 1912 American silent short comedy film starring William Garwood and Florence La Badie.

== Plot ==
Only lasting 15 minutes, it is a light-hearted comedy about the battle between the sexes as several married couples go on a camp-out together. The women soon realize that the men expect them to do perform all of the work while they relax, leading to several comedic situations.
