= Please Help the Pore =

- Written by: Lloyd Lonergan
- Produced by: Thanhouser Company
- Starring: William Garwood; Riley Chamberlin; Mignon Anderson; Marie Eline
- Distributed by: Film Supply Company
- Release date: September 29, 1912
- Running time: 1 reel
- Country: United States
- Languages: Silent film English intertitles

Please Help the Pore (also known as Please Help the Poor) is a 1912 American silent short drama starring William Garwood, Riley Chamberlin, Mignon Anderson, and Marie Eline.
