= The Pasha's Daughter =

1911 film by the Thanhouser Company

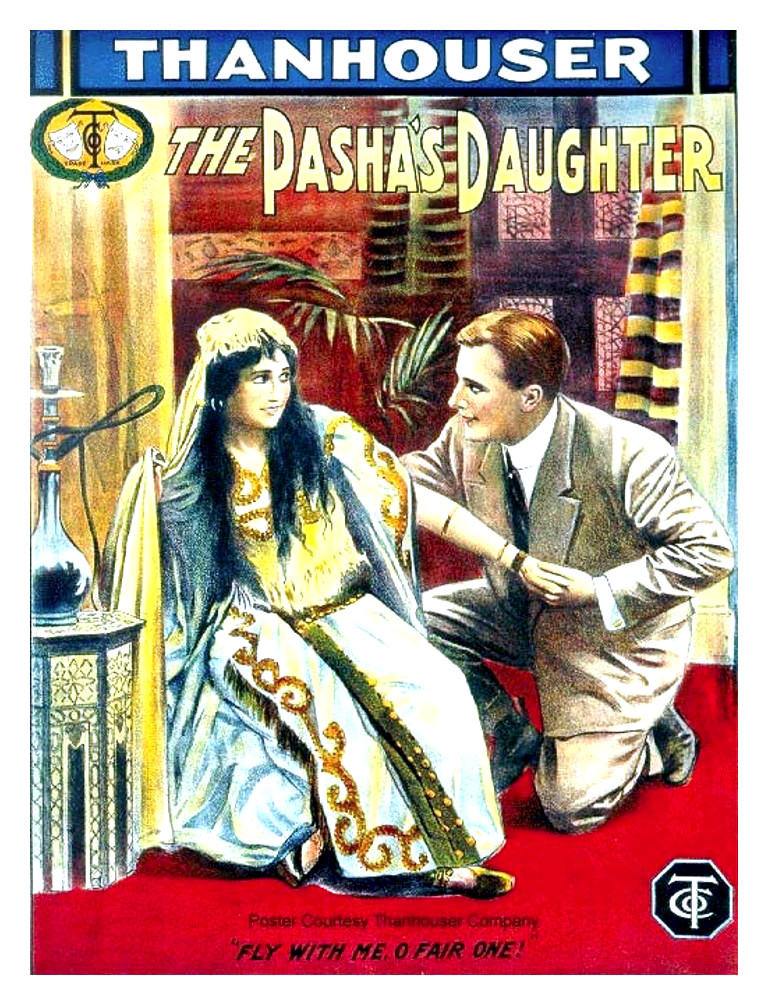
- Film poster
- Produced by: Thanhouser Company
- Starring: William Garwood
- Distributed by: Motion Picture Distributors and Sales Company
- Release date: January 3, 1911
- Running time: 13 minutes, 30 seconds
- Country: United States
- Languages: Silent film English intertitles

The Pasha's Daughter is a 1911 American silent short drama produced by the Thanhouser Company. The film based on a true story. The film focuses on an American named Jack who is traveling in Turkey. He befriends an aged Turk and is arrested as a conspirator against the government. His first attempt to flee the jail failed, but the second succeeds. Jack flees into the courtyard of the Pasha and is hidden from the guards by the Pasha's daughter. Disguised as a woman, Jack makes his escape with her aid, but she refuses his offer to flee with him. A year later, the Pasha's daughter is ushered in and announces that she wants to be his bride.

The only known cast credits are for William Garwood and William Russell and the production credits are unknown. The film was released on January 3, 1911, and was met with positive reviews. The film survives in the Museum of Modern Art and it has been released on DVD as part of the Thanhouser Collection.

== Plot ==
The Pasha's Daughter (1911)

The film begins with Jack Sparks, a young American, who is traveling in Turkey. He befriends an aged Turk during a carriage ride and the Turk invites Jack into his home. The man smokes from a hookah and several of other men arrive and speak with the Turk whilst Jack wanders about the house. Soon afterwards, the men are all arrested for conspiracy against the government and Jack is imprisoned as one of the conspirators. In jail, Jack tries to make his escape and throws the guard to the ground, no sooner has he left the cell is he forced back by two more guards. He struggles in vain, but is once again locked in his cell. Jack gets an idea to escape when he sees the bed sheet and the cell window. Using his pocket knife, he digs out the bar of the cell window and drops to freedom. He struggles and overpowers a guard before climbing over the wall and into the courtyard of the Pasha's palace.

The Pasha's daughter, Murana, finds him hiding and orders her servant to assist in Jack's escape. Guards appear and announce that they are looking for the escaped prisoner, but they are turned away. Dressed up as a woman, Jack tries to have Murana flee with him. She says that she cannot marry him now, but she may come to his country one day. Jack trades a flower for his business card and departs. A year later, Jack and his mother have a visitor ushered and they stand in confusion at the beautiful young woman. Jack does not recognize her until she covers her face with her veil and she announces her intention to be his bride.

== Cast ==
- William Garwood as Jack Sparks
- William Russell

== Production ==
The writer of the scenario is unknown, but it was most likely Lloyd Lonergan. He was an experienced newspaperman employed by The New York Evening World while writing scripts for the Thanhouser productions. The film director is unknown, but it may have been Barry O'Neil or Lucius J. Henderson. Cameramen employed by the company during this era included Blair Smith, Carl Louis Gregory, and Alfred H. Moses, Jr. though none are specifically credited. The role of the cameraman was uncredited in 1910 productions. The other cast credits are unknown, but many Thanhouser productions are fragmentary. In late 1910, the Thanhouser company released a list of the important personalities in their films. The list includes G.W. Abbe, Justus D. Barnes, Frank H. Crane, Irene Crane, Marie Eline, Violet Heming, Martin J. Faust, Thomas Fortune, George Middleton, Grace Moore, John W. Noble, Anna Rosemond, Mrs. George Walters.

== Release and reception ==
The single reel drama, approximately 1,000 feet long, was released on January 3, 1911. The film had a wide national release, advertising theaters include those in Indiana, Kansas, Utah, Wisconsin, North Carolina, South Dakota, Pennsylvania, New Hampshire, Illinois, Missouri, and Ohio. The Billboard reviewed the film and offered praise for the production, "This picture presents a story that is decidedly original and away from beaten paths. The settings in Turkey are elaborate and faithful to Turkish customs. All the players portray their respective parts in an excellent manner. The photography is very good." The New York Dramatic Mirror provided a summary of the film and concluded that the film "was well enacted and the sets were fully adequate, creating a fair illusion of the Oriental land depicted." The Moving Picture World was also provided a positive review, stating "The scenic effects are interesting and the story is lively enough to keep the audience wondering what the end will be." One advertisement for the film erroneously claimed that the film was shot in the Orient, unaware that the film was shot in Thanhouser's studio.

A print of the film survives in the archives of the Museum of Modern Art. The complete film as intended for its release is 13 minutes and 39 seconds long. As the original film did not have official musical accompaniment, a new original music score was composed and performed by Ben Model. The film was exhibited by The Museum of Modern Art on October 29, 2009, it was organized by Charles Silver and film historians Ben Model and Steve Massa. The film was released in Volume 10 of the Thanhouser Collection.
