= The Thunderbolt (1912 film) =

- Produced by: Thanhouser Company
- Starring: William Garwood; James Cruze; David Thompson; Jean Darnell; Mignon Anderson
- Distributed by: Film Supply Company
- Release date: November 26, 1912
- Country: United States
- Languages: Silent film English intertitles

The Thunderbolt is a 1912 American silent, black-and-white short drama starring William Garwood, James Cruze, David Thompson, Jean Darnell, and Mignon Anderson.

== Plot ==
The Thunderbolt (1912)

== Cast ==
- James Cruze as the dishonest broker
- Mignon Anderson as the broker's daughter, as an adult
- David Thompson as the poor man
- Jean Darnell the poor man's wife
- William Garwood as the poor couple's son, as an adult
