= Flames and Fortune =

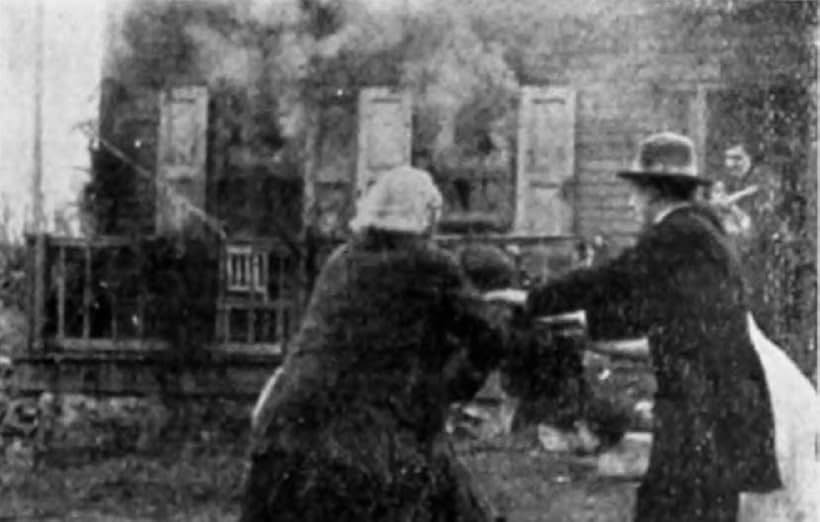
- Film still
- Produced by: Thanhouser Company
- Starring: William Garwood; Marie Eline
- Distributed by: Motion Picture Distributors and Sales Company
- Release date: June 16, 1911
- Country: United States
- Languages: Silent film English intertitles

Flames and Fortune is a 1911 American silent short drama film produced by the Thanhouser Company. The film starred William Garwood and Marie Eline.
