= The Colonel and the King =

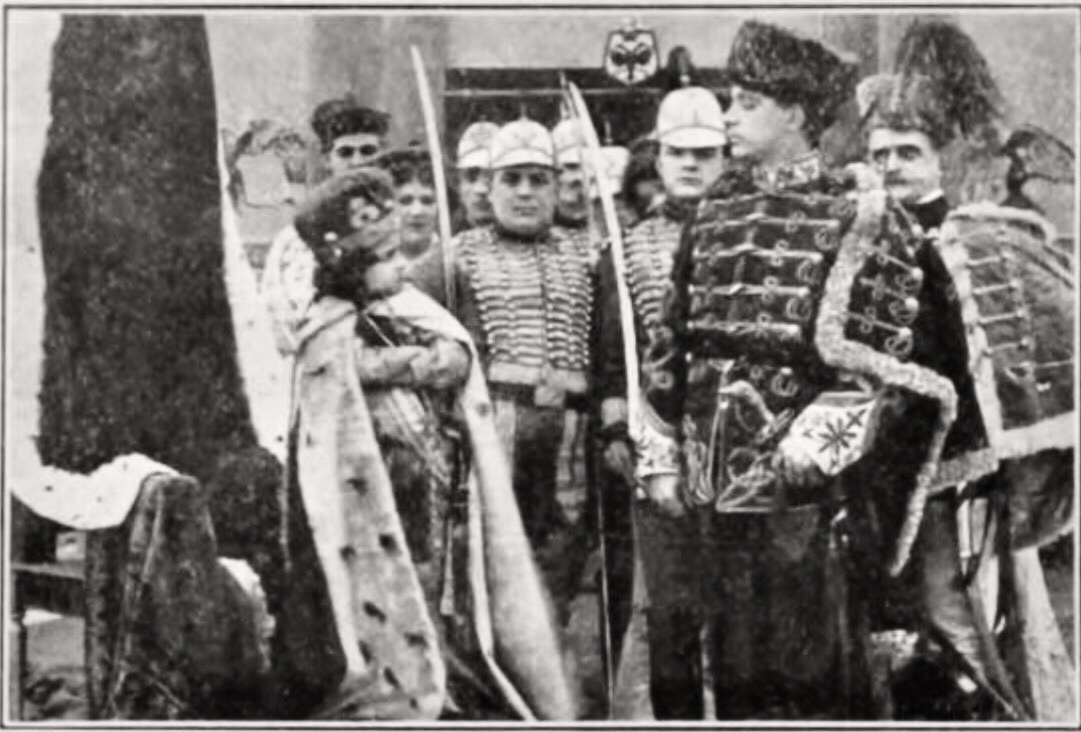
- Produced by: Thanhouser Company
- Starring: William Garwood; Marie Eline; William Russell
- Distributed by: Motion Picture Distributors and Sales Company
- Release date: May 16, 1911
- Country: United States
- Languages: Silent film English intertitles

The Colonel and the King is a 1911 American silent short drama film produced by the Thanhouser Company. The film stars William Garwood, William Russell, and Marie Eline as the "child king".
