= Frankfurters and Quail =

- Starring: William Garwood
- Production company: Thanhouser Company
- Distributed by: Film Supply Company
- Release date: November 17, 1912
- Country: United States
- Languages: Silent film English intertitles

Frankfurters and Quail is a 1912 American silent short drama starring William Garwood.
