= The Smuggler (1911 film) =

- Produced by: Thanhouser Company
- Starring: William Garwood; Florence La Badie; Harry Benham
- Distributed by: Motion Picture Distributors and Sales Company
- Release date: July 25, 1911
- Country: United States
- Languages: Silent film English intertitles

The Smuggler is a 1911 American silent short romantic drama. The film starred William Garwood Florence La Badie and Harry Benham.

== Cast ==
- William Garwood as The Smuggler
- Florence La Badie as The Smuggler's wife
- Harry Benham as The Secret Service Man
