= Jean Darnell =

American silent film actress

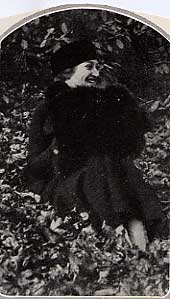
- Born: 1889; Sherman, Texas, U.S.
- Died: January 20, 1961 (aged 71–72); Dallas, Texas, U.S.
- Occupation: Actress
- Years active: 1912–1913

Jean Darnell (1889 – January 20, 1961) was an American silent film actress who had a brief career between 1912 and 1913.

== Career ==
Largely home schooled, Darnell was performing onstage from age five through thirteen, before attending Roanoke College.

In 1913, Darnell was a leading woman for the Thanhouser studio. She also acted for the Kalem Company. By November 1920, she was working in the publicity department of Goldwyn Distributing Corporation.

== Personal life and death ==
Darnell died on January 20, 1961, in Dallas, Texas, survived by her adopted daughter.

== Filmography ==
| Year | Film | Role |
|---|---|---|
| 1912 | Baby Hands | The wife |
| 1912 | Conductor 786 | The Conductor's Son's Wife |
| 1912 | The Voice of Conscience | |
| 1912 | His Father's Son | |
| 1912 | Put Yourself in His Place | Edith Raby, the Squire's Sister |
| 1912 | The Truant's Doom | Tim's Teacher |
| 1912 | The Thunderbolt | The Poor Man's Wife |
| 1912 | The Forest Rose | Young Pioneer Mother |
| 1912 | The Race | The Inventor's Mother |
| 1913 | A Poor Relation | The Widow |
| 1913 | His Uncle's Wives | |
| 1913 | Some Fools There Were | The Aunt |
| 1913 | The Pretty Girl in Lower Five | |
| 1913 | The Two Sisters | The Older Sister |
| 1913 | Cymbeline | The Queen |
| 1913 | The Woman Who Did Not Care | The Witch |
| 1913 | The Widow's Stratagem | |
| 1913 | The Other Girl | The Sister |
| 1913 | Carmen | |
| 1913 | The Farmer's Daughters (1913 film) | Grace, the Farmer's Other Daughter |
