= That's Happiness =

1911 silent film by George Nichols

- Directed by: George Nichols
- Produced by: Thanhouser Company
- Starring: William Garwood; Bertha Blanchard
- Distributed by: Motion Picture Distributors and Sales Company
- Release date: July 18, 1911
- Country: United States
- Languages: Silent film English intertitles

That's Happiness is a 1911 American silent short film drama directed by George Nichols. The film starred William Garwood and Bertha Blanchard.

== Cast ==
- Bertha Blanchard as The Wealthy Old Woman
- William Garwood as The Wealthy Old Woman's Son
