= Standing Room Only (1912 film) =

- Produced by: Thanhouser Company
- Starring: William Garwood; Mignon Anderson
- Distributed by: Film Supply Company
- Release date: December 1, 1912
- Country: United States
- Languages: Silent film English intertitles

Standing Room Only is a 1912 American silent short romantic comedy film starring William Garwood, and Mignon Anderson.

== Cast ==
- Mignon Anderson as The Cook
- William Garwood as The Cook's Sweetheart
