= Riley Chamberlain =

American middle-distance runner

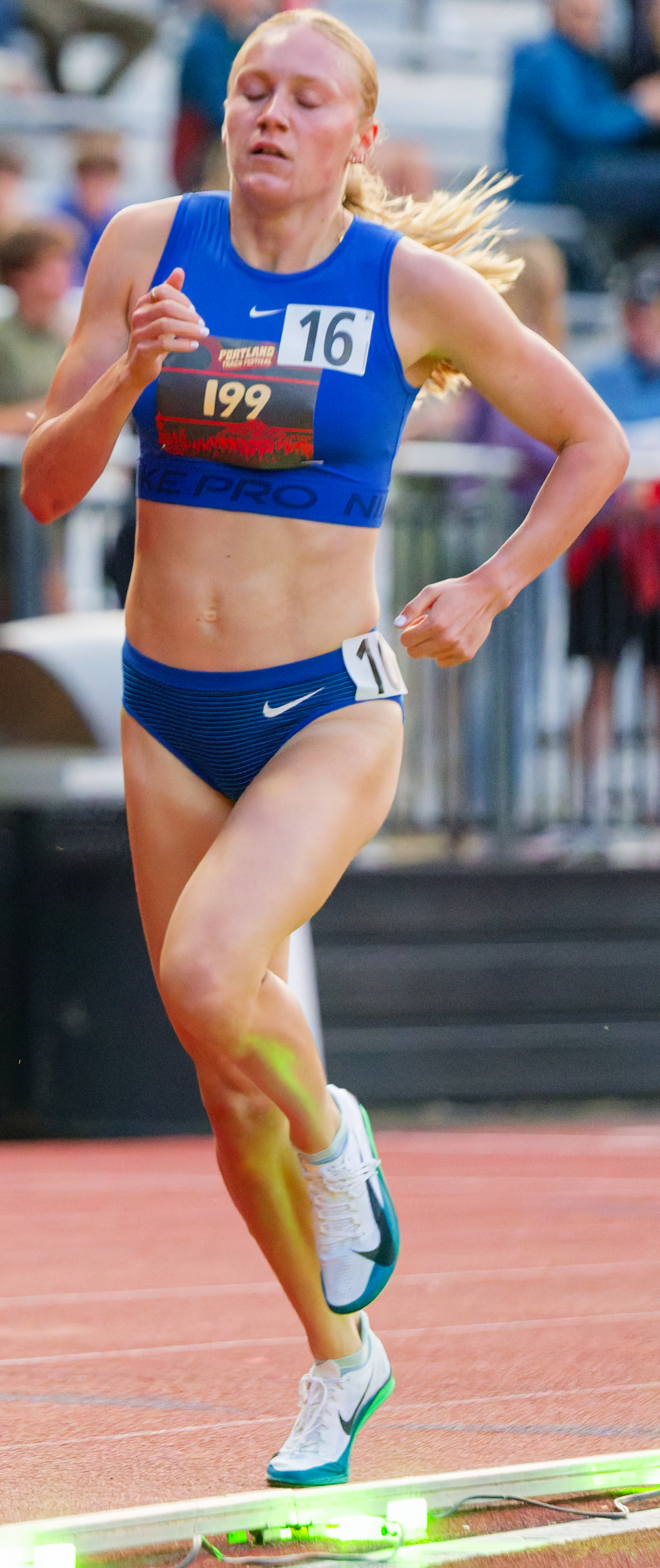

Personal information
- Born: 21 July 2004 (age 22)

Sport
- Sport: Athletics
- Events: Middle-distance running, Long-distance running, Cross country running

Achievements and titles
- Personal bests: 800m: 1:59.75 (Portland, 2025); 1500m: 4:02.03 (Los Angeles, 2025); Mile: 4:20.61 (Boston, 2026); 3000m: 8:40.89 (Seattle, 2025); 5000m: 14:58.97 (Boston, 2025)

Riley Chamberlain (born 21 July 2004) is an American middle- and long-distance, and cross country runner.

== Biography ==
From a family of runners, Chamberlain's father competed at the USA Olympic Trials in the steeplechase, as she ran in track and field at high school alongside her sister, Karissa. Chamberlain attended Del Oro High School prior to competing at the collegiate level for Brigham Young University. She set a BYU record and became the fourth fastest NCAA all-time in the women’s indoor mile run with a time of 4:33.14 at the 2023 Razorback Invitational.

Chamberlain was a member of winning BYU distance medley relay teams at the 2024 and 2025 NCAA Indoor Track and Field Championships. In February 2025, Chamberlain had run alongside Carmen Alder, Meghan Hunter, and Tessa Buswell to set a new collegiate best time of 10:37.58 for the event at the Husky Classic, breaking the previous best mark by over six seconds.

In July 2025, Chamberlain ran a new personal best of 4:02.23 in the 1500 metres whilst competing at the Sunset Tour in Los Angeles. The following week at the Stumptown Twilight in Portland, Oregon, she won the 800 metres in a personal best time of 1:59.75. She qualified for the final of the 1500 metres at 2025 USA Outdoor Track and Field Championships, before falling in a racing incident involving Helen Schlachtenhaufen, and finished behind the pack.

Chamberlain placed fourth in the individual race at the 2025 NCAA Cross Country Championships in Missouri, helping BYU to a second place finish in the team event. On 6 December, she ran 14:58.97 for the 5000 metres in Boston, Massachusetts at the Colyear-Danville Season Opener, finishing runner-up as BYU teammate Jane Hedengren broke the NCAA indoor record. On 1 February, Chamberlain moved into the top-ten NCAA all-time list for the 3000 metres indoors with 8:43.16 at the Millrose Games. On 14 February, Chamberlain ran 4:20.61 to set the collegiate indoor mile run record at the 2026 BU Valentine Invitational. On 14 March, she had a top-five finish in the mile run at the 2026 NCAA Indoor Championships.
