= For Her Sake (1911 film) =

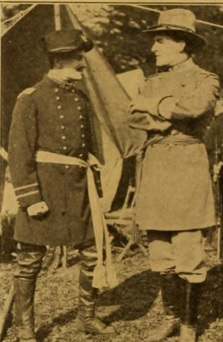
- A surviving film still
- Produced by: Thanhouser Company
- Starring: William Garwood
- Distributed by: Motion Picture Distributors and Sales Company
- Release date: February 14, 1911
- Running time: 1 reel (approximately 10 minutes)
- Country: United States
- Languages: Silent film English intertitles

For Her Sake is a 1911 American silent short war romance film produced by the Thanhouser Company. The film starred William Garwood as a confederate soldier who wins the love of a young Southern girl shortly before the start of the American Civil War. His rival becomes a Union officer and the two are reunited when the Confederate is captured. After receiving news of his capture, the girl manages to sneak through the Union lines to free him. Together they escape and the Union officer tracks them to her home. Prepared to apprehend his foe, he sees his rival mourning the death of the girl, fatally shot during the escape. The two resolve their differences and the officer leaves the house, refusing to arrest the Confederate soldier. The film was released on February 14, 1911 and was met with positive reviews despite plot holes surrounding the girl's ability to elude the guards. The film is now presumed lost.

== Plot ==
The film is a period drama taking place right before the start of the American Civil War. A young Southern girl chooses between two suitors. She chooses the man who goes to fight Stars and Bars of the Confederacy whilst the rejected suitor goes to fight for the Union. During the war, the Confederate soldier is captured and brought before the Union officer who recognizes him as his rival. The Union man is cruel to his rival and tries to break his spirit with harsh treatment. The girl hears of his plight and becomes determined to rescue him. She evades the guards and gives her lover a file to free himself from the bars. Together they flee and are discovered in the final moments of their escape. One of the sentries shoots at the man, but his shot misses and the two flee on horseback. The Union officer is enraged by the escape and tracks the pair to the girl's home just over the Federal line. He sets up guards around the house and enters alone to take them prisoner by his own hand. He makes his way through the house and breaks down the doors to find the man he wants. Upon finding the man, he does not arrest him - for the Confederate soldier is grief-stricken and bending over the body of his fiancée. The bullet the sentry shot at him instead took her life. Together the two rivals mourn her death, and the Union officer leaves without arresting his rival - for her sake.

== Production ==
Little is known about the production credits except for the fact that William Garwood played the role of the Confederate soldier. The director, scenario writer and cameraman is also unknown. Details by reviewers note that the staging surrounding the civil war camps was very good and that the setting for the old Southern home was "excellent and selected with care and attention to detail." The film has several issues that are not resolved or made clear, the first being how the girl learns of his lovers capture and then how she is able to make it through the Union lines. The film is presumed lost because the film is not known to be held in any archive or by any collector.

== Release and reception ==
The single reel drama, approximately 1000 feet long, was released on February 14, 1911. The Valentine's Day release garnered strong reviews from critics. The Billboard praised the story and the setting of the camps. The Moving Picture World found it to be a strong film stating, "The acting and setting are in harmony with the subject. It would be hard to create anything better of the type." The New York Dramatic Mirror was mainly positive in its review, but highlighted the plot holes of how the girl learned of her lover's capture and managed to elude all the guards. The Mirror reviewer also stated that the film's would have been more effective if the Union soldier had not been made out to be a villain.
