= The Voice of Conscience (1912 film) =

- Starring: Florence La Badie; Jean Darnell
- Production company: Thanhouser Company
- Distributed by: Film Supply Company
- Release date: September 3, 1912
- Running time: 14 minutes
- Country: United States
- Languages: Silent; English intertitles

The Voice of Conscience is a 1912 American silent short drama film starring Florence La Badie and Jean Darnell.

== Cast ==
- Florence La Badie as The Orphan
- Edmund J. Hayes as The Father
- Jean Darnell
- Justice Barnes as Doctor
- Harry Benham as Suitor
