= The Coffin Ship =

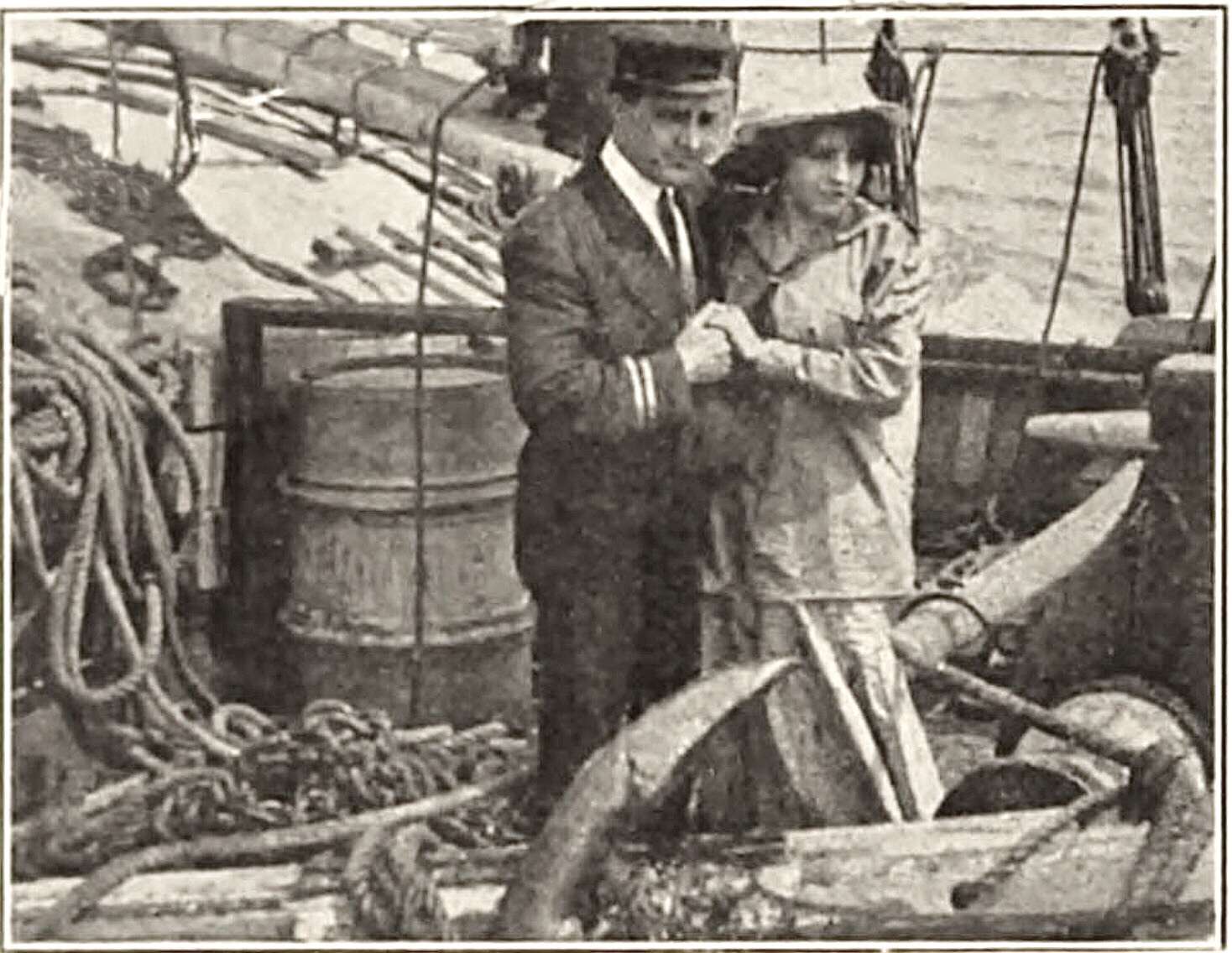
- Directed by: Undetermined
- Produced by: Thanhouser Company
- Starring: William Garwood
- Music by: Original organ score for theaters composed by Andrew Crow
- Distributed by: Motion Picture Distributors and Sales Company
- Release date: June 20, 1911
- Running time: 15 minutes, 35mm 1 reel (1000 feet) (Note: During the silent era, a full film reel had a maximum running time of approximately 15 minutes, with some variations in speed due to the type and condition of projectors used at different theaters. At the time, the generally accepted "standard" for a theatrical film's speed was 18 frames per second. See Kawin, Bruce F. (1987). How Movies Work. University of California Press. p. 46. ISBN 9780520076969.)
- Country: United States
- Languages: Silent; English intertitles

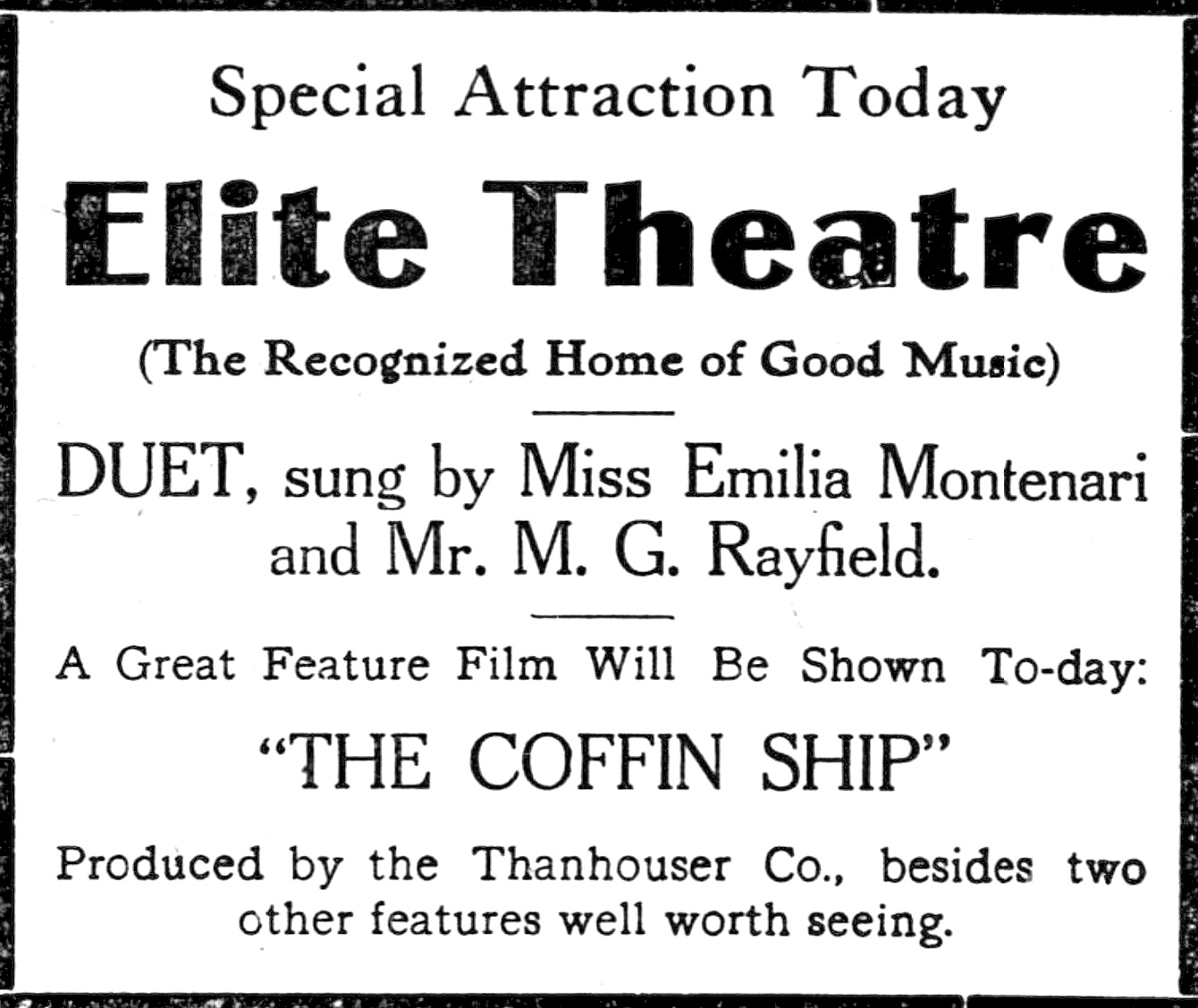
Newspaper advertisement for the "Great Feature Film" in Pensacola, Florida in June 1911

The Coffin Ship is a 1911 American silent adventure film, a nautical melodrama produced by the Thanhouser Company of New Rochelle, New York. Featuring William Garwood in a starring role, the identities of the motion picture's other two principal cast members remain undetermined.

A full print of the film, one distributed in Europe in 1911 with German intertitles and titled Im Meere Verloren ("Lost in the Sea"), is preserved in the collection of the EYE Film Institute in the Netherlands.

== Plot ==
A basic description of the film's storyline is provided in a review of this Thanhouser release in the June 24, 1911 issue of the entertainment publication The Billboard:

A thrilling sea story is told in this film with use of some very extensive property and by remarkably good acting. A frail ship is started on a voyage by the owner, although the captain has warned him that the ship was not seaworthy. The owner's daughter has been secretly married to the captain and, in order to surprise him, stows away, not knowing the condition of the ship. Shortly after making her presence known aboard, water begins to leak into the hull and before long the ship is about to sink. The captain and the girl get aboard a raft and after many days are picked up still alive but weak from fatigue and hunger. In the meantime the girl's father has suffered untold agonies worrying over his daughter's plight of which he had been informed and vows never to allow an unsound vessel to leave the port again. The scenes of the sinking are splendidly worked up and also photographed. The scene on the raft and the rescue are good, and in fact the film is a feature from start to finish.

== Cast ==
- William Garwood as Jack, the ship's captain ("Georg" and "George" in the German release) (Note: In an assessment of the film in the June 28, 1911 issue of The New York Dramatic Mirror, the trade paper's reviewer identifies the captain as "Jack", while in the German copy of the film preserved in the collection of the EYE Institute in Amsterdam, the character is identified as "Georg".)
- Mary, Jack's love interest (actress undetermined)
- Sir Gorden, (Note: On the intertitles in the surviving German copy of the film, this character's name is also cited with two different spellings: "Gordon" and "Gorden".) shipowner and Mary's father (actor undetermined)

== Production ==
The production's interior scenes were filmed at Thanhouser's New York studio in New Rochelle, at the corner of Grove and Warren streets. The scenes of wharves, ship-repair yards, and voyage scenes were filmed on location at the town's nearby harbor on Long Island Sound As was common practice in the early silent era, interior scenes were usually filmed outdoors, utilizing three-sided, open-air sets with no ceilings to take advantage of full sunlight. Later, to more effectively control filming conditions but still have natural lighting, film companies, including Thanhouser, built glass-enclosed studios for their sets. Such outdoor filming of interior scenes is quite evident in The Coffin Ship. In one of the film's early "indoor" scenes—approximately three minutes and thirty seconds into the film—Mary is shown standing alone in the parlor of her father's home, when strong winds cause the covers and pages of magazines on a table to blow open and turn rapidly, while fabric draped along the fireplace's mantel is also buffeted by the winds and flutters unnaturally in an "indoor" environment. In the same scene, as Mary prepares to leave the house, she simulates extinguishing the oil lamp on the table and the room gets noticeably darker, despite the setting being filmed outdoors. This effect was likely created by an assistant to the camera operator, who simply lowered a filter in front of the camera's lens.

== Surviving German copy of film ==
A filmstock copy of The Coffin Ship with a German title and intertitles is preserved in the Jean Desmet Collection of the EYE Institute in Amsterdam in the Netherlands. Released in Germany in 1911 under the title Im Meere Verloren ("Lost in the Sea"), that copy and details about the one-reeler are not generally accessible, as of 2023, on EYE's main online database. A digital copy of the film, however, is provided for viewing by EYE on the streaming service YouTube.
