= William Garwood =

American actor and film director

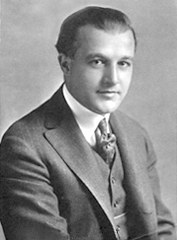
- Garwood, c. 1915
- Born: April 28, 1884; Springfield, Missouri, U.S.
- Died: December 28, 1950 (aged 66); Los Angeles, California, U.S.
- Education: Drury College
- Occupations: Actor, director
- Years active: 1909–1919

William Davis Garwood, Jr. (April 28, 1884 – December 28, 1950) was an American stage and film actor and director of the early silent film era in the 1910s.

Between 1911 and 1913, Garwood starred in a number of early adaptions of popular films, including Jane Eyre and The Vicar of Wakefield (1910), Lorna Doone (1911), The Pied Piper of Hamelin (1911), David Copperfield (1911), The Merchant of Venice (1912), and Little Dorrit (1913), and Robin Hood (1913). In total, he starred in more than 150 short and feature films.

== Early life ==
William Davis Garwood, Jr. was born in Springfield, Missouri. He attended public schools in Springfield before moving to New Mexico at the age of 15.

== Career ==
Garwood left American Studios after eight months and signed a two-year contract with Universal Film Manufacturing Company in late May 1914. Garwood's first picture for Universal was On Dangerous Ground, released in 1915. By this time, Garwood's popularity had risen and he became a popular leading man with a sizable female fan base. During this time, he worked exclusively with a popular actress of the time, Violet Mersereau, with whom he starred in a number of short films. They worked together in many one-reel comedy film that year, including You Can't Always Tell, Destiny's Trump Card, Uncle's New Blazer, The Adventure of the Yellow Curl Papers, Wild Blood and The Supreme Impulse. During his time at Universal, Garwood also starred as the title character in Lord John in New York (now considered lost). Based on the short story by C.N. and A.M. Williamson, the film proved to be popular with audiences and Garwood starred in four more Lord John films over the following months.

== Later years and death ==
By the late 1910s, Garwood's career began to falter because of his chronic alcoholism. He made his final screen appearance in 1919's A Proxy Husband, which he also directed after which he retired. Garwood reportedly lived off of the fortune he made through various investments.

Garwood was a lifelong bachelor and had no children. On December 28, 1950, he died of cirrhosis due to alcoholism in Los Angeles at the age of 66.

== Selected filmography ==
Short subject
| Year | Title | Role | Notes |
|---|---|---|---|
| 1909 | The Cowboy Millionaire | | Alternative titles: Fell Heir to a Million Dollars; The Millionaire Cowboy |
| 1911 | The Pasha's Daughter | | |
| 1911 | Baseball and Bloomers | | |
| 1911 | For Her Sake | Confederate Soldier, Lover | |
| 1911 | Cally's Comet | Jack | |
| 1911 | The Railroad Builder | | |
| 1911 | The Colonel and the King | | |
| 1911 | Flames and Fortune | The Rescuer | |
| 1911 | The Coffin Ship | | |
| 1911 | Courting Across the Court | The Lover | |
| 1911 | Won by Wireless | Wireless Operator | |
| 1911 | That's Happiness | The Wealthy Old Woman's Son | |
| 1911 | The Smuggler | The Smuggler | |
| 1911 | The Buddhist Priestess | The Naval Officer | |
| 1911 | The Higher Law | The Minister | |
| 1911 | David Copperfield | | |
| 1912 | A New Cure for Divorce | The Groom | |
| 1912 | Conductor 786 | The Conductor's Son | |
| 1912 | At the Foot of the Ladder | The Society Leader | |
| 1912 | Please Help the Pore | The Poor Father | |
| 1912 | A Six Cylinder Elopement | John Henderson, Gray's Daughter's Sweetheart | |
| 1912 | Put Yourself in His Place | Henry Little | |
| 1912 | The Little Girl Next Door | The Husband | |
| 1912 | Petticoat Camp | | |
| 1912 | Frankfurters and Quail | | |
| 1912 | The Thunderbolt | The Poor Couple's Son, as an Adult | |
| 1912 | Standing Room Only | The Cook's Sweetheart | |
| 1912 | Aurora Floyd | | |
| 1912 | With the Mounted Police | The Mounted Policeman | |
| 1913 | The Heart of a Fool | Sir Roger Motley | |
| 1913 | The Evidence of the Film | The Broker | |
| 1913 | Some Fools There Were | First Unsuspecting Bachelor | |
| 1913 | Her Gallant Knights | | |
| 1913 | For Her Boy's Sake | The Son | |
| 1913 | The Caged Bird | The Prince | |
| 1913 | The Oath of Pierre | Pierre Dorchet – a Young Trapper | |
| 1913 | Beautiful Bismark | The Real Estate Agent | |
| 1913 | The Lady Killer | | |
| 1913 | The Shoemaker and the Doll | The Shoemaker | |
| 1913 | A Mix-Up in Pedigrees | Bob Brown | |
| 1913 | Through the Sluice Gates | John Browning | |
| 1913 | The Oath of Tsuru San | Ned Winthrop | |
| 1913 | Article 47, L' | | |
| 1913 | The House in the Tree | Jack – age 20 | |
| 1913 | Rick's Redemption | Rick | |
| 1914 | The Ten of Spades | Ralph West – the Prospector | |
| 1914 | A Ticket to Red Horse Gulch | Jack Oliver | |
| 1914 | A Turn of the Cards | John Richards | |
| 1914 | Fate's Decree | John Graves | |
| 1914 | The Green-Eyed Devil | | |
| 1914 | The Hunchback | Tom Carson – a Young Prospector | |
| 1914 | Imar the Servitor | Imar | |
| 1914 | The Body in the Trunk | | |
| 1914 | The Lost Sermon | Rev. John Strong | |
| 1914 | The Unmasking | Harold Clark | |
| 1914 | Nature's Touch | Richard Stone | |
| 1914 | The Cameo of the Yellowstone | Cameo – the Cowpuncher | |
| 1914 | Feast and Famine | Jerry Benton – the Son | |
| 1914 | A Man's Way | Henry | |
| 1914 | Does It End Right? | | |
| 1914 | Their Worldly Goods | Frank Mason | |
| 1914 | Break, Break, Break | Tom Day, a Son of the People | |
| 1914 | The Cocoon and the Butterfly | | |
| 1914 | His Faith in Humanity | Jim Marsh | |
| 1914 | The Taming of Sunnybrook Nell | Steve, a Woodcutter | |
| 1914 | Billy's Rival | Billy Manning | |
| 1914 | Jail Birds | Robert MacFarlane, a young attorney | Alternative title: Jailbirds |
| 1914 | In the Open | Ben Carroll, a Young Ranchman | |
| 1914 | Sweet and Low | | |
| 1914 | Sir Galahad of Twilight | Bryan Kyam | |
| 1914 | Redbird Wins | Philip Pierpont | |
| 1914 | Old Enough to Be Her Grandpa | Rollie – Stephen's Grandson | |
| 1914 | In the Candlelight | Ralph, a Young Art Student | |
| 1914 | The Strength o' Ten | Jep | |
| 1914 | The Sower Reaps | Ben Rolfe | |
| 1915 | The Legend Beautiful | Jose Cordero | |
| 1915 | On Dangerous Ground | Williams – the Bank Cashier | |
| 1915 | The Stake | | |
| 1915 | She Never Knew | | |
| 1915 | The Supreme Impulse | Earl Graham | |
| 1915 | Wild Blood | Walt Hiller | Director |
| 1915 | The Adventure of the Yellow Curl Papers | Ted | Alternative title: The Mystery of the Yellow Curl Papers |
| 1915 | Uncle's New Blazer | Billy | Director |
| 1915 | Destiny's Trump Card | Bill Avery | Director |
| 1915 | You Can't Always Tell | Harrington Spencer – Reporter | Director |
| 1915 | Larry O'Neill | Larry O'Neill | |
| 1915 | Thou Shalt Not Lie | Fred Harnett aka Harrington | |
| 1915 | Driven by Fate | | |
| 1915 | Billy's Love Making | Billy Burnitt | Director |
| 1915 | The Wolf of Debt | Bruce Marsden | |
| 1915 | The Unnecessary Sex | John | |
| 1915 | Getting His Goat | Bill | |
| 1916 | The Grey Sisterhood | Lord John Haselmore | Lord John's Journal ep. 2 |
| 1916 | Three Fingered Jenny | Lord John Haselmore | Lord John's Journal ep. 3 |
| 1916 | The Eye of Horus | Lord John Haselmore | Lord John's Journal ep. 4 |
| 1916 | The League of the Future | Lord John Haselmore | Lord John's Journal ep. 5 |
| 1916 | Billy's War Brides | | Director |
| 1916 | His Picture | | Director |
| 1916 | Two Seats at the Opera | Michael Claney | Director |
| 1916 | The Gentle Art of Burglary | | |
| 1916 | A Society Sherlock | | Director |
| 1916 | He Wrote a Book | | Director |
| 1916 | Arthur's Desperate Resolve | | Director |
| 1916 | A Soul at Stake | | Director |
| 1916 | The Decoy | | Director |
| 1917 | A Magdalene of the Hills | Eric Southward | Alternative title: A Magdalen of the Hills |
| 1917 | The Little Brother | Franak Girard | |
| 1919 | Proxy Husband | | Director |

Features
| Year | Title | Role | Notes |
|---|---|---|---|
| 1915 | Lord John in New York | Lord John Haselmore | Lost film; Lord John's Journal ep. 1 |
| 1916 | Broken Fetters | Lawrence Demarest | |
| 1918 | The Guilty Man | Claude Lescuyer | |
| 1918 | Her Moment | Jan Drakachu | |
| 1918 | Wives and Other Wives | Norman Craig | |
