= Marguerite Snow =

American actress

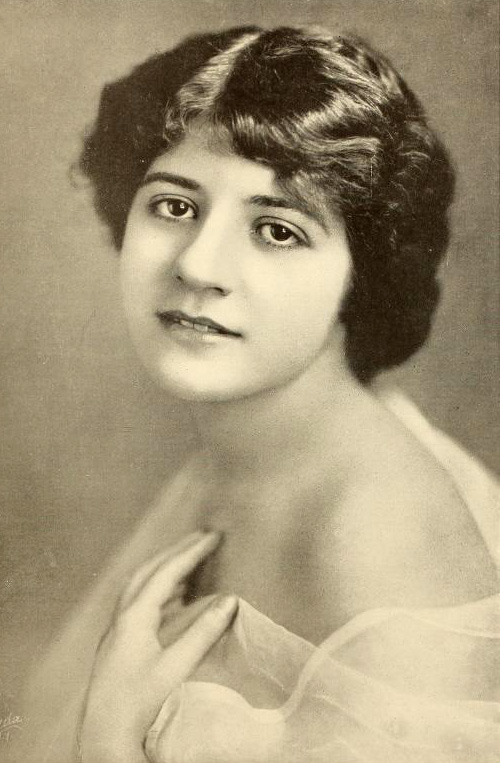
- Snow in 1917
- Born: September 9, 1889; Salt Lake City, Utah, U.S.
- Died: February 17, 1958 (aged 68); Los Angeles, California, U.S.
- Other names: Margaret Snow
- Years active: 1911–1925
- Spouses: James Cruze (m. 1913; div. 1923) Neely Edwards (m. 1925)
- Children: 1

Marguerite Snow (September 9, 1889 – February 17, 1958) was an American silent film and stage actress. In her early films she was billed as Margaret Snow.

== Early life ==
Snow was born in Salt Lake City, Utah. Her father, Billy Snow, was a comedian and a minstrel, and the family lived in Savannah, Georgia. Her mother's maiden name was Lutz. After his death, her mother moved the family to Denver, Colorado. Snow attended Loretta Heights Academy and acted in local summer stock plays. While she lived in Denver, she studied acting.

== Career ==
Snow became an actress at an early age and played many parts while still a child. Her stage career did not begin in earnest until she was sixteen years old. Her first engagement was with James O'Neill in a revival of The Count of Monte Cristo, at the Crawford Theatre in Wichita, Kansas, on February 11, 1907. She played in The College Widow, Mrs. Temple's Telegram, as Elsa in The Devil, and at the Bijou Theater, Wheeling, where as leading lady of the stock company she played ten different parts. On Broadway, she performed in The Devil (1908) and The Other Fellow (1910).

Beginning in 1911, Snow gained prominence in silent films made by the Kinemacolor Company, the Thanhouser Film Company in New Rochelle, New York, and the old Metro Pictures studio before it became MGM. In 1911 she starred in films such as The Moth and The Buddhist Priestess. Some of her later feature pictures are Baseball and Bloomers (1911), A Niagara Honeymoon (1912), The Caged Bird (1913), The Silent Voice (1915), A Corner in Cotton (1916), Broadway Jones (1917), The Veiled Woman (1922), and Kit Carson Over The Great Divide (1925). In Broadway Jones Snow played a pretty stenographer at the Jones' gun factory as the movie's leading lady. This was the first Artcraft photoplay of George M. Cohan. She never made a movie after the introduction of sound to films.

== Marriages ==
Snow was married twice. Her first wedding was in January 1913 to Jens Bosen, a director, whose professional name was James Cruze. He was affiliated with Famous Players–Lasky and was one of the best-known directors in motion pictures. During divorce proceedings in October 1923, Snow testified that her husband frequently beat her. A public beating was responsible for their separation. The couple were at a party in 1921 when the actress requested that James take one of her women friends home. The ensuing quarrel ended with Cruze beating his wife about her face and body. She was knocked to the floor and one of her teeth was dislodged. The couple had one daughter, Julie Jane. Cruze later married silent film actress Betty Compson. After divorcing Cruze, Snow married Neely Edwards, a film comedian, on December 25, 1925. Edwards became master of ceremonies of the local company of The Drunkard. This play ran continuously in Hollywood, California, from 1933 until the late 1950s.

In 1933 Snow's daughter, Julie Jane Cruze, was given nine pieces of property by her father at a time when he feared he might die of a heart ailment. The properties were located in Flintridge, California, and La Canada, California. Julie Jane shared some of the $150,000 in income derived from the bequest with her mother, who was destitute and was living in a trailer. The daughter filed a cross complaint in October 1938 to block a suit by James Cruze to quiet title to the property and return it to him. Julie Jane stated that her father originally gave her the property to avoid losing it to creditors.

== Death ==
In 1957 Snow underwent a kidney operation. Complications occurred, and she died, aged 68, at the Motion Picture Country Home on February 17, 1958, in Los Angeles, California. The Edwards' residence was at 1930 Stewart Street, Santa Monica, California. Funeral arrangements were carried out by Forest Lawn Memorial Park.

== Partial filmography ==
- A Doll's House (1911; short film)
- The Romance of Lonely Island (1911)
- Back to Nature (1911)
- Count Ivan and the Waitress (1911)
- Young Lochinvar (1911)
- Tempter and Dan Cupid (1911)
- The Missing Heir (1911)
- Honeymooners (1911)
- Five Rose Sisters (1911)
- Burglar and Bride (1911)
- The Tomboy (1911)
- She (1911)
- The Lady from the Sea (1911)
- Baseball and Bloomers (1911)
- The Old Curiosity Shop (1911)
- The Railroad Builder (1911)
- The Buddhist Priestess (1911)
- Dr. Jekyll and Mr. Hyde (1912)
- A Six Cylinder Elopement (1912)
- The Woman in White (1912)
- Put Yourself in His Place (1912)
- The Little Girl Next Door (1912)
- For Her Boy's Sake (1913)
- The Caged Bird (1913)
- The Million Dollar Mystery (1914)
- The Patriot and the Spy (1915)
- His Guardian Auto (1915)
- The Second in Command (1915)
- The Silent Voice (1915)
- A Corner in Cotton (1916)
- Notorious Gallagher (1916)
- Broadway Jones (1917)
- The Hunting of the Hawk (1917)
- The Eagle's Eye (1918)
- The Woman in Room 13 (1920)
- Felix O'Day (1920)
- Lavender and Old Lace (1921)
- The Veiled Woman (1922)
- Chalk Marks (1924)
- With Kit Carson Over the Great Divide (1925)
- Savages of the Sea (1925)
