= The Higher Law (1911 film) =

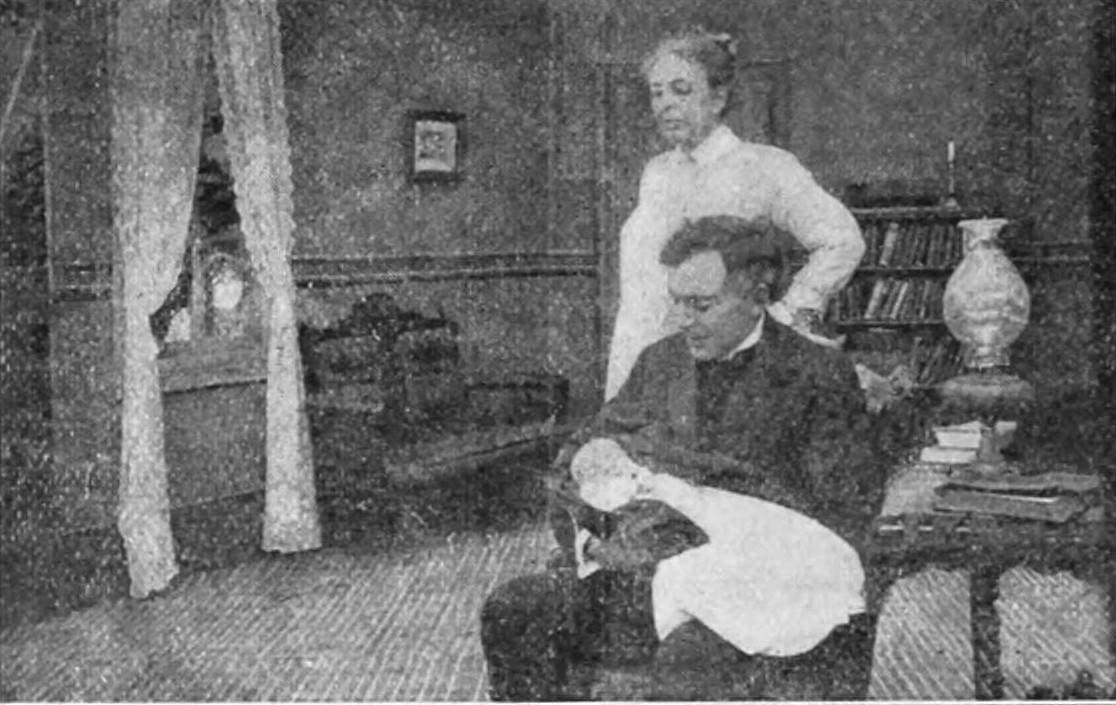
- Scene from the film
- Directed by: George Nichols
- Starring: William Garwood; James Cruze; William Russell
- Production company: Thanhouser Company
- Distributed by: Motion Picture Distributors and Sales Company
- Release date: October 10, 1911
- Country: United States
- Languages: Silent film English intertitles

The Higher Law is a 1911 American silent short film drama directed by George Nichols. The film starred William Garwood and James Cruze.
