= Hypnotized (1910 film) =

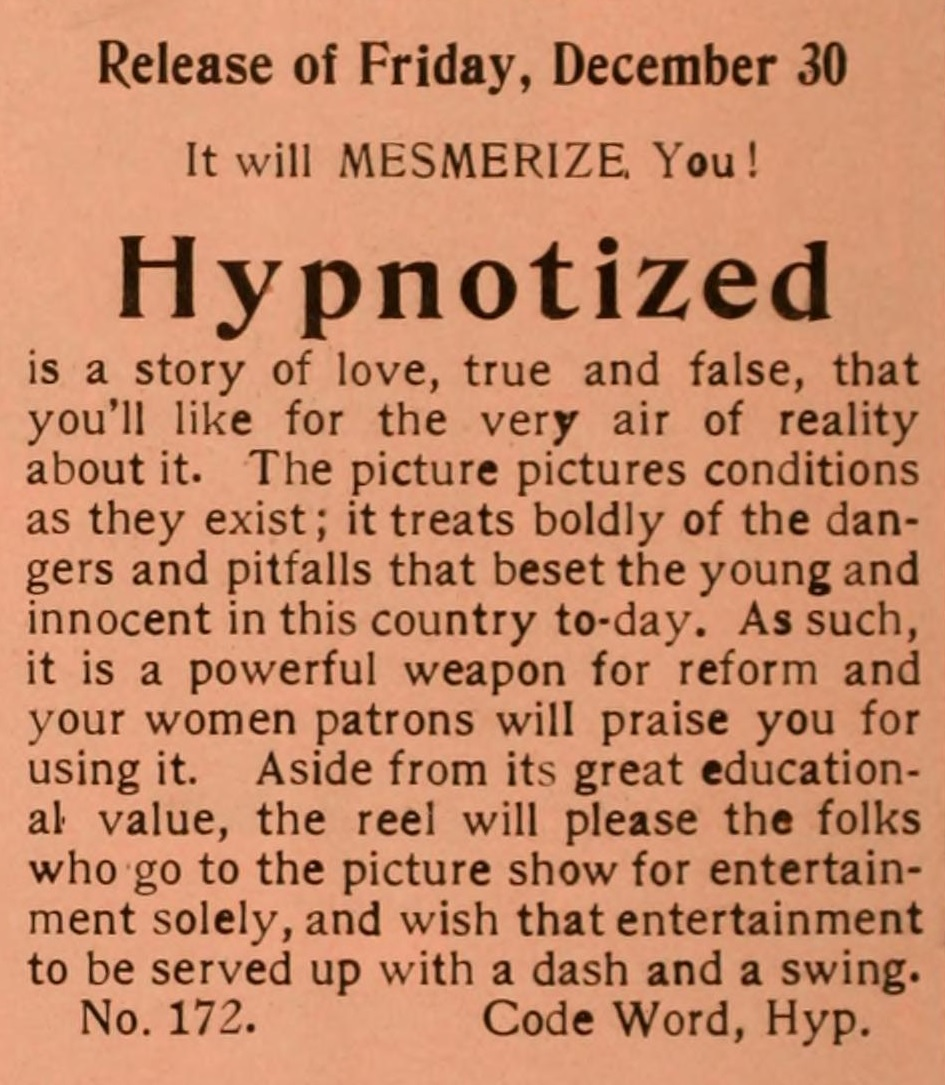
- An advertisement for the film in The Moving Picture World
- Produced by: Thanhouser Company
- Distributed by: Motion Picture Distributing and Sales Company
- Release date: December 30, 1910
- Country: United States
- Languages: Silent film English intertitles

Hypnotized, released in Britain as A Quack Hypnotist, is a 1910 American silent short drama produced by the Thanhouser Company. The film focuses on May Smalley and Jack, who loves her, who attend a traveling show that comes to their little town. The show consists of a hypnotist and a Hindu magician and proves to be a popular show, but the hypnotist who is becomes interest in May. The hypnotist lures May away by telling her that he has a message for her from the spirit world and later gets her to leave town with him. Jack knocks the magician down and takes his costume and follows the hypnotist and May back to their hotel, where he rescues her. Aside from William Russell's role in the film, the production and cast credits are unknown. The film was released on December 30, 1910, it was met with positive reviews. The film is presumed lost.

== Plot ==
Though the film is presumed lost, a synopsis survives in The Moving Picture World from December 31, 1910. It states, "May Smalley is a simple little country girl with whom Jack, a youth whom she has known since childhood, is very much in love. When a traveling show, consisting of a hypnotist and a Hindu magician comes to the opera house in her little town, the two young people are among the other interested spectators who flock to see the performance. May's youth and beauty attract the hypnotist, who plans to lure her away from her home. He sends May a message that he has a communication for her from the spirit world. Against the protest of Jack, her escort, May goes behind the scenes after the performance to meet with the great hypnotist, who fascinates her with his wiles. The hypnotist is an unscrupulous villain, and seeing that May is thoroughly impressed with his few tricks and considers him quite superhuman, he induces her to follow him when he leaves the town. How Jack proves himself to be a youth of resource as well as courage, the important part he played in May's deliverance by the Hindu fakir, is well told by the picture. Finally the hypnotist is shown in his true light. May is disillusioned, and comes to decide that Jack is just about the kind of protection she needs in a world of uncertainty." According to a reviewer, Jack comes up to the stage where the Hindu magician is and knocks him down. Jack takes his costume and follows the hypnotist and May to the hotel where he rescues her.

== Cast ==
- William Russell as the hypnotist.

== Production ==
The writer of the scenario is unknown, but it was most likely Lloyd Lonergan. He was an experienced newspaperman employed by The New York Evening World while writing scripts for the Thanhouser productions. The film director is unknown, but it may have been Barry O'Neil or Lucius J. Henderson. Cameramen employed by the company during this era included Blair Smith, Carl Louis Gregory, and Alfred H. Moses, Jr. though none are specifically credited. The role of the cameraman was uncredited in 1910 productions. According to Bowers the cast credits are unknown, but many 1910 Thanhouser productions are fragmentary. Though a production still shows William Russell in the film. In late 1910, the Thanhouser company released a list of the important personalities in their films. The list includes G.W. Abbe, Justus D. Barnes, Frank H. Crane, Irene Crane, Marie Eline, Violet Heming, Martin J. Faust, Thomas Fortune, George Middleton, Grace Moore, John W. Noble, Anna Rosemond, Mrs. George Walters.

This film was an example of the use of the character names Jack and May, which were to be repeatedly used by Lonergan in various productions. Bowers writes, "It developed that Lloyd F. Lonergan, ... liked these names, and during the years to come used them again and again. One can imagine that it must have become a studio joke to decide who was to play Jack and who was to play May. In actuality, names such as Jack and May were used in printed synopses to keep track of who was who, but such names were usually not mentioned in the film's subtitles. Patrons watching the picture in a theatre had not the foggiest idea whether the hero was named Jack, Bertram, or Ezekiel." The first usage of the two leading character roles was in Dots and Dashes.

== Release and reception ==
The single reel drama, approximately 1,000 feet long, was released on December 30, 1910. The film was released in Britain under the title A Quack Hypnotist on April 26, 1913. The film likely had a wide national release, known advertising theaters include those in Arizona, Pennsylvania, and Kansas. Some theaters did not provide the production credits, complicating identification with Selig Polyscope's Hypnotized. The film received a positive review in the Moving Picture World which said, "It is a good story, well told, and the audience seems intensely interested in it." The New York Dramatic Mirror offered a review that neither commended or criticized the production in its summary review of the film.

== See also ==
- List of American films of 1910
