= The Mummy (1911 film) =

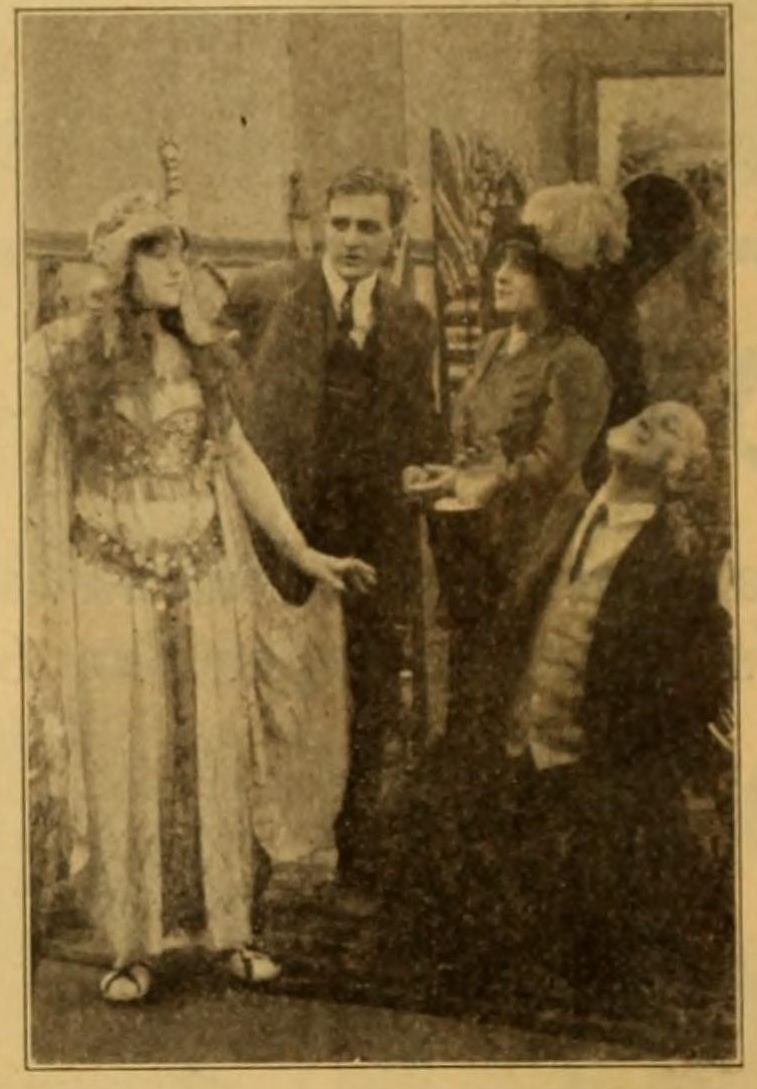
- Surviving film still
- Produced by: Thanhouser Company
- Starring: William Garwood; Harry Benham
- Distributed by: Motion Picture Distributing and Sales Company
- Release date: March 7, 1911
- Running time: 1 reel (approximately 15 minutes
- Country: United States
- Languages: Silent; English intertitles

The Mummy is a 1911 American short silent film produced by the Thanhouser Company. The film details the story of Jack Thornton, a businessman, who is in love with Professor Dix's daughter. Jack purchases a mummy and plans to win his respect as an Egyptologist, but the mummy is reanimated in Jack's room by a live electrical wire. The mummy takes immediate interest in Jack, but is rejected and mummifies him. Before Professor Dix can cut up the now-mummified Jack, she returns and saves him. Jack explains everything and the film concludes with Professor Dix marrying the mummy.

The production was one of several films of the same name produced in 1911 and was met with favorable reviews. The film is presumed to be lost.

== Plot ==
The original synopsis of the film was published in the Moving Picture World as follows: "Professor Dix has won fame as a scientist and has collected many objects of Egyptian ware, centuries old, that arouse the enthusiasm of his associates. Even Jack Thornton, an active, go-ahead young businessman, is interested in the professor's home, but although he tries to pretend it is Egyptology which interests him, the professor's fair young daughter is really the lodestone. Jack decides to win the old man's respect by posing as an Egyptologist himself. To start his collection, he purchases a mummy at an auction sale, and takes it home expecting that later he can make a great hit with his sweetheart's father, by presenting it to him as a gift. While the mummy is in Jack's room, a live electric wire is by accident brought in contact with it. The body has been so perfectly mummified, that the electric current is all that is necessary to ignite the vital spark, and Jack is amazed to see dancing forth from the case which he thought contained only unattractive rags and bones, a beautiful Egyptian princess. As soon as she is released, the mummy makes violent love to Jack, and causes his sweetheart to quarrel with him (for how can a plain businessman explain the presence in his room of a beautiful barbarian?). When her love is spurned, the visitor from the distant past avenges herself by having Jack made into a mummy and placed in the case in her stead. Her heart relents, however, in time to save him from being 'cut up' by the professor, who with the sharp knife, starts to investigate the contents of the mummy case. But all ends happily when Jack's plain statements of the seemingly impossible facts are proved true by the professor. Jack is reunited to his sweetheart, and the professor, being a widower, also an ardent admirer of everything antique, leads the recreated Egyptian lady to the altar, in spite of the fact that there is a difference of several thousand years in their ages."

== Cast ==
- William Garwood as Jack
- Harry Benham likely as Professor Dix

== Production ==
The writer of the scenario is unknown, but it was most likely Lloyd Lonergan. He was an experienced newspaperman employed by The New York Evening World while writing scripts for the Thanhouser productions. The film director is unknown, but it may have been Barry O'Neil or Lucius J. Henderson. Cameramen employed by the company during this era included Blair Smith, Carl Louis Gregory, and Alfred H. Moses, Jr. though none are specifically credited. The role of the cameraman was uncredited in 1910 productions. According to Bowers the cast credits are unknown, but many Thanhouser productions are fragmentary. Though a production still shows William Russell in the film. In late 1910, the Thanhouser company released a list of the important personalities in their films. The list includes G.W. Abbe, Justus D. Barnes, Frank H. Crane, Irene Crane, Marie Eline, Violet Heming, Martin J. Faust, Thomas Fortune, George Middleton, Grace Moore, John W. Noble, Anna Rosemond, Mrs. George Walters.

The film was given the production code number 191 and had a code word of "Mum". A catalog listed the film's length at 995 feet. The film's expected run-time was fifteen minutes and was billed by the Thanhouser Company as having many novelties and being of a comedic nature. It was released on March 7, 1911, and listed as a drama by the Moving Picture World. It was distributed by the Motion Picture Distributing and Sales Company. The production came during a time of renewed interest in Egyptology in which Pathé and Urban Films would release their own films titled The Mummy. This would be followed by Essanay Studios in 1912 with the release of When Soul Meets Soul and Gaumont's The Vengeance of Egypt. The film had a unique special effect in which the bodies of the cast dissolve and take an aerial flight to Egypt at the end of the film.

== Reception ==
The film has had known viewings across several states, including Wisconsin, Pennsylvania, and Kansas. An advertisement for the Lyric Theater in Indiana noted the film's debut, but unambiguously included notes for "Miss Hawthorne" and "Dot Washburn" on the bill. Both Miss Hawthorne and Dot Washburn were not credited in the film in any source and were likely other acts in part of the theater's bill for March 7, 1911.

A review in the Moving Picture World confirmed that the novelty of a "mummy walking out of a case as an Egyptian Princess is sufficiently unusual to create interest, and this interest is increased when, after the young man has spurned her love, she forces him into the case and he becomes a mummy." Another review more generically reflected on the production as being "exceptionally good as to photography, acting, staging" alongside other productions. Three other reviews in Billboard, The New York Dramatic Mirror and The Morning Telegraph were all positive with emphasis on the special effects.

Pantelis Michelakis and Maria Wyke's book The Ancient World in Silent Cinema provides additional nuance in noting the film's erotic underpinnings in which the past is bridged to the present through marriage to the re-animated Egyptian princess. The film has erroneously been claimed to be the earliest "Mummy"-themed film, but The Monster Book notes films including Robbing Cleopatra's Tomb from 1899 and La Momie du roi in 1909 as earlier examples. The film is presumed to be lost.
