= The Lucky Shot =

1910 film

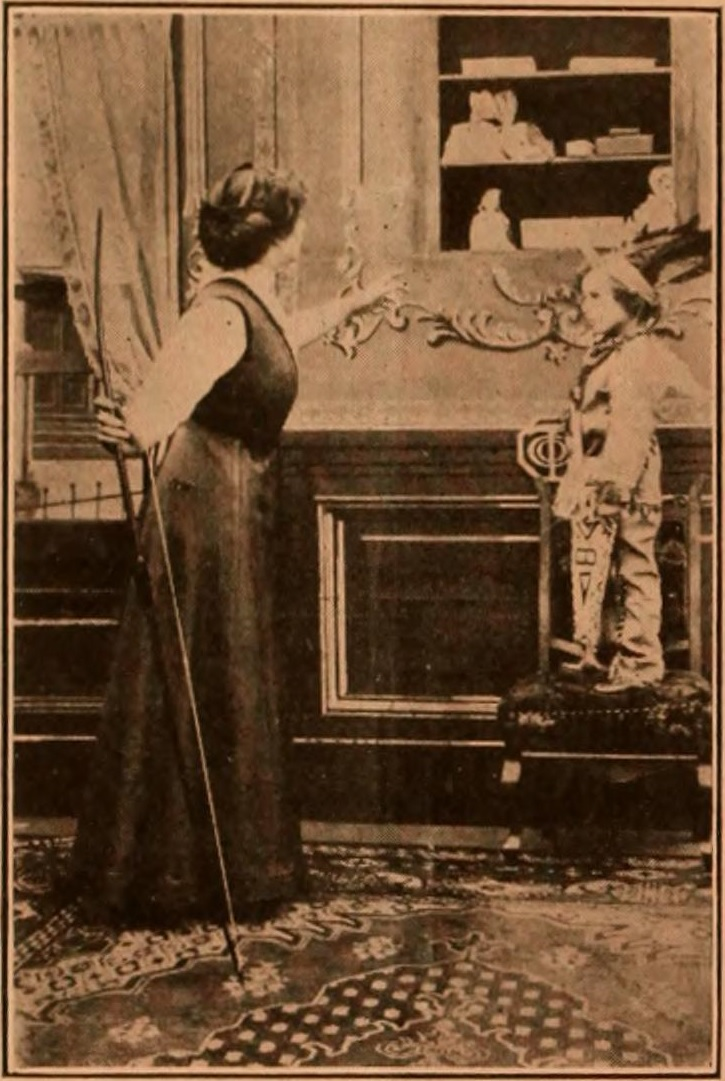
- A film still showing the hidden cache
- Produced by: Thanhouser Company
- Release date: July 12, 1910
- Country: United States
- Languages: Silent film English intertitles

The Lucky Shot is a 1910 American silent short drama produced by the Thanhouser Company. The plot follows Jack Hunt, the son of a wealthy woman, who weds a chorus singer Nell Horsley. Jack's mother forgives the son's error, but rejects his wife. Then Jack is killed while on strike duty in the local militia and the Nell and her child struggle in poverty. Nell begs her mother-in-law for aid, but the woman is enraged and drops dead. Her property goes to the young boy who saves the financial future of the family by finding a hidden fortune with a lucky shot while playing 'Indian'. Released on July 12, 1910, the film received positive attention and saw an international release. The film is presumed lost.

== Plot ==
Though the film is presumed lost, a synopsis survives in The Moving Picture World from July 16, 1910. It states: "A shot that found a fortune! Jack Hunt, the son of a wealthy woman, falls in love with Nell Horsley, who is in the chorus of a musical comedy. They are married, but when Jack's mother is informed she declares she'll have nothing to do with Nell, although she is willing to forgive her son. But Jack sticks to his wife, and for a time they are very happy. Then Jack, who is in the militia, is called out on strike duty, and meets his death during a fight with strikers. The widow takes the news to her mother-in-law, who nevertheless retains her hatred for Nell, despite the tragedy. As time passes, Mrs. Hunt becomes a miser. She disposes of all of her property, receiving in exchange money and jewels which she hides in a secret place in her room. In the meantime Nell has a hard time to get along and keep a roof over her head and that of her little boy. So desperate are her circumstances that she finally sinks her pride and appeals to her mother-in-law. The old woman repulses her again; her fit of rage brings on a stroke of apoplexy and she drops dead after Nell leaves. All her property goes to little George, as the woman left no will, but search fails to locate anything except the family homestead. Nell is about to sell that, when she makes a discovery. Playing 'Indian' with her boy, she shoots arrows aimlessly about the room. One of them hits the secret spring of the treasure vault, and the accident puts the boy and his mother beyond want for the rest of their lives."

The synopsis is at odds with the reviewers of the film who state that the arrow which reveals the hidden cache is shot by the little boy and not the mother. The image still shows the woman with a large bow, but further details by the reviewers state that the boy used a toy bow and arrow to make the shot.

== Production ==
The writer of the scenario is unknown, but it was most likely Lloyd Lonergan. Lonergan was an experienced newspaperman employed by The New York Evening World while writing scripts for the Thanhouser productions. The film can be seen as having another loose aspect to labor issues. The film directly followed first Thanhouser film to address the subject: The Girl Strike Leader. The film loosely refers labor relations when Jack Hunt is killed in a riot while on strike duty and the young widow is struggles to make ends meet. Thanhouser subjects would deal with other pressing social issues in The Girls of the Ghetto, another July 1910 release. The plot of The Lucky Shot employed the deus ex machina technique to resolve the financial needs of the widow and her child. Another plot of a needy family suddenly finding a concealed fortune within their house would be reused in The Thunderbolt. The film director and the cameraman are unknown and the only credits known for the cast is that of Marie Eline as the little boy and Mrs. George W. Walters in the role of the miserly woman. Other members cast may have included the other leading players of the Thanhouser productions, Anna Rosemond, Frank H. Crane and Violet Heming.

== Release and reception ==
The single reel drama, approximately 1000 feet long, was released on July 12, 1910. The film minor praise from The Morning Telegraph for an interesting story and plot and another review in The Moving Picture World liked the novelty of the film's premise. Though The New York Dramatic Mirror gives the most detailed review because it recognizes that the film is not as appealing as other Thanhouser films and recognizes that an obvious error in the production when Marie Eline picks up a seemingly weightless bag of gold. The film had a wide release in the United States with known advertisements appearing in Pennsylvania, Kansas, and Indiana. The film looks to have made its way into Canada with the Province making a series of advertisements for The Lucky Shot, but one states the film is a comedy in and another contains only a partial summary. The film saw its United Kingdom release on January 1, 1911.

== See also ==
- List of American films of 1910
