= Home Made Mince Pie =

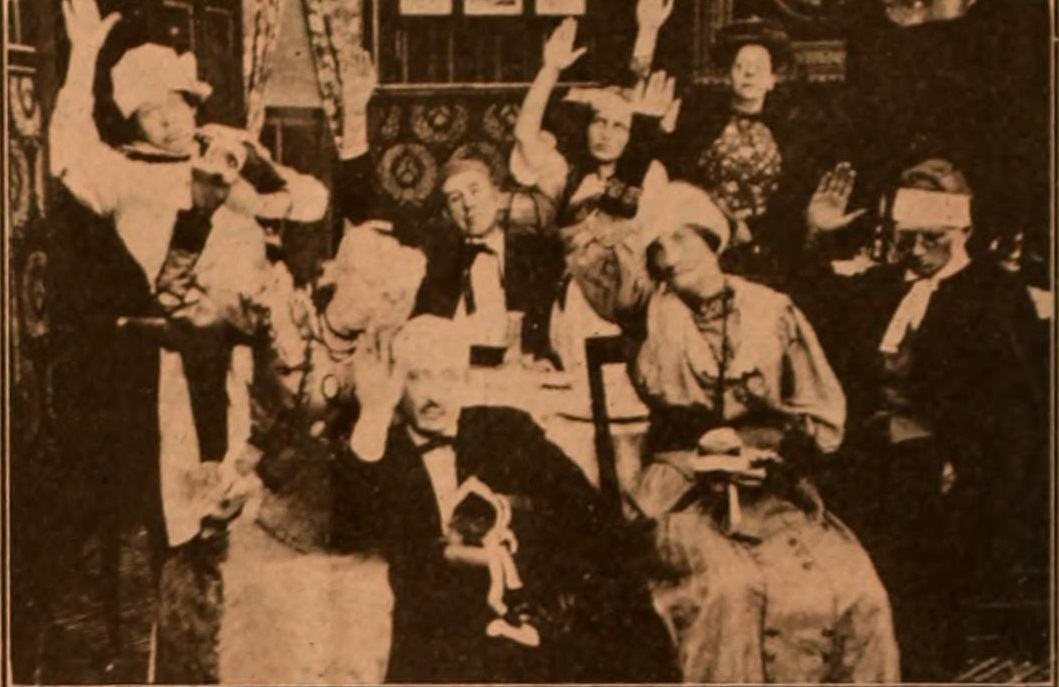
- A surviving film still
- Produced by: Thanhouser Company
- Distributed by: Motion Picture Distributing and Sales Company
- Release date: September 27, 1910
- Country: United States
- Languages: Silent film English inter-titles

Home Made Mince Pie is a 1910 American silent short comedy produced by the Thanhouser Company. The film is a comedy of circumstances, in which the Gale family is going to host a dinner. The focus of the humor is in a mince pie that brandy is added to in an attempt to make it more appreciable, but three people each add brandy to the pie. Everyone becomes tipsy upon eating the pie, including the family cat, and the film concludes. No cast or staff credits for this film are known. The film was released on September 27, 1910, to mixed reviews in trade publications. Reviewers mentioned that the film was too long and it was unbelievable that one pie split eight ways would be able to impact everyone. The film is presumed lost.

== Plot ==
Though the film is presumed lost, a synopsis survives in The Moving Picture World from September 24, 1910. It states: "Life in a country town is often tedious and tiresome, and were it not for the little dinners and teas the townsfolk are constantly given, existence in some localities would be a very dreary thing indeed. So the time honored get-togethers of the small town are an established feature to the social calendar; they are just as much a matter of necessity and as such have come to stay. The Gales thought well of this established feature. They made it a joyous occasion for themselves as well as their guests. They were hardly an overly wealthy family, and their table was never notable for an oversupply of the good things of life, but whenever they gave a dinner they cast all thoughts of economy to the country winds and worked to the one end that their guests have a pleasant time."

"On the night before such an event neither Mamma, Pappa, or Daughter Gale could get those minutes' solid sleep for thought that they might have overlooked some essential in the guests' comfort. At the first crow of the rooster they would come hopping down to the kitchen to get the larder into shape. So little wonder that on occasion of the dinner here pictured - when the prize dish was a splendid homemade mince pie - the Gales were ever looking after the need of the said pie. First Mamma Gale would tiptoe to the table whereupon it sat in solemn state, and give it a stir; then Pappa Gale would tiptoe over and give it a stir; finally Daughter Gale would have to come over and honor it likewise. Then arrived the guests. The Minister and the Mrs. Minister, they were, and some neighbors. While she was receiving them the recollection came to Mamma Gale that the beloved mince pie had not received its flavoring. Off she speeds to a decanter of whiskey in the kitchen. She pours into the pie the right proportion of liquor, and goes back to her guests. Then Pappa Gale remembers that the pie has not been flavored. He, too, excuses himself and a moment later is found pouring whiskey into the sacred mince. No sooner has he ceased and returned to his guest than Daughter Gale, who has just remembered about the forgotten flavoring, rushes in and makes for the whiskey. She pours 'the right proportion' in, too."

== Production ==
The writer of the scenario is unknown, but it was most likely Lloyd Lonergan. He was an experienced newspaperman employed by The New York Evening World while writing scripts for the Thanhouser productions. The film director is unknown, but it may have been Barry O'Neil. Film historian Q. David Bowers does not attribute a cameraman for this production, but at least two possible candidates exist. Blair Smith was the first cameraman of the Thanhouser company, but he was soon joined by Carl Louis Gregory who had years of experience as a still and motion picture photographer. The role of the cameraman was uncredited in 1910 productions. The cast credits are unknown, but many 1910 Thanhouser productions are fragmentary. In late 1910, the Thanhouser company released a list of the important personalities in their films. The list includes G.W. Abbe, Justus D. Barnes, Frank H. Crane, Irene Crane, Marie Eline, Violet Heming, Martin J. Faust, Thomas Fortune, George Middleton, Grace Moore, John W. Noble, Anna Rosemond, Mrs. George Walters. A surviving film still gives the possibility of identifying eight actors.

== Release and reception ==
The single reel comedy, approximately 1,000 feet long, was released on September 27, 1910. The film likely had a wide national release, with advertisements in theaters known in Indiana, Kansas, Wisconsin, and Pennsylvania. The film would also be shown in Vancouver, British Columbia, Canada and was met with praise by the audience at the Province Theatre. In 1917, years after the film's release, the film was approved without censorship by the Pennsylvania State Board of Censors of Moving Pictures.

The Moving Picture World reviewer found the subject to be too long, but did not find it to be a fault. The reviewer states, "A domestic comedy with a different flavor. In fact, with a mince pie for a basis the flavor comes to resemble brandy very strongly by the time that the cook, the maid and the mistress of the house and her daughter have added the proper proportion of flavoring, neither one knowing that the others have done likewise. The humor in this piece centers around this pie. What happened to the guests who partook of it certainly draws upon the imagination. Imagine eight people, not to speak of the cat, getting drunk on the brandy in one mince pie! ... We do not single out this subject as being more evidently padded than others shown on the screen this week. Licensed as well as Independents were guilty and it is time that the manufacturers realize the importance of the scenario end of matters. The mince pie episode was well done, which is the faint praise that we do not like to mete out to anyone." Walton of The Moving Picture News was not amused by the plot and stated, "To me the last scene had no humor. It was only the necessary ending to the beginning. True humor does not emanate from cognac." The New York Dramatic Mirror stated, "This is the old story of too many cooks, and it is quite funny after the first scenes are out of the way. The early part of the film takes too much time with trivial details leading up to the final situation. ... A weak point in the story is the fact that the pie is cut into eight small pieces, making it difficult to believe in its remarkable power. Two pies would have been as easy to make as one and would have been more convincing. The character parts are all well taken, although the cook would have been better if she had not seized so many opportunities to talk directly at the camera."

== See also ==
- List of American films of 1910
