= Pocahontas (1910 film) =

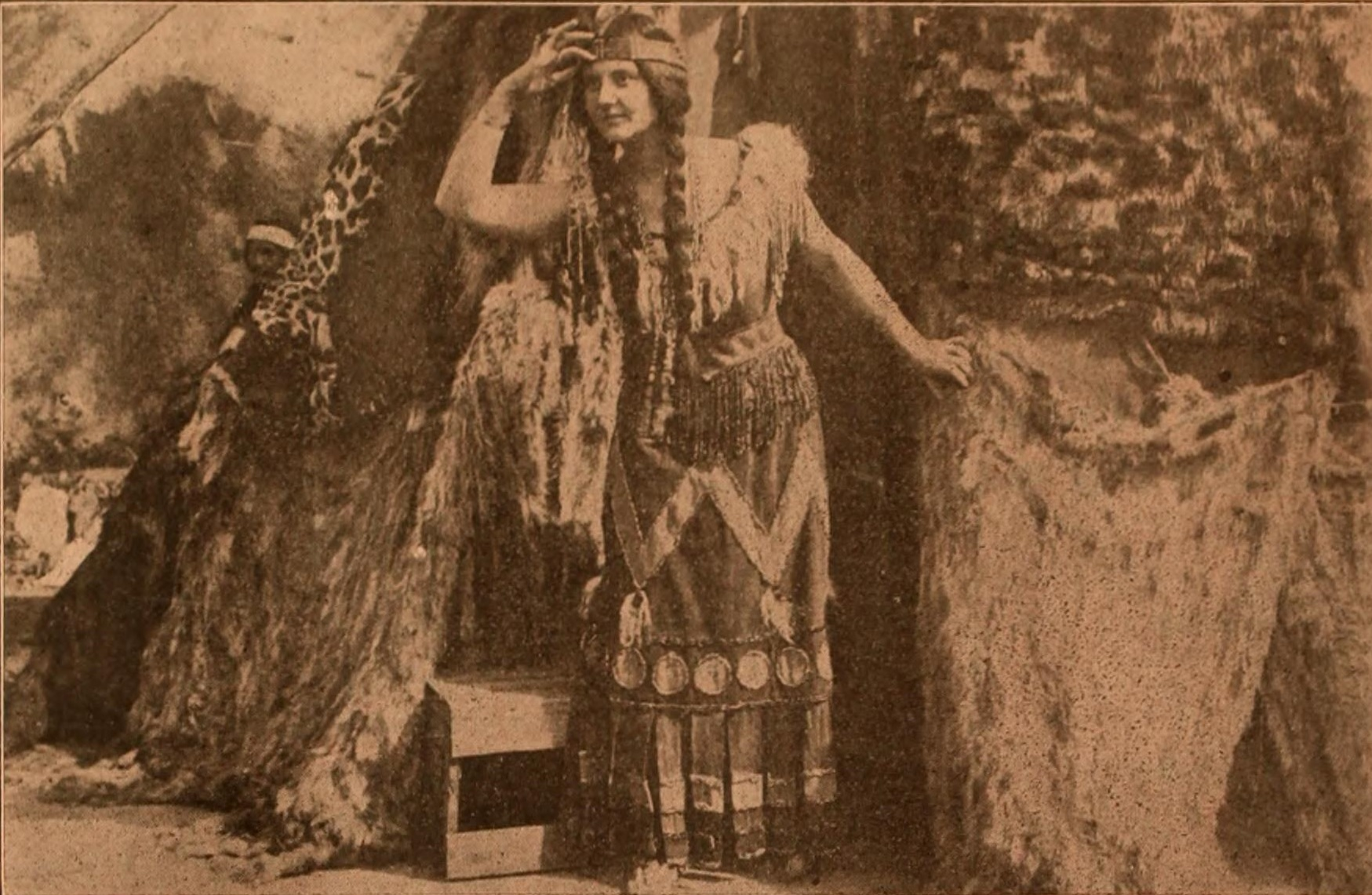
- Anna Rosemond as Pocahontas
- Written by: Lloyd Lonergan
- Produced by: Thanhouser Company
- Starring: Anna Rosemond
- Distributed by: Motion Picture Distributing and Sales Company
- Release date: October 11, 1910
- Country: United States
- Languages: Silent film English intertitles

Pocahontas is a 1910 American silent short drama produced by the Thanhouser Company. The scenario was written by Lloyd Lonergan based on Lydia Sigourney's 1841 poem Pocahontas. The film is a retelling of the well-known story of Pocahontas, played by Anna Rosemond who saves the life of Captain John Smith, played by George Barnes. She is captured and held hostage by the English, converts to Christianity and marries Rolfe, played by Frank H. Crane. Pocahontas then sickens and dies, spending her last hours wishing to return to her native home. Released on October 11, 1910, the film was met with praise by most reviewers. It is believed that a replica of Hendrik Hudson's ship, Halve Maen, was used for the opening scene to establish the Jamestown landing. Though minor costuming and historical accuracy errors were pointed out, the film was praised as being of the highest quality of any Independent company. The film is presumed lost.

== Plot ==
Though the film is presumed lost, a synopsis survives in The Moving Picture World from October 15, 1910. It states: "Captain John Smith comes to America as the head of a band of English colonists and settles in Jamestown, Virginia. While at the head of the colony Smith makes a trip of exploration into the interior and is captured there by King Powhatan, the acknowledged head of all of the red men in Virginia. Powhatan orders his prisoner's execution. Just as the fatal club is about to descend, Pocahontas, the favorite daughter of the King, throws herself before her father. She begs so fervently that the white man's life be spared that Powhatan relents and orders his release. Captain Smith returns in safety to his friends. Later Pocahontas is taken prisoner by the English and held as hostage. While a prisoner, she is converted to Christianity, and falls in love with Rolfe, a handsome young Englishman. They are married in a rude little church at Jamestown, and the Indian princess sails away with her husband to England. There she is received with royal honors by King James I, but the foreign flower cannot stand transplanting. She soon sickens and dies, and in her last hours is visited by visions of the home in the wilderness that she would fly back to if she could."

== Cast ==
- Anna Rosemond as Pocahontas
- George Barnes as Captain John Smith
- Frank Hall Crane as John Rolfe

== Production ==
Lloyd Lonergan adapted the story from Lydia Sigourney's poem Pocahontas. Originally published in 1841 as part of Pocahontas and Other Poems. Film historian Q. David Bowers states that while the story of Pocahontas was well-known, few people had ever read Sigourney's poem. Lonergan an experienced newspaperman employed by The New York Evening World while writing scripts for the Thanhouser productions. The film director is unknown, but it may have been Barry O'Neil. Bowers does not attribute a cameraman for this production, but at least two possible candidates exist. Blair Smith was the first cameraman of the Thanhouser company, but he was soon joined by Carl Louis Gregory who had years of experience as a still and motion picture photographer. The role of the cameraman was uncredited in 1910 productions. Anna Rosemond, a leading lady of the company, played the key role of Pocahontas and Frank H. Crane, a leading male actor, played the role of John Rolfe. George Barnes was cast in the role of Captain John Smith and it marked his first known credited Thanhouser appearance. Barnes played the role of the bandit who shot Broncho Billy in Edwin S. Porter's The Great Train Robbery. The rest of the cast credits are unknown, but many 1910 Thanhouser productions are fragmentary listings. In late 1910, the Thanhouser company released a list of the important personalities in their films. The list includes G.W. Abbe, Justus D. Barnes, Irene Crane, Marie Eline, Violet Heming, Martin J. Faust, Thomas Fortune, George Middleton, Grace Moore, John W. Noble, Mrs. George Walters. According to a reviewer of the film, the cast included real Native Americans.

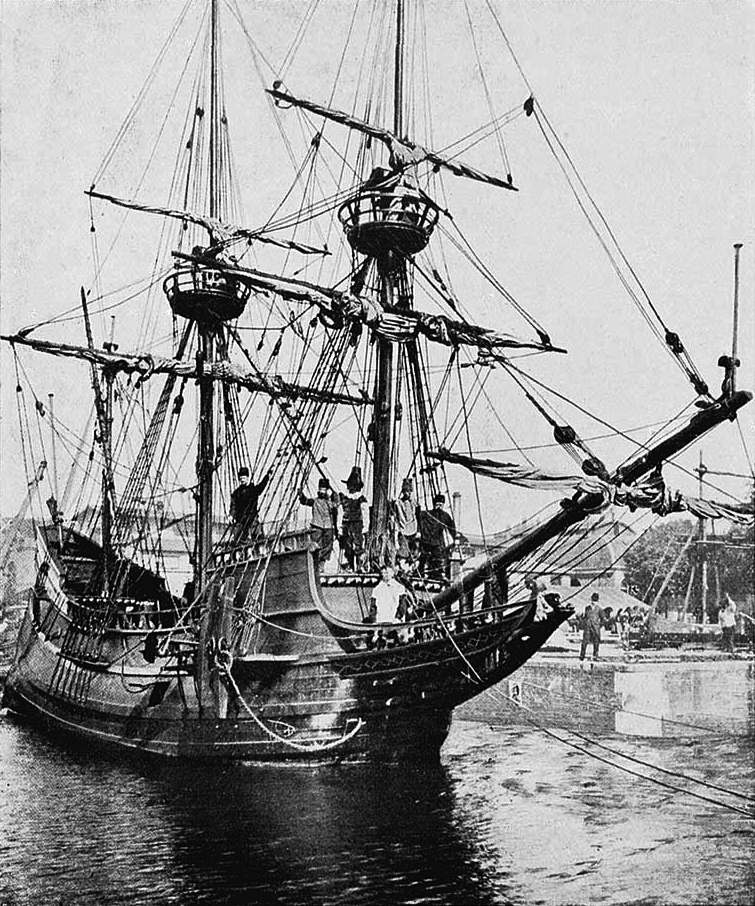
1909 Replica of Halve Maen

It is believed that a reproduction of Hendrik Hudson's ship, Halve Maen (English:Half Moon), was used in the film. The replica was originally constructed for the Hudson-Fulton Celebration in 1909. This belief comes from the identification of the vessel by The New York Dramatic Mirror reviewer who states, "One scene shows the copy of Henry Hudson's vessel used in the Hudson-Fulton celebration, and it is supposed in the film to represent the ship that brought John Smith and his party to America." Another reviewer from The Moving Picture World confirms the usage in the production: "We all know the story, but it was left for this enterprising concern to show us John Smith landing from the Half Moon, which was borrowed for the occasion. This occurs at the very beginning and gives the film a stamp of reality that seldom has been obtained in any historical subject." One flaw in the production was the scene in which Pocahontas appears in the court of King James and the setting draws attention over the action itself. The lack of a throne and unusual shaped windows, likened to those of a conservatory or enclosed veranda by the reviewer, diminishing the effect of the short scene.

== Release and reception ==
The single reel drama, approximately 1,000 feet long, was released on October 11, 1910. The film likely had a wide national release, with known showings in North Carolina, Indiana, Montana, and Kansas.

The film was widely praised by supporters of the Independents and minimally praised by the reviewer for The New York Dramatic Mirror which was chiefly loyal to the Licensed companies. A review in The Moving Picture News stated, "Never did any Licensed manufacturer turn out a better picture, and seldom have they turned out one that's equal. The details, the settings, the staging and the acting, not neglecting the photography, put this picture way above par." Walton, also of The Moving Picture News affirmed that the quality of the film, but acknowledged some minor historical accuracy points in the production itself. Walton concluded, "Such films as these lift moving picturedom into the higher plane, where its most enduring successes will be won. The presentation, in such a worthy form as this, of the timber from whence our nation has been hewn, cannot but meet with commendation. I feel sure England will welcome this stately production with as hearty a welcome as it has received, and merited, in New York." The Moving Picture World also confirmed the quality of the production as one which further elevates the reputation of the Thanhouser Company.

Standing in contrast, The New York Dramatic Mirror review criticized the production for being "too crowded for pictorial beauty and too stiffly acted for dramatic effect. The picture, therefore, falls short of the mark aimed at, although it is not unworthy of some praise. ... There are a number of flaws in the costuming that should not go unnoticed -- the cloth trousers worn by some of the Indians, the iron hatchets carried by at least two of them, the corsets and tailor-made fancy Indian costume worn by Pocahontas." The Mirror however was not impartial and was seen as an organ of the Licensed films. Despite this, the reviews were perceptive and were usually favorable to Thanhouser productions. (Note: The review by The New York Dramatic Mirror was published on October 19, 1910, after a positive review by a writer who had seen an advance print of the film at the Thanhouser Studio. This review was published in the October 8, 1910 edition of the Moving Picture News and it praised the use of the replica and the costuming. Though the reviewer added a dash of criticism, the Mirror reviewer seemed inclined to attack the points of praise made by the first reviewer.)

== See also ==
- List of American films of 1910
