= The Mermaid (1910 film) =

- Produced by: Thanhouser Company
- Distributed by: Thanhouser Film Corporation
- Release date: July 29, 1910
- Country: United States
- Languages: Silent film English intertitles

The Mermaid is a 1910 American silent short comedy produced by the Thanhouser Company. The film focuses on John Gary, a hotel owner, who wants to revitalize his business. After reading about a reported mermaid sighting, he has his daughter Ethel pose as a mermaid and gets a newspaper reporter to witness and photograph the mermaid. The publicity results in the hotel becoming famous, but Ethel eventually discloses the joke to the guests of the hotel in her mermaid suit. The film was released on July 29, 1910 and was met with mostly positive reviews. The film is presumed lost.

== Plot ==
Though the film is presumed lost, a synopsis survives in The Moving Picture World from July 30, 1910. It states: "John Gary runs a summer hotel at a charming spot on the seashore, but he has been unable to induce people to stop there, and at the opening of the picture he is seen lamenting the fact that there is not a single guest name on his hotel register. At this juncture his daughter Ethel returns from school. Ethel is an expert swimmer, and on reading in the paper the rumor that a mermaid has made several appearances in the water of the Atlantic, he decides to have his daughter pose as the mysterious lady of the sea. He wisely conjectures that a handy mermaid will bring guests. With Ethel clad in appropriate costume, and seated upon the rocks in true mermaid fashion, her father persuades the reporter of the local paper to take a look at the phenomenon. The newspaper man is greatly impressed with the spectacle and obtains a photo of the mermaid, which he publishes. The mermaid gains wide publicity and vacationists arrive from near and far to see her. Tom, Dick and Harry, a trio of city sports, jump into bathing suits and the water, each bent on capturing the mermaid. She eludes them all, however, and the mystery is not cleared up until Ethel, in a pre-tailored suit, presents herself to the guests and explains the joke. By this time Gary's hotel is famous and the owner is certain of a big summer business."

== Cast ==
- Violet Heming as Ethel Gary
- Frank H. Crane as John Gary
- Marie Eline

== Production ==
The writer of the scenario is unknown, but it was most likely Lloyd Lonergan. He was an experienced newspaperman employed by The New York Evening World while writing scripts for the Thanhouser productions. The film director is unknown, but it may have been Barry O'Neil. Film historian Q. David Bowers does not attribute a cameraman for this production, but at least two possible candidates exist. Blair Smith was the first cameraman of the Thanhouser company, but he was soon joined by Carl Louis Gregory who had years of experience as a still and motion picture photographer. The role of the cameraman was uncredited in 1910 productions. The Moving Picture World announced that the film would feature Heming and Crane, but Bowers also credits the "Thanhouser Kid" Marie Eline in an unknown role. It is unknown, but possible, that Eline may have played the role of the young boy usher. By this time, Eline had proven herself capable of handling male characters, with the first such credit as a young Italian boy in The Two Roses. Eline would also star as Hans in The Little Hero of Holland. It is unknown if Anna Rosemond, the other leading lady of Thanhouser, had a role in this film.

As reviewers would note, the production was not without its faults. One error occurred with the photographer improperly taking pictures of the mermaid. The developed photographs of the mermaid were also impossible given the distances involved. A more minor error in the operation of the hotel was given by the office boy who handled the arriving guests with remarkable speed. Despite these errors, the company was at the forefront of the Independent producers and given great praise by Frank E. Woods of the American Biograph Company in The New York Dramatic Mirror.

== Release and reception ==
The one reel comedy, approximately 1000 feet long, was released on July 29, 1910. The film likely had a wide release, but another film of the same name was released by Società Anonima Ambrosio. The Ambrosio film was released on November 16, 1910, but several theater advertisements are ambiguous as to the film being shown. It is known that Ambroiso and Thanhouser films were sometimes shown together, as one Maryland theater advertisement shows, further complicating identification. (Note: Numerous advertisements exist that indicate a film bearing this name being shown, but few unambiguously provide the producer credit. The Ambrosio credit in one Marvel advertisement exists and a Vaudet advertisement indicates Thanhouser, but these are exceptions. One Advertisements in Arizona leans towards the Thanhouser production with comedy reference. One advertisement The Wenatchee Daily World apparently is for the Thanhouser film because it pre-dates the Ambrosio release.) The film received mainly positive reviews from critics. The Morning Telegraph found the story to have a novel way of advertising a hotel, but noted the error in the photographer's attempt and result to photograph the mermaid. The Moving Picture World found the film to be an effective production, but spared few details and a short summary of the film. The most critical review came from The New York Dramatic Mirror which was neutral in its assessment of the production, but it provided a list of faults with the production that focused on continuity issues with action.

== See also ==
- List of American films of 1910
