= Dots and Dashes =

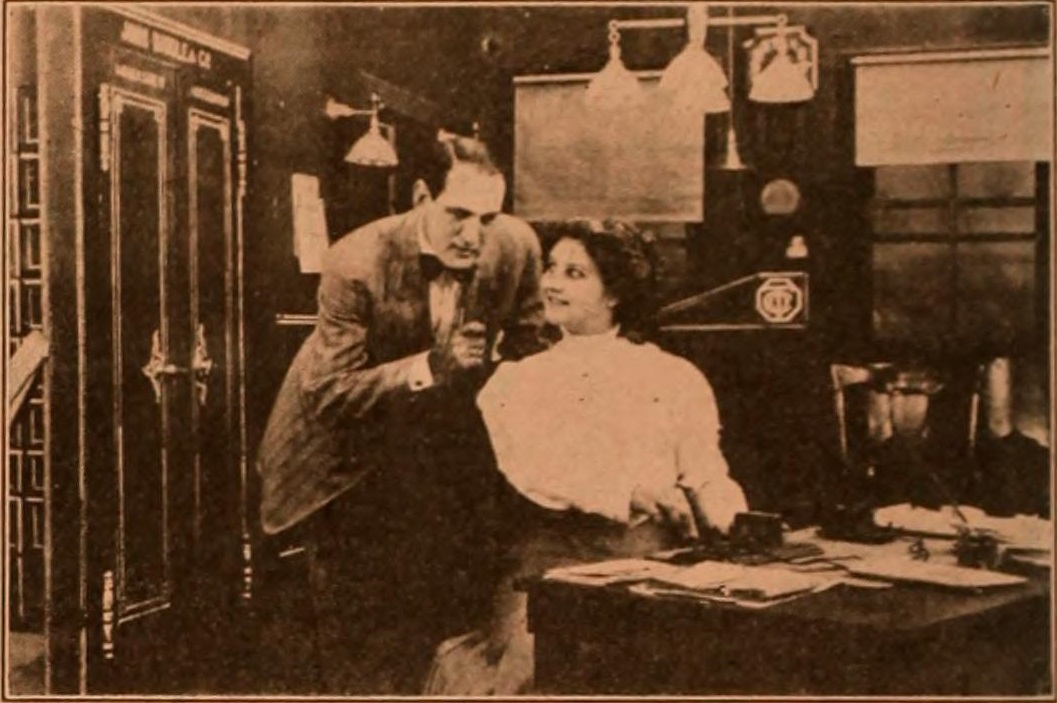
- A surviving film still
- Produced by: Thanhouser Company
- Distributed by: Motion Picture Distributing and Sales Company
- Release date: September 30, 1910
- Country: United States
- Languages: Silent film English intertitles

Dots and Dashes is a 1910 American silent short drama produced by the Thanhouser Company. May Wilson is a telegraph operator and Jack Wilson is the head bookkeeper of the brokerage office. May teaches Jack how to use Morse code. At the end of the day is called to into the office and learns that something is wrong with the books and he quickly finds the guilty party and confronts him. While he leans into the safe, Bill pushes him inside and locks the safe before fleeing. May, who is waiting for Jack, goes to the office and searches for him. Hearing groans from the safe, she knows he is in danger and uses Morse code to learn the combination and free him. Later, Bill returns to the scene to see if Jack is dead. As he opens the door, the police pop out of the safe and arrest him. The film was released on September 30, 1910 and was met with mixed reviews for the improbable plot and the inaccurate Morse code being tapped out on screen. The film is presumed lost.

== Plot ==
Though the film is presumed lost, a synopsis survives in The Moving Picture World from October 1, 1910. It states: "May Wilson and Jack Preston are employed at a downtown brokerage office, she as telegraph operator of the private wire of the firm, and he as head bookkeeper. The young people are fond of each other, and at the opening of the play have just made an engagement to spend the evening in each other's company at one of the theatres. May has been teaching Jack mysteries of the Morse code and is greatly pleased when she finds that he has so far mastered it as to be able to rap back an answer to her messages. After May has left the office for the day, the head of the firm calls Jack into his private office and there confides to him that there is something wrong with the books of the concern, and tells Jack to investigate. On looking into the matter, Jack discovers that his fellow worker, Carson, is the defaulter, and accuses him to his face. Alone in the office, Carson begs Jack to shield him, while Jack insists that he must make their employer conversant with the facts. As Jack leans far into the large safe to deposit the ledgers of the firm, Bill thrusts him inside, and turning the knob entombs him alive in the steel prison. Trembling with fear at his act, Bill steals cautiously from the office."

"May, becoming impatient when theatre time arrives and Jack fails to call for her, decides that he must still be working at the office, forgetful of the lateness of the hour. She proceeds to the office to remind him of his appointment, and finding it deserted, she is about to leave, when muffled groans reach her from the safe. She realizes that it must be her sweetheart who is imprisoned, and that unless she can free him in short order, he will surely die of suffocation. Not knowing the combination of the safe, and being unable to reach by telephone her employer, she suddenly conceives the idea that if by telegraphic signal she can make known to the man in the safe that she is there, trying to help him, he in his turn can in the same code give her the combination of the safe. This plan works out successfully, the two lovers tapping out their messages against the steel sides of the safe. The door of the safe finally yields to the combination, and Jack's apparently lifeless body rolls to the floor of the office. May revives him, and amid tears and laughter they rejoice over Jack's narrow escape. Haunted by the fear of what he has done, Bill creeps stealthily back into the office, opens the door of the safe, impelled to learn its horrible secret. As the door opens he is confronted by two officers of the law, who place him under arrest."

== Cast ==
- Anna Rosemond as May Wilson

The credits for Jack Preston and Bill, amongst the other minor roles of the manager and the police are unknown.

== Production ==
The writer of the scenario was Lloyd Lonergan, who was an experienced newspaperman employed by The New York Evening World while he was writing scripts for the Thanhouser productions. The film director is unknown, but it may have been Barry O'Neil. Film historian Q. David Bowers does not attribute a cameraman for this production, but at least two possible candidates exist. Blair Smith was the first cameraman of the Thanhouser company, but he was soon joined by Carl Louis Gregory who had years of experience as a still and motion picture photographer. The role of the cameraman was uncredited in 1910 productions. The only one credit is known and that is Anna Rosemond as May Wilson. The rest of the credits are unknown and like other productions are fragmentary. In late 1910, the Thanhouser company released a list of the important personalities in their films. The list includes G.W. Abbe, Justus D. Barnes, Frank H. Crane, Irene Crane, Marie Eline, Violet Heming, Martin J. Faust, Thomas Fortune, George Middleton, Grace Moore, John W. Noble, Anna Rosemond, Mrs. George Walters. A surviving film still gives the possibility of identifying one other actor.

The actual Morse code being tapped out did not match what was actually being said according to Walton of The Moving Picture News. Another reviewer wrote, "It is rather to be regretted that the Thanhouser people did not make the most of this climax by introducing telegraphic dots and dashes in a manner to create suspense. By this is meant that had a few lines of dots and dashes been flashed on the screen, word by word, and with each word spelled out in letters beneath each dot and dash, it would have given a telegraphic semblance or realism to the scene." This film was an early example of the use of the character names Jack and May, which were to be repeatedly used by Lonergan in various productions. Bowers writes, "It developed that Lloyd F. Lonergan, who wrote the scenario, liked these names, and during the years to come used them again and again. One can imagine that it must have become a studio joke to decide who was to play Jack and who was to play May. In actuality, names such as Jack and May were used in printed synopses to keep track of who was who, but such names were usually not mentioned in the film's subtitles. Patrons watching the picture in a theatre had not the foggiest idea whether the hero was named Jack, Bertram, or Ezekiel." Previously, May had been a name used by Marie Eline in The Best Man Wins and Jack had been used in The Writing on the Wall by an unknown actor.

== Release and reception ==
The single-reel drama, approximately 950 feet long, was released on September 30, 1910. The film had a wide national release, with advertising theaters known in Washington, Pennsylvania, Arizona, South Dakota, and Kansas. The film was released in Britain on December 18, 1910.

The New York Dramatic Mirror reviewer stated, "The story is clear and interesting, and the acting is excellent. Perhaps the best actress of the lot is the vivacious scrubwoman, although she has the easy comic role. Good as the acting is, it does not cover up several improbabilities in the plot. It takes the hero a marvelously short time to find out who has been tampering with the books of the company, and he foolishly lets the villain lock the vault doors upon him. A real girl would never have set out to find her escort to the theatre, even if he was late; least of all would she have gone unchaperoned to the office at night. The villain would not have returned to discover the fate of the hero; he would lose no time in getting miles away from the scene of his crime. Dots and Dashes is well mounted." Aside from these "improbabilities" Walton of The Moving Picture News praised the film and the story after being critical of Morse code tapping being not accurate. Walton wrote, "The general public - excluding such cranks as I am - will enjoy your honest work." A reviewer for The Moving Picture World, who saw the film at the studio, also praised the film and its climax.

== See also ==
- List of American films of 1910
