= The Girls of the Ghetto =

1910 American silent short film

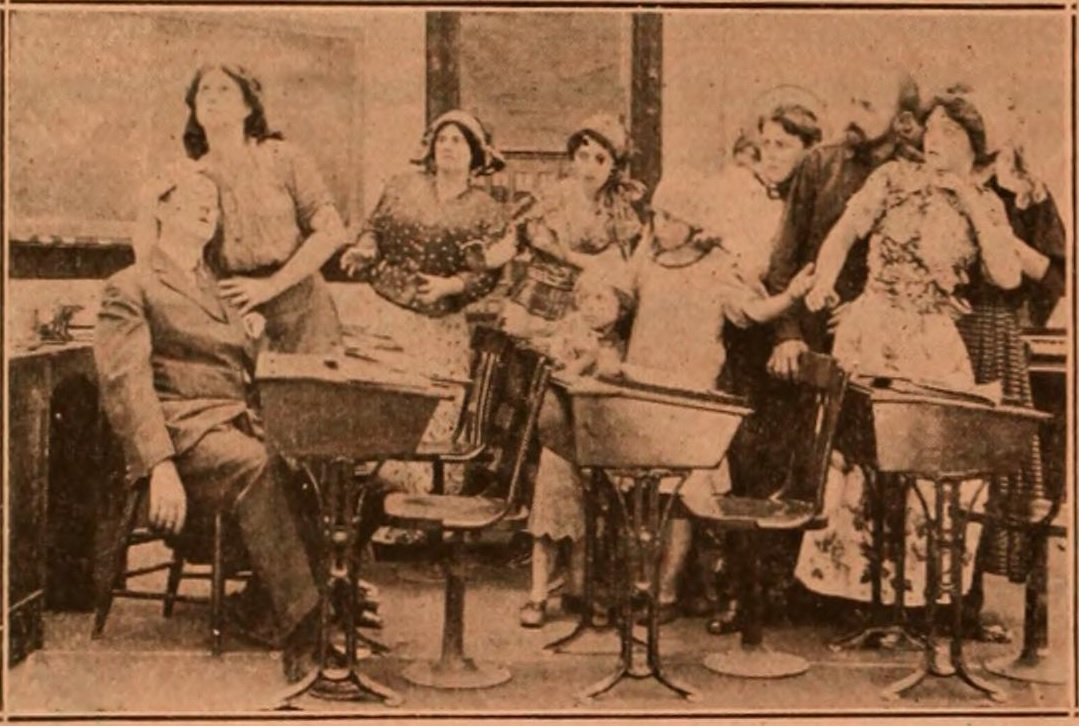
- A surviving film still
- Production company: Thanhouser Company
- Release date: July 19, 1910
- Country: United States
- Languages: Silent film English inter-titles

The Girls of the Ghetto is a 1910 American silent short drama film produced by the Thanhouser Company. The film focuses on Bella, who works in a sweatshop and save enough money to have her little sisters emigrate to New York. John Magie encounters one of the girls and urges to attend classes. During an outbreak of fever, John is suddenly taken ill and Bella nurses him back to health. At the time of its production, the term "ghetto" was a buzzword and the focus of the hardworking Jewess struggling to survive was a focus of other 1910 productions. The film was released on July 19, 1910, and received criticism for not having the character appear to be Jewish and incorrectly portraying her place of work as a sweatshop. The film is presumed lost.

== Plot ==
Though the film is presumed lost, a synopsis survives in The Moving Picture World from July 23, 1910. It states: "Bella is an immigrant girl doing sweatshop work in the ghetto of a great city. But by saving for some time, she manages to get enough money to send to the old country for her two little sisters. She meets them at Ellis Island and escorts them across Battery Park to their new home. The three girls live with an uncle and aunt in one poor room in a tenement. The smallest of the sisters while playing on the sidewalk one day gets lost and suddenly finds herself in Chinatown. She is dismayed at the entirely strange surroundings, and is weeping bitterly when found by John Magie, a young settlement worker. He dries her tears and takes her safely to her sweatshop home. John is at once attracted by Bella, whom he meets for the first time when he brings the little one back. He does the family many little kindnesses, bringing them flowers and books, and induces the girls to attend the classes at the settlement. While teaching his class one evening, John is suddenly attacked with a fever, which is epidemic at that time. All his pupils flee from him in fear, except Bella, who remains and nurses him back to health. Upon his recovery John makes Bella his wife and they take up together the work of bringing knowledge and happiness to the poor of the East Side [of New York City]."

== Cast ==
- Marie Eline as an immigrant's child
- Anna Rosemond

== Production ==
The writer of the scenario is unknown, but it was most likely Lloyd Lonergan. Lonergan was an experienced newspaperman employed by The New York Evening World while writing scripts for the Thanhouser productions. J. Hoberman, author of Bridge of Light: Yiddish Film Between Two Worlds, writes that the Lower East Side had reached a total population of 540,000 and the world "ghetto" became a buzzword. Other 1910 films on the subject included Yankee's The Ghetto Seamstress and D. W. Griffith's A Child of the Ghetto. Patricia Erens, author of The Jew in American Cinema says these films highlight the hard-working Jewess in melodramatic situations that are only resolved with improbable solutions. The setting for the film included scenes in Manhattan's Chinatown and was advertised as "a study of settlement conditions in the great East Side of New York City. It was produced right in the heart of the ghetto to assure a faithful presentation of East Side localities and life. Representatives of all races and nationalities pass through the picture, from the slow-stepping Russian to the gliding Chinee." Some of the details of the production were recorded due to the flaws in the depicting a sweatshop and the fact the Hebrew characters are not recognizable as Hebrews.

The film director and the cameraman are unknown, but the "Thanhouser Kid" Marie Eline and Anna Rosemond are known credits. Members cast may have included the leading players of the Thanhouser productions Frank H. Crane and Violet Heming. Despite the lack of production details, the quality of the Thanhouser films in general stood out amongst the Independent producers. An editorial by "The Spectator" in The New York Dramatic Mirror contained specific praise for Thanhouser productions by stating, "...practically all other Independent American companies, excepting Thanhouser, show haste and lack of thought in their production. Crude stories are crudely handled, giving the impression that they are rushed through in a hurry - anything to get a thousand feet of negative ready for the market. Such pictures, of course, do not cost much to produce, but they are not of a class to make reputation. The Thanhouser company, alone of the Independents, shows a consistent effort to do things worthwhile..." The editorial warned that American audiences were not subject to be entertained by the novelty of moving images and cautioned the Independents that there was distinct danger in quantity over quality. The editorial was written by Frank E. Woods of the American Biograph Company, a Licensed company, and like the publication itself had a considerable slant to the Licensed companies.

== Release and reception ==
The single reel drama, approximately 1000 feet long, was released on July 19, 1910. The film had a wide national release with known advertisements by theaters found in Indiana, Nebraska, Missouri, Pennsylvania, North Carolina, and Texas.

This production was met with negative attention by film critics. A reviewer in The Moving Picture News wrote, "There isn't a lot to the story, but the acting is of the class which still finds favor with the public. The pictures taken in Chinatown do not go quite far enough in depicting East Side conditions; the photography of these particular scenes is not the ideal of Thanhouser productions..." The New York Dramatic Mirror was more moderate in its criticism by identifying specific faults with the portrayal, but found that the story to be good and the parts well-acted. The Morning Telegraph offered similar criticism, "The story of this picture is fairly good, but the details are wrong. In the first place, the producers evidently never were in a sweatshop, or else they would not have representing a sweatshop a store like a custom tailor shop, doing a thriving business. The people who are supposed to be Hebrews hardly resemble them. The next objection is when the settlement worker falls into a faint, the girl is very slow in picking him up. The story tells of a poor immigrant Hebrew girl who falls in love with a settlement worker, who returns her affection, which finally results in their marriage." Some advertisements would bill the production as seeing the other side of New York City life.

== See also ==
- List of American films of 1910
