= The Flag of His Country =

1910 silent film

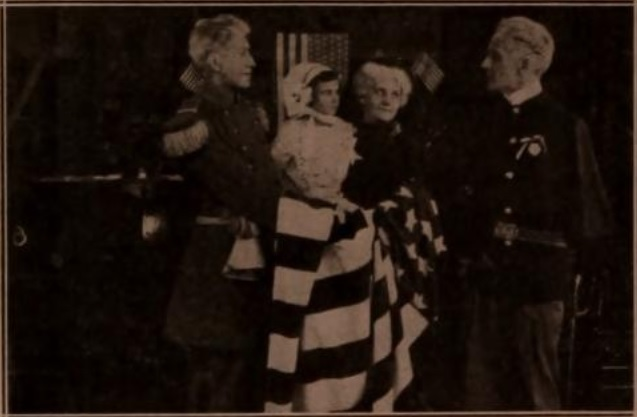
- An image still of the film.
- Produced by: Thanhouser Company
- Release date: July 1, 1910
- Country: United States
- Languages: Silent film English intertitles

The Flag of His Country is a 1910 American silent short drama film produced by the Thanhouser Company. The patriotic film focuses on a man aptly named Walter North who sides with the Union in the American Civil War, while his wife sides with the Confederacy. The family is reunited thirty years later at a Grand Army of the Republic reunion through the actions of their grandchild. Little is known about the production and cast of the film, but the role of granddaughter was played by Marie Eline. Released on July 1, 1910, the film took place within living memory of the war and a reviewer in The Moving Picture World noted that the film would not offend its audience members. The film is presumed lost.

== Plot ==
Though the film is presumed lost, a synopsis survives in The Moving Picture World from July 2, 1910. It states: "Walter North is a New York man, married to a Southern girl. At the opening of the play their baby daughter is christened, and the young couple is living happily in their home in Baltimore. This is in 1861, the opening of the Civil War. At the first rumors of hostilities, Mrs. North's brother enlisted in the ranks of the Confederacy. When North refuses to follow his example, and casts his lot with the Union army, his wife bids him good-bye forever. She asked him to choose between his flag and her. He salutes Old Glory, and goes to war. Four years later when he returns he finds his old home deserted, and although he tries in every way to discover the whereabouts of his wife and child he is unsuccessful. He moves to a northern home and there becomes commander of a Grand Army of the Republic post. Mrs. North, who believed that her husband was killed in the war, comes North with her brother and her little grandchild to attend the reunion of the Confederate veterans and the Grand Army of the Republic. While out working with her grandmother, the little girl is lost, and is picked up by North on his way to attend the reunion. Through the police the grandmother and uncle are notified of the whereabouts of the child, and when they come to claim her at the Grand Army of the Republic post, there are mutual recognitions, and Mr. and Mrs. North are reunited. There is but one flag now, the blue and the gray clasp hands beneath its folds."

== Production ==
The writer of the scenario is unknown, but it was most likely Lloyd Lonergan. Lonergan was an experienced newspaperman employed by The New York Evening World while writing scripts for the Thanhouser productions. He was the most important script writer for Thanhouser, averaging 200 scripts a year from 1910 to 1915. The film director is unknown, but it may have been Barry O'Neil. Bowers does not attribute a cameraman for this production, but two possible candidates exist. Blair Smith was the first cameraman of the Thanhouser company, but he was soon joined by Carl Louis Gregory who had years of experience as a still and motion picture photographer. The role of the cameraman was uncredited in 1910 productions. The only credit known for the cast is that of Marie Eline in the role of the granddaughter. Other members cast may have included the other leading players of the Thanhouser productions, Anna Rosemond, Frank H. Crane and Violet Heming. Bowers states that most of the credits are fragmentary for 1910 Thanhouser productions.

== Release ==
The single reel drama, approximately 1,000 feet long, was released on July 1, 1910. An article in The Moving Picture World gave a positive review, but recognized that the tensions amongst the Union and Confederate states of the Civil War could pose a concern for viewers and stated that no offense will come from the showing of this patriotic picture. The reviewer said that it would please American audiences and foreign ones as well. This possibility of an audience taking offense over the content of the picture was a reasonable one because the film was within living memory. The movement and influence of members in the Grand Army of the Republic was strong and memberships still exceeded 200,000 persons in 1910. A review by The New York Dramatic Mirror stated, "This is a sure enough 'classy' picture, full of human feeling and good acting. It is one of the kind that is giving the Thanhouser people the fine reputation they are gaining. ... The picture is strongly effective." One advertisement billed the film as a patriotic masterpiece and would have musical accompaniment by the vaudeville musician Etta Hyland.

== See also ==
- List of American films of 1910
