= Rip Van Winkle (1910 film) =

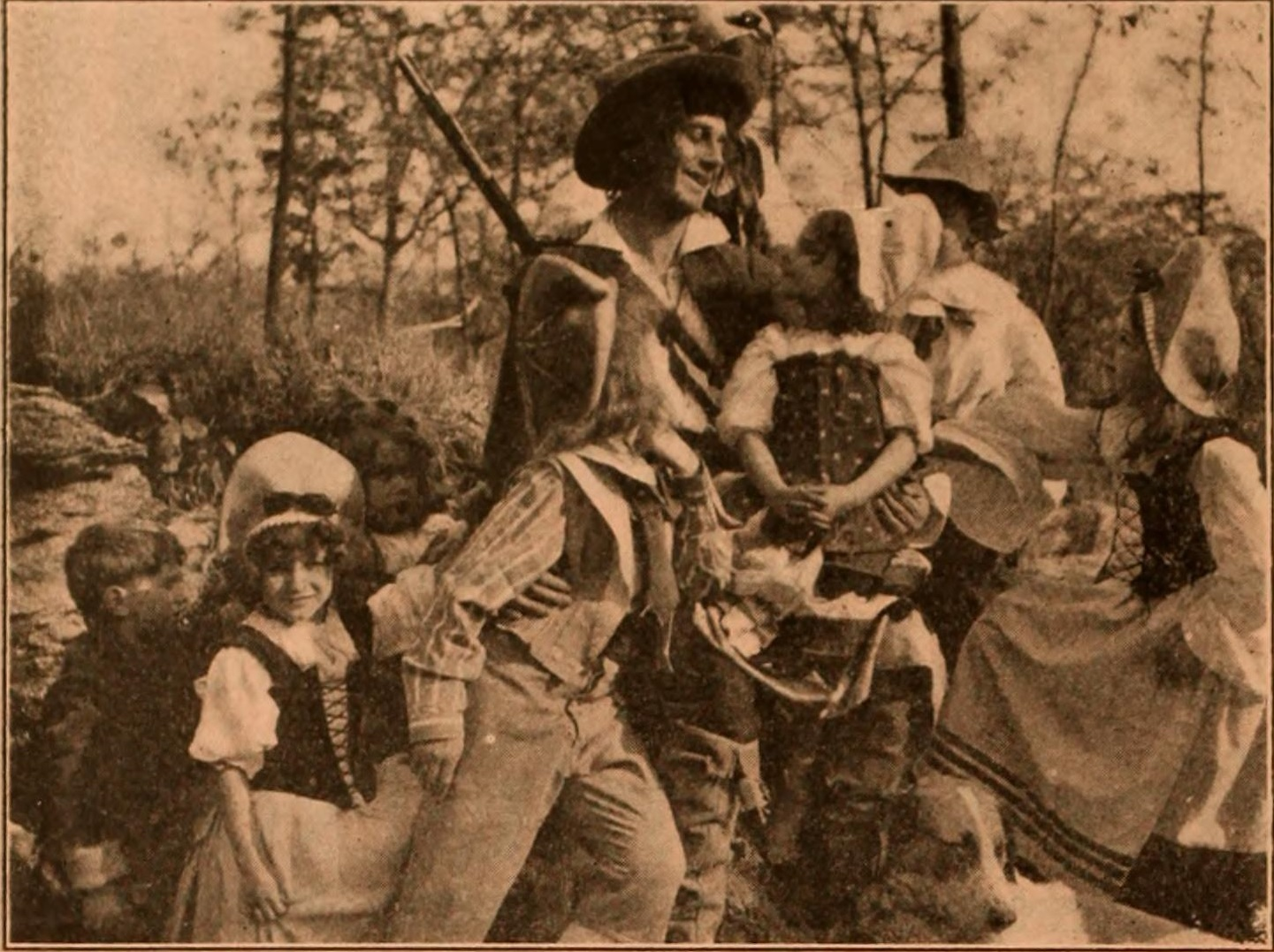
- A film still showing the young Rip Van Winkle
- Based on: Rip Van Winkle by Washington Irving
- Produced by: Thanhouser Company
- Distributed by: Motion Picture Distributing and Sales Company
- Release date: December 6, 1910
- Running time: 1 reel
- Country: United States
- Language: Silent (English intertitles)

Rip Van Winkle is a 1910 American silent short drama film produced by the Thanhouser Company. The film is an adaptation of Washington Irving's 1819 short story "Rip Van Winkle" with some differences in the plot. The film focuses on the title character whose idle life is made difficult by his cantankerous wife. Winkle heads into the mountains and encounters spirits of Henry Hudson's men. Upon partaking of their alcohol, Winkle falls into a slumber for twenty years. He returns home and has difficulty proving his identity and must save his property from an unlawful accusation by his rival. After he proves his identity, he is reunited with his family. The title character was played by Frank H. Crane, but the production credits are largely unknown. The film was released on December 6, 1910, and met with positive reviews. The film is presumed lost.

== Plot ==
Though the film is presumed lost, a synopsis survives in The Moving Picture World from December 10, 1910. It states: "Rip Van Winkle, although a loving father to his little girl Meenie and a hail-fellow-well-met with all of his fellow townsmen, is being constantly scolded by his wife for leading an idle and profitless existence. Rip is also fond of the bottle and spends a greater part of his time and money at the village tavern. Catching him entering the house late one night after a day's carousing, his wife Gretchen becomes thoroughly angry with him and drives him from the house. In the face of a terrible storm with only his dog Schneider and his faithful rifle to protect him, Rip wanders toward the mountains. Here he comes across a band of gnomes who are supposed to be the spirits of Heinrich Hudson [sic] and his merry men who disappeared near the Catskill Mountains hundreds of years before, and had never been heard of since. The gnomes give Rip some magic schnapps to drink, and under its influence he goes to sleep for 20 years. When he awakes, he is an old man and in ragged clothes. His dog is dead, and his rifle has rusted away. He makes his way as best he can back to the village, and his own home. But there no one knows him. He finds his wife married to another man, his daughter grown to womanhood, and most of his old friends dead and gone. Rip, however, finally manages to prove his identity, and also to lay claim to his property, which has greatly increased in value during his sleep, in which he is just in time to save from being unlawfully confiscated by his old-time enemy. Happily reunited to his family, Rip looks forward to his declining years with a spirit born of peace and solace."

== Cast ==
- Frank H. Crane as Rip Van Winkle
- Marie Eline

== Production ==
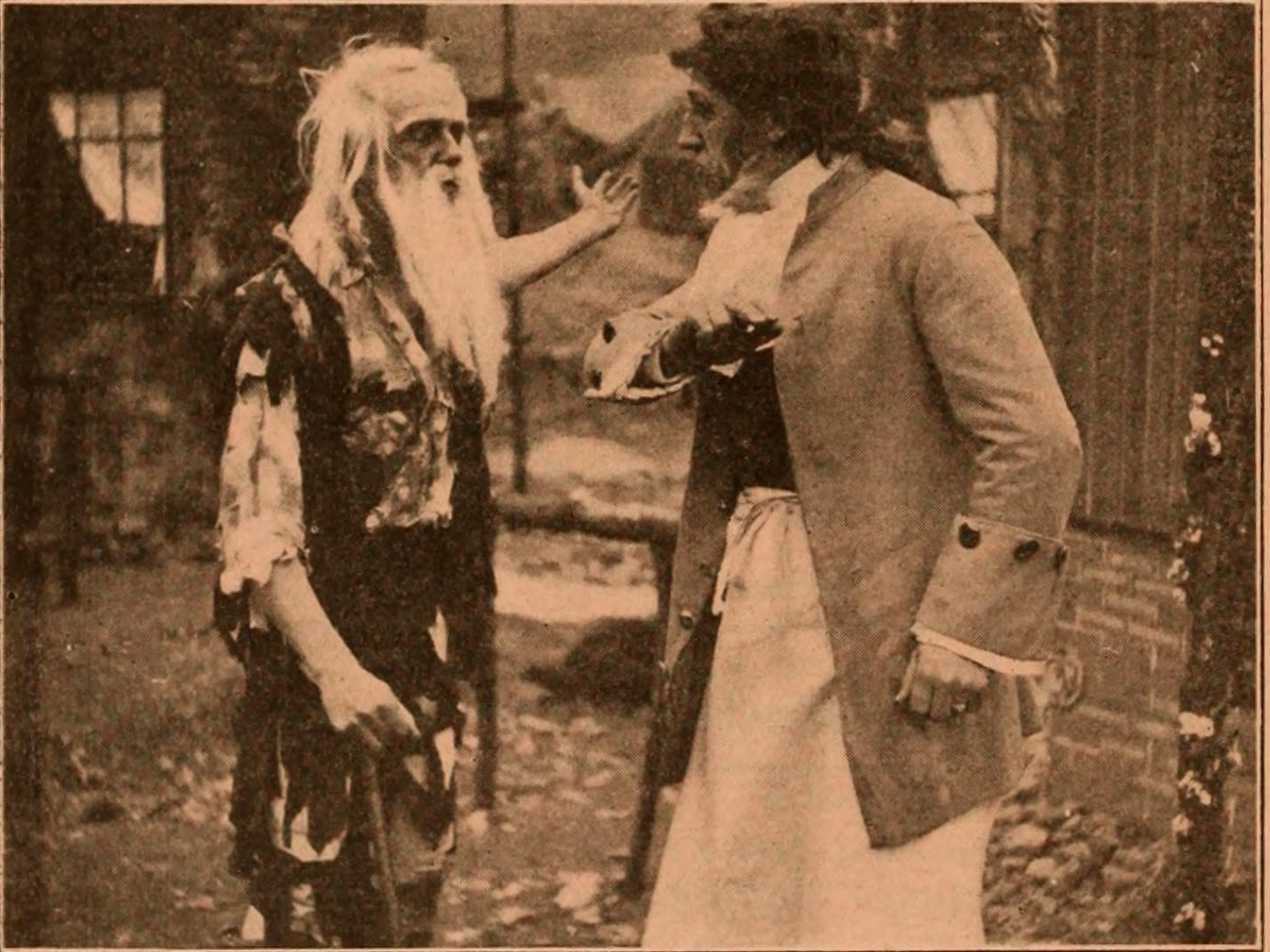
Rip Van Winkle (left) after his twenty year sleep.

The production and an adaptation of Washington Irving's story of Rip Van Winkle. The stage adaptation was well-known and the adaptation would be compared to Joseph Jefferson's portrayal on the stage. The writer of the scenario is unknown, but it was most likely Lloyd Lonergan. He was an experienced newspaperman employed by The New York Evening World while writing scripts for the Thanhouser productions. The adaptation differs from the original in some ways, including that Winkle's cantankerous wife has remarried instead of died.

The film director is unknown, but it may have been Barry O'Neil or Lucius J. Henderson. Sometimes the directional credit is given to Theodore Marston. The apparent origin of this error is from the American Film-Index 1908–1915. Film historian Q. David Bowers consulted one of the co-authors of the book, Gunnar Lundquist, and confirmed that the credit of Marston was in error. Theodore Marston worked with Pathé, Kinemacolor of America, Vitagraph and other companies, but there is no record of Marston working with Thanhouser. This error has persisted in several works including The Complete Index to Literary Sources in Film. The same work also credits Alphonse Ethier with a role, but this is not cited by Bowers.

The only known cast credits are for Frank H. Crane and Marie Eline. The other cast credits are unknown, but many 1910 Thanhouser productions are fragmentary. (Note: Bowers refers to a note in the estate of Carl Gregory that states "Frank McQuade, Sr." played the role of Rip Van Winkle. This would appear to be erroneous because Robert McWade (sometimes stylized Robert McQuade) did play Rip Van Winkle, but it was the 1912 Vitagraph production. Bowers does not cite a Frank McQuade in the biography listing for the company and the film stills show Frank Crane as Rip Van Winkle.) In late 1910, the Thanhouser company released a list of the important personalities in their films. The list included G.W. Abbe, Justus D. Barnes, Frank H. Crane, Irene Crane, Marie Eline, Violet Heming, Martin J. Faust, Thomas Fortune, George Middleton, Grace Moore, John W. Noble, Anna Rosemond, Mrs. George Walters.

== Release and reception ==
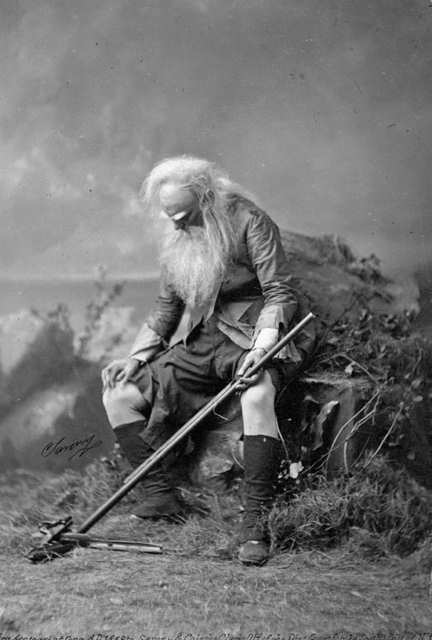
Joseph Jefferson was an iconic figure known for his role as Rip Van Winkle.

The single reel drama, approximately 1,000 feet long, was released on December 6, 1910. The film had a wide national release, advertising theaters for the Thanhouser film include those in Pennsylvania, South Dakota, Kansas, and Indiana.

The film received positive reviews in trade publications. The Moving Picture World review said. "Probably the story of Rip Van Winkle as told by Washington Irving will always be a delight. Surely the Rip Van Winkle, as depicted by the late Joseph Jefferson, will linger long in the memory of those fortunate enough to have seen it. Unquestionably, however, the third in the list of delights is this film from Thanhouser which tells the story over again in much the same way that Jefferson told it. The Rip of Jefferson and the Rip of Irving are two different versions, though both do substantially the same things. ... It is a good piece of work from every standpoint. The actors have entered into the spirit of the story and have depicted it with close adherence to the facts as they are related in the original. The stage manager understood what was required to make the background appear natural, while the photographer handled the camera with full knowledge of the requirements." The New York Dramatic Mirror reviewer also agreed and commended the film by stating, "The Thanhouser Company has done very well with this old legend, paying particular attention to details. ... The acting is exceptionally good for a story representing that era of time, and the adaption is very clear to the spectator."

== See also ==
- List of American films of 1910
