= The Governor's Daughter =

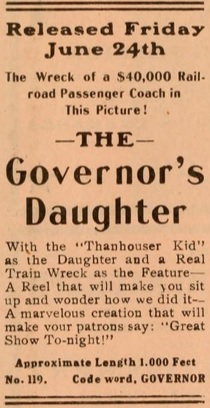
- An advertisement for the film
- Produced by: Thanhouser Company
- Starring: Marie Eline
- Release date: June 24, 1910
- Country: United States
- Languages: Silent film English inter-titles

The Governor's Daughter is a 1910 American silent short drama produced by the Thanhouser Company. The story details a convict who is being sent to prison when the train is wrecked and the sheriff escorting him is killed. The convict frees himself, but halts his escape to save the life of a little girl. As he returns the girl to her nurse, a policeman identifies and recaptures him. Later the little girl accompanies her father, the governor, on a tour of the prison and the father pardons the hero-convict. The film included scenes of a real train wreck and the scenario was written around the filming of the disaster. The film received praise for the before and after scenes which were described as shocking to The Moving Picture World's reviewer. The film was released on June 24, 1910, and was shown as far away as Australia. The film is presumed lost.

== Plot ==
Though the film is presumed lost, a synopsis survives in The Moving Picture World from June 25, 1910. It states: "Bill Raymond, a convict, sentenced to a long term, is on his way to prison, in custody of the sheriff. A little girl [Nell] is a passenger in the same train. She shows that she feels sorry for the man. He in turn appreciates her sympathy. The train is wrecked, and the sheriff, who is handcuffed to Bill, is killed. Bill takes the key of the handcuffs from the pocket of the dead man, frees himself, and is about to escape, when he notices that the little girl, abandoned by her nurse, is lying unconscious in the car, which is now on fire. The convict risks his life to save the child, and carries her out in his arms. He takes her to her nurse and is recognized by a policeman and taken in custody, his chance for freedom lost. The child, who is the daughter of the governor, although Bill does not know it, is restored to her parent. The nurse fears to mention the incident, and the governor does not know how his darling's life was saved. Later the governor goes to the state prison on a tour of inspection, and Nell accompanies him. She has some flowers which she wants to give to the prisoners. In her tour of the prison, she recognizes Bill. She tells her father about it, and he pardons the hero-convict on the spot...."

== Production ==
The impetus to produce this film appears to have been the ability of the Thanhouser crew to capture a disaster on film. Film historian Q. David Bowers writes, "What was one company's misfortune was another's gain, and from time to time during the next few years Thanhouser cameramen hurried to film scenes of disasters so that they could be featured as film episodes in scenarios which were written after the fact." It is unknown what particular rail disaster was filmed, but a possible that the accident depicted was in the Bronx on the night of June 1, 1910. That night one stalled train, concealed in smoke from a fire, was struck by another train near the Mott Avenue subway station. One of the composite cars was shredded by the steel cars behind it; there were no fatalities in the accident. Other accidents prior to the film debut occurred in January and February.

The writer of the scenario is unknown, but it was most likely Lloyd Lonergan. Lonergan was an experienced newspaperman employed by The New York Evening World while writing scripts for the Thanhouser productions. He was the most important script writer for Thanhouser, averaging 200 scripts a year from 1910 to 1915. The film director is unknown, but it may have been Barry O'Neil. Bowers does not attribute a cameraman for this production, but two possible candidates exist. Blair Smith was the first cameraman of the Thanhouser company, but he was soon joined by Carl Louis Gregory who had years of experience as a still and motion picture photographer. The role of the cameraman was uncredited in 1910 productions. The only credit known for the cast is that of Marie Eline as Nell. Other members cast may have included the leading players of the Thanhouser productions, Anna Rosemond and Frank H. Crane. Rosemond was one of two leading ladies for the first year of the company. Crane was also involved in the very beginnings of the Thanhouser Company and acted in numerous productions before becoming a director at Thanhouser.

== Release and reception ==
The single reel drama, approximately 985 feet long, was released on June 24, 1910. Advertisements played up the wreck of the $40,000 train car while a positive review in The Moving Picture World praised the well-managed production's prison and track wreck scenes, but remarked that the improbable story was purely fantastical. One of the more dramatic articles to appear in The Moving Picture World included reference to the film while playing up the dramatic element describe the footage and the filming of the wreck. It states: "... The scenes were portrayals of a train crash and they give you startling before-and-after wreck views. They made you shiver when they showed you the fate that came to a car full of passengers – sudden, cruel and without warning. They made you shiver; ... And you thanked God that the thing before you was only a picture on the screen!" Known advertisements for the film included theaters in Rhode Island and Indiana. Records show that film made it to Australia, with one Launceston, Tasmania newspaper showing an advertisement on January 30, 1911.

The film was still in circulation years after its production, with the Pennsylvania State Board of Censors of Moving Pictures approving this film for viewing without censorship in a May 21, 1915 decision. This list also records the existence of two films bearing the same name, one from Selig Polyscope and the other from the Éclair American Company.

== See also ==
- List of American films of 1910
