= The Best Man Wins (1910 film) =

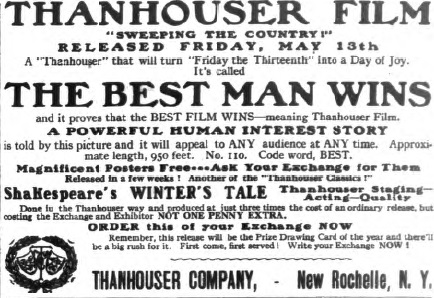
- An advertisement for the film in The New York Dramatic Mirror
- Starring: Anna Rosemond; Martin Faust; Frank H. Crane; Marie Eline
- Production company: Thanhouser Company
- Distributed by: Thanhouser Company
- Release date: May 13, 1910
- Country: United States
- Languages: Silent film (English intertitles)

The Best Man Wins is a 1910 American silent short drama produced by the Thanhouser Company. The film features Thanhouser's leading players Anna Rosemond, Martin Faust, Frank H. Crane and Marie Eline in a drama about morality. Two suitors are vying for the hand of Julia Seaton and propose to her on the same day, but she asks for a month to decide between them. In the time, the caliber of both men are tested when asked by a young girl, named May, to help her dying mother. The doctor refuses to help, and the lawyer offers his assistance, but her mother soon dies. The orphan is taken in by the Seaton family and personally attests to the character of both men when Julia Seaton has to choose between her suitors.

The writer, director, and cameraman are unknown. Released on May 14, 1910, the film was met with mostly positive reviews by critics. The film is presumed lost.

== Plot ==
Though the film is presumed lost, a surviving synopsis was published in The Moving Picture World. It states: "Julia Seaton, a rich heiress, has two suitors, Dr. John Seymour, a wealthy physician, and Richard Calhoun, a poor lawyer. They both propose in the same evening, but while inclined to prefer John, Julia has not yet made a definite choice, and tells both to come back in a month for their answer. The scene shifts to the squalid home of the charwoman, Mrs. Smith, who, ill in bed and unable to earn the rent money, is about to be evicted with her tiny daughter May. The mother faints from weakness, and May rushes for a doctor. She sees Seymour's sign in a window and asks him to help her mother. Then the man shows his caliber. Because she has no money, he turns her away. Calhoun, the lawyer, meets May, learns of her plight, and, although poor, pays the overdue rent, and the family moved back in the house. But the privation she has suffered proved fatal to the mother, and tiny May is left an orphan.

On her deathbed, Mrs. Smith is found by Miss Seaton, who is visiting the poor quarters on charity work, and on the charwoman's passing, the society girl adopts poor little May. The child becomes a happy member of the Seaton family and at the end of the month is a fast friend of the kind-hearted Julia. At the end of a month, too, Julia prepares to decide who shall be her life partner, as promised. But it is little May who really decides. At sight of Seymour, she recalls the physician who turned her away, and denounces him to his own and Miss Julia's face. May recognizes Calhoun as the friend in need and tells Miss Julia so. The latter feels that Calhoun is a real man and would make a splendid husband, so it's a cinch that 'the best man wins.'"

== Cast ==
- Anna Rosemond as Julia Seaton, the rich heiress
- Martin Faust as Dr. John Seymour, the wealthy physician
- Frank H. Crane as Richard Calhoun, the poor lawyer
- Marie Eline as May, the young daughter

== Production ==
The writer of the scenario is unknown, but it may have been Lloyd Lonergan. Lonergan was an experienced newspaperman still employed by The New York Evening World while writing scripts for the Thanhouser productions. He was the most important scriptwriter for Thanhouser, averaging 200 scripts a year from 1910 to 1915. While the director of the film is not known, two Thanhouser directors are possible. Barry O'Neil was the stage name of Thomas J. McCarthy, who would direct many important Thanhouser pictures, including its first two-reeler, Romeo and Juliet. Lloyd B. Carleton was the stage name of Carleton B. Little, a director who would stay with the Thanhouser Company for a short time, moving to Biograph Company by the summer of 1910. Bowers attribute neither as the director for this particular production, nor does Bowers credit a cameraman. Blair Smith was the first cameraman of the Thanhouser company, but he was soon joined by Carl Louis Gregory who had years of experience as a still and motion picture photographer. The role of the cameraman was uncredited in 1910 productions.

The leading lady, Anna Rosemond, was one of two leading ladies that Thanhouser would have in its first year of productions. The two suitors vying for her hand in marriage were Martin J. Faust and Frank H. Crane, both of whom were leading men in numerous productions. Frank H. Crane was involved in the very beginnings of the Thanhouser Company from 1909. Crane's was the first leading man of the company and acted in numerous productions before becoming a director at Thanhouser. Bowers credits Martin J. Faust as one of the most important actors for Thanhouser in 1910 and 1911, but Faust's role in productions often went uncredited. The role of a young daughter was Marie Eline, soon to be known and famous as the "Thanhouser Kid". A possible film still exists for the work, and the identity of the actors are complementary in between two identical stills in the Jonathan Silent Film Collection. The description of T-151, identifies the man in the center as Martin Faust and notes the possibility that the still comes from this work. However, the description for T-176 identifies two actors as Harry Benham and Frank Crane, but asserts that the two only worked together in 1911.

== Release and reception ==
The single reel drama, 957 feet (0.29 km) long, was released on May 13, 1910. Whether the film is 957 feet (0.29 km) or 950 feet (0.29 km) long is subject to debate. Bowers notes that some sources state the film is 950 feet (0.29 km) long, one such example is the advertising for the film which lists it as being approximately this length. Advertising for the film recognized the negativity of Friday the 13th and used it to promote the film to redefine the date to instead bring joy. The film was shown across the United States, advertisements for the showing included theaters in Kansas, Texas, and Pennsylvania. Identifying the theaters showing this work is complicated by the identically named The Best Man Wins by Vitagraph. The silent western produced in 1909 was still being shown and advertised in theaters at the time of the release of Thanhouser's film. An ambiguous advertisement, but most likely a Vitagraph reference, is seen in The Hawaiian Star of Hawaii was published on the same day of the Thanhouser release.

Reviews for the film were generally positive. The Moving Picture World found the story to be interesting and well acted, giving no criticism of the production. The New York Dramatic Mirror's review criticized the weak plot and the satisfactory acting, which was diminished by camera consciousness. The review also found that, "[i]n the scene where the child is taken from her mother's deathbed too little attention is paid to the corpse." The Leavenworth Times included a review that was favorable and praised the film's photography. The Arkansas City Daily Traveler had an advertisement from the Lotus Theater that stated Thanhouser films were rivaling Independent Moving Pictures. No known existing copies, complete or partial, are known to exist.

== See also ==
- List of American films of 1910
