= The Best Man Wins =

The Best Man Wins may refer to:

- The Best Man Wins (1910 film), a 1910 silent film by Thanhouser
- The Best Man Wins (1911 film), a 1911 silent film by Nestor
- Best Man Wins, a 1948 film by Columbia Pictures
- The Best Man Wins (1935 film), a 1935 film starring Bela Lugosi
