= The Two Roses =

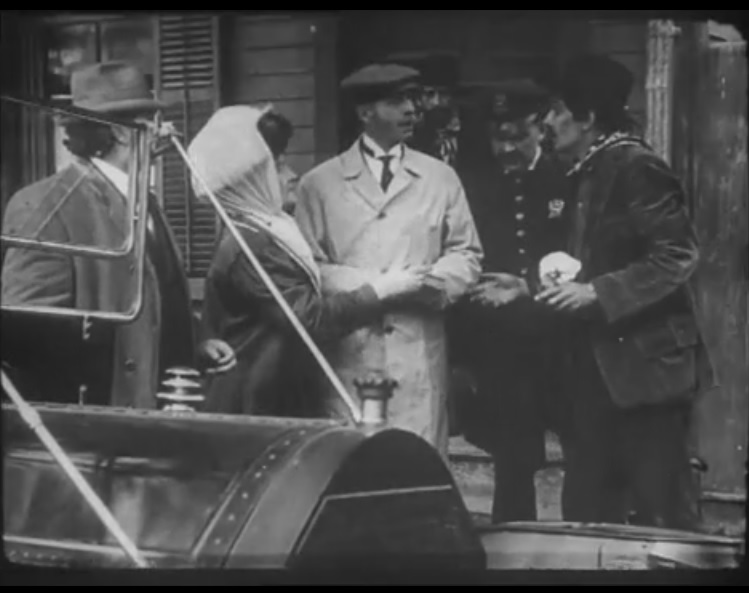
- Tony is wrongly arrested in a case of mistaken identity
- Produced by: Thanhouser Company
- Release date: June 7, 1910
- Running time: 12 minutes
- Country: United States
- Languages: Silent; English intertitles

The Two Roses is a 1910 American silent short drama film produced by the Thanhouser Company. The film focuses on the young Tony Prolo who goes to deliver lunch to his father of the same name. After arriving and giving him his lunch, the young Tony is hit by a passing vehicle and the father rushes his son home. Mr. Sears, whose car hit the child, receives a demand for $10,000 by the "Black Hand". The Sears go to the police and set a trap for the Black Hand, but end up wrongly arresting the child's father. Tony convinces the police to investigate further and the confusion is cleared up when the real culprit is caught. Mr. Sears compensates the family by purchasing them a house in the countryside. The film features Marie Eline, cast in the role of an Italian boy, along with the leading players Frank H. Crane and Anna Rosemond as the parents. The film was released on June 7, 1910. The film survives with new inter-titles that were created to replace the lost materials.

== Plot ==
The film begins with a young Italian boy, Tony Prolo, who is preparing to deliver his father's lunch to him. The boy sets off to the railroad construction area, passing the dangerous terrain without incident. The father, Tony Prolo (Senior), greets his young son and happily takes his lunch. His young son begins tossing rocks across the street and runs out into the road and is knocked down by a passing vehicle. Tony rushes to his son's aid and the rich man, Mr. Sears gets out the car and attempts to comfort the father. The father rejects him and rushes home, carrying his son in his arms. At home, Tony Prolo and his wife attend to their son and pray for his health.

At his residence, Mr. Sears receives a letter by the "Black Hand" demanding $10,000 for ruining a person's life. The letter tells him to give the money to a man at a specific street corner who will be carrying a white rose. Sears heads to the police and the detective lays a trap for the Black Hand man. At the same time, Tony Prolo has gone to see the doctor and stops by the florist to get a white rose for his flower-loving son. After he purchases the rose, his path crosses with Mr. Sears and the detective at the street corner, and he is arrested because he is carrying a white rose. The real Black Hand man is hiding behind a door and witnesses the arrest of Tony Prolo, but is discovered by the constable and he is arrested after he was discovered carrying a white rose.

Tony Prolo convinces the Sears to have the police investigate his story, and they all are brought to Tony Prolo's home. The Sears family sees his suffering son and the confusion over the Black Hand is resolved when the constable brings the real suspect into the room. Tony Prolo is released and Mr. Sears compensates the family by purchasing a cottage in the country that is surrounding by white roses.

== Cast ==
- Marie Eline as Tony, an Italian boy
- Frank H. Crane as Tony Prolo
- Anna Rosemond as Tony Prolo's wife

== Production ==
The writer of the scenario is unknown, but it may have been Lloyd Lonergan. Lonergan was an experienced newspaperman still employed by The New York Evening World while writing scripts for the Thanhouser productions. He was the most important script writer for Thanhouser, averaging 200 scripts a year from 1910 to 1915. The film director is unknown, but two Thanhouser directors are possible. Barry O'Neil was the stage name of Thomas J. McCarthy, who would direct many important Thanhouser pictures, including its first two-reeler, Romeo and Juliet. Lloyd B. Carleton was the stage name of Carleton B. Little, a director who would stay with the Thanhouser Company for a short time, moving to Biograph Company by the summer of 1910. Film historian Q. David Bowers does not attribute a cameraman for this production, but two possible candidates exist. Blair Smith was the first cameraman of the Thanhouser company, but he was soon joined by Carl Louis Gregory who had years of experience as a still and motion picture photographer. The role of the cameraman was uncredited in 1910 productions.

The role of the Italian father Tony was played by Frank H. Crane. Crane was involved in the very beginnings of the Thanhouser Company and acted in numerous productions before becoming a director at Thanhouser. In the role of Tony's wife was Anna Rosemond, who was one of two leading ladies for the first year of the company. Marie Eline, played the role of Tony's son, was concealed in masculine make up and black hair for the role of the Italian boy. The Moving Picture World said, "[m]aybe you'd never recognize her if we did not tip you off. Don't pass the tip to others in your place, but see if their little favorite doesn't fool them completely in her masculine makeup." Other members of the cast have not been identified.

== Release and reception ==
The single-reel drama, approximately 1000 feet long, was released on June 7, 1910. This production was the first Tuesday release in the Thanhouser "two a week" releases. The production was advertised as a "A powerful, pathetic, pretty story of life in Little Italy." The Moving Picture World contained a brief article that used the term "The Thanhouser Kid" to describe Marie Eline; it was the origin of the nickname for Eline. The film had a wide national release: it was advertised by theaters in Kansas, Indiana, Texas, and Pennsylvania.

In 1987, the film was erroneously claimed to be an adaptation of Charles Dickens serial novel Little Dorrit by H. Philip Bolton in Novels on Stage - Dickens dramatized. Bolton writes, "[t]he first film in some sense from the novel - albeit indirectly - would appear to have been a "Two Roses" movie produced in 1910 by Thanhouser."

A mostly complete print of the film survives and has been preserved in its 35 mm state by the Deutsche Kinemathek - Museum für Film und Fernsehen in Berlin. The surviving print had only a French language title card "Les Deux Roses" and was devoid of intertitles. New German intertitles were added by Urte Alfs and Anke Mebold of the Deutsches Filminstitut based on the published synopsis from The Moving Picture World. The restored work uses an original music composition composed and performed by Günter A. Buchwald. Ned Thanhouser made available an English language translation of the new German intertitles. The film is also released as part of a two-disc DVD set, Screening the Poor, published in the Edition Filmmuseum Series.

== See also ==
- List of American films of 1910
