= The Newsy and the Tramp =

Silent short film of 1911

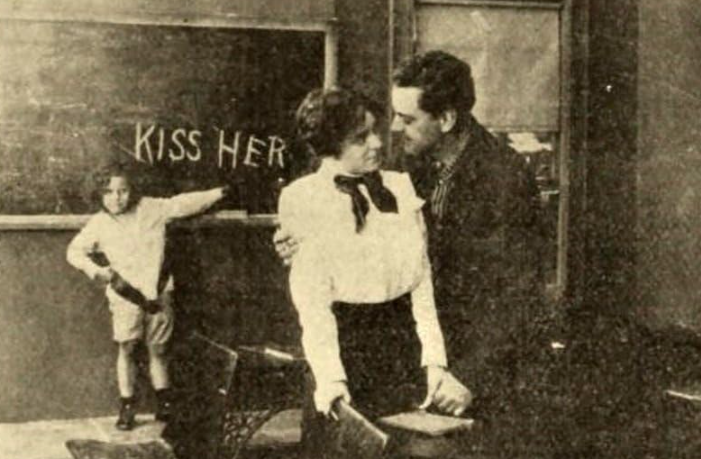
- Featuring child star Marie Eline
- Production companies: Thanhouser Films, New Rochelle, New York
- Release date: December 5, 1911
- Country: United States

The Newsy and the Tramp is a 1911 silent short film featuring child star Marie Eline. It was produced by the Thanhouser company motion picture studio, and released on December 5, 1911. Although Marie Eline was a girl, she played the role of the newsboy Ragsy, and dressed the part. According to a contemporary review,

The small newsboy comes as a reforming force into the tramp's life. After protecting him from the designs of other tramps, the tramp obtains a position at a blacksmith's, and sends the boy to school. The boy becomes the teacher's champion. He introduces her to the reformed tramp, who becomes her pupil. In the last scene - a clever and humorous concert - the boy starts a love affair with a sly 'kiss her' on the blackboard when her back is turned. Then the man apparently begins to wake up, and the rest is left to the imagination of the spectator, which shows rare art and discretion for a present day picture.

— The New York Dramatic Mirror, December 13, 1911

The film was produced by Gertrude Homan Thanhouser, and is listed as part of the Women Pioneers Film Project.
