= The Morning Telegraph =

New York City broadsheet newspaper owned by Moe Annenberg's Cecelia Corporation

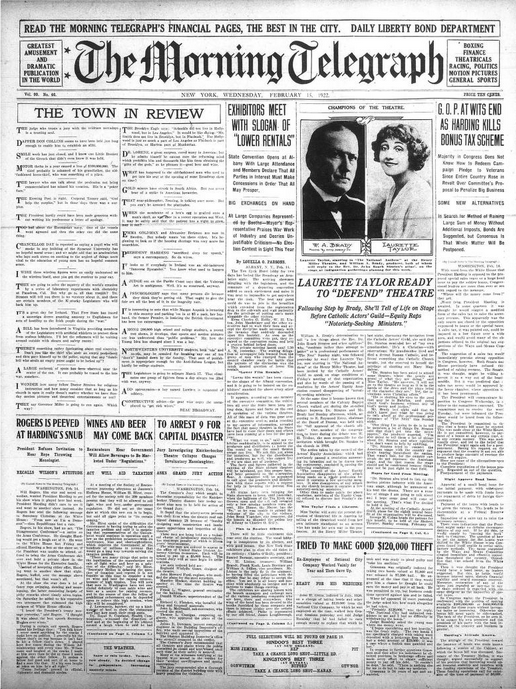
- Front page of the Morning Telegraph for February 15, 1922.
- Type: Daily newspaper
- Format: Broadsheet
- Owner: Triangle Publications, Inc.
- Publisher: Stewart Hooker
- Founded: 1839
- Ceased publication: 1972
- Headquarters: 525 West 52nd Street, Manhattan
- OCLC number: 9609206

The Morning Telegraph (1839 – April 10, 1972) (sometimes referred to as the New York Morning Telegraph) was a New York City broadsheet newspaper owned by Moe Annenberg's Cecelia Corporation. It was first published as the Sunday Mercury from 1839 to 1897 and became The Morning Telegraph in December, 1897.

The paper was devoted mostly to theatrical and horse racing news. It published a Sunday edition as the Sunday Telegraph. On closing, it was replaced by an Eastern edition of Triangle's sister publication, the Daily Racing Form.
