= Marie Eline =

American actress

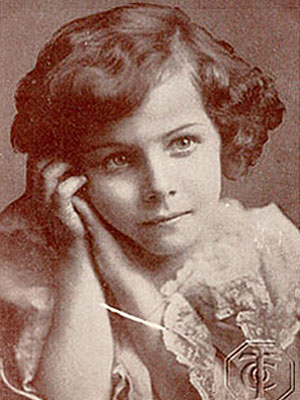
- Eline in 1910
- Born: Anna Marie Eline; February 27, 1902; Milwaukee, Wisconsin, U.S.
- Died: January 3, 1981 (aged 78); Longview, Washington, U.S.
- Other names: The Thanhouser Kid
- Citizenship: United States
- Occupation: Child actor
- Years active: 1910–1914
- Spouse(s): Milton Edward Blasier, Jr. (m. 1922)
- Children: 1
- Relatives: Grace Eline (sister)

Marie Eline (February 27, 1902 – January 3, 1981) was an American silent film child actress and sister of Grace Eline. Their mother was an actress.

Eline acted on stage for three years before she acted in films. Nicknamed "The Thanhouser Kid", she began acting for the Thanhouser Company in New Rochelle, New York, at the age of eight and starred in exactly one hundred films between 1910 and 1914.

By August 1915, Eline headed her own vaudeville company, presenting a playlet. In 1929, the Eline sisters formed a specialty act that was featured in an "'all-girl' show" that performed in Atlanta, Georgia. The duo was still performing in 1932.

== Filmography ==
- The Vicar of Wakefield (1910)
- Rip Van Winkle (1910/II)
- A Thanksgiving Surprise (1910)
- The Little Fire Chief (1910) .... Willie Stone
- Ten Nights in a Bar Room (1910) .... Little Mary
- The Fairies' Hallowe'en (1910) .... Marie
- The Restoration (1910) .... The Little Girl
- The Mermaid (1910)
- Uncle Tom's Cabin (1910/II) .... Little Eva
- The Playwright's Love (1910) .... Grace, an Orphan
- The Girls of the Ghetto (1910) .... An Immigrant Child of the Ghetto
- The Lucky Shot (1910) .... The Little Boy
- The Flag of His Country (1910) .... The Granddaughter
- The Governor's Daughter (1910) .... Nell, the Governor's Daughter
- The Little Hero of Holland (1910) .... Hans, the Little Dutch Boy
- The Two Roses (1910) .... Tony's Son
- The Best Man Wins (1910) .... A Poor Charwoman's Tiny Daughter
- Jane Eyre (1910) .... Jane Eyre as a Child
- A Twenty-Nine Cent Robbery (1910) .... Edna Robinson
- A Doll's House (1911; short film)
- David Copperfield (1911)
- She (1911) .... Leo Vincey as a Youth
- The Tomboy (1911) (as The Thanhouser Kid) .... The Tomboy's Little Sister
- The Newsy and the Tramp (1911) .... Ragsy, the Newsboy
- The Missing Heir (1911) .... The Little Heir
- The Satyr and the Lady (1911) .... The Peddler's Daughter
- David Copperfield (1911) .... Em'ly as a Child
- The Tempter and Dan Cupid (1911) .... Dan Cupid
- The Five Rose Sisters (1911) .... The Littlest Rose Sister
- In the Chorus (1911) .... The Little Daughter
- The Buddhist Priestess (1911) .... The Little Daughter
- Cupid the Conqueror (1911) .... Cupid
- Back to Nature (1911) .... The Sick Child
- The Judge's Story (1911) .... The Little Black Boy
- The Pied Piper of Hamelin (1911) .... The Little Lame Boy
- Two Little Girls (1911) .... Forlorn, unknown stepsister
- The Court's Decree (1911) .... The Little Daughter
- Lorna Doone (1911) .... Lorna, Age 5
- Flames and Fortune (1911) .... The Youngster
- The Stepmother (1911) .... The Younger Sister
- A Circus Stowaway (1911) .... The Little Boy Circus Stowaway
- Get Rich Quick (1911) .... Daughter of poor widow
- The Stage Child (1911) .... The Stage Chlld
- The Colonel and the King (1911) .... George IV, The Child King
- The Poet of the People (1911)
- Velvet and Rags (1911) .... A Little Boy
- The Charity of the Poor (1911) .... The Little Girl
- Silas Marner (1911) .... The Little Orphan Girl
- Stage Struck (1911)
- The Little Mother (1911) .... The Little Mother
- A Newsboy Hero (1911) .... Marie, the Little Daughter
- Adrift (1911) .... Their Young Daughter
- Only in the Way (1911) .... Marie
- The Old Curiosity Shop (1911) .... Little Nell
- The Forest Rose (1912)
- The Truant's Doom (1912) .... Tim, the Little Truant Boy
- Cross Your Heart (1912) .... The Farmer's Little Daughter
- In Time of Peril (1912) .... The Younger Brother
- Put Yourself in His Place (1912)
- In a Garden (1912) .... Miss May as a Child
- When Mercy Tempers Justice (1912) .... One of the Daughters
- The Warning (1912) .... The Young Son
- Please Help the Pore (1912) .... The Poor Couple's Daughter
- But the Greatest of These Is Charity (1912) .... The Poor Mother's Child
- Don't Pinch My Pup (1912) .... Tim, The Little Newsboy
- Treasure Trove (1912) .... The Gold-Seeking Country Boy
- The Ranchman and the Hungry Bird (1912) .... The Little Boy
- Nursie and the Knight (1912) .... The Little Girl
- Doggie's Debut (1912) .... Jack, the Little Boy
- The Professor's Son (1912) .... The Professor's Son
- On the Stroke of Five (1912)
- Her Secret (1912)
- Dottie's New Doll (1912) .... Dottie
- The Little Shut-In (1912) .... The Little Shut-In
- The Cry of the Children (1912) .... Alice, the little girl
- When Mandy Came to Town (1912) .... Mandy
- The Baby Bride (1912) .... The Little Boy
- The Star of the Side Show (1912) .... A Midget, The Star of the Side Show
- Nicholas Nickleby (1912) .... Squeers's Son, Wackford
- The Poacher (1912) .... The Old Man's Grandson
- The Guilty Baby (1912) .... The Plumber's Detective Daughter
- Washington in Danger (1912) .... The Little Black Boy
- On Probation (1912) .... The Orphan Granddaughter
- East Lynne (1912) .... Willie
- Her Ladyship's Page (1912) .... Her Ladyship's Page
- Dr. Jekyll and Mr. Hyde (1912) .... Little girl knocked down by Hyde
- Just a Bad Kid (1912) .... The Bad Kid
- The Passing (1912)
- Cupid's Lieutenant (1913)
- The Law of Humanity (1913)
- His Imaginary Family (1913)
- A Campaign Manageress (1913)
- Looking for Trouble (1913)
- Lobster Salad and Milk (1913)
- Flood Tide (1913/I)
- The Medium's Nemesis (1913)
- Just a Shabby Doll (1913) .... The little girl of long ago
- The Dove in the Eagle's Nest (1913) .... The Eagle's Sister
- The Tiniest of Stars (1913) .... The Little Boy
- The Evidence of the Film (1913) .... Messenger Boy
- The Purse and the Girl (1914) .... Errand Boy
- Uncle Tom's Cabin (1914) .... Little Eva St. Clair
