= Anna Rosemond =

American actress

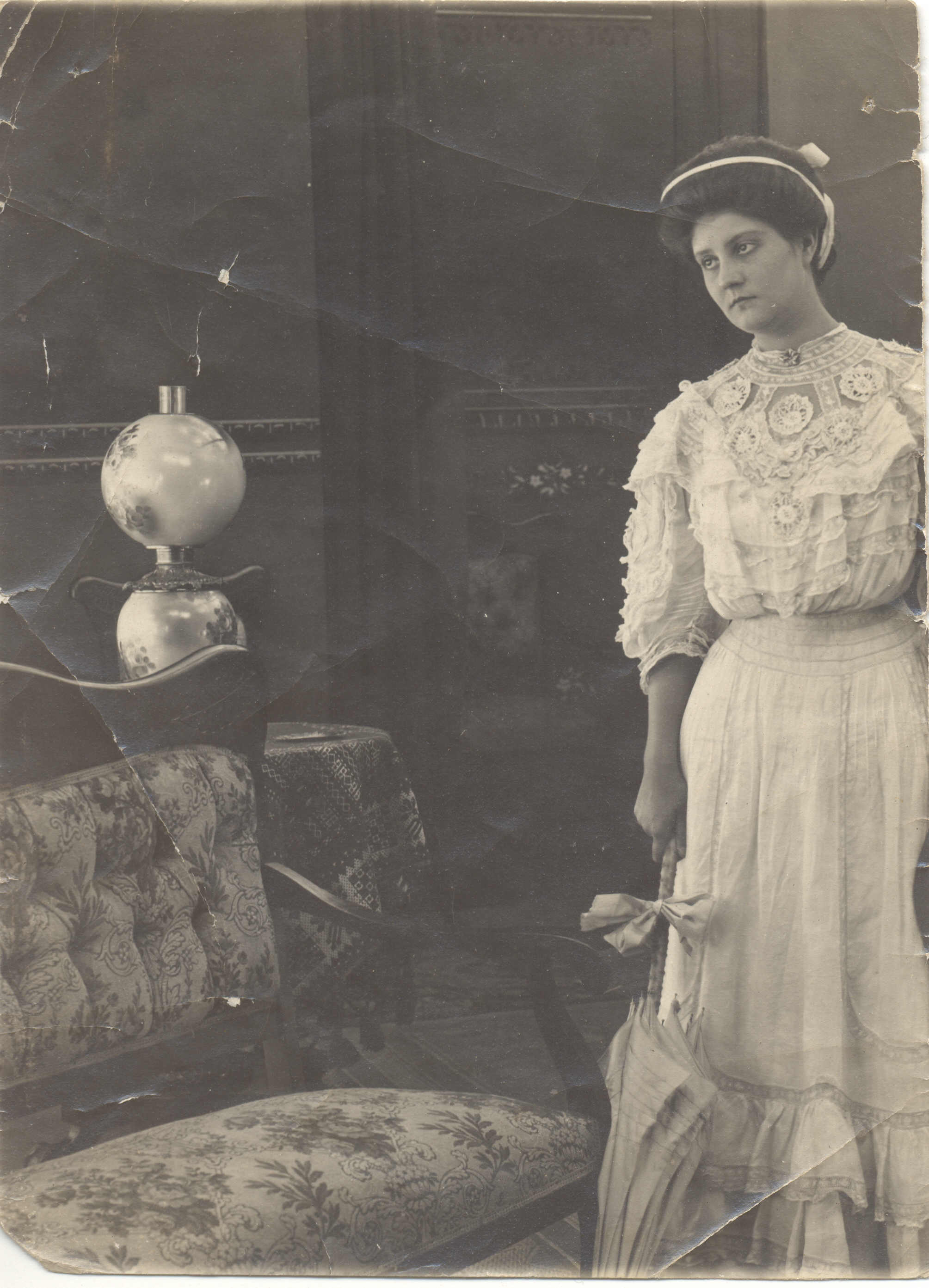
- Rosemond in 1911
- Born: Anna Miers Rosemond; February 16, 1886; Philadelphia, Pennsylvania, U.S.
- Died: 1966 (aged 79–80); San Diego, California, U.S.
- Occupation: Actress

Anna Rosemond (February 16, 1886 – 1966) was one of the earliest American film actresses of the early silent film era.

== Biography ==
Rosemond was born in Philadelphia, Pennsylvania on February 16, 1886. Her father was an Austrian immigrant, her mother a first generation American of German parentage.

== Films ==
She started her film acting career in 1910, having a supporting role in the film The Actor's Children, starring Frank Hall Crane, as well as an early film version of Uncle Tom's Cabin, which also starred Crane and early child actress Marie Eline. She starred in fifteen films that year, almost all opposite Crane, to include She Stoops to Conquer, and The Two Roses again opposite Marie Eline and again, Frank Hall Crane. She also appeared in the 1911 film Cinderella, starring Florence La Badie and Frank Hall Crane. She was estimated to have appeared in 250 one and two-reel films, mostly produced by Pathe Studios in New York City.

In 1914, she appeared with Charles Hutchinson, Henry Ludlow, Alfred Miller, Albert Prisco, Irene Wallace, and Alfred White in the short film, A Beggar Prince of India. She was cast as Fatima, sister of the prince.

== Family ==
Following her departure from film acting, she married George Jenkins Tompkins of Brooklyn, a New York City policeman of English/Irish descent. The two left New York City for California, where she gave birth to one daughter, Irma.

== Later years, death and interment ==
When George Jenkins Tompkins died, Anna remarried Daniel Satten, and spent the rest of her life in San Diego, California. She died there on April 3, 1966 at the age of eighty, and was interred at the Cypress View Mausoleum in that city.
