= New York Dramatic Mirror =

American theatre periodical

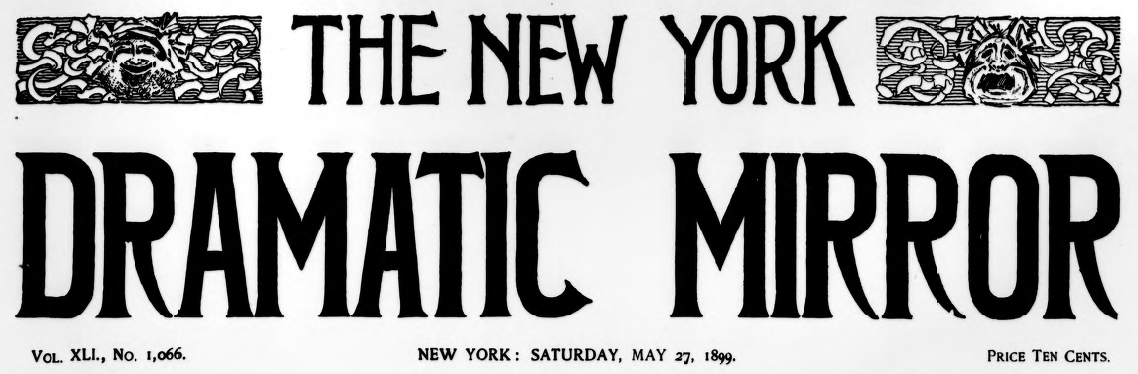

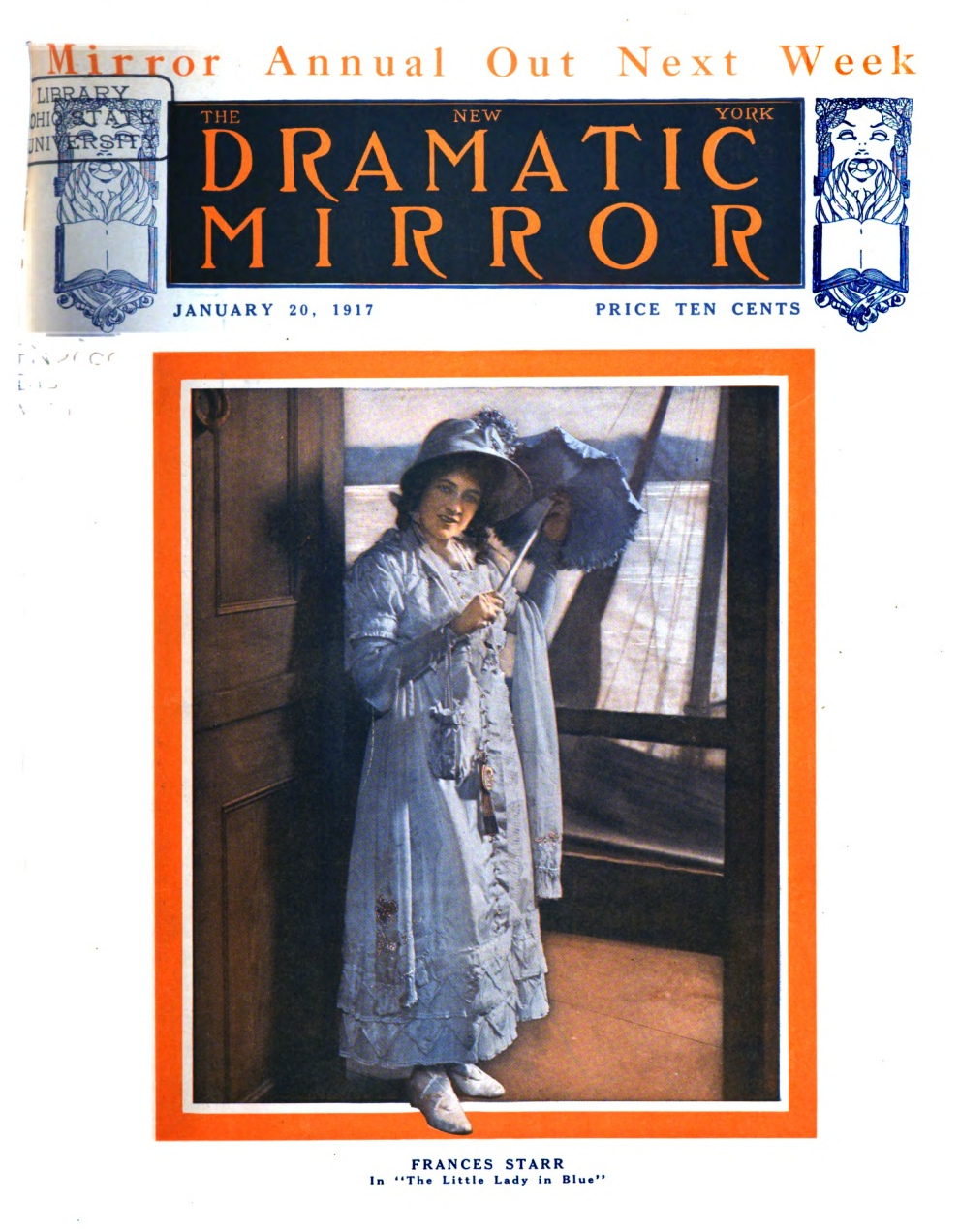
- Type: Weekly
- Founded: January 1879
- Ceased publication: April 1922
- Headquarters: Manhattan

The New York Dramatic Mirror (1879–1922) was an American theatrical trade newspaper published in New York City.

== History ==
The paper was founded in January 1879 by Ernest Harvier as the New York Mirror. In stating its purpose to cover the theater, it proclaimed that coverage of the dramatic profession had been "degraded by having its affairs treated in the professedly theatrical papers side by side with prize fights, cocking matches, baseball, and other sports." This referred to competitors such as the New York Clipper.

The word "Dramatic" was inserted in the title in 1889, and the "New York" dropped in 1917. Harrison Grey Fiske started contributing in 1879, and eventually obtained ownership of the paper. Fiske's involvement ended in 1911. Frederick Franklin Schrader and Lymon O. Fiske then took over.

The paper published until April 1922, after changing from a weekly publication to a monthly at its very end.

== Contributors ==
Frank Luther Mott, a historian of American magazines, called the Mirror the "matchless chronicler of the New York stage," though it also included reports from other cities including London and Chicago. Contributors over its history included William Winter ("Dramatic Diary" column), Nym Crinkle ("Feuilleton"), Frank E. Woods ("Spectator" column), Burns Mantle, Mary H. Fiske ("The Giddy Gusher"), and Charles Carroll.

== See also ==
- New York Clipper
- Illustrated Sporting and Dramatic News
- The Morning Telegraph
- Variety
