= Frank Hall Crane =

American actor

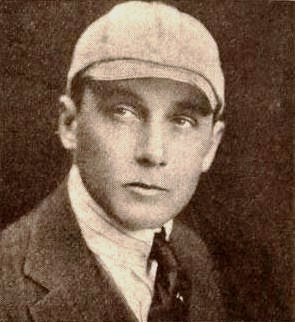
- Crane in 1918
- Born: January 1, 1873; San Francisco, California, US
- Died: September 1, 1948 (aged 75); Los Angeles, California, US
- Occupations: Actor; film director
- Years active: 1909–1939

Frank Hall Crane (January 1, 1873 – September 1, 1948) was an American stage and film actor and director. He appeared in more than 70 films between 1909 and 1939. He also directed 48 films between 1914 and 1927. His first screen writing included The Stolen Voice in 1915. He was born in San Francisco, California.

His wife Irene Crane appeared in many of his films and was still alive when he died in 1948.

Crane died on September 1, 1948, at the Motion Picture Country Home Hospital in Woodland Hills, Los Angeles, aged 75.

== Selected filmography ==
- Paul and Virginia (1910)
- The Mermaid (1910)
- Rip Van Winkle (1910)
- A Leap for Love (1912)
- A Millionaire for a Day (1912)
- Leah Kleschna (1913)
- Paying the Price (1916)
- The Girl Philippa (1917)
- Arsene Lupin (1917)
- Stranded in Arcady (1917)
- An Alabaster Box (1917)
- Vengeance Is Mine (1917)
- The Grell Mystery (1917)
- A Master Stroke (1920)
- The Door That Has No Key (1921)
- The Puppet Man (1921)
- Little Wildcat (1922)
- The Grass Orphan (1922)
- A Girl's Desire (1922)
- The Pauper Millionaire (1922)
- Hutch Stirs 'em Up (1923)
- Tons of Money (1924)
- Fair Play (1925)
- My Old Dutch (1926)
- The Jade Cup (1926)
- The Trunk Mystery (1926)
- Bitter Sweets (1928)
- The Man from Nevada (1929)
- Out of Singapore (1932)
- The Speed Reporter (1936)
