= Lloyd Lonergan =

American screenwriter

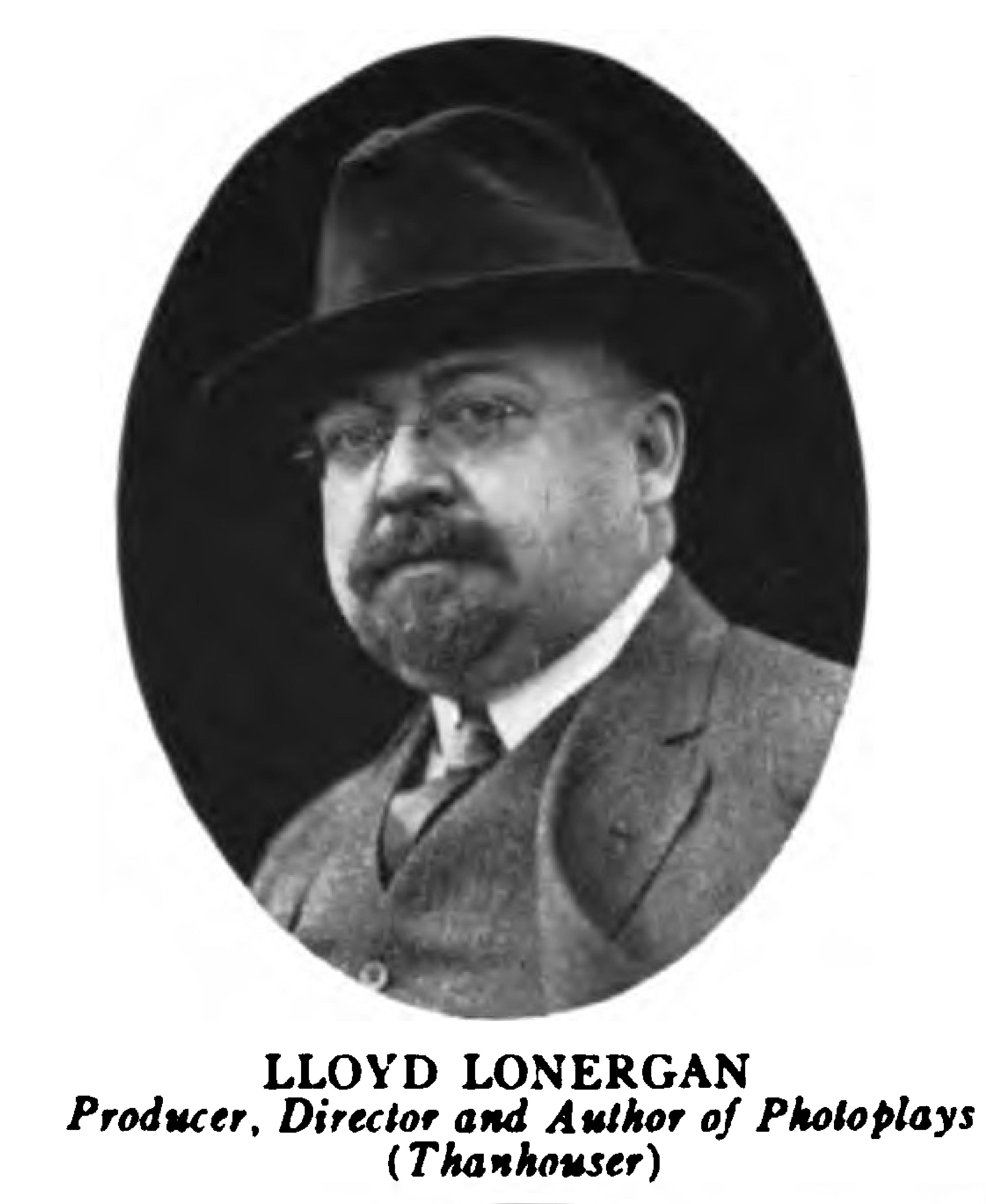
- Born: March 3, 1870; Chicago, Illinois
- Died: April 6, 1937 (aged 67); New York City
- Years active: 1910 - 1921

Lloyd Lonergan (March 3, 1870, Chicago, Illinois - April 6, 1937, New York City) was one of the most prolific scenario and screenwriters in American silent film.

A brother-in-law of Edwin Thanhouser he worked for the Thanhouser Company based in New Rochelle, New York, writing screenplays for over 100 films.

His career was at its peak in the earlier short film era particularly in 1912 when Lonergan wrote the scripts for an astonishing 50 films. His sister Elizabeth Lonergan and brother Philip Lonergan were also a notable screenwriters, and his mother Ellen Mahoney Lonergan was a newspaper society editor.

== Selected filmography ==
- Robin Hood (1913)
- A Modern Monte Cristo (1917)
- Her Beloved Enemy (1917)
- The Man Without a Country (1917)
- My Lady's Garter (1919)
- Why Women Sin (1920)
