= The Man Without a Country (disambiguation) =

"The Man Without a Country" is an 1863 short story by Edward Everett Hale.

The Man Without a Country may also refer to:

- The Man Without a Country (1917 film), an American silent film adaptation of the short story
- The Man Without a Country (1925 film), directed by Rowland V. Lee
- The Man Without a Country (1937 film), a short, and a remake of the 1917 film
- The Man Without a Country (1973 film), a TV movie
- The Man Without a Country (opera), a 1937 opera by composer Walter Damrosch
- The Man Without a Country (album), a 1947 album narrated by Bing Crosby

== See also ==
- A Man Without a Country, a 2005 essay collection by Kurt Vonnegut
