= Ethyle Cooke =

American actress

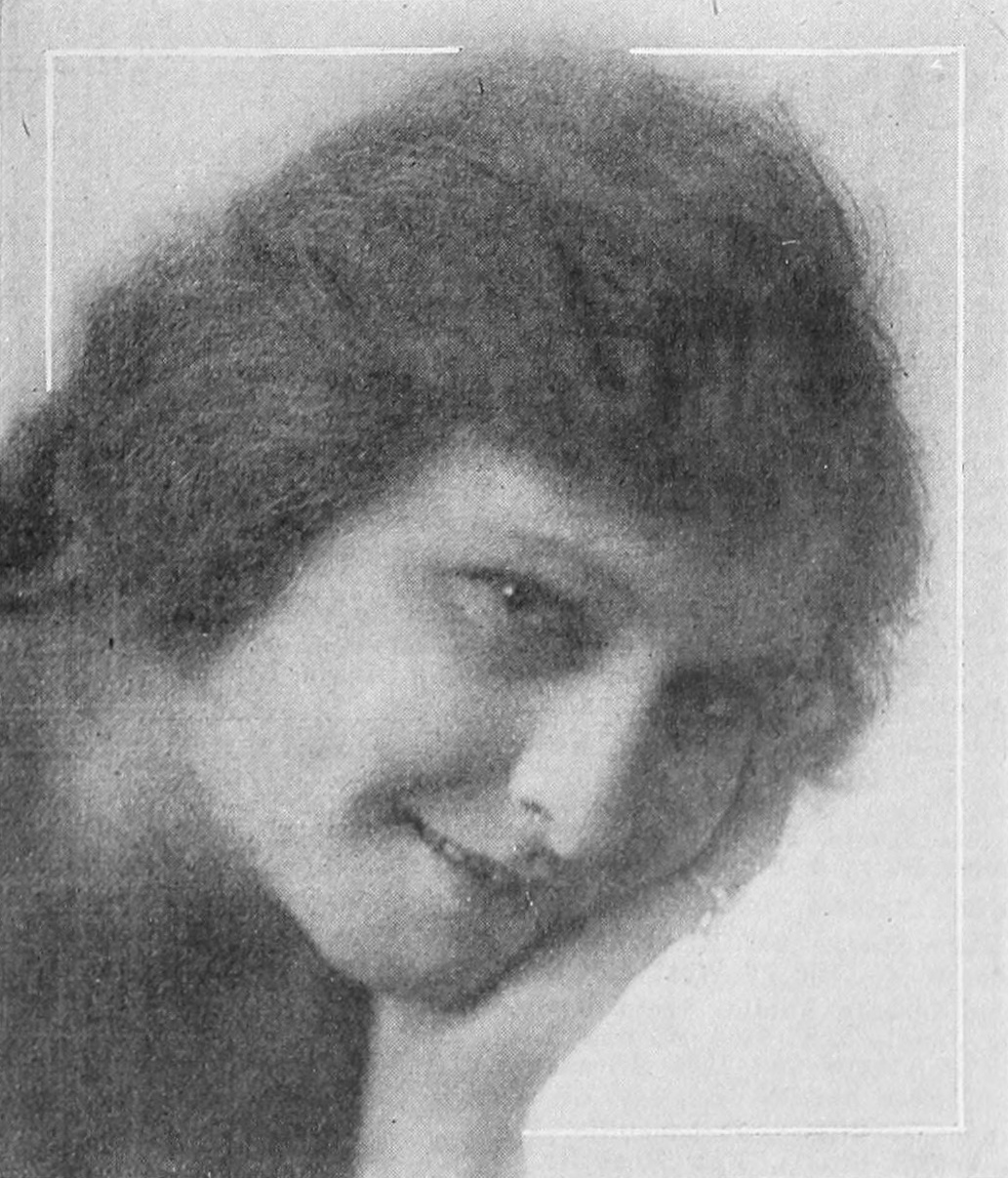
- Born: August 4, 1885; Lynn, Massachusetts, U.S.
- Died: April 20, 1949 (aged 63); Waukesha, Wisconsin, U.S.
- Occupation: Actress
- Years active: 1912–1918
- Spouse: Harry Benham
- Children: 2

Ethyle Cooke (August 4, 1885 – April 20, 1949) was an American silent film actress of the 1910s. she married another prominent silent film actor of the time, Harry Benham. Cooke starred in many popular films, such as A Small Town Girl, Stronger than Death, and The Fugitive.

== Background ==
Ethyle Cooke was born Ethel Cook on August 4, 1885, in Lynn, Massachusetts. She grew up in her hometown, and was educated at the Girls' Latin School in nearby Boston. She began her stage career early when, at the age of 12, she performed at the Boston Museum (even though she had been tap dancing since the age of 6). She made her stage debut in Little Red Riding Hood. Later theatrical productions included Peggy from Paris, Woodland, and Madame Sherry.

== Career at Thanhouser ==
Her film career began in 1911, when she joined the Thanhouser film company in New Rochelle, New York, and she remained there until 1917. She married Harry Benham, another actor working at the Thanhouser. They lived a long, happily married life and had two children, Dorothy and Leland Benham, who were also prominent Thanhouser personalities, as they appeared in several films.

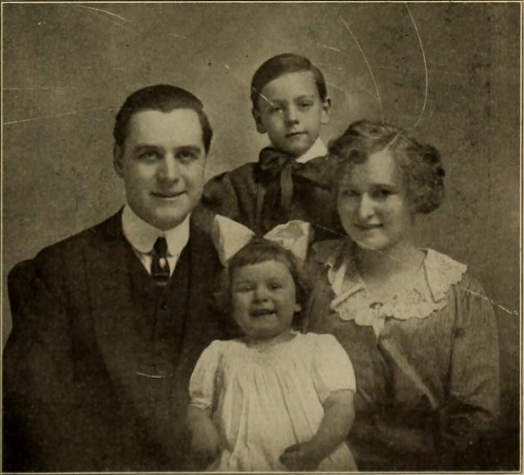
Ethyle Cooke with husband Harry Benham and children Leland and Dorothy, circa 1912

By mid-1914, she had made over 200 screen appearances, and her nickname on the set came to be "Cookie". During this time at Thanhouser, she spent one year starring in lead roles with Florence LaBadie. The Moving Picture World, produced in 1916, told of Cooke's close association with LaBadie: "When you see Florence LaBadie's name in the cast of a photoplay, close by you will find Ethyle Cooke's. At the Thanhouser studios they wouldn't think of casting a Florence LaBadie feature without putting Ethyle Cook in it." In the movie The Fugitive, Cooke's character commits a murder, while letting LaBadie's take the blame. Another film where they worked closely together was The Fear of Poverty, in which LaBadie's character runs off with Cooke's fiance. Finally, in Saint, Devil, and Woman, Cooke's character suffers at the mercy of a man who also has power over LaBadie's character.

Cooke died April 20, 1949, in Waukesha, Wisconsin.

== Filmography ==
- Nicholas Nickleby (1912) .... Actress playing Juliet
- Dottie's New Doll (1912)
- The Merchant of Venice (1912) .... Nerissa
- The Wrecked Taxi (1912)
- Lucile (1912)
- The Star of Bethlehem (1912)
- A Fall Into Luck (1913)
- A Clothes-Line Quarrel (1913)
- Their Great Big Beautiful Doll (1913)
- What Might Have Been (1913)
- An Orphan's Romance (1913)
- The Head Waiter (1913)
- An Amateur Animal Trainer (1913)
- Twins and a Stepmother (1914)
- A Leak in the Foreign Office (1914)
- A Decree of Justice (1914)
- The Infant Heart Snatcher (1914)
- The Smouldering Spark (1914)
- A Woman's Loyalty (1914)
- Algy's Alibi (1914) .... Maude, Algy's Wife
- The Scrub Lady (1914)
- Deborah (1914) .... Anna
- A Gentleman for a Day (1914)
- The Butterfly Bug (1914)
- Stronger Than Death (1914)
- A Dog's Love (1914) .... Helen's mother
- The Turning of the Road (1914) .... Sidney's Wife
- Keeping a Husband (1914)
- A Messenger of Gladness (1914)
- Mrs. Van Ruyter's Stratagem (1914)
- In Wild Man's Land (1914)
- In the Conservatory (1914)
- A Hatful of Trouble (1914) .... Effie Linton
- His Sister's Kiddies (1915)
- Daughter of Kings (1915)
- It's an Ill Wind (1915)
- The Six-Cent Loaf (1915)
- His Guardian Auto (1915)
- Ebenezer Explains (1915)
- The Two Cent Mystery (1915)
- Old Jane of the Gaiety (1915)
- His Two Patients (1915) .... A Wealthy Patient
- The Game (1915)
- Gussie, the Graceful Lifeguard (1915)
- The Crogmere Ruby (1915)
- Snapshots (1915)
- From the River's Depths (1915)
- The Mother of Her Dreams (1915)
- The Commuted Sentence (1915)
- Mr. Meeson's Will (1915)
- Inspiration (1915) .... Undetermined Role
- All Aboard (1915/II)
- His Vocation (1915) .... Nurse
- The Necklace of Pearls (1915)
- Their Last Performance (1915)
- The Spirit of the Game (1916)
- What Doris Did (1916)
- A Man's Sins (1916)
- John Brewster's Wife (1916)
- The Fugitive (1916) .... Anna Prentice
- The Fear of Poverty (1916) .... Betty Alsted
- Saint, Devil and Woman (1916) .... Grace Carter
- The Pillory (1916) .... Meg Doherty
- Her New York (1917) .... Laura
- Her Life and His (1917) .... Mrs. Nan Travers
- The Small Town Girl (1917) .... Mame
- The Candy Girl (1917)
- Patsy (1917) .... Alice Hewitt
- Convict 993 (1918) .... Stella Preston
