= Theodore Marston =

American film director

Theodore Marston (August 10, 1868 in Minnesota – October 2, 1920 in Los Angeles, California, United States) was an American silent film director and writer during the early silent period. He directed films including Aurora Floyd in 1912 and worked with actors such as William Garwood and Harry Benham. He became head of dramatic film production at the Kinemacolor Company of America in October 1913.

== Selected filmography ==
- She (1911)
- The Last of the Mohicans (1911)
- David Copperfield (1911) recent research disputes that Marston directed this film
- Put Yourself in His Place (1912)
- Aurora Floyd (1912)
- Robin Hood (1913)
- The Battle of Frenchman's Run (1915)
- The Caveman (1915)
- The Primrose Path (1915)
- The Wheels of Justice (1915)
- The Surprises of an Empty Hotel (1916)
- The Secret Kingdom (1917)
- The Raggedy Queen (1917)
- Wrath (1917)
- The Seventh Sin (1917)
- The Girl by the Roadside (1917)
- Beyond the Law (1918)
- The Black Gate (1919)
