= The Fear of Poverty =

1916 film by Frederic Sullivan

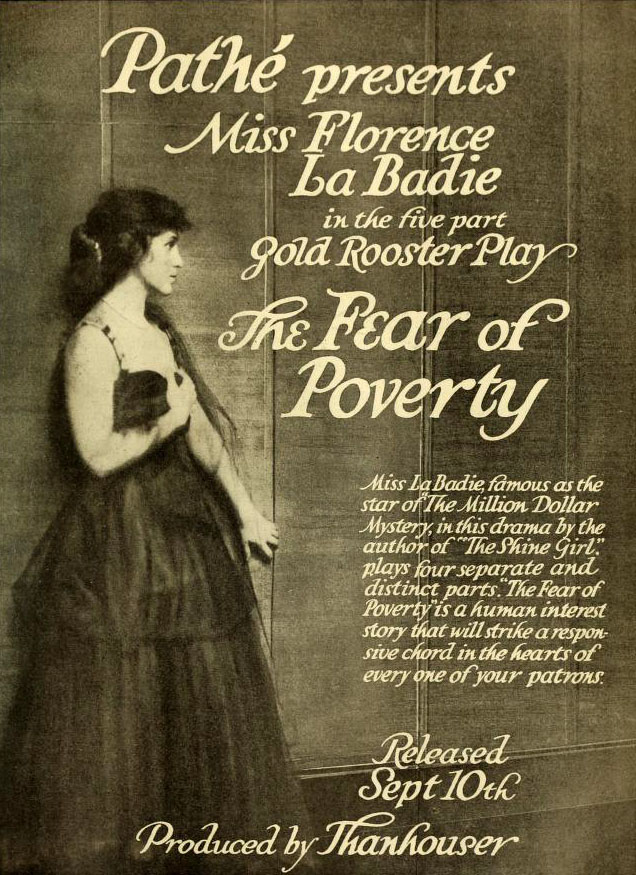
- Advertisement for the film printed in Moving Picture World, September 1916
- Directed by: Frederic Sullivan
- Written by: Agnes Christine Johnston (scenario)
- Starring: Florence La Badie; Edwin Stanley
- Cinematography: Charles Hoffman
- Production company: Thanhouser Film Corporation
- Distributed by: Pathé Exchange, Inc.
- Release date: September 10, 1916
- Running time: 5 reels
- Country: United States
- Language: Silent (English intertitles)

The Fear of Poverty is a 1916 American silent melodrama film directed by Frederic Sullivan. The film starred Florence La Badie and Edwin Stanley. It was produced by Thanhouser and released by Pathé on September 10, 1916.

== Cast ==
- Florence La Badie as Grace Lane and Florence, her daughter
- Edwin Stanley as Alfred Griffin
- Robert Vaughn as Jim Lane
- Ethyle Cooke as Betty Alsted
- George Marlo as John Durand

== Production ==
La Badie played a dual role in the film, which required special double-exposure photography. Reportedly 1,200 feet of double-exposure footage was shot.

== Preservation ==
The Fear of Poverty is currently presumed lost. In February of 2021, the film was cited by the National Film Preservation Board on their Lost U.S. Silent Feature Films list.
