= The Country Girl (1915 film) =

- Directed by: Frederic Richard Sullivan
- Based on: The Country Girl by David Garrick
- Starring: Florence La Badie
- Production company: Thanhouser Company
- Distributed by: Mutual Film
- Release date: June 15, 1915
- Country: United States
- Language: Silent (English intertitles)

The Country Girl is a 1915 American short silent romantic comedy-drama film starring Florence La Badie and directed by Frederic Richard Sullivan. The film is based on David Garrick's 1766 play The Country Girl.

== Cast ==
- Florence La Badie as Phyllis, the Country Girl
- Justus D. Barnes as The Squire, her Guardian
- Harry Benham as Belville, Phyllis' Lover
- Claude Cooper as Sparkish, an Old Beau
- Carey L. Hastings as Alithea, his Sister
- Morgan Jones as Harcourt, a Young Suitor
