= Aurora Floyd (film) =

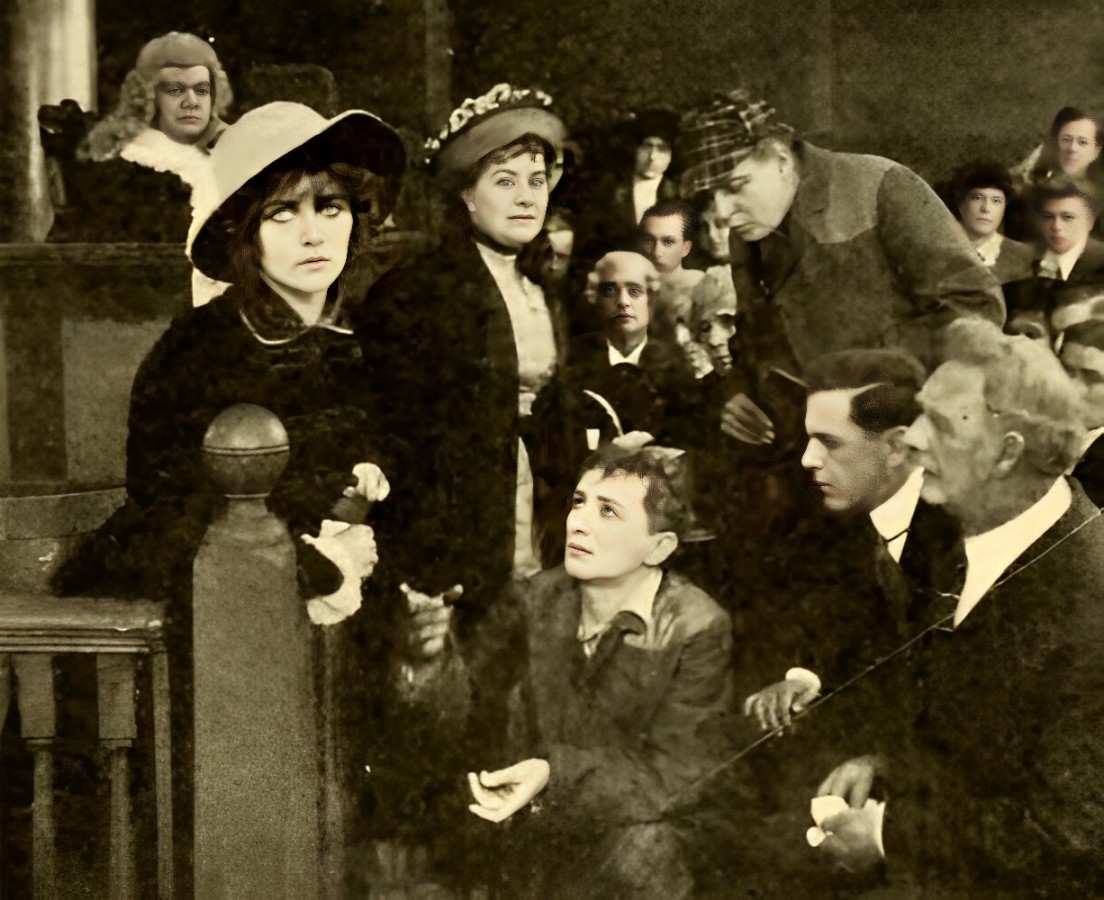
- Directed by: Theodore Marston
- Based on: Aurora Floyd by Mary Elizabeth Braddon
- Starring: Florence La Badie; William Garwood; Harry Benham; Maude Fealy; David Thompson
- Production company: Thanhouser Company
- Distributed by: Film Supply Company
- Release date: December 10, 1912
- Running time: Thanhouser Company
- Country: United States
- Languages: Silent; English intertitles

Aurora Floyd is a 1912 American silent short drama film directed by Theodore Marston based on the 1863 British novel of the same name by Mary Elizabeth Braddon. The film stars Florence La Badie in the title role, William Garwood, and Harry Benham. The film also stars Maude Fealy and David Thompson.

== Cast ==
- Florence La Badie as Aurora Floyd
- Harry Benham as John Mellish, Aurora's second husband
- David Thompson as John Conyers, Aurora's first husband
- Justus D. Barnes as Aurora's father
- William Garwood
- Maude Fealy
