= Ferdinand (The Tempest) =

Character in The Tempest

- The Tempest character
- Created by: William Shakespeare

In-universe information
- Family: Alonso, King of Naples (father); Miranda (wife); Sebastian (uncle); Prospero (father-in-law)

Ferdinand is the prince of Naples and the son of Alonso, the King of Naples, in Shakespeare's play, The Tempest. He falls in love with Miranda and is quick to promise the title of queen and wife to her even though he doesn't know her name. He is happy in humble labours, blinded by love. He makes a solemn vow to be truthful to Prospero, and not to violate Miranda's chastity before their wedding.

== Fictional biography ==
Ferdinand is aboard the ship that runs aground due to the storm created by the sorcerer and old Duke, Prospero. Ferdinand is separated from his father and friends (purposely) by Ariel, the airy servant of Prospero. Ariel leads Ferdinand to Prospero and his daughter Miranda, with whom he instantly falls in love. Ferdinand, who is astounded that Miranda is even human, tells her that she is the most amazing woman he has ever encountered:

Full many a lady
I have eyed with best regard and many a time
The harmony of their tongues hath into bondage
Brought my too diligent ear: for several virtues
Have I liked several women; never any
With so full soul, but some defect in her
Did quarrel with the noblest grace she owed
And put it to the foil: but you, O you,
So perfect and so peerless, are created
Of every creature's best!

Ferdinand casts aside his grief and mourning for his father and friends, who he believes have all perished in the storm. He instead envelops himself in his love (and lust) for Miranda, telling her that he will make her the "Queen of Naples". According to plan, Prospero uses Ferdinand's infatuation with Miranda to re-gain power, and eventually take his rightful position as Duke of Milan. Accusing him of being a spy and traitor, Prospero keeps Ferdinand in isolation and forces him to arbitrarily move logs and large sticks. However, further, into the play, Prospero allows Ferdinand and Miranda to interact and seeing their desire for one another he allows them to marry.

As I hope
For quiet days, fair issue, and long life,
With such love as ’tis now, the murkiest den,
The most opportune place, the strongest suggestion
Our worser genius can, shall never melt
Mine honour into lust, to take away
The edge of that day’s celebration,
When I shall think or Phoebus' steeds are foundered
Or night kept chained below.

Ferdinand displays noble intentions, assuring Prospero that he will not untie Miranda's "virgin knot" until they are formally married. Much to his delight, Ferdinand is eventually reunited with his father and friends. They all return to Naples and Prospero regains his Dukedom. As Samuel Johnson observed, the play thus ends in "the final happiness of the pair for whom our passions and reason are equally interested."

== Ferdinand's line ==
"(to MIRANDA) Oh, if a virgin, And your affection not gone forth, I'll make you The queen of Naples."

When Ferdinand meets Miranda, he falls in love at first sight and confesses his love.

"To whom I am subdued, are but light to me, Might I but through my prison once a day Behold this maid."

Ferdinand is subordinated by Prospero's order, but he gives up his freedom and just wants to see Miranda.

"O heaven, O earth, bear witness to this sound And crown what I profess with kind event If I speak true! If hollowly, invert What best is boded me to mischief! I Beyond all limit of what else i' th' world Do love, prize, honor you."

Ferdinand declares how deeply he loves her when Miranda asks him "Do you love me?"

"(seeing ALONSO and kneeling)Though the seas threaten, they are merciful. I have cursed them without cause."

Ferdinand meets his father, Alonso who has been thought to be dead, and thanks for the miracle. As Ferdinand introduces Miranda to his father, Alonso is very proud of his son for finding such a beautiful love.

== Role in the play ==
In Act 1 Scene 2, Prospero said, "(aside) It goes on, I see, as my soul prompts it ."

This scene shows that Ferdinand and Miranda were used to serving as a union of Milan and Naples by Prospero's political aims for resolving his exile.

Ferdinand may represent the hope of the younger generation who will not repeat the mistakes made by Prospero and Alonso. In Act 5 Scene 1, as they saw Ferdinand and Miranda playing chess together, Alonso told their reconciliation and unification through the marriage.

In (Act 1 Scene 2), when Ferdinand first came out, he mourned over his father's death on the shore. Then, Ariel sang for him, and he thought that the song was for his dead father.

== Cinematic portrayals ==
- Ed Genung played Ferdinand in one of the oldest known screen adaptations of the story, The Tempest (1911).
- Mark Rylance plays Ferdinand in Prospero's Books, a 1991 screen adaptation of The Tempest, directed by Peter Greenaway.
- Eddie Mills plays Captain Frederic, a character based on Ferdinand, in The Tempest (1998 film), which transfers the play's story to the American Civil War
- Reeve Carney plays Ferdinand in the 2010 film.

== Named after ==
On the Uranus system, both the irregular moon and the Mirandan crater (located at the Prime Meridian near the equator) are named for the character.
