= Ed Genung =

American actor

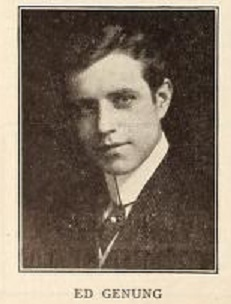
Ed Genung in 1911

Edward Genung (30 August 1881 – 13 July 1944) was an American actor of the silent era notable for being the first actor to play David Copperfield on film - in David Copperfield (1911) and one of the earliest to play Ferdinand on film - in The Tempest (1911).

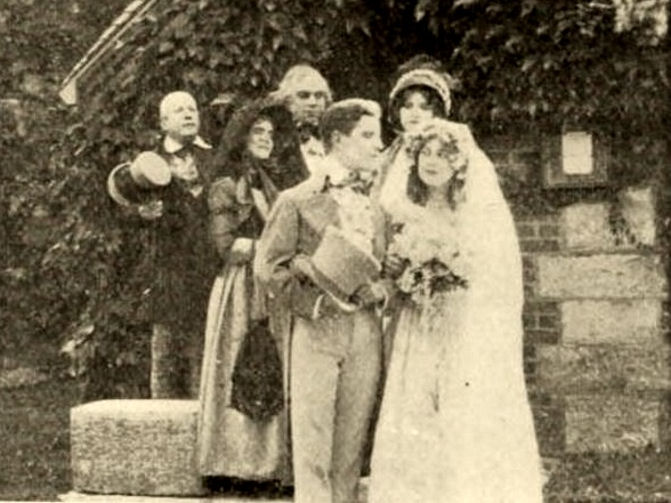
Ed Genung (front) as David Copperfield with Mignon Anderson as Dora Spenlow in David Copperfield (1911)

Genung was born in New Albany, Indiana, to Jones Alfred Genung, a glassworker. He worked in various films for the Thanhouser Company in 1911. In the summer of 1912, he was appearing in films for the Bison Company, while by 1914, he was acting with the Lubin Manufacturing Company.

Genung's other film roles include: Phil Nelson - the Messenger's Brother in Messenger No. 845 (1914); Dick in Dick's Turning (1913); Don in Her First Choice (1912); David Copperfield in The Loves of David Copperfield (1911); The Prizefighter / Aviator in The Higher the Fewer (1911), and The Country Boy in Little Old New York (1911).
