= The Dangerous Paradise =

1920 film directed by William P. S. Earle

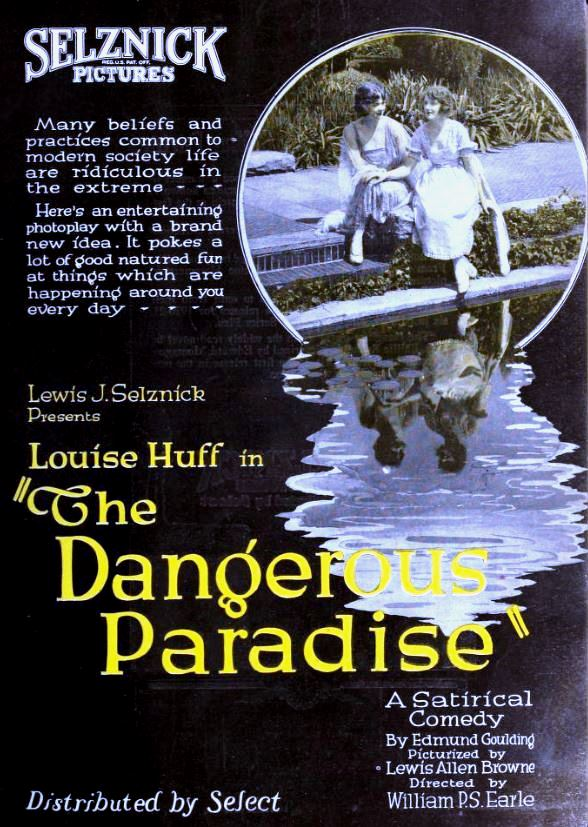
- Directed by: William P.S. Earle
- Written by: Lewis Allen Browne; Edmund Goulding
- Produced by: Lewis J. Selznick
- Starring: Louise Huff; Harry Benham; Ida Darling
- Cinematography: William F. Wagner
- Production company: Selznick Pictures
- Distributed by: Select Pictures
- Release date: October 20, 1920
- Running time: 6 reels
- Country: United States
- Language: Silent (English intertitles)

The Dangerous Paradise is a 1920 American silent comedy drama film directed by William P. S. Earle and starring Louise Huff, Harry Benham, and Ida Darling.

== Cast ==
- Louise Huff as Ivis Van Astor
- Harry Benham as Norman Kent
- Ida Darling as Mrs. Forrester
- John Raymond as Roland Sweet
- Nora Reed as Lolo Stuyvesant
- Templar Saxe as Horatio Worthington
- William Brille as J. Mortimer Potter
- Maude Hill as Mrs. Stanley
