= Miss Robinson Crusoe (1912 film) =

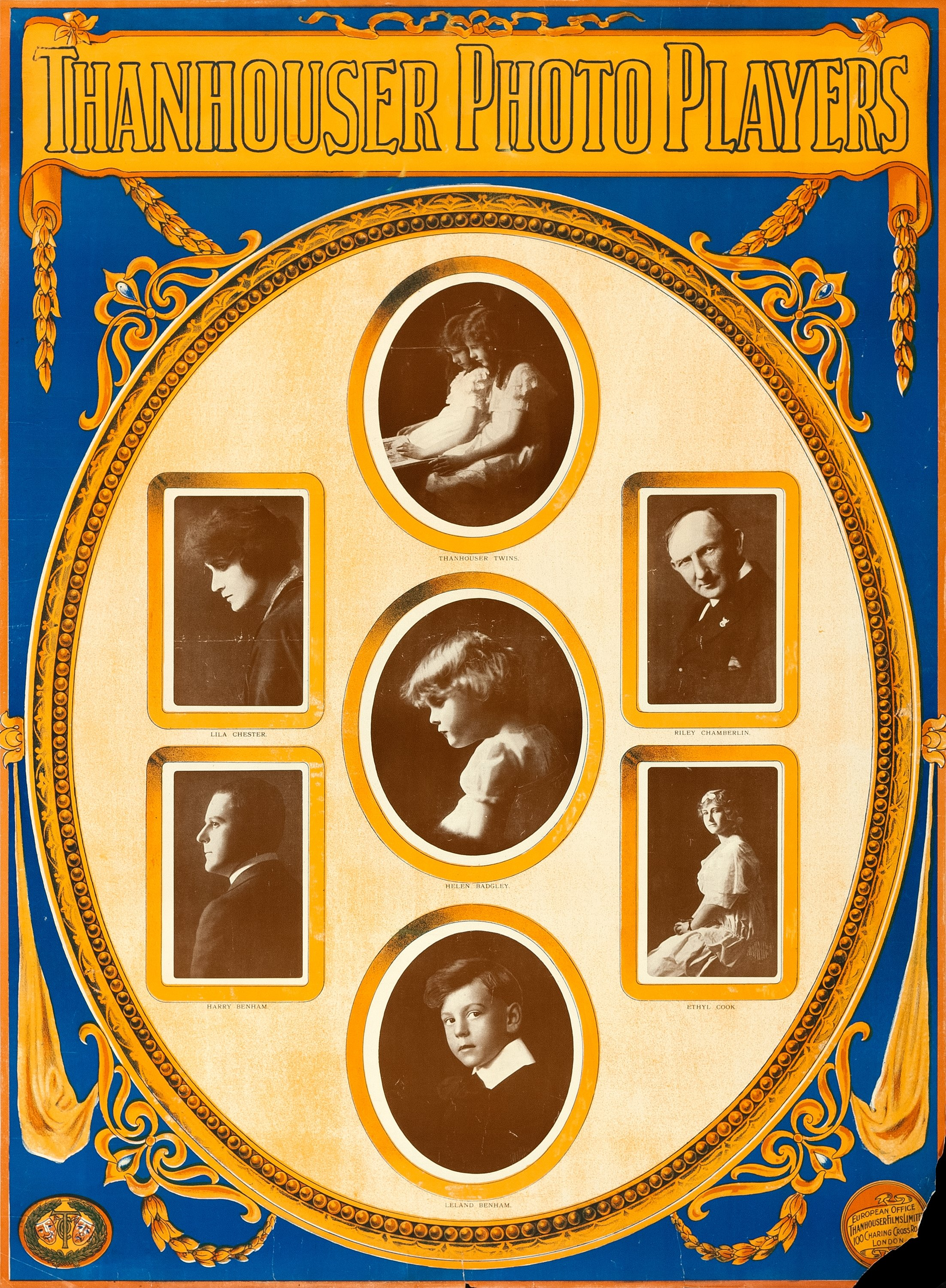
- Thanhouser company actors
- Directed by: Unknown
- Based on: Robinson Crusoe; 1719 novel by Daniel Defoe
- Produced by: Edwin Thanhouser
- Starring: Florence LaBadie; James Cruze; Harry Benham; Francis Newburgh; William Russell; Mignon Anderson
- Distributed by: Thanhouser Company
- Release date: October 8, 1912
- Running time: 2-reels, 1500 feet reel 2, "split-reel"
- Country: United States
- Languages: Silent film English Intertitles

Miss Robinson Crusoe is a 1912 silent film romance-adventure produced by the Thanhouser Company starring Florence LaBadie and James Cruze. The narrative scenario is derived from Daniel Defoe's 1719 adventure novel Robinson Crusoe.

== Plot ==
A well-to-do American couple are traveling abroad with their only daughter. When they discover that a young nobleman is courting her, they arrange for her to accompany the count and his mother on an ocean liner cruise bound for the tropics. The girl's parents hope that she will fall in love on the long voyage, with the prospect that marriage will follow. A wealthy young American has also fallen in love with their daughter. Lacking noble ancestry, the family discourages his advances.

When news arrives that the cruise ship has been lost at sea, the girl is reported among the missing. Distraught, but refusing to believe the love of his life is dead, the American swain embarks on his yacht in search of her. Unbeknownst to him, the girl has survived the disaster and finds herself a castaway on a tiny island occupied solely by hostile indigenous people. The tribes consider killing the intruder, but hesitate when she handles an enormous, venomous snake and survives. The tribal leaders decide she is an enchanted goddess, and commence worshiping her.

After traveling to many strange tropical lands, the young American begins to question if his search is hopeless. Persevering, he lands on a remote island and discovers his sweetheart. A prisoner in her own domain, the inhabitants are loath to relinquish her, and a violent struggle ensues between the young American and the natives to possess her. The couple escape and return home to the United States. The parents, overjoyed at reuniting with their only child, consent to their marriage.

== Cast ==
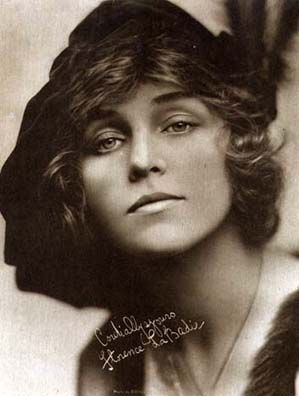
Florence LaBadie

- Florence LaBadie as Miss Robinson Crusoe
- James Cruze as her American rescuer
- Henry Benham as an American
- Francis "Frank" Newburgh as the Nobleman
- William Russell
- Mignon Anderson

== Release ==
Miss Robinson Crusoe was released October 8, 1912. The film was issued on two reels. The first reel ran 1,210 feet. The second reel, a so-called "split-reel" completed the picture. The remainder of the reel provided footage of animals from the New York Zoological Park.

== Reception ==
=== Contemporary ===
"There is such variety to the plays that I never know what I may be called upon to do next. Not long ago I had the lead in Miss Robinson Crusoe. They left me floating on a log, so far out that, though I am a good swimmer, I really wondered if I'd ever get back to land."—Florence LaBadie in Moving Picture Story Magazine, January 1913.

A reviewer for The Moving Picture World, October 19, 1912, after a brief sketch of the plot, declared Miss Robinson Crusoe "a highly artistic picture and, where it fails to be so, it is nevertheless effective, and makes a very desirable offering." The reviewer adds that LaBodie's "handling of a huge rattlesnake makes a most startling scene."

A critic at The Morning Telegraph, October 13, 1912, noted the tropical settings in the film. Allowing that "the photoplay is well carried out to the end," the review concluded by informing readers that "A reel and a half are necessary for the tale."

=== Retrospective appraisal ===
Literature and film critic Edward Wagenknecht declares that Miss Robinson Crusoe "does not deserve to be memorialized; it must have been a terrible picture."

Wagenknecht, who viewed the film upon its release when he was a 12-year-old boy, recalls the film from his juvenile perspective:

I shall never forget it. The heroine (Florence LaBadie) was wrecked on a desert island, after which she appeared dressed in a leopard skin (as I remember it) and nothing more. A large brown snake approached her, and she picked it up and played with it...to my eyes that were not accustomed to seeing bare legs even on little girls she seemed startlingly and wonderfully naked, and her beautiful body combined with the horror of the snake created an impact that was unforgettable.
