= The Man Without a Country (1937 film) =

1937 film

- Directed by: Crane Wilbur
- Written by: Edward Everett Hale; Forrest Barnes
- Based on: The Man Without a Country 1863 story in The Atlantic Monthly by Edward Everett Hale; The Man Without a Country 1917 film by Ernest C. Warde
- Starring: John Litel; Gloria Holden
- Cinematography: Allen M. Davey
- Edited by: Benjamin Liss
- Music by: Howard Jackson
- Distributed by: Warner Bros.
- Release date: November 27, 1937
- Running time: 21 minutes
- Country: United States
- Language: English

The Man Without a Country is a 1937 American short drama film directed by Crane Wilbur in Technicolor. It was nominated for an Academy Award at the 10th Academy Awards in 1937 for Best Short Subject (Color). This film is preserved in the Library of Congress.

It is a remake of the 1917 film of the same name, based on the 1863 short story by Edward Everett Hale. Actor Holmes Herbert appeared in both versions. A 1925 Fox film based on the story and directed by Rowland V. Lee is now considered to be a lost film.

== Cast ==
- John Litel as Lt. Philip Nolan
- Gloria Holden as Marian Morgan
- Ted Osborne as Jack Morgan
- Donald Brian as Col. Morgan
- Holmes Herbert as Aaron Burr
- Erville Alderson as Andrew Jackson (uncredited)
- Wilfred Lucas as Lincoln's Secretary (uncredited)
- Charles Middleton as Abraham Lincoln (uncredited)
