= Mignon Anderson =

American actress (1892–1983)

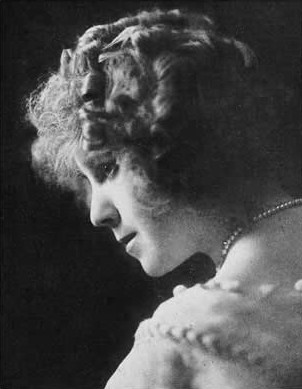
- Anderson in 1916
- Born: March 31, 1892; Baltimore, Maryland, U.S.
- Died: February 25, 1983 (aged 90); Burbank, California, U.S.
- Resting place: Forest Lawn Memorial Park
- Occupation: Actress
- Spouse: J. Morris Foster (m. 1915; died 1966)

Mignon Anderson (March 31, 1892 – February 25, 1983) was an American film and stage actress. Her career was at its peak in the 1910s.

== Early years ==
Born in Baltimore, Anderson was the daughter of Hallie Howard and Frank Anderson, who were also actors. She grew up in New York City and acted on stage before she ventured into films.

== Career ==
In 1911, she joined Thanhouser Studios in New Rochelle, New York. She was very diminutive and a blonde. Anderson starred alongside William Garwood in a number of short films including A New Cure for Divorce in 1912.

She began working for Universal Pictures in January 1917. A year later, she left Universal and thereafter worked on a freelance basis. Her final film was Kisses (1922).

== Personal life and death ==
Anderson's engagement to actor Irving Cummings ended because her family did not want her to marry a Jew and his family opposed his marrying a gentile. Playing in Thanhouser films brought about an acquaintance with Morris Foster, also of that company. She was married to Foster from 1915 until his death in 1966.

On February 25, 1983, Anderson died in Burbank, California at the age of 90, and was laid to rest on the Forest Lawn Memorial Park (Hollywood Hills).

== Filmography ==
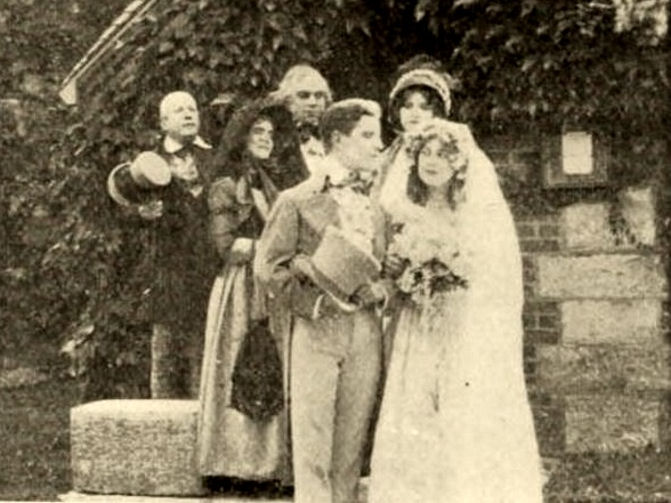
Ed Genung (front) as David Copperfield with Mignon Anderson as Dora Spenlow in David Copperfield (1911)

- The Winter's Tale (1910)
- Robert Emmet (1911)
- Silas Marner (1911)
- The Pied Piper of Hamelin (1911)
- David Copperfield (1911)
- A Master of Millions (1911)
- As It Was in the Beginning (1912)
- Nicholas Nickleby (1912)
- The Star of the Side Show (1912)
- Dora Thorne (1912)
- Her Secret (1912)
- On the Stroke of Five (1912)
- Farm and Flat (1912)
- The Finger of Scorn (1912)
- The Merchant of Venice (1912)
- Treasure Trove (1912)
- A New Cure for Divorce (1912)
- Old Doctor Judd (1912)
- Big Sister (1912)
- When a Count Counted (1912)
- Lucile (1912)
- Orator, Knight and Cow Charmer (1912)
- At the Foot of the Ladder (1912)
- Please Help the Pore (1912)
- Miss Robinson Crusoe (1912)
- When Mercy Tempers Justice (1912)
- The Truant's Doom (1912)
- The Thunderbolt (1912)
- Standing Room Only (1912)
- A Will and a Way (1912)
- At Liberty—Good Press Agent (1912)
- With the Mounted Police (1912)
- Just a Shabby Doll (1913)
- King René's Daughter (1913)
- Little Dorrit (1913)
- Robin Hood (1913)
- A Daughter Worth While (1913)
- The Plot Against the Governor (1913)
- A Clothes-Line Quarrel (1913)
- A Beauty Parlor Graduate (1913)
- Pamela Congreve (1914)
- Two Little Dromios (1914)
- Turkey Trot Town (1914)
- The Elusive Diamond (1914)
- Why Reginald Reformed (1914)
- The Golden Cross (1914)
- The Scientist's Doll (1914)
- Guilty or Not Guilty (1914)
- When Sorrow Fades (1914)
- The Tin Soldier and the Dolls (1914)
- Beating Back (1914)
- When Algy Froze Up (1914)
- From the Flames (1914)
- Getting Rid of Algy (1914)
- Lost: A Union Suit (1914)
- A Dog of Flanders (1914)
- Rivalry (1914)
- The Man Without Fear (1914)
- The Million Dollar Mystery (Cameo, 1914)
- The Harlow Handicap (1914)
- The Substitute (1914/III)
- The Messenger of Death (1914)
- The Guiding Hand (1914)
- Stronger Than Death (1914)
- Conscience (1914/II)
- Jean of the Wilderness (1914)
- The Terror of Anger (1914)
- A Denver Romance (1914)
- Naidra, the Dream Woman (1914)
- When East Meets West (1914)
- A Hatful of Trouble (1914)
- Lucy's Elopement (1914)
- The Bridal Bouquet (1915)
- Her Menacing Past (1915)
- An Inside Tip (1915)
- A Yellowstone Honeymoon (1915)
- In the Jury Room (1915)
- The Shoplifter (1915)
- The Magnet of Destruction (1915)
- The Reformation of Peter and Paul (1915)
- A Scientific Mother (1915)
- The Song of the Heart (1915)
- The House That Jack Moved (1915)
- The Girl of the Sea (1915)
- Innocence at Monte Carlo (1915)
- A Maker of Guns (1915)
- Madame Blanche, Beauty Doctor (1915)
- Dot on the Day Line Boat (1915)
- Outcasts of Society (1915)
- Milestones of Life (1915)
- The Revenge of the Steeple-Jack (1915)
- A Message Through Flames (1915)
- The Price of Her Silence (1915)
- John T. Rocks and the Flivver (1915)
- At the Patrician Club (1915)
- The Mill on the Floss (1915)
- The Woman in Politics (1916)
- The Knotted Cord (1916)
- The City of Illusion (1916)
- Her Husband's Wife (1916/I)
- Pamela's Past (1916)
- Perils of the Secret Service (1917)
- Even As You and I (1917)
- The Phantom's Secret (1917)
- A Young Patriot (1917)
- The Circus of Life (1917)
- The Hunted Man (1917)
- Meet My Wife (1917)
- A Wife on Trial (1917)
- The Master Spy (1917)
- The Claim (1918)
- The Shooting Party (1918)
- The Secret Peril (1919)
- The Midnight Stage (1919)
- Blind Man's Eyes (1919)
- Marry My Wife (1919)
- The House of Intrigue (1919)
- King Spruce (1920)
- Mountain Madness (1920)
- The Heart of a Woman (1920)
- Cupid's Brand (1921)
- Kisses (1922)
