= Her Life and His =

1917 film by Frederic Richard Sullivan

- Directed by: Frederick Sullivan
- Written by: Philip Lonergan
- Produced by: Edwin Thanhouser
- Starring: Florence La Badie; Holmes Herbert; Ethyle Cooke
- Cinematography: Charles W. Hoffman
- Production company: Thanhouser Film Corporation
- Distributed by: Pathé Exchange
- Release date: February 18, 1917
- Running time: 50 minutes
- Country: United States
- Languages: Silent; English intertitles

Her Life and His is a 1917 American silent drama film directed by Frederick Sullivan and starring Florence La Badie, Holmes Herbert and Ethyle Cooke.

== Cast ==
- Florence La Badie as Mary Murdock
- Holmes Herbert as Ralph Howard
- Ethyle Cooke as Mrs. Nan Travers
- Harris Gordon as Undetermined Role
- Samuel N. Niblack as Emmett Conger
- Arthur Bauer as Undetermined Role
- Jean La Motte as Undetermined Role
- Justus D. Barnes as Political Boss
- Joseph Phillips as Undetermined Role

== Bibliography ==
- Robert B. Connelly. The Silents: Silent Feature Films, 1910-36, Volume 40, Issue 2. December Press, 1998.
