= Convict 993 =

- Directed by: William Parke
- Written by: Wallace Clifton
- Produced by: Astra Film
- Starring: Irene Castle
- Cinematography: Arthur C. Miller
- Distributed by: Pathé Exchange
- Release date: January 6, 1918
- Running time: 5 reels
- Country: USA
- Language: Silent..English titles

Convict 993 is a lost 1918 silent film directed by William Parke and starring Irene Castle. It was distributed by the Pathé Exchange Company.

== Cast ==
- Irene Castle as Roslyn Ayre
- Warner Oland as Dan Mallory
- Helene Chadwick as Neva Stokes
- Harry Benham as Rodney Travers
- J. H. Gilmour as Bob Ainslee
- Paul Everton as Jim Morton
- Bert Starkey as Bill Avery
- Ethyle Cooke as Stella Preston
