= A New Cure for Divorce =

- Written by: Lloyd Lonergan
- Produced by: Thanhouser Company
- Starring: William Garwood; Mignon Anderson
- Distributed by: Film Supply Company
- Release date: August 2, 1912
- Country: United States
- Languages: Silent film English intertitles

A New Cure for Divorce is a 1912 American silent short drama film written by Lloyd Lonergan. The film stars William Garwood and Mignon Anderson.

== Cast ==
- William Garwood as The Groom
- Mignon Anderson as The Bride
