= The Prey (1920 film) =

1920 film

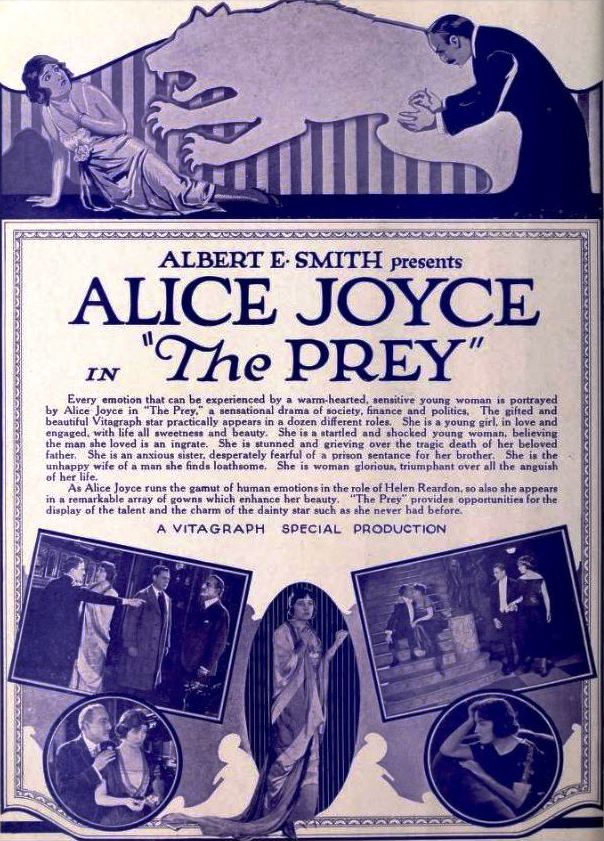
- Directed by: George L. Sargent
- Written by: Calder Johnstone; Joseph Le Brandt
- Produced by: Albert E. Smith
- Starring: Alice Joyce; Henry Hallam; Harry Benham
- Cinematography: Joseph Shelderfer
- Production company: Vitagraph Company of America
- Distributed by: Vitagraph Company of America
- Release date: September 1920
- Running time: 60 minutes
- Country: United States
- Languages: Silent; English intertitles

The Prey is a 1920 American silent drama film directed by George L. Sargent and starring Alice Joyce, Henry Hallam and Harry Benham. It is now considered a lost film.

== Cast ==
- Alice Joyce as Helen Reardon
- Henry Hallam as Robert Reardon
- Jack McLean as Jack Reardon
- Harry Benham as James Calvin
- L. Rogers Lytton as Henry C. Lowe
- H.H. Pattee as Nathan Sloane
- William H. Turner as Williard
- Cecil Kern as Jesse
- Roy Applegate as Pete Canard

== Bibliography ==
- Connelly, Robert B. The Silents: Silent Feature Films, 1910-36, Volume 40, Issue 2. December Press, 1998.
- Munden, Kenneth White. The American Film Institute Catalog of Motion Pictures Produced in the United States, Part 1. University of California Press, 1997.
