= Adrift in a Great City =

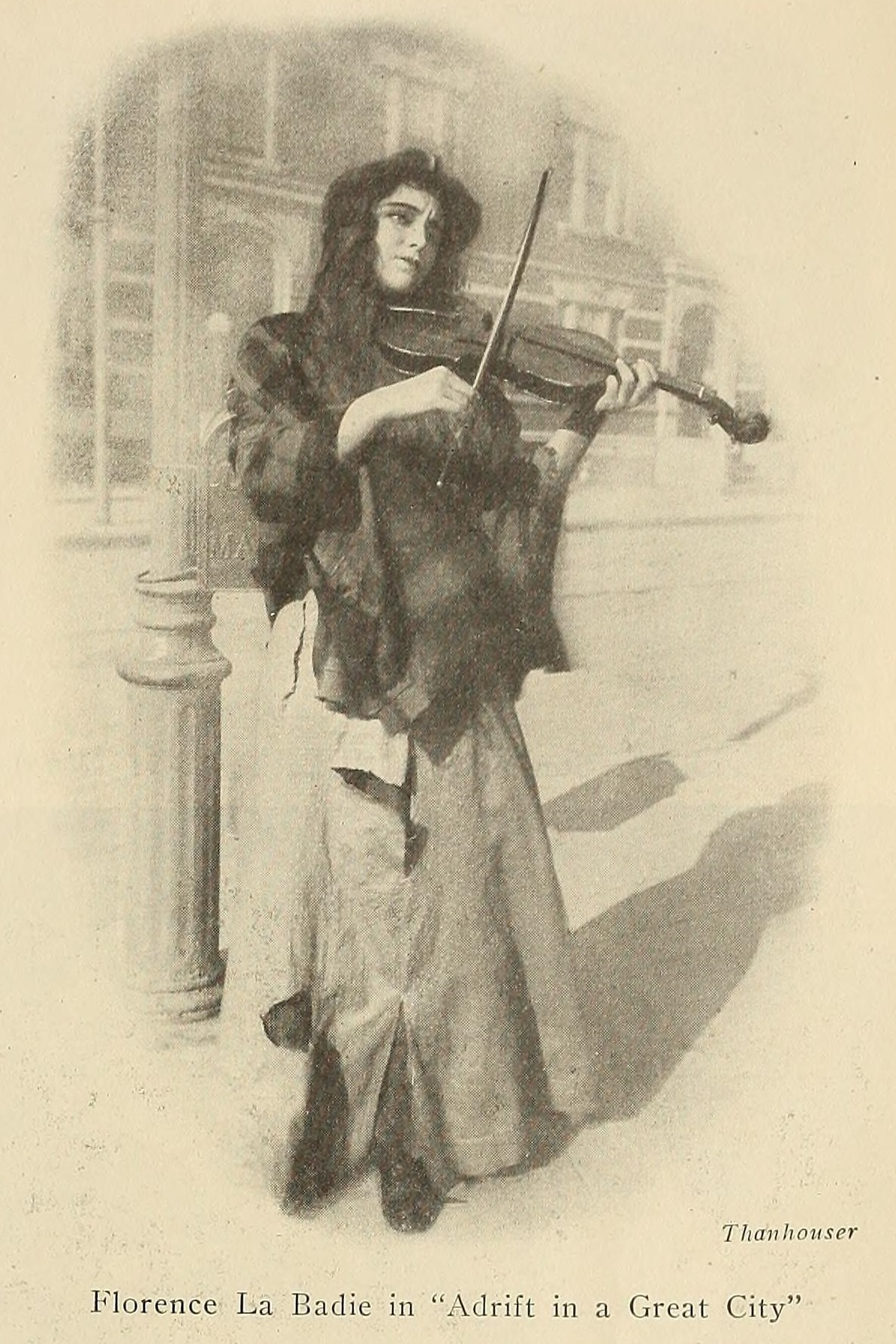
- Florence La Badie in Adrift in a Great City
- Produced by: Thanhouser Company
- Release date: January 13, 1914
- Country: United States
- Languages: Silent film English intertitles

Adrift in a Great City is a 1914 American silent short drama produced by the Thanhouser Film Corporation that stars Florence LaBadie. The film begins with Pat Moran who pays for the passage of his wife and daughter to join him in America, but he is seriously injured on the way to greeting them. Left by themselves, the daughter works in a sweatshop and goes blind, forcing her and her mother to become beggars. By pure happenstance, the blind girl wanders to the hospital where her father is recovering and tells her story to a doctor. The father recognizes the girl as his daughter and the family is reunited, and the doctor confirms her blindness can be cured. The film was reviewed negatively by critics for its poor scenario, settings and technical execution. The film is presumed lost.

== Plot ==
Pat Moran, the foreman of a construction gang, worked hard to save up enough money to pay for the passage of his wife and daughter to their new home in America. On the day of their arrival, he heads to the pier to greet them and becomes involved in a serious accident. He is injured and taken unconscious to the hospital as an unidentified patient. His wife and daughter know nothing of what has befallen him and struggle to live in the city. The daughter gets a position in a sweatshop, and her eyesight deteriorates until she is unable to work anymore. Now blind, she resorts to playing the violin for money while her mother becomes a beggar.

As Pat Moran recovers in the hospital, he sends messengers out to contact his wife and child, but they all fail to find them. One day, the blind girl has lost her way and stumbles into the hospital grounds. She encounters the doctor and tells him of her story and plight. Weakly reclining in a chair nearby, Pat Moran overhears her and recognizes the girl as his daughter. The grief of the separated family abates with their reunion and doctor's assurance that the blind girl that her sight can be restored.

== Cast ==
- Florence LaBadie as the blind girl / Kathleen Moran
- Sidney Bracy as Pat Moran – the prosperous father
- Arthur Bauer as the doctor
- Lila Chester as a nurse

== Production ==
The scenario was written by Lloyd F. Lonergan, but the director of the film is uncredited. Little is known of the production, but a review in The New York Dramatic Mirror made the assumption that the scenes were shot in the morning. The film starred Florence La Badie, who was the most prominent player of the Thanhouser Company and frequently in the leading roles of films including The Million Dollar Mystery which would captivate the United States. The role of the father was played, Sidney Bracy, was a stage actor of considerable experience who claimed to have been affiliated with the Thanhouser players since 1910. Though Q. David Bowers says that it is probably an incorrect assertion, it is possible that Bracy may not have been a full-time member of the company. Bracy's first credited work appears in 1913, but it would not be until The Million Dollar Mystery that Bracy would garner much attention in the role of Jones, the Butler. The role of the doctor was played by Arthur Bauer who was a veteran of the stage and film, through the Great Northern Film Company, before signing onto the Thanhouser Company. The announcement of Bauer's role at Thanhouser came after the release of sixteen films, including Adrift in the Great City, on March 21, 1914. Lila Chester, played the role of a nurse in the production. Chester was claimed by a Thanhouser publicist to have appeared in over 400 films by February 14, 1914. Bowers reasons that if these productions were with Thanhouser, than most of them had to be minor roles because of the lack of attention and credits she was given. The one reel drama film, approximately 1008 feet long, was filmed in New York City and New Rochelle, New York.

== Release and reception ==
The film was released in the United States on January 13, 1914, and later in Britain on April 13, 1914. The film had a wide release in the United States with showings in Kansas, Pennsylvania, Maryland, Indiana, North Carolina, Texas, Kentucky, Wisconsin, and Missouri.

The film was met with negative reviews by critics and mixed enthusiasm by theater proprietors. The Morning Telegraph found it unbelievable and only for the sake of the plot that family would be reunited by happenstance. The Moving Picture World was negative finding that it was not a strong offering because of the plot and the camerawork having resulted in a cloudy image quality in parts of the production. The New York Dramatic Mirror found the concept of the plot to be interesting, but the execution to have been poorly executed. The review found that the production was crude, cheap and unconvincing because the set was bare and lacked the presence of onlookers on the city scenes. Advertisers like the Majestic theater of Wellington, Kansas, would prompt it as a "well told story". The Empire in Frederick, Maryland, would be equally promotional and appeal to the audience as having pretty girls in the cast. The Edisonia in Durham, North Carolina, advertised the film as a strong Thanhouser drama that was "thrilling, pathetic, interesting". The film is presumed lost.

== Notes ==
The plot was reconstructed from the Reel Life synopsis that is included Q. David Bowers' Thanhouser Films: An Encyclopedia and History Volume 2: Filmography and the synopsis published in Moving Picture World. Two aspects of the plot have been reported in reviews that are not reflected in the article's plot section because neither is in the published synopsizes. The review by The Morning Telegraph states that has both the blind girl and mother wander onto the hospital grounds. The review in The New York Dramatic Mirror states that the father was unconscious in a restaurant and not a hospital.
