= The Man Without a Country =

Short story by Edward Everett Hale

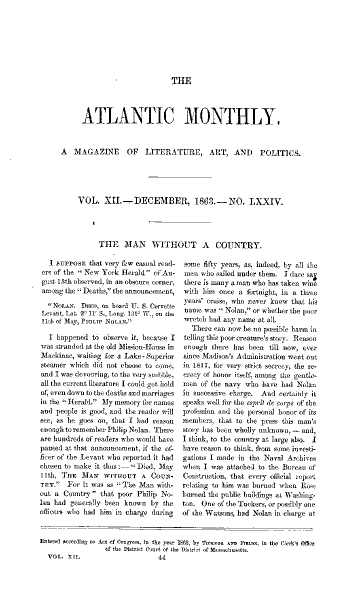
"The Man Without a Country" was first published in The Atlantic Monthly in the December 1863 issue

"The Man Without a Country" is a short story by American writer Edward Everett Hale, first published in The Atlantic in December 1863. It is the story of a young American officer who declares himself disgusted with his country during a trial for treason, and wishes he never hears about her ever again. He is sentenced to spend the rest of his days at sea without so much as a word of news about the United States.

== Plot summary ==
The protagonist is a young US Army lieutenant, Philip Nolan, who develops a friendship with the visiting Aaron Burr. When Burr is tried for treason, (Note: Burr was indeed tried for treason.) Nolan is tried as an accomplice. During his testimony, he bitterly renounces his nation and, "in an intemperate outburst" shouts

Damn the United States! I wish I may never hear of the United States again!

The judge is shocked by that statement and, convicting Nolan, grants him literally his wish. Nolan is to spend the rest of his life aboard US Navy warships in exile, with no right ever to set foot on US soil again and with explicit orders that no one shall ever again mention his country to him or bring him news about her.

The sentence is carried out to the letter. For the rest of his life, Nolan travels on ship, is transported from ship to ship, lives as a prisoner on the high seas, and is never allowed out in a home port. Though he is treated according to his former rank, nothing of his country is ever mentioned to him. None of the sailors in whose custody Nolan remains is allowed to speak to him about the US, and his newspapers are censored. Nolan is unrepentant at first, but over the years, he becomes sadder and wiser and desperate for news. One day, as he is being transferred to another ship, he beseeches a young sailor never to make the same mistake that he had: "Remember, boy, that behind all these men... behind officers and government, and people even, there is the Country Herself, your Country, and that you belong to her as you belong to your own mother. Stand by her, boy, as you would stand by your mother...!" On one such ship, he attends a party in which he dances with a young lady he had once known. He then beseeches her to tell him something, anything, about the US, but she withdraws and no longer speaks to him.

Deprived of news of his homeland, Nolan misses it more than his friends or family, art or music, or love or nature. Dying aboard the USS Levant, he shows his room to an officer, Danforth. It is "a little shrine" where the Stars and Stripes are draped around a picture of George Washington. Over his bed, Nolan has painted a bald eagle, with lightning "blazing from his beak" and claws grasping the globe. At the foot of his bed is an outdated map of the United States, showing many of its old territories that had, in the meantime, unbeknownst to him, been admitted to statehood. Nolan smiles, "Here, you see, I have a country!"

The dying man asks to be told the news of American history since 1807, and Danforth finally relates to him almost every major event that has happened to the US since his sentence was imposed; the narrator confesses, however, "I could not make up my mouth to tell him a word about this infernal rebellion." (Note: Meaning the Civil War.) Nolan asks officer Danforth to bring Nolan's copy of the Presbyterian Book of Public Prayer and to read the words at the page at which it readily opens:

Most heartily we beseech Thee with Thy favor to behold and bless Thy servant, the President of the United States, and all others in authority.

Nolan says, "I have repeated those prayers night and morning, it is now fifty-five years." Every day, he had read of the US but only in the form of a prayer to uphold its leaders, since the US Navy had neglected to keep that book from him.

Nolan asks Danforth that he be buried in the sea and have a gravestone placed in memory of him at Fort Adams, Mississippi, or at New Orleans. When he dies later that day, he is found to have drafted the epitaph for himself: "In memory of PHILIP NOLAN, Lieutenant in the Army of the United States. He loved his country as no other man has loved her; but no man deserved less at her hands."

== Influence ==
Clifton Fadiman wrote in his 1949 introduction to the book Masterpieces of World Literature, that no story expresses the spirit of American nationalism better than The Man without a Country.

Hale published "The Man Without a Country" in the Atlantic Monthly in 1863 to bolster support for the Union in the North. In this first publication, Hale's name does not appear at the beginning or end of the story, though it appears in the annual index at the end of that issue of the magazine. It was later collected in 1868 in the book The Man Without a Country, and Other Tales, published by Ticknor and Fields.

Danforth's summary to Nolan of American history from 1807 to 1860 is an outline of the Northern case for preservation of the Union. The young country is shown standing up fearlessly to the global superpower, Great Britain; expanding to North America's Pacific coast; developing new contributions to human knowledge such as the Smithsonian Institution; and developing new technology such as steamboats.

Hale convinced many readers that Nolan was an actual figure, thus increasing the story's effectiveness as a piece of patriotic literature. Years later he stated that the story, at least in part, was "testimony" against the election of 1863, in which Clement Vallandigham (1820–71), an ardent antiwar, pro-Confederate, anti–"King Lincoln" Ohio Democrat, was running for office from exile in Canada, and who, at his own earlier treason trial, like the fictional Nolan, expressed his disgust with the United States.

By frequently mentioning specific dates and places and by using numerous contemporary references, Hale grounded his story in a firm foundation of history and made the story seem like a record of actual events. In his 1893 and 1900 reminiscences, E. E. Hale stated, "To write the story of 'The Man Without a Country' and its sequel, 'Philip Nolan’s Friends', I had to make as careful a study as I could have the history of the acquisition of Louisiana by the United States."

The story's conclusion hinges upon the titular character's possession of the Presbyterian Book of Public Prayer, which had not been published until 1857. This indicates that Nolan having read from the book on a daily basis since the beginning of his sentence in 1807 was implausible.

The name "Philip Nolan" belonged to the business secretary and bookkeeper for James Wilkinson, a Spanish spy who was first an associate of Aaron Burr and then an informer on Burr. The spy's bookkeeper Nolan was killed by the Spanish Army while he was stealing Texas mustangs in 1801, years before Burr's trial.

== Monument ==
A monument "in memory of" Nolan and bearing his self-written epitaph was placed in front of the Covington County Courthouse in Andalusia, Alabama, on July 4, 1975, by the Altrusa Club of Andalusia. The monument was placed as part of the Andalusia Bicentennial Committee's official activities commemorating the United States Bicentennial.

== Adaptations ==
Cover of the Classics Illustrated issue with the story (1943)

Elizabeth McFadden and Agnes Louise Crimmins wrote the "historical drama" theatrical play "The Man Without a Country" in 1918, published by Samuel French in New York City.

"The Man Without a Country" has been adapted in film several times, starting in 1917 with The Man Without a Country starring Florence La Badie, a 1918 film titled My Own United States, one in 1925, and another Man Without a Country starring John Litel and Gloria Holden and released by Warner Brothers in 1937. Also in 1937, an opera of the story, eponymously titled, was composed by Walter Damrosch and premiered at the Metropolitan Opera in 1937.

On September 30, 1943, the horror/thriller radio program The Weird Circle presented an adaptation of the story. Bill Johnstone, best known as Orson Welles' replacement as the title character in The Shadow radio drama, narrated and took part in the story as Hale.

A four-part dramatization was recorded in June 1947 and issued by Decca on two coupled 12" 78 rpm discs. Bing Crosby provided the narration and Frank Lovejoy portrayed Philip Nolan. Later that same year on November 26, a dramatization was performed on Philco Radio Time, with Crosby (the program's star and host) again providing narration.

In 1949, the Classics Illustrated series published the story in issue #63, illustrated by Henry C. Kiefer, an artist who "defined the Classics style." The story was later re-published with a cover by Alex Blum.

The Railroad Hour presented a 30-minute adaptation of "The Man Without a Country" on June 28, 1953. Gordon MacRae and Dorothy Warenskjold starred in the broadcast.

In Sam Fuller's film Run of the Arrow (1957), Captain Clark (Brian Keith), a U.S. Army engineer commissioned to build a fort on Sioux territory, relates the Nolan story to O'Meara (Rod Steiger), a Southerner who, refusing to accept the defeat of the Confederacy, has married among the Sioux and been appointed by them to see the fort is built where agreed. In the context of pressing O'Meara to decide whether his loyalties lie ultimately with the Sioux or with the Americans, Clark narrates the Nolan story as historical fact.

In 1973, a made-for-television movie was written by Sidney Carroll and directed by Delbert Mann. It featured Cliff Robertson as Philip Nolan, Beau Bridges as Frederick Ingham, Peter Strauss as Arthur Danforth, Robert Ryan as Lt. Cmdr. Vaughan, Walter Abel as Col. A. B. Morgan, Geoffrey Holder as one of the slaves on a slave ship, Shepperd Strudwick as the Secretary of the Navy, John Cullum as Aaron Burr, and Patricia Elliott as Mrs. Graff.

In May 1977, a three-act radio play was broadcast as an episode of Himan Brown's The General Mills Radio Adventure Theater. Russell Horton performed the part of Nolan while Tom Bosley hosted the series.

In 2016, Chuck Pfarrer penned a historical novel entitled Philip Nolan: The Man Without a Country for the U.S. Naval Institute Press.

== Bibliography ==
- Adams, John R. (1977). Edward Everett Hale. Twayne's United States authors. Twayne Publishers. ISBN 978-0805771862.
- Lawson, Melinda (December 2002). "A Profound National Devotion: The Civil War Union Leagues and the Construction of a New National Patriotism". Civil War History. 48 (4). The Kent State University Press: 338–62. doi:10.1353/cwh.2002.0059. "Although Hale was the sole author of this patriotic parable, his message was part of a larger mission assumed by the elite metropolitan Union Leagues in Philadelphia, New York, and Boston. Begun as gentlemen's clubs in the midst of the social chaos generated by sectional conflict and civil war, these leagues quickly acquired a more complex character. The leagues brought an embattled intellectual and professional elite together with powerful business interests."
