= Justus D. Barnes =

American actor (1862–1946)

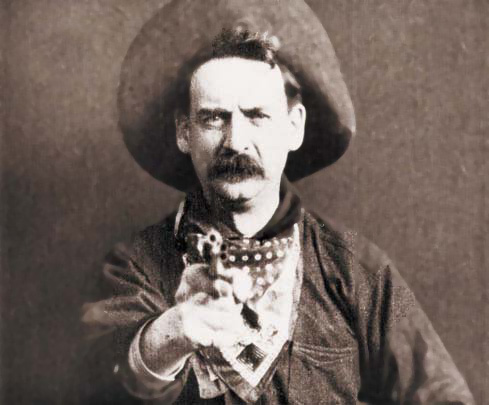
- Barnes in The Great Train Robbery (1903)
- Born: October 2, 1862; Little Falls, New York, U.S.
- Died: February 6, 1946 (aged 83); Weedsport, New York, U.S.
- Resting place: Weedsport Rural Cemetery
- Occupation: Actor
- Years active: 1903–1917

Justus D. Barnes (October 2, 1862 – February 6, 1946), named George Barnes in some sources, was an American stage and film actor. He is best known for his role in the 1903 silent short The Great Train Robbery, which the American Film Institute and many film historians and critics recognize as the production that first established both the Western and action genres, setting a new "narrative standard" in the motion picture industry. Kim Newman says it is "probably the first Western film with a storyline".

== Career ==
Barnes was born in Little Falls, New York. His father was an immigrant from Scotland, while his mother was born in New York. He was a veteran stage actor before he made his screen debut in 1903 in The Great Train Robbery. In that film's memorable ending, Barnes points his pistol at the camera and slowly fires all six shots at the viewer. The Great Train Robbery became one of the most successful and best known commercial films of the early silent era.

In July 1908, Barnes was hired as an actor in the stock company of the Edison Manufacturing Company, the film production company owned by Thomas Edison. In 1910, he signed on with the Thanhouser Company in New Rochelle, New York. Between 1910 and 1917, Barnes appeared in more than seventy films for the Thanhouser, usually in the role of a villain. He played Ham Peggotty in David Copperfield, the earliest known film adaption of the 1850 novel by Charles Dickens. He also played supporting roles in Nicholas Nickleby (1912), Aurora Floyd (1912), and A Dog of Flanders (1914).

In 1917, he was released from the Thanhouser Company due to the company's financial issues. Barnes made his final onscreen appearance for the Edison Studio in Cy Whittaker's Ward, in 1917.

== Later years and death ==
After retiring from acting, Barnes moved to Weedsport, New York, where he worked as a milkman. He later owned a cigar store. Barnes died on February 6, 1946, in Weedsport at the age of 83. He is buried in Weedsport Rural Cemetery, in Weedsport, New York.

== Tributes ==
Barnes appears on a postage stamp issued in 1988 to honor The Great Train Robbery.

== Selected filmography ==
Year	Title	Role	Notes
1903	The Great Train Robbery	Bandit who fires at camera	Uncredited
1910	Young Lord Stanley	The girl's father	Alternative title: His Only Son
1911	The Declaration of Independence	Samuel Adams	
1911	David Copperfield	Ham Peggotty	
1912	On Probation	The Rich Old Widower	
1912	Nicholas Nickleby	Nicholas' Uncle Ralph	
1912	The Baby Bride	The Minister	
1912	When Mandy Came to Town	The Father	
1912	The Portrait of Lady Anne	Lady Anne's Father in 1770	
1912	Cousins	Father on Farm	
1912	The Voice of Conscience	Doctor	Credited as Justice Barnes
1912	Aurora Floyd	Aurora's father	
1912	The Star of Bethlehem	Gaspar, a Magi	
1912	With the Mounted Police	Mounted Policeman	
1913	When the Studio Burned	Director	
1913	While Mrs. McFadden Looked Out	Mr. McFadden	
1913	For Another's Sin	Bank Examiner	
1913	A Victim of Circumstances	The Father	
1913	When Darkness Came	The Senior Partner	
1913	The Farmer's Daughters	Father	
1913	He Couldn't Lose	Green, a lawyer	
1913	A Beauty Parlor Graduate	Uncle Bill	
1913	An Amateur Animal Trainer	Belle's father	
1914	Joseph in the Land of Egypt	Undetermined role	
1914	Percy's First Holiday	Undetermined role	Uncredited
1914	A Leak in the Foreign Office	Abdool – Trevor's Afghan companion	
1914	A Can of Baked Beans	Mr. Morton	
1914	Their Best Friend	Jack's Father	
1914	Cardinal Richelieu's Ward	Huguet	Credited as Justus Barnes
1914	A Debut in the Secret Service	Abdul	
1914	The Infant Heart Snatcher	The Judge	
1914	The Mohammedan's Conspiracy	Abdul	
1914	A Dog of Flanders	The Rich Miller	Lost film
1914	From the Shadows	Stage Manager	Alternative title: Out of the Shadows
1914	His Enemy	John Baird	
1914	The Harlow Handicap	George Carnes	
1914	Arty, the Artist	Mr. Miles – May's Father	
1914	Gold	The Village Bully	
1914	The Mettle of a Man	John Ross	
1914	The Harvest of Regrets	Mr. Sheldon	
1914	The Diamond of Disaster	The Bandit	
1914	Lucy's Elopement	Ezra Jenkins	
1915	The Home of Silence	Ralph's father	
1915	Helen Intervenes	Store Manager	
1915	The Smuggled Diamond	Chief of the Secret Service	
1915	The Adventure of Florence	Mr. Clark – Florence's Father	
1915	The Final Reckoning	Judge Granger	
1915	Bianca Forgets	Bianca's father	
1915	Love and Money	The American Suitor's Father	
1915	The Heart of the Princess Marsari	Paul's Wealthy Uncle	
1915	God's Witness	Judge	Lost film
1915	Bud Blossom	Bud's grandfather	
1915	The Country Girl	The Squire, her Guardian	
1915	Old Jane of the Gaiety	Choreographer	
1915	His Two Patients	The Blacksmith	
1915	The Marvelous Marathoner	Ewing Webster	
1915	Snapshots	Henry Spear – Editor	
1915	From the River's Depths	William Hewins – Dorothy's Father	Alternative title: A Call from the Dead
1915	Weary Walker's Woes	Lawyer	
1915	Mr Meeson's Will	Mr. Meeson	
1916	Outwitted	The Contractor	
1916	Fear	Jasper	
1916	Arabella's Prince	The Prince	
1917	Her Life and His	Political Boss	
1917	Hinton's Double	Detective Denton	
1917	The Candy Girl	Officer Quinn	
1917	An Amateur Orphan	Dave's Father	Credited as Justus Barnes
1917	It Happened to Adele	Vincent's Uncle	
1917	Cy Whittaker's Ward	Simmons	Credited as J.D. Barnes

== Bibliography ==
- Newman, Kim (1990). Wild West Movies. London: Bloomsbury Publishing Ltd. ISBN 978-07-47507-47-5.
