= The Phantom's Secret =

- Directed by: Charles Swickard
- Written by: J. Grubb Alexander
- Starring: Hayward Mack; Mignon Anderson; Mark Fenton
- Cinematography: Harry McGuire Stanley
- Production company: Universal Pictures
- Distributed by: Universal Pictures
- Release date: May 14, 1917
- Running time: 50 minutes
- Country: United States
- Languages: Silent; English intertitles

The Phantom's Secret is a 1917 American silent mystery film directed by Charles Swickard and starring Hayward Mack, Mignon Anderson and Mark Fenton.

== Cast ==
- Hayward Mack as Franz Leroux
- Mignon Anderson as Jeanne de Beaulieu
- Mark Fenton as Count de Beaulieu
- Daniel Leighton as The Rat
- Molly Malone as Jane Elliott
- Lee Shumway as Henry Marston
- Fred Church as Frank Van Dyke
- Nellie Allen as Sister
- Nanine Wright as Mrs. Lavinia Marston

== Bibliography ==
- John T. Soister, Henry Nicolella, Steve Joyce. American Silent Horror, Science Fiction and Fantasy Feature Films, 1913-1929. McFarland, 2014.
