= The Last of the Mohicans (1911 film) =

1911 film by Theodore Marston

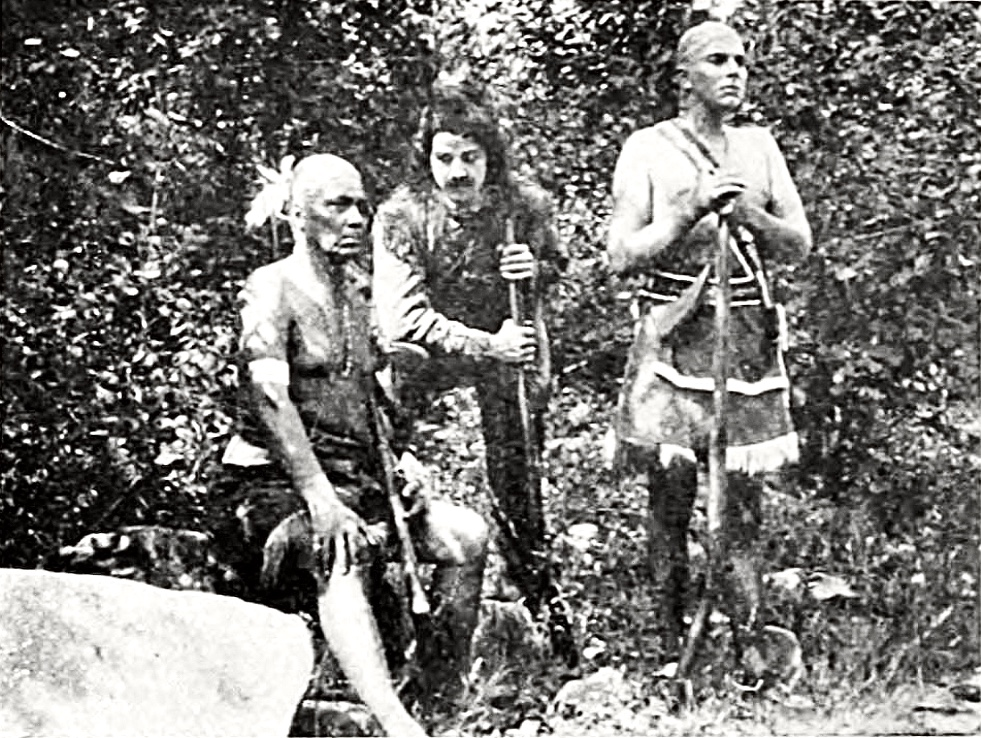
- Film still showing actors (from leff): Dark Cloud, Frank Hall Crane, and James Cruze
- Directed by: Theodore Marston
- Produced by: Thanhouser Company; New Rochelle, New York
- Starring: James Cruze; Frank Hall Crane; William Garwood
- Distributed by: Motion Picture Distributing and Sales Company
- Release date: November 11, 1911
- Running time: 1,000 feet, 35mm (15 minutes)
- Country: United States
- Languages: Silent; English intertitles

The Last of the Mohicans is a 1911 silent film adaptation of James Fenimore Cooper's 1826 novel The Last of the Mohicans. Produced by the Thanhouser Company and directed by Theodore Marston, it starred James Cruze in the title role of Uncas, along with Frank Hall Crane and William Garwood.

This production followed another screen adaptation of Cooper's novel, a film directed by D. W. Griffith and released by Biograph Studios in 1909 under the title Leather Stocking. In 1911, yet another adaptation of The Last of the Mohicans was produced in New York by Patrick Powers.

== Production ==
The production was filmed at Lake George, which is located in northeastern region of the state of New York.

== Distribution ==
Distributed by the Motion Picture Distributing and Sales Company, the film - a short film on a reel - was released in U.S. theaters on November 10, 1911.

== Reception ==
One listing describes the film as "surprisingly faithful to the original".
