= David Copperfield (1911 film) =

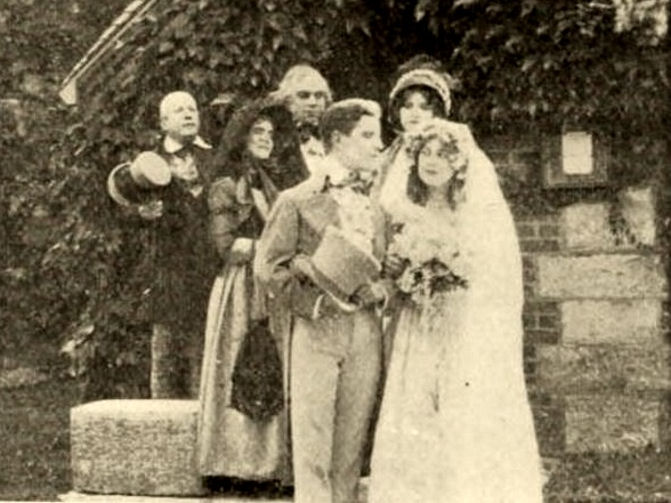
- A scene from David Copperfield (1911)
- Directed by: Theodore Marston
- Based on: David Copperfield; 1850 novel by Charles Dickens
- Distributed by: Thanhouser Film Corporation
- Release date: October 17, 1911
- Running time: 3 reels
- Country: United States
- Language: English

David Copperfield is a 1911 American silent short drama film based on the 1850 novel of the same name by Charles Dickens. It is the oldest known film adaptation of the novel.

== Overview ==
The film was made by the Thanhouser Film Corporation, an independent company located in New Rochelle, New York founded by Edwin Thanhouser. The film has been credited to Theodore Marston, but recent research points to George O. Nichols as director.

== Plot ==
David Copperfield consists of three reels and as three separate films, released in three consecutive weeks, with three different titles: The Early Life of David Copperfield, Little Em'ly and David Copperfield, and The Loves of David Copperfield.

== Cast ==
- Flora Foster as David Copperfield as a boy.
- Ed Genung as David Copperfield as a man.
- Marie Eline as Em'ly as a Child
- Florence La Badie as Em'ly as a Woman
- Mignon Anderson as Dora Spenlow
- Viola Alberti as Betsey Trotwood
- Justus D. Barnes as Ham Peggotty in part one
- William Russell as Ham Peggotty in part two
- William Garwood Ham Peggotty in part three

== Status ==
A print of the film still exists and is currently in the public domain.
