= Harry Benham =

American actor

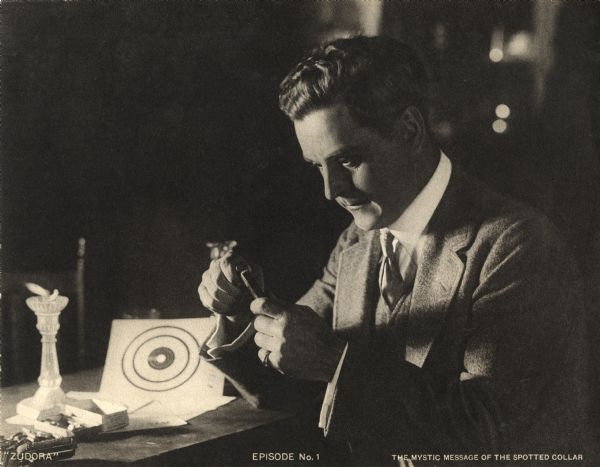
- Still of Benham loading a pistol in the 1914 Thanhouser serial Zudora.
- Born: February 26, 1884; Valparaiso, Indiana, US
- Died: July 17, 1969 (aged 85); Sarasota, Florida, US
- Occupations: Film actor, singer
- Spouse: Ethyle Cooke
- Children: 2

Harry Benham (February 26, 1884 – July 17, 1969) was an American silent film actor.

== Background ==
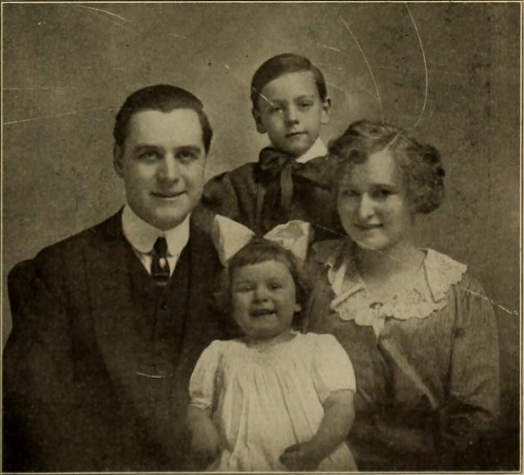
Benham with wife Ethyle Cooke and children Leland and Dorothy, c. 1912

Benham was born in Valparaiso, Indiana. As a child, he and his family moved to Chicago, where he was raised and attended school. Benham had a talent for singing and sang in his local church choir.

In 1904, the production Peggy From Paris came to Chicago and, at age 20, Benham became a member of the chorus while earning a living in the wholesale paper business.

Benham was soon selected to play the leading role in the production and remained in that role throughout the production's three-year run. He was subsequently able to garner more roles in other plays, such as The Sultan of Sulu, Woodland, Marrying Mary, The Gay Musician, H.M.S. Pinafore, Florodora, The Mayoress, and Madame Sherry.

In 1910 Benham joined the Thanhouser Company in New Rochelle, New York, for whom he played the leading role in many of the company's films through 1915. He married actress Ethyle Cooke, and together they had two children, Dorothy and Leland, who also became prominent Thanhouser personalities.

Benham died on July 17, 1969, in Sarasota, Florida, aged 85.

An article about his role in Dr. Jekyll and Mr. Hyde (1912) appeared in Famous Monsters of Filmland (October 1963).

== Filmography ==
=== 1910s ===
- The Old Curiosity Shop (1911)
- The Mummy (1911)
- The Regimental Ball (1911)
- Get Rich Quick (1911) .... Undetermined Role
- The Rescue of Mr. Henpeck (1911) .... Mr. Henpeck
- The Smuggler (1911) .... The Secret Service Man
- David Copperfield (1911)
- The Satyr and the Lady (1911) .... The Artist
- Their Burglar (1911) .... Jack
- The Missing Heir (1911) .... The Policeman
- The Lady from the Sea (1911)
- The Tomboy (1911) .... The Guardian
- Cinderella (1911) .... The Prince
- She (1911)
- The Expert's Report (1911) .... The Oil Expert
- Dr. Jekyll and Mr. Hyde (1912) (uncredited) .... Mr. Hyde (some scenes)
- Her Ladyship's Page (1912)
- East Lynne (1912)
- The Poacher (1912) .... The Poacher
- Nicholas Nickleby (1912) .... Nicholas Nickleby
- An Easy Mark (1912) .... The Crook
- The Baby Bride (1912) .... The Bachelor
- Dora Thorne (1912) .... Lord Rowland
- Jilted (1912) .... The Fiancé
- Her Secret (1912) .... The Loyal Sister's Husband
- Why Tom Signed the Pledge (1912) .... Tom, the Deacon's Son
- In Blossom Time (1912)
- The Professor's Son (1912) .... The Professor
- Out of the Dark (1912)
- Under Two Flags (1912/I)
- The Finger of Scorn (1912) .... The Drummer
- The Portrait of Lady Anne (1912) .... Lady Anne's Suitor in 1912
- The Merchant of Venice (1912) .... Bassanio
- Big Sister (1912)
- The Wrecked Taxi (1912)
- When a Count Counted (1912) .... The Young Law Clerk, Her Sweetheart
- The Voice of Conscience (1912) .... Suitor
- Letters of a Lifetime (1912) .... The Brother
- The Warning (1912) .... The Father
- Miss Robinson Crusoe (1912) .... The American
- Dotty, the Dancer (1912) .... Mademoiselle Cleo
- In a Garden (1912) .... The Quarrel Maker
- The Ladder of Life (1912) .... The Poor Man, as an Adult
- A Noise Like a Fortune (1912) .... The Young Farmer
- In Time of Peril (1912) .... The Engineer
- Miss Taku of Tokyo (1912) .... Jack, the Son
- The Forest Rose (1912)
- A Romance of the U.S.N. (1912) .... The Sailor
- At Liberty—Good Press Agent (1912) .... The Press Agent
- Aurora Floyd (1912) .... John Mellish, Aurora's Second Husband
- Brains vs. Brawn (1912) .... Brawn/The Young Athlete
- The Repeater (1912) .... Jack, the Repeater
- The Star of Bethlehem (1912) .... Angel Gabriel
- The Boomerang (1913/III) .... The Father
- Sherlock Holmes Solves the Sign of the Four (1913) .... Sherlock Holmes
- Just a Shabby Doll (1913) .... The Husband
- King René's Daughter (1913)
- Little Dorrit (1913)
- The Girl of the Cabaret (1913)
- The Medium's Nemesis (1913)
- Robin Hood (1913) .... Alan-a-Dale
- Moths (1913) .... Correze
- The Children's Hour (1913)
- He Couldn't Lose (1913)
- Baby's Joy Ride (1913)
- A Clothes-Line Quarrel (1913)
- What Might Have Been (1913)
- A Beauty Parlor Graduate (1913)
- An Orphan's Romance (1913)
- Pamela Congreve (1914)
- Frou Frou (1914) .... Henri de Sartorys
- Their Golden Wedding (1914)
- The Runaway Princess (1914)
- Coals of Fire (1914)
- Her Love Letters (1914)
- The Elevator Man (1914)
- The Success of Selfishness (1914)
- The Golden Cross (1914)
- The Scientist's Doll (1914)
- The Miser's Reversion (1914)
- When Sorrow Fades (1914)
- Repentance (1914)
- The Musician's Daughter (1914)
- The Infant Heart Snatcher (1914)
- A Woman's Loyalty (1914)
- Was She Right in Forgiving Him? (1914)
- Rivalry (1914)
- The Girl Across the Hall (1914)
- The Man Without Fear (1914)
- The Harlow Handicap (1914) .... Harry Allen
- Harry's Waterloo (1914)
- Stronger Than Death (1914)
- Gold (1914)
- The Mettle of a Man (1914)
- The Harvest of Regrets (1914)
- The Trail of the Love-Lorn (1914)
- The Rescue (1914/I)
- Zudora (1914) .... John Storm
- Mrs. Van Ruyter's Stratagem (1914)
- Graft vs. Love (1915)
- The Heart of the Princess Marsari (1915)
- Daughter of Kings (1915)
- The Girl of the Sea (1915)
- A Freight Car Honeymoon (1915)
- The Country Girl (1915) .... Belville, Phyllis' Lover
- Madame Blanche, Beauty Doctor (1915) .... Bob; Madame Blanche
- His Two Patients (1915) .... The Doctor
- When the Fleet Sailed (1915)
- When Hungry Hamlet Fled (1915)
- Helen's Babies (1915)
- The Scoop at Bellville (1915)
- The Man Inside (1916) .... Hunter
- The Path of Happiness (1916) .... Merrill Day, the Intruder
- The Doll Doctor (1916)
- Mignonette (1916)
- Held for Damages (1916)
- Through Flames to Love (1916)
- The Capital Prize (1916)
- Her Wonderful Secret (1916)
- A College Boomerang (1916)
- The Heart Wrecker (1916)
- Peggy and the Law (1916)
- The Clever Mrs. Carter (1916)
- The Little Grey Mouse (1916) .... Jack Stanley
- Love's Masquerade (1916)
- The Angel of the Attic (1916)
- The Girl Who Didn't Tell (1916)
- The Mischief Maker (1916) .... Al Tourney
- Pamela's Past (1916)
- Toto of the Byways (1916)
- Souls United (1917)
- When Thieves Fall Out (1917)
- The Dancer's Peril (1917) .... Richard Moraino
- The Warfare of the Flesh (1917) .... Frank Gregory
- When You and I Were Young (1917) .... Artist
- The Last of the Carnabys (1917) .... Johnn Rand
- Putting the Bee in Herbert (1917) .... Herbert Macklin
- The Outsider (1917) .... Donald Lyttleton
- The Victim (1917) .... Undetermined Role
- Convict 993 (1918) .... Rodney Travers
- Cecilia of the Pink Roses (1918) .... Harry Twombly
- The Love Craze (1918)

=== 1920s ===
- The Prey (1920) .... James Calvin
- For Love or Money (1920) .... John T. Hamilton
- The Dangerous Paradise (1920) .... Norman Kent
- Polly With a Past (1920) .... Clay Cullum
- Hush Money (1921) .... Bishop Deems
- The Road to Arcady (1922) .... John T. Hamilton
- Your Best Friend (1922) .... Robert Meyers
- The Town That Forgot God (1922) .... Harry Adams
