= Frederic Richard Sullivan =

American film director and actor (1872–1937)

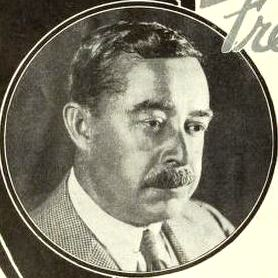
- Sullivan in 1921
- Born: 18 July 1872; London, England
- Died: 24 July 1937 (aged 65); Los Angeles, California, United States
- Occupations: Film director Actor

Frederic Richard "Dickie" Sullivan (sometimes credited as "Frederick"; 18 July 1872 – 24 July 1937), was an English-born American film director and actor of the silent era. He directed 34 films between 1913 and 1923. He also appeared in 29 films between 1913 and 1935. He also acted on stage. He was a nephew of the composer Arthur Sullivan.

== Early life ==
Sullivan was born in Pimlico in London, England, the son of Fred Sullivan and Charlotte Louisa Lacy (1841–1885). His uncle was composer Arthur Sullivan. He had seven brothers and sisters: Amy Sophie (1863–1947), Florence Louise (1865–1891), Edith Mary (1866–1877), Herbert "Bertie" Thomas (1868–1928), Maud "Cissie" Helen (1870–1940), George Arthur (1874–1919) and William Lacy (1877–1902). Sullivan's father died in 1877, leaving his pregnant mother with seven children under the age of 14. After his father's death, Sullivan's uncle Arthur visited the family often and became guardian to all of the children. In 1881, Charlotte married Captain Benjamin Hutchinson, a man 13 years her junior.

In December 1883, at the urging of Charlotte's brother, William Lacy, the family emigrated to Los Angeles, California, in the United States, except for Sullivan's eldest brother, Bertie, who stayed with their uncle Arthur in London. Charlotte died in January 1885, barely a year after the move to the U.S. Sullivan's stepfather, Hutchinson, unable to cope with this loss and his responsibilities, soon returned to England, leaving the six surviving children (Edith had died) to be brought up mostly by their uncle William, with the financial support of their uncle Arthur. In 1885, the family went on a sightseeing trip of the American West with their visiting uncle Arthur, who continued to support the family until his death in 1900 and in his will.

== Career, marriage and children ==
Sullivan directed at least 34 films, during the silent era, between 1913 and 1923. He also acted in at least 29 films between 1913 and 1935, including the Marx Brothers film Duck Soup, and he appeared on stage, including in several Broadway shows, from 1905 to 1931.

Sullivan married Kate Webb in 1902, and the couple had two daughters, Helen Mary (1906–1966) and Sheila (born 1919). Kate died in 1921, and Sullivan died in Los Angeles, California at the age of 65.

== Selected filmography ==
As director

- Cymbeline (1913)
- The Country Girl (1915)
- Divorce and the Daughter (1916)
- Her Life and His (1917)
- The Courtship of Miles Standish (1923)

As actor

- The Face on the Bar-Room Floor (1923) – Thomas Waring
- Beggar on Horseback (1925) – Dr. Rice
- The Mating Call (1928) – Uncredited
- The Black Watch (1929) – General's Aide
- Around the Corner (1930) – Sinclair Sr
- Monkey Business (1931) – Pickpocket Victim #1
- Duck Soup (1933) – Second Judge
- You're Telling Me! (1934) – Mr. Edward Quimby Murchison
- Thirty Day Princess (1934) – Doctor at Gresham's
