= The Tempest (1911 film) =

1911 American one-reel silent film directed by Edwin Thanhouser

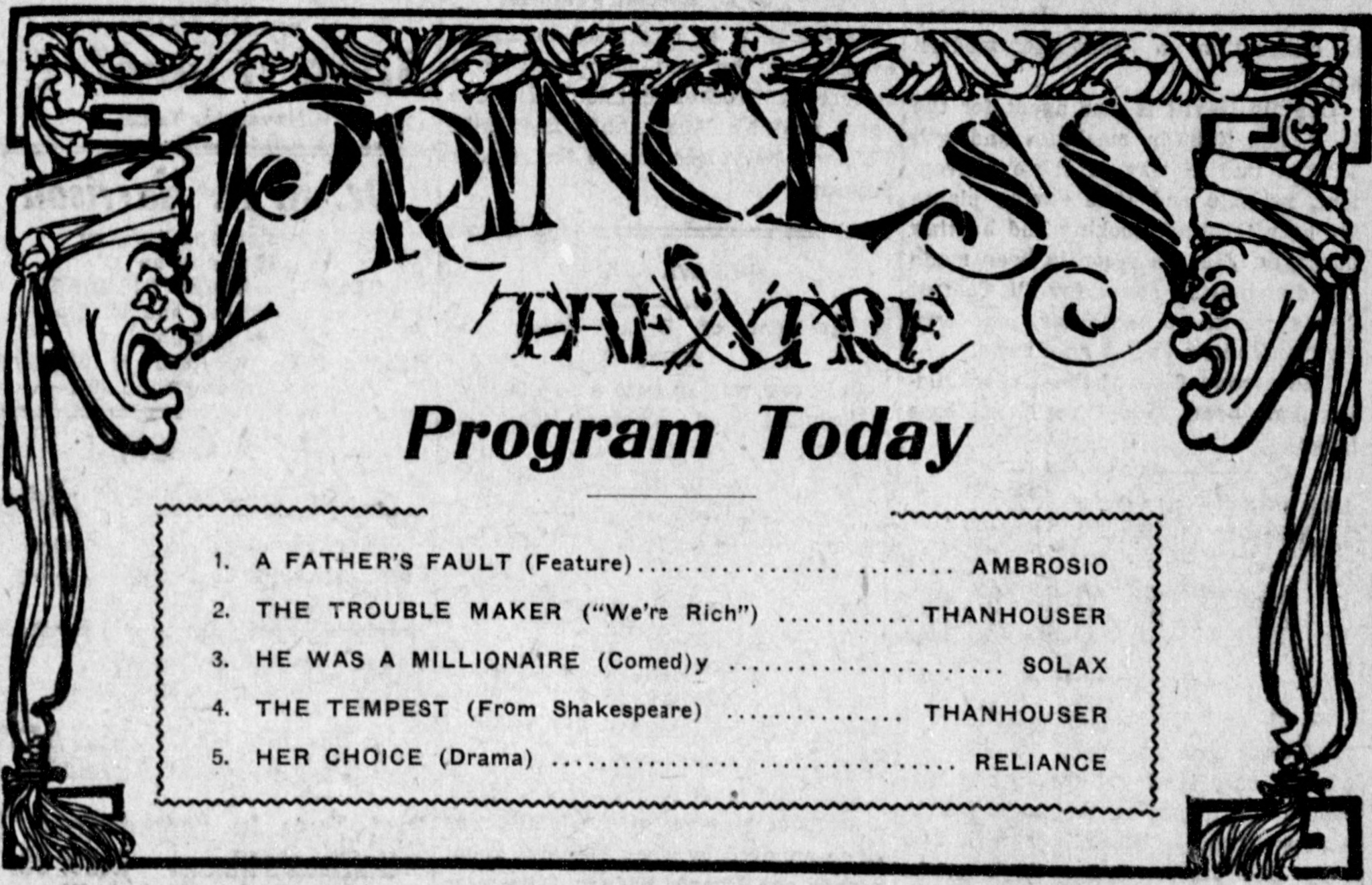
An advertisement for several films, including The Tempest.

The Tempest (1911) is an American one-reel silent film adaptation of the William Shakespeare play The Tempest. It was directed by Edwin Thanhouser, and starred Ed Genung as Ferdinand and Florence La Badie as Miranda, and released by Thanhouser Film Corporation. One of the earliest film adaptations of the play, it was released on November 28, 1911.
