= The Man Without a Country (1973 film) =

1973 film

- Genre: Drama
- Based on: The Man Without a Country; 1863 short story in The Atlantic Monthly by Edward Everett Hale
- Written by: Edward Everett Hale
- Screenplay by: Sidney Carroll
- Directed by: Delbert Mann
- Starring: Cliff Robertson; Beau Bridges; Peter Strauss
- Theme music composer: Jack Elliott; Allyn Ferguson
- Country of origin: United States
- Original language: English

Production
- Producer: Norman Rosemont
- Cinematography: Andrew Laszlo
- Editor: Gene Milford
- Running time: 78 min.
- Production company: Norman Rosemont Productions

Original release
- Network: ABC
- Release: April 24, 1973

The Man Without a Country is a 1973 American made-for-television drama film based on the 1863 short story "The Man Without a Country" by Edward Everett Hale.

== Synopsis ==
Midshipman Frederick Ingham reports for duty on his first shipboard assignment. He's introduced to Midshipman Arthur Danforth and they become fast friends. At dinner, they're interrupted by the arrival of a civilian joining them. Danforth kicks Ingham under the table to warn him not to continue his conversation about events in the US. Afterward, Ingham demands an explanation and is told that the civilian is Philip Nolan, whom Ingham thought was a myth. The executive officer (XO) arrives and recounts Nolan's story.

Nolan was a young artillery officer in Louisiana when Aaron Burr came to his fort and seduced him and other officers with promises of glory by seizing Texas from Mexico. After Burr was acquitted of treason in court, Nolan was tried for his role in the conspiracy by a military tribunal. At his trial, Nolan impulsively blurted out, “Damn the United States! I wish that I may never hear of the United States again!” The shocked tribunal sentenced him to never see the United States nor hear of it again. Nolan was exiled to sail on United States Navy warships, transferred between ships before they came within sight of the country, the crews forbidden to tell him news or even mention the name of the country. He was accorded respect and courtesy but still a prisoner. He made friends on each ship as he was amiable.

Nolan gradually became homesick. His first reminder of his loss was when crewmen friends on deck were reading a new book by Walter Scott, The Lay of the Last Minstrel. Encouraged to read it aloud, Nolan's mood turned dark when he came upon the final canto, "Breathes there the man, with soul so dead, Who never to himself hath said, / This is my own, my native land!"

Nolan was invited to attend a shipboard party in Italy. The wife of the US consul recognized Nolan as an old acquaintance and asked him to dance. She coaxed and cajoled him with small talk until he lowered his guard and asked about home. She loudly and publicly scolded him that he had no home and he left dejectedly, his shipmates disgusted by her treachery.

During the War of 1812, the ship Nolan was on was in a sea battle. All of the officers were dead. Nolan took command of the remaining crew and lured the British vessel close then dismasted it with a broadside. For his valor, the captain presented him with his sword and promised to plead for his pardon. The bureaucracy refused it.

The XO finishes telling Nolan's tale and they sight a slave ship. The crew boards the ship and cuts the shackles of the slaves packed below decks. The slaves speak a variety of languages. The only translator available is Nolan, who has learned languages from books and can speak to one of the slaves in Portuguese. They beg to be returned to their homelands. The captain is resistant but finally acquiesces after Nolan tells their tales of months of terrible woe.

Ingham begins to learn of Nolan's various interests, including astronomy, mythology, botany and languages, all from books given by his shipboard friends. Ingham gains a love of learning from Nolan. After a year, Ingham is reassigned to a different ship. Ten years later, he is reunited with Danforth and Nolan on another ship. Nolan is even more a scholar than before and his love for the United States has continued to grow. They part again for another 15 years. At a reunion dinner with various officers who had befriended Nolan over the years, Ingham takes pity on Nolan and, disobeying orders, tells him Texas has joined the union, the first nugget of information Nolan has been given in decades.

Ingham decides to plead Nolan's case in Washington, D.C., but he finds a bureaucracy unwilling to help. The Secretary of the Navy dismisses Ingham's efforts because records of Nolan's sentence were destroyed in the sack of Washington in 1812, and the Secretary fears charges of liability for decades of imprisonment without legal documentation.

Years later, Ingham receives a letter from Danforth, who is in command on Nolan's last voyage. He relates Nolan's final moments. Invited to Nolan's quarters, he finds it is a shrine to the United States, festooned with flags and other souvenirs. After Nolan begs for information on his deathbed, Danforth decides to mercifully tell him the 56 years of American history that he has missed. Danforth omits mention of the Civil War, which he felt would be heartbreaking to a man who imagined a single unified nation.

Nolan is buried at sea. His final request is that a stone marker be set near Fort Adams, Mississippi to warn others not to repeat his grave mistake, with the epitaph, “He loved his country as no other man has loved her, but no man deserved less at her hands.” Years later, a frail Ingham and Danforth struggle up the small hill to pay respects at the marker.

== Cast ==
- Cliff Robertson as Philip Nolan
- Beau Bridges as Frederick Ingham
- Peter Strauss as Arthur Danforth
- Robert Ryan as Lieutenant Commander Vaughn
- Peter Weller as Lieutenant Fellows
- Walter Abel as Colonel A.B. Morgan
- Geoffrey Holder as Slave On Ship

== Production ==
Producer Norman Rosemont spent three years trying to raise financing. He spent $16,000 of his own money to prepare a visual presentation of the film and arranged for a script for be written by Sidney Carroll. During the course of research he discovered that the book was not based on a true story although it was inspired by the Aaron Burr conspiracy.

He eventually succeeded in getting sponsorship from Eastman Kodak.

"Casting was so essential," said Rosemont. "We had to find an actor who could age 60 years on screen. The makeup was the easiest. Making him look young was the hardest."

Rosemont approached Cliff Robertson, although the actor had not done television for years. "But when he saw our research it turned him on." he said. "It's a dream part for an actor." Cliff Robertson signed to make the film in August 1972 and filming began in September. "We had to change our schedule to fit Cliff's," said Rosemont. "It cost me a lot of money but it was worth it."

Filming took place in Mystic, Connecticut, Newport, Rhode Island and Fort Niagara, New York.

Director Delbert Mann says Robertson was "very difficult to work with" on the film. He gave an instance where Robertson kept emphasising the word "United" when referring to the "United States" ("he thought the young people would reject the patriotism aspects"). "We went for about 20 takes, he never changed it, but he modified it on the last take, which we used in the picture. He still wouldn't change it in post-production dubbing. It was a matter of taking the best take we had and going with it."

Filming was expensive. "I do my own work," said Rosemont. "If there's a deficit I pay for it. My money is on the line. I put it on screen. Hopefully it will enjoy many repeats; it's an ageless story, a potential TV perennial."

=== Locations ===
In the summer of 1972, the replica of HMS Rose (later renamed HMS Surprise for another film) was hired for the film, a made-for-television production. Norman Rosemont Productions was unable to find the money to take the ship out sailing, so all the filming was shot with sails set, as the ship was securely moored to the pier, next to the causeway to Goat Island. During filming Cliff Robertson had to hide that he had a broken leg at the time.

== Reception ==
Mann said, "The end result was fascinating. The older audience took to the picture and the critics were marvelous. People saying, look at the unfeeling government, crushing this man. The young people got what they wanted and others saw it as love of country. We had it both ways."

== Awards ==
The film was nominated for Best Cinematography for Entertainment Programming – For a Special or Feature Length Program Made for Television at the 26th Primetime Emmy Awards.

== Home video ==
The movie was released by Worldvision Home Entertainment on VHS in 1992. It has never been released on DVD, streaming or other digital formats.
