= The Man Without a Country (album) =

The Man Without a Country (Bing Crosby album)

Studio album by Bing Crosby
- Released: Original 78 album: 1947; Original LP album: 1950
- Recorded: June 13, 1947
- Genre: Drama
- Length: 17:22
- Label: Decca

Bing Crosby chronology
The Small One (1947)	The Man Without a Country (Bing Crosby album) (1947)	Drifting and Dreaming (1947)

The Man Without a Country is the seventh solo studio album by American singer and actor Bing Crosby, released on September 15, 1947 as a Phonograph record of the famous 1863 Edward Everett Hale short story. The story had been adapted as a poetic narrative by Jean Holloway. The album was produced and directed by Paramount Pictures producer Robert Welch with musical accompaniment from Victor Young and His Orchestra.

== Track listing ==
These songs were featured on a two-disc twelve-inch, 78 rpm album set, Decca Album No. DAU-3. The album was auto-coupled for ease of playing with a record changer. Parts one and two were recorded on June 13, 1947, and parts three and four on June 16, 1947.

Disc 1: (90013)

1. “Part One” – 4:10
2. “Part Four” – 4:17

Disc 2: (90014)

3. "Part Two” – 4:17
4. “Part Three" – 4:38

== Cast ==
- Bing Crosby: Narrator
- Frank Lovejoy: Philip Nolan
- Joan Banks: Ann
- Griff Barnett: Judge
- Gale Gordon: Captain
- Norman Fields: Attorney
- Jack Webb, Ira Grossel, Frank Gerstle: voices

== Radio broadcast ==
Bing Crosby specially presented this patriotic piece on his Philco show of November 26, 1947 on the eve of Thanksgiving and although basically the same as the commercial issue, a different cast lead to an alternative interpretation. There were also differences in scripting, particularly in Crosby’s narration which had been somewhat amplified. This led to an interesting review by Variety:

"Bing Crosby was impressive on his Philco Show, Wednesday night (26th) on ABC, as the narrator of Jean Holloway’s dramatisation of Edward Everett Hale’s, ‘The Man Without a Country’. There was one other notable aspect of the broadcast. That was the impression on the listener, particularly during the present emphasis on patriotism, of the familiar story of Philip Nolan’s disgrace. There has always been something disturbing about that notorious incident but this broadcast suggested, as never before, (not even on several previous presentations of the same script) that the punishment imposed on Nolan was inhumanely cruel. It was deliberate and unrelenting and only death brought relief for the officer who, on thoughtless impulse, wished never to hear of the United States again. No one could seriously have thought Nolan really have meant what he had blurted out in a moment of rage. In fact, as Hale’s account says, Nolan’s epitaph contained the statement that no man ever loved America more than he. Only the most supremely self-righteous patriot would willingly face the same strict accountability of his everyday reckless word that Philip Nolan faced and this broadcast suggested that in the case of ‘The Man Without A Country, the intended villain emerged a finer figure than did the zealots who judged him."

== Other releases ==
The album was transferred to a dual 10" LP along with the What We So Proudly Hail 78 rpm set in 1950 with the catalogue number Decca 'DL 8020'.

The recording was rebroadcast as part of a 1954 Memorial Day edition of the WNBC poetry radio program Anthology.

"The Man Without a Country" first appeared on CD on Jonzo's The Chronological Bing Crosby Vol. 45 (JZCD-45).
