= The Man Without a Country (1917 film) =

1917 film by Ernest C. Warde

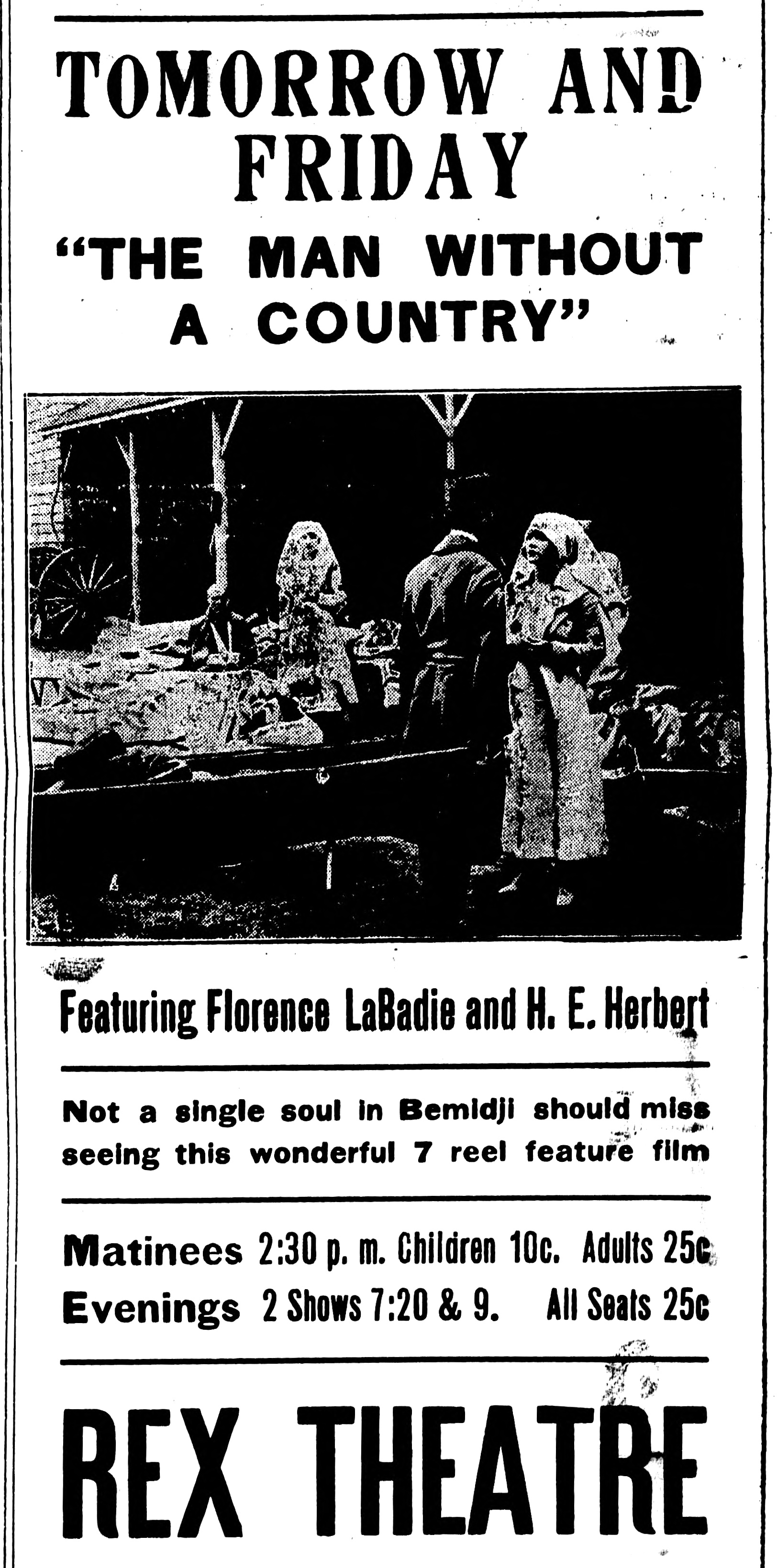
- Advertisement
- Directed by: Ernest C. Warde
- Written by: Lloyd Lonergan (scenario)
- Based on: The Man Without a Country; 1863 story in The Atlantic Monthly by Edward Everett Hale
- Produced by: Edwin Thanhouser (Supervisor)
- Starring: Florence La Badie; Holmes Herbert; J. H. Gilmour
- Cinematography: George Webber
- Production company: Thanhouser Film Corporation
- Distributed by: Jewel Productions
- Release date: September 9, 1917
- Running time: 6 reels
- Country: United States
- Language: Silent (English intertitles)

The Man Without a Country

The Man Without a Country is a 1917 American silent film adaptation of Edward Everett Hale's 1863 short story of the same name. The film was directed by Ernest C. Warde, and starred Florence La Badie, Holmes Herbert, and J. H. Gilmour, and released by Thanhouser Film Corporation.

The film follows closely to the storyline of Hales's text and its production and success in film theaters may be related to the historical context of the period. The original story, with its strong patriotic theme, was written during the American Civil War in order to increase public support for the Union cause. The film had a like function with regard to the First World War, which the United States had joined a few months prior to the film's release.

The film was released on September 9, 1917, and was the last film role of Florence La Badie, who would die in October 1917 from injuries sustained in an automobile crash in August 1917, just days before the film's premiere.

== Plot ==
As described in a film magazine, Barbara Norton (La Badie) and her brother Tom (Marlo), orphaned children of a veteran who gave his life for his country, go to live with their uncle Phineas (Howard) and aunt (Hastings) in the city. It is just before the entrance of the United States into the European war and the uncle is a pacifist. He holds meetings at home where Barbara assists him. Barbara's brother is a loyal American and is greatly troubled by the uncle's expectations to count on him. Barbara meets John Alton (Herbert), who wins her promise to be his wife. They are very happy until war is declared and Barbara cannot bear the thought of her future husband not doing service for his country. His "Peace at Any Price" button is the last straw and she gives him a choice of either joining the "colors" or breaking the engagement. John declares that he is a true pacifist and Barbara, believing that a man who cannot support his country is that country's enemy, breaks the engagement publicly. Her fiancé becomes very unpopular at his club because of his views and is taken to task by one of his father's friends. Having lost Barbara and his popularity makes him resent the constant references to the United States and his debt to his country, and he curses his native land. Barbara enlists as a Red Cross nurse and her brother as a soldier. Later, an old friend of John's family, Pop Milton (Dundan), gives him a copy of "The Man Without a Country" and asks him to read it and rise above his treasonous views. He does so, and as he reads the immortal story the patriotic spirit of Barbara comes to him in a vision of Columbia who tells him that in a previous life he was the Philip Nolan of the story. She takes him back to historic times and shows him a succession of scenes from the book. The man of today sees with horror the famous court martial in which he was sentenced to never hear of the United States again, the tragedy of the careful carrying out of the sentence, and the pitiful death of the man, made easier by the humanity of Captain Danforth (Gilmour), who gives him a brief history of the land he learns to bless before he dies. John's spirit returns from the allegorical journey and he responds to the new and vigorous manhood within and enlists at once, thereby winning Barbara, who was at home on sick leave from her nursing work in France.

== Cast ==
- Florence La Badie as Barbara Norton
- Holmes Herbert as John Alton / Lt. Philip Nolan (credited as H.E. Herbert)
- J. H. Gilmour as Capt. Danforth
- Carey L. Hastings as Mrs. Blair (credited as Carey Hastings)
- Ernest Howard as Phineas Blair
- Charles Dundan as Pop Milton
- Wilbert Shields as Undetermined Role
- George Marlo as Tom
