= Florence La Badie =

American actress

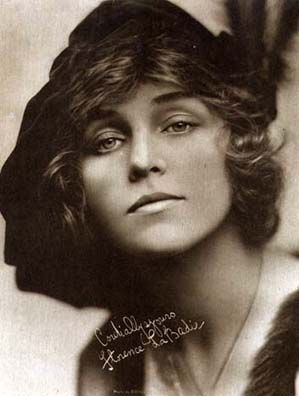
- Born: Florence Russ; April 27, 1888; New York City, U.S.
- Died: October 13, 1917 (aged 29); Ossining, New York, U.S.
- Occupation: Actress
- Years active: 1909–1917

Florence La Badie /ˈlɑːbɑːˌdiː/ (born Florence Russ; April 27, 1888 – October 13, 1917) was an American-Canadian actress in the early days of the silent film era. She was a major star between 1911 and 1917. Her career was at its height when she died at age 29 from injuries sustained in an automobile accident.

== Early life ==
Florence La Badie was born Florence Russ on April 27, 1888, the second child of Horace Blancard and Marie Lynch (Chester) Russ in New York City. After the death of her father in 1890 and her mother's inability to provide sufficient care, Florence, at age three, was adopted by Joseph E. and Amanda J. La Badie of Montreal, Canada. She was given their surname.

Florence's adoptive father, Joseph E. La Badie, was a prominent attorney in Montreal. His wife, former Amanda Victor, is said to have been born in Europe, possibly Paris. Florence's adoptive uncle, Oddiehon LaBadie, maintained an estate in nearby St. Lambert. Florence was educated in New York City schools and at the Convent of Notre Dame in Montreal.

== Actress ==
Florence La Badie moved to New York after school and became one of the most important and popular actresses of the early motion picture era. Starting in 1909, she appeared in 30 films for Biograph, and 166 silent films from 1911 through 1917 for the Thanhouser studio in New Rochelle, New York.

She was nicknamed "Fearless Flo" for taking risks and performing many of her own stunts in contemporary coverage. She was a frequent subject for articles and letters in fan and trade magazines, which described her as one of the most publicized Thanhouser players over several years.

== Career success ==
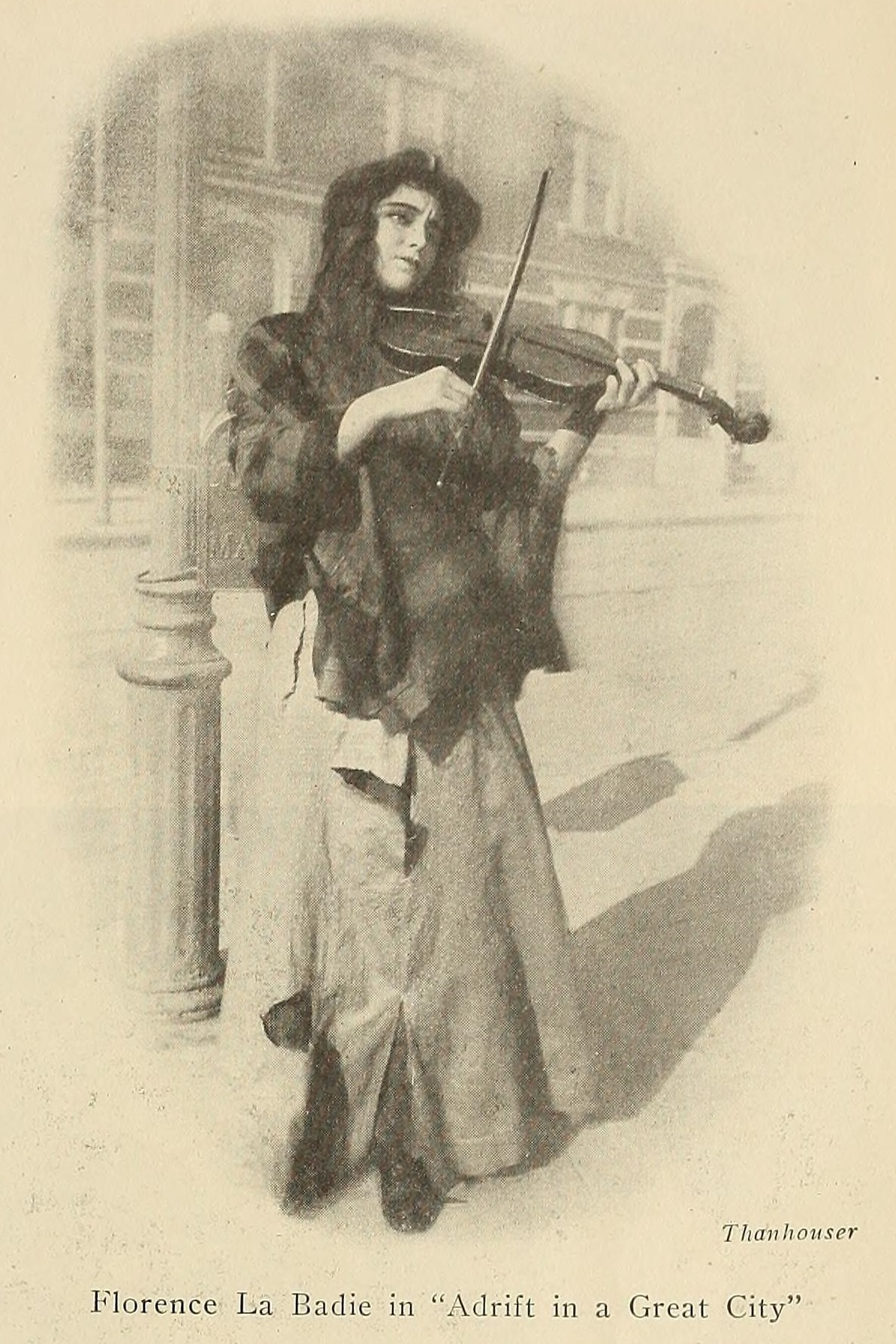
Florence La Badie as Katheleen Moran, the blind girl, in Adrift in a Great City (1914)

Having completed her studies, she was offered work as a fashion model in New York City. Once there, in early 1908 she obtained a small part in a stage play. Following this, she signed to tour with a road company for the next two years and appeared on stage in various places in the eastern part of the United States. During this period she met a fellow Canadian, the young actress Mary Pickford, who suggested she "try pictures". In 1909 Pickford invited La Badie to watch the making of a motion picture at the Biograph studio in Manhattan. Given an impromptu bit part, La Badie was invited back to Biograph's studios to participate in another film later that year. She would go on to make several films under the renowned D. W. Griffith, with her first credited film being in the 1909 film The Politician's Love Story, starring Mack Sennett and Kathlyn Williams.

In 1911, La Badie's career took a leap forward when she was hired by Edwin Thanhouser of the Thanhouser Film Corporation in New Rochelle, New York. With her sophistication and beauty, Florence La Badie soon became Thanhouser's most prominent actress, appearing in dozens of films over the next two years. Her most remembered films of that period were The Tempest (1911); Dr. Jekyll and Mr. Hyde (1912), a film adaptation of the Robert Louis Stevenson story; and the first film of Shakespeare's Cymbeline (1914). Her most well-known work was in the 1914-1915 serial, The Million Dollar Mystery. In 1915, she was featured in the magazine Reel Life, which described her as "the beautiful and talented Florence La Badie, of the Thanhouser Studios, considered one of the foremost of American screen players". Over a course of six years, La Badie's career had taken her to top-billing as a film actress.

== World War I ==
When World War I broke out in Europe in 1914, Canada immediately joined the war as an ally of the United Kingdom. Several of La Badie's young male friends and relatives from Montreal were quickly shipped overseas. She had many movie fans in Canada and, according to one New York newspaper, in 1915 a young soldier fighting in the trenches at the Front in Northern France wrote to her, sending dozens of photographs that graphically depicted the horrors of the war.

Deeply affected, La Badie became a vigorous advocate for peace, traveling the United States with a stereopticon slide show of the soldier's photographs, warning about the terrible dangers of going to war.

== Personal life ==
For a time, La Badie was engaged to a Cadillac salesman named Val Hush but they broke up. She later became involved with Daniel Carson Goodman, a writer who worked on the scenario for Thanhouser's serial Zudora.

== Death ==
In August 1917, La Badie was at the height of her motion picture success. She had appeared in 185 films since 1909, 32 fewer than Mary Pickford's 217 films during the same period. Her film The Woman in White had just been released in July 1917.

Her most recent two films, an adaptation of Edward Everett Hale's short story The Man Without a Country, and War and the Woman, were both scheduled to be released on September 9, 1917.

Although the Thanhouser Corporation had been struggling since the 1914 death of Charles J. Hite in an automobile accident, La Badie's career was thriving and had been their saving grace. Less than a month earlier, she had announced that she was leaving Thanhouser. She said that several other film corporations were willing to pick her up on contract immediately.

On August 28, 1917, while driving near Ossining, New York, in the company of her fiancé, Daniel Carson Goodman, her brakes failed and the vehicle plunged down a hill, overturning at the bottom. She was thrown from the vehicle and suffered serious injuries, including a compound fracture of the pelvis, while Goodman escaped with only a broken leg. Hospitalized, she clung to life for more than six weeks and seemed to be improving, but suddenly died on October 13 from sepsis.

La Badie was the first major female film star to die while her career was at its peak, and the movie-going public mourned her death. After a large funeral, she was interred in an unmarked grave in the Green-Wood Cemetery in Brooklyn, New York. In a deposition in a legal proceeding days before La Badie's death, Marie C. Russ swore in a deposition to have been her biological mother. Obituary notices stated La Badie was survived by her mother, Amanda La Badie, with no mention of her having been adopted. Upon her death, her estate was divided between her parents, Mr. and Mrs. Joseph La Badie.

In 2014, Ned Thanhouser, the grandson of Edwin Thanhouser, raised money for a headstone for La Badie, which was installed on April 27 of that year, on what would have been her 126th birthday.

== Selected filmography ==
- David Copperfield (1911)
- The Indian Brothers (1911)
- Bobby, The Coward (1911)
- The Thief and the Girl (1911)
- Fighting Blood (1911)
- Her Sacrifice (1911)
- The Primal Call (1911)
- Enoch Arden (1911)
- Dave's Love Affair (1911)
- The Manicure Lady (1911)
- The New Dress (1911)
- How She Triumphed (1911)
- A Knight of the Road (1911)
- Madame Rex (1911)
- Paradise Lost (1911)
- The Broken Cross (1911)
- The Spanish Gypsy (1911)
- The Diamond Star (1911)
- The Two Paths (1910)
- After the Ball (1910)
- The Troublesome Baby (1910)
- A Gold Necklace (1910)
- Serious Sixteen (1910)
- Taming a Husband (1909)
- Through the Breakers (1909)
- In the Window Recess (1909)
- Getting Even (1909
- Comata, the Sioux (1909)
- The Seventh Day (1909)
- A Strange Meeting (1909)
- The Salvation Army Lass (1909),
- The Politician's Love Story (1909).
- Florence's Thanhouser Filmography

1911

- The Smuggler (7–25–1911)
- Swords and Hearts (8–28–1911)
- The Buddhist Priestess (9–12–1911)
- In the Chorus (9–15–1911)
- The Satyr and the Lady (10–20–1911)
- Little Em'ly and David Copperfield (10–24–1911)
- The Last of the Mohicans (11–10–1911)
- A Mother's Faith (11–17–1911)
- The Baseball Bug (11–24–1911)
- Beneath the Veil (12–1–1911)
- Cinderella (12–22–1911)

1912

- Dr. Jekyll and Mr. Hyde (1–16–1912)
- Her Ladyship's Page (1–23–1912)
- East Lynne (1–26–1912)
- As It Was in the Beginning (1–30–1912)
- The Trouble Maker (2–6–1912)
- The Silent Witness (2–13–1912)
- The Guilty Baby (2–27–1912)
- The Arab's Bride (3–1–1912)
- Extravagance (3–5–1912)
- Flying to Fortune (3–12–1912)
- My Baby's Voice (3–29–1912)
- The Girl of the Grove (4–5–1912)
- A Love of Long Ago (4–9–1912)
- Rejuvenation (4–23–1912)
- The Saleslady (5–7–1912)
- Jilted (5–14–1912)
- Jess, Part 1 - A Sister's Sacrifice (5–21–1912)
- The Ring of a Spanish Grandee (5–24–1912)
- Jess, Part 2 - Through the Boer Lines (5–28–1912)
- Jess, Part 3 - Jess, the Avenger (5–28–1912)
- Whom God Hath Joined (5–31–1912)
- Dottie's New Doll (6–4–1912)
- Called Back (6–21–1912)
- In Blossom Time (6–25–1912)
- Ma and Dad (7–5–1912)
- Under Two Flags (7–7–1912)
- The Portrait of Lady Anne (7–23–1912)
- The Merchant of Venice (7–26–1912)
- Big Sister (8–11–1912)
- The Wrecked Taxi (8–16–1912)
- Lucile, Parts 1 and 2 (8–27–1912)
- Lucile, Part 3 (8–30–1912)
- The Voice of Conscience (9–3–1912)
- A Star Reborn (9–10–1912)
- Undine (9–24–1912)
- Miss Robinson Crusoe (10–8–1912)
- When Mercy Tempers Justice (10–15–1912)
- Mary's Goat (10–27–1912)
- Petticoat Camp (11–3–1912)
- Through the Flames (11–8–1912)
- A Noise Like a Fortune (11–10–1912)
- The County's Prize Baby (11–12–1912)
- Aurora Floyd (12–10–1912)
- The Race (12–20–1912)
- The Star of Bethlehem (12–24–1912)

1913

- A Poor Relation (1–3–1913)
- The Evidence of the Film (1–10–1913)
- Some Fools There Were (2–14–1913)
- The Pretty Girl in Lower Five (2–18–1913)
- The Two Sisters (2–21–1913)
- The Way to a Man's Heart (3–2–1913)
- An Honest Young Man (3–9–1913)
- Won at the Rodeo (3–21–1913)
- Her Gallant Knights (3–23–1913)
- Cymbeline (3–28–1913)
- Retribution (4–18–1913)
- Rosie's Revenge (4–27–1913)
- Her Sister's Secret (5–6–1913)
- The Other Girl (5–9–1913)
- Marble Heart (5–13–1913)
- In Their Hour of Need (5–23–1913)
- The Snare of Fate (6–17–1913)
- Tannhäuser (7–15–1913)
- In the Nick of Time (8–1–1913)
- Oh! Such a Beautiful Ocean (8–10–1913)
- The Lie That Failed (8–15–1913)
- An Unromantic Maiden (8–24–1913)
- The Ward of the King (8–26–1913)
- The Message to Headquarters (9–12–1913)
- When the Worm Turned (9–21–1913)
- Life's Pathway (9–30–1913)
- Louie, the Life Saver (10–7–1913)
- A Deep Sea Liar (10–12–1913)
- A Peaceful Victory (10–17–1913)
- Beauty in the Seashell (10–19–1913)
- The Mystery of the Haunted Hotel (10–21–1913)
- A Twentieth Century Farmer (10–31–1913)
- The Water Cure (11–2–1913)
- The Junior Partner (11–4–1913)
- Little Brother (11–7–1913)
- The Blight of Wealth (11–25–1913)
- Curfew Shall Not Ring Tonight (11–28–1913)
- A Beauty Parlor Graduate (12–9–1913)
- The Head Waiter (12–28–1913)

1914

- Their Golden Wedding (1–2–1914)
- Adrift in a Great City (1–13–1914)
- Turkey Trot Town (1–18–1914)
- The Elevator Man (1–25–1914)
- Twins and a Stepmother (2–3–1914)
- The Success of Selfishness (2–6–1914)
- A Leak in the Foreign Office (2–17–1914)
- Cardinal Richelieu's Ward (3–1–1914)
- The Cat's Paw (3–17–1914)
- A Debut in the Secret Service (4–7–1914)
- A Mohammedan Conspiracy (5–12–1914)
- The Somnambulist (5–17–1914)
- Out of the Shadows (6–2–1914)
- Under False Colors (12–22–1914)
- The Fall of Khartoum (12–31–1914)
- 1914-1915 Serial: The Million Dollar Mystery (23 episodes)

1915

- Graft vs. Love (1–19–1915)
- The Finger Prints of Fate (1–26–1915)
- The Smuggled Diamond (2–9–1915)
- The Adventure of Florence (2–23–1915)
- The Final Reckoning (3–9–1915)
- The Duel in the Dark (3–23–1915)
- The Cycle of Hatred (4–6–1915)
- Bianca Forgets (4–27–1915)
- Monsieur Nikola Dupree(5–4–1915)
- God's Witness (5–20–1915)
- A Freight Car Honeymoon (6–6–1915)
- The Six-Cent Loaf (6–8–1915)
- The Country Girl (6–15–1915)
- Crossed Wires (6–29–1915)
- When the Fleet Sailed (8–3–1915)
- M. Lecoq (8–26–1915)
- Reincarnation (8–31–1915)
- A Disciple of Nietzsche (9–25–1915)
- The Price of Her Silence (9–30–1915)
- Mr. Meeson's Will (11–6–1915)
- All Aboard (11–28–1915)
- Her Confession (12–12–1915)

1916

- The Five Faults of Flo (1–20–1916)
- What Doris Did (3–1–1916)
- Master Shakespeare, Strolling Player (4–20–1916)
- The Fugitive (8–13–1916)
- The Fear of Poverty (9–10–1916)
- Saint, Devil and Woman (9–25–1916),
- The Pillory (10–8–1916)
- Divorce and the Daughter (12–3–1916)

1917

- Her Life and His (2–18–1917)
- When Love Was Blind (4–15–1917)
- The Woman in White (7–1–1917),
- War and the Woman (9–9–1917)
- The Man Without a Country (Jewel 9–9–1917)
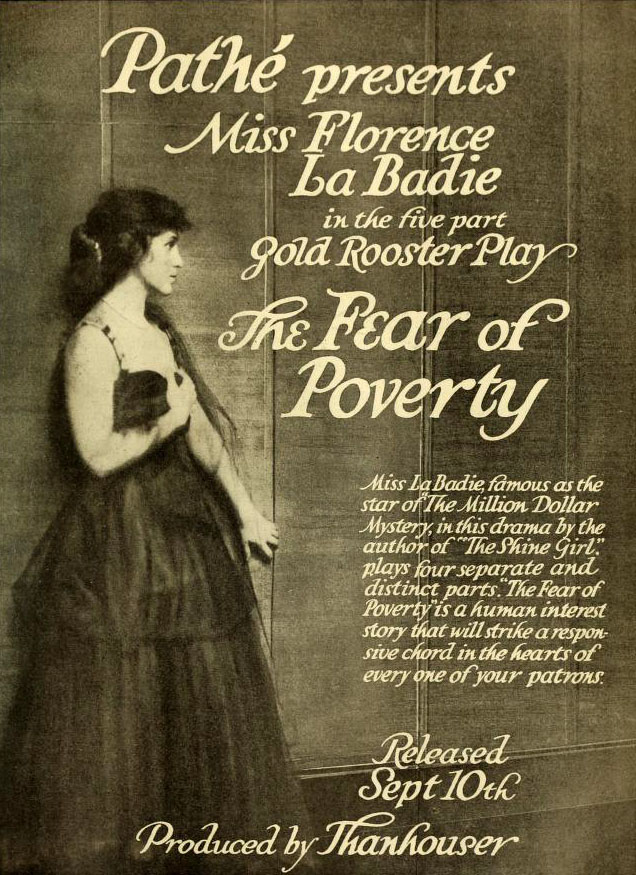
The Fear of Poverty (1916)

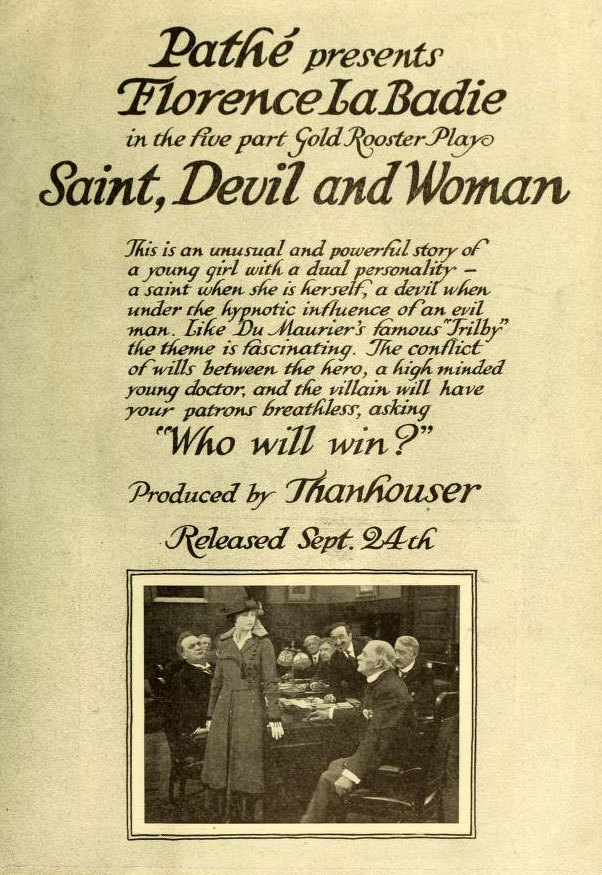
Saint, Devil and Woman (1916)

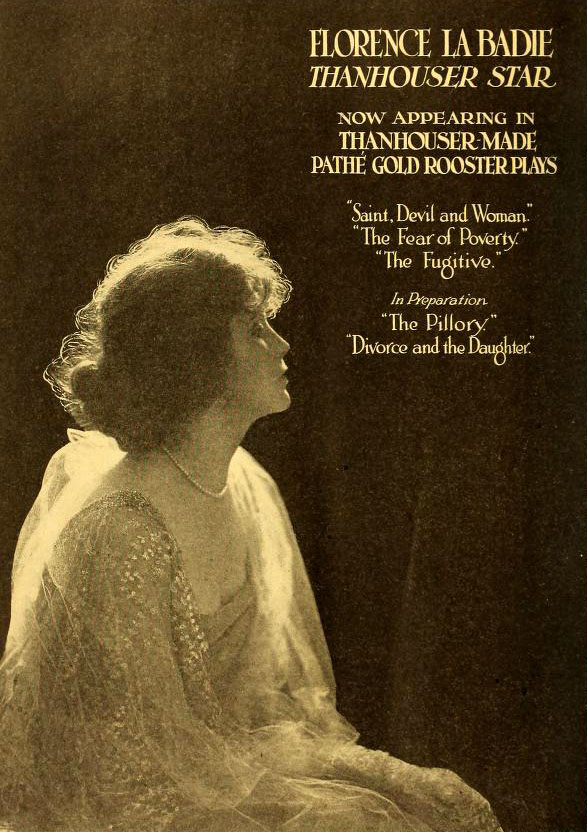
Advertisement (1916)

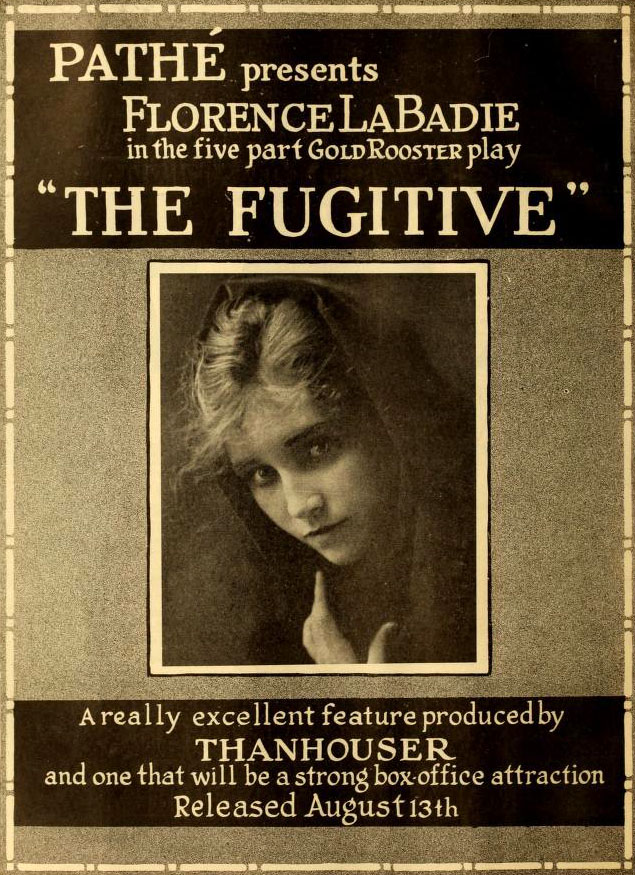
The Fugitive (1916)
