= Mother (1910 film) =

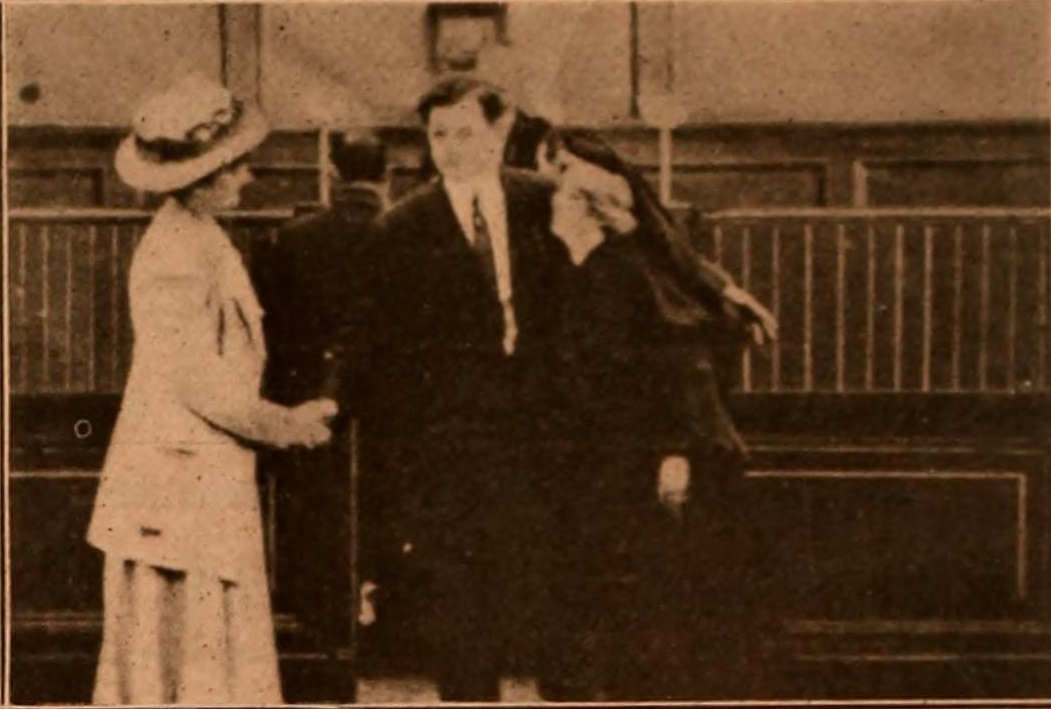
- A surviving film still
- Produced by: Thanhouser Company
- Distributed by: Motion Picture Distributing and Sales Company
- Release date: September 6, 1910
- Country: United States
- Languages: Silent film English intertitles

Mother is a 1910 American silent short drama produced by the Thanhouser Company. The film is a melodrama that focuses with Will Allen who runs away from home after being violently abused by his stepfather and his mother keeps a candle lit for him to return home. Twenty years later, Will returns home after having become a successful lawyer, but cannot find his parents. Will later takes the case to defend a lady being prosecuted by a client company. After being successful he recognizes the lady as his mother and they are reunited. The film's cast included Anna Rosemond, Frank H. Crane and Carey L. Hastings, but other credits are uncertain. The film was released on September 6, 1910, and was met with mixed reviews. The film is presumed lost.

== Plot ==
Though the film is presumed lost, a synopsis survives in The Moving Picture World from September 10, 1910. It states: "The play deals with Will Allen, a country lad, who is unhappy at home, because he is a studious little chap and prefers his books to farm work, which incurs the displeasure and enmity of his stepfather, a rough and surly farmer, to whom book learning does not appeal. Will runs away from home, and although his mother keeps a light in the window, hoping to guide her boy home, he never returns. Twenty years later, when the boy has made a place for himself in the world as a successful lawyer, he goes back to the farm, only to find that his little mother, who has been left a widow, has gone away, whither, no one knows. The mother, in the meantime, being left alone in the world, goes to the city and there supports herself by dressmaking. While shopping in a department store she is unjustly accused of shoplifting. The only person who believes in her innocence is a salesgirl, who is discharged for her presumption and daring to correct her superiors. The girl, in her efforts to help the friendless old lady, enlists the aid of Will, whom she knows to be a lawyer of great ability. Will is about to refuse the case, as the dry goods company is a client of his, when the girl describes the lonely old lady, and begs him for the sake of his mother to befriend her. Will consents. Will's clear statement of the case to the judge, together with May's testimony, frees the mother. When her counsel approaches to offer his congratulations, mutual recognition results."

== Cast ==
- Anna Rosemond
- Frank H. Crane
- Carey L. Hastings

== Production ==
The writer of the scenario is unknown, but it was most likely Lloyd Lonergan. He was an experienced newspaperman employed by The New York Evening World while writing scripts for the Thanhouser productions. The plot of the production was criticized by a film reviewer The New York Dramatic Mirror because the boy grows up unaware that his stepfather had died or that her mother had moved to the city in search of work. The reviewer states, "One would think that he would have kept in communication with his mother if he loved her so much, but it appears he did not..." The film director is unknown, but it may have been Barry O'Neil. Film historian Q. David Bowers does not attribute a cameraman for this production, but at least two possible candidates exist. Blair Smith was the first cameraman of the Thanhouser company, but he was soon joined by Carl Louis Gregory who had years of experience as a still and motion picture photographer. The role of the cameraman was uncredited in 1910 productions. The cast includes both Anna Rosemond and Frank H. Crane, two early leading actors of the Thanhouser Company. Carey L. Hastings, real name Carey Tidball, was a sister of Gertrude Thanhouser and was an actress that was featured in numerous Thanhouser productions. Hastings first and earliest known work was Thanhouser's St. Elmo adaptation. Hastings would not have another known credit until 1912. The Silent Era website states that Harry Benham and Maude Fealy had roles in the production. However, both of these credits are well-before those attributed by Bowers. Harry Benham is known to have joined the Thanhouser Company in 1910, but the first credit cited by Bowers is The Old Curiosity Shop in January 1911. Bowers also cites Maude Fealy having made only intermittent appearances with the first being The Early Life of David Copperfield in October 1911. Other credits amongst the cast are unknown, but most of the credits are fragmentary for 1910 Thanhouser productions.

== Release and reception ==
The single reel drama, approximately 975 feet long, was released on September 6, 1910. The film was distributed by the Motion Picture Distributing and Sales Company. Once the film was released, it was sometimes listed ambiguously for other productions bearing the same name. One ambiguous listing, most likely for the Thanhouser film, was made by the Crystal Theatre in Hutchinson, Kansas. Known theaters advertising the film, unambiguously, are noted in Indiana and Arizona. A reviewer of The Moving Picture World wrote, "[The film is a] little domestic tragedy which shows how boys are sometimes driven from home and what results from it. ... It is a picture that goes direct to the heart and makes one put himself in the place of all the characters. Perhaps that magic word, mother, is the key to the whole situation." The New York Dramatic Mirror took issue with the depiction of the step father's violent abuse of the young son and found the melodrama to be one "with an ending that appeals to the sympathies".

== See also ==
- List of American films of 1910
