= The Latchkey =

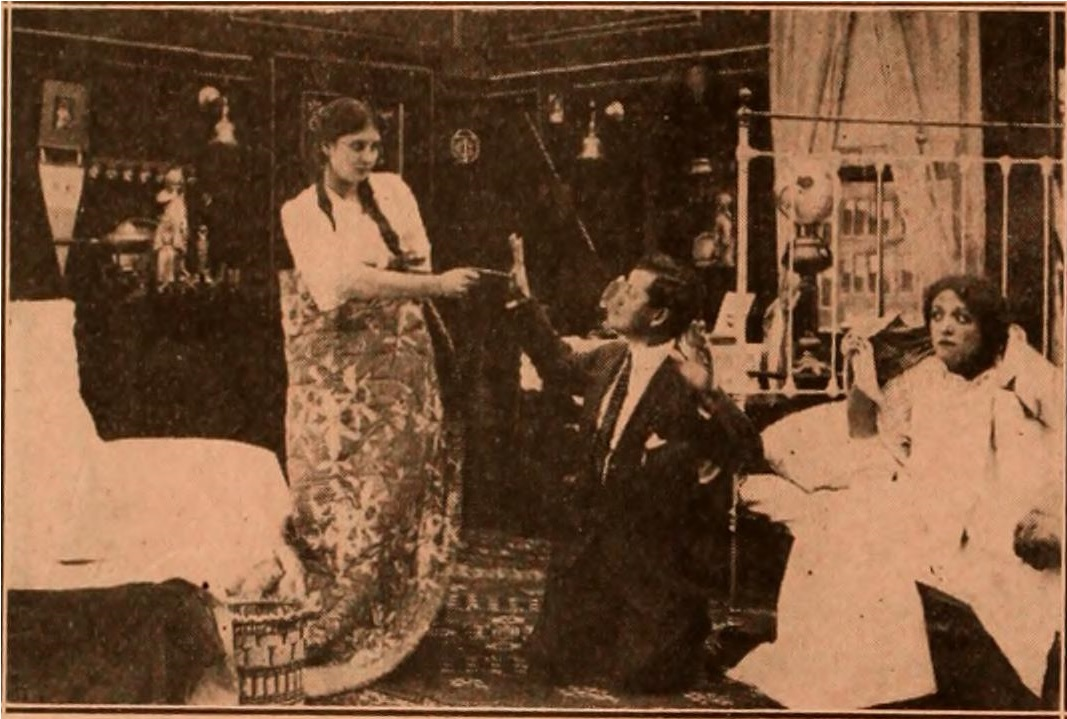
- A surviving film still
- Produced by: Thanhouser Company
- Release date: August 26, 1910
- Country: United States
- Languages: Silent film English intertitles

The Latchkey is a 1910 American silent short comedy produced by the Thanhouser Company. The premise of the plot focuses on two businessmen who are friends Will (or Bill in some publications) and John. Will gives John the key to his apartment so he had stay there while Will goes on vacation. The landlady of the house leases the apartment to two ladies. John decides to go to Will's apartment and lets himself in with the key and finds the two girls asleep. They awake and take him for a burglar and threaten to kill him and John pleads for mercy instead of addressing the misunderstanding. John is later revealed to be her employer after he is caught opening a safe in the office the next morning. The film was released on August 26, 1910 and was met with positive reviews by the trade publications. The film is presumed lost.

== Plot ==
Though the film is presumed lost, a synopsis survives in The Bioscope from November 10, 1910. It states: "Will and John are prosperous young businessmen and close friends. Will has an apartment in the city, while John lives in the suburbs. When Will goes to the country on his vacation he leaves the latchkey of his apartment with his chum, telling him to make himself at home. The landlady in the house in which Will lives is seized with a bright idea that she can sublet his apartment during his absence. May and Belle, two pretty girls who are in business, decide to try their hand at housekeeping. They rent Will's apartment and settle down in their new quarters. John decides to take advantage of his friend's invitation and make use of his rooms. He lets himself in with the latchkey, and is amazed to find the two girls sound asleep. Believing him to be a burglar the girls threaten him with annihilation. John thinks the joke too good to spoil, so does not try to square himself, but pleads for mercy. May secures his promise that he will never 'burgle' again, and allows him to escape. Unknown to John, May has been engaged by his partner as a typist, and when she enters the office the following morning and finds John opening the safe, she decides that once again her burglar has been caught red-handed. She calls for help, and is greatly chagrined when her supposed burglar is introduced as her employer. Amid explanations, the 'burglar' and the lady shake hands and become good friends."

In both The Moving Picture World and The Moving Picture News the character of Will was named Bill, but it is not clear if this was intentional, a renaming or error.

== Production ==
The writer of the scenario is unknown, but it was most likely Lloyd Lonergan. He was an experienced newspaperman employed by The New York Evening World while writing scripts for the Thanhouser productions. The film director is unknown, but it may have been Barry O'Neil. Film historian Q. David Bowers does not attribute a cameraman for this production, but at least two possible candidates exist. Blair Smith was the first cameraman of the Thanhouser company, but he was soon joined by Carl Louis Gregory who had years of experience as a still and motion picture photographer. The role of the cameraman was uncredited in 1910 productions. There are no known credits for the cast, but Anna Rosemond and Frank H. Crane are two possible actors that were prominent players in 1910. Credits may have included Anna Rosemond, one of two leading ladies of the Thanhouser company in this era. Frank H. Crane was a leading male actor of the company and also involved since the very beginnings of the Thanhouser Company. Bowers states that most of the credits are fragmentary for 1910 Thanhouser productions. A surviving film still leaves open the possibility of identifying three actors.

== Release and reception ==
The one reel comedy, approximately 1,000 feet long, was released on August 26, 1910. The film likely saw a wide national release, advertisements in theaters are known in Indiana, North Carolina, and Pennsylvania. The New York Dramatic Mirror gave the most detailed review of the trade publications by summing up the scenario and approving of the plot and the good acting in the production. The reviewer concluded, "Not only are the leading roles well portrayed, but the minor parts are quite well done in the picture - the dismissed stenographer and the old landlady actually look and act their parts. There is a pleasing, symmetrical competence in the whole cast." The production was reviewed positively by The Moving Picture World and concludes with the statement, "The story ends there without a suspicion of anybody falling in love with anybody else, a restraint which will be duly appreciated." Bower's notes that many Thanhouser plots conclude with the romance and the reviewer noted this change was a welcome one for this production. The previous film A Dainty Politician concluded with romance and the next release An Assisted Elopement took the romance element further with two sets of parents trying to get their children to marry each other.

== See also ==
- List of American films of 1910
