= The Star of Bethlehem (1912 film) =

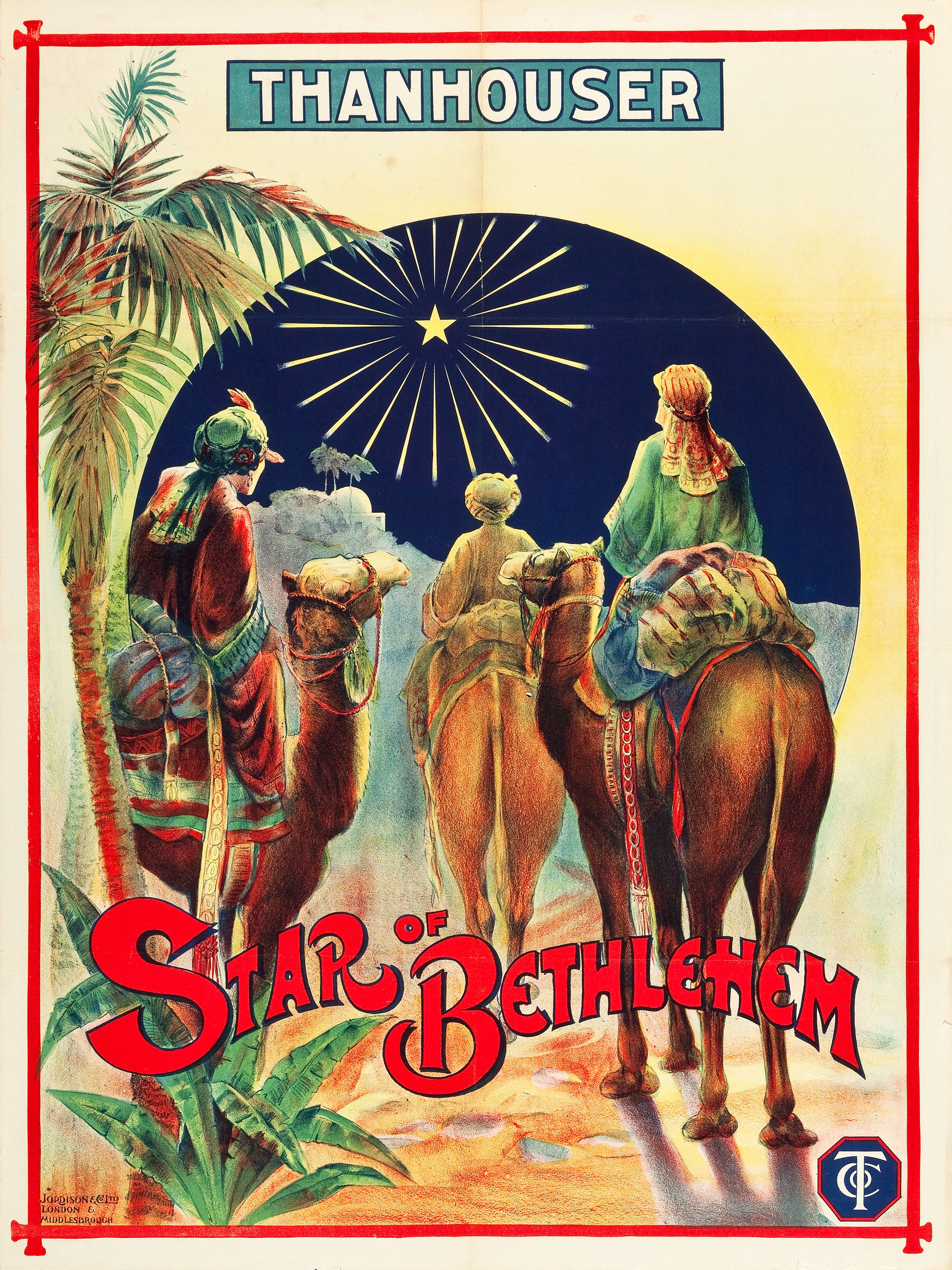
- British movie poster
- Directed by: Lawrence Marston
- Written by: Lloyd Lonergan
- Produced by: Edwin Thanhouser; Charles J. Hite
- Starring: Florence La Badie; William Russell; James Cruze
- Production company: Thanhouser Company
- Distributed by: Film Supply Company; Mutual Film
- Release date: December 24, 1912
- Running time: 106 minutes
- Country: United States
- Languages: Silent; English intertitles

The Star of Bethlehem is a 1912 American silent film produced by Edwin Thanhouser and Charles J. Hite, and featuring Florence La Badie, James Cruze, and William Russell. The film is a retelling of Biblical events preceding the Nativity of Jesus. Directed by Lawrence Marston, the entire film is staged as brief tableaux. With much of the original lost (only 15 minutes survive), the existing footage can be difficult to interpret as a coherent whole.

== Overview ==
The Star of Bethlehem (1912)

The plot follows those narratives of the Bible which lead up to the birth of Jesus Christ. The cast was headed by Florence La Badie as Mary, James Cruze as Joseph, with William Russell as King Herod.

== Cast ==
- Florence La Badie as Mary
- James Cruze as Micah/Joseph
- William Russell as King Herod
- Justus D. Barnes as Gaspar, a Magi
- Riley Chamberlin as Balthasar, a Magi
- Charles Horan as Melchior, a Magi
- Harry Marks as Scribe
- Lawrence Merton as Scribe
- N.S. Woods as Scribe
- David H. Thompson as Pharisee, rabbi
- Lew Woods as Pharisee, scribe
- Joseph Graybill as Roman messenger
- Carl LeViness – shepherd
- Frank Grimmer – shepherd
- Ethyle Cooke

== Production notes ==
This film was produced by the Thanhouser Company in 1912. In later life, La Badie described her role of Mary as the favorite of her career.

== Status and availability ==
The film was originally shot on three full reels. Today, only a one-reel edited version survives and is preserved at the BFI National Archive and the John E. Allen, Incorporated archive. The surviving footage is now in the public domain. Because no copyright number exists in the film, it is possible that it was never officially copyrighted at the time of its release.

The Star of Bethlehem was included on The Thanhouser Collection: Volumes 1, 2 and 3 DVD collection released in 2006.

== See also ==
- List of Christmas films
