= John Halifax, Gentleman (1910 film) =

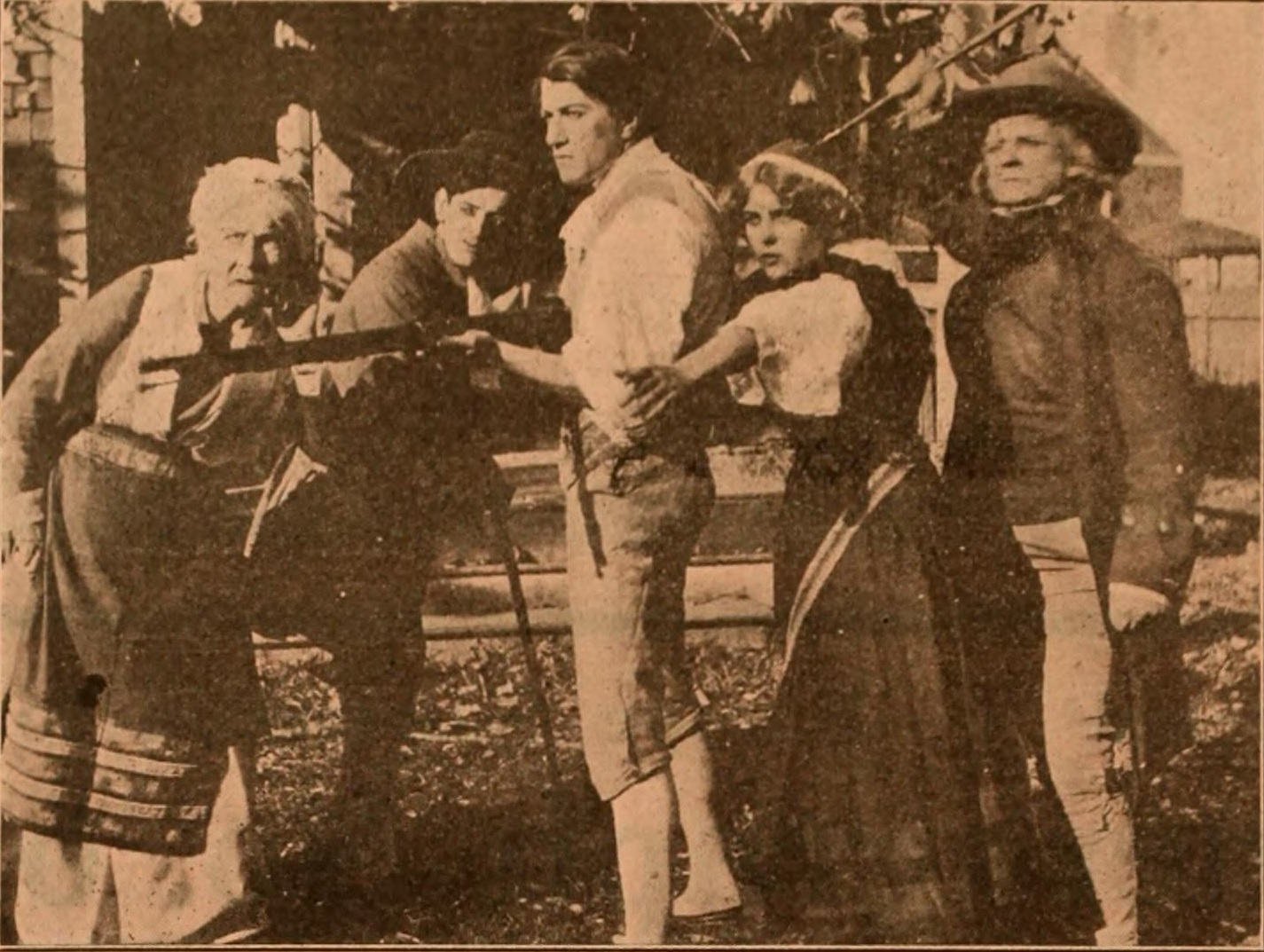
- Martin Faust and Violet Heming in John Halifax, Gentleman
- Produced by: Thanhouser Company
- Distributed by: Motion Picture Distributing and Sales Company
- Release date: December 2, 1910
- Country: United States
- Languages: Silent film English intertitles

John Halifax, Gentleman is a 1910 American silent short drama produced by the Thanhouser Company. The film is the first film adaptation of Dinah Maria Mulock Craik's popular novel John Halifax, Gentleman and stars Martin Faust as John Halifax. The film focuses on John Halifax, an orphan who is taken in by a rich Quaker, Abel Fletcher. After a period of five years, John has becomes a foreman and he and Fletcher's invalid son, Phineas, have become good friends. Despite Fletcher's objections, John takes Phineas to the theatre. The trip is too much for Phineas and John carries him home, Fletcher becomes irate and drives John out of the house. Fletcher is soon confronts a mob of workers after closing the mill and throws the bags of grain into the river. John saves the life of Fletcher and his son and marries Ursula, the daughter of the richest man in town. The production credits are unknown, but the film was not directed by Theodore Marston. The film was released on December 2, 1910 and was met with mixed reviews. The film is presumed lost.

== Plot ==
Though the film is presumed lost, a synopsis survives in The Moving Picture World from December 3, 1910. It states: "John Halifax, an orphan, trudges to town to make his fortune. There he is befriended first by Ursula March, the daughter of the richest man in town, who gives him food, and later by Abel Fletcher, a rich Quaker. Fletcher's invalid son takes a great fancy to John, and through his influence John is employed in his father's mill. After five years of faithful work, John has risen to the position of foreman. He and Fletcher's son, Phineas, had become fast friends. Against the wishes of his father, Phineas persuades John to take him to a theatre. The trip proves too much for the invalid, and John carries him home from the theatre in a fainting condition. Fletcher is furious with John, and drives him from the house. About this time there is a great discontent at the mill, among the workmen. Fletcher decides to close it down. After six weeks of starvation, the workmen and their families come in a crowd to the mill and demand that they be given the grain which is stored there. Rather than accede to their demands, Fletcher hurls the bags of grain into the river. This so infuriates the mob that they try to set fire to the mill and put an end to Fletcher. Unable to control the mob, John helps Fletcher, his son and Ursula, to escape. Finally he wins Fletcher's consent to compromise with the men. Realizing that he owes his property and life to John, Fletcher asks his forgiveness for his former harsh treatment. John becomes Fletcher's adopted son and wins Ursula for his bride."

== Cast ==
- Martin Faust as John Halifax
- Frank H. Crane
- William Russell
- Violet Heming

== Production ==
The production and an adaptation of Dinah Maria Mulock Craik's popular novel John Halifax, Gentleman. Originally published in 1856, it would be reprinted numerous times and established itself as a "classic" over the passing decades. At the time of the film's production Craik's works were very familiar to audiences. The writer of the scenario is unknown, but it was most likely Lloyd Lonergan. He was an experienced newspaperman employed by The New York Evening World while writing scripts for the Thanhouser productions. The film director is unknown, but it may have been Barry O'Neil or Lucius J. Henderson. Sometimes the directional credit is given to Theodore Marston. The apparent origin of this error is from the American Film-Index 1908–1915. Film historian Q. David Bowers consulted one of the co-authors of the book, Gunnar Lundquist, and confirmed that the credit of Marston was in error. Theodore Marston worked with Pathé, Kinemacolor of America, Vitagraph and other companies, but there is no record of Marston working with Thanhouser. This error has persisted in several works including The Complete Index to Literary Sources in Film. Cameramen employed by the company during this era included Blair Smith, Carl Louis Gregory, and Alfred H. Moses, Jr. though none are specifically credited. The role of the cameraman was uncredited in 1910 productions.

The only known cast credits are for Martin Faust, Frank H. Crane, William Russell and Violet Heming. The other cast credits are unknown, but many 1910 Thanhouser productions are fragmentary. In late 1910, the Thanhouser company released a list of the important personalities in their films. The list included G.W. Abbe, Justus D. Barnes, Frank H. Crane, Irene Crane, Marie Eline, Violet Heming, Martin J. Faust, Thomas Fortune, George Middleton, Grace Moore, John W. Noble, Anna Rosemond, Mrs. George Walters. Bowers lists this as the first known credit of William Russell, formerly of the Biograph Company. Russell would become one of the most important actors of the company until his final departure in 1913. It is not the earliest known appearance by Russell, as he is shown in a film still of A Thanksgiving Surprise.

== Release and reception ==
The single reel drama, approximately 1,000 feet long, was released on December 2, 1910. The film likely had a wide national release, advertising theaters are known in Pennsylvania, Michigan, Kansas, and Indiana. The film is cited by The Complete Index to Literary Sources in Film as the earliest adaptation of John Halifax, Gentleman.

The film was received conflicting reviews by both The Moving Picture World and The New York Dramatic Mirror. The reviewer for the World said, "This well known story is rendered into a motion picture in a way that will please the most exacting. ... The picture proves that a good rendering of even an old story is attractive. The audience apparently delights in the character of John Halifax. He is quite as good on the curtain as he is in the book, and there he has always been a favorite. The different parts are played to perfection. The character of the daughter and the ill son are both faithfully reproduced and seem to live before the audience." The Mirror reviewer The film is not as well acted as Thanhouser pictures usually are. The strict character of the old Quaker is insufficiently expressed and is apt to leave the audience to guess why John is ordered out, and the strike scene is far from impressive. The mob to a man wave their sticks incessantly, instead of portraying intense rage as should have been done." Bowers noted that the Mirror was not a neutral party in respect to the works of the Independent producers.

== See also ==
- List of American films of 1910
