= Looking Forward (1910 film) =

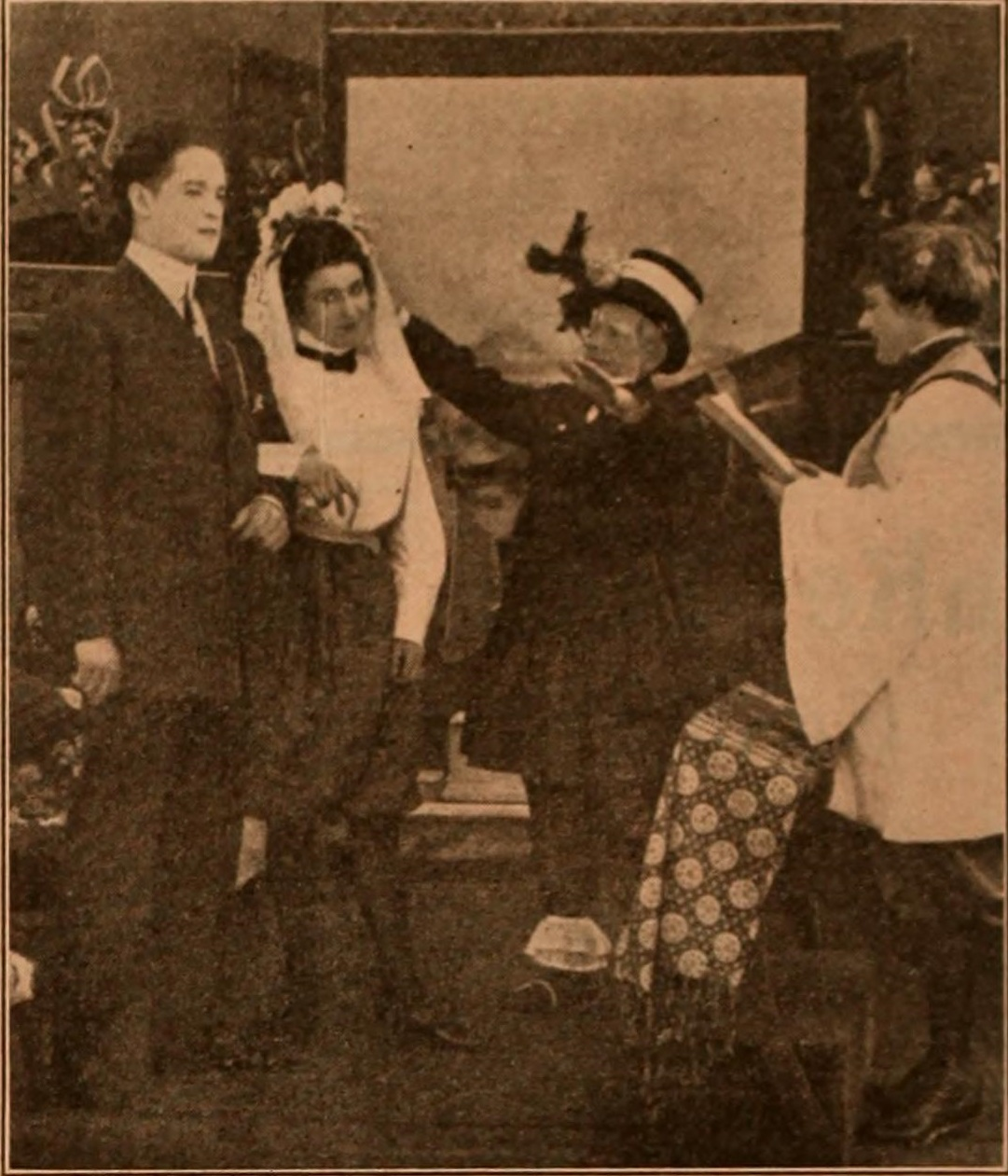
- A film still showing the marriage of Jack and the female mayor
- Directed by: Theodore Marston
- Written by: James Oliver Curwood (story); Theodore Marston
- Produced by: Thanhouser Company
- Starring: Frank Hall Crane; William Russell
- Distributed by: Motion Picture Distributing and Sales Company
- Release date: December 20, 1910
- Country: United States
- Languages: Silent film English intertitles

Looking Forward is a 1910 American silent short drama film produced by the Thanhouser Company. Adapted from James Oliver Curwood's short story of the same name, the film follows a young chemist named Jack Goodwin. He discovers a chemical compound that puts a person into a state of sleep for a determined period of time and decides to test it upon himself. The first test is a success and Jack makes arrangements for his sleep of a hundred years, in a state similar to suspended animation. When he awakes in 2010 into a world ruled by women, he woos the female mayor. Jack joins a society to campaign for men's rights. The society ends up before the female mayor who jails all of them, save for Jack who she proposes to. Jack accepts on the condition that men are given back their rights and she accepts. The cast and production credits of the film are not known, but Theodore Marston was not the director. The film was released on December 20, 1910. The film is presumed lost.

== Plot ==
The film focuses on Jack Goodwin, a young chemistry student who has discovered a novel compound that allows a person to be put in a state of sleep for any length of time. The compound causes an effect similar to suspended animation, with no ill-effects or bodily changes. Jack tests the compound on himself for a period of a week and desires to test it for a century. In preparation for this, he obtains a safety deposit vault and provides instructions to be presented before the mayor in a hundred years. Jack's experiment works and he awakes in the year 2010 to a very different future. Transportation has been radically changed to pneumatic tubes allowing him to be transported to the mayor. The woman mayor takes an interest in him and invites her over to her home. In the intervening years, the world has become ruled by women and Jack is now out of place, but the two fall in love. Her father is an advocate for men's rights and Jack joins their society. The group soon appears before the mayor and she sends all of them to jail through the pneumatic tube, except for Jack. She proposes to him, but Jack only consents if the rights of men would be granted. The mayor is true to her word and signs a decree to give the men their liberty. During the ceremony, she attempts to lead Jack to the altar, but Jack shows her that the man must lead. When the bridal veil is placed on Jack, he places it on his new wife.

== Cast ==
- Frank H. Crane
- William Russell

== Production ==
The scenario is adapted from James Oliver Curwood's short story of the same name. The writer of the scenario is unknown, but it was most likely Lloyd Lonergan. He was an experienced newspaperman employed by The New York Evening World while writing scripts for the Thanhouser productions. The film director is unknown, but it may have been Barry O'Neil or Lucius J. Henderson. Sometimes the directional credit is given to Theodore Marston. The apparent origin of this error is from the American Film-Index 1908–1915. Film historian Q. David Bowers consulted one of the co-authors of the book, Gunnar Lundquist, and confirmed that the credit of Marston was in error. Theodore Marston worked with Pathé, Kinemacolor of America, Vitagraph and other companies, but there is no record of Marston working with Thanhouser. This error has persisted in several works including The Complete Index to Literary Sources in Film. Cameramen employed by the company during this era included Blair Smith, Carl Louis Gregory, and Alfred H. Moses Jr. though none are specifically credited. The role of the cameraman was uncredited in 1910 productions.

The cast credits are unknown, but many 1910 Thanhouser productions are fragmentary. In late 1910, the Thanhouser company released a list of the important personalities in their films. The list includes G.W. Abbe, Justus D. Barnes, Frank H. Crane, Irene Crane, Marie Eline, Violet Heming, Martin J. Faust, Thomas Fortune, George Middleton, Grace Moore, John W. Noble, Anna Rosemond, Mrs. George Walters.

Musical accompaniment for the silent films were not provided by the studios, and the Thanhouser productions were no exception. The musical program for the screenings were decided and played by the individual accompanists. At times, musical accompaniments were shared in trade journals, but for Looking Forward a dispute serves to provide one musical credit provided by Mrs. Buttery of Pennsylvania. In responding to an editorial in The Moving Picture World, Mrs. Buttery stated that "John Took Me Home to See His Mother" was played during film at some unstated point.

== Release and reception ==
The single reel comedy, approximately 1,000 feet long, was released on December 20, 1910. The New York Dramatic Mirror stated, "Here is a rather exaggerated farce with a good many laughs in it. It has for its basis recent cartoons, but has original treatment. The male members of the cast seemed to enjoy their roles, perhaps for the reason that it is a man's picture; the laugh seems on the ladies." A more contemporary analysis of the film was covered in a paper by Eric Dewberry, who credits this film as Thanhouser's first film portraying suffragists. (Note: A Dainty Politician also had suffragists as a plot element, but it was not the focus of the work.) Dewberry writes that the film presents the idea of a woman mayor, something which was not farfetched for women to find to be humorous. Despite Jack's lack of power in the new era which he awakes to, he managed to win the heart of a powerful woman and easily restore the rights of men. Taken one way, the film seems to advance the idea that women of power are controlled by their hearts. Dewing writes, "On the one hand it mocks many female suffrage "fighting tactics," as suffragists, in an attempt to not appear too extremist and alienable, exploited conservative ideas of feminine virtue in order to assert their citizenship and reform desires. In the film, the man assumes effeminate passions to woo the Mayor. On the other hand, those sympathetic to the cause can see this as proof that these tactics can work in politics. The film also toys with the fears men harbored concerning the loss of power over females in public spaces, a threat to masculinity and manhood." The film is also believed to have been the first adaptation of Curwood's work.

== See also ==
- List of American films of 1910
