= The Winter's Tale (1910 film) =

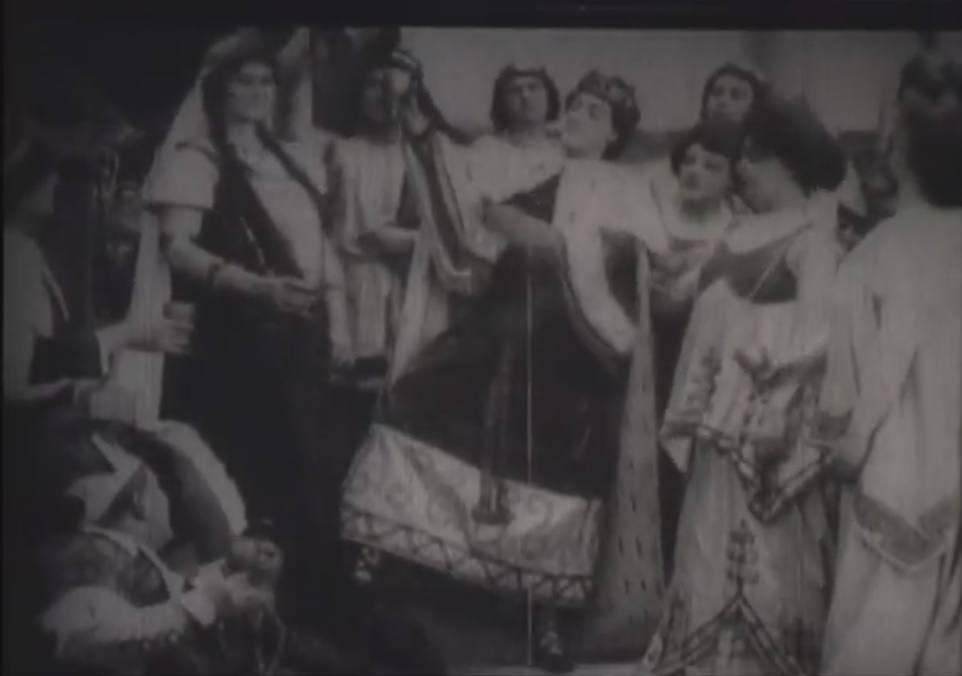
- A frame from the film
- Directed by: Barry O'Neil or Lloyd B. Carleton
- Produced by: Thanhouser Company
- Release date: May 27, 1910
- Running time: 12 minutes, 35 seconds
- Country: United States
- Languages: Silent; English intertitles

The Winter's Tale is a 1910 American silent drama short film produced by Thanhouser Company. The plot is an adaptation of The Winter's Tale by William Shakespeare and requires fore-knowledge of the plot in order to understand the condensed one reel work. The film focuses on the conflict arising from two kings, one of Bohemia and one of Sicily, during a meeting. Queen Hermione enrages her jealous husband, Leontes, by entertaining Polixenes. Leontes decides to kill him with poison, but the plan is foiled by the courtier tasked with the assassination. For this, Leontes imprisons his wife. Hermione gives birth to a daughter and Leontes orders the baby to die out in the wilderness. Hermione is then brought before the court and apparently dies after interrogation. Fifteen years pass and Polixenes confronts and then secretly follows his son, appearing as he declares his intention to marry a shepherdess. The two lovers seek protection with Leontes, the King of Sicily. Mourning and repentant for his past actions, Leontes learns the shepherdess is his daughter and blesses the marriage of the lovers. The royal party goes to see a statue of the late queen Hermoine which is revealed to be alive. The cast includes Anna Rosemond, Frank H. Crane and Martin Faust, but the directorial and production credits for the film are unknown. The production was a success for the Thanhouser Company and the film was met with positive reception following its May 27, 1910 release. The film survives in the Library of Congress, but it is missing the final scene of the production. The surviving print suffers from significant deterioration.

== Plot ==
The Winter's Tale (1910)

The film is a shortened single reel adaption of the play The Winter's Tale by William Shakespeare. The film opens with the meeting of the kings of Bohemia and Sicilia. Hermione, the queen of Sicilia, entertains Polixenes, king of Bohemia. This arouses jealousy in Leontes, the king of Sicilia. Leontes decides to poison Polixenes and orders a courtier to carry out the task. The courtier slips the poison into the cup, but he changes his mind and confesses to the murderous plot. Polixenes and the courtier depart safely, but this enrages the Leontes, who has his wife imprisoned. In prison, Hermione gives birth to a daughter and sends it to her husband, hoping to quell his anger. This further upsets Leontes and he orders the child to be taken out to the wilderness to die. Hermione is then brought before a tribunal, swoons, and is pronounced dead by Paulina.

In a departure from the play, the film shows Hermoine's revival and departure to Paulina's house to dwell in seclusion. The infant princess is raised up by a shepherd of Bohemia. After a time lapse of 15 years, Polixenes confronts his son over his wanderings. He refuses to answer and the king follows him in secret. The prince, disguised as a shepherd, woos the young shepherdess and announces his intention to marry her. The king arrives and forbids it, but a faithful courtier advises them to seek protection of the king of Sicilia. Leontes has long mourned and come to regret his past actions. There, the identity that the shepherdess as his daughter is revealed and the marriage is approved. The royal party is invited to Paulina's house to view a statue of the late queen Hermoine. At the party, Hermoine disguised as a statue, extend her hand and surprises the grieving Leontes, who then rejoices.

== Cast ==
- Anna Rosemond as the Queen of Sicilia
- Martin Faust as the King of Sicilia
- Frank H. Crane as the King of Bohemia
- Amelia Barleon as the Princess of Sicilia
- Alfred Hanlon as the Prince of Bohemia

== Production ==
The adaptation of the scenario is credited to Lloyd F. Lonergan and Gertrude Thanhouser. While the director of the film is not known, two directors are possible. Barry O'Neil was the stage name of Thomas J. McCarthy, who would direct many important Thanhouser pictures, including its first two-reeler, Romeo and Juliet. Lloyd B. Carleton was the stage name of Carleton B. Little, a director who would stay with the Thanhouser Company for a short time, moving to Biograph Company by the summer of 1910. Bowers does not attribute either as the director for this particular production nor does Bowers credit a cameraman. Blair Smith was the first cameraman of the Thanhouser company, but he was soon joined by Carl Louis Gregory who had years of experience as a still and motion picture photographer. The role of the cameraman was uncredited in 1910 productions.

The Thanhouser adaption notably foregoes the famous Shakespearean stage directions: Exit, pursued by a bear and allows Antigonus a peaceful exit. Another difference in the production is that following the collapse and reported death of Hermione. In the play, the audience is aligns with Leontes' view and gives no reason to doubt Hermione's death, but the Thanhouser adaptation shows the mechanism and conspiracy formed by showing Hermione's revival and departure. Instead of using the Shakespeare character of Time to frame the passage of time, the role is performed by an inter-title. The final scene is missing from the surviving print.

== Release and reception ==
The one reel drama, approximately 1000 feet long, was released on May 27, 1910. The surviving fragment in the Library of Congress is 12 minutes, 35 seconds long, but it does not include the final scene with the disguised Queen of Sicilia. The surviving fragment has suffered significant damage due to deterioration. The film was re-released by the Thanhouser Company Film Preservation with a new original score composed and performed by Raymond A. Brubacher.

The film was positively reviewed by the contemporary trade publications that garnered almost universal acclaim. The Moving Picture News stated that this was the first Shakespeare adaptation by an Independent producer and said, "We were asked to inspect and criticize this film, and there was nothing for us to do but give our full approval and applause, which we do right heartily." The New York Dramatic Mirror praised the production and commented on the clear adaptation of Shakespeare's work, resulting in an unusually clear presentation of the story. Another review in The Moving Picture World praised the film in a follow-up to the first review, commenting on the ephemeral nature of the productions by saying "Few, indeed, will be the releases of the month to surpass this, and few, indeed, are the pictures that seem so complete and in every way satisfactory."

A modern review was given by University of York Professor Judith Buchanan. Buchanan recognizes that the film's acting was commended for its action and highlights the acting of the fool, placed prominently in the foreground, and says that it seems as if he has been imported from King Lear. This fool serves as an exaggerated proxy for the audience and filters a set of responses for the audience and goes on to steal the reunion scene with his expressions. Buchanan says that adapting the Shakespeare play to the one reel format required foreknowledge of the subject for audiences to intelligibly follow the subject. Buchanan also notes that this transitional period included lecturers who were hired to give supplementary lectures or commentary on the film being exhibited and the additional commentary for Shakespeare adaptations was desirable.

== See also ==
- List of American films of 1910
