= She's Done it Again =

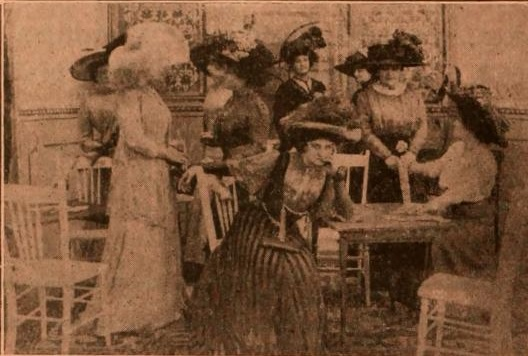
- A surviving film still from an advertisement
- Written by: Lloyd Lonergan
- Produced by: Thanhouser Company
- Release date: March 29, 1910
- Country: United States
- Languages: Silent film English intertitles

She's Done it Again is a 1910 American silent short comedy written by Lloyd Lonergan and produced by the Thanhouser Company in New Rochelle, New York. A thief named Sikes decides to rob a society woman who falsely claimed to have been robbed when she in fact pawned her jewelry. A gentleman thief strikes and robs her, but no one believes her. The thief is caught only by a clever detective. The film was the third release of the Thanhouser company and featured the leading players, Anna Rosemond and Frank H. Crane. The film was met with positive reviews, but is presumed to be lost.

== Plot ==
The official synopsis of the film survives in The Moving Picture World. It states: "Sikes, a gentleman of the Raffles order, reads in the paper that Mrs. Eldridge, a young society woman, who alleged that she had been robbed of her jewels, confessed that she had in reality pawned them - admitting that the robbery was a prearranged affair in which she played the leading role and her maid the supporting one. Sikes decides to have it appear that the lady robbed herself a second time. Disguised as a clergyman, he obtains the jewels. Naturally, everybody believes Mrs. Eldridge [is lying] again [...]! And then - a clever detective turns up and shows [that the] public opinion [is] mistaken by fastening the offense on the real offender." It is likely that Anna Rosemond played the role of Mrs. Eldridge and that Frank H. Crane played the role of Sikes.

== Production ==
The scenario was written by Lloyd F. Lonergan. Lonergan was the writer of both of the previous productions, The Actor's Children and St. Elmo. This release marked the first comedy release of a scenario written by Lonergan and also the first comedy produced by the Thanhouser company. Lonergan was an experienced newspaperman still employed by The New York Evening World while writing scripts for the Thanhouser productions. He was the most important script writer for Thanhouser, averaging 200 scripts a year from 1910 to 1915. Film historian Q. David Bowers attributes the director of the production to Lloyd B. Carleton, the stage name of Carleton B. Little. He would direct a number of films for the Thanhouser Company before moving to the Biograph Company by the summer of 1910. Bowers also credits Blair Smith as the cameraman.

The two known credits in the film are for the leading players Anna Rosemond and Frank H. Crane. Rosemond was one of two leading ladies for the first year of the company and joined in the autumn of 1909, their first year of productions. Crane was involved in the very beginnings of the Thanhouser Company from 1909. Crane was the first leading man of the company and acted in numerous productions before becoming a director at Thanhouser.

== Release and reception ==
The film was released on March 29, 1910 and was met with some positive reviews. The film was known to have an alternate or working title of The Liar and the Thief, which is credited by Bowers and appears in an index in the Moving Picture World. Another reference for the film instead shortens the name to Done it Again. Two reviews for the film would appear in Moving Picture World, with the first praising the release and using a testimonial by Ray Norton to support that it is a good comedy. The second review was more nuanced and descriptive by highlighting the original plot and stating, "The acting is sympathetic - one almost wants to say vigorous, and the photographer has performed his part satisfactorily. The combination of these elements has contributed to the success of the picture."

The film had advertisements announcing its showing in Pennsylvania and Indiana. The film is presumed lost, but a surviving film still exists from a quarter-page advertisement in Billboard.

== See also ==
- List of American films of 1910

== Notes ==
The official synopsis makes a reference that contemporary readers of the trade publication would recognize. The description of Sikes as "a gentleman of the Raffles order" appears to be a reference to the gentleman thief, like A. J. Raffles from Sherlock Holmes. This is supported by the resolution of the crime by a clever detective, in a manner like Sherlock Holmes.
