= The Mad Hermit =

1910 silent short film

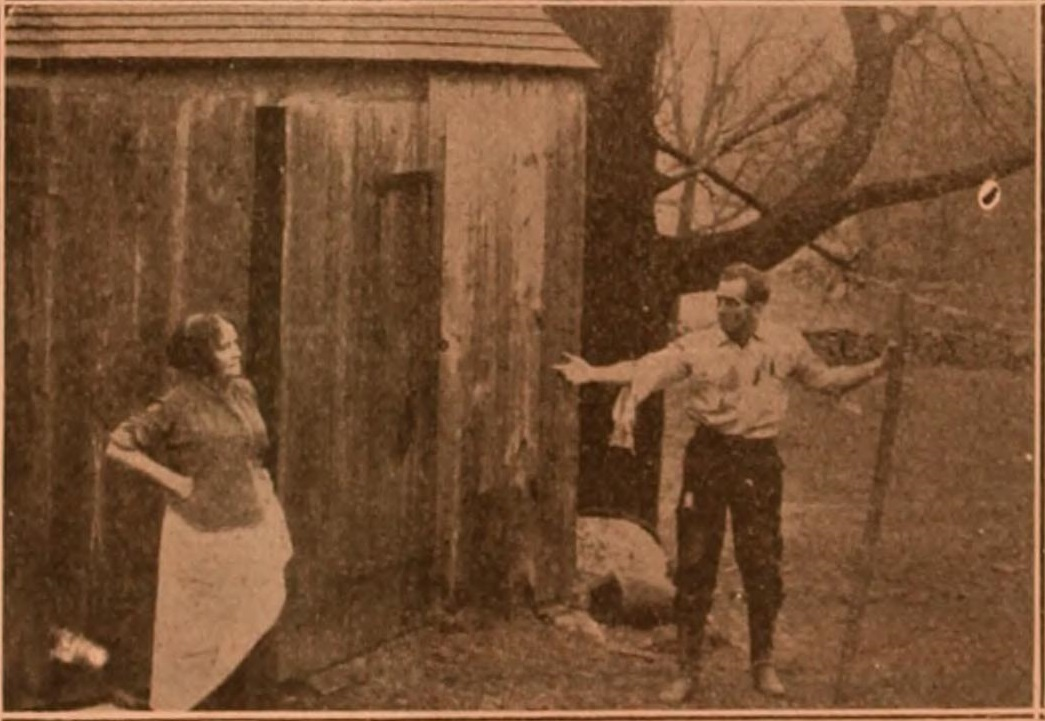
- A surviving film still
- Directed by: Barry O'Neil
- Production company: Thanhouser Company
- Release date: August 9, 1910
- Country: United States
- Languages: Silent film English intertitles

The Mad Hermit is a 1910 American silent short drama film produced by the Thanhouser Company. The story focuses on Harry Willard, who becomes a hermit after his wife and daughter leave him. He spends a quarter of a century in isolation, but he stumbles across a runaway carriage and the woman tosses her baby to him. He runs into the wilderness and prepares to kill it, but he stays his hand when he sees the baby's locket. The parents survive the carriage crash and seek out the hermit, and it is revealed that the baby's mother is the daughter of Harry Willard. Created by a staff of twenty, it was the first film to be produced by the Thanhouser Company. The film was released on August 9, 1910, after the success of the company was ensured, and met with positive reception by critics. The film is presumed lost.

== Plot ==
Though the film is presumed lost, a synopsis survives in The Moving Picture World from August 13, 1910. It states: "The story centers on Harry Willard, a plodding farmer. A city gentleman promises Harry's frivolous wife a life of ease and luxury - and it is the old, old story. She takes her tiny daughter, Agnes, with her, and leaves a note announcing the fact for Harry. The young farmer, who loves his wife and child with an all-consuming love, loses his reason as he reads the announcement of his betrayal. Although without the bare means for his subsistence, he searches for days for his loved ones. Eventually the strain, mental and physical, tells on him - he comes out of it all a maniac. His wrath takes the form of an aversion to all mankind. He wants to forget the world that has treated him so ill - he decides to become a hermit and betakes himself to a desolate cave, where he spends the years execrating humanity. A quarter century goes by. Rarely in that time does he venture on beaten paths for fear that he may meet a hated human, but one day he forgets his resolve long enough to cross a carriage drive. He hears the clatter of hooves and sights a horse tearing toward him with a swaying carriage and screaming occupants - runaway! As the carriage passes by him, a woman flings a bundle to him; he catches it and finds it a pink and white bit of humanity. Dazed he runs into the wilderness with a baby and makes for his cave. Arrived at the cave the maniac resolves to even his score with society by taking the babe's life. But his eyes light on the baby's locket and his hand is stayed. For the locket bears a picture of the child of the wife who betrayed him!"

"The parents of the baby have miraculously escaped death in the crash of their carriage and trace the strange creature who rescued the child to his lair. They arrive as he ponders upon the picture in the locket and tries to recall the original of it. The babe is the daughter of the original and its mother the hermit's daughter, Agnes - the one-time tot whom the deserting wife took with her. A wife and mother, she is quite a mature woman now - but her features are unchanged. The face appears familiar to the hermit and he tries to place it. Eventually he succeeds. The shock of recognition dazes him - and changes him. The light of sanity returns to his eyes. His reason is restored. He takes to his breast the daughter whom he had lost and found again. She takes him from his forest home and back to the civilization that had tricked him. But the kindly care and love his daughter bestows on him to act in a measure as a recompense for the wrong done him in the long ago, and with the passing years the bitterness passes from his being. The picture touches the heartstrings; it will please to a certainty."

== Production ==
The Mad Hermit was the first film to be produced by the Thanhouser Company, but the first release was The Actor's Children. The writer of the scenario is unknown. The film was shot in the autumn of 1909. Edwin Thanhouser would later describe the production as, "...a rather lamentable affair. It included everything from murder through robbery and a love story. It boasted enough material for 15 plots." According to Q. David Bowers, Edwin Thanhouser felt that the production had many amateurish aspects and held off on releasing the film until the reputation of the company was secured. The film was directed by Barry O'Neil, the stage name of Thomas J. McCarthy. O'Neil would direct many important Thanhouser pictures, including its first two-reeler, Romeo and Juliet. There are no known credits for the cast, but Anna Rosemond and Frank H. Crane are two possible actors that were prominent players in 1910. Involved with the company since its beginnings, Anna Rosemond was one of two leading ladies of the Thanhouser company in this era. Frank H. Crane was a leading male actor of the company and also involved since the very beginnings of the Thanhouser Company. Bowers states that most of the credits are fragmentary for 1910 Thanhouser productions. A later statement by Edwin Thanhouser would state that 20 persons, including the director and cameraman, were involved in the production. A surviving film still leaves open the possibility of identifying two characters.

== Release and reception ==
The single reel drama, approximately 1,000 feet long, was released on August 9, 1910. The film had a wide national release, with advertisements including those in Kansas, California, Arizona, Nebraska, Washington, South Dakota, Pennsylvania, and Texas. An advertisement for the Province Theatre suggests that the film arrived in British Columbia, Canada within days of its release.

The film received praise from critics with The Moving Picture World stating, "[It is a] picture which touches the heart and arouses the strongest emotions. It can be readily understood how a man might become a maniac under such circumstances. The loss of a wife and daughter is sufficient to overthrow reason. That a man should be a hermit afterward seems not unusual. Then comes the excitement of the runaway, the rescue of the baby and the discovery of his daughter, with returning reason and love to follow during his declining years. The emotions will be strongly aroused by this picture, and that will make it popular. Whatever touches the heart is always popular, and this seems to appeal with unusual power." The New York Dramatic Mirror offered minor praise for the film for the production and its acting.

== See also ==
- List of American films of 1910
