= Latchkey =

Latchkey or Latch-key may refer to:

- A key used to open a latch
- Latchkey kid, a child who returns from school to an empty home because their parents are away at work
- The Latchkey, a 1910 film by the Thanhouser Company
- Operation Latchkey, a series of 38 nuclear test explosions conducted in 1966 and 1967 at the Nevada Test Site
- The Latch-Key Child, the first album by the child rapper A+
