= St. Elmo (1910 Thanhouser film) =

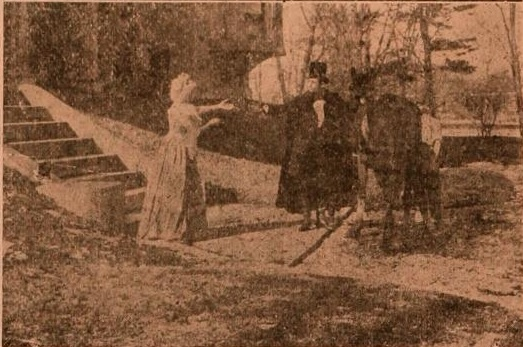
- A film still from the lost work
- Directed by: Barry O'Neil or Lloyd B. Carleton
- Written by: Adapted by Lloyd Lonergan
- Produced by: Thanhouser Company
- Release date: March 22, 1910
- Country: United States
- Languages: Silent film English intertitles

St. Elmo is a 1910 American silent short drama produced by the Thanhouser Company. The scenario was adapted by Lloyd Lonergan from Augusta Jane Evans's 1866 novel of the same name. Frank H. Crane and Anna Rosemond play the leading roles in the simplified plot that was reliant on inter-titles to tell the story. The film follows St. Elmo who is engaged to his cousin Agnes, being betrayed by his friend Dick Hammond who has an affair with Agnes. St. Elmo challenges and kills Hammond in a duel. A young girl, Edna witnesses the duel and leads Agnes and the sheriff off the trail. St. Elmo disappears and returns five years later to woo Edna. She rejects then accepts his affections only to stop him from committing suicide. The production was met with mixed reviews by critics, but was successful. The film is presumed lost.

== Plot ==
The plot was adapted from Augusta Jane Evans's 1867 novel St. Elmo. The actual production was greatly shortened for the purposes of conveying the plot of the film.

The synopsis in The Moving Picture World states: "St. Elmo, a wealthy young man, is betrothed to his cousin Agnes. Dick Hammond, St. Elmo's chum, is studying for the ministry. As soon as he is ordained he is to take charge of a church built for him by St. Elmo.

Hammond, however, takes St. Elmo's friendship lightly and makes love to Agnes in secret. The affair is discovered by St. Elmo, who, in a rage at Hammond's perfidy, challenges him to a duel. The false friend loses his life in the ensuing combat.

Edna, the granddaughter of the village blacksmith, strays upon the scene of the duel, an uninvited witness. St. Elmo is forced to flee the country. He is pursued by Agnes and the sheriff. Edna tells her first lie when she deceives St. Elmo's pursuers as to his direction and leads them completely off the trail. St. Elmo makes good his escape.

On the day that Edna witnesses the duel her grandfather dies, leaving her alone in the world. She is adopted by St. Elmo's mother. Five years later the fugitive returns. Edna recognizes him as the victor of the dual but he does not remember having met her.

He discovers that he loves the girl. Edna rejects his suit, declaring that she never would marry a man who had taken a human life. In desperation, St. Elmo attempts suicide, choosing as a spot the grave of Dick Hammond, but is swerved from his purpose by Edna, who relents and promises him her love and sympathy. St. Elmo decides that life is worth living if but for her sake."

== Cast ==
- Frank H. Crane as St. Elmo
- Anna Rosemond as Agnes
- Gertrude Thanhouser
- Carey L. Hastings

== Production ==
Written in 1866, Augusta Jane Evans domestic novel St. Elmo became one of the best-selling novels of the 19th century. Its popularity would spur the creation of popular consumer products, parodies and even the names of several towns. Evans was concerned about how the novel's themes would be portrayed on the stage and did not approve the first script for a St. Elmo play until 1909. It is also unknown if Evans was aware of any intention to adapt the novel for the screen. Lloyd Lonergan adapted the play for the Thanhouser Company. The Book News Monthly said that Lonergan received a share of interest in the company for his good work in producing the scenario. Lonergan already had a single share of 100 total shares of the company from the initial $10,000 in capital in 1909.

The director of the film is uncertain. The film has been credited to both Barry O'Neil and/or Lloyd B. Carleton by film historian Q. David Bowers. It is not known for certain who directed or if both them played a directorial a role in the production. Barry O'Neil was the stage name of Thomas J. McCarthy, who would direct many important Thanhouser pictures, including its first two-reeler, Romeo and Juliet. Lloyd B. Carleton was the stage name of Carleton B. Little, a director who would stay with the Thanhouser Company for a short time, moving to Biograph Company by the summer of 1910. The confusion between the directing credits stems from the industry practice of not crediting the film directors, even in studio news releases. There is also dispute over the cameraman credit for the film. Bower credits Blair Smith as the cameraman, but the American Film Institute adds that Carl Louis Gregory also could have been the cameraman. Smith was the first cameraman of the Thanhouser company, but he was soon joined by Gregory who had years of experience as a still and motion picture photographer. Bowers believes that numerous releases were produced with Gregory operating the camera, but the role was uncredited in the 1910 era. Anna Rosemond was one of two leading ladies for the first year of the company. Rosemond joined in the autumn of 1909 and in their first year of productions. Frank H. Crane was involved in the very beginnings of the Thanhouser Company from 1909. Crane's was the first leading man of the company and acted in numerous productions before becoming a director at Thanhouser.

Bowers notes that St. Elmo was filmed in a mansion built in 1759, but the name and location of the structure is unknown. The actual date of the filming is unknown. During the weeks leading up to the release, a spy for Thomas Edison's production company recorded details surrounding Thanhouser's production, including the filming of Thanhouser's first release, The Actor's Children. The spy, W. E. Lowenkamp, had a New York State Detective license. Lowenkamp's reports suggest the possibility of filming in a house on March 10, 1910 and the intention to film the following morning, but it is unknown if this was related to St. Elmo's filming. Lowenkamp would speak to Edwin Thanhouser's sister in law, Carey L. Hastings, who took him as a real estate salesman was in film. Bower's reprints the report, "The sister-in-law said the house they were using to take pictures would just suit Mr. Thanhouser, so I called a real estate office and gave them the tip so they will try and sell the house to Mr. Thanhouser and cover me." The film also included Gertrude Thanhouser, the wife of Edwin Thanhouser. According to family tradition, she only appeared in this one film.

== Release and reception ==
The single reel drama, approximately 860 ft, was released on March 22, 1910 by the Thanhouser Company. The film was shown in Tennessee, Ohio, Washington, and Pennsylvania. An advertisement in Indiana lists "St. Elmo" in apparent reference to a "great Thanhouser film". Edwin Thanhouser later stated that there were ten copies of the film at first and the films were primarily distributed to the exchanges that had purchased the first work, The Actor's Children. The desire for St. Elmo resulted in the production of fifteen more copies to meet the demand.

Reviews for the film were mixed. The New York Dramatic Mirror provided a positive review which praised the ability of the writer to adapt the work to film, but this was diminished slightly because of the films dependence on title-cards. The review also stated that the acting was excellent, but not expressive enough and concluded that the film was "a notable one among the Independent releases". The Moving Picture World provided another positive review, praising the adaptation that simplified the plot and found no fault with the production. The Morning Telegraph found no fault with the story, but found fault with the excessive use of inter-titles. The reviewer also noted that the only strong scene in the film is the duel scene, but Edna's wanderings made her appear to be insane. The edition of April 16, 1910 of The Moving Picture World provided three testimonials that the film was of excellent quality and one attributed a doubling of patrons because of the film. The film is presumed lost.

== See also ==
- List of American films of 1910

== Notes ==
The 1910 edition of St. Elmo by Hurst & Company is sometimes marked as having been drawn from a movie. This is incorrect, it was designed to appeal to theater patrons and copyrighted in January 1910. Another 1910 publication by M.A Donahue includes photographs marked as having been produced by Lawrence Co. of Chicago. It does not indicate that it is from the Thanhouser production.
