= An Assisted Elopement =

An Assisted Elopement may refer to:

- An Assisted Elopement (1910 film), an American silent short comedy produced by the Thanhouser Company
- An Assisted Elopement (1912 Selig film), a silent film short directed by Colin Campbell
- An Assisted Elopement (1912 American film), produced by the American Film Manufacturing Company
