= The Actor's Children =

1910 film by Barry O'Neil

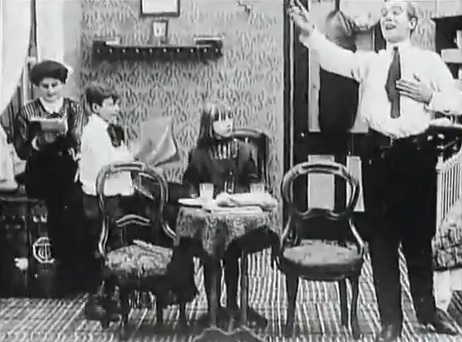
- The Actor, his wife and the two children.
- Directed by: Barry O'Neil
- Written by: Lloyd Lonergan
- Produced by: Edwin Thanhouser
- Starring: Orilla Smith; Yale Boss; Frank Hall Crane; Nicholas Jordan
- Cinematography: Blair W. Smith
- Edited by: Gertrude Thanhouser
- Distributed by: Thanhouser Company
- Release date: March 15, 1910
- Country: United States
- Languages: Silent film English intertitles

The Actor's Children is a 1910 American silent short drama written by Lloyd Lonergan and produced by the Thanhouser Company in New Rochelle, New York. The film features Orilla Smith, Yale Boss, Frank Hall Crane and Nicholas Jordan. The production was not the first film subject by the company, but it was the first to be released. Both Barry O'Neil and Lloyd B. Carleton have been credited as the director of the production. Edwin Thanhouser stated that 19 copies of the film were produced and distributed to dealers.

The film begins with two unemployed parents obtaining employment in an upcoming theater production. Shortly after returning home, the landlady shows up and demands the rent, but can not collect. She gives them one week, but the theater production does not manifest, and the parents again search for work. While they are out, the landlady finds a tenant and puts the children out on the street. They end up dancing for an organ grinder and are saved by a theater manager who puts them on his vaudeville bill. The parents come into a fortune and are reunited by their children at the theater. The film was met with positive reviews and some criticism for its acting and scenario, but the industry had reasons to encourage the success of Edwin Thanhouser's company. A print of the film exists, but it was the subject of nitrate deterioration.

== Plot ==
The Actor's Children (1910)

The plot of the film was best convened through a published synopsis in trade, which introduced the names of the cast and the backstory. Eugenie Freeman and Paul Temple, marry and have two children, a boy and a girl. The parents have been unemployed, but the film starts with the parents finding work in an upcoming production at a theater. As they return home, they are interrupted by the landlady, Mrs. O'Brien, who demands the rent. The landlady does not care about the family's misfortune and is upset when she cannot collect. She provides one week for the Temple family to pay up.

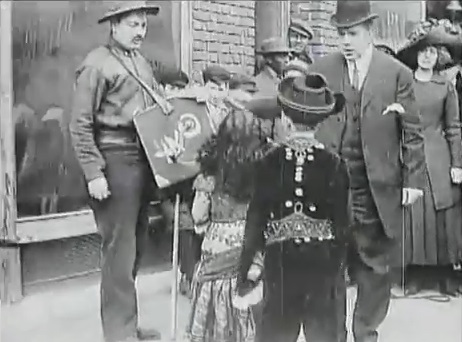
The theater manager rescues the children from the organ grinder

The production is postponed and the parents are out looking for work when a prospective tenant appears. Mrs. O'Brien shows him the room and he is interested, but does not know what to do with the children. Mrs. O'Brien puts the children out onto the street, where they dance to the music played by an organ grinder. The organ grinder earns more money from their dancing and he entices the children to return to his hovel and teaches them to dance. The organ grinder instructs them to dance for money. The children are rescued by a theater manager and finds them a place in the theater program.

In the meantime, the parents have searched for their children and suddenly come into a fortune when a relative bequeaths a large sum of money to them. The parents search for their children in large gatherings and find their children dancing on the vaudeville bill from their theater box. The family is reunited and the film concludes.

== Cast ==
- Frank H. Crane as the actor (adult male lead)
- Orilla Smith as the actor's daughter (little girl)
- Yale Boss as the actor's son (little boy)
- Nicholas Jordan as a comedian

== Production ==
The script for the production was written by Lloyd F. Lonergan, who employed the deus ex machina dramatic technique in the conclusion of the plot. In film, this is the sudden inheritance and parents finding their children in the theater. The two children, Orilla Smith and Yale Boss, were child actors with prior film experience and did not have any further known connection to the Thanhouser Company after the production. The cameraman, Blair Smith, used a camera rented by the Columbia Phonograph Company and had its inventor, Joseph Bianchi, assist in the camera's operation and use. The director of has both been credited to Barry O'Neil and Lloyd B. Carleton in numerous trade sources. Smith was the first cameraman of the Thanhouser Company, but this film was not the Thanhouser Company's first subject. Instead, it was The Mad Hermit produced in autumn 1909 and shelved until August 9, 1910. The exact order of the productions is not known, but a work titled Aunt Nancy Telegraphs was filmed in December 1909 and never released. Certain parts of The Actor's Children were produced in the last week of February 1910.

The director of the film is not known, but two possibles exist. Barry O'Neil was the stage name of Thomas J. McCarthy, who would direct many important Thanhouser pictures, including its first two-reeler, Romeo and Juliet. Lloyd B. Carleton was the stage name of Carleton B. Little, a director who would stay with the Thanhouser Company until moving to the Biograph Company by the summer of 1910. The confusion between the directing credits stems from the industry practice of not crediting the film directors, even in studio news releases. Q. David Bowers says that the attribution of these early directors often comes from a collection of contemporary publications or interviews.

== Release ==
The single reel drama, approximately 1000 ft (0.3 km) , was released on March 15, 1910, by the Thanhouser Company. In later years, Edwin Thanhouser recalled that 19 copies of the film were produced and sent out to dealers throughout the United States. Of these 19 copies produced, ten were returned, some with letters of interest in future Thanhouser productions. The film was viewed across the United States with advertisements for showings in Pennsylvania, Wisconsin, Kansas, and Washington

== Reception and impact ==
The Actor's Children was released with enthusiasm and positive reviews in trade publications. The Moving Picture World reviews would be favorable and without much criticism, even calling the acting convincing. A more honest review in The New York Dramatic Mirror was written by a reviewer who was pleased with the production, but offered criticism about the production's weaker aspects. The reviewer found there to be too much emphasis on the unimportant parts and a lack of emotion from the actors, and the child actors performance was faulted by repeatedly looking at the camera. Critical reception of the film may not have been entirely neutral for a number of reasons. Edwin Thanhouser was a well-liked gentleman who had many friends in the Patents Company that likely wanted him to succeed. Furthermore, writers in the magazines hoped that Independents would succeed and challenge the Patents Company's stranglehold on the industry. Also, film critics and reviewers of the era would balance the negativity of even the worst films with some favorable aspects. Even without any ulterior motives, the film may have been worthy of a favorable review.

The release managed to survive against considerable odds, but the surviving print is not without severe faults. The surviving print has considerable nitrate deterioration and very poor picture quality in certain parts. This film survives in the Academy of Motion Picture Arts and Sciences film archive. The Actor's Children was preserved by the Academy Film Archive in 2007.

== Notes ==
The backstory in the published synopsis differs from the actual production in a few aspects. When the organ grinder takes the children back to his hovel, the intertitle states they are forced to dance. In the synopsis, it states the children are instructed to dance to the hurdy-gurdy. The organ grinder does not play a hurdy-gurdy. In the published synopsis, the parents are named Eugenie Freeman and Paul Temple. However, the letter the father receives is addressed to Paul Tilden. The letter informs him of Joseph Tilden's death and of the $100,000 inheritance.

== See also ==
- List of American films of 1910
