= A Thanksgiving Surprise =

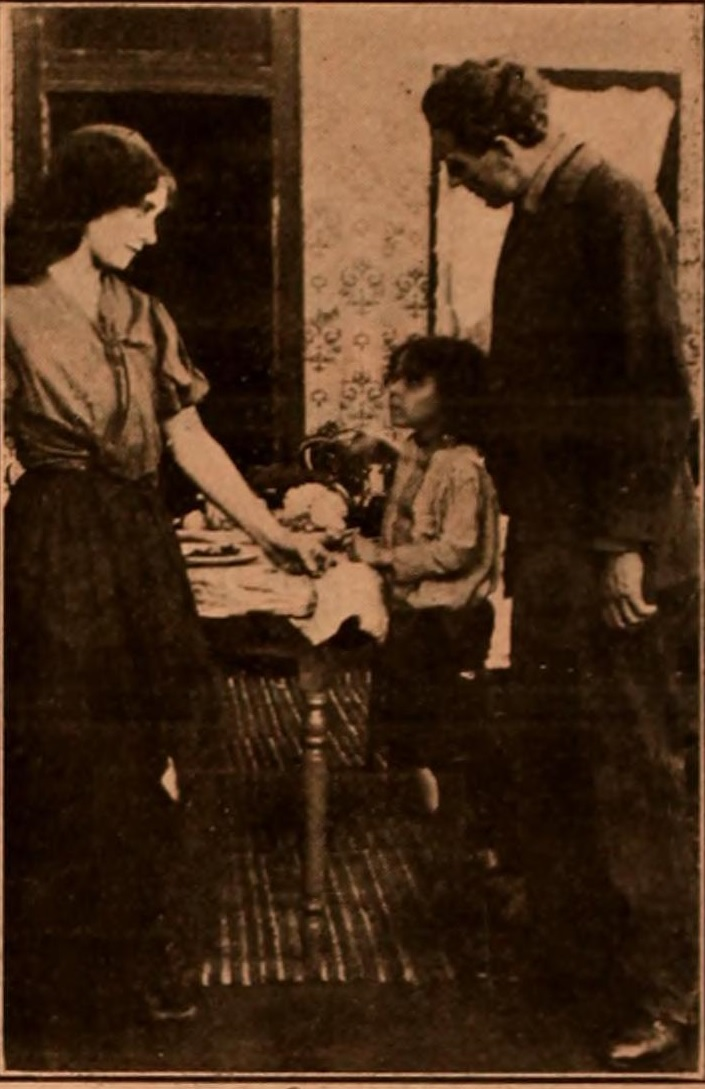
- A film still from the lost film
- Produced by: Thanhouser Company
- Distributed by: Motion Picture Distributing and Sales Company
- Release date: November 22, 1910
- Country: United States
- Languages: Silent film English intertitles

A Thanksgiving Surprise is a 1910 American silent short drama produced by the Thanhouser Company. The film follows Jack Clyde, a young man who lives a vain and idle life in the city with his rich friends. His wealthy uncle decides to test the morale character and has his lawyers announce his death and giving his fortune to charity. When Jack learns of his death, he is left penniless and is shunned by his friends, but assisted by the poor. Jack struggles to survive, but decides to host a Thanksgiving dinner for those poorer than himself. His uncle sees Jack has learned his lesson and secretly prepares a feast set while Jack sleeps. After the guest arrives, the uncle reveals himself and all ends well. The film was released on November 22, 1910, and was met with favorable reviews. The film is presumed lost.

== Plot ==
Though the film is presumed lost, a synopsis survives in The Moving Picture World from November 26, 1910. It states: "Jack Clyde is a rich young fellow who has been brought up by his wealthy uncle in a small Western town. Jack decides that he wants to move to New York and is indulged in this whim by his uncle, who sends with the lad as valet a faithful old servant, who has his welfare at heart. In the city Jack rents expensive apartments, and leads a vain, idle life. Jack's uncle hears of his conduct and devises a scheme whereby he can make a thorough test of the boy. He instructs his lawyers to announce his death, that the entire fortune has gone to charity, and Jack has been left penniless. Jack is turned out of his rooms and shunned by his rich friends. Among the very poor, whom he formerly despised, he is treated as a comrade. They share with him their last crust, and he ends by marrying them, and falling in love with a humble little flower girl. Jack finally secures a situation as a porter in a hotel. His uncle discovers that he is planning to give a Thanksgiving dinner to all those poorer than himself and decides that Jack has learned his lesson. Jack brings to his poor room a few meager provisions that his week's salary has permitted him to buy. While waiting for his guests to arrive Jack goes to sleep. His uncle and the old servant who have been watching him closely, seize upon this opportunity to enter Jack's room and substitute for his poor meal a real Thanksgiving feast. The guests arrive, their host awakes, uncle returns, and Jack is assured that his prosperity is real and not a dream."

== Cast ==
- Marie Eline likely as the newspaper boy.
- Frances Gibson is claimed to be the flower girl, but this is disputed.
- William Russell

== Production ==
The writer of the scenario is unknown, but it was most likely Lloyd Lonergan. He was an experienced newspaperman employed by The New York Evening World while writing scripts for the Thanhouser productions. The film director is unknown, but it may have been Barry O'Neil or Lucius J. Henderson. Cameramen employed by the company during this era included Blair Smith, Carl Louis Gregory, and Alfred H. Moses, Jr. though none are specifically credited. The role of the cameraman was uncredited in 1910 productions. Marie Eline was cast in the film, likely as the newspaper boy. Eline had previously played a newspaper boy in Not Guilty. The role of the flower girl has been claimed to be Frances Gibson by an answer column in Motion Picture Story Magazine. This is disputable because Gibson is known only to have a single credit with the Thanhouser Company, in the 1912 release of Nicholas Nickleby. Around this time Gibson was appearing in Solax Studios productions. Both immediate before and after her only Thanhouser credit, Gibson was employed by Solax, leading Bowers to speculate that her appearance in that one film may have been as a special project. A different film still shows William Russell and opens the possibility of identifying the other actors. The other cast credits are unknown, but many 1910 Thanhouser productions are fragmentary. In late 1910, the Thanhouser company released a list of the important personalities in their films. The list includes G.W. Abbe, Justus D. Barnes, Frank H. Crane, Irene Crane, Marie Eline, Violet Heming, Martin J. Faust, Thomas Fortune, George Middleton, Grace Moore, John W. Noble, Anna Rosemond, Mrs. George Walters.

== Release and reception ==
The single reel drama, approximately 1,000 feet long, was released on November 22, 1910. The drama film was sometimes labeled as a comedy by advertisers. The film had a wide national release and was shown in theaters in North Carolina, South Dakota, Washington, Kansas, Pennsylvania, California,. Though Hawaii was not yet a state, it was also shown as a new release in July 1912.

The film was positively reviewed by critics. Walton of The Moving Picture News affirmed, stating that the film was a "...well-staged, naturally acted story with a lesson. There is pathos and stern reality mixed in with fidelity and anxiety, the whole making a story of entrancing and edifying power." The Moving Picture World summarized the film and remarked, "The contrasts in the delineation of human nature constitute the principal points of interest, and they are worked out with full appreciation of dramatic varieties. The implied false friends have a good many counterparts, and the way they are depicted here is too graphic to be misunderstood." The New York Dramatic Mirror took a swipe at Bison Pictures of the New York Motion Picture Company and the Powers Picture Plays by praising the camera posing of the film and acknowledging the acting of the flower girl to be well-portrayed.

== See also ==
- List of American films of 1910
