= An Assisted Elopement (1910 film) =

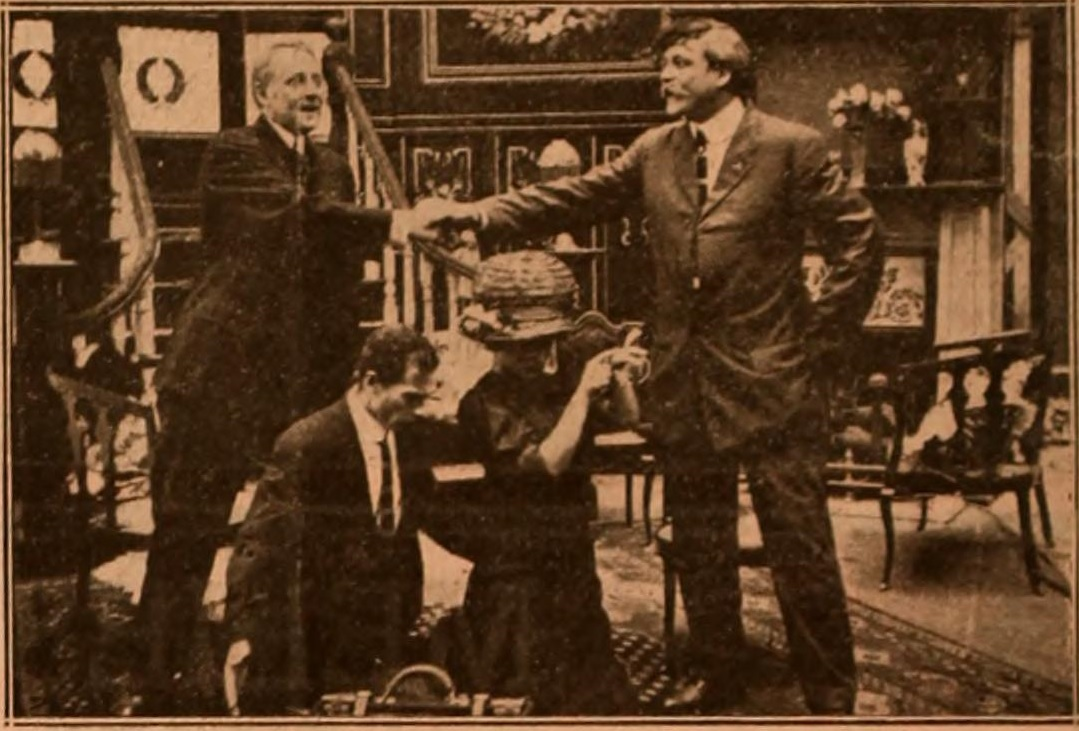
- A surviving film still
- Produced by: Thanhouser Company
- Release date: August 30, 1910
- Country: United States
- Languages: Silent film English intertitles

An Assisted Elopement is a 1910 American silent short comedy produced by the Thanhouser Company. The film focuses on Gladys and Charlie who meet each other on the train home and they become romantically interested in each other. It turns out their parents are friends and wish for them to get married, souring the relationship between them. In a ploy to get their children to elope, the fathers become bitter enemies in public and the couple elopes much to their enjoyment and intention. A surviving film still shows several of members of the cast, including Frank H. Crane, Violet Heming, and Alphonse Ethier. The film was released on August 30, 1910, and saw a wide national release. The film is presumed lost.

== Plot ==
The film is presumed lost as no known surviving copies of the film exist. A synopsis of the film was published in The Moving Picture World. It states: "Glade and Sears are next door neighbors and old friends. Glade has a daughter, while Sears has a son. The young people have never met, being away at school while the old folks have been cementing their friendship. As the two men own adjoining places, they believe that the best thing for the younger people to do is to get married. So they try to bring this about. Gladys Glade and Charlie Sears meet on the train while they are returning home and start a flirtation. Perhaps they would have married in the end, if the old folks hadn't 'butted in.' As it is, they lose all interest in each other. Then the fathers try another tack. They decide to be bitter enemies in public, hoping the opposition will bring the children together. The new plan works like a charm, and Gladys and Charlie, realizing their parents' shortcomings, decide to elope. They do so, much to the satisfaction of Glade and Sears."

== Cast ==
- Frank H. Crane
- Violet Heming
- Alphonse Ethier

== Production ==
The writer of the scenario is unknown, but it was most likely Lloyd Lonergan. He was an experienced newspaperman employed by The New York Evening World while writing scripts for the Thanhouser productions. The film director is unknown, but it may have been Barry O'Neil. Film historian Q. David Bowers does not attribute a cameraman for this production, but at least two possible candidates exist. Blair Smith was the first cameraman of the Thanhouser company, but he was soon joined by Carl Louis Gregory who had years of experience as a still and motion picture photographer. The role of the cameraman was uncredited in 1910 productions. Identification of three members of the cast come from a surviving film still in a Thanhouser advertisement. Other credits may have included Anna Rosemond, one of two leading ladies of the Thanhouser company in this era. One of the actors in the film was Frank H. Crane, a leading male actor of the company and also involved since the very beginnings of the Thanhouser Company. Bowers states that most of the credits are fragmentary for 1910 Thanhouser productions.

== Release and reception ==
The one reel comedy, approximately 1,000 feet long, was released on August 30, 1910. The film saw a wide national release, with advertisements in Kansas, Wisconsin, Pennsylvania, North Carolina, Nebraska, Arizona, and Oklahoma. The film was also shown by the Province Theatre in Vancouver, British Columbia, Canada. Though it had been released years prior to its examination by the Pennsylvania State Board of Censors of Moving Pictures, the film was approved without need any modifications or censoring.

The New York Dramatic Mirror review was positive despite the plot having been produced previously. The reviewer wrote, "This film story has been done before and by an Independent producer, which prompts the wonder if the Independents would not do well to avoid borrowing - at least from each other. The Thanhouser producers have the excuse, however, in this particular case that the former telling of the story was a sad failure, while this one has pleasing qualities. Two fathers are determined that their children shall wed each other, but the young folks object to such cut and dried procedure, whereat the fathers pretend to quarrel and forbid the children to love, and the perverse youngsters at once elope, assisted secretly by the parents. The trick of having the boy join the girl in her apparent banishment by hiding in her trunk is the one discordant note in an otherwise plausible and human comedy." The Moving Picture World was more brief, acknowledging the plausibility of the scenario and that the acting was convincing. The Moving Picture News review was also brief, stating, "The film calls for shrieks of laughter; it deserved it, for it is built upon human nature. A story anyone can see and enjoy." In 1912, the American Film Manufacturing Company released the similarly titled An Assisted Elopement and the Selig Polyscope Company released its own An Assisted Elopement.

== See also ==
- List of American films of 1910
