= The Third Degree (1913 film) =

1913 film directed by Barry O'Neil

- Directed by: Barry O'Neil
- Written by: Charles Klein (play & scenario)
- Produced by: Lubin Manufacturing Company
- Cinematography: Fred Chaston
- Distributed by: General Film Company
- Release date: December 29, 1913
- Running time: 5 reels
- Country: United States
- Language: English

The Third Degree is a lost 1913 silent film melodrama directed by Barry O'Neil and produced by the Lubin Manufacturing Company. It was based on the 1909 Broadway play by Charles Klein.

== Cast ==
- Gaston Bell - Howard Jeffries, Jr.
- Robert Dunbar - Howard Jeffries, Sr.
- Carlotta Doti - Annie Jeffries
- Robert Whittier - Robert Underwood
- George Soule Spencer - Richard Brewster
- Lila Leslie - Mrs. Howard Jeffries, Sr. (*as Lilie Leslie)
- Bartley McCullum - Captain Clinton
- Bernard Siegel - Dr. Bernstein
- Robert Graham - Bellboy
