= The Old Curiosity Shop (1911 film) =

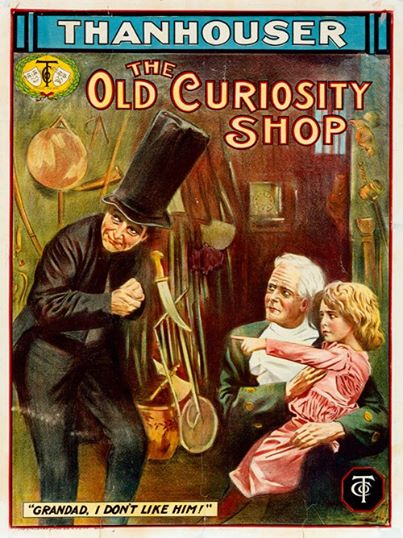
- A poster for the film
- Directed by: Barry O'Neil
- Produced by: Thanhouser Company
- Distributed by: Motion Picture Distributing and Sales Company
- Release date: January 20, 1911
- Running time: 1 reel
- Country: United States
- Languages: Silent film English inter-titles

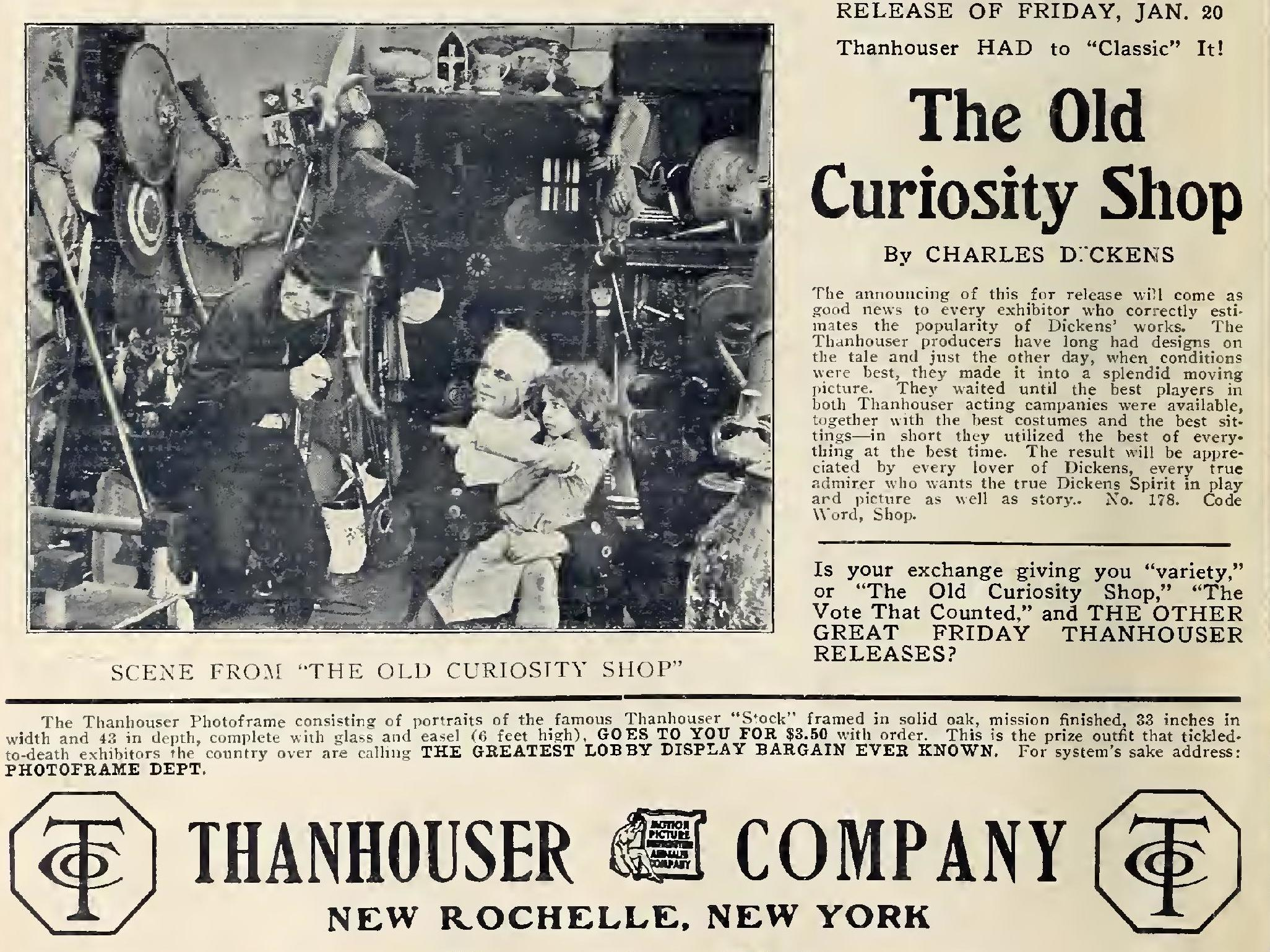
The Old Curiosity Shop 1911 film ad in Moving Picture News

The Old Curiosity Shop is a 1911 American silent short drama film produced by the Thanhouser Company. The film is an adaptation of the 1841 novel The Old Curiosity Shop by Charles Dickens that was limited to the time constrictions of the single reel format. The film focuses on the grandfather who gambles into poverty and the consequences which eventually claim the life of Little Nell. Its survival and attribution as a Thanhouser film was noted by Kamilla Elliott in her 2003 book Rethinking the Novel/Film Debate under the title Little Nell. In 2012, the work was confirmed to be a Thanhouser production at the Pordenone Silent Film Festival. The identification of the film as Little Nell arose due to head of the film having been lost.

== Plot ==
Adapted from The Old Curiosity Shop by Charles Dickens, the film has been shortened and streamlined for the single reel format. The film focuses on a grandfather who gambles himself into poverty. He dotes on his granddaughter, Little Nell, and desires to give her every luxury. The grandfather turns to gambling to try and earn money, firmly believing that luck would favor him. His gambling results in losing everything and Nell fears that he will be taken away to an asylum. At night, Nell flees with him and they find refuge and shelter with Mrs. Jarley. The grandfather, seeking to win money, robs Nell of her money and proceeds to gamble it away. The grandfather is coerced by men to steal to pay the debts, but Nell intervenes and flees with her grandfather again. Exhausted and feeble in health, Nell meets a kind schoolmaster and appeals to him for aid before falling unconscious at his feet. The schoolmaster takes the two in, but it is too late to save Nell and she dies. Her grandfather is brokenhearted and is found dead on her grave several days later.

== Cast ==
- Frank H. Crane as the grandfather
- Marie Eline as Little Nell
- Harry Benham
- Marguerite Snow
- Alphonse Ethier
- William Bowman

== Production ==
The film is a condensed adaptation of Dickens' work. Reviewers specifically highlighted the attention to detail and the limitations of the format when condensing the work to a single reel format. The atmosphere of the film and the portrayal was deemed to be natural except for the scenes in open. The director of the film was Barry O'Neil, but the scenario writer and cameraman are uncredited. The surviving status of the film yields to the possibility of further information being gained on the production and details of the work.

== Release and reception ==
The single reel drama, approximately 1,000 feet long, was released on January 20, 1911. The film was promoted by the Thanhouser Company as a film that every Dickens' lover would enjoy. Critics reviewed the film favorably. Walton of The Moving Picture News wrote, "To a lover of Dickens a pure delight. The salient points of the story have been taken and thus the film moves along so as to forge an intelligent conception of the original. ... The condensation has been thoughtfully done, by one who evidently knows the possibilities and limitations of the reel. A worthy production that must needs win its reward." According to Thanhouser Company Film Preservation, the film was confirmed as a Thanhouser production after its screening at Pordenone Silent Film Festival in 2012. The film was listed under the title of "Little Nell" from the first intertitle because the head of the film is missing. However, the 2003 book Rethinking the Novel/Film Debate by Kamilla Elliott correctly attributes "Little Nell" as a Thanhouser production. The film is not the first known adaptation of the work—Essanay Studios released an identically titled film in 1909.
