= A Dainty Politician =

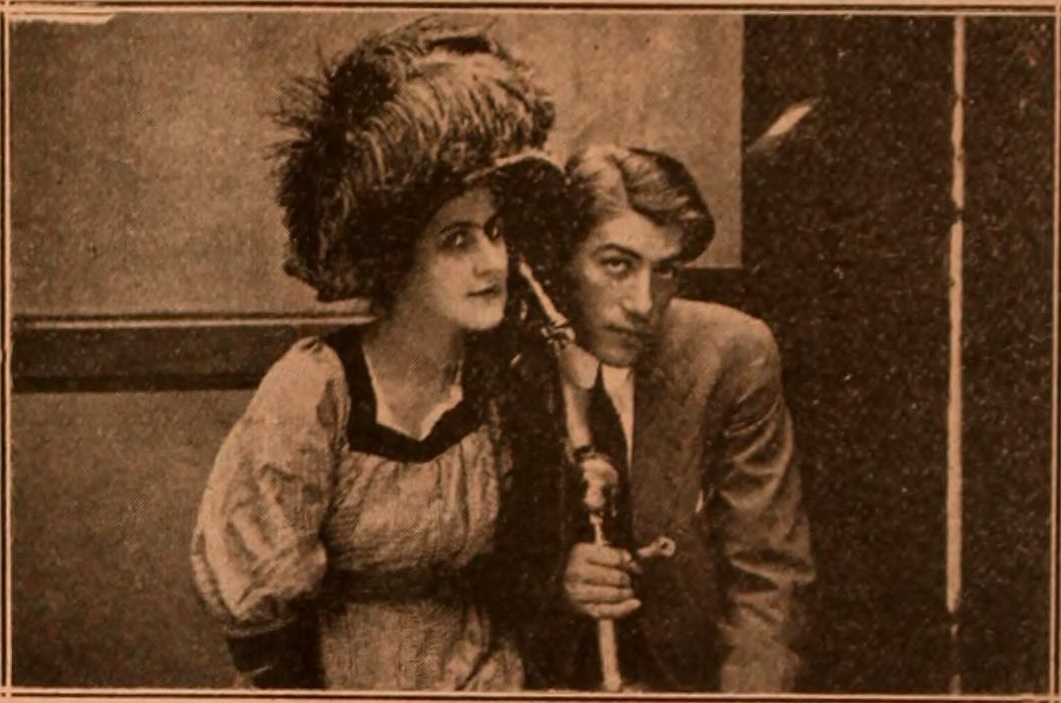
- A surviving film still
- Produced by: Thanhouser Company
- Release date: August 23, 1910
- Country: United States
- Languages: Silent film English inter-titles

A Dainty Politician is a 1910 American silent short drama produced by the Thanhouser Company. The film focuses on corruption political activity during a political convention in which a corrupt politician is running for re-election to the United States Congress. The votes are tallied and the challenger ties with the corrupt Congressman Casey, but a third candidate holds the balance of power. Casey bribes the third candidate to retire in his favor, but the plot is uncovered and the two are ejected from the convention by a reporter who falls in love with challenger's daughter. The film was released on August 23, 1910, and saw a wide national release. Little is known of the actual production, but it received mixed reaction for the plausibility of its plot. The film is presumed lost.

== Plot ==
Though the film is presumed lost, a synopsis survives in The Moving Picture World from August 27, 1910. It states: "Congressman Casey is a type of the ward politician who is now, fortunately, being rapidly eliminated from politics. He is planning his re-election to Congress. The decent movement in the community has been aroused and a movement is on foot to nominate Professor Blake, a citizen of high standing and character. John Willette, a reporter for the Daily Globe, calls on Professor Blake to inform him that he will be requested to run for the nomination and shows an article on the subject that has appeared in the Daily Globe. Professor Blake receives him cordially and he meets Professor Blake's daughter, Marie; the young people proceed to fall in love. The time for the convention arrives. As the convention is assembling and before they proceed to business, a band of suffragettes headed by Miss Croup gain admission and attempt to get a plank introduced in the platform favoring 'votes for women.' The convention turns them down and they are ejected from the floor."

"Nominations are then made for candidates, and after a vote has been taken it is found that ballots for Casey and Professor Blake are very evenly divided in that a candidate named Jennings, who is receiving the fewest votes, holds the balance of power. The convention takes a recess and Casey endeavors to bribe Jennings to retire in his favor and throw all his votes to Casey. Willett overhears enough of the bargain to make him suspicious, and communicates his beliefs to Marie. Between them they contrive to so fix the connection of the telephone in Casey's room that they can overhear the completion of the bribery plot. They succeed in this, and hear Jennings agree to the bargain for the consideration of a large-size check which Casey hands to him. The convention reconvenes, and John Willette appears and makes the charge publicly that Casey has bribed Jennings to throw his votes. Casey and Jennings indignantly deny this, and Marie comes forward as a witness; whereupon Jennings and Casey try to leave the convention. Delegates grab Jennings; search him and find the check given him by Casey. The two are ejected from the convention, which at once nominates Professor Blake and acclaims the two lovers who made the nomination possible."

== Production ==
The writer of the scenario is unknown, but it was most likely Lloyd Lonergan. He was an experienced newspaperman employed by The New York Evening World while writing scripts for the Thanhouser productions. One advertisement claimed, likely in error, that this film was based on the play The Man of the Hour. Written by George Broadhurst, the play focused on political corruption in the form of graft, but the play itself was apparently inspired by politicians of New York. The plot of the film includes a nod to the Women's suffrage movement, but it would be a decade before the Nineteenth Amendment to the United States Constitution prohibited any United States citizen from being denied the right to vote on the basis of sex. The character, Congressman Casey, would later be seen again in Orator, Knight and Cow Charmer. The film director is unknown, but it may have been Barry O'Neil. Film historian Q. David Bowers does not attribute a cameraman for this production, but at least two possible candidates exist. Blair Smith was the first cameraman of the Thanhouser company, but he was soon joined by Carl Louis Gregory who had years of experience as a still and motion picture photographer. The role of the cameraman was uncredited in 1910 productions. There are no known credits for the cast, but Anna Rosemond and Frank H. Crane are two possible actors that were prominent players in 1910. Credits may have included Anna Rosemond, one of two leading ladies of the Thanhouser company in this era. Frank H. Crane was a leading male actor of the company and also involved since the very beginnings of the Thanhouser Company. Bowers states that most of the credits are fragmentary for 1910 Thanhouser productions. A surviving film still leaves open the possibility of identifying two characters.

== Release and reception ==
The one reel drama, approximately 960 feet long, was released on August 23, 1910. The film had a wide national release, theater advertisements are known in Kansas, Missouri, Pennsylvania, Washington, Indiana, New Hampshire, Arizona, Texas, Ohio, and Illinois. One of the last known advertisements for the film was in Bryan, Texas on March 6, 1912.

The film was reviewed positively in The Moving Picture World which stated, "Apparently someone connected with the Thanhouser Company has learned something of ward politics, and the methods of controlling a convention are very clearly and bluntly stated. It isn't always possible to expose plots such as this one was exposed, but it would have been a good thing if it could be done.... The situations are dramatically worked out and the interest never flags from the beginning to the end. A love story adds a certain degree of interest to the picture, and the development of the plot is strengthened by the young people's lovemaking." The New York Dramatic Mirror disagreed with the plausibility of the depicted political manipulation, but found the picture to be interesting and the acting to be adequate. Later publications would also reference the film for its content, like The Columbia Companion to American History on Film which cites it as an example of a political machine based on graft and deceit. Neither graft nor deceit is actually in play with the production, for pure bribery is the method upon which the politician uses to gain political power. Kay Sloan, author of The Loud Silents: Origins of the Social Problem Film, states that the film explored the problem of political corruption and critics approved because they saw was a realistic portrayal. Another release dealing with political corruption was The Girl Reporter, released by Thanhouser on August 16, 1910.

== See also ==
- List of American films of 1910
