= Charles J. Hite =

American film producer

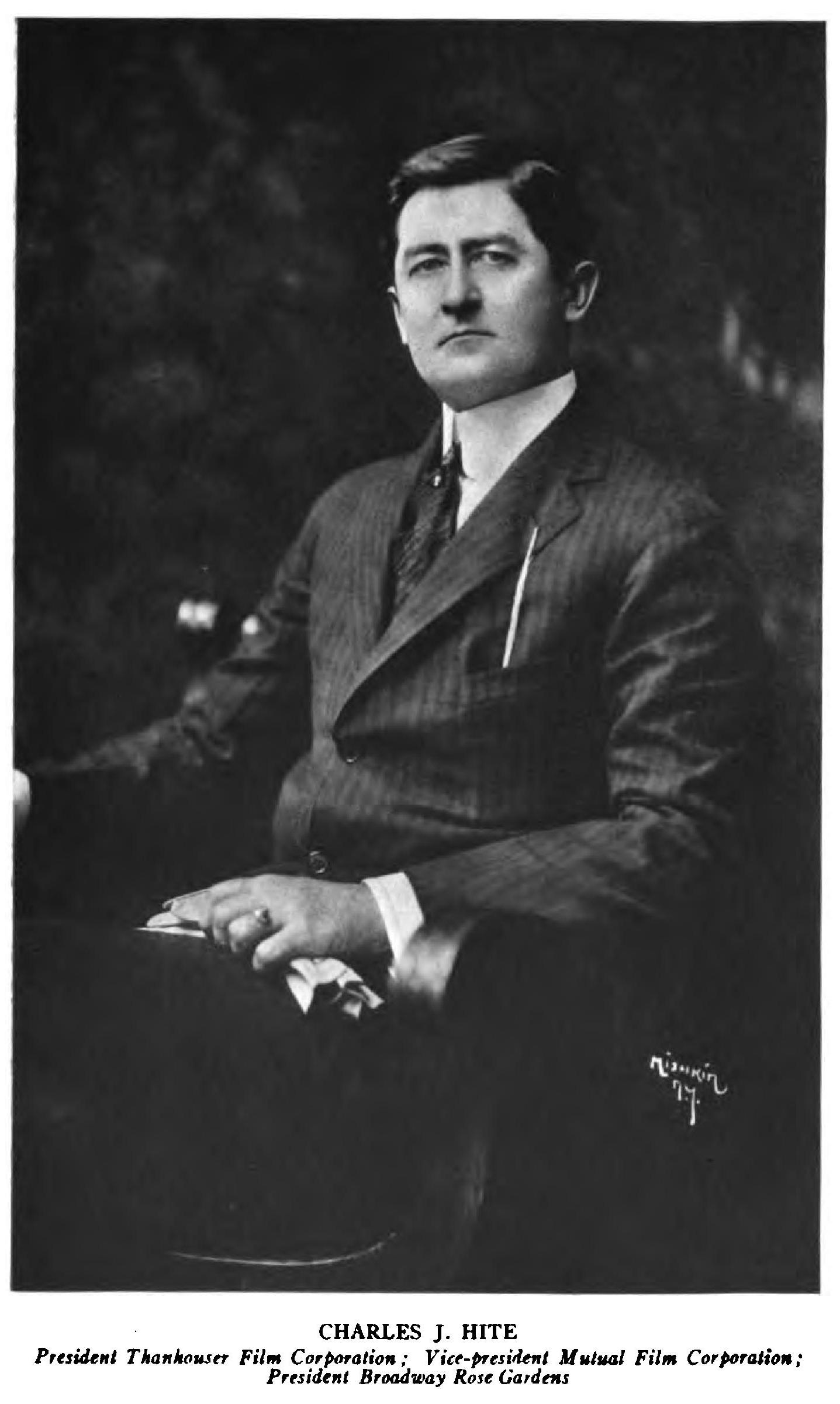
- Born: June 7, 1876; Pleasantville, Ohio, U.S.
- Died: August 21, 1914 (aged 38); Manhattan, New York, U.S.
- Occupations: Film producer · President and CEO Thanhouser Film Corporation

Charles Jackson Hite (June 7, 1876 – August 21, 1914) was an American businessman and film producer of the early 20th century, most importantly the president and chief executive officer of the Thanhouser Film Corporation from 1912 to 1914. Under his leadership, the company achieved success with the serial The Million Dollar Mystery before he died in an automobile accident.

== Early life and career ==
Hite was born in Pleasantville, Ohio, having nine brothers and sisters. His father, Joseph Hite, had moved his family to Ohio from Rockingham County, Virginia prior to Charles Hite's birth. He began working in the motion picture business at an early age, working his way up through the ranks of the business, mostly as an administrator. In 1906, he created the "C. J. Hite Moving Picture Company". His business was less than successful. In 1908 he was joined by S. S. Hutchinson, who later saw success with "American Film Manufacturing Company", which was formed in 1910 with Western Film Exchange owner John Freuler. Hite's company name was then changed to "H & H Film Service Company". By this time he had married his wife, Marjorie, with whom he had two daughters.

== Thanhouser Corporation ==
Hite bought stock in American Film Manufacturing, and afterward purchased the Globe, Royal, and Union film companies, forming the Majestic Film Exchange. When he learned that the successful Thanhouser Company might be for sale, he approached Edwin Thanhouser, and he and his partners purchased that company for $250,000 on April 15, 1912, in a transaction arranged by Mutual Film Corporation. Following the purchase, Hite was named president of the Thanhouser Film Corporation.

Under Hite's leadership, the company saw numerous successes in its films. In 1911, Edwin Thanhouser had obtained actress Florence La Badie, who became Thanhouser Corporation's most profitable film star. In 1914, Hite cast La Badie in the serial The Million Dollar Mystery, which became highly successful. By mid-1914, Hite was listed by Photoplay magazine as one of its twelve featured millionaires. During this period, Thanhouser Film Corporation was at its height.

== Death ==
On August 21, 1914, Hite was on the way to his home in New Rochelle, New York and was crossing the viaduct at 155th Street in Manhattan when his vehicle, for reasons unknown, skidded off the roadway and onto the sidewalk, tore through an iron railing and plunged fifty feet before landing atop a wooden fence. A police officer was standing nearby, and witnessed the crash, running immediately to the scene. The viaduct was located beside the "Central Casino", which was that night hosting a dance. Hearing the accident, several people rushed outside. It took them fifteen minutes to pull Hite from underneath the motor of the vehicle.

Hite was transported to Harlem Hospital, where he regained consciousness, and requested that his wife be notified. He had suffered a fractured skull, a compound fracture to his jaw, and three broken ribs. He died that same night. He was originally buried in Beechwoods Cemetery in New Rochelle, however at the request of his widow his remains were moved to Oakwood Cemetery in Chicago, Illinois, less than a year after his death.
