= Gertrude Thanhouser =

American actress

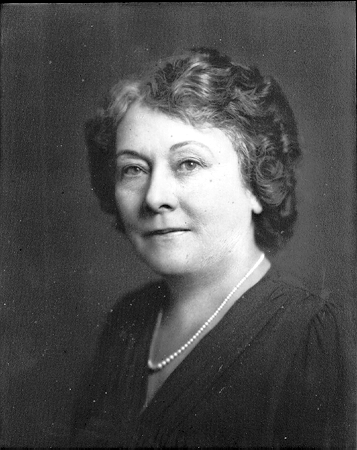
- Born: Gertrude Homan; April 23, 1882; Beauvoir, Mississippi
- Died: May 29, 1951 (aged 69); Long Island, New York
- Years active: 1910–1915
- Spouse: Edwin Thanhouser

Gertrude Homan Thanhouser (April 23, 1882 – May 29, 1951), was an Anerican actress, screenwriter, film editor, and studio executive. The wife of Edwin Thanhouser, she worked at the Thanhouser Company studio. Her efforts made the studio one of the key independent US film studios in the nickelodeon and transitional era, praised for its erudite adaptations of Shakespeare and other "classical" stage dramas to the screen.

== Biography ==
Gertrude Homan was born in 1882 (one family account gives the date as 1880) in Beauvoir, Mississippi, one of 10 children in her family. When she was very young, the family moved to Brooklyn, New York, and she became involved in acting as a child, performing her first stage role at the age of six. As a child actress, her theatrical parts included title roles in Little Lord Fauntleroy and Editha's Burglar. In the 1890s she was part of a stock company in Milwaukee that was managed by Edwin Thanhouser, whom she married in 1900.

In the spring of 1909, Gertrude moved with her husband to New Rochelle, New York where they established Thanhouser Company as an independent motion picture studio; it was the first to be organized by leaders with strong theatrical training. Gertrude's acting career of fourteen years gave her the stagecraft to be a powerful and creative force in this new venture. She received co-scenario writing credit with brother-in-law, Lloyd Lonergan, for the screen adaptation of Shakespeare's The Winter's Tale. Behind the scenes, Gertrude was heavily involved in scenario development, creation of mise en scène and film editing. In 1912, the Thanhousers sold their shares in the company to Charles J. Hite of Mutual Film Corporation for $250,000 and retired from the industry.

In August 1914, Hite was killed in an automobile accident. In February 1915, the Mutual board of directors in an extraordinary move lured Edwin and Gertrude out of retirement. Gertrude immediately resumed her role as supervisor of the scenario department and was credited for writing the scenario for their first "new" release, Their One Love. She remained active in company affairs including attending a meeting with President Woodrow Wilson in 1916. In the summer of 1916 the death of Thanhouser leading actress Florence LaBadie and the rise of feature films with stars such as Mary Pickford contributed to the decline in popularity of the studio's films. In 1918, the founders retired permanently from the film industry leaving the Thanhouser Film Corporation with a positive bank balance, unlike many others of the era.
