= Edwin Thanhouser =

American actor

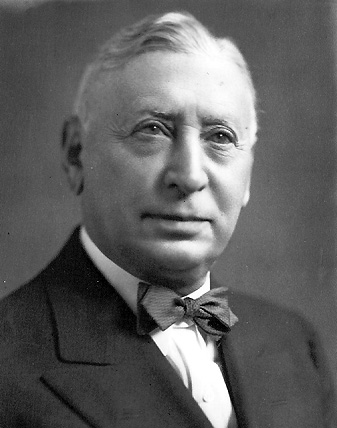
- Born: November 11, 1865; Baltimore, Maryland
- Died: March 21, 1956 (aged 90); New York City
- Years active: 1910–1917
- Spouse: Gertrude Thanhouser

Edwin Thanhouser (November 11, 1865 – March 21, 1956) was an American actor, businessman, and film producer. He was most notable as a founder of the Thanhouser Company, which was one of the first motion picture studios. His wife Gertrude Thanhouser and brother-in-law Lloyd Lonergan were co-founders.

== Biography ==
Thanhouser was born in Baltimore, Maryland. In 1893, he joined the traveling company of Alessandro Salvini. After Salvini's unexpected death in 1896, Thanhouser managed the Academy Theater in Milwaukee, Wisconsin, for the Shubert family and then the Bush Temple Theater in Chicago, Illinois. He formed a stock company that put on hundreds of theatrical productions.

On February 8, 1900, Thanhouser married actress Gertrude Homan.

In 1909, Thanhouser and his family moved to New Rochelle, New York, where he leased space in an old wooden skating rink to start the Thanhouser Company. This pioneering movie studio released its first commercial film on March 15, 1910.

Thanhouser brought actress Florence La Badie to the company in 1911. From 1911 to 1917, she was the company's most prominent star. In 1912, he sold the film company to group headed by Charles J. Hite. Early in 1915, after Hite's death in an accident, Thanhouser took charge of the company again, but was not as successful as he had been before. The Thanhouser Film Corporation was liquidated in 1920.

Edwin Thanhouser engaged in securities investments and collected art in his later years. He died March 21, 1956.
