= Barry O'Neil =

American film director and screenwriter

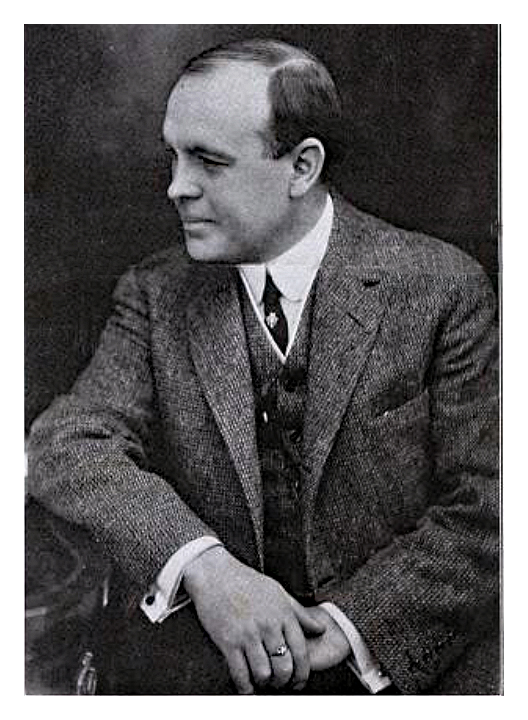
- Portrait of Barry O'Neil 1914
- Born: Thomas J. McCarthy; September 24, 1865; New York City, U.S.
- Died: March 23, 1918 (aged 52); New York City, U.S.
- Occupations: film director; screenwriter

Barry O'Neil (1865 – 1918) was a film director and writer. His real name was Thomas J. McCarthy. He directed several Thanhouser films including the production company's first two-reeler, Romeo and Juliet. He went on to work for Lubin and then World Film Corporation.

He was born in New York City.

O'Neil married actress Nellie Walters. In 1913 O'Neil was elected to The Lambs as a non-resident member. He died of apoplexy.

In 1910 and 1911 he filmed adaptations of a couple William Shakespeare plays. In 1915 he filmed a version of McTeague in Death Valley released as Life's Whirlpool. William E. Hamilton was an assistant director to O'Neil.

== Filmography ==
=== Director ===
- The Actor's Children (1910)
- The Mad Hermit (1910)
- Uncle Tom's Cabin
- The Writing on the Wall (1910)
- The Girl of the Northern Woods (1910)
- The Winter's Tale (1910)
- St. Elmo (1910)
- The Actor's Children (1910)
- Romeo and Juliet (1911)
- The Old Curiosity Shop (1911)
- For the Love of a Girl (1912)
- When the Earth Trembled (1913)
- The Third Degree (1913)
- The Wolf (1914)
- The Evangelist (1916), adapted from the 1907 play
- Bought (1915)
- The Great Ruby (1915)
- McTeague, also known as Life's Whirlpool (1916)
- A Woman's Way (1916)
- Husband and Wife (1916)
- The Evangelist (1916)
- The Unpardonable Sin
- The Weakness of Man
- The Revolt
- Hidden Scar

=== Writer ===
- The Third Degree (1913)
- The Lion and the Mouse (1914)
- McTeague, also known as Life's Whirlpool (1916)
