= Thanhouser Company =

Early motion picture studio

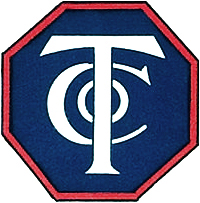
- Logo of the Thanhouser Company
- Founded: 1909, New Rochelle, New York
- Founder: Edwin Thanhouser, Gertrude Thanhouser, Lloyd Lonergan
- Defunct: 1920
- Fate: Absorbed into First National Attraction
- Products: Film
- Website: thanhouser.org

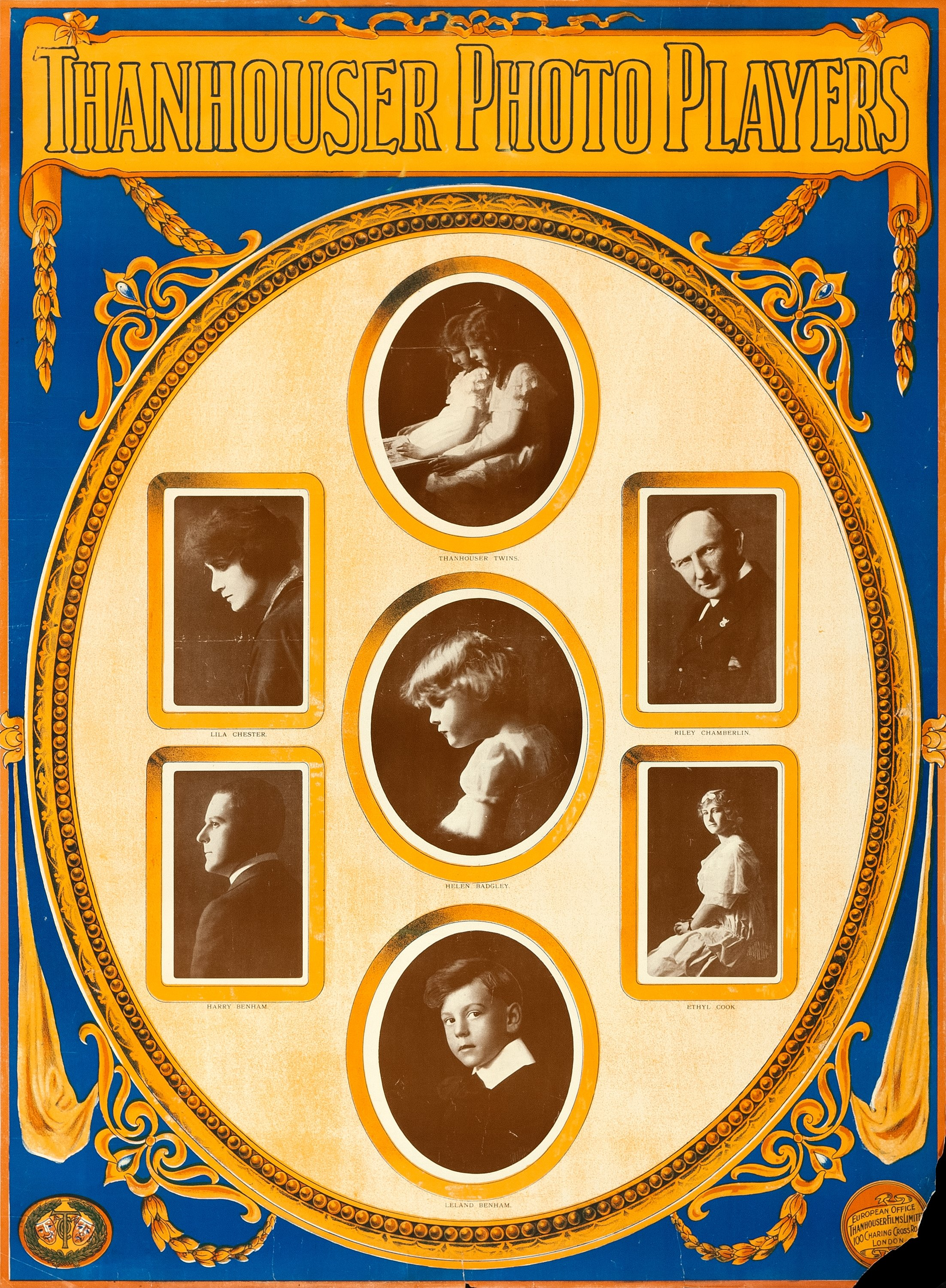
British One Sheet, 1910s

The Thanhouser Company (later the Thanhouser Film Corporation) was one of the first motion picture studios, founded in 1909 by Edwin Thanhouser, his wife Gertrude and his brother-in-law Lloyd Lonergan. It operated in New York City until 1920, producing over a thousand films.

== Corporate history ==
Edwin Thanhouser constructed a studio in New Rochelle, New York. The company thrived under his leadership and by the summer of 1910, it had established itself as the best of the independents in the industry. Frank E. Woods of the American Biograph Company would pen an editorial in The New York Dramatic Mirror as "The Spectator", praising the Thanhouser company to this effect.

It was sold to Mutual Film Corporation on April 15, 1912, for $250,000. Charles J. Hite took charge.

On January 13, 1913, a fire destroyed the main facility in New Rochelle; much equipment and many costumes and negatives of films in production were lost. However, subsidiary studios that had been set up were able to meet distributors' needs while it was being rebuilt.

After Hite's death in an automobile accident, the company continued for another five years. After a period of floundering under inexperienced leadership, Edwin Thanhouser was hired to take charge, but he could not recreate the success of his earlier years. The film industry had evolved and was more competitive by this time, and although films featuring star Florence La Badie were still successful, other ventures were not. La Badie left Thanhouser Corporation in 1917, only weeks before her own death on October 13, 1917, due to injuries sustained in an automobile accident in late August. In 1920, Thanhouser Corporation was liquidated.

== Releases of 1910 ==
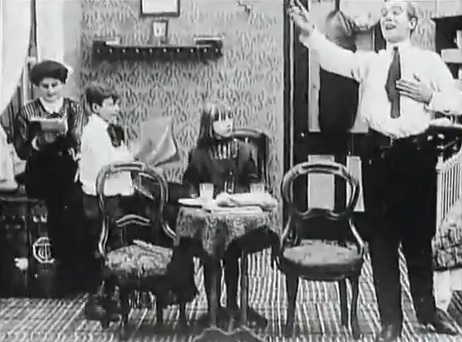
A still from The Actor's Children. It shows the family with the father doing some theatrical acting for the amusement of his children.

The Thanhouser Company's first release was The Actor's Children on March 15, 1910. The plot focused on a family of theater actors who struggle to pay the rent. While the parents are out, their kids are left out on the street where they dance to the music of an organ grinder. They are later rescued by a theater manager and are reunited with their parents at the theater. The film's conclusion is an example of the deus ex machina dramatic technique, which Lonergan used to conclude many scenarios. Though it was the first release, it was not the first film to be produced; the first film produced was The Mad Hermit. Produced in the autumn of 1909, The Mad Hermit would not be released until August 1910. According to Lloyd Lonergan, the first script he wrote was for Aunt Nancy Telegraphs, which was shot in December 1909 but never released.

The next release would be an adaptation of Augusta Jane Evans's novel St. Elmo. The Thanhouser version of St. Elmo would bring the company some recognition and would prove to be a success, but the film is also presumed lost. Thanhouser would release two more original scenarios, She's Done it Again and Daddy's Double, before attempting two productions on the same reel. Released on April 15, 1910, A 29-Cent Robbery was included with The Old Shoe Came Back, a short comedy filler subject. The main subject, A 29-Cent Robbery, was the debut of Marie Eline, soon to be famously known as the "Thanhouser Kid". Two more split reels would follow before the release of Jane Eyre. Productions adapted from novels included Shakespeare's The Winter's Tale, Marie Corelli's Thelma and Mary Jane Holmes's Tempest and Sunshine.

More adaptations of classic works, like Uncle Tom's Cabin, would be interspersed with several original scenarios like The Mermaid and The Restoration. On August 9, The Mad Hermit was released and Edwin Thanhouser's fears of it being an amateur production were unfounded. Films in the autumn included novel plots like Dots and Dashes, where Morse code facilitates a man's escape from a safe. As Halloween approached, the company released The Fairies' Hallowe'en, a trick film geared towards child audiences. A Thanksgiving Surprise would also be released in time for Thanksgiving.

The winter of 1910 saw more adaptations of classics and short stories, including Paul and Virginia, John Halifax, Gentleman, Rip Van Winkle and The Vicar of Wakefield. Love and Law was released on December 17, it was to be the first of four films in the "Violet Gray, Detective" series though it was originally billed as part of the "Thanhouser Detective Series". Previously Thanhouser had released another film about a woman reporter who uncovered a political corruption in The Girl Reporter and a young woman who does the same in A Dainty Politician. Thanhouser would also release Looking Forward, an adaptation of James Oliver Curwood's story, where a young chemist awakes a century later to a world run by women. The last release of the year was Hypnotized, focusing on a traveling show with an ill-intentioned hypnotist.

== Filmography ==
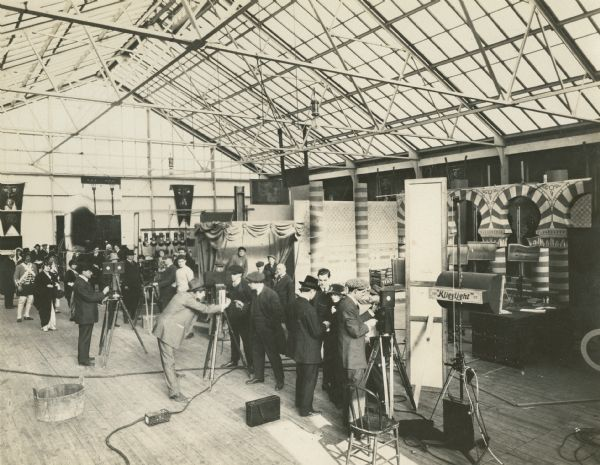
Multiple silent-film scenes being simultaneously filmed under the glass roof of the Thanhouser studio, c. 1914. Visible are actors in costume, directors, cameramen, sets, a Klieg light, and four Pathé silent film cameras

Thanhouser produced over 1,000 silent films. Among these were:

- The Cry of the Children: Selected in 2011 by the National Film Preservation Board of the Library of Congress for inclusion in the National Film Registry, which recognizes films for their cultural, historical and aesthetic significance. The Film Preservation Board described this two-reel melodrama from 1912, part of which was filmed in a working textile mill, as a "key work" in relation to the U.S. movement for child labor reform in the years before World War I. According to the Film Preservation Board, an "influential critic of the time" called it "the boldest, most timely and most effective appeal for the stamping out of the cruelest of all social abuses."
- The Evidence of the Film: A 15-minute film from 1913, among the 25 films selected for the National Film Registry in 2001
- When the Studio Burned: On January 13, 1913 (three days after the release of The Evidence of the Film), the main facility of the Thanhouser studio in New Rochelle, New York burned to the ground. Most of the negatives in the studio's film library were saved. However, in the scramble to save lives, business files and the film library, none of the company's cameramen were able to set up their equipment until after the studio was a smoldering ruin. Thanks to Thanhouser's recent acquisitions of production facilities in Los Angeles and Chicago, the studio was able to produce this 14-minute fictional film about the fire. The film, which included many of the studio's stars appearing as themselves recreating their escape from the fire, was released on February 4, 1913.
