= List of Thanhouser films released in 1910 =

The Thanhouser Company is credited as having released 82 films in 1910. Of these films several are of unknown or questionable status. Roosevelt's Return may not have been shot or released and Alaska's Adieu to Winter is unlikely to have been filmed by the company.

== Releases ==
Title	Release (Note: All release dates are covered by Thanhouser Filmography database without exception.)	Notes	Status (Note: A film is listed as lost if not in the Thanhouser Film Database.)
The Actor's Children	March 15, 1910	The first release of the company, but not the first production.	Extant
St. Elmo	March 22, 1910	Adaptation of Augusta Jane Evans' novel of the same name.	Lost
She's Done It Again	March 29, 1910		Lost
Daddy's Double	April 5, 1910		Extant
A 29-Cent Robbery	April 15, 1910	Split reel. Debut of Marie Eline	Lost
The Old Shoe Came Back	April 15, 1910	Split reel.	Lost
Her Battle For Existence	April 22, 1910	Split reel.	Lost
Sand Man’s Cure	April 22, 1910	Split reel.	Lost
She Wanted To Marry A Hero	April 29, 1910	Split reel.	Lost
The Cigars His Wife Bought	April 29, 1910	Split reel.	Lost
Jane Eyre	May 6, 1910	Adaptation of Charlotte Brontë's novel of the same name	Lost
The Best Man Wins	May 13, 1910		Lost
Cupid At The Circus	May 20, 1910	Features Barnum & Bailey Circus	Lost
The Winter's Tale	May 27, 1910	Adaptation of Shakespeare's play of the same name	Extant
The Girl Of The Northern Woods	June 3, 1910		Extant
The Two Roses	June 7, 1910	Marie Eline plays the role of an Italian boy, first of many male roles.	Extant
The Writing On The Wall	June 10, 1910		Lost
The Woman Hater	June 14, 1910		Lost
The Little Hero Of Holland	June 17, 1910	Based on the story. Marie Eline in a male role.	Lost
Roosevelt's Return	June 18, 1910	Possibly never shot or released.	Unknown
Thelma	June 21, 1910	Adapted from Marie Corelli's novel of the same name	Extant
The Governor's Daughter	June 24, 1910		Lost
Tempest And Sunshine	June 28, 1910	Adapted from Mary Jane Holmes' novel of the same name	Lost
The Flag Of His Country	July 1, 1910	A patriotic picture.	Lost
Gone To Coney Island	July 5, 1910	Featuring Coney Island	Lost
Booming Business	July 5, 1910	Reviewed as a slapstick comedy, a type of comedy Edwin Thanhouser said the company would not release.	Lost
The Girl Strike Leader	July 8, 1910	Focuses on a female strike leader.	Lost
The Lucky Shot	July 12, 1910		Lost
The Converted Deacon	July 15, 1910		Lost
The Girls Of The Ghetto	July 19, 1910		Lost
The Playwright's Love	July 22, 1910	Bares some similarities to The Prince Chap.	Lost
Uncle Tom's Cabin	July 26, 1910	Adaptation of Harriet Beecher Stowe's novel of the same name.	Lost
The Mermaid	July 29, 1910		Lost
The Jenks' Day Off	August 2, 1910		Lost
The Restoration	August 5, 1910		Lost
The Mad Hermit	August 9, 1910	Shot in the autumn of 1909.	Lost
Lena Rivers	August 12, 1910	Adaptation of Mary Jane Holmes' novel of the same name.	Lost
The Girl Reporter	August 16, 1910		Lost
She Stoops To Conquer	August 19, 1910	Adaptation of Oliver Goldsmith's She Stoops to Conquer	Lost
A Dainty Politician	August 23, 1910		Lost
The Latchkey	August 26, 1910		Lost
An Assisted Elopement	August 30, 1910		Lost
A Fresh Start	September 2, 1910		Lost
Mother	September 6, 1910		Lost
The Doctor's Carriage	September 9, 1910		Lost
Tangled Lives	September 13, 1910		Lost
The Stolen Invention	September 16, 1910		Lost
Not Guilty	September 20, 1910		Extant
The Convict	September 23, 1910	Split reel.	Lost
The Hero's Jealous Wife	September 23, 1910	Split reel.	Lost
Home Made Mince Pie	September 27, 1910		Lost
Dots And Dashes	September 30, 1910		Lost
Leon Of The Table D'hote	October 4, 1910		Lost
Avenged	October 7, 1910		Lost
Pocahontas	October 11, 1910	Based on Lydia Sigourney's Pocahontas poem	Lost
Delightful Dolly	October 14, 1910		Lost
Oh, What A Knight!	October 18, 1910		Lost
Alaska's Adieu To Winter	October 20, 1910	Unlikely to have been filmed by the Thanhouser crew. No United States release. Release date applies to British release.	Lost
Their Child	October 21, 1910		Lost
Young Lord Stanley	October 25, 1910		Extant
The Life Of A Fireman	October 27, 1910		Lost
Parade Of The Volunteer Firemen Of Westchester County And Vicinity	October 27, 1910		Lost
The Fairies' Hallowe'en	October 28, 1910	A seasonal and trick film.	Lost
Mistress And Maid	November 1, 1910		Lost
Ten Nights In A Bar Room	November 4, 1910	Adapted from Timothy Shay Arthur's novel of the same name.	Lost
The Little Fire Chief	November 8, 1910		Lost
The American And The Queen	November 11, 1910	A patriotic picture	Lost
Paul And Virginia	November 15, 1910	Adapted from Jacques-Henri Bernardin de Saint-Pierre 's novel Paul et Virginie	Lost
The City Of Her Dreams	November 18, 1910		Lost
A Thanksgiving Surprise	November 22, 1910	A seasonal film.	Lost
The Wild Flower And The Rose	November 25, 1910		Lost
Value—Beyond Price	November 29, 1910		Extant
John Halifax, Gentleman	December 2, 1910	Adapted from Dinah Maria Mulock Craik's novel of the same name.	Lost
Rip Van Winkle	December 6, 1910	Based on Washington Irving's short story of the same name.	Lost
The Girls He Left Behind Him	December 9, 1910		Lost
The Iron Clad Lover	December 9, 1910		Lost
Love And Law	December 13, 1910	First in a four-part film series.	Lost
The Millionaire Milkman	December 16, 1910		Lost
Looking Forward	December 20, 1910	Based on James Oliver Curwood's short story of the same name.	Lost
The Childhood Of Jack Harkaway	December 23, 1910	Based on S. Bracebridge Hemyng's Jack Harkaway serializations	Extant
The Vicar Of Wakefield	December 27, 1910	Adapted from Oliver Goldsmith's novel of the same name.	Extant
Hypnotized	December 30, 1910		Lost
