= The Girls He Left Behind Him and The Iron Clad Lover =

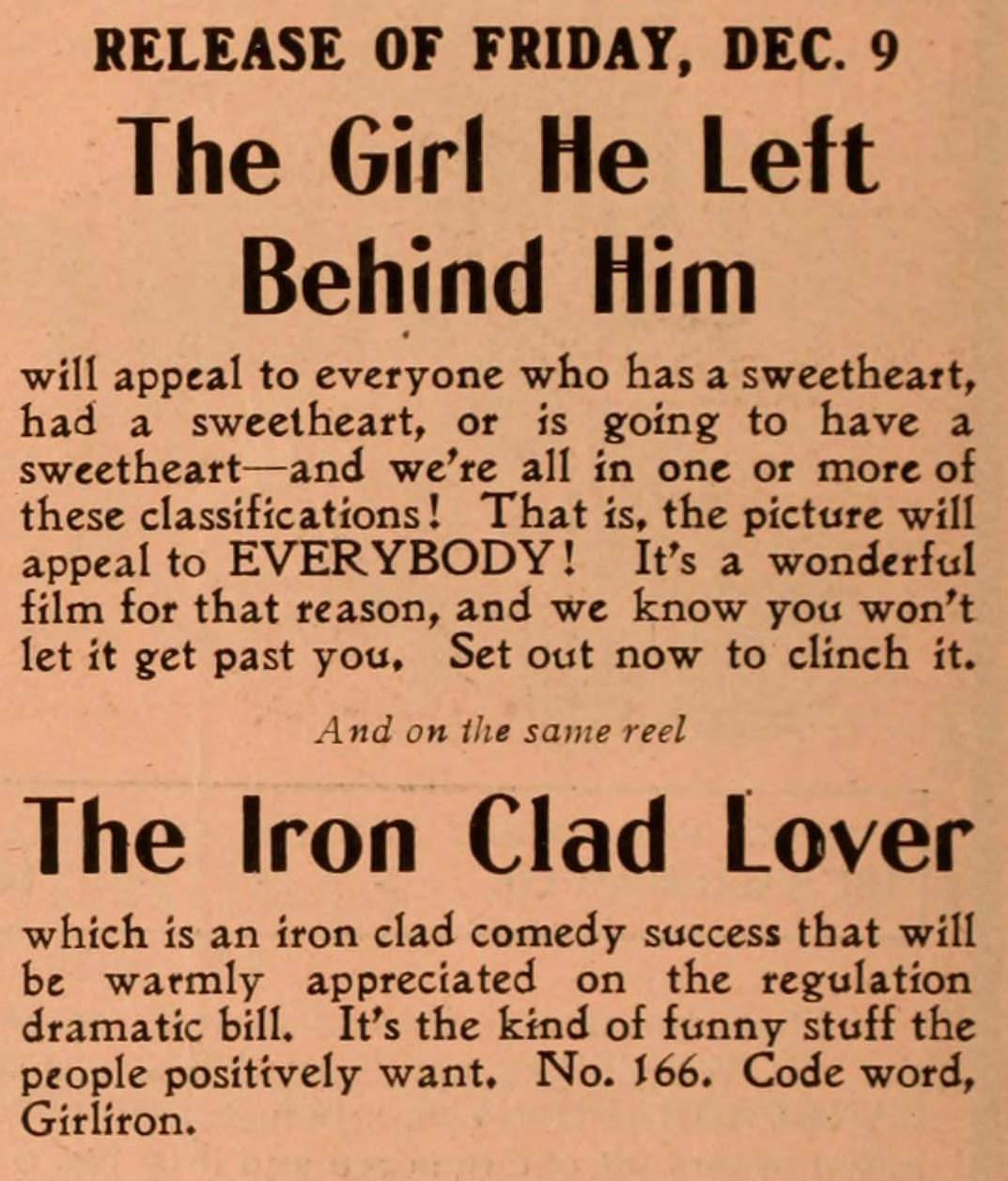
- Thanhouser advertisement for the film which misspelled the first film's title. (Note: The film title is The Girls He Left Behind Him, not The Girl He Left Behind Him. This misspelling was not reflected in reviews and was corrected in film listings.)
- Produced by: Thanhouser Company
- Distributed by: Motion Picture Distributing and Sales Company
- Release date: December 9, 1910
- Country: United States
- Languages: Silent film English intertitles

The Girls He Left Behind Him and The Iron Clad Lover are two 1910 American silent short comedies produced by the Thanhouser Company. Both films were originally released together on a single reel and are two distinct and separate subjects. The Girls He Left Behind Him focuses on a young man, Jack Redfern, who receives a letter from an old sweetheart of his. This prompts him to reminiscence about all the girls he has had affections for on the eve of his wedding. All the old sweethearts of his life then appear at his wedding to wish him well. The Iron Clad Lover concerns two suitors who are vying for the affections of Bessie. Tom, who plays a game of chess with her father, ends up quarreling with him and he is thrown out of the house. The next day, Tom attempts to bring flowers and candy for Bessie's birthday, but is dismissed by the angry father. Tom decides to dress up in a suit of armor and ends up breaking a vase when trying to announce himself. The suit of armor is thrown out and Bessie and the other suitor chase down the junk dealer to free Tom from the suit of armor. Both films were released on December 9, 1910, and were met with positive reviews by The Moving Picture World and the New York Dramatic Mirror. Both films are presumed lost.

== Plot ==
Though the films are presumed lost, the synopsis of both films survive in The Moving Picture World from December 10, 1910. The plot of The Girls He Left Behind Him follows Jack Redfern, a young bachelor, who is soon to be married. Jack receives a letter in feminine handwriting from an "old sweetheart" of his, stating how glad she is to hear of his approaching marriage. Jack goes through visions, remembering the various girls of his life and his interactions with each of them. Betty, Kate, Tootsie, Elizabeth, Clara, Jeanette, and Helen. According to the synopsis, the last vision he has is of all the old sweethearts of his waving good luck to him as he marries Mary. Though a review states that he awakes and is obliged to hurry to his wedding. Bowers believes the synopsis to be in error and that the film actually concluded with all the girls present at the wedding, rather than it being a "vision".

For the Iron Clad Lover: "Dick makes love to Bessie while Tom plays a game of chess with her father. Tom, naturally nervous, plays such a poor game that he and the old man quarrel and Tom is ordered from the house. Next day is Bessie's birthday. Tom brings a bouquet and a box of candy. But he is turned away from the house and has the gifts thrown at his head by Bessie's father. Dick arrives and is welcomed. Tom, in desperation, buys a suit of armor, puts it on and has himself delivered to the house as a present to Bessie. Dick finds out that Tom is inside the armor and makes life miserable for him, blowing cigar smoke through the visor and making love to Bessie. Tom, unable to stand this, tries to announce himself, but only succeeds in stumbling over and breaking a valuable vase. Bessie's pa has the 'armor' thrown out. Dick's conscience makes him tell Bessie that Tom was in the armor, and they started the rescue. They were horrified to learn that the old man has sold the armor to a junk dealer; and Dick and Bessie have an exciting chase before the junk man is rounded up, when it takes combined efforts of a policeman, locksmith, and plumber to release Tom from his iron suit."

== Production ==
The writer of the scenarios are unknown, but it was most likely Lloyd Lonergan. He was an experienced newspaperman employed by The New York Evening World while writing scripts for the Thanhouser productions. The film directors are unknown, but it may have been Barry O'Neil and/or Lucius J. Henderson. Cameramen employed by the company during this era included Blair Smith, Carl Louis Gregory, and Alfred H. Moses, Jr. though none are specifically credited. The role of the cameraman was uncredited in 1910 productions. The cast credits of both films are unknown, but many 1910 Thanhouser productions are fragmentary. In late 1910, the Thanhouser company released a list of the important personalities in their films. The list includes G.W. Abbe, Justus D. Barnes, Frank H. Crane, Irene Crane, Marie Eline, Violet Heming, Martin J. Faust, Thomas Fortune, George Middleton, Grace Moore, John W. Noble, Anna Rosemond, Mrs. George Walters.

== Release and reception ==
The Girls He Left Behind Him and The Iron Clad Lover were released together on a single reel, approximately 1,000 feet in length, on December 9, 1910. Both films are comedies, but Thanhouser advertisements refer to The Girls He Left Behind Him as a drama. The individual lengths of the reels are not known for certain, but the Thanhouser Company Film Preservation lists The Girls He Left Behind Him as being three-quarters of a reel and The Iron Clad Lover as half a reel in length. This is listed as an approximation of the relative expected lengths of the production, which could have been about 625 feet and 400 feet in length and still be a single reel. Very few advertisements for the films have been found, but the films likely had a wide national release. One advertisement featuring both films was found in Missouri, but The Girls He Left Behind Him was advertised without its other half and with slightly different spellings in Wisconsin and another Missouri theater. (Note: Misspellings were common for films with titles of this length and nature. Some newspapers would also misspell the Thanhouser company as "Tannhauser".) Selig would release a similarly titled work The Girl He Left Behind in 1912.

The Girls He Left Behind Him received praise from the reviewer from The Moving Picture World who stated, "[It is a] comedy, not by any means original, but with a sentimental touch, ... this excellent film has placed in visible form these visions of the past which often haunt the middle aged or the younger person who about to take some important step. The mechanical work is well done and the audience follows the picture with interest." The New York Dramatic Mirror also gave it faint praise by stating that "The picture has some novelty and interest." For The Iron Clad Lover received minor praise from both publications for being a novel even if the story was impossible.

== See also ==
- List of American films of 1910
