= Their Child =

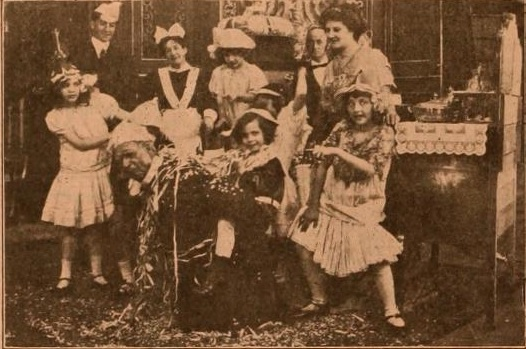
- A surviving film still
- Produced by: Thanhouser Company
- Distributed by: Motion Picture Distributing and Sales Company
- Release date: October 21, 1910
- Country: United States
- Languages: Silent film English inter-titles

Their Child is a 1910 American silent short drama produced by the Thanhouser Company. The film begins with Ellen Stokes whose extravagant lifestyle is outside the means of the family. While their only son is hosting a birthday party, the husband informs Ellen that they are financially ruined because of her. Ellen attempts to get money from her uncle, who refuses, and a friend of the family soon comes to her aid with a loan. Ellen is deceptive in telling who provided the money and her jealous husband soon learns the truth. In anger, he takes the child and leaves. The child soon returns to Ellen and she whisks him away to a new home where she fails to obtain gainful employment. The son decides to sell newspapers for some money and in this job is recognized by his father, soon the family is reunited. Marie Eline played the role of "their child" and was likely so well disguised that the reviewer for The Nickelodeon believed her to be a boy. The film was released on October 21, 1910, and was met with positive reviews. The film is presumed lost.

== Plot ==
Though the film is presumed lost, a synopsis survives in The Moving Picture World from October 22, 1910. It states: "Ellen Stokes is a loving wife and mother, but she has one fault - extravagance. On the day that her only child is playing the host at a birthday party, Ellen's husband informs her that he is practically ruined, and places the fault at her door. Ellen, conscience stricken, declares that she will aid her husband, and tells him that she will induce her rich uncle to aid them. When she talks to him on the subject, she finds that he is not disposed to aid her. Soon after his refusal, a friend of the family drops in, finds Ellen in tears, learns of her trouble, and offers a loan which she finally accepts. The woman's husband is of a jealous nature and when Ellen gives him the money, he asks if it came from the other man. She hastily denies it, and says that her uncle was the one. The husband takes the money, and later finds that his wife has deceived him. In anger he leaves the house, taking their only child with him."

"When Ellen finds that she has been deserted, she listens to the pleadings of the other man and is about to elope with him, when the baby, Tom, unexpectedly appears. He has run away from his father, and trudged through the streets, alone, to rejoin his mother. The woman clasped her child in her arms and decides to live for him in the future. The mother takes her child to humble lodgings, the whereabouts of which are unknown even to her husband. There she tries to make a living for herself and him by sewing, but is unable to do so. She has given the last crust of bread to the little one, and is herself in a starving condition, when the baby boy himself comes to the rescue by starting out on a business career, selling papers in the street. In this way the wolf is kept from the door for a little while longer, and the little fellow, while applying his trade on the street corner, is met and recognized by his father. With his son as his guide, the repentant husband, who now realizes his unjust action, goes to his wife, and with the baby as a mediator, the two become reconciled."

== Production ==
The writer of the scenario is unknown, but it was most likely Lloyd Lonergan. He was an experienced newspaperman employed by The New York Evening World while writing scripts for the Thanhouser productions. The film director is unknown, but it may have been Barry O'Neil. Film historian Q. David Bowers does not attribute a cameraman for this production, but at least two possible candidates exist. Blair Smith was the first cameraman of the Thanhouser company, but he was soon joined by Carl Louis Gregory who had years of experience as a still and motion picture photographer. The role of the cameraman was uncredited in 1910 productions. The only known credit is for Marie Eline in the role of "their child". The other cast credits are unknown, but many 1910 Thanhouser productions are fragmentary. In late 1910, the Thanhouser company released a list of the important personalities in their films. The list includes G.W. Abbe, Justus D. Barnes, Frank H. Crane, Irene Crane, Marie Eline, Violet Heming, Martin J. Faust, Thomas Fortune, George Middleton, Grace Moore, John W. Noble, Anna Rosemond, Mrs. George Walters. A surviving film still gives the possibility of identifying most of the actors in the film.

It seems that Marie Eline was so well-disguised as a boy that the reviewer for The Nickelodeon was unable to recognize her true gender. The reviewer state "the meeting between the father and his newsboy child also has a touch of originality" and "[t]he child is a fine little actor, easily making himself the star of the piece." Though this was not lost on the reviewer for The New York Dramatic Mirror which stated, "The work of the little girl who plays the leading role in this film is a constant wonder to spectators." Eline had proven herself capable of handling male characters, with the first such credit as a young Italian boy in The Two Roses. Eline would also star as Hans in The Little Hero of Holland.

== Release and reception ==
The single reel drama, approximately 1,000 feet long, was released on October 21, 1910. The film had a wide national release, with theaters showing the film in Maryland, Pennsylvania, South Dakota, Indiana, and Kansas. In 1917, years after its release, it was later approved by the Pennsylvania State Board of Censors of Moving Pictures for viewing without modification.

The film was reviewed positively by the trade publications. The Moving Picture World stated, "The dramatic qualities of this film are high, but the subject is somewhat depressing... Maybe the picture will teach the lesson that it is better to listen to explanations at first and save all those intervening years of sorrow and suffering. It ought to, at any rate, because that story is plainly wrought out and is apparent as it is possible to make it." A review in The Nickelodeon offered little more than a summary of the film, but the reviewer found the subject to be enhanced by the attention to detail in the production. The reviewer was also pleased that the child was not brought in to serve as in deus ex machina role. Though Lonergan was fond of using the technique. Even The New York Dramatic Mirror gave some praise to the production, but noted that the acting of the mother's friend was the weakest because "[a] man of his [caliber] wouldn't have backed off so quickly." Overall, the reviewer found the acting to be better than the narrative itself and concluded that "[s]omething less laboredly sentimental would be much stronger."

== See also ==
- List of American films of 1910
