= The City of Her Dreams =

- Produced by: Thanhouser Company
- Distributed by: Motion Picture Distributing and Sales Company
- Release date: November 18, 1910
- Country: United States
- Languages: Silent film English intertitles

The City of Her Dreams is a 1910 American silent short drama produced by the Thanhouser Company. The film focuses on Ella Brown, who is sent to live with her aunt who living in a boarding house when her father heads to Alaska to prospect for gold. Ella's life at her aunt's home is miserable and she dreams of going to New York City. She dreams that she is in the city and has all money to buy anything which she fancies. Then she receives word that her father has returned from Alaska with a fortune and wants to give her everything she wants. The cast and staff credits are unknown, but the film includes scenes of New York City. The film was released on November 18, 1910, and saw a wide national release. The film is presumed lost.

== Plot ==
Though the film is presumed lost, a synopsis survives in The Moving Picture World from November 19, 1910. It states: "Ella Brown is the only child of a poor widower. Their home is in a small town in the Middle West, and Ella has never seen New York (City), although she has always wanted to go there. Her father, finding times hard, decides to take a chance in the gold fields of Alaska, and when the play opens, is about to start there. He leaves Ella in the care of an aunt, a sour old person who runs a boarding house, who promptly makes a drudge out of the girl. As she has no other relatives, there is nothing for her to do except submit. Sitting in her room one evening, tired after a day's hard work, she looks at her two treasured magazines, one showing views of her pet city and the other giving the latest fashion. The girl is filled with a longing to travel and wear pretty clothes, and falls asleep. In her dream she is transported to New York, where she finds enough money to enable her to buy all the pretty things she admires. Ella greatly enjoys her visit, and is extremely unhappy when she wakes up. But she finds that her dream will become reality before long, for her father has returned from the gold fields with a fortune and a desire to fulfill all the wishes of his pretty daughter."

== Production ==
The writer of the scenario is unknown, but it was most likely Lloyd Lonergan. He was an experienced newspaperman employed by The New York Evening World while writing scripts for the Thanhouser productions. The film director is unknown, but it may have been Barry O'Neil or Lucius J. Henderson. Cameramen employed by the company during this era included Blair Smith, Carl Louis Gregory, and Alfred H. Moses, Jr. though none are specifically credited. The role of the cameraman was uncredited in 1910 productions. The cast credits are unknown, but many 1910 Thanhouser productions are fragmentary. In late 1910, the Thanhouser company released a list of the important personalities in their films. The list includes G.W. Abbe, Justus D. Barnes, Frank H. Crane, Irene Crane, Marie Eline, Violet Heming, Martin J. Faust, Thomas Fortune, George Middleton, Grace Moore, John W. Noble, Anna Rosemond, Mrs. George Walters.

The plot of the film focuses on the father who leaves during the Alaska gold rush, possibly referring to the Klondike Gold Rush or the Nome Gold Rush, both of which had concluded by the time the film was produced. The dreams of Ella were shot in New York City. Bowers states, "It is evident that Edwin Thanhouser loved New York City, for over the years he used it as a background for numerous films in scenarios which often played upon its faults, but which on balance depicted the city as the ultimate destination for those seeking culture and entertainment. Indeed, Edwin himself was to spend the final years of his life there - in an apartment on Fifth Avenue. By using a scenic background such as New York City - or Coney Island, or Niagara Falls - Thanhouser created films which had two appeals, that of a travelogue in addition to whatever merits the plot might have had."

== Release and reception ==
The single reel drama, approximately 1,000 feet long, was released on November 18, 1910. The film had a wide national release, with advertising theaters known in Kansas, North Carolina, Oklahoma, Nebraska, Arizona, Missouri, Texas, and Pennsylvania. The only known trade publication review is by The Moving Picture World and it is a positive one. The reviewer states, "A clear presentation of the visions of a child who wanted to go to the city. The vision is, perhaps, a bit more beatific than the actual city, but it unquestionably represents the imagined city of those who have never seen it. The awakening was rude, but happily the vision becomes real when the father appears with sufficient money to take the dreamer to the city for which she has longed. The acting and mechanical work on this picture are both of excellent quality." Another minor review of theater productions in the Arkansas City Daily Traveler said it was a good production.

== See also ==
- List of American films of 1910
