= The Millionaire Milkman =

1910 film

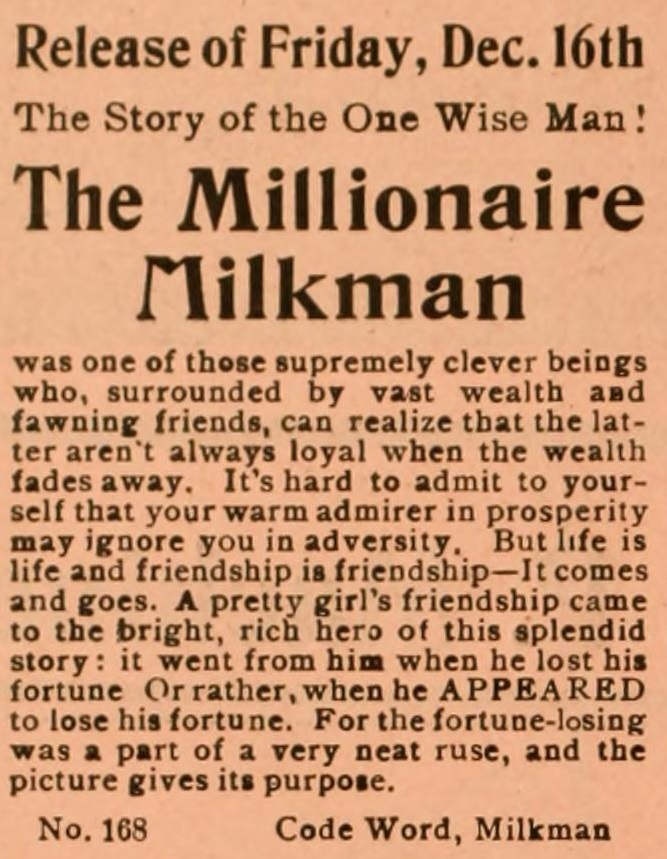
- Advertisement for the film
- Produced by: Thanhouser Company
- Distributed by: Motion Picture Distributing and Sales Company
- Release date: December 16, 1910
- Country: United States
- Languages: Silent film English intertitles

The Millionaire Milkman is a 1910 American silent short drama produced by the Thanhouser Company. The film focus on Jack Cass, a young millionaire, who has affections for a society girl named Clara Moore. Jack receives a letter of warning about Clara's real interest, his money. Jack decides to decides to test his suspicions and the character of Clara, by having newspapers announce the ruin of his mind and his fortune. Clara calls Jack to confirm the story and breaks off the engagement. May Dustin, the orphan girl who Clara's family treats as a servant, expresses sympathy for Jack. Jack becomes infatuated with May and becomes the milkman to see her every day. The two are married and May learns that Jack had never lost his fortune. The cast and production credits are unknown. The film was released on December 16, 1910, and met with mixed reviews. The film is presumed lost.

== Plot ==
Though the film is presumed lost, a synopsis survives in The Moving Picture World from December 17, 1910. It states: "Clara Moore is a society girl who has won the affections of Jack Cass, a young millionaire. He thinks she loves him, but it is really his money that she adores. Prompted by a letter of warning, Jack decides to prove his sweetheart's love. One reason is that he privately disapproves of the way Clara and her mother have treated a poor relation, an orphan girl, who has been left in their care. Instead of giving her a home, they make a servant of her. Jack's plot works like a charm. His faithful valet gives the newspapers the story of the failure of Jack's mind, and that young man's ruin. Clara reads it and when Jack calls and admits that the reports are correct, she returns his ring and says that all is over between them. In fact the only person in the house that shows any sympathy for Jack is the poor relation, May Dustin, and naturally he compares her with the heartless society girl. Jack wants to see more of May, and invents a unique way of doing so. He buys out the milkman who serves the family, and in that way is able to call on May everyday. Liking soon ripens into love, and May agrees to wed Jack, although thinking he has nothing in the world but a meager salary. After marriage she is told the truth and finds that her husband has money enough to supply her every wish. As for Clara, she has lost her only chance to win a prized millionaire."

== Production ==
The writer of the scenario is unknown, but it was most likely Lloyd Lonergan. He was an experienced newspaperman employed by The New York Evening World while writing scripts for the Thanhouser productions. The film director is unknown, but it may have been Barry O'Neil or Lucius J. Henderson. Cameramen employed by the company during this era included Blair Smith, Carl Louis Gregory, and Alfred H. Moses, Jr. though none are specifically credited. The role of the cameraman was uncredited in 1910 productions. The cast credits are unknown, but many 1910 Thanhouser productions are fragmentary. In late 1910, the Thanhouser company released a list of the important personalities in their films. The list includes G.W. Abbe, Justus D. Barnes, Frank H. Crane, Irene Crane, Marie Eline, Violet Heming, Martin J. Faust, Thomas Fortune, George Middleton, Grace Moore, John W. Noble, Anna Rosemond, Mrs. George Walters.

This film was an early example of the use of the character names Jack and May, which were repeatedly used by Lonergan in various productions. Film historian Q. David Bowers mentions that patrons who watched the film did not know the protagonist's name, as "it must have become a studio joke to decide who was to play Jack and who was to play May. In actuality, names such as Jack and May were used in printed synopses to keep track of who was who, but such names were usually not mentioned in the film's subtitles." The previous and first usage of the two leading character roles was in Dots and Dashes.

== Release and reception ==
The single reel drama, approximately 1,000 feet long, was released on December 16, 1910. At least one theater advertised the film as a comedy instead of a drama. The film had a wide national release, theaters showing the film include those in Kansas, Pennsylvania, South Dakota, and Arizona. The film was shown in Singapore in 1913.

The New York Dramatic Mirror praised the film for its well-execution, but it didn't miss a chance to balance it by criticizing the actor who played the milkman, "The Laura Jean Libbey style of romance is here presented with more than the usual success. ... The purchase of the milk delivery job was not convincing and the milkman talked too much at the camera; otherwise the picture is not seriously defective in detail." The Moving Picture World gave a positive review, concluding that "The life and action which characterize the Thanhouser productions are all present, while the photography is satisfactory and helps to make a good picture."

An unrelated comedy film with the same title was released by Pathé Frères on December 25, 1912.

== See also ==
- List of American films of 1910
