= Value—Beyond Price =

1910 American silent short drama film

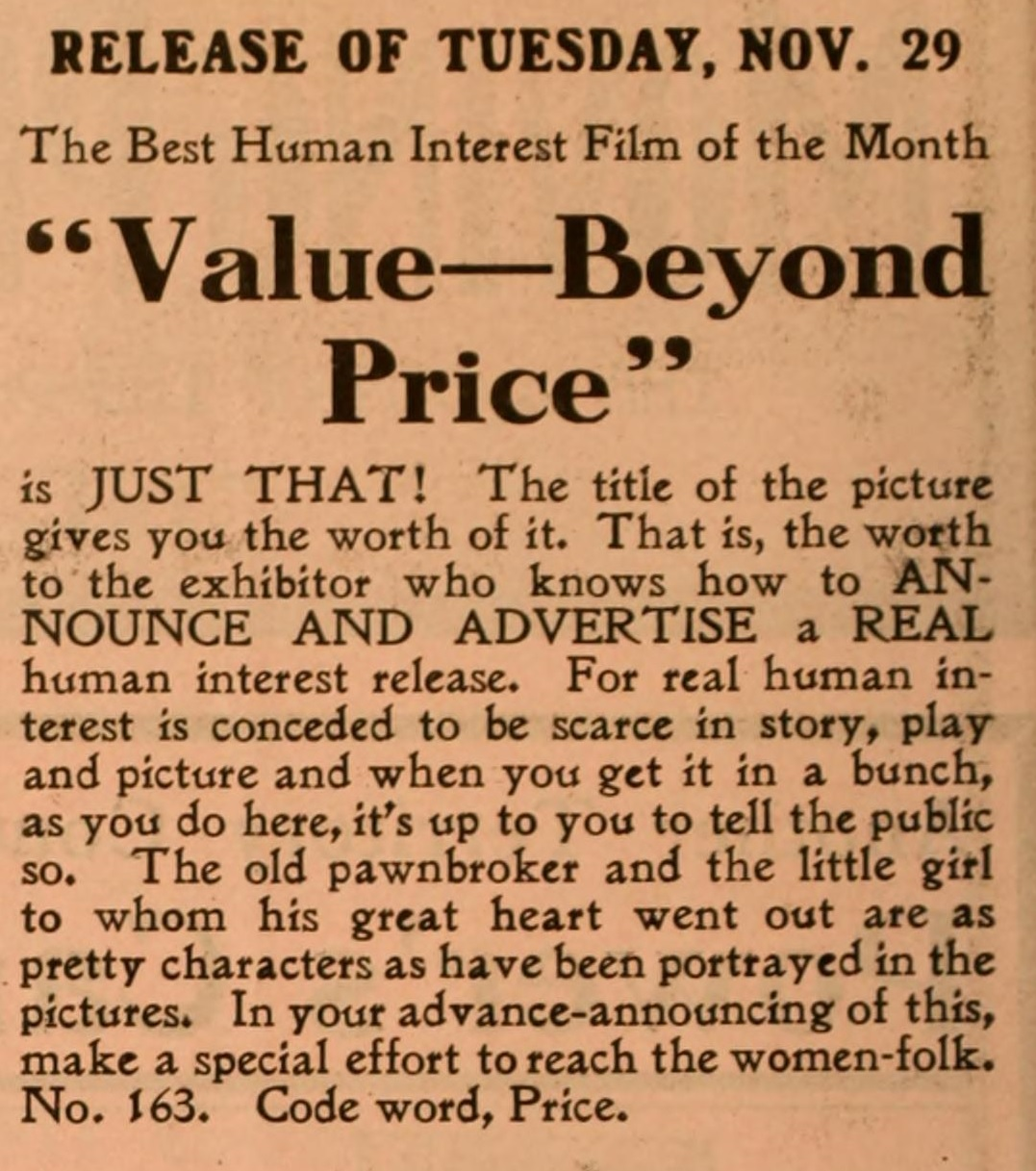
- Advertisement for the film
- Produced by: Thanhouser Company
- Distributed by: Motion Picture Distributing and Sales Company
- Release date: November 29, 1910
- Country: United States
- Languages: Silent film English intertitles

Value—Beyond Price is a 1910 American silent short drama produced by the Thanhouser Company. The film focuses on a family beset by tragedy when the father is presumed dead after his ship is lost at sea. The mother struggles to support her child and sells her possessions to a pawnbroker. When she has nothing left, save her wedding ring, the pawnbroker asks to take care of the child and the mother consents. The pawn broker gives her a pawn ticket for the girl stating "a precious jewel, a value beyond price" and tells her she can redeem it at any time. Before her death, she entrusts the ticket to a friend. Ten years pass, the shipwrecked father has discovered a great fortune on the island and is rescued by a passing steamship. The father soon realizes his wife is dead and his child is missing, but he receives the pawn ticket and decides to claim this jewel his wife had left for him. He redeems it at the pawn shop and finds it is his lost daughter. The film was released on November 29, 1910 and it was met with positive reviews. The film survives in the Library of Congress archives.

== Plot ==
Though a modern synopsis has not been published, the original synopsis was published in The Moving Picture World on December 3, 1910. It states: "Captain Smith sails away on his vessel for a trip around South America, through the Pacific, leaving behind him his wife and little girl, whom he dearly loves. The ship is reported lost with all on board, with the exception of a cabin boy who is picked up in mid ocean. The captain's wife struggles to support her child, but owing to a rapidly failing health she fights a losing battle with poverty. One by one her valued possessions find their way to the pawnshop, where the kind-hearted old pawnbroker, Levy, becomes interested in the sad-faced woman and pretty child, who never seem able to redeem any of their possessions. The last article of value left in Mrs. Smith's possession is her wedding ring, and Levy refuses to take this. Instead he offers her help, which the widow proudly refuses. She insists that she can go out and get work. Levy, seeing that he can help in no other way, offers to care for little Marie, and to this the mother finally gives her consent. Half in jest, Levy gives the mother a pawn ticket for the little girl, which he fills out to read that 'a precious jewel, a value beyond price,' has been left with him and can be redeemed 'at any time.' The mother leaves the little one in Levy's care and upon reaching home and finding herself mortally stricken, she puts the pawn ticket he has given her in an envelope which she entrusts to a friendly janitoress, to be given into no other hands than those of her husband should it be that he is not dead.

"And he is not. He has been cast up on a fertile island in the South Seas, where he lives a Crusoe-like existence for 10 years, and incidentally finds buried treasure which makes him rich. He was finally rescued by a passing steamer and brought back to his own country, only to find that in his absence his wife has died, no one knows the fate of his child. He only finds, in an envelope addressed to him in the hand of his dying wife, a pawn ticket for a 'precious jewel' which she has pledged. Thinking the jewel to be some gift of his to his wife, which she desired him to have as a remembrance, he goes to the pawnshop and is there waited upon by a sweet-faced girl of 15 to whom he is at once attracted. The girl is unable to find any article in the shop with a ticket corresponding to the number on the ticket which the captain carries, and appeals to her foster father, Levy, to help her find the gentleman's goods. Levy at once recognizes the ticket as the one he gave for his little adopted daughter. Although he dislikes to surrender the one joy of his life, he finally decides to reunite father and daughter. The latter have the old pawnbroker make his home with them, so the reunion brings happiness to all."

== Production ==
The writer of the scenario is unknown, but it was most likely Lloyd Lonergan. He was an experienced newspaperman employed by The New York Evening World while writing scripts for the Thanhouser productions. The film director is unknown, but it may have been Barry O'Neil or Lucius J. Henderson. Cameramen employed by the company during this era included Blair Smith, Carl Louis Gregory, and Alfred H. Moses, Jr. though none are specifically credited. The role of the cameraman was uncredited in 1910 productions. The only known cast credit is for Marie Eline having been in the film as the young child who is pawned. The other cast credits are unknown, but many 1910 Thanhouser productions are fragmentary. In late 1910, the Thanhouser company released a list of the important personalities in their films. The list includes G.W. Abbe, Justus D. Barnes, Frank H. Crane, Irene Crane, Marie Eline, Violet Heming, Martin J. Faust, Thomas Fortune, George Middleton, Grace Moore, John W. Noble, Anna Rosemond, Mrs. George Walters.

== Release and reception ==
The single reel drama, approximately 1,000 feet long, was released on November 29, 1910. One advertisement stated that an alternate title for the film was The Castaway Finds the Hidden Treasure, but this may be in error. The film had a wide national release, advertising theaters are known in Kansas, Texas, South Dakota, Vermont, and Missouri. The film was met with positive reviews by both The Moving Picture World and The New York Dramatic Mirror. The reviewer for the World highlighted that novelty of the subject, having the child being pawned only to be reclaimed by the father. Despite the novelty of the plot, the reviewer stated, "While the play attracts because of this novelty, it still has dramatic interest, dramatic because it tells a life story in a simple way. Such stories are the most interesting since there are numerous persons who see it that can duplicate it either in their own experience or the experience of some of their friends or acquaintances." The reviewer for the Mirror was critical of the film, stating the plot was improbable, but it was well-acted. The only fault identified by the reviewer was the improper depiction of the poor, for the mother could not keep her child, but kept her maid. The reviewer also noted that the maid also did not age after the apparent ten year time-skip.

In 2001, the Thanhouser Company Film Preservation acquired an original 35 mm nitrate film print from John Conning. The intention was to deposit the film in the Library of Congress. The surviving print is 925 feet in length, but it is not listed as being a whole or partial print.

== See also ==
- List of American films of 1910
