= Leon of the Table D'hote =

- Produced by: Thanhouser Company
- Distributed by: Motion Picture Distributing and Sales Company
- Release date: October 4, 1910
- Country: United States
- Languages: Silent film English intertitles

Leon of the Table D'hote is a 1910 American silent short comedy produced by the Thanhouser Company. The film follows Leon, a waiter at a table d'hote restaurant who is in love with Rosa, a French cashier at the same restaurant. Leon goes on vacation and poses as a foreign noble, attracts the interest of Violet Hope's mother as a suitable candidate to marry her daughter. While at the beach, Leon is knocked over by a breaking wave and Violet rescues him, earning Leon's gratitude. Rosa arrives after tracking Leon down and forces him to confess and return to the restaurant. Violet's mother then allows her daughter to marry the man of her choice. No cast or staff credits are known for the production. The film was released on October 4, 1910, and was met with praise by the reviewer of The New York Dramatic Mirror. The film is presumed lost.

== Plot ==
Though the film is presumed lost, a synopsis survives in The Moving Picture World from October 8, 1910. It states: "Leon is a waiter in a cheap table d'hote restaurant and makes desperate love to the fat French cashier, Rosa. Off on his vacation, Leon decides to pose as a foreign nobleman. At a seaside hotel where he stops, he becomes all the rage. One of the guests at the same hotel is a beautiful young heiress, a Violet Hope, whose designing mother at once conceives the idea of marrying her off to the supposed count. The plan does not meet with Violet's approval, she is already in love with a native born. One day while bathing in the surf, Violet, who is an expert swimmer, comes to the assistance of the bogus count, who has been knocked over by a breaker, and delivers him safely into the hands of the lifeguard. The count at once lays his life and fortune at Violet's feet, greatly to that young lady's disgust and her mother's delight. In the meantime Rosa becomes acquainted with the doings of her absent lover and traces him to the beach. Finding him in the water, and beyond her reach, Rosa also dons a bathing suit and after a chase through the waves, captures Leon and forces him to confess that he has been sailing under false colors. He was led back to the restaurant by the triumphant Rosa, while Violet obtains her mother's consent to wed the man of her choice."

== Production ==
The writer of the scenario is unknown, but it was most likely Lloyd Lonergan. He was an experienced newspaperman employed by The New York Evening World while writing scripts for the Thanhouser productions. The film director is unknown, but it may have been Barry O'Neil. Film historian Q. David Bowers does not attribute a cameraman for this production, but at least two possible candidates exist. Blair Smith was the first cameraman of the Thanhouser company, but he was soon joined by Carl Louis Gregory who had years of experience as a still and motion picture photographer. The role of the cameraman was uncredited in 1910 productions. The cast credits are unknown, but many 1910 Thanhouser productions are fragmentary. In late 1910, the Thanhouser company released a list of the important personalities in their films. The list includes G.W. Abbe, Justus D. Barnes, Frank H. Crane, Irene Crane, Marie Eline, Violet Heming, Martin J. Faust, Thomas Fortune, George Middleton, Grace Moore, John W. Noble, Anna Rosemond, Mrs. George Walters.

== Release and reception ==
The single reel comedy, approximately 1,000 feet long, was released on October 4, 1910. The film had a wide national release, with theaters showing the film in South Dakota, Indiana, Oklahoma, Pennsylvania, Missouri, Washington, Kansas, Maryland, and New Hampshire.

The film review by Walton of The Moving Picture News and The Moving Picture World bear an unusual expression about laying siege to an heiress that is used in both summaries. Bowers says both reviews were probably adapted from a "canned" review supplied by Thanhouser. Though it is uncertain if the review by The Moving Picture World which was issued on October 15 was picked up and reused by The Moving Picture News for the November 5 edition. The New York Dramatic Mirror reviewer offered praise for the production in its summary, "The Thanhouser players get considerable humor out of this comedy which is quite cleverly constructed and well acted. Leon is a waiter in a table d'hote restaurant. He bids his fat sweetheart, the restaurant cashier, good-bye and goes on his vacation, stopping at a seaside resort where he poses as a foreign count, captivates the ladies, and finds a rich mamma who wants to marry him to her daughter. The engagement gets into the papers, his fat sweetheart in town reads the news and takes the next train to the seaside hotel, where she makes short work of Leon, leading him off by the ear, to the great delight of the rich girl and her American lover. Amusing by-play is worked in, and the film pleases." An advertisement for the Jewel Theatre in Winfield Daily Free Press claimed it to be better than Home Made Mince Pie.

== See also ==
- List of American films of 1910
