= Delightful Dolly =

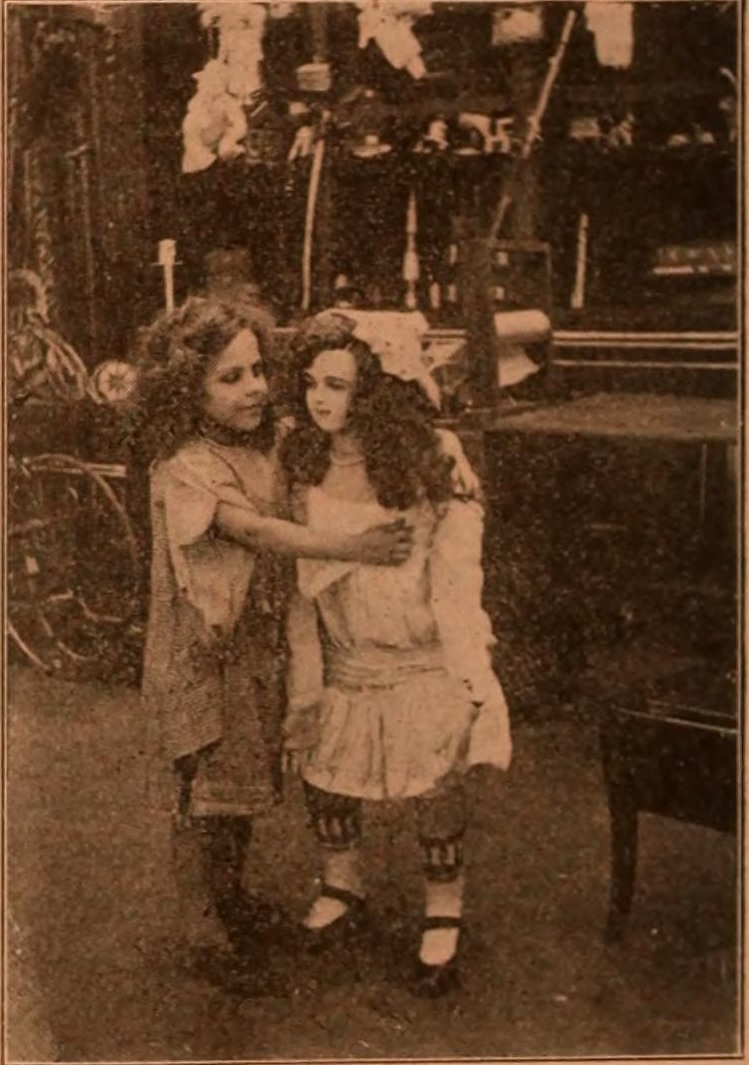
- Marie Eline and the doll
- Produced by: Thanhouser Company
- Distributed by: Motion Picture Distributing and Sales Company
- Release date: October 14, 1910
- Country: United States
- Languages: Silent film English intertitles

Delightful Dolly is a 1910 American silent short comedy film produced by the Thanhouser Company. The film follows Marie Allen, an orphan girl who lives with her grandfather, who sees a large doll in the window of the shop. At night, she sneaks out to visit the shop with the doll, but finds it gone. She sneaks into the shop and ends up hiding in the box, to prevent from being discovered by the store clerk. She is taken to the home of the rich little girl, Daisy. After taking the doll's clothes, Marie hides in the box as Daisy approaches. When Daisy opens the box, Marie acts like a doll. When Daisy takes a break for food, Marie secretly takes the food and drink much to Daisy's bewilderment. Marie's grandfather arrives at the home and explains the situation and Marie receives the doll from the family. Little is known about the production or cast of the film, but Marie Eline played the role of Marie. The film was released on October 14, 1910, and was met with some praise in trade publications. The film is presumed lost.

== Plot ==
Though the film is presumed lost, a synopsis survives in The Moving Picture World from October 15, 1910. It states: "Little Marie Allen, a penniless orphan, lives with her granddad. Out for a walk she admires a huge doll in a shop window. That night, after her granddad has fallen asleep, she slips out to have another look at the doll. Arriving at the toy shop, she sees that the doll is gone. Unseen by anyone, she enters the store. She finds the wonderful doll and lifts it out of its box to admire it. Hearing a clerk approaching, she becomes frightened and gets into the doll box. The doll rolls under the counter. The clerk sends the errand boy off with the box, thinking it contains the doll, which has been ordered for Daisy Smythe, a rich little girl. Arriving at Daisy's house, Marie steps out of the box as soon as the room is empty. She removes the doll clothes from the box and admires them greatly. She decides to try them on, and soon a little cap, shoes and garments are on her figure. Then she hears Daisy coming and retreats to the box. Daisy enters and takes the supposed doll from the box, falls in love with it instantly and enthusiastically works its arms and limbs. Marie lives up to her role well, imitating with stiff, jerky movements of the limbs that belong to real dolls. Then Daisy eats, and Marie grows hungry as she watches. When Daisy sets down her bowl of milk, Marie reaches over and drinks it down. Daisy is amazed when she misses the milk. Marie helps herself to all the food and Daisy's wonderment is amusing to see. Finally Daisy falls asleep in her chair and Marie falls asleep on the floor. Here she is found by her granddad, who managed to trace her from the toy shop, and Daisy and her mother laugh so heartily over Marie's adventure that they reward her cleverness with - the doll itself!"

== Cast ==
- Marie Eline as Marie Allen

The roles of Daisy Smythe and the grandfather were likely played by members of the Thanhouser Company, but the roles were uncredited and apparently not given in trade publications.

== Production ==
The writer of the scenario is unknown, but it was most likely Lloyd Lonergan. He was an experienced newspaperman employed by The New York Evening World while writing scripts for the Thanhouser productions. The film director is unknown, but it may have been Barry O'Neil. Film historian Q. David Bowers does not attribute a cameraman for this production, but at least two possible candidates exist. Blair Smith was the first cameraman of the Thanhouser company, but he was soon joined by Carl Louis Gregory who had years of experience as a still and motion picture photographer. The role of the cameraman was uncredited in 1910 productions. The role of Marie was played by Marie Eline, but the other cast credits are unknown. Many 1910 Thanhouser productions have fragmentary cast credits. In late 1910, the Thanhouser company released a list of the important personalities in their films. The list includes G.W. Abbe, Justus D. Barnes, Frank H. Crane, Irene Crane, Violet Heming, Martin J. Faust, Thomas Fortune, George Middleton, Grace Moore, John W. Noble, Anna Rosemond, Mrs. George Walters.

== Release and reception ==
The single reel comedy, approximately 1,000 feet long, was released on October 14, 1910. The film had a wide national release, with known theaters in North Carolina, Washington, Montana, Arizona, Kansas, and Minnesota. The film was also shown in Vancouver, British Columbia, Canada.

The review received barely a sentence from Walton of The Moving Picture News who stated it was: "Good from A to Z." The Moving Picture World offers little more, highlighting that the film would please children and offered a brief summary devoid of criticism or praise. The New York Dramatic Mirror gave a much more substantial treatment of the subject and stated, "This film, intended for juvenile patrons, has yet a charm for older spectators as well, because it tells a pretty story in a pretty way. ... The narrative is frankly impossible in plot, but that makes it no less entertaining to the youthful. A little make-believe is relished by the best of men. The acting of the wee heroine is really wonderful; it is spontaneous, lively, resourceful, graceful, and charming. The part of the rich girl, however, although it is capitally played, should have been entrusted to a smaller, if not to a younger, woman. The size of the actress makes the film look bizarre. The scenery is not all that might be desired, still it is passable." The effect and usage of a living doll would be attempted again with The Spoiled Darling's Doll, apparently with better success than Delightful Dolly.

== See also ==
- List of American films of 1910
