= The Wild Flower and the Rose =

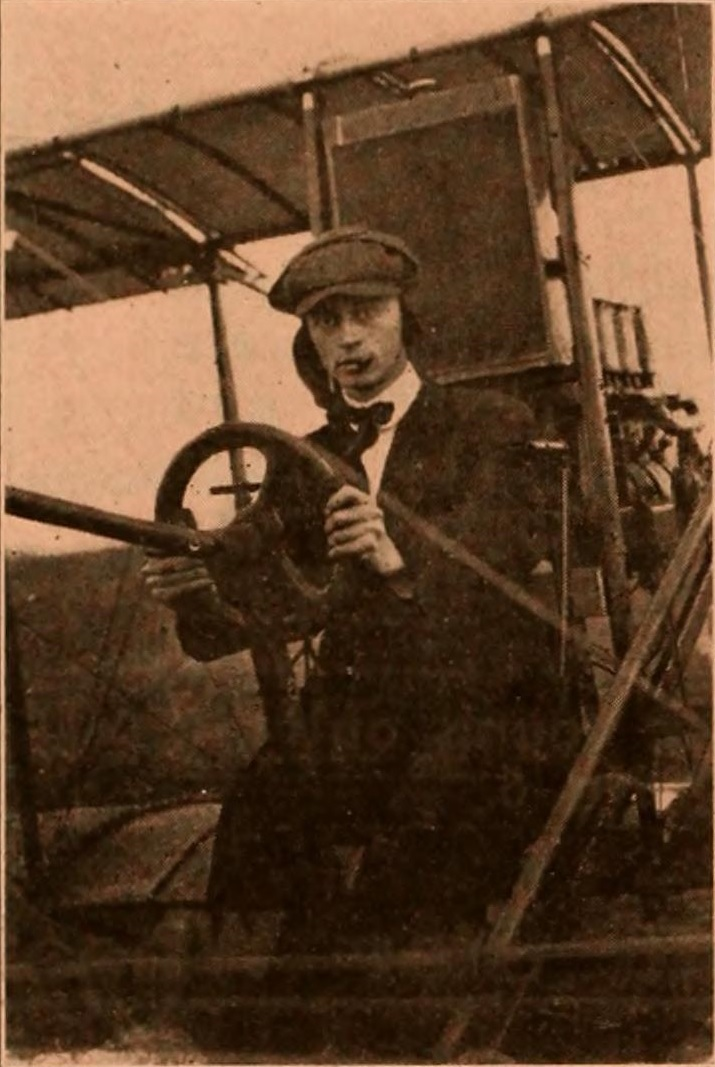
- A film still from the lost film
- Produced by: Thanhouser Company
- Distributed by: Motion Picture Distributing and Sales Company
- Release date: November 25, 1910
- Country: United States
- Languages: Silent film English intertitles

The Wild Flower and the Rose is a 1910 American silent short drama produced by the Thanhouser Company. The film focuses on Frank Wilson, the son of an inventor who has constructed a new airplane model. After failing to secure financing, his father suggests that he marry Rose, the daughter of his wealthy employer, to get the money they need. Jack rejects this idea because he is engaged to another woman, but he soon learns she does not love him. He heads out West to seek a fortune and is quickly successful. He returns to the aviation field and meets Rose again, after a successful flight she confesses to loving him. The cast and staff credits are unknown, but the film may have included scenes from the 1910 International Aviation Meet at Belmont Park. One reviewer claimed that a Wright brothers flyer was also shown in full flight. The film was released on November 25, 1910, but is now presumed lost.

== Plot ==
Though the film is presumed lost, a synopsis survives in The Moving Picture World from November 26, 1910. It states: "Frank Wilson is the son of an inventor who has perfected an airship model in which Jack is greatly interested, but neither of them has the money to finance. Wilson tries to interest his wealthy employer, Fisher, but is unsuccessful in the attempt. However, he gains the support of his employer's beautiful daughter, Rose. The old inventor suggests to his son that they could secure the money to perfect the invention if he marries Rose. But Jack spurns the idea, as he is already engaged in marrying a country girl, Daisy Lane, who, he believes, loves him devotedly. Upon learning that Daisy is a heartless coquette, Jack is heartbroken, and goes west to seek a fortune, forgetting her conduct. Success comes to him quickly, and he returns to tell his father that now, unaided, they can finance the invention. Jack once more meets Rose in the aviation field and confesses to her that the memory of her kindness has helped him achieve success. Jack makes a successful flight in the invention – a new style of airplane – and in offering her congratulations, Rose confesses that she has loved him from the first."

== Production ==
The writer of the scenario is unknown, but it was most likely Lloyd Lonergan. He was an experienced newspaperman employed by The New York Evening World while writing scripts for the Thanhouser productions. The film director is unknown, but it may have been Barry O'Neil or Lucius J. Henderson. Cameramen employed by the company during this era included Blair Smith, Carl Louis Gregory, and Alfred H. Moses, Jr. though none are specifically credited. The role of the cameraman was uncredited in 1910 productions. The cast credits are unknown, but many 1910 Thanhouser productions are fragmentary. In late 1910, the Thanhouser company released a list of the important personalities in their films. The list includes G.W. Abbe, Justus D. Barnes, Frank H. Crane, Irene Crane, Marie Eline, Violet Heming, Martin J. Faust, Thomas Fortune, George Middleton, Grace Moore, John W. Noble, Anna Rosemond, Mrs. George Walters.

It is unknown when the film was shot, but the aviation meet may have been at Belmont Park in Long Island, New York. The second International Aviation Meet took place from October 22–30, 1910. One newspaper would state that a "one of the Wright Brothers' 1910 model flying machines" was shown in full flight.

== Release and reception ==
The single reel drama, approximately 1,000 feet long, was released on November 25, 1910. The film had a wide national release, known advertising theaters include those in Nebraska, North Carolina, Pennsylvania, Arizona, Indiana, Montana, and Oklahoma, The New York Dramatic Mirror was neutral to slightly praising the production. The reviewer stated, "It is a discursive narrative, not bound by laws of cause and effect, although it does not contradict them. It is amusing to see the rapidity with which a motion picture hero goes West. He throws a toothbrush and his pajamas into a suitcase, takes his hat over his arm, and breaks the news to his father before stepping from the living room out into the street. The special point of this film is the aviation exhibition, which is well handled. The hero is a very jocose gentleman, who smiles broadly with and without provocation. Other parts are adequately filled." The Moving Picture World spared three roughly three sentences surrounding the focus of the plot, "A love story built up around the invention of a new type of airplane. The machine flies and the inventor gets the girl of his choice. The picture has, therefore, a pleasant ending."

== See also ==
- List of American films of 1910
