= Mistress and Maid (film) =

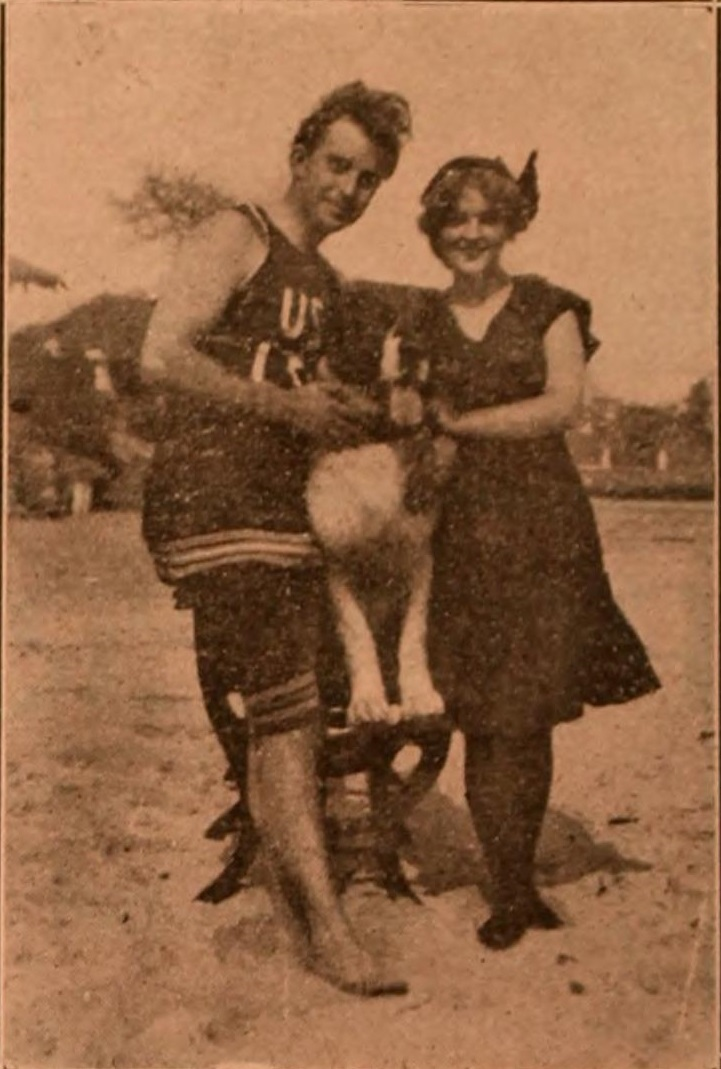
- A publicity film still for the film
- Produced by: Thanhouser Company
- Distributed by: Motion Picture Distributing and Sales Company
- Release date: November 1, 1910
- Country: United States
- Languages: Silent film English intertitles

Mistress and Maid is a 1910 American silent short drama produced by the Thanhouser Company. The film focuses on Nan Willis, a wealthy heiress, who visits a seaside resort with her maid, Susan. The two decide to trade roles and Nan encounters a young lifeguard with whom she falls in love with. Susan plots against Nan to steal her valuables and orchestrates a plot with a lighthouse keeper to lock Nan in the tower for a share of the spoils. Nan's Newfoundland dog is sent on a rescue message and delivers a message to the lifeguard. He arrives and rescues Nan from her jailer before hurrying back to the hotel, catching Susan in the act. Nan decides not to only dismiss instead of punish her maid because she her new-found love more than compensates the hardships she went through. The cast and credits for the film are unknown. The film was released on November 11, 1910, to mixed reviews in trade publications. The film is presumed lost.

== Plot ==
Though the film is presumed lost, a synopsis survives in The Moving Picture World from November 5, 1910. It states: "Nan Willis is a wealthy young heiress who visits the fashionable seaside resort at which she is unknown. She is accompanied only by her maid, Susan, an envious woman, who bears her mistress no great love. Bored by the even tenor of her life, Nan decides to seek adventure by changing places with her maid, and thus escaping the restrictions of conventionality with which she has constantly been surrounded. She makes the acquaintance of a young lifeguard, Jim Holt, and accepts his offer to teach her to swim. A very real affection springs up between the two young people, and Nan is sure that Jim, unlike her other suitors, loves her for herself alone, as he thinks her only a lady's maid. While visiting an isolated lighthouse, Nan, accompanied only by Sue, is made a prisoner in one of the upper rooms of the structure. The plot is Sue's who hopes thus to be able to make her escape with Nan's jewels and other valuables. The rascal, a young keeper of the lighthouse, and his miserly old grandmother are made a party to the plot by accepting an offer to share in the spoils. Through her faithful Newfoundland dog, who braves an angry sea, Nan sends a message to her lifeguard sweetheart, who comes instantly to her aid. After a spirited encounter with the keeper of the light, who is also Nan's jailer, the young people make their escape in Jim's boat. They reach the hotel in time to confront Susan, who cringes with fear when caught red-handed with her mistress' belongings. Nan allows Susan to go unpunished, feeling that the happiness she has found in the proof of Jim's unselfish love more than compensates her for all the hardships she has endured."

== Production ==
The writer of the scenario is unknown, but it was most likely Lloyd Lonergan. He was an experienced newspaperman employed by The New York Evening World while writing scripts for the Thanhouser productions. The film director is unknown, but it may have been Barry O'Neil or Lucius J. Henderson. Cameramen employed by the company during this era included Blair Smith, Carl Louis Gregory, and Alfred H. Moses, Jr. though none are specifically credited. The role of the cameraman was uncredited in 1910 productions. The cast credits are unknown, but many 1910 Thanhouser productions are fragmentary. In late 1910, the Thanhouser company released a list of the important personalities in their films. The list includes G.W. Abbe, Justus D. Barnes, Frank H. Crane, Irene Crane, Marie Eline, Violet Heming, Martin J. Faust, Thomas Fortune, George Middleton, Grace Moore, John W. Noble, Anna Rosemond, Mrs. George Walters. A special focus in the film was the Newfoundland dog who played the key role in foiling the plot and was promoted in advertising for the film.

== Release and reception ==
The single reel drama, approximately 1,000 feet long, was released on November 1, 1910. The film likely had a wide national release, theaters advertising the film are known in Pennsylvania, Kansas, Indiana, and Montana. In 1917, years after its widespread release, the Pennsylvania State Board of Censors of Moving Pictures would approve it for viewing without modification.

Walton of The Moving Picture News praised the film, "The theme is not new, but the way it is handled, in this case, gives it a new interest. A film that grips and by skillful presentation must be popular. The lighthouse scenes and the dog won deserved applause." The Moving Picture World was more specific in its praise. The reviewer stated, "There is life and animation enough to suit the most exacting, with good acting and clear photography as features of the picture." The New York Dramatic Mirror contained a scathing review, "The young actress with the pretty face who played the part of the mistress in this impossible melodrama should learn to show us her back once in a while. Perhaps it is the director who is to blame; at any rate, this thing of constantly twisting the attitude so that one can face the front ruins the sense of reality that must be depended on to make motion picture acting effective, especially so in this film, which is so far-fetched in its melodramatic situations that no single element of the motion picture producing art should be dispensed with."

== See also ==
- List of American films of 1910
