= Oh, What a Knight! =

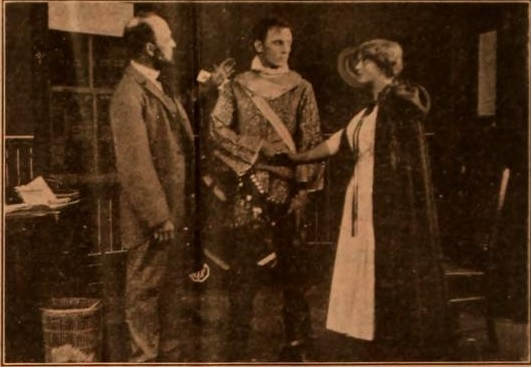
- A surviving film still
- Produced by: Thanhouser Company
- Distributed by: Motion Picture Distributing and Sales Company
- Release date: October 18, 1910
- Running time: 11 minutes
- Country: United States
- Languages: Silent; English intertitles

Oh, What a Knight! is a 1910 American silent short drama film produced by the Thanhouser Company. The film follows a young woman, named May Brandon, who dreams a medieval fantasy in which she is wooed, rescued and married by a loyal knight. When she awakes, she dismisses her fiancé and tells him of her dream. He decides to become the knight of her dreams and dresses as one, but the experience is unpleasant and ruins her fantasy. There are no known staff or cast credits for the film, but a surviving film still shows three actors. The film was released on October 18, 1910 and was met with praise by The New York Dramatic Mirror. The film had a wide national release and was also shown in Canada.

== Plot ==
Oh, What a Knight! (1910)

Though the film is presumed lost, a synopsis survives in The Moving Picture World from October 22, 1910. It states: "May Brandon is a young woman of the present day who finds that the course of true love can sometimes run too smooth. She is engaged to the man of her choice, but no one objects. In fact, there is not the slightest opposition to her marriage in any quarter. And, being a woman, she does not like it. Perhaps she would have been married in the orthodox way had it not been for a dream that she had. In her sleep she found herself a beautiful young woman, persecuted because she was loyal to the knight she had selected. Her father was obdurate, and finally practically made her a prisoner in his gloomy old castle. Her sweetheart called with a rope ladder. They escaped, and after a number of thrilling adventures were married, and presumably lived happy forever afterwards. When May awoke, she was more discontented than ever. She flouted her fiancé, and returned his ring and swore she would never marry him. But finally she told him of her dream, and he won forgiveness by promising to run away with her like the knight of her dreams. Being a man of his word, he did. But the romance all faded out of it. The adventures they passed through were not to the woman's liking, and her experience convinced her that swashbuckling knights are as much out of date as are stagecoaches."

== Production ==
The writer of the scenario is unknown, but it was most likely Lloyd Lonergan. He was an experienced newspaperman employed by The New York Evening World while writing scripts for the Thanhouser productions. The film director is unknown, but it may have been Barry O'Neil. Film historian Q. David Bowers does not attribute a cameraman for this production, but at least two possible candidates exist. Blair Smith was the first cameraman of the Thanhouser company, but he was soon joined by Carl Louis Gregory who had years of experience as a still and motion picture photographer. The role of the cameraman was uncredited in 1910 productions. The cast credits are unknown, but many 1910 Thanhouser productions are fragmentary. In late 1910, the Thanhouser company released a list of the important personalities in their films. The list includes G.W. Abbe, Justus D. Barnes, Frank H. Crane, Irene Crane, Marie Eline, Violet Heming, Martin J. Faust, Thomas Fortune, George Middleton, Grace Moore, John W. Noble, Anna Rosemond, Mrs. George Walters. A surviving film still gives the possibility of identifying three of the actors in the film.

== Release and reception ==
The single reel drama, approximately 1,000 feet long, was released on October 18, 1910. The film is known to have had a wide national release, with showing theaters in South Dakota, New Hampshire, Oklahoma, Kansas, Pennsylvania, Indiana, Maryland, Nebraska, North Carolina, Montana, and Missouri. The film was also shown in Vancouver, British Columbia, Canada by the Province Theatre.

The Moving Picture News and The Moving Picture World were both neutral in their review of the film, giving neither specific praise nor criticism of the production. The New York Dramatic Mirror review was positive: "This idea has been used quite recently in an Independent film, but not nearly so effectively as in the hands of the capable Thanhouser players. They give the farcical events an air of reality that goes far to strengthen the comical results. ... She insists on her lover rigging himself up in knightly costume and carrying her off on a horse to be married. The absurdity of this business in modern times is not made as much of as might have been, but it brings plenty of laughter. The actress who played the part of the girl marred her work by turning too often to face the camera. She is very pretty and attractive but she should not permit it to appear that she is so well aware of her beauty." (Note: It is unknown which film is being referred to by the reviewer, but many obscure films were produced amongst the Independents. The possibility exists that the reviewer may have been mistaken or misleading because the publication was quite slanted against the Independents.) Some advertisements by theaters heavily promoted the comedy aspect of the film with generic quips.

== See also ==
- List of American films of 1910
- Oh, What a Knight! on Vimeo
