= Avenged (1910 film) =

1910 film

- Produced by: Thanhouser Company
- Distributed by: Motion Picture Distributing and Sales Company
- Release date: October 7, 1910
- Country: United States
- Languages: Silent film English intertitles

Avenged is a 1910 American silent short drama produced by the Thanhouser Company. The film is a melodrama focusing on John Warren, a young clerk, who is struck by a taxi cab while crossing the street. The chauffeur who struck him, Allen, decides to flee as a crowd gathers around John. Allen ditches his taxi on a country road and takes a train, successfully escaping. Six years later, the poor, ill and crippled John has become a timekeeper in a mining town. John's wife, who has taken care of him, sickens and dies. Allen, unaware of John's identity, attempts to comfort him and listens to John's story. After learning Allen wrecked his life, John attempts to shoot him, but the specter of his wife stays his hand. John goes to her grave, forgives Allen, and dies. No cast or production credits are known for this film. Released on October 7, 1910, the film was a distinct departure from other Thanhouser releases and was sharply criticized by reviewers. The film is presumed lost.

== Plot ==
Though the film is presumed lost, a synopsis survives in The Moving Picture World from October 8, 1910. It states: "John Warren, a prosperous young clerk, is run down by a taxi cab while crossing a city street. The chauffeur, Allen, afraid of the consequences of his carelessness, makes his escape when he sees a crowd gathering around his victim. He abandons his machine on a lonely country road, and catching a westbound train, succeeds in making good his escape. Six years later finds John, now a cripple, living in a mining town with his devoted wife. Here John, incapacitated from other work, lives out a miserable existence as the timekeeper at the mine. Here, also, Allen comes, applying for work as a miner. They do not recognize each other. John, poor and ill, is visited by another misfortune. His beloved wife, who has clung to him through all the years of his adversity, sickens and dies. His one joy in life is taken from him. John refuses to be comforted by Allen, who feels deep sympathy for the poor cripple. While reciting his sad history to Allen, John learns for the first time that Allen is the man who, by crippling him, wrecked his life. At last the vengeance he has sought all these years is within his reach. He raises his gun to end Allen's existence, when a vision of his wife appears, breathing the message, 'Vengeance is Mine, sayeth the Lord.' (Note: This is a reference to Romans 12. The line: "Vengeance is mine; I will repay, saith the Lord." (King James Version)) John rushes from the house to the grave of his loved one, and there, after forgiving Allen, dies at peace with mankind."

== Production ==
The writer of the scenario is unknown, but it was most likely Lloyd Lonergan. He was an experienced newspaperman employed by The New York Evening World while writing scripts for the Thanhouser productions. The film director is unknown, but it may have been Barry O'Neil. Film historian Q. David Bowers does not attribute a cameraman for this production, but at least two possible candidates exist. Blair Smith was the first cameraman of the Thanhouser company, but he was soon joined by Carl Louis Gregory who had years of experience as a still and motion picture photographer. The role of the cameraman was uncredited in 1910 productions. The cast credits are unknown, but many 1910 Thanhouser productions are fragmentary. In late 1910, the Thanhouser company released a list of the important personalities in their films. The list includes G.W. Abbe, Justus D. Barnes, Frank H. Crane, Irene Crane, Marie Eline, Violet Heming, Martin J. Faust, Thomas Fortune, George Middleton, Grace Moore, John W. Noble, Anna Rosemond, Mrs. George Walters. In one scene, the appearance of the wife was described as being facilitated by "trick printing", and was possibly created by a double exposure. Bowers notes that the sister was listed as the wife in the official synopsis, but it is unlikely that such a distinction in cast roles was ever made in the inter-titles due to the confusion. Bowers stated that names were used in to keep track of who was who, but patrons were unaware of the characters' names.

== Release and reception ==
The single reel drama, approximately 1,000 feet long, was released on October 7, 1910. The film likely had a wide national release, with advertising theaters known in Kansas, Maryland, Illinois, Oklahoma, and Minnesota.

The film received negative reviews in trade publications and it was deemed a distinct departure from the nature of other Thanhouser releases. The film's plot was criticized by reviewers for being concerned main character's misery. In response to the illogical plot, The New York Dramatic Mirror reviewer stated, "Why the cripple should go West as soon as he is able to hobble isn't clear; perhaps the West is such a delightfully vague term that it induces haziness of reasoning." The reviewer also noted the inexplicable reason why Allen, who originally fled, would suddenly consent to be willingly murdered by John. The reviewer opined that the story was almost maudlin in places and the acting was not sincere because the actors knew the plot was absurd. The Moving Picture World also reviewed the film quite negatively, "Possibly the dramatic qualities of this picture are sufficient reason for its existence; but it has no other reason. It is not entertaining. It is not instructive. It cannot amuse. The shadow of death pervades it and the horror tragedy is the principal factor. It is such a departure from the usual Thanhouser that it seems as though the regular producer was absent when it flipped past the company's censor." Advertisers for the film listed it in a variety of ways from a strong drama to having real mining activities. The film is presumed lost.

== See also ==
- List of American films of 1910
