= Not Guilty (1910 film) =

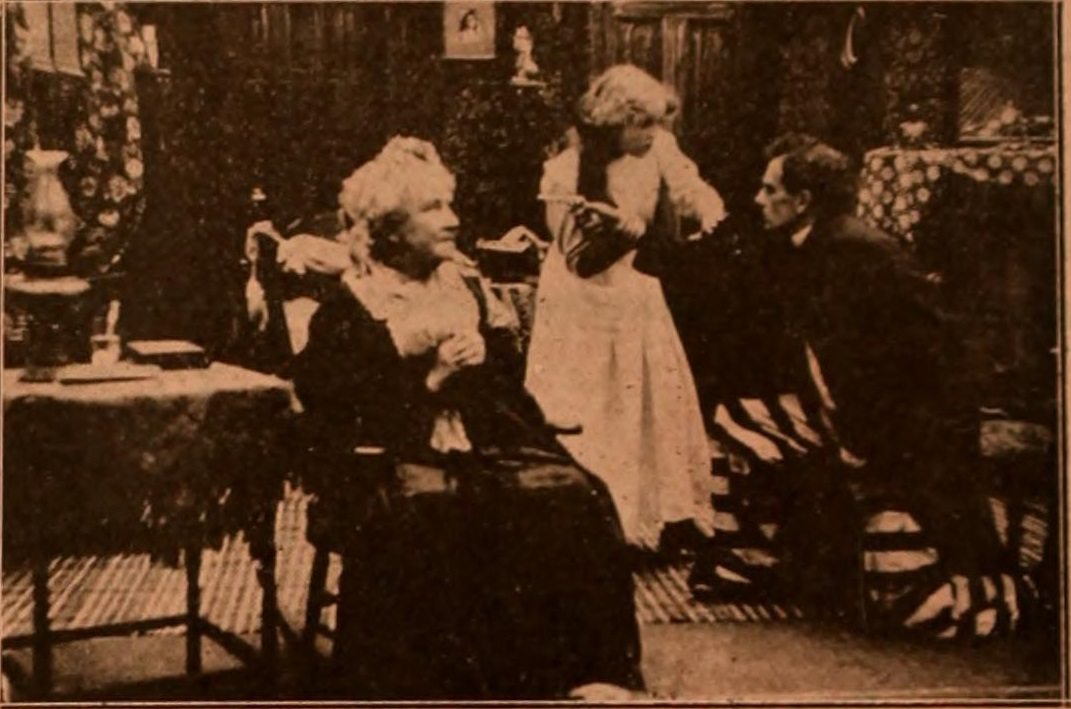
- A film still
- Written by: Lloyd Lonergan (unconfirmed)
- Produced by: Thanhouser Company
- Distributed by: Motion Picture Distributing and Sales Company
- Release date: September 20, 1910
- Running time: 14 minutes
- Country: United States
- Languages: Silent; English intertitles

Not Guilty is a 1910 American silent short drama film produced by the Thanhouser Company. The film focuses on Harry Martin who bids goodbye to his blind mother before he leaves the house and soon encounters a fleeing thief. The thief deposits a stolen purse into Harry's pocket and the police promptly discover and arrest Harry. They take him back to his home where he bids goodbye and is jailed. His blind mother becomes ill, under the false belief that her son is away on a journey. After he learns of this, he breaks out and returns home. The police surround and search the house and Harry flees to another building on a clothesline. Successfully having eluded the police, Harry buys a paper the following morning and discovers that the real thief has turned himself in. The film is known for its early use of a close-up shot to portray the complex action of the thief depositing the purse into Harry's pocket. The film was released on September 20, 1910, and met with mixed reviews. The film survives in the Library of Congress archives.

== Plot ==
Not Guilty (1910)

The film begins with Harry Martin saying goodbye to his blind mother before leaving the house. About this time Joinville, a thief, has committed a robbery and is being chased down the street by the policemen. Harry and the thief encounter each other on the street and a struggle ensues, Joinville slips the stolen purse into his pocket before fleeing. The police encounter Martin and find the stolen purse before promptly arresting him. Harry's sweetheart visits Martin's mother and the police take Harry to his apartment. Harry bids his mother and his sweetheart goodbye, an inter-title car states that Harry does not want his mother to know he has gone away on a journey instead of to jail.

Time passes and Harry receives a note from Kate, his sweetheart, that his mother is very ill and wants him to return. In the note, Kate states that it is impossible to prove his innocence. Harry escapes on a passing wagon, concealed in corn or hay, and returns home. The police gather and surround search the home, Harry escapes via a clothesline to another building, successfully eluding the police. The following morning, Harry buys a newspaper from a newspaperboy and reads of his innocence after the real thief confesses to the crime. The three rejoice at his proven innocence. (Note: This summary was derived from the official synopsis and the modern synopsis provided by Bowers.)

== Cast ==
- Frank H. Crane as Harry Martin
- Marie Eline as the newspaper boy

== Production ==
The writer of the scenario is unknown, but it was most likely Lloyd Lonergan. He was an experienced newspaperman employed by The New York Evening World while writing scripts for the Thanhouser productions. The film director is unknown, but it may have been Barry O'Neil. Film historian Q. David Bowers does not attribute a cameraman for this production, but at least two possible candidates exist. Blair Smith was the first cameraman of the Thanhouser company, but he was soon joined by Carl Louis Gregory who had years of experience as a still and motion picture photographer. The role of the cameraman was uncredited in 1910 productions. Some of the cast credits are unknown, but most of the 1910 Thanhouser productions are fragmentary. The film survives in the Library of Congress, but the other actors in the production are not listed.

The film shows novel techniques in film production that were used to assist the viewer in understanding the narrative. In the beginning of the film, when Harry and the thief struggle, a closeup shot is used to show the thief placing the purse into Harry's pocket. While the two struggle in the previous scene, the close-up shot has both men standing still. Charlie Keil, author of Early American Cinema in Transition, cites this as an attempt to improve the narrative by allowing a complex sequence of events to be examined intelligibly by the viewer. Keil also states that shot may have been done to lessen trade press objections to the close-up views by showing the value to the narrative development. When Harry is in jail, he imagines his mother, and this is shown by an inset at the upper right of film. Months after the film had been released, Robert Grau wrote a column in the Moving Picture World which praised the attention to detail in the production for a newspaper which was shown on camera for only a few seconds. Grau states, "I was unable to discern in the few seconds the effect was on view, what means were taken to create the illusion ... and it is consoling to know that the producers of photoplays are aspiring to reach great heights in such matters." An analysis of the frame shows that it was not so much an illusion as pasting the headline on the edition of August 27, 1910 of the New York City Herald Tribune. The film also shows a real and dangerous stunt executed by Crane, where he is seen "sliding 40 feet down a washline to liberty in a scene that couldn't have been faked."

== Release and reception ==
The single reel drama, approximately 1,000 feet long, was released on September 20, 1910. The film likely had a wide national release, similar to other Thanhouser productions, theater advertisements are known in Missouri, Minnesota, Indiana, and Kansas. In 1915, years after its national release, the Pennsylvania State Board of Censors of Moving Pictures reviewed the film and approved its content without modification.

The film received mixed reception by trade publications. Walton of The Moving Picture News stated, "The tender end, mother, is good; it's well acted. What I said about The Doctor's Carriage I repeat. This theme is far-fetched; the convict stripes unnecessary. Whoever was at the helm in this picture was just a little bit mixed - as to the course." The Moving Picture World's review was more neutral and stated the film was rather engaging and it will keep the audiences interest. The reviewer did not find either specific praise or fault in the actual production itself. The New York Dramatic Mirror was the most detailed in its review. The reviewer states, "There are very strong situations in this picture story, based on the efforts of a young man and his sweetheart to prevent the young man's mother from knowing that he has been sent to prison. ... In a series of melodramatic scenes that are not as convincing as they might be, we see the son elude the penitentiary officers, and later he returns openly to his home with a newspaper in which is printed the confession of the criminal who had committed the offense of which the son had been convicted. Some of the scenes were handled too abruptly for the best results, but otherwise the acting appears satisfactory." Bowers notes that the Mirror was not without its detractors and was accused of being a tool of the Edison Trust companies, but reviews for Thanhouser films were amongst the most perceptive.

== See also ==
- List of American films of 1910
