= The Doctor's Carriage =

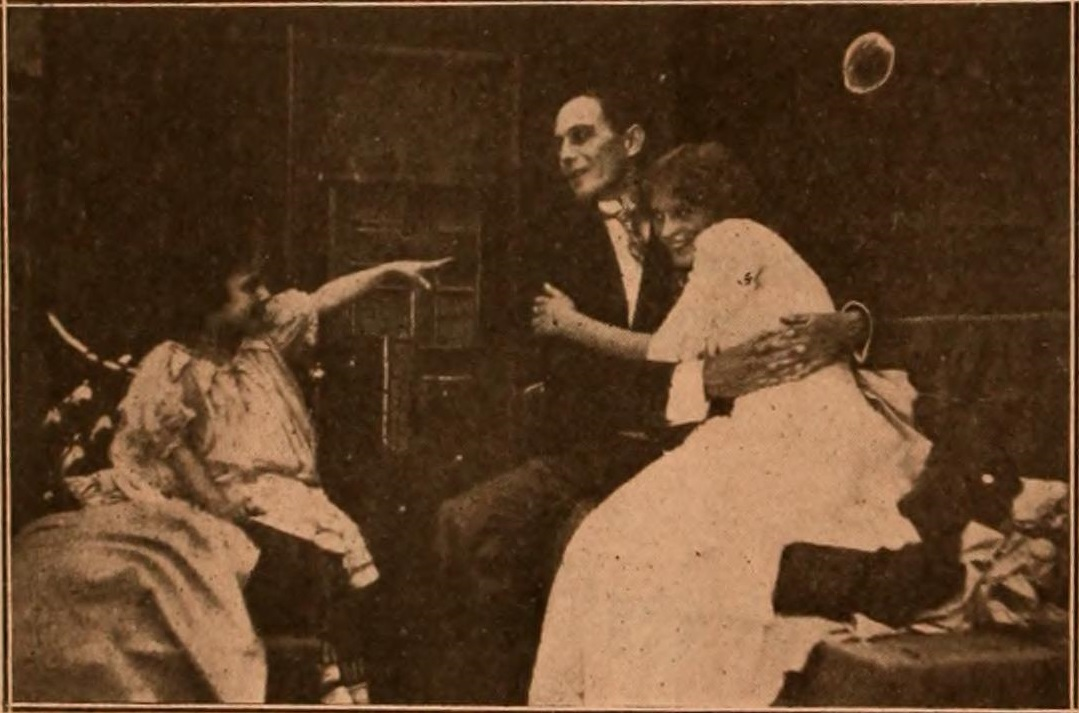
- A surviving film still
- Produced by: Thanhouser Company
- Distributed by: Motion Picture Distributing and Sales Company
- Release date: September 9, 1910
- Country: United States
- Languages: Silent film English intertitles

The Doctor's Carriage is a 1910 American silent short drama produced by the Thanhouser Company. The plot is a melodrama that features Marie Eline in the starring role. The film begins with Max, an old musician who has two daughters, one of whom is blind. Max becomes ill and dies and without a mother to raise them, the younger daughter cares for her older sister, but they are homeless and poor. The little girl begs a doctor to restore her sister's vision and he proposes to her. The film was released on September 9, 1910, and was met with praise from reviewers. The film saw a wide national release and was also shown in Canada, Britain and Australia. The film is presumed lost.

== Plot ==
Though the film is presumed lost, a synopsis survives in The Bioscope from December 22, 1910. It states: "Max, an old musician, finds it hard to support his two motherless daughters, one of whom is blind, and the professor takes great pride in his daughters' musical education. The little one sings and the blind girl plays upon the violin. But sickness and death overtake the professor, and the orphans find themselves penniless and homeless. They are compelled to sing in the streets, and thus eke out a precarious livelihood. While walking through a fashionable street one day Marie sees the sign of the famous doctor. She calls her blind sister's attention to it, but the girl has no hope that the doctor will see penniless patients. Marie returns in time to see the doctor alight from his carriage, but the servant refuses to allow the ragged little girl to follow him. Marie conceives the idea of hiding in the doctor's carriage, and when he sets out on his rounds he discovers the terrified little girl. She pleads with him not to be angry, and tells of her sister's affliction. The doctor goes with her to see Violet, and has the stricken girl taken to a hospital, where he operates successfully upon her eyes. Mr. Grey brings Violet to the attention of some charitable women, who see that she does not lack professional engagements. While returning from one of her recitals, Dr. Grey offers to drive her home, and proposes to Violet, and is accepted. Marie is awakened by the sound of a kiss, and is told that she is to have a big brother."

== Production ==
The writer of the scenario is unknown, but it was most likely Lloyd Lonergan. He was an experienced newspaperman employed by The New York Evening World while writing scripts for the Thanhouser productions. According to an advertisement for the film, the plot was written especially for Marie Eline, also known as the Thanhouser Kid, as a feature which would show her abilities. Eline's role and actions were described in a deus ex machina fashion by The New York Dramatic Mirror reviewer because of her actions to guide and assist her blind sister. Though, Lonergan liked to use the dramatic technique in the conclusion of the plots, it was not like the usage in The Actor's Children. It is also not the most striking example of the technique, in The Restoration the runaway child picks a doorstep to rest upon in a city, at complete random, is taken in by a recently engaged wealthy woman and reunited with her amnesia-struck father. The film director is unknown, but it may have been Barry O'Neil. Film historian Q. David Bowers does not attribute a cameraman for this production, but at least two possible candidates exist. Blair Smith was the first cameraman of the Thanhouser company, but he was soon joined by Carl Louis Gregory who had years of experience as a still and motion picture photographer. The role of the cameraman was uncredited in 1910 productions. Cast in the starring role is Marie Eline as the little girl. A surviving film still gives the possibility of identifying two more actors in the production. The other credits amongst the cast are unknown, but most of the credits are fragmentary for 1910 Thanhouser productions.

== Release and reception ==
The single reel drama, approximately 1,000 feet long, was released on September 9, 1910. The film had a wide national release, theater advertisements are known in Pennsylvania, New Hampshire, Wisconsin, Montana, Minnesota, Washington, Arizona, Indiana, Texas, Illinois, Kansas, Nebraska, and Oklahoma. The film was released in Britain on December 25, 1910. The film was also shown in Perth, Australia by mid-December 1910. The film was also shown in Vancouver, British Columbia, Canada. One of the last advertisements for the film, labeling incorrectly as from the Independent Motion Picture Company, is from a Nebraska theater in July 1912.

The film was reviewed positively by reviewers of the trade publications. A very positive review by Walton of The Moving Picture News states, "[It is a] tale of deep, sterling, human interest. The whole plot is so simple, so refreshingly lucid and pure. We cannot criticize this film any more than a man could analyze mother love. There is a tenderness - and pathos - that is as a nimbus to the whole. The acting of the blind girl, natural, and exquisite, and of her little sister is sweetly innocent. We saw this film twice, on the day of release, in different theatres, and in each case large audiences were touched - and also highly amused by the little girl in the carriage. A sweeter, purer, human-interest tale has not been put on the curtain. The prayer scene deserves to be limned by a master hands that lesson to our children's children. Had we space we could tell the comments of men and women on this production. One thing may be said and that is, all saw and realized the pathos, the beauty and the triumph of the work. Had the film been acted in a theatre we feel certain the audience, with ourselves, with one acclaim would have declared these two orphan girls as manifestations, in the hour of need, of the highest and best emotions of the race!" The Moving Picture World's reviewer was also positive and concluded that, "Such films are helpful because they make nearly despairing men sometimes hopeful, and as long as hope lasts there is opportunity for achievement." Even the reviewer of The New York Dramatic Mirror offered praise for Marie Eline's acting ability in particular, but found no fault with the production itself. Bowers notes that the Mirror was not without its detractors and was accused of being a tool of the Edison Trust companies, but reviews for Thanhouser films were amongst the most perceptive.

== See also ==
- List of American films of 1910
