= The Restoration (1910 film) =

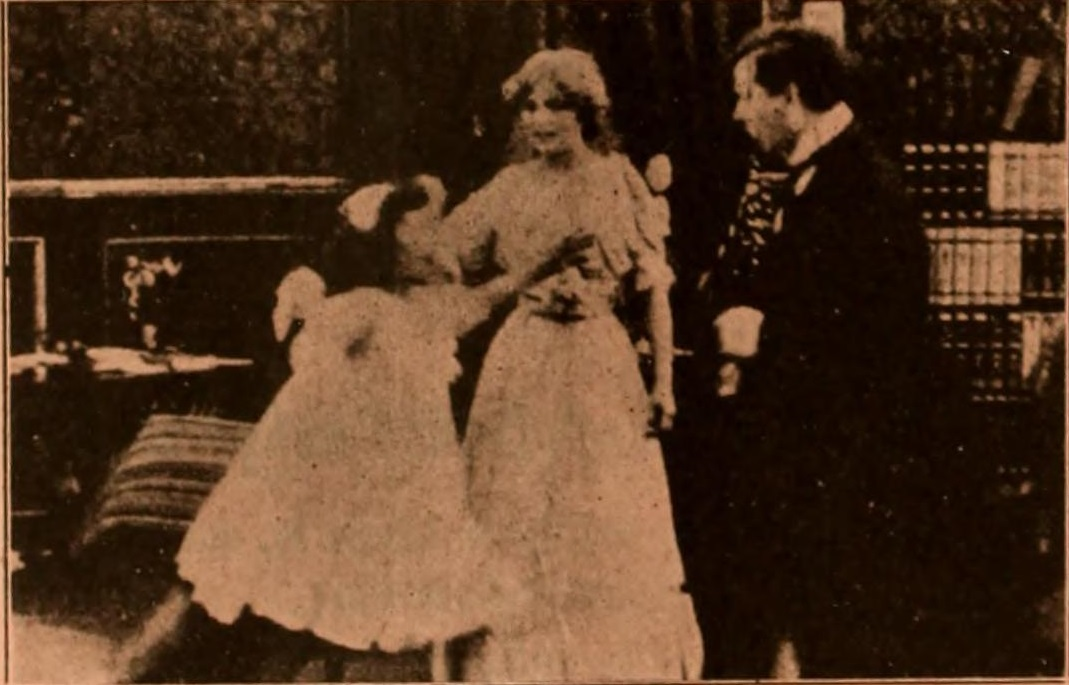
- A surviving film still
- Produced by: Thanhouser Company
- Release date: August 5, 1910
- Country: United States
- Languages: Silent film English intertitles

The Restoration is a 1910 American silent short drama produced by the Thanhouser Company. The film focuses on Hugh Logan, a single father who leaves his little girl, May, at home when he goes on a business trip. On the way to the city he is attacked by robbers and left in the road. He is found and taken in, but he suffers from amnesia. He falls in love with Maud Neals and proposes to her. Due to the prolonged absence of her father, May is taken to an orphan asylum, but she escapes. May goes to the city and ends up stopping to sleep on the doorstep of the Neals' home. Maud finds her and takes her in, where Logan recognizes his daughter and his memory comes back. Little is known of the production credits, but the film does feature Marie Eline as the little girl. It was released on August 5, 1910 and was met with mixed reviews. The film is presumed lost.

== Plot ==
Though the film is presumed lost, a synopsis survives in The Moving Picture World from August 6, 1910. It states: "Hugh Logan is a widower who lives with his only child, a little girl, in a small cottage in the country. Logan is a commercial traveler and, as the play opens, is preparing to leave on a business trip. He takes the train to the city, where he is attacked by footpads, who leave him unconscious in the roadway. He is found by Maud Neal and her father, who are passing in an auto, and they take him into their home. There he revives, but the shock has affected his memory, and he is unable to recall anything of his past life. The kindly Neal secures him employment, and as time passes Logan falls deeply in love with Maud. He finally proposes to her and it is accepted. In the meantime, little May has been waiting in vain for her father. As no word is received from him, and she has no other relatives, Bridget, the servant, takes her to the orphan asylum, where she is compelled to make her home with other little unfortunates. May dislikes the place. In the end she escapes from it. But, gaining the city, she gets lost there and, tired and hungry, goes to sleep on a doorstep - the Neals'. There she is found by Maud, who takes her into the house. Maud is much attracted by the child's charms and finally decides that she must never be parted from her. She tells Logan of her decision and he objects. They quarrel. Feeling himself in the wrong, Logan returns and asks Maud's pardon. He meets May, who recognizes her father. At the sight of her, his memory returns. Speedily he determines to retain May from out of the things of the old life, and Maud from out of the new."

== Production ==
The writer of the scenario is unknown, but it was most likely Lloyd Lonergan. He was an experienced newspaperman employed by The New York Evening World while writing scripts for the Thanhouser productions. Lonergan liked to use the deus ex machina dramatic technique in the conclusion of the plots and this production was no exception. The film director is unknown, but it may have been Barry O'Neil. Film historian Q. David Bowers does not attribute a cameraman for this production, but at least two possible candidates exist. Blair Smith was the first cameraman of the Thanhouser company, but he was soon joined by Carl Louis Gregory who had years of experience as a still and motion picture photographer. The role of the cameraman was uncredited in 1910 productions. The only cast credit claimed by Bowers is that of Marie Eline as the little girl. Bowers states that most of the credits are fragmentary for 1910 Thanhouser productions. Known and more prominent members of the cast to appear in productions include the leading ladies, Anna Rosemond and Violet Heming, and the leading man was Frank H. Crane.

== Release and reception ==
The single reel drama, approximately 1000 feet long, was released on August 5, 1910. Curiously, The Moving Picture World makes a reference to aphasia instead of amnesia in advertising the film, "The Friday release (August 5) is a gripping heart-drama, by name The Restoration. It is a curious, a novel thing; in a sense a study in aphasia - one of those weird plots you expect a Thanhouser picture to unfold." The film likely had a wide national release as evidenced by numerous advertisements, including theaters in Maryland, Indiana, and Kansas. Some advertisements for The Restoration were not specific and may refer to D. W. Griffith's 1909 The Restoration. These advertisements are noted in Oregon, Washington, and North Carolina.

The film received mixed reviews, but also criticism for several aspects of the production. The Morning Telegraph stated, "The photography at the beginning of the film is poor. It seems queer that the child should be able to escape from the orphan asylum in such an easy manner and that no search be made by the institution. It seemed very theatrical and hardly possible that the child should make the first stop at the house of the father's intended. Why did not the producer have the child make a few more stops or have something happen to her instead of making the first stop at the woman's house?" The Moving Picture World spared little coverage of the actual film in its review, noting that the emotional story might be a plausible. The New York Dramatic Mirror gave a detailed review that found the acting favorable, but found the plot and its resolution to be fantastical by stating, "The manifest absurdity of this plot lies in the adoption. No girl just betrothed would ever adopt a runaway orphan."

== See also ==
- List of American films of 1910
