= Oh, What a Night =

Oh, What a Night may refer to:

== Film ==
- Oh, What a Night! (1926 film), an American silent film
- Oh, What a Night (1935 film), a British comedy film
- Oh, What a Night (1944 film), an American crime drama film
- Oh, What a Night (1992 film), a Canadian teen romantic comedy film

== Music ==
- "Oh, What a Night" (The Dells song), 1956, re-released 1969
- "Oh What a Night" (Guano Apes song), 2011
- "December, 1963 (Oh, What a Night)", a song by the Four Seasons, 1975
- "Oh What a Night", a song by Elle Varner from Perfectly Imperfect, 2012
- "Oh, What a Night", a song by the Monkees from Justus, 1996
- "Oh, What a Night", a song by Status Quo from If You Can't Stand the Heat..., 1978

== See also ==
- Oh, What a Knight!, a 1910 American silent short film
- Oh What a Knight, a 1928 cartoon short featuring Oswald the Lucky Rabbit
- Oh, What a Knight!, a 1937 short film featuring Herman Bing
- What a Night (disambiguation)
