= What a Night =

What a Night may refer to:

== Film ==
- What a Night! (1928 film), an American silent film starring Bebe Daniels
- What a Night! (1931 film), a British comedy crime film directed by Monty Banks
- What a Night! (1958 film), a Hungarian comedy film

== Music ==
- What a Night (Tom Jones album), 1977, or the title song
- What a Night! A Christmas Album, a 2008 album by Harry Connick, Jr., or the title song
- "What a Night" (Kat DeLuna song), 2016
- "What a Night" (Loveable Rogues song), 2013
- "What a Night", 1978 song by City Boy
- "What a Night", 1987 song by Dolly Dots
- "What a Night", 2022 song by Flo Rida
- "What a Night", 1961 song by Johnny Chester
- "December, 1963 (Oh, What a Night)", by the Four Seasons

== See also ==
- Oh, What a Night (disambiguation)
