= When the Desert Calls =

1922 film

- Directed by: Ray C. Smallwood
- Written by: Donald McGibney (story); Georgette Duchesne; Peter Milne
- Starring: Violet Heming; Robert Frazer; Huntley Gordon
- Cinematography: Mike Joyce
- Edited by: George McGuire
- Production company: Pyramid Pictures
- Distributed by: American Releasing Corporation
- Release date: October 8, 1922
- Running time: 60 minutes
- Country: United States
- Languages: Silent; English intertitles

When the Desert Calls is a 1922 American silent drama film directed by Ray C. Smallwood and starring Violet Heming, Robert Frazer and Huntley Gordon.

== Cast ==
- Violet Heming as Louise Caldwell
- Robert Frazer as Eldred Caldwell / George Stevenson
- Sheldon Lewis as Richard Manners
- Huntley Gordon as Dr. Thorpe
- J. Barney Sherry as Lt. Col. Potter
- David Wall as Frank Warren, U.S. Consul
- Julia Swayne Gordon as The White Angel
- Nick Thompson as Nazim
- Tammany Young as British Tommy

== Bibliography ==
- Connelly, Robert B. The Silents: Silent Feature Films, 1910-36, Volume 40, Issue 2. December Press, 1998.
- Munden, Kenneth White. The American Film Institute Catalog of Motion Pictures Produced in the United States, Part 1. University of California Press, 1997.
