= The Little Fire Chief =

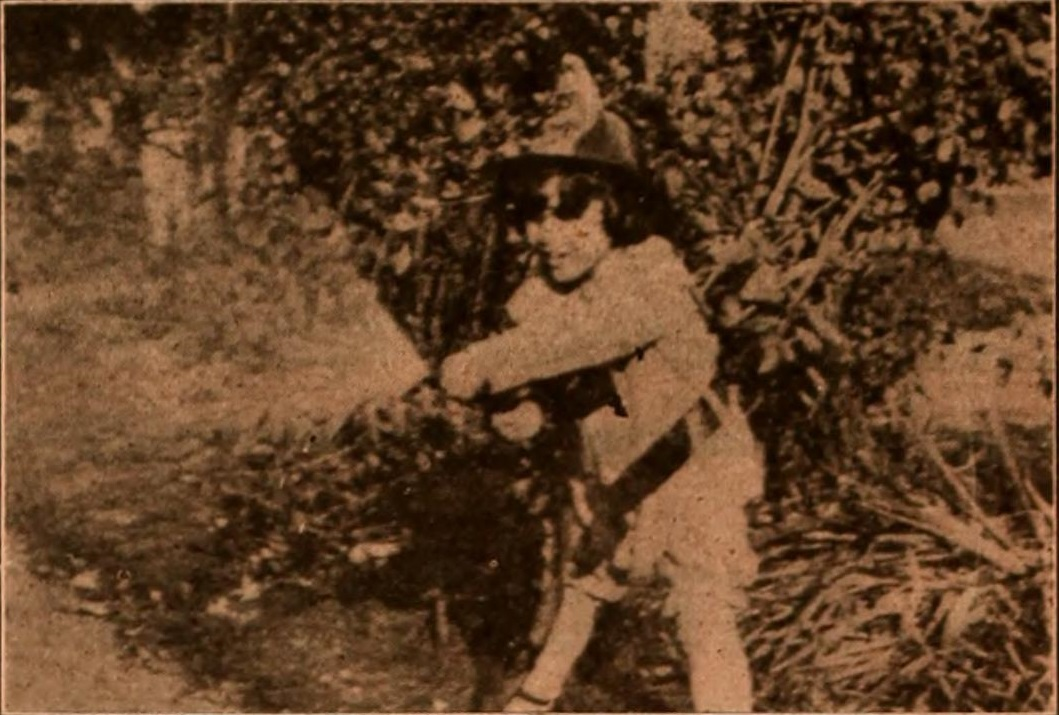
- Marie Eline as the "little fire chief" Willie Stone
- Produced by: Thanhouser Company
- Distributed by: Motion Picture Distributing and Sales Company
- Release date: November 8, 1910
- Country: United States
- Languages: Silent film English intertitles

The Little Fire Chief is a 1910 American silent short comedy produced by the Thanhouser Company. The film focuses on a young boy, Willie Stone, who follows a parade of firemen and attempts to join them as their leader. The firemen find it humorous and allow him to play with them. The fire alarm sounds and Willie attempts to join them, but is too slow. On their way back, Willie holds them up and his sister appears. A fireman named Jack, who has affections for the woman, convinces Willie to be relieved of his "command" by promising to call him later. Marie Eline played the role of Willie Stone, but the other two credits are claimed to have been William Garwood and Mignon Anderson. The rest of the cast and credits are unknown. The film was released on November 8, 1910, and does not appear to have had any reviews in the usual trade publications. The film was advertised nationally and was claimed to have been popular in Vancouver, British Columbia, Canada. The film is presumed lost.

== Plot ==
Though the film is presumed lost, a synopsis survives in The Moving Picture World from October 29, 1910. It states: "Willie Stone is only six years old, but he yearns to be a fireman. He is much impressed with the parade of firemen he sees in his hometown, so much so in fact that he basely deserts his sister on the streets to follow the 'smoke eaters.' (Note: Slang for firefighters. Dictionary.com credits this slang term has originating in 1925-1930, but this predates it by more than a decade.) But Willie is only a little boy, and despite his enthusiasm, he is soon weary and footsore. His plight, added to his tears, attracts the attention of a kindly fireman who is driving with his engine back to quarters. The lad's discomfort is soon forgotten, for the fireman gives him a ride back to the engine house. There Willie gravely applies to the captain for a position on the uniformed force, and is jokingly accepted. But he does not see the humor in it and follows the other men to the bunkroom, where he takes part in their sports."

"But in the midst of the happiest day of his life, an alarm is sounded, and the firemen hastily slide down the pole to their duty. The new fireman, however, is not the kind to be deserted. Grabbing the helmet, the insignia of his office, he follows the others, but it is too late to go to the fire. He arrives in time to hold them up on their way back, but is captured by his weeping sister. He does not wish to leave his command, but his friend, fireman Jack Allen, finally induces him to go on the promise that he, Jack, will call later. Perhaps one reason Jack is so accommodating is because he likes [his] sister. Jack pays ardent court to her, and the flame of their affection[s] resists all of young Willie's efforts to put it out. He didn't really mean to try, but he assuredly poured cold water on Jack, for it was in the line of what he regarded as his duty."

== Cast ==
- Marie Eline as Willie Stone
- William Garwood as Jack Allen (unconfirmed)
- Mignon Anderson as Willie Stone's sister (unconfirmed)

In December 1912, a notice in The Monroe News-Star announced the showing of this film and also gave the key roles of the players. Though the credits cannot be confirmed, the "Thanhouser Kid" (Marie Eline), William Garwood and Mignon Anderson were given as the featured players. This would indicate that Garwood played Jack Allen and the sister was played by Anderson if the information is accurate.

== Production ==
The writer of the scenario is unknown, but it was most likely Lloyd Lonergan. He was an experienced newspaperman employed by The New York Evening World while writing scripts for the Thanhouser productions. The film director is unknown, but it may have been Barry O'Neil or Lucius J. Henderson. Cameramen employed by the company during this era included Blair Smith, Carl Louis Gregory, and Alfred H. Moses, Jr. though none are specifically credited. The role of the cameraman was uncredited in 1910 productions. The cast credits for this production are fragmentary like many 1910 Thanhouser productions. In late 1910, the Thanhouser company released a list of the important personalities in their films. The list includes G.W. Abbe, Justus D. Barnes, Frank H. Crane, Irene Crane, Marie Eline, Violet Heming, Martin J. Faust, Thomas Fortune, George Middleton, Grace Moore, John W. Noble, Anna Rosemond, Mrs. George Walters. The role of Willie Stone was played by Marie Eline. This film was another example of Eline cast in the role of a boy. Eline's with the first such credit was as a young Italian boy in The Two Roses. Eline would also star as Hans in The Little Hero of Holland. If the cast information provided by The Monroe News-Star is accurate, it represents the earliest credit of Mignon Anderson for the Thanhouser Company. If it is not, the first known credit for would be four months later in Robert Emmet in March 1911. The film would also be an early credit of William Garwood, who was among the most important actors at Thanhouser. He joined the company in late 1909 and remained until 1911 before returning in 1912. His previous and first credited work with Thanhouser was Jane Eyre.

== Release and reception ==
The single reel comedy, approximately 1,000 feet long was released on November 8, 1910. The film had a wide national release, advertising theaters are known in Montana, Texas, Kansas, South Dakota, Indiana, Pennsylvania, Maryland, Louisiana, and Missouri. The film was also shown in Vancouver, British Columbia, Canada by the Province Theatre.

Bowers does not cite any trade publication reviews for this film, making it unlikely that the film was given attention in The New York Dramatic Mirror, The Moving Picture World or The Moving Picture News publications. The film was apparently a success at the Province Theater when it was shown in Vancouver. It is possible that non-advertisement reviews of the film may exist in other publications.

== See also ==
- List of American films of 1910
