= Martin Faust (actor) =

American actor (1886–1943)

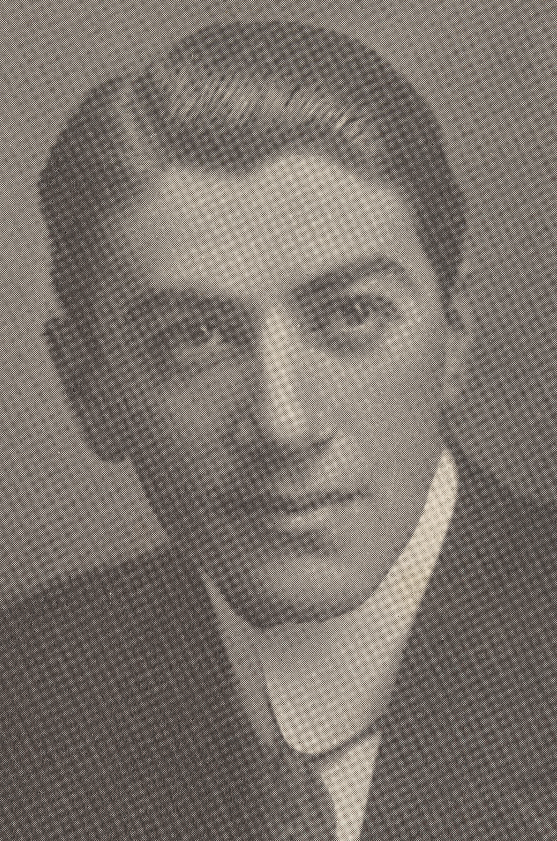
- Faust ca. 1910s
- Born: January 16, 1886; Poughkeepsie, New York, United States
- Died: July 19, 1943 (aged 57); Los Angeles, California, United States
- Occupation: Actor
- Years active: 1910–1944

Martin Faust (January 16, 1886 – July 19, 1943) was an American film actor. He appeared in more than 100 films between 1910 and 1944. He was born in Poughkeepsie, New York and died in Los Angeles, California.

== Selected filmography ==
- Little Boy Blue (1912)
- Chelsea 7750 (1913)
- Lena Rivers (1914)
- A Yellow Streak (1915)
- The Kiss of Hate (1916)
- The Child of Destiny (1916)
- Notorious Gallagher (1916)
- The Dawn of Love (1916)
- Wife Number Two (1917)
- The Blue Streak (1917)
- Thou Shalt Not Steal (1917)
- The Cambric Mask (1919)
- The Face in the Fog (1922)
- The Silent Command (1923)
- The Tents of Allah (1923)
- Yolanda (1924)
- I Am the Man (1924)
- North Star (1925)
- High Speed (1932)
- Charlie Chan in Paris (1935)
- The Great Hotel Murder (1935)
- Heir to Trouble (1935)
- Saddlemates (1941)
