= John W. Noble =

American screenwriter (1880–1946)

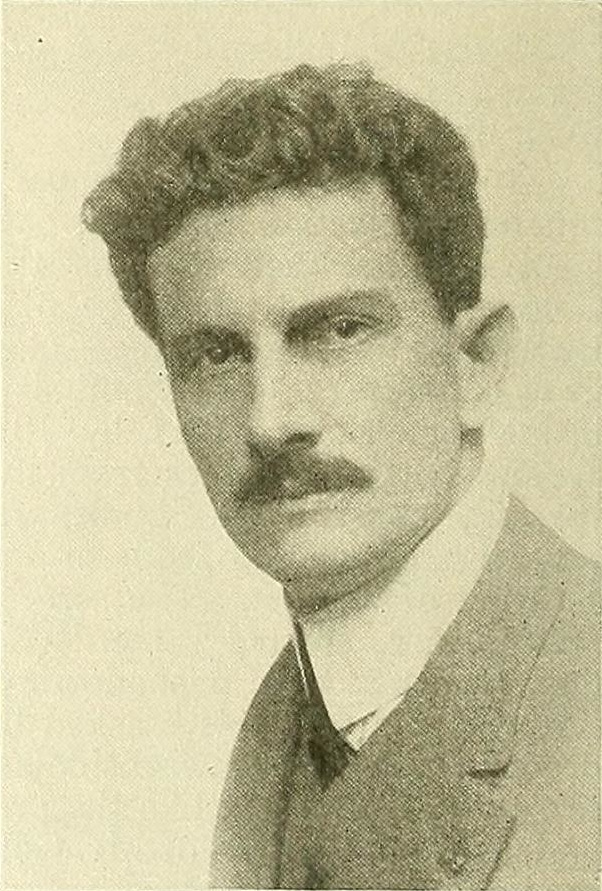
- Born: Winfield Fernley Kutz; June 24, 1880; Pottstown, Pennsylvania, US
- Died: September 10, 1946 (aged 66); Pottstown, Pennsylvania, US
- Occupations: Film director, screenwriter
- Years active: 1910–1927
- Spouse: Iva Barbour

John Winthrop Noble (born Winfield Fernley Kutz; June 24, 1880 – September 10, 1946) was an American film director and screenwriter during the silent era.

== Career ==
John Winthrop Noble was the professional name of Winfield Fernley Kutz (sometimes given as Fernley Winfield Kutz), born June 24, 1880, in Pottsville, Pennsylvania. (Note: Noble's December 1924 passport application states that "Fernley Winfield Kutz [is] professionally known as John Winthrop Noble". His birthplace is given as Pottstown, Pennsylvania.) (Note: Some sources state that John W. Noble was born in Albemarle County, Virginia, and omit his birth name—information derived from Noble's biography on page 194 of the 1919 Motion Picture Studio Directory.) He worked in various capacities with the Thanhouser Company from 1910 to 1912, assisting director Lucius J. Henderson and appearing in films including The Baseball Bug (1911) and The Poacher (1912). He worked briefly for Solax Studios, formed the short-lived Ryno Film Company with Clarkson Potter Ryttenberg in 1913, and directed films for the Ramo Company. In December 1913 he joined the staff of D. W. Griffith and became a director for the Mutual Film Corporation. Noble also worked for studios including the B. A. Rolfe Company (1914–16), Biograph Studios, Universal Pictures, Metro Pictures and Goldwyn Pictures.

Called and later credited as Jack Noble, he was known as Fernley Kutz at the time of his death September 10, 1946, at his home in Pottstown.

== Partial filmography ==
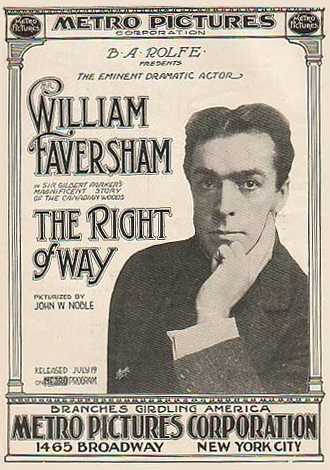
Ad for The Right of Way (1915)

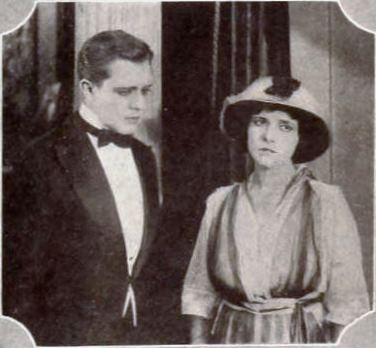
Niles Welch and Zena Keefe in Shame (1917)

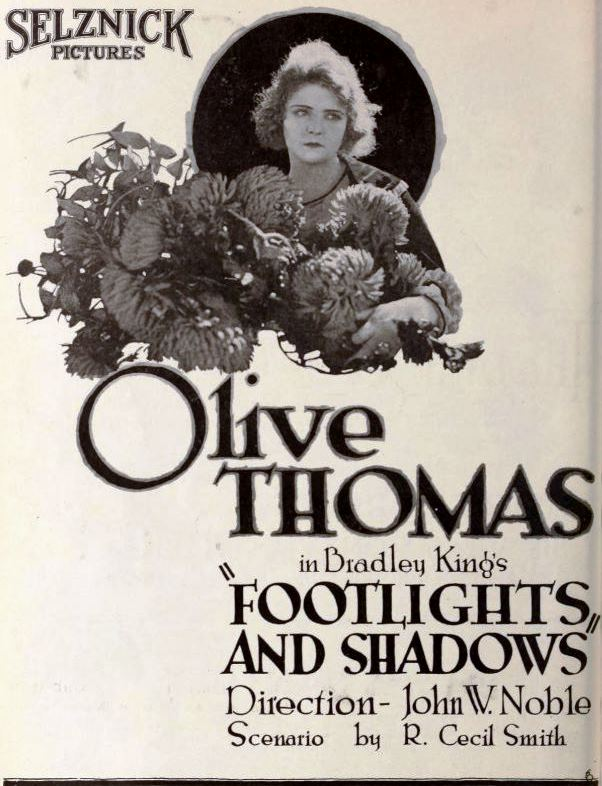
Ad for Footlights and Shadows (1920)

Year	Title	Notes
1911	The Baseball Bug	
1914	The Three of Us	
1915	Black Fear	Also screenwriter
1915	Satan Sanderson	
1915	The High Road	
1915	Fighting Bob	
1915	One Million Dollars	
1916	The Bigger Man	
1916	The Right of Way	
1916	The Brand of Cowardice	
1916	Man and His Soul	
1916	The Red Mouse	
1916	A Million a Minute	
1916	Romeo and Juliet	Also screenwriter
1916	The Awakening of Helena Richie	Also screenwriter
1916	The Wall Between	
1917	The Call of Her People	
1917	Shame	Also screenwriter
1917	The Power of Decision	
1917	A Magdalene of the Hills	
1917	Sunshine Alley	
1917	The Beautiful Lie	
1918	The Birth of a Race	Also producer, screenwriter
1918	My Own United States	
1919	The Gray Towers Mystery	Also screenwriter
1919	The Golden Shower	
1920	The Song of the Soul	Also screenwriter
1920	Footlights and Shadows	
1922	Cardigan	
1924	His Darker Self	
1926	Lightning Reporter	Also screenwriter
1927	Burning Gold	
