= Violet Heming =

English actress

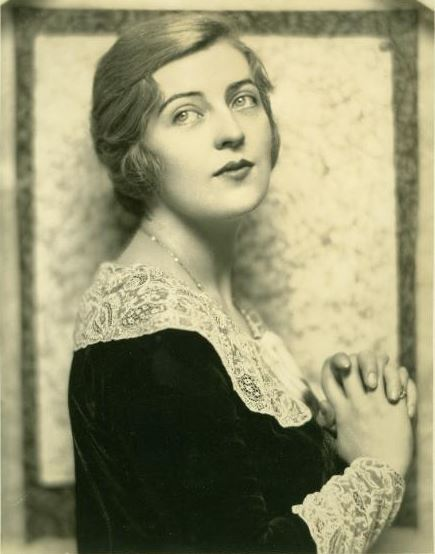
- Heming in 1921
- Born: Violet Hemming; 27 January 1895; Leeds, Yorkshire, England
- Died: 4 July 1981 (aged 86); New York City, U.S.
- Occupation: Actress
- Years active: 1908–1955
- Spouses: Grant Mills; Bennett Champ Clark

Violet Heming (27 January 1895 – 4 July 1981) was an English stage and screen actress. Her name sometimes appeared as Violet Hemming in newspapers.

== Biography ==
Born Violet Hemming in Leeds, Yorkshire, she was the daughter of Alfred Hemming - who appeared in silent films - and Mabel Allen.

Heming began a stage career in 1908, appearing as Carrie Crews in Fluffy Ruffles. In 1917 she created the title role in the premiere of Frederick J. Jackson's Losing Eloise (later retitled The Naughty Wife) at Broadway's Harris Theatre. She appeared in her first motion picture, a short film for Thanhouser Film Company, in 1910. In 1913, she appeared with George Arliss in the play Disraeli.

In September 1925, Variety reported that Heming would appear in a "playlet" for the De Forest Phonofilm sound-on-film system.

Heming starred as the lead in The Getaway, a play written by Charles King Van Riper, which appeared at Nixon's Apollo Theatre in Atlantic City, New Jersey in September 1926. Two reviews appeared in Variety one saying "Most of the success of The Getaway is due to the superb work of Miss Heming and a well selected cast."

Though Heming appeared in several films and television throughout the decades, she is best remembered as a dependable Broadway star with a long list of theatrical credits.

She died in New York City on 4 July 1981, and was buried at Arlington National Cemetery.

== Partial filmography ==
- The Woman Hater (1910 short)
- Tempest and Sunshine (1910 short)
- Lena Rivers (1910 short)
- The Mermaid (1910)
- Paul and Virginia (1910 film)
- The Running Fight (1915), extant in the Library of Congress
- The Danger Trail (1917)
- The Turn of the Wheel (1918)
- The Common Cause (1919)
- Everywoman (1919)
- The Cost (1920)
- When the Desert Calls (1922)
- The Knife (1929 short), made in Fox Movietone
- The Man Who Played God (1932)
- Almost Married (1932)
