= Motion Picture Distributing and Sales Company =

The Motion Picture Distributing and Sales Company was a major, national motion picture distribution company which operated in the United States between May 31, 1910 and the end of June, 1912. The company distributed almost 2,200 silent era motion pictures during its two-year existence. Its product came from the majority of independent American film producers, which hitherto had distributed their product through states' rights franchisees, as well as a handful of small, independent national distributors, all of whom opposed the attempted monopoly of distribution by the General Film Company, which was a subsidiary of Edison's Motion Picture Patents Company.

Both Universal Pictures and the Mutual Film Corporation grew out of the Motion Picture Distributing and Sales Company.
