= The Evening World =

American newspaper published in New York City

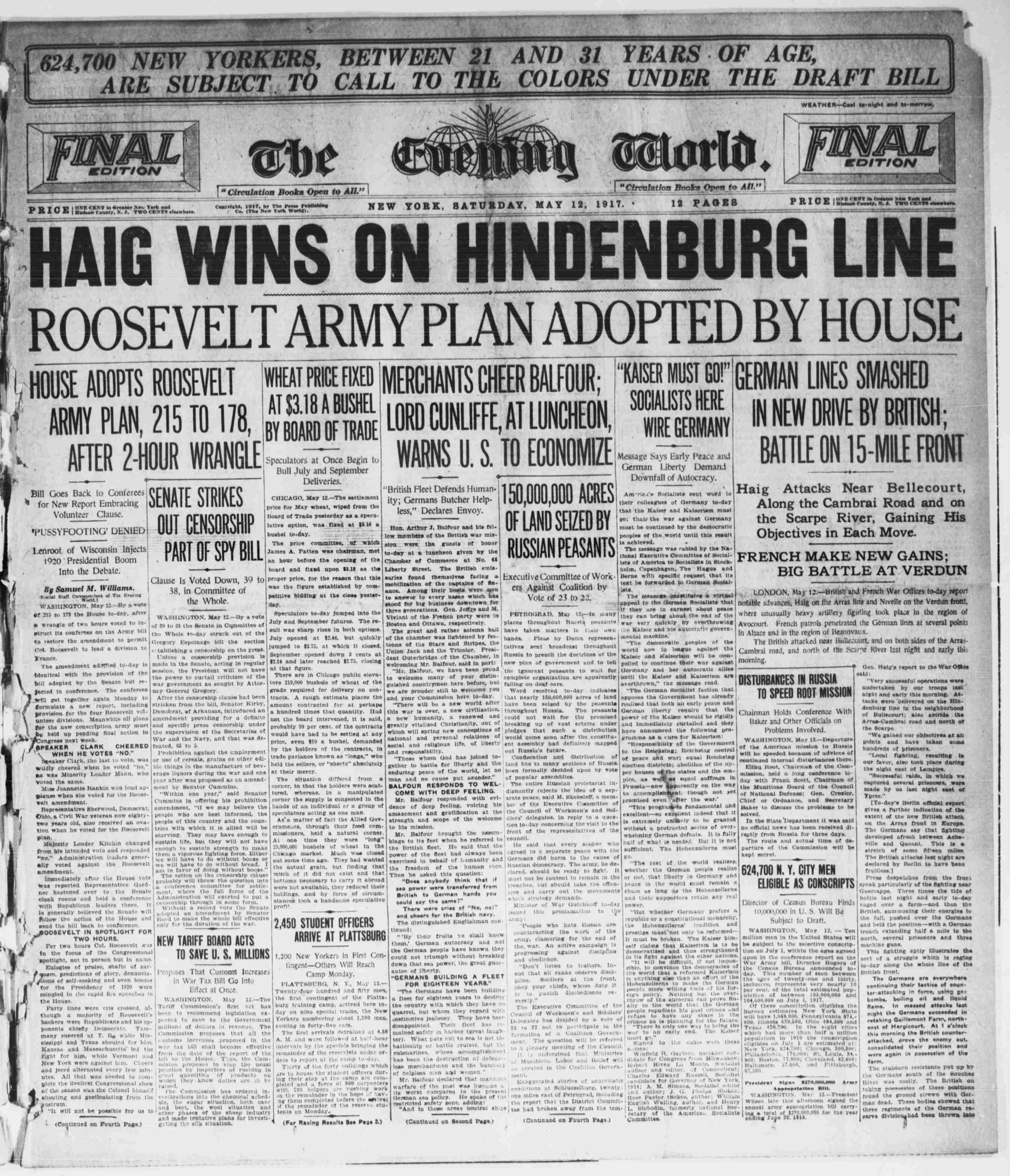
- Front page of The Evening World, May 12, 1917
- Type: Daily newspaper
- Format: Broadsheet
- Founded: October 10, 1887
- Ceased publication: February 26, 1931
- Language: English
- Headquarters: New York City, New York, US

The Evening World was a newspaper that was published in New York City from 1887 to 1931. It was owned by Joseph Pulitzer, and served as an evening edition of the New York World.

== History ==
The first issue was on October 10, 1887. It was published daily, except for Sunday. The final publication was on February 26, 1931. It was merged with the New York World and the New York Telegram and became the New York World-Telegram.

In 1899, The Evening World was the subject of a large-scale newsboy strike, immortalized by the Disney film and stage musical Newsies.

== Staff ==
Nixola Greeley-Smith had worked in St Louis before being based at The Evening World. She covered home front activities during World War I and was an advocate and activist for women's suffrage.
