= Carl Louis Gregory =

American film director

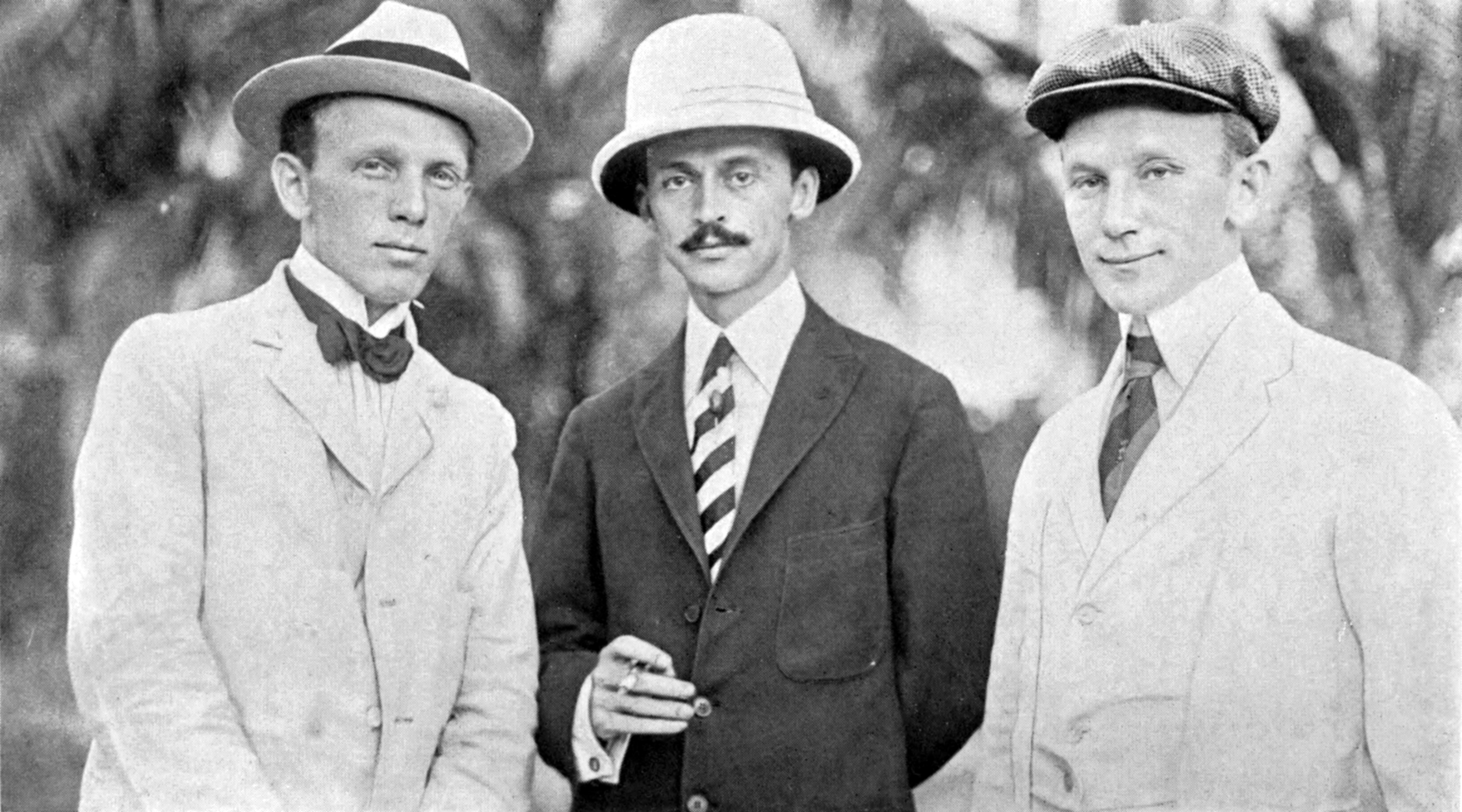
Carl L. Gregory (center) with underwater photography pioneers John E. Williamson (left) and George M. Williamson (1914)

Carl Louis Gregory (1882–1951) was an American cinematographer and director.

== Early life ==
Carl Louis Gregory was born in Walnut, Kansas, in 1882. He ventured into photography while he was 11 years old. He grew up in Geneva, Ohio, the only boy among many sisters, two of whom, Anne (Anna) and Fana (Fanny) would later act in his silent films. He received degrees in pharmacy and chemistry from the Ohio State University in 1902 and 1904, respectively. He worked with Thomas Edison in 1909 shooting and directing silent films, and later left the Thanhouser Company of New Rochelle to head Feature Film Manufacturing Co. in 1912, based on City Island, NY. (The Bioscope, June 27, 1912) He developed an optical printer in 1920 and as a result, his technical expertise was highly valued.

== Career ==
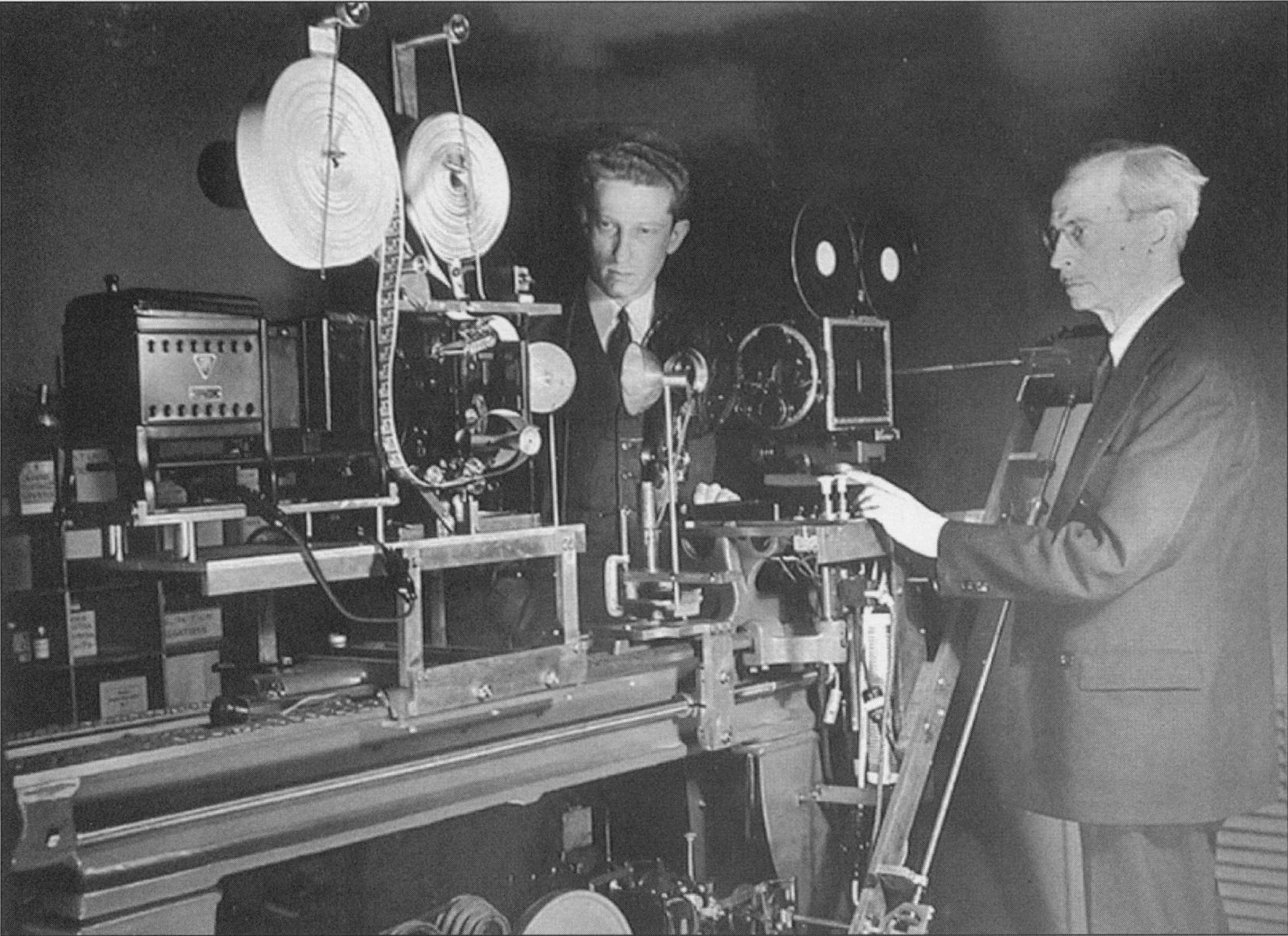
Carl Gregory (right) and Howard Walls copying a paper print roll using an optical printer modified by Gregory, March 1943

Gregory was senior cameraman for the first major Thanhouser release, St. Elmo. He photographed stills for a couple of advertisements. Gregory was the head instructor at the U. S. Signal School of Cinematography at Columbia University. He also filmed the 1914 serial called The Million Dollar Mystery.

He was on the staff at the National Archives from 1936 to 1946. During his tenure there, he modified a process optical printer and was successful in restoring paper prints with simple techniques. In 1946, Gregory was hired by the Library of Congress, which was trying to acquire the film collection of Mary Pickford. Working in California, he created an inventory of Pickford's collection—films in which she had financial interest, and all of the films in which she appeared.

== Death ==
He died on March 6, 1951, at his home in Van Nuys, California.

== Filmography ==
An American in the Making (1913)

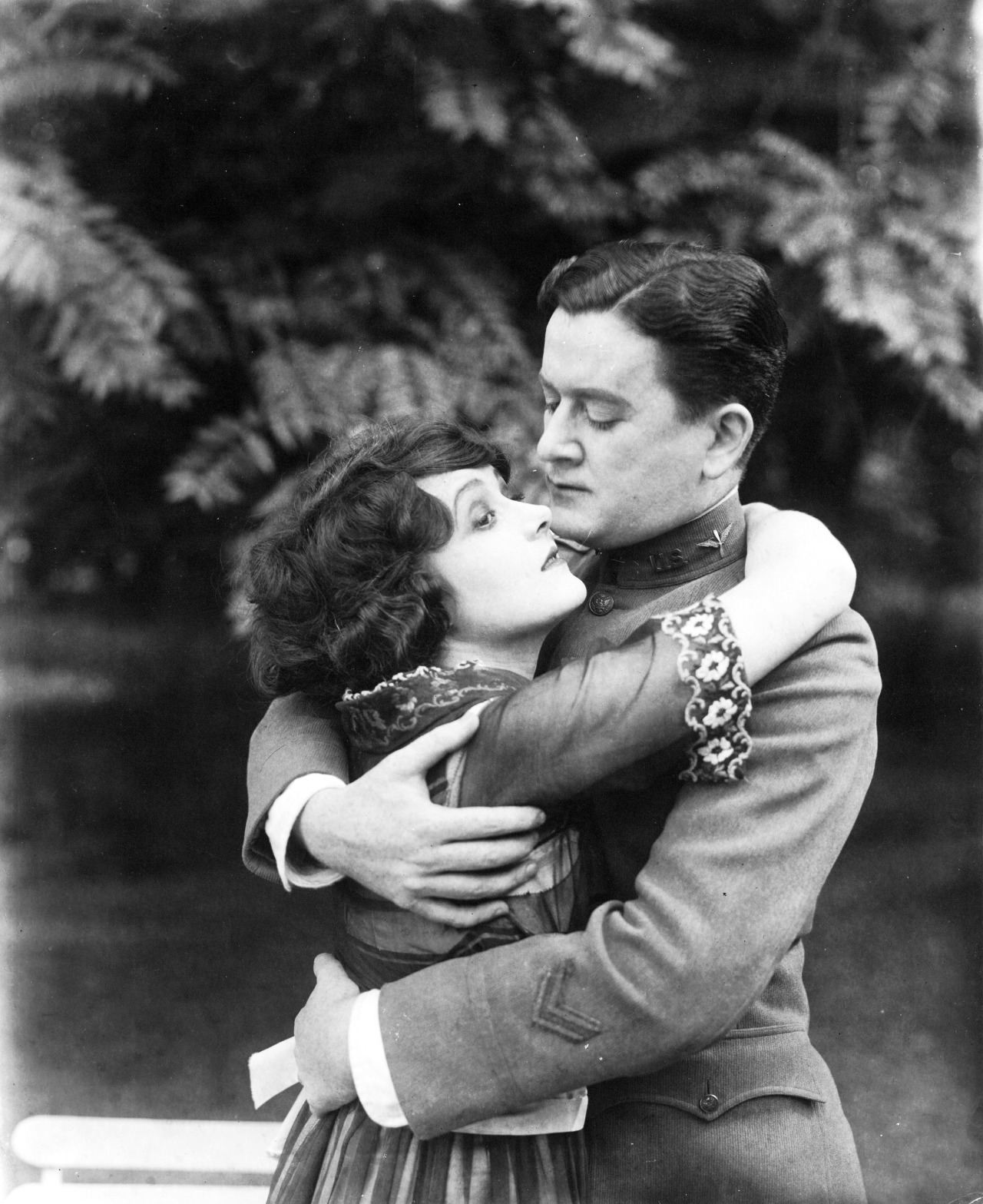
Vivienne Osborne and Thomas Carrigan in Love's Flame (1920)

- Nicholas Nickleby (1912), cinematographer
- The Cry of the Children (1912), cinematographer
- An American in the Making (1913), cinematographer, director
- Her Awakening (1914), director
- The Woman Pays (1914), cinematographer
- An Enemy to Society (1914), cinematographer
- Thirty Leagues Under the Sea (1914) (derived from The Terrors of the Deep), director, cinematographer, screenwriter
- The Patriot and the Spy (1915), cinematographer
- Their One Love (1915), cinematographer
- The Gulf Between (1917), cinematographer
- Queen of the Sea (1918), cinematographer
- Love's Flame (1920), cinematographer, director
- The Fall of the House of Usher (1928), special effects cinematographer
