= List of Thanhouser Company films =

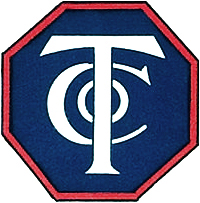

These are the films directed, produced and distributed by the Thanhouser Company, the pioneering American motion picture studio of New Rochelle, New York.

== 1910 ==
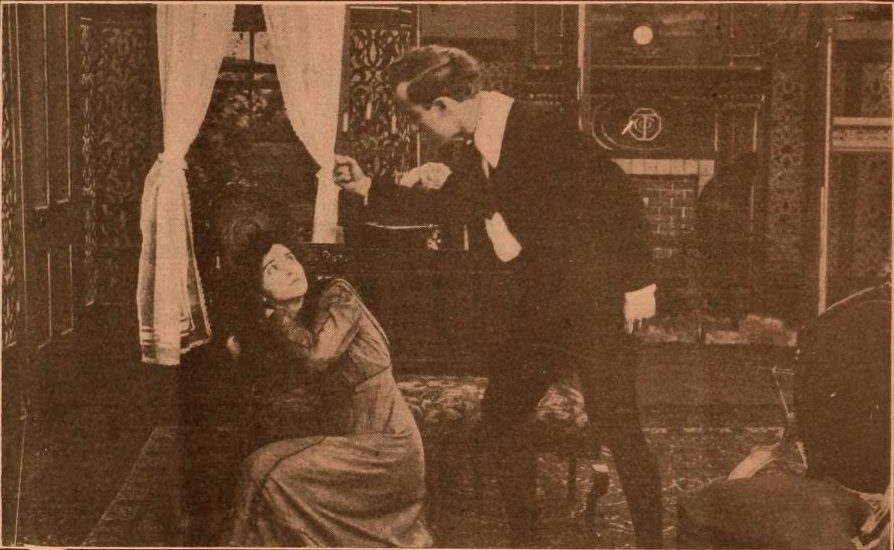
Still from Jane Eyre

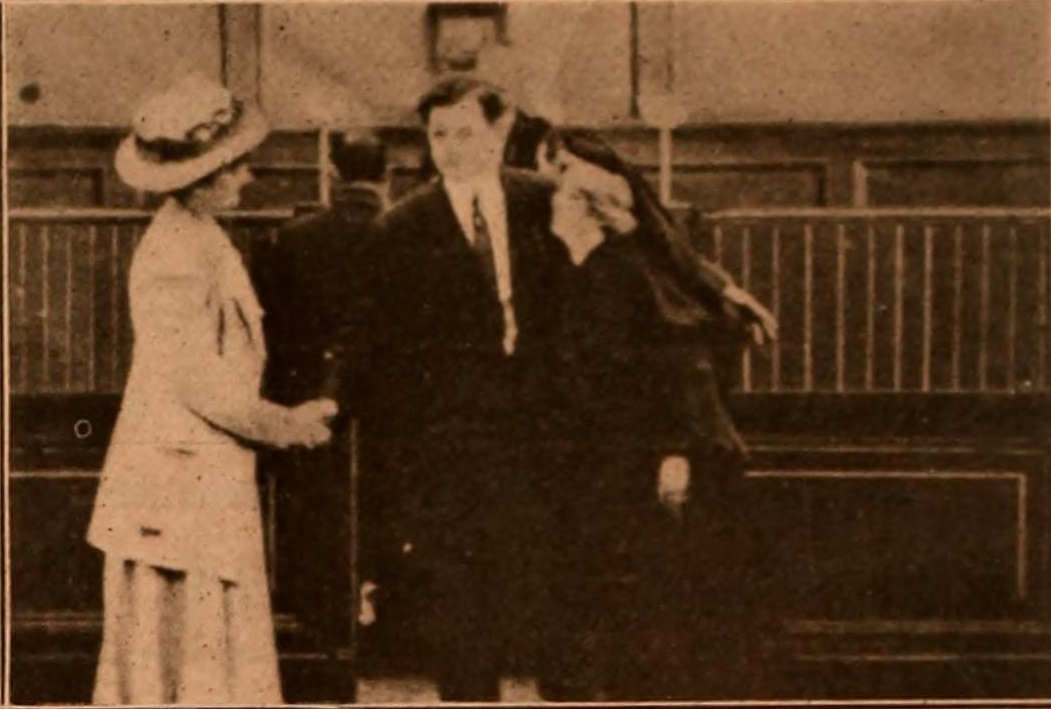
Still from Mother

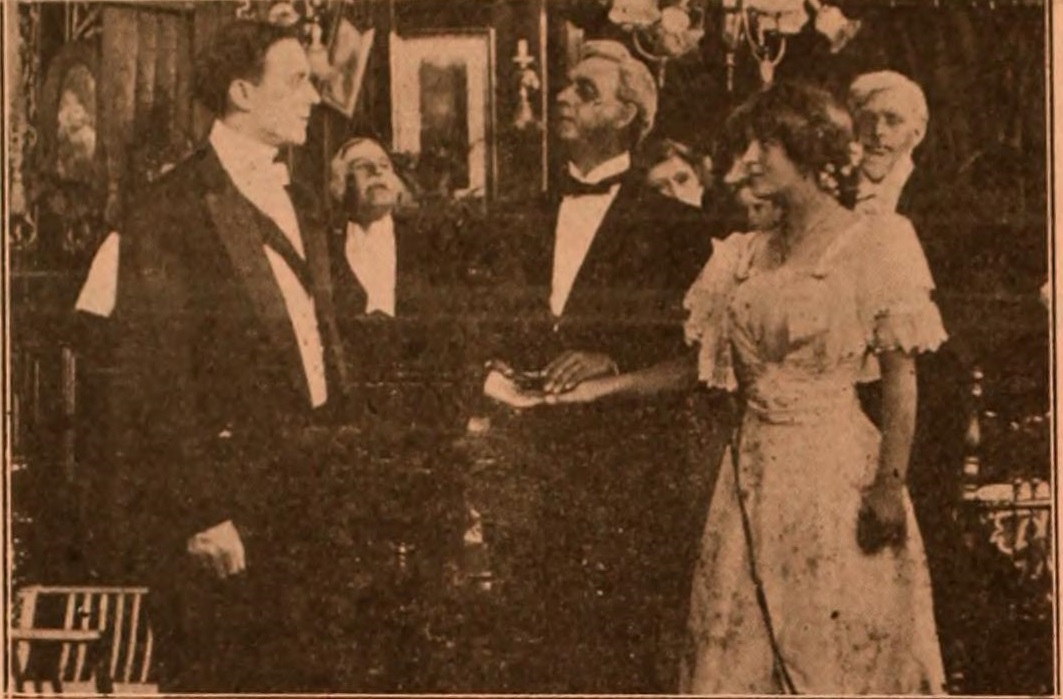
Still from Young Lord Stanley

Play full copy of Daddy's Double

- The Actor's Children
- St. Elmo
- She's Done It Again
- Daddy's Double
- A 29-Cent Robbery
- The Old Shoe Came Back
- Her Battle for Existence
- Sand Man's Cure
- She Wanted to Marry a Hero
- The Cigars His Wife Bought
- Jane Eyre
- The Best Man Wins
- Cupid at the Circus
- The Winter's Tale
- The Girl of the Northern Woods
- The Two Roses
- The Writing on the Wall
- The Woman Hater
- The Little Hero of Holland
- Roosevelt's Return
- Thelma
- The Governor's Daughter
- Tempest and Sunshine
- The Flag of His Country
- Booming Business
- Gone to Coney Island
- The Girl Strike Leader
- The Lucky Shot
- The Converted Deacon
- The Girls of the Ghetto
- The Playwright's Love
- Uncle Tom's Cabin
- The Mermaid
- Jenks' Day Off
- The Restoration
- The Mad Hermit
- Lena Rivers
- The Girl Reporter
- She Stoops to Conquer
- A Dainty Politician
- The Latchkey
- An Assisted Elopement
- A Fresh Start
- Mother
- The Doctor's Carriage
- Tangled Lives
- The Stolen Invention
- Not Guilty
- The Convict
- The Hero's Jealous Wife
- Home Made Mince Pie
- Dots and Dashes
- Leon of the Table D'hote
- Avenged
- Pocahontas
- Delightful Dolly
- Oh, What a Knight!
- Alaska's Adieu to Winter
- Their Child
- Young Lord Stanley
- The Life of a Fireman
- Parade of the Volunteer Firemen of Westchester County and Vicinity
- The Fairies' Hallowe'en
- Mistress and Maid
- Ten Nights in a Bar Room
- The Little Fire Chief
- The American and the Queen
- Paul and Virginia
- The City of Her Dreams
- A Thanksgiving Surprise
- The Wild Flower and the Rose
- Value—Beyond Price
- John Halifax, Gentleman
- Rip Van Winkle
- The Girls He Left Behind Him
- The Iron Clad Lover
- Love and Law
- The Millionaire Milkman
- Looking Forward
- The Childhood of Jack Harkaway
- The Vicar of Wakefield
- Hypnotized

== 1911 ==
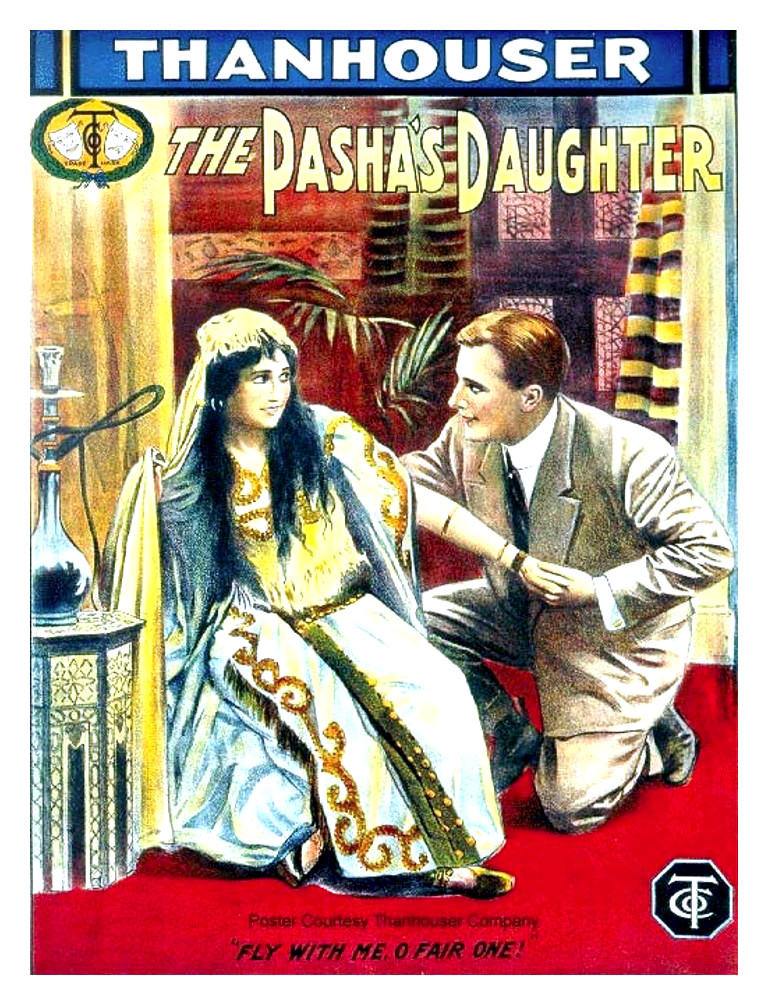
Poster for The Pasha's Daughter

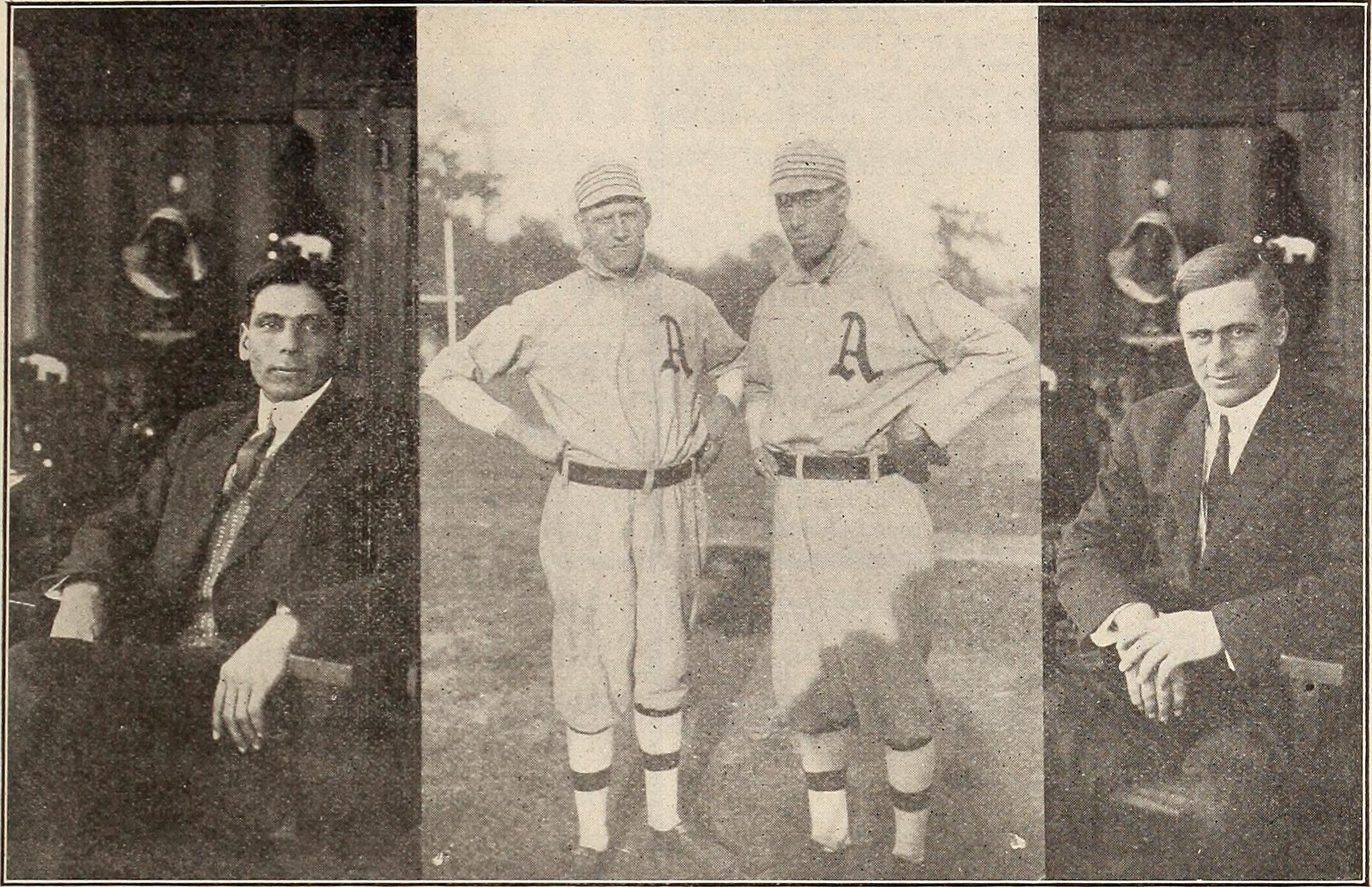
Four stars of the 1911 world champion Philadelphia Athletics, who were featured in The Baseball Bug: (from left) Chief Bender, Cy Morgan, Jack Coombs, and Rube Oldring

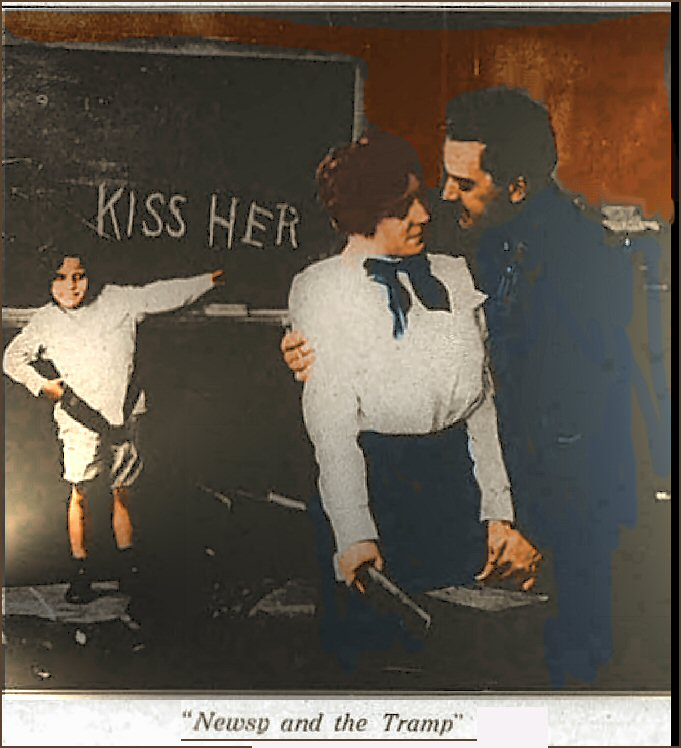
Colorized still from the 1911 film The Newsy and the Tramp

- The Pasha's Daughter
- Baseball and Bloomers
- Everybody Saves Father
- The Only Girl in Camp
- The Vote That Counted
- Bertie's Brainstorm
- The Old Curiosity Shop
- When Love Was Blind
- Prompt Payment
- Stealing a Ride
- Only in the Way
- Adrift
- The Westerner and the Earl
- The Norwood Necklace
- For Her Sake
- Checkmate
- For Washington
- A Newsboy Hero
- The Little Mother
- Stage Struck
- The Mummy
- The Spirit Hand
- His Younger Brother
- Robert Emmet
- Divorce
- Waiting at the Church
- The Tramp
- The Impostor
- Silas Marner
- The Charity of the Poor
- Vindicated
- Velvet and Rags
- Old Home Week
- Cally's Comet
- Weighed in the Balance
- The Poet of The People
- An Elevator Romance
- The Pillars of Society
- The Sinner
- The Railroad Builder
- The Regimental Ball
- The Colonel and the King
- Lady Clare
- The Stage Child
- Get Rich Quick
- A War Time Wooing
- A Circus Stowaway
- The Stepmother
- Motoring
- The Rescue of Mr. Henpeck
- Little Old New York
- Flames and Fortune
- The Coffin Ship
- Foxy Grandma
- Courting Across the Court
- Lorna Doone
- The Declaration of Independence
- The Court's Decree
- When a Man Fears
- Won by Wireless
- That's Happiness
- Two Little Girls
- The Smuggler
- A Doll's House
- Pied Piper of Hamelin
- The Judge's Story
- Back to Nature
- Cupid the Conqueror
- Nobody Loves a Fat Woman
- The Train Despatcher
- The Cross
- The Romance of Lonely Island
- The Moth
- Romeo And Juliet, Part I
- Count Ivan and The Waitress
- Romeo and Juliet, Part II
- The Buddhist Priestess
- In the Chorus
- The Lie
- The Honeymooners
- Young Lochinvar
- Love's Sacrifice
- The Five Rose Sisters
- Austin Flood
- The East and the West
- The Higher Law
- The Tempter And Dan Cupid
- The Early Life of David Copperfield
- The Satyr and The Lady
- Little Em'ly and David Copperfield
- The Jewels of Allah
- The Loves of David Copperfield
- Their Burglar
- The Missing Heir
- The Last of the Mohicans
- The Higher the Fewer
- A Mother's Faith
- A Master of Millions
- The Baseball Bug
- The Tempest
- Beneath the Veil
- The Newsy and the Tramp
- Brother Bob's Baby
- The Lady from the Sea
- Deacon Debbs
- The Tomboy
- Cinderella
- She
- The Expert's Report

== 1912 ==
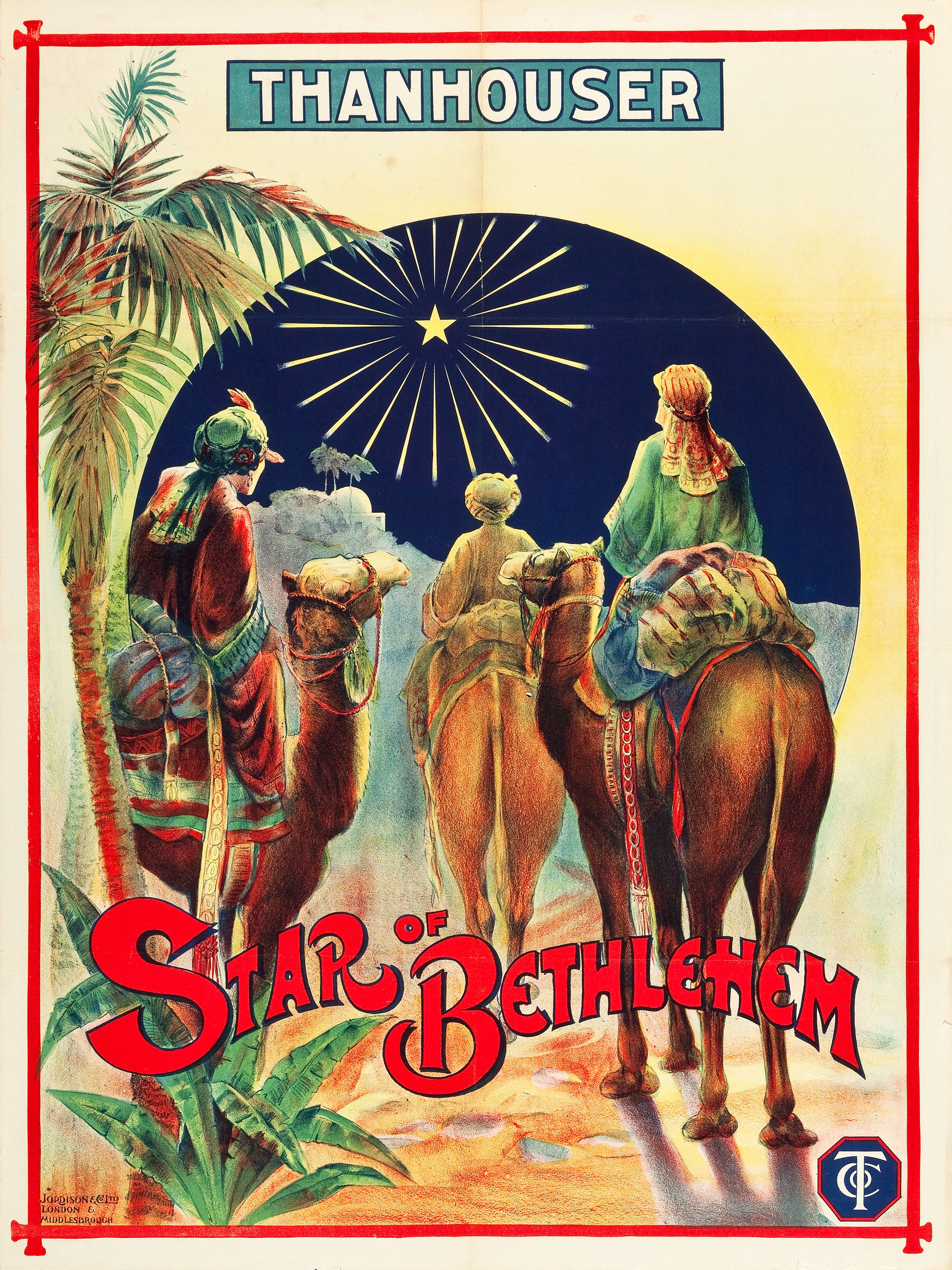
Poster for The Star of Bethlehem

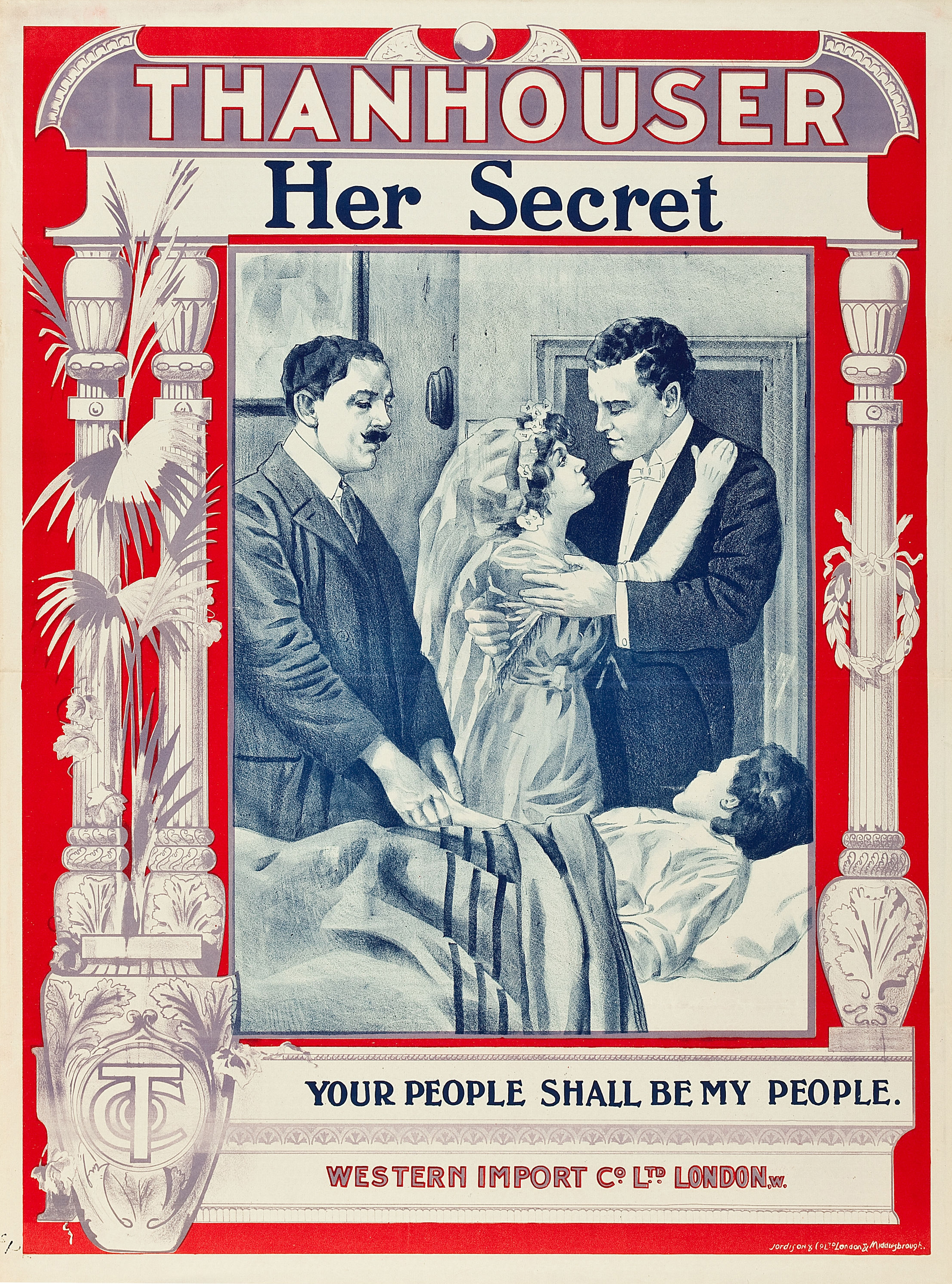
Poster for Her Secret

The Cry of the Children

Dr. Jekyll and Mr. Hyde

- The Passing
- A Columbus Day Conspiracy
- Just a Bad Kid
- The Twelfth Juror
- Dr. Jekyll and Mr. Hyde
- Her Ladyship's Page
- East Lynne
- As It Was in the Beginning
- On Probation
- The Trouble Maker
- The Signal Code
- The Silent Witness
- Surelock Jones, Detective
- Washington in Danger
- The Guilty Baby
- Extravagance
- His Great Uncle's Spirit
- Flying to Fortune
- The Poacher
- My Baby's Voice
- The Star of the Side Show
- Easy Mark
- The Crazy Quilt
- The Baby Bride
- When Mandy Came to Town
- The Cry of the Children
- Dora Thorne
- The Little Shut-In
- Jess—Part 1—A Sister's Sacrifice
- Jess—Part 3—Jess, the Avenger
- Dottie's New Doll
- Her Secret
- On the Stroke of Five
- Why Tom Signed the Pledge
- The Twins
- Called Back
- Farm And Flat
- In Blossom Time
- Old Bess
- The Professor's Son
- Doggie's Debut
- Out of the Dark
- Ma And Dad
- Under Two Flags
- Nursie and the Knight
- The Finger of Scorn
- Vengeance Is Mine
- The Ranchman and the Hungry Bird
- Only a Miller's Daughter
- The Portrait of Lady Anne
- The Merchant of Venice
- Cousins
- Treasure Trove
- A New Cure for Divorce
- One of the Honor Squad
- Baby Hands
- Old Dr. Judd
- Big Sister
- Now Watch the Professor!
- The Wrecked Taxi
- As Others See Us
- Warner's Waxworks
- Her Darkest Hour
- Conductor 786
- When a Count Counted
- Lucile—Parts 1 and 2
- Lucile—Part 3
- The Capture Of New York
- The Voice of Conscience
- His Father's Son
- Don't Pinch My Pup
- A Star Reborn
- Orator, Knight and Cow Charmer
- The Mail Clerk's Temptation
- Two Souls
- At the Foot of the Ladder
- Undine
- But the Greatest of These Is Charity
- Please Help the Pore
- Letters of a Lifetime
- The Warning
- A Six Cylinder Elopement
- Miss Robinson Crusoe
- Specimens from The New York Zoological Park
- Dotty, the Dancer
- When Mercy Tempers Justice
- The Woman in White
- In a Garden
- Mary's Goat
- Taking Care of Baby
- Put Yourself in His Place
- The Little Girl Next Door
- Petticoat Camp
- The Ladder of Life
- Through The Flames
- The Noise Like a Fortune
- The County's Prize Baby
- In Time of Peril
- Frankfurters and Quail
- Cross Your Heart
- The Truant's Doom
- The Thunderbolt
- The Forest Rose
- Standing Room Only
- A Will and a Way
- A Romance of the U.S.N.
- At Liberty—Good Press Agent
- Aurora Floyd
- Brains vs. Brawn
- The Other Half
- The Race
- The Repeater
- The Star of Bethlehem
- A Militant Suffragette
- With the Mounted Police

== 1913 ==
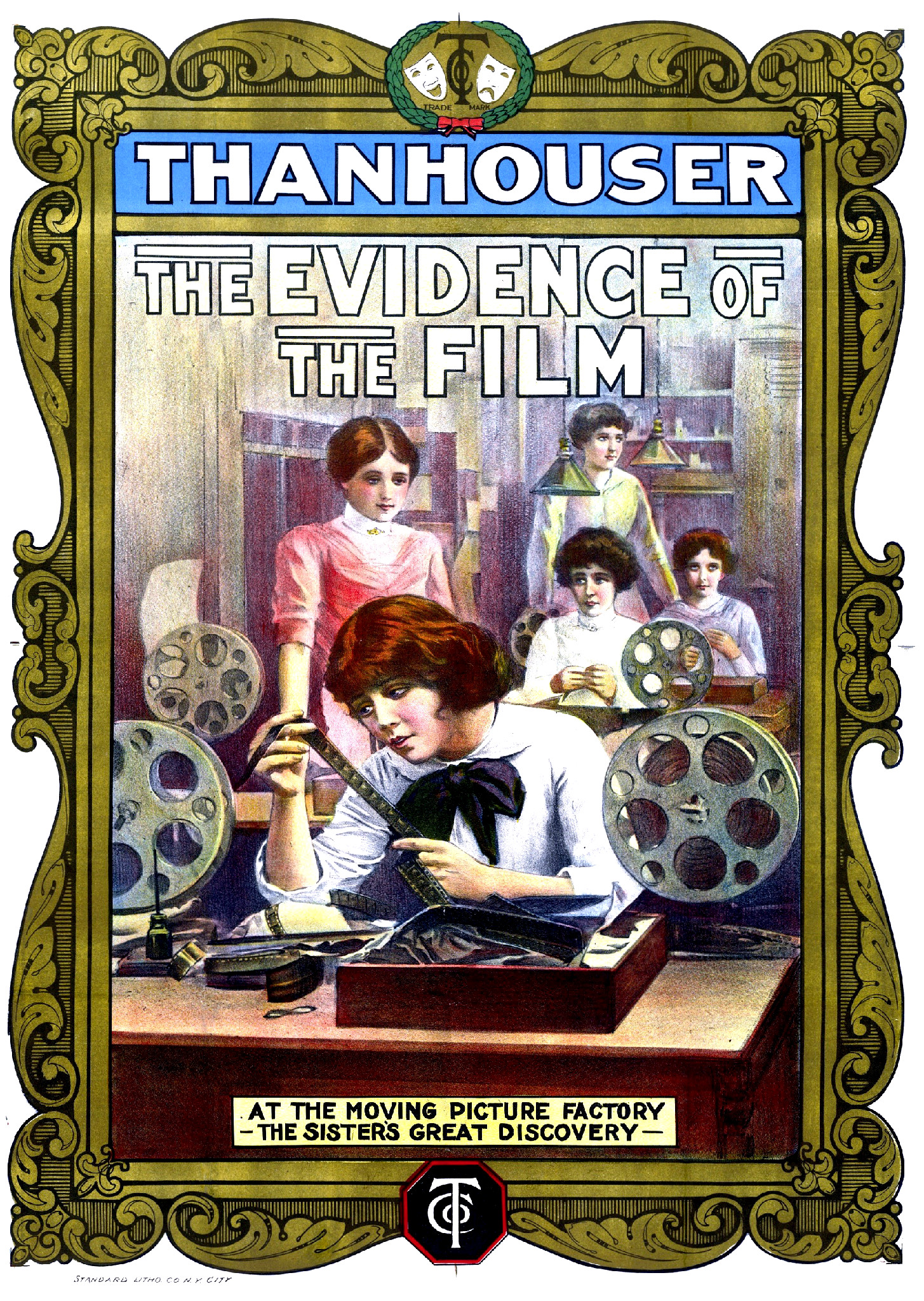
Poster for The Evidence of the Film

- A Poor Relation
- A Guilty Conscience
- The Boomerang
- The Evidence of the Film
- The City Mouse
- The Tiniest of Stars
- Napoleon's Luck Stone
- Some Fools There Were]
- The Commuter's Cat
- Her Fireman
- The Floorwalker's Triumph
- Her Nephews from Labrador
- The Dove in the Eagle's Nest
- Psychology of Fear
- His Uncle's Wives
- When the Studio Burned
- While Mrs. Mc Fadden Looked Out
- Good Morning, Judge
- A Mystery of Wall Street
- Half Way to Reno
- The Two Sisters
- The Ghost in Uniform
- Sherlock Holmes Solves the Sign of the Four
- Inauguration Ceremonies
- Just a Shabby Doll
- Babies Prohibited
- The Heart of a Child
- The Wax Lady
- The Woman Who Did Not Care
- The Spoiled Darling's Doll
- When Ghost Meets Ghost
- The Patriot
- The Changeling
- The Dog in the Baggage Car
- The Girl and the Grafter
- Retribution
- The Children's Conspiracy
- An American in the Making
- For Another's Sin
- Priscilla's Pets
- Rosie's Revenge
- The Girl Detective's Ruse
- Express C.O.D.
- Barred from the Mails
- Marble Heart
- Why Babe Left Home
- A Business Woman
- In Their Hour of Need
- A Pullman Nightmare
- A Victim of Circumstances
- The Caged Bird
- The Runaway
- Miss Mischief
- While Baby Slept
- His Sacrifice
- The Head of the Ribbon Counter
- The Snare of Fate
- The Eye of Krishla
- Forgive Us Our Trespasses
- The Lost Combination
- A Modern Lochinvar
- King René's Daughter
- Her Two Jewels
- For the Man She Loved
- An Errand of Mercy
- A Crepe Bonnet
- Brethren of the Sacred Fish
- When Darkness Came
- The Op of New York
- The Wild Man Willie
- Little Dorrit
- In The Nick of Time
- Proposal by Proxy
- The 225th Anniversary of the Landing of the Huguenots at New Rochelle
- The Protectory's Oldest Boy
- The Girl of the Cabaret
- Oh! Such a Beautiful Ocean
- The Missing Witness
- The Lie That Failed
- Waiting for Hubby
- The Spirit of Envy
- The Medium's Nemesis
- An Unromantic Maiden
- The Ward of the King
- The Spartan Father
- Frazzled Finance
- Moths
- The Veteran Mounted Police Horse
- His Last Bet
- Taming Their Grandchildren
- The Message to Headquarters
- Redemption
- Flood Tide
- When The Worm Turned
- Robin Hood, Parts 1 and 2
- An Unfair Exchange
- The Official Goat Protector
- The Farmer's Daughters
- Life's Pathway
- Robin Hood, Parts 3 and 4
- The Twins and the Other Girl
- Louie, the Life Saver
- The Daughter Worth While
- The Plot Against the Governor
- The Final Game
- A Peaceful Victory
- Lobster Salad and Milk
- The Old Folks at Home
- The Silver-Tongued Orator
- Democratic Club Clambake
- How Filmy Won His Sweetheart
- Algy's Awful Auto
- The Twentieth Century Farmer
- The Junior Partner
- Friday, the Thirteenth
- Looking for Trouble
- The Campaign Manageress
- Bread Upon the Waters
- The Children's Hour
- He Couldn't Lose
- Baby's Joy Ride
- The Clothes Line Quarrel
- A Shot Gun Cupid
- Their Great Big Beautiful Doll
- The Blight of Wealth
- Curfew Shall Not Ring Tonight
- Her Right to Happiness
- The Henpecked Hod Carrier
- The Legend of Provence
- The Problem Love Solved
- The Little Church Around the Corner
- What Might Have Been
- The Milkman's Revenge
- A Beauty Parlor Graduate
- His Imaginary Family
- Uncle's Namesakes
- Lawyer, Dog and Baby
- Peggy's Invitation
- The Bush Leaguer's Dream
- Jack And The Beanstalk
- The Law of Humanity
- An Orphan's Romance
- Cupid's Lieutenant
- His Father's Wife
- The Head Waiter
- An Amateur Animal Trainer

== 1914 ==
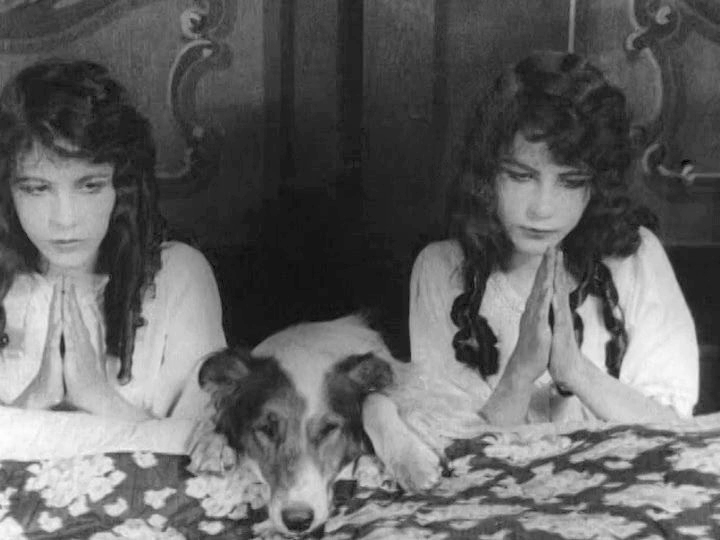
Still from Shep's Race with Death

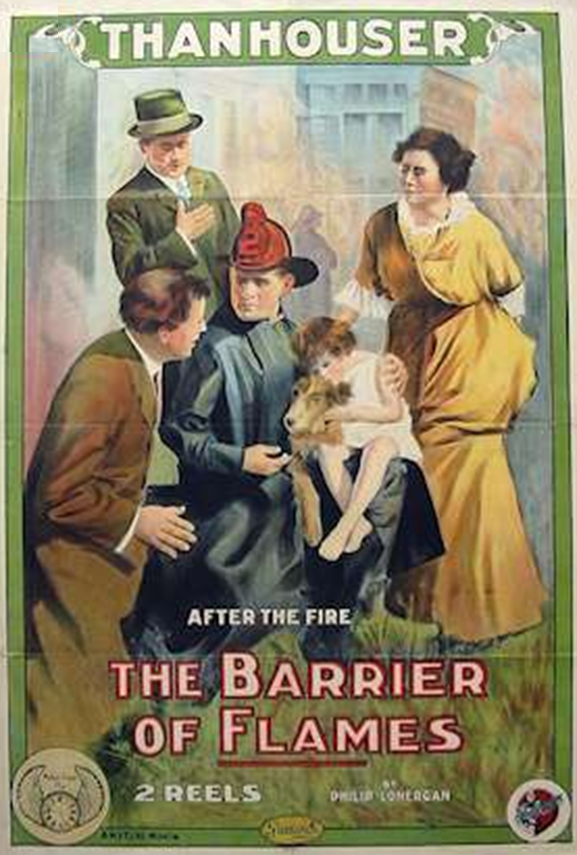
Poster for The Barrier of Flames

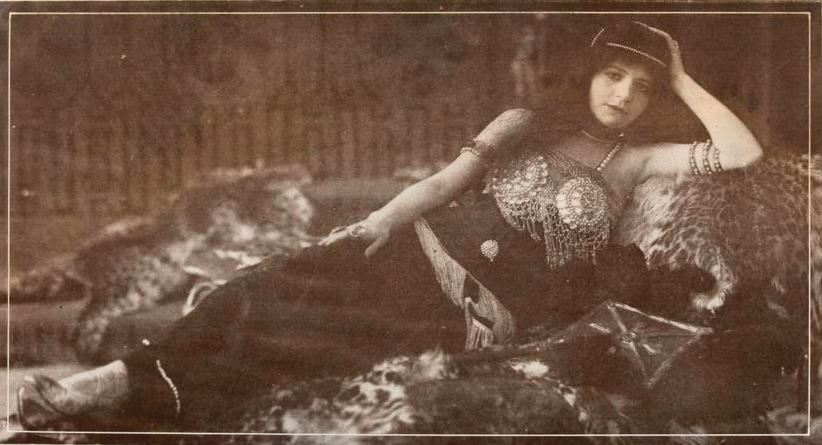
Marguerite Snow in Joseph in the Land of Egypt

A Dog's Love

- Frou Frou
- A Rural Free Delivery Romance
- Their Golden Wedding
- Mrs. Pinkhurst's Proxy
- A Circumstantial Nurse
- The Runaway Princess
- Two Little Dromios
- Adrift in a Great City
- Coals of Fire
- When the Cat Came Back
- Turkey Trot Town
- Her Love Letters
- An Elusive Diamond
- The Vacant Chair
- The Elevator Man
- The Woman Pays
- The Loser Wins
- Joseph in the Land of Egypt
- Why Reginald Reformed
- Twins and a Stepmother
- The Success of Selfishness
- When Paths Diverged
- Percy's First Holiday
- The Dancer
- The Tangled Cat
- The Skating Master
- A Leak in the Foreign Office
- All's Well That Ends Well
- A Can of Baked Beans
- The Golden Cross
- The Hold-Up
- Their Best Friend
- Cardinal Richelieu's Ward
- The Scientist's Doll
- The Desert Tribesman
- A Seminary Consumed by Flames
- Her Way
- Guilty or Not Guilty
- Kathleen, the Irish Rose
- Billy's Ruse
- The Eugenic Boy
- The Cat's Paw
- The Grand Passion
- Their Cousin From England
- The Miser's Reversion
- Beautiful Snow
- When Sorrow Fades
- Repentance
- Dope
- Her First Lesson
- The Tin Soldier and the Dolls
- A Debut in the Secret Service
- Too Much Turkey
- An Hour Of Youth
- The Musician's Daughter
- Her Awakening
- The Infant Heart Snatcher
- The Strike
- His Reward
- When Algy Froze Up
- The Strategy of Conductor 786
- From the Flames
- Politeness Pays
- Getting Rid Of Algy
- A Woman's Loyalty
- Forced To Be Stylish
- Lost—A Union Suit
- A Mohammedan Conspiracy
- In Her Sleep
- The Somnambulist
- A Dog of Flanders
- A Circus Romance
- Algy's Alibi
- Pamela Congreve
- Was She Right in Forgiving Him?
- The Legend of Snow White
- A Telephone Strategy
- When The Wheels of Justice Clogged
- Out of the Shadows
- His Enemy
- The Scrub Lady
- Beating Back
- Rivalry
- The Toy Shop
- The Girl Across the Hall
- Remorse
- The Little Senorita
- The Man Without Fear
- The Outlaw's Nemesis
- For Her Child
- Professor Snaith
- The Widow's Mite
- The Harlow Handicap
- The Decoy
- The Cooked Goose
- Deborah
- The Girl of the Seasons
- The Leaven of Good
- The Substitute
- A Gentleman for a Day
- The Veteran's Sword
- Harry's Waterloo
- The Protean Play
- The Pendulum of Fate
- From Wash to Washington
- The Messenger of Death
- The Target of Destiny
- The Butterfly Bug
- The Guiding Hand
- Her Duty
- The Tell-Tale Scar
- Stronger Than Death
- In Peril's Path
- A Rural Romance
- Her Big Brother
- Mc Carn Plays Fate
- The Belle of the School
- Dog's Good Deed
- Conscience
- The Keeper of the Light
- Arty the Artist
- A Mother's Choice
- His Winning Way
- Little Mischief
- Jean of the Wilderness
- In Danger's Hour
- Sis
- The Emperor's Spy
- Gold
- The Master Hand
- The Mettle of a Man
- Varsity Race
- The Final Test
- The Harvest of Regrets
- The Trail of the Love-Lorn
- The Balance of Power
- A Dog's Love
- The Cripple
- The Benevolence of Conductor 786
- Lizards of the Desert
- The One Who Cared
- The Rescue
- The Diamond of Disaster
- One Little Touch
- The Touch of a Little Hand
- Left in the Train
- Old Jackson's Girl
- The Face at the Window
- Mr. Cinderella
- A Madonna of the Poor
- The Dead Line
- Shep's Race with Death
- The Turning of the Road
- When Vice Shuddered
- Keeping a Husband
- The Terror of Anger
- The Chasm
- Seeds of Jealousy
- The Man with the Hoe
- Pawns of Fate
- A Bum Mistake
- A Messenger of Gladness
- Nature's Celebrities
- Good Fellowship
- Mrs. Van Ruyter's Stratagem
- The Wild, Wooly West
- The Center of the Web
- The Reator of "Hunger”
- Naidra, the Dream Woman
- The Amateur Detective
- The Reader of Minds
- In The Conservatory
- The Barrier of Flames
- Shadows and Sunshine
- Sid Nee's Finish
- Under False Colors
- The White Rose
- A Hatful of Trouble
- Lucy's Elopement

== 1915 ==
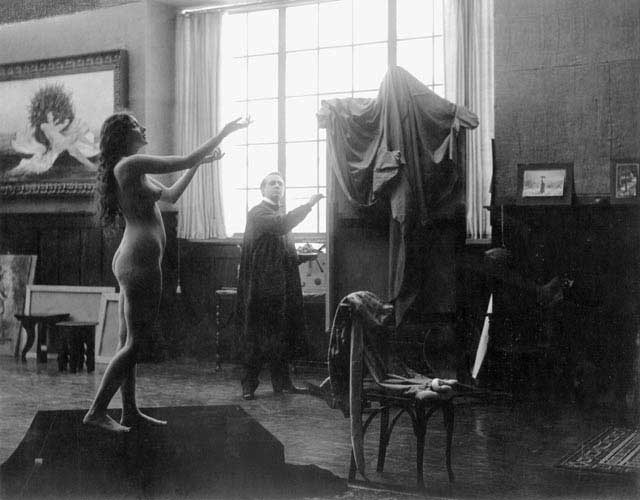
Audrey Munson and Thomas A. Curran in Inspiration

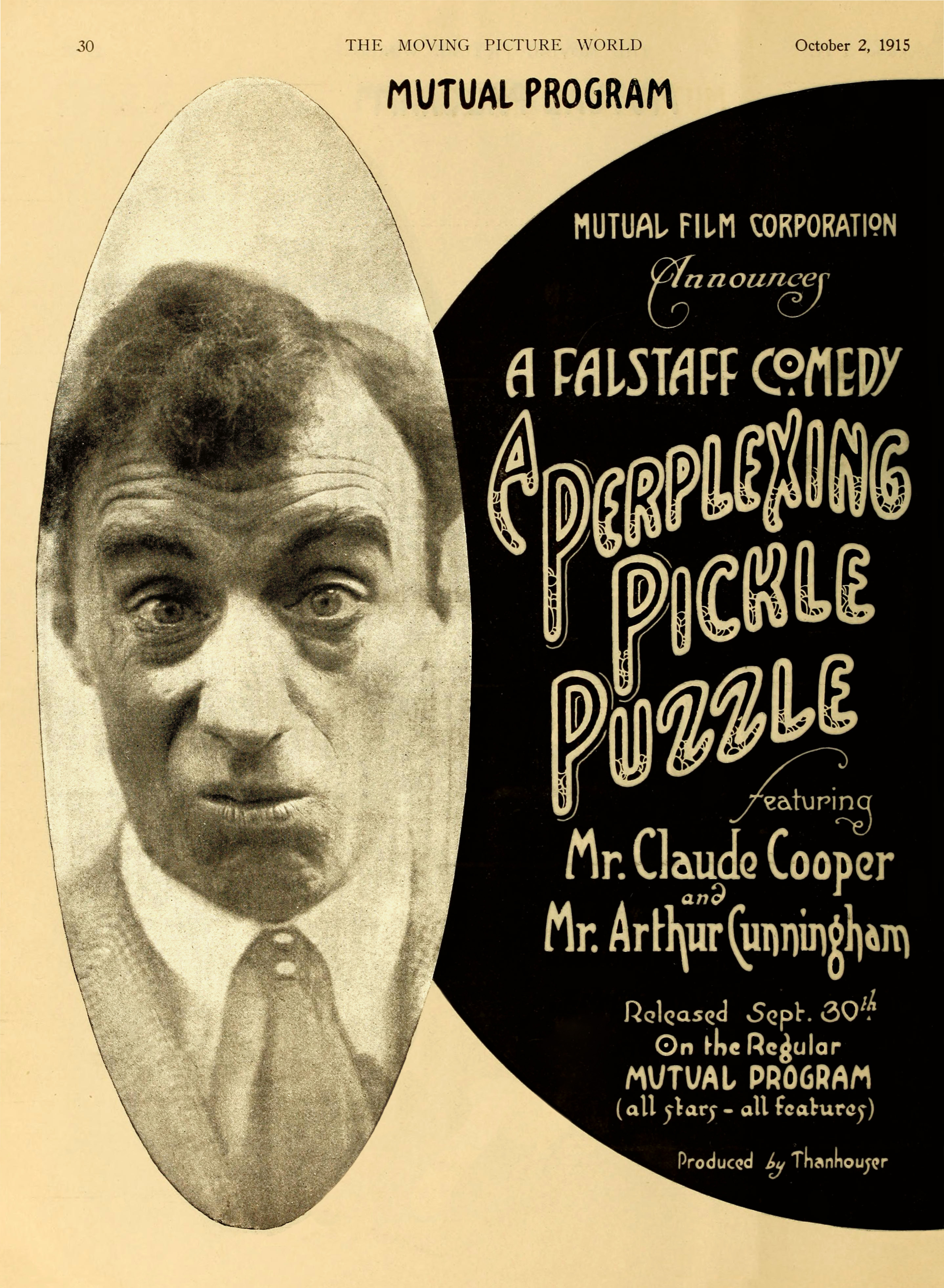
Claude Cooper in A Perplexing Pickle Puzzle

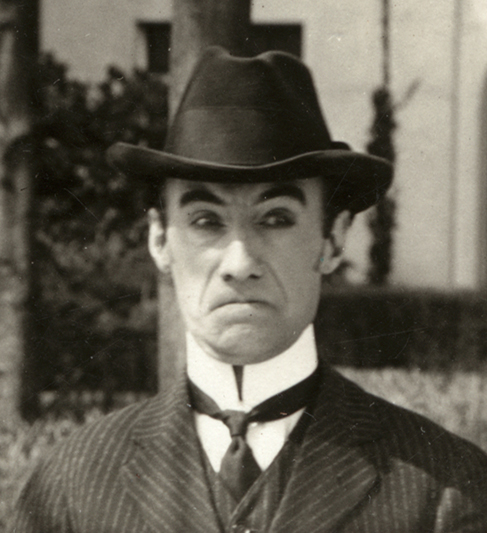
Claude Cooper in Daughter of Kings

Their One Love

- Shep the Sentinel
- When Fate Rebelled
- The Bridal Bouquet
- Her Menacing Past
- Check No. 130
- An Inside Tip
- The Speed King
- Pleasing Uncle
- Graft vs. Love
- An Innocent Burglar
- The Dog Catcher's Bride
- The Finger Prints of Fate
- The Home of Silence
- The Volunteer Fireman
- Helen Intervenes
- In the Jury Room
- Nellie's Strategy
- The Shoplifter
- The Smuggled Diamond
- Across the Way
- Gratitude of Conductor 786
- A Man of Iron
- Who Got Stung?
- His Sister's Kiddies
- The Adventure of Florence
- $1,000 Reward
- On Account of a Dog
- A Newspaper Nemesis
- On the Brink of the Abyss
- And He Never Knew
- The Mishaps of Marceline
- The Final Reckoning
- Do Unto Others
- Little Bobby
- The Master's Model
- Joe Harkins' Ward
- The Stolen Jewels
- The Duel in the Dark
- Jealousy
- The Skinflint
- The Spirit of Uplift
- The Magnet of Destruction
- The Schemers
- The Life Worth While
- The Cycle of Hatred
- Just Kids
- A Double Exposure
- The Moment of Sacrifice
- The Actor and the Rube
- Big Brother Bill
- The Undertow
- The Handicap of Beauty
- The Reformation of Peter and Paul
- Fashion and the Simple Life
- Bianca Forgets
- Movie Fans
- Their One Love
- The Last Concert
- Monsieur Nikola Dupree
- A Scientific Mother
- Love and Money
- The Song of the Heart
- Ferdie Fink's Flirtations
- The Three Roses
- The Heart of the Princess Marsari
- God's Witness
- The House that Jack Moved
- The Refugee
- Daughter of Kings
- Fairy Fern Seed
- It's an Ill Wind
- The Angel in the Mask
- The Baby Benefactor
- The Girl of the Sea
- Truly Rural Types
- A Freight Car Honeymoon
- The Patriot and the Spy
- The Six-Cent Loaf
- His Guardian Auto
- Bud Blossom
- Through Edith's Looking Glass
- The Country Girl
- Ebenezer Explains
- In the Valley
- Little Herman
- The Two Cent Mystery
- Which Shall It Be?
- The Stolen Anthurium
- Innocence at Monte Carlo
- Crossed Wires
- The Flying Twins
- The Silent Co-Ed
- Fifty Years After Appomattox
- A Maker of Guns
- Mme. Blanche, Beauty Doctor
- Tracked Through the Snow
- Mercy on a Crutch
- Dot on the Day Line Boat
- His I.O.U.
- Old Jane of the Gaiety
- The Picture of Dorian Gray
- P. Henry Jenkins and Mars
- His Two Patients
- Outcasts of Society
- Milestones of Life
- Getting the Gardener's Goat
- The Game
- When the Fleet Sailed
- A Plugged Nickel
- The Revenge of the Steeple-Jack
- Cupid in the Olden Time
- A Message Through Flames
- Gussie, the Graceful Life Guard
- Weighed in the Balance
- The Crogmere Ruby
- The Marvelous Marathoner
- When Hungry Hamlet Fled
- Help! Help!
- In a Japanese Garden
- Glorianna's Getaway
- Snapshots
- M. Lecoq
- That Poor Damp Cow
- The Vagabonds
- A Massive Movie Mermaid
- Reincarnation
- Biddy Brady's Birthday
- From the River's Depths
- Pansy's Prison Pies
- The Bowl-Bearer
- The Mother of Her Dreams
- Weary Walker's Woes
- Out of the Sea
- Superstitious Sammy
- Helen's Babies
- Bessie's Bachelor Boobs
- The Twins of the G.L. Ranch
- Simon's Swimming Soul Mate
- The Dead Man's Keys
- Con, the Car Conductor
- A Disciple of Nietzsche
- The Miracle
- Gustav Gebhardt's Gutter Band
- The Road To Fame
- A Perplexing Pickle Puzzle
- The Price of Her Silence
- The Mystery of Eagle's Cliff
- Cousin Clara's Cook Book
- The Light on the Reef
- Dicky's Demon Dachshund
- The Has Been
- Capers of College Chaps
- Down on the Phony Farm
- The Scoop at Bellville
- Bing-Bang Brothers
- The Long Arm of the Secret Service
- John T. Rocks and the Flivver
- Busted but Benevolent
- The Spirit of Audubon
- Hattie, the Hair Heiress
- At the Patrician Club
- Tillie, the Terrible Typist
- The Conscience of Juror No. 10
- His Wife
- The Soap Suds Star
- The Fisherwoman
- Freddie, the Fake Fisherwoman
- The Commuted Sentence
- "Clarissa's" Charming Calf
- Seventh Noon
- Mr. Meeson's Will
- The Mistake of Mammy Lou
- Lulu's Lost Lotharios
- The Little Captain of the Scouts
- The Film Favorite's Finish
- In Baby's Garden
- Hannah's Hen-Pecked Husband
- In the Hands of the Enemy
- A Cunning Canal-Boat Cupid
- Inspiration
- Beneath the Coat of a Butler
- The Postmaster of Pineapple Plains
- The Baby and the Boss
- The Villainous Vegetable Vender
- The Valkyrie
- All Aboard
- Foiling Father's Foes
- The Crimson Sabre
- Checking Charlie's Child
- The House Party at Carson Manor
- Minnie, the Mean Manicurist
- His Vocation
- Clarence Cheats at Croquet
- Her Confession
- The Conductor's Classy Champion
- An Innocent Traitor
- Bill Bunks the Bandits
- The Mill on the Floss
- His Majesty, the King
- The Necklace of Pearls
- The Political Pull of John
- When William's Whiskers Worked
- Ambition
- Toodles, Tom and Trouble
- Una's Useful Uncle
- Their Last Performance
- Foolish Fat Flora

== 1916 ==
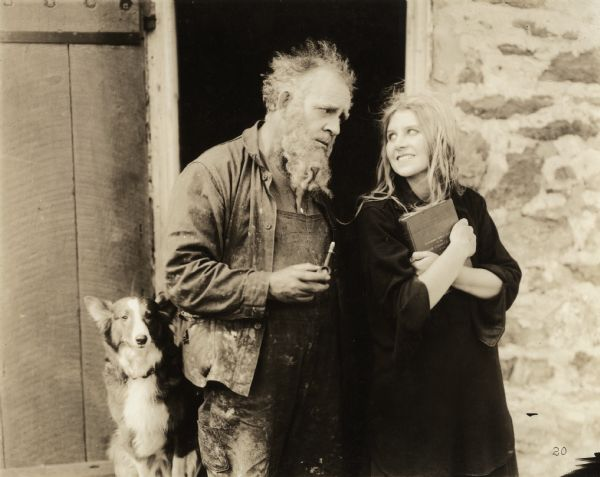
Still from Silas Marner

King Lear

- The Optimistic Oriental Occults
- The Bubbles in the Glass
- Big Gun Making
- Hilda's Husky Helper
- Belinda's Bridal Breakfast
- In the Name of the Law
- Reforming Rubbering Rosie
- The Woman in Politics
- Grace's Gorgeous Gowns
- The Phantom Witness
- The Five Faults of Flo
- Pete's Persian Princess
- Lucky Larry's Lady Love
- The Burglars' Picnic
- Beaten at the Bath
- Betrayed
- A Clever Collie's Comeback
- The Knotted Cord
- Harry's Happy Honeymoon
- Booming the Boxing Business
- The Spirit of the Game
- Snow Storm and Sunshine
- Outwitted
- Silas Marner
- Ruth's Remarkable Reception
- The Reunion
- The Oval Diamond
- Rusty Reggie's Record
- Jungle Life in South America
- Oscar, the Oyster Opener
- The Flight of the Duchess
- The Whispered Word
- A Bird of Prey
- Pansy Post, Protean Player
- The Fifth Ace
- Pedro, the Punk Poet
- Fear
- The Snow Shoveler's Sweetheart
- The Net
- Oh! Oh! Oh! Henery!
- The Traffic Cop
- Sapville's Stalwart Son
- Romance of the Hollow Tree
- Overworked Oversea Overseer
- The Girl from Chicago
- The Man's Sin
- Master Shakespeare, Strolling Player
- Simple Simon's Schooling
- A Man Of Honor
- The Carriage of Death
- Willing Wendy to Willie
- Dashing Druggist's Dilemma
- The Weakling
- The Spirit of '61
- The Skilful Sleigher's Strategy
- When She Played Broadway
- Freddie's Frigid Finish
- Deteckters
- The Answer
- Steven's Sweet Sisters
- Politickers
- For Uncle Sam's Navy
- Disguisers
- Other People's Money
- Peterson's Pitiful Plight
- Advertisementers
- John Brewster's Wife
- Where Wives Win
- Romeoers
- The Window of Dreams
- The Fugitive
- Fare, Lady
- Getting the Grafters
- The Shine Girl
- The Swiss Sea Dog
- The Fear of Poverty
- The Heart of a Doll
- A Flaw in the Evidence
- Saint, Devil and Woman
- Arabella's Prince
- The Pillory
- At the Edge of the Aqueduct
- Prudence the Pirate
- Hidden Valley
- The World and the Woman
- Pamela's Past
- Divorce and the Daughter
- King Lear

== 1917 ==
The Vicar of Wakefield

- Her New York
- A Modern Monte Cristo
- Her Life and His
- The Vicar of Wakefield
- Her Beloved Enemy
- Pots and Pans Peggie
- Mary Lawson's Secret
- When Love Was Blind
- The Woman and the Beast
- Hinton's Double
- The Candy Girl
- An Amateur Orphan
- Fires of Youth
- The Unfortunate Marriage
- The Woman in White
- It Happened to Adele
- The Man Without a Country
- War and the Woman
- Under False Colors
- The Heart of Ezra Greer
