= Stage Struck =

Stage Struck may refer to:

- Stage Struck (album), a live album by Rory Gallagher released in 1980
- Stage Struck (1911 film), a 1911 film produced by the Thanhouser Company
- Stage Struck (1917 film), a silent film drama directed by Edward Morrissey
- Stage Struck (1925 film), a 1925 film produced by Paramount Pictures, starring Gloria Swanson, restored by George Eastman House
- Stage Struck (1936 film), a 1936 American film
- Stage Struck (1948 film), a 1948 film with Conrad Nagel
- Stage Struck (1958 film), a 1958 American film
- Stagestruck: Theater, AIDS, and the Marketing of Gay America, a 1998 non-fiction book
