= Young Lord Stanley =

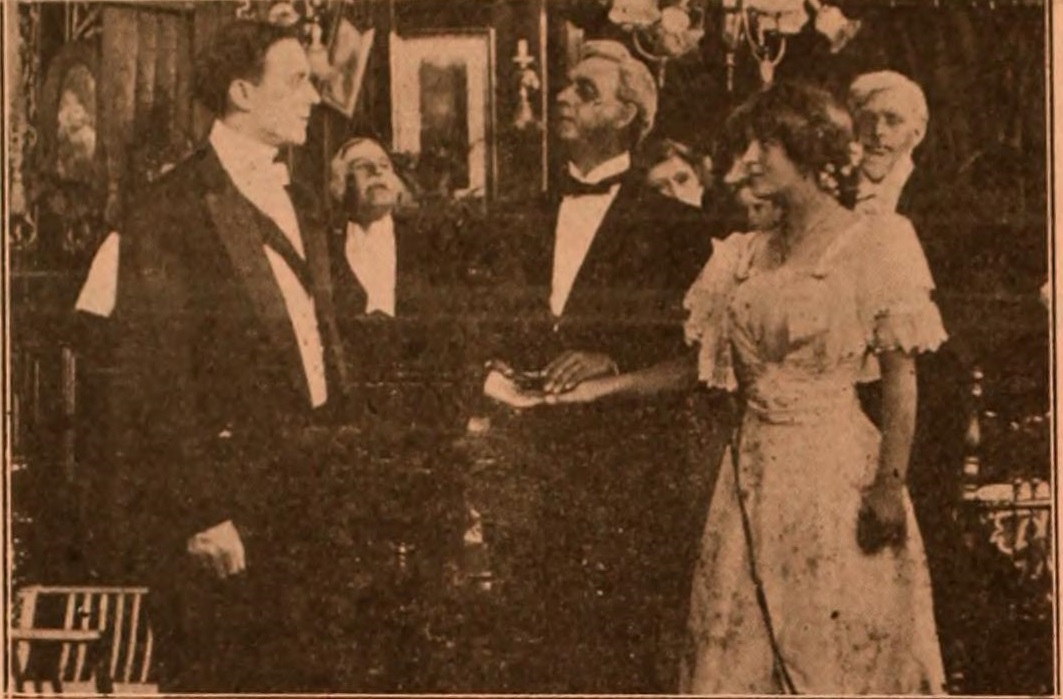
- A film still showing the climax scene with Jack reintroduced to Ann as Lord Stanley
- Produced by: Thanhouser Company
- Distributed by: Motion Picture Distributing and Sales Company
- Release date: October 25, 1910
- Running time: 13:35
- Country: United States
- Languages: Silent; English intertitles

Young Lord Stanley, possibly re-issued as His Only Son, is a 1910 American silent drama short film produced by the Thanhouser Company. The film focuses on Jack Stanley who is disinherited by this father, Lord Stanley, for refusing to marry his cousin. Jack heads to America and takes a job as a groom. He is dismissed from his position after his employer learns of Jack's affections for his daughter, Ann. Meanwhile, Lord Stanley decides to reinstate Jack in his will and then promptly dies, giving him his entire fortune. Jack reads of his father's death in the newspaper and learns of his father's will. The film concludes with the lawyer bringing Jack to a dinner party as "Lord Stanley". Ann's father wishes for her to earn his affections, but she is defiant and does not even look at him. Once she learns it his Jack, they kiss. The scenario was written by Lloyd Lonergan and the only known actor is Justus D. Barnes as Ann's father. A surviving print of the film exists in the Library of Congress and it shows the improvement of the Thanhouser interior sets over films from months prior. The film was released on October 25, 1910, and was met with mixed reviews.

== Plot ==
Young Lord Stanley (1910)

Jack Stanley is disinherited by his father, Lord Stanley, because he refuses to marry his cousin, Lady Maude. Jack emigrates to America, but has no money and has no job upon which to sustain himself. While pondering his actions, he witnesses a trio of riders approach and speak to him. He accepts a position as a groom for a wealthy American, but he falls in love with his daughter, Ann. When her father learns of this, he dismisses Jack and Ann says she will never marry anyone but him. Meanwhile, Lord Stanley has come to forgive his son and decided to reinstate him in his will. No sooner has the task been completed does Lord Stanley suddenly dies.

Upon reading the paper, Jack sees an advertisement about the heir of the late Lord Stanley. He heads to Hotel Astor and learns that he has received his father's entire fortune. The lawyer accepts a dinner invitation at the wealthy American's house and brings along Jack. The father urges his daughter to win the affections of the rich, handsome and unmarried young Lord Stanley. Upon his arrival, the father who had shunned him is taken aback and greets him, but Ann refuses to even look at the guest. She ignores him, and refuses to face him even as they head towards the dining room, but Jack attempts to kiss her and she pulls away. Suddenly, Ann sees it is Jack and embraces him with a kiss.

== Cast ==
- Jack (Young Lord Stanley) - Unknown actor
- Lord Stanley - Unknown actor
- Ann (the girl) - Unknown actress
- Justus D. Barnes as Ann's father
- Snaith the lawyer - Unknown actor

== Production ==
The script for the production was written by Lloyd Lonergan, an experienced newspaperman employed by The New York Evening World while writing scripts for the Thanhouser productions. The film director is unknown, but it may have been Barry O'Neil. Film historian Q. David Bowers does not attribute a cameraman for this production, but at least two possible candidates exist. Blair Smith was the first cameraman of the Thanhouser company, but he was soon joined by Carl Louis Gregory who had years of experience as a still and motion picture photographer. The role of the cameraman was uncredited in 1910 productions. The other cast credits are unknown, but many 1910 Thanhouser productions are fragmentary. In late 1910, the Thanhouser company released a list of the important personalities in their films. The list includes G.W. Abbe, Justus D. Barnes, Frank H. Crane, Irene Crane, Marie Eline, Violet Heming, Martin J. Faust, Thomas Fortune, George Middleton, Grace Moore, John W. Noble, Anna Rosemond, Mrs. George Walters.

The production of the film shows the continuing improvement of Thanhouser works, specifically for more realistic interior scenes, over those shot in the months prior. The progress referred to here is the improvement from works like The Two Roses. The interior sets are still very small, but the exterior shots show strength in their variety. Bowers believes that the uncommon surname, Snaith, is of some importance to Lonergan because of its reoccurring usage, including the titled works Miss Arabella Snaith and Professor Snaith. An analysis of the frame showing the newspaper advertisement shows that it was from a real newspaper dated from September 21, 1910. The title of the film might possibly be a reference to "Lord Stanley", the courtesy title of the heir apparent of the Earl of Derby. At the time of the production Edward Stanley, Lord Stanley, was "Lord Stanley".

== Release and reception ==
The single reel drama, approximately 1,000 feet long, was released on October 25, 1910. The film was originally released a Young Lord Stanley, but the surviving print from the Library of Congress has "His Only Son" as what appears to be the title of the print. Bowers notes that this first card is in a different format from the other inter-titles which follow and may have been a replacement or alternate name for the print. The surviving print is 928 feet long, and its shown length is 13 minutes and 35 seconds. The film likely had a wide national release, advertising theaters are known in Kansas, Indiana, and Pennsylvania.

Walton of The Moving Picture News said the film was, "A bright, clean, human interest tale. It holds the attention from beginning to end. A thoroughly commendable reel - in every way." The Moving Picture World offers a summary of the work and was more or less neutral in its review of the film. The reviewer states, "It is a romantic picture, affording ample opportunity for the imagination to run riot in a number of different directions. ... Much of human nature is disclosed in this film, even though it is, in a way, a travesty upon the way wealthy girls often fall in love with stablemen or others employed about their fathers' places." The New York Dramatic Mirror was not very critical, but not offering any praise either. The reviewer highlighted the "common fault of actors" by throwing things on the floor and how Ann's refusal to even look at the titled guest was overdone.

== See also ==
- List of American films of 1910
