= Cupid at the Circus =

- Produced by: Thanhouser Company
- Release date: May 20, 1910
- Country: United States
- Languages: Silent film English intertitles

Cupid at the Circus is a 1910 American silent short drama film produced by the Thanhouser Company. The film is a romance with a storyline focused around a country boy who follows a circus parade to the circus grounds and becomes intent on sneaking into the show. He is discovered, but before he can be ejected, a girl asks her father to buy him a ticket of admission. Thankful, the boy gives her his pocket knife. Years later the two meet again and when he sees her using his pocket knife. He proposes and she accepts. Not too much is known for certain about the production of this film, including the writer, director and photographer credits. The circus scenes were done with special arrangement by Barnum & Bailey. The film was released on May 20, 1910, to favorable reviews. The film is presumed lost.

== Plot ==
Though the film is presumed lost, a surviving official synopsis was published in The Moving Picture World. It states: "Tom Wilk is a poor country lad, living alone with his stepfather, who ill-treats him. Tom leaves his work one day to follow a circus parade. He is fascinated with the wonders of the parade and follows it to the circus grounds, around which he stays all morning, and is finally tempted by his great wish to see the show, to crawl under the tent. He is discovered by a circus guard, and ordered off the ground. A small girl, Lillie Lockwood, and her father come to the circus, and witness Tom's ejection. Urged by his daughter, Lillie's father buys Tom a ticket of admission, giving him his first happy day. In return, Tom gives Lillie, as a keepsake, his most treasured possession, his pocket knife. On returning home, Tom is severely chastised by his step-father, after which he decides to run away. He walks to a neighboring town, and is there engaged as an office boy by Gates, a lawyer. After some years of faithful service, in various capacities, Tom becomes a member of the firm. Lillie obtains a position as a stenographer in their office. She and Tom do not recognize each other, until Tom accidentally sees in her hand the little knife he had given her in the long ago. He declares he had loved her through the years, and has been patiently waiting for her, so the romance that began at the circus finds a happy climax at the altar."

== Cast ==
- Frank H. Crane as Tom Gates (adult) / alternatively Tom Wilk in the synopsis
- Anna Rosemond as Lillie Lockwood (adult)

== Production ==
The writer of the scenario is unknown, but it may have been Lloyd Lonergan. Lonergan was an experienced newspaperman still employed by The New York Evening World while writing scripts for the Thanhouser productions. He was the most important script writer for Thanhouser, averaging 200 scripts a year from 1910 to 1915. While the director of the film is not known, two Thanhouser directors are possible. Barry O'Neil was the stage name of Thomas J. McCarthy, who would direct many important Thanhouser pictures, including its first two-reeler, Romeo and Juliet. Lloyd B. Carleton was the stage name of Carleton B. Little, a director who would stay with the Thanhouser Company for a short time, moving to Biograph Company by the summer of 1910. Bowers does not attribute either as the director for this particular production nor does Bowers credit a cameraman. Blair Smith was the first cameraman of the Thanhouser company, but he was soon joined by Carl Louis Gregory who had years of experience as a still and motion picture photographer. The role of the cameraman was uncredited in 1910 productions. The two known credits in the film are for the leading players, Anna Rosemond and Frank H. Crane. Rosemond was one of two leading ladies for the first year of the company and joined in the autumn of 1909. Crane was involved in the very beginnings of the Thanhouser Company from 1909. Crane's was the first leading man of the company and acted in numerous productions before becoming a director at Thanhouser.

The setting of the film included Barnum and Bailey circus that were shot by a special arrangement with Mr. Barnum and Bailey. The date of the filming is unknown, but the 1910 route of Barnum & Bailey's Greatest Show on Earth indicates that it the circus was in New York between March 24 through April 30. The circus was at Madison Square Garden from March 24 through April 22 and it moved to Brooklyn, New York for April 25 through April 30. The circus would go to Philadelphia, Washington D. C., Baltimore, Maryland, and Wilmington, Delaware before moving back up through New Jersey on May 14 through May 18. According to one review in the Santa Cruz Sentinel, the film showed "...the Barnum and Bailey circus from the time they arrive at the lot until after the show."

== Release and reception ==
The one reel film was released on Friday May 20, 1910. There are different records for the length of the reel. According to Bowers, the film was 975 feet long, but one trade publication listed it as being 940 feet long. The film was advertised in theaters in Kansas, Nebraska, Pennsylvania, Missouri, Minnesota, Indiana, and California. The film was released one day before the Barnum and Bailey tent caught fire in Schenectady, New York. The May 21 fire did not result in injury or loss of life, but was caused an estimated $10,000 in damages, equivalent to $346,000 in 2025.

The film was met with favorable reviews from critics. The Morning Telegraph offers general praise for the good photography and the well-told story. The Nickelodeon was equally positive and began to reflect the acting, staging and photography was up to the regular standard of the Thanhouser company. The New York Dramatic Mirror offered additional comments on the Thanhouser company's higher standards in their productions, but gave an otherwise positive review that focused on the novelty of the circus scenes.

== See also ==
- List of American films of 1910
