= The Stolen Invention =

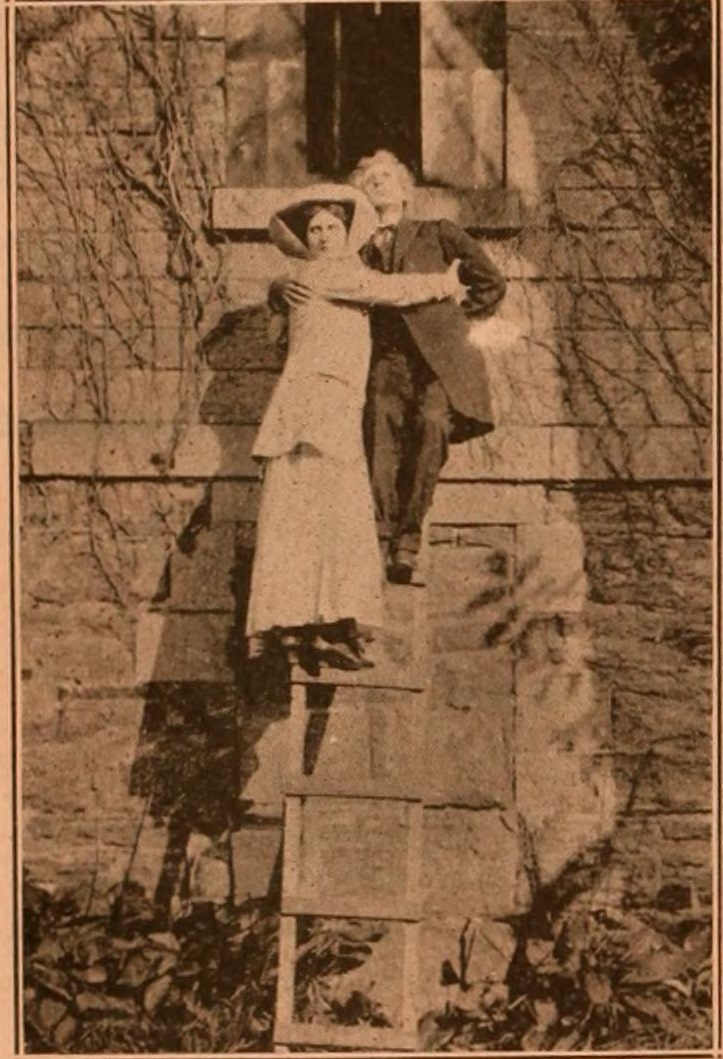
- A surviving film still
- Produced by: Thanhouser Company
- Distributed by: Motion Picture Distributing and Sales Company
- Release date: September 16, 1910
- Country: United States
- Languages: Silent film English intertitles

The Stolen Invention is a 1910 American silent short drama produced by the Thanhouser Company. The film focuses on John Deering, an inventor, whose invention interests Mr. Cobleigh. Deering rejects the small sum Cobleigh offers for the invention, so Cobleigh decides to drug Deering. The effect of the drug makes him temporarily insane and Deering is sent to the asylum. Cobleigh then forges Deering's signature and secures the invention. Deering's daughter breaks her father out of the asylum and nurses him back to health. The girl's sweetheart, Tom, is a lawyer who takes Cobleigh to court and reveals the forgery through a stereopticon; Cobleigh is arrested. The film was released on September 16, 1910, and received neutral to negative reviews. The film is presumed lost.

== Plot ==
Though the film is presumed lost, a synopsis survives in The Moving Picture World from September 17, 1910. It states: "John Deering is a poor inventor living modestly with his wife and only daughter. He has approached Mr. Cobleigh, a capitalist, with a proposition to share the profits of a new invention with him, providing that he (Cobleigh) furnish the capital to swing it. Cobleigh comes to see the model of Deering's invention and is greatly impressed with it. Cobleigh offers Deering a small amount of money for the invention, but Deering refuses to accept it. Then Cobleigh, having failed to get his invention by fair means, determines to secure it by foul. He drugs Deering, and the result of the poison is to make the inventor temporarily insane. While in this condition, Cobleigh has Deering transferred to an insane asylum. Then he forges the inventor's name to the bill of sale and thinks that his crime will never be discovered. Deering's daughter, Grace, failing to induce her sweetheart, Tom Reynolds, to aid in rescuing Deering, breaks into the asylum and takes her father out singlehandedly. She conveys him to a camp in the woods where her tender care restores him to health. Then she takes him home again and he demands his rights from Cobleigh. The latter denies that he owes Deering a cent, and the inventor goes to law. Tom, who acts as his counsel, shows by enlarged stereopticon views of the two signatures that Cobleigh had traced the one from the other. Cobleigh, overcome by the revelation of his crime, is arrested, and the Deering family and the faithful Tom are happy."

== Production ==
The writer of the scenario is unknown, but it was most likely Lloyd Lonergan. He was an experienced newspaperman employed by The New York Evening World while writing scripts for the Thanhouser productions. The film director is unknown, but it may have been Barry O'Neil. Film historian Q. David Bowers does not attribute a cameraman for this production, but at least two possible candidates exist. Blair Smith was the first cameraman of the Thanhouser company, but he was soon joined by Carl Louis Gregory who had years of experience as a still and motion picture photographer. The role of the cameraman was uncredited in 1910 productions. Cast credits are unknown, but many 1910 Thanhouser productions are fragmentary. The Celluloid Couch does not include any credits and only a brief summary of the film in its filmography listing. It is also listed in Psychotherapists on Film without further detailing onto the cast or credits. A surviving film still gives the possibility of identifying the actors of Deering and his daughter.

A reviewer for The New York Dramatic Mirror stated, "It is rather difficult to understand by what magic the two signatures are made to appear in the court room without human agency. They come and go in anything but legal fashion. Evidently their appearance is to be taken symbolically – not realistically." The final part of the review is difficult to infer because the film is lost, but the synopsis states that a stereopticon was used. A stereopticon, not to be confused with a stereoscope, is a type of slide projector that projects an image. According to the synopsis, the production employs one, or possibly two, stereopticon's to display the two different signatures to compare and reveal the forgery. The reviewer seems to state that the appearance as unnatural, perhaps referencing a dissolve effect. The ability to project with a dissolve was a known ability of more advanced stereopticons. According to another reviewer the film included shots of Long Island Sound.

== Release and reception ==
The single-reel drama, approximately 1,000 feet long, was released on September 16, 1910. The film had a wide national release, with known theater advertisements in Pennsylvania, Kansas, Minnesota, Washington, North Carolina, Arizona, and Indiana. The film was also shown in Vancouver, British Columbia, Canada by the Province Theatre.

Reception for this film was mixed, but not praised highly in the three main trade publications. Walton of The Moving Picture News merely commented on how the water scenery and the reviewer for the Moving Picture World stated it was, "[an interesting domestic story, representing the machinations of a capitalist to secure a poor man's invention." The most detailed review was the negative one published in The New York Dramatic Mirror which states, "This film is not so good as the Thanhouser trademark would lead one to expect. The story is long and rambling and the acting is not notable at any point. A drugged potion, a forged receipt, an escape from an insane asylum, and the confounding of the villain are the points around which the threads are woven. The result looks a good deal like crazy work. The sheer impossibility of the plot is not relieved by the details of the mounting or of the action. The wild escape from the lunatic asylum, the row across the river, and hiding in the woods, are all cut upon an absurd pattern. Probably for those who like highly seasoned drama the film will prove entertaining; for others it is too mellow."

== See also ==
- List of American films of 1910
