= The Westerner and the Earl =

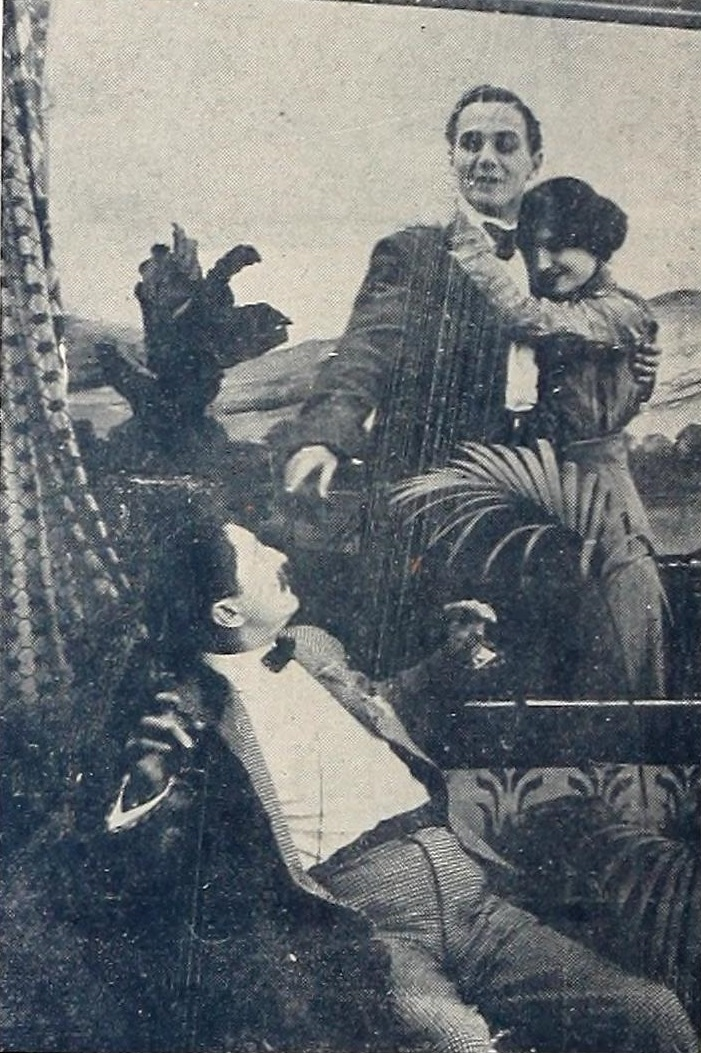
- A film still showing the main characters
- Produced by: Thanhouser Company
- Distributed by: Motion Picture Distributing and Sales Company
- Release date: February 7, 1911
- Running time: 1 reel
- Country: United States
- Languages: Silent film English intertitles

The Westerner and the Earl is a 1911 American silent short drama film produced by the Thanhouser Company. The film focuses on a society woman who seeks to gain status as the mother-in-law of an English earl, but her daughter already loves an American suitor. The earl hires a Wild West show's Indian actors to kidnap him and the heiress so that he can win her affections, but is foiled by her American suitor who hires the cowboy actors and becomes the hero. The earl's plans are foiled and the heiress gets to marry her American suitor. The film was billed as a drama by Thanhouser, but reviewers all state that the plot was that of a comedy. It was released on February 7, 1911. The film is presumed lost.

== Plot ==
The film focuses on Mrs. Montague, an American society woman, who has a fascination on titles of notability. She was delighted to have an English earl pay her a visit and began wanting to see herself as the mother-in-law of an earl. The marriage would be a benefit, since the earl was poor and the Montagues were wealthy with a charming and eligible daughter. Or so she thought, the daughter already had an American sweetheart and did not care for foreign earl. The mother plotted to help the earl win her daughter's affections and informed him of a Wild West Show. The earl hired the proprietor and his band of Indians to kidnap himself and the heiress, then allow the earl to escape and free her so that she would want to marry him. The plot was overheard by her American suitor who contracted the same proprietor to capture the Indians after they captured the heiress. The counter-plan worked and the American suitor was seen as a hero. According to the official synopsis, the earl was "figuratively and literally a 'belted earl' before he finished". Mrs. Montague decided to let her daughter marry the American suitor and the proprietor of the show, Rattlesnake Bill, was also satisfied with the outcome.

== Production ==
Little is known about the production of the film, including the cast, scenario writer and the director. A surviving film still gives the possibility of establishing cast credits, but the fact that the film is lost makes a deeper analysis of the film impossible. The single reel film, approximately 980 feet long, was released on February 7, 1911. The film is presumed lost because the film is not known to be held in any archive or by any collector.

== Reception ==
The production was billed as a drama by the Thanhouser Company, but reviewers decidedly labeled it as comedy due to its plot and execution. Three reviews by the industry were cited by Q. David Bowers and each one was positive. The Billboard stated, "Here's a story that allows for considerable comedy which the Thanhouser people have not overlooked. In fact, they have done admirably in portraying the story of a Westerner who outwits a European noble suitor of an American girl. The film is distinctly enjoyable. The photography is okay." The Moving Picture World recognized the humor and stated that the play was not probable, owing to the belief that films were either very fantastical or based on plausibility. The reviewer stated, "Of course, this play might be true to life, but it seems improbable enough to be only a story. This is not saying that it is not interesting or that it lacks humor. It is merely placing the story itself in the proper category." The New York Dramatic Mirror did not quibble about the plausibility of this "interesting, decidedly novel, [well-acted] comedy" and praised the film without mentioning technical or acting faults.
