= The Converted Deacon =

1910 film

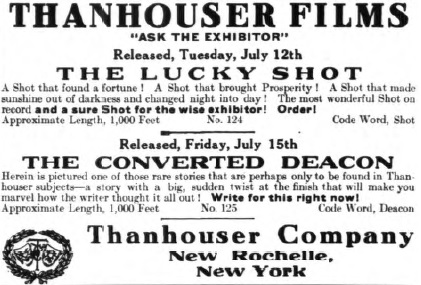
- An advertisement for the film in Billboard
- Produced by: Thanhouser Company
- Release date: July 15, 1910
- Country: United States
- Languages: Silent film English intertitles

The Converted Deacon is a 1910 American silent short drama produced by the Thanhouser Company. The film follows the daughter who disobeys her father by associated with the theater and becomes a star on the stage. She keeps it a secret, but he father arrives in town and takes her home because her mother is ill. John DeLacy follows her home and disguises himself to secure a position on the farm. A newspaper reveals the daughter's fame and only after a song and dance does the father's anger abate and allows the two lovers to marry. Little is known about the production of the film, but the Thanhouser films were distinguished as being the best of the Independent companies in a The New York Dramatic Mirror editorial. The film was released on July 15, 1910, and met with mixed reception. The film is presumed lost

== Plot ==
Though the film is presumed lost, a synopsis survives in The Moving Picture World from July 16, 1910. It states: "May Sanders is the daughter of a farmer, Deacon Sanders, who is nearly as poor as he is religious. May goes to the city to seek employment, and her father warns her to shun theatres and bad company. Her first job is a maid in the home of Mrs. Carr, wife of a theatrical manager. Mrs. Carr discovers that May can sing and dance exceptionally well, and her husband places May on the stage. She makes a hit right from the start. Also she annexes the affections of John DeLacy, a wealthy young man. But she does not dare tell her parents about her new vocation. Matters drag along until the Deacon unexpectedly arrives in town. May has still pretended to be the maid of Mrs. Carr, and the father finds her in the house when she calls. He tells her that her mother is ill, and she is needed at home. She goes and is promptly put to work on the farm. John follows his sweetheart to the country, and to be near her, pretends to be poor and secures a job on the farm. The newspaper gives the Deacon a clue to the mystery, and he prepares to disown his daughter. But when she sings and dances, his anger melts, he forgives May and John, who later marry with a paternal blessing."

== Production ==
The writer of the scenario is unknown, but it was most likely Lloyd Lonergan. Lonergan was an experienced newspaperman employed by The New York Evening World while writing scripts for the Thanhouser productions. The film director and the cameraman are unknown and no known credits for the cast are cited by film historian, Q. David Bowers. Members cast may have included the leading players of the Thanhouser productions, Anna Rosemond, Frank H. Crane and Violet Heming.

Despite the lack of production details, the quality of the Thanhouser films in general stood out amongst the Independent producers. An editorial by "The Spectator" in The New York Dramatic Mirror contained specific praise for Thanhouser productions by stating, "...practically all other Independent American companies, excepting Thanhouser, show haste and lack of thought in their production. Crude stories are crudely handled, giving the impression that they are rushed through in a hurry - anything to get a thousand feet of negative ready for the market. Such pictures, of course, do not cost much to produce, but they are not of a class to make reputation. The Thanhouser company, alone of the Independents, shows a consistent effort to do things worthwhile..." The editorial warned that American audiences were not subject to be entertained by the novelty of moving images and cautioned the Independents that there was distinct danger in quantity over quality. The editorial was written by Frank E. Woods of the American Biograph Company, a Licensed company, and like the publication itself had a considerable slant to the Licensed companies.

== Release and reception ==
The single reel drama, approximately 1000 feet long, was released on July 15, 1910. The film had a wide national release in the United States, theaters showing advertisements include those in Kansas, North Carolina, Maryland, Indiana, Pennsylvania, Arizona, and Missouri. One of the last advertisements for the film was in Neosho, Missouri on May 14, 1913.

The film received mixed reception in trade publications, but some advertisements would boast the power of the film or go so far as to call it a great American drama. The Moving Picture News stated, "As a sketch of country folk, admirable because it is true. The situations are well worked out. The conversion! Could it be? A New England church meeting would be a good place to exhibit and - ask questions." Though the reviewer in The New York Dramatic Mirror however disagreed that the premise was plausible, "A [straight-laced] old deacon forms the complicating element in this rather conventional and rather improbable story. That a girl could become a comic opera star without the knowledge of her parents is a strain for the imagination. That a simple little dance like the one in the picture could effect such a conversion is another tax on belief. The acting is good, especially in the heroine's role. The deacon displays an unnatural tendency in such a stern character when he rapturously kisses the photograph of his daughter." It is unknown if the character of Deacon Sanders is really a church deacon because the synopsis states Deacon Sanders is a farmer who is "nearly as poor as he is religious".

== See also ==
- List of American films of 1910
