= Only in the Way =

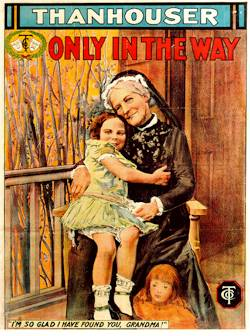
- Poster for the film
- Produced by: Thanhouser Company
- Distributed by: Motion Picture Distributing and Sales Company
- Release date: January 31, 1911
- Running time: 1 reel
- Country: United States
- Languages: Silent film English inter-titles

Only in the Way is a 1911 American silent short drama film produced by the Thanhouser Company. The film focuses on a grandmother who seeks the support of her only son and makes herself comfortable in his house. The grandmother is welcomed and befriended by Marie, her crippled granddaughter. The son's wife cannot bear to live with her mother-in-law and delivers an ultimatum to her husband: "Either your mother or I must leave this house!" The husband decides to put his mother in an old folks' home and the wife informs her she is to leave immediately. Little Marie is upset that her grandmother has to leave because she was "only in the way" and decides that as a cripple, so was she. Marie pens a letter to this effect and runs away to the old people's home. The parents frantically search for Marie and discover the note. They rush to the home and are relieved to find Marie safe and the family departs together with her grandmother.

The film was released on January 31, 1911 and was met with generally favorable reviews. Walton of The Moving Picture News was critical, noting the similarities to a film released four days prior by Gaumont. The film survives in the Library of Congress.

== Plot ==
Only in the Way (1911)

The official synopsis establishes back-story that is not seen or referenced in the beginning of the film, stating that Mrs. Gage turned to her only son for support after losing the last of her savings. Seeking his support, Mrs. Gage arrives at his house and is shown in by her granddaughter, Marie. The son welcomes his mother, but his wife strongly objects to having her mother-in-law take up residence in the house. Shown to her room by Marie, Mrs. Gage makes herself comfortable and gives Marie a kitten. "Granny" quickly becomes friends with little Marie. The wife struggles with Granny's presence, but her patience is tested when Granny knocks over a vase, and in recoiling, knocks over a sewing box. The mother delivers an ultimatum to her husband, "Either your mother or I must leave this house!" Though not shown, the husband decides that his mother is to go. In the next scene, the wife appears and informs her that she must leave. Marie assists her grandmother before her departure to the old folks' home with her son. She is upset that her grandmother was made to leave because she was "only in the way" and that as a cripple, she is no different. Marie writes a letter explaining that she has gone to live with grandma and departs to the old folks' home. Marie's journey with the kitten in one arm and her crutch in the other is a difficult one. On the way, she stumbles and loses her crutch in a brook, but she limps onward. Her parents search frantically for Marie and discover the note. The parents head to the old folks' home and are relieved to find Marie with her grandmother. The wife then informs the nurse that Granny will be leaving. After packing her belongings, the family depart.

== Production ==
Little is known about the production or cast of the film despite its surviving status. The only known credit cited by Q. David Bowers is that of Marie Eline cast in the role of Marie. The director, scenario writer and cameraman are also unknown. Thanhouser Company Film Preservation states that the dramatic theme of the film was "family disharmony" and it took the expected sentimental approach for the era. Marie who identifies with her grandmother resolves that she is also "Only in the Way" by virtue of being a cripple. The site states, "Thanhouser scenarists seemed to have had a special sensitivity for the feelings of children which is reflected in this film."

== Release and reception ==
The single reel film, approximately 1,000 feet long, was released on January 31, 1911. The Billboard praised Marie Eline's acting also noting the good photography in its review. The Moving Picture World's review states, "The part played by the grandmother and the one played by the child are both pathetic and cannot fail to touch the heart. The person who can sit through this and not feel the tears welling up to his eyes is strangely callous to human grief and emotion." The New York Dramatic Mirror was open in its praise of the film and its portrayal of the subject through good acting, but it also noted the technical faults with film continuity. The reviewer wrote, "It was noticed that the old lady's bag was brought on immediately, already packed, when she left the son's house and when she left the home. It looks planned beforehand – similar incidents have hurt the excellence of a number of this company's superior films. It would take time in life, and a split in the film would have done it. Such things spoil the illusion to a spectator."

Walton of The Moving Picture News, who typically praised Thanhouser films, deviated from the norm by immediately dismissing the film as a whole by stating, "This theme is getting threadbare; a foreign film is almost identical. The son's wife acts brutally to her husband's mother; things are set right by a child. Compare Gaumont's Twilight of a Soldier's Life, etc. The acting of the child is charming, and of the old lady a womanly concept – even to details. The wife's grabbing the old lady's bag, umbrella, etc. was, as one said who sat next to me, 'a bit too rushed.'" This criticism of the theme was accurate because the Gaumont release had a nearly identical plot except that that "grandma" was an elderly soldier. The similarities between the two films likely are coincidental because the Gaumont film was released four days prior.

Q. David Bowers wrote a modern synopsis of the production which contains more details than the official publication from the Thanhouser company. Bowers was present for the showing of this film at Iona College in New Rochelle on October 7, 1988 and stated that the film was met with cheers by an audience of about 400 persons.

A print of the film is preserved in the Library of Congress.
