= Prompt Payment and Stealing a Ride =

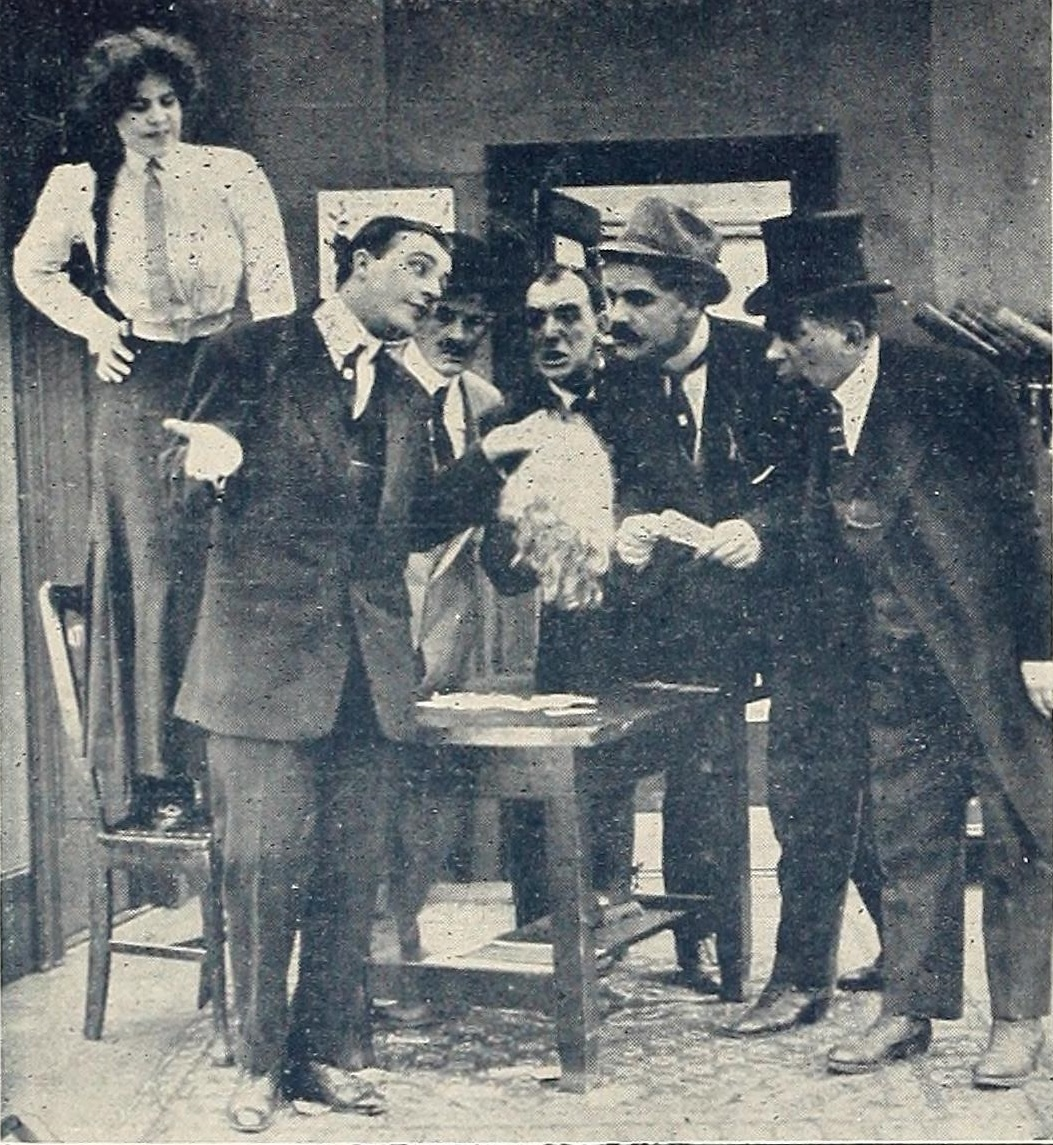
- A film still from Prompt Payment
- Produced by: Thanhouser Company
- Distributed by: Motion Picture Distributing and Sales Company
- Release date: January 27, 1911
- Running time: 1 reel
- Country: United States
- Languages: Silent film English intertitles

Prompt Payment and Stealing a Ride are two 1911 American silent short comedy films produced by the Thanhouser Company. Prompt Payment focuses on a lawyer who evades his creditors, dons a disguise and plays against them in a game of poker. After winning a large sum of money from them, he excuses himself and returns to pay them with their own money. Stealing a Ride is listed as a comedy, but has a clear dramatic element. Susie and Johnnie are out sledding when Susie's parents are about to go out for a sleigh drive. The children ask to come along, but are refused. The children hitch their sleds to the back of the sleigh and follow along, only to fall off and get lost in the woods. The parents later track them down and bring them home. Both films were released together on a single reel on January 27, 1911 and were met with praise by critics. Both films are presumed lost.

== Plots ==
Prompt Payment is a comedy that focuses on a lawyer named Jack who is deeply in debt to a bunch of creditors. The creditors gather together and go to Jack's office to demand repayment and refuse to leave until they are paid. Jack refuses to leave his office and the creditors decide to play poker while they wait. Jack escapes through a fire escape and dons a disguise and approaches them as another unhappy creditor. Jack's skill in the game leads him win a large sum of money from the creditors. Jack excuses himself from the game and returns undisguised to pay the creditors back, much to the creditors rejoicing.

Stealing a Ride follows two children, Susie Gay and Johnnie Eddy, who are out tobogganing on sleds. The two see Susie's parents going out for a drive in a sleigh and ask to come along. The parents refuse and secretly two hitch their sleds behind the sleigh. When going up a hill, Susie loses her grip on her sled and Johnnie tries to save her from falling in vain. The two fall off and are unable to catch up the sleigh. The children wander into the woods and become lost. When Susie's parents discover the empty sleds they turn back and track down the children by the footprints they left in the snow with the aid of a dog. The parents find them asleep in the snow and bring them back home in the sleigh. The children are punished by spanking and then kissed by their parents for their actions.

== Production ==
Unlike many other Thanhouser productions, no details on the director or cast are cited by Q. David Bowers. Prompt Payment was likely shot at the Thanhouser Studio in New Rochelle, New York and Stealing a Ride was likely shot in the surrounding area. Identification of the cast for Prompt Payment may be possible due to a surviving film still that was used in a Thanhouser advertisement. Both films are listed as comedies, despite the more serious nature and dramatic element of two children being lost in the woods during the winter. A detail in a review from The New York Dramatic Mirror states that the children are tracked "to shelter behind some rocks, where the boy had built a fire by which the little girl had gone to sleep. After reaching home each youngster was spanked, but the punishment was eased by hearty kisses." The films are presumed lost because neither film is known to exist by any archive or collector.

== Release and reception ==
Both films were released together on a single reel on January 27, 1911. The first film, Prompt Payment, is approximately 500 feet in length. The second film, Stealing a Ride is listed at 400 feet in length. Both films would receive positive reviews from reviewers. Prompt Payment was praised by The Billboard as an ingenious comedy film that had good photography. A review in The Moving Picture World and a review by Walton of The Moving Picture News both agreed that the subject's comedy of the film was in seeing the lawyer ultimately pay the creditors back with their own money. The New York Dramatic Mirror praised the film, calling it a "capital farce, and it is most effectively presented." Stealing a Ride was met with positive reviews for the clear photography and the realism of the subject which makes for a cautionary tale. In advertisements for the films, Prompt Payment received attention as a good comedy, but the likelihood of a "canned review" having been drawn from a source is hinted at by identical wording by theaters in different states and different chains. Thanhouser films typically had a longer circulation period than other producers, one such late advertisement shows both halves being shown in October 1912.

== Note ==
A thorough search of contemporary sources related to the Prompt Payment work lists a newspaper reporting that a "Miss Lenore" was in the leading role. This citation comes from The Daily Deadwood Pioneer-Times from Deadwood, South Dakota. This is a clear error and Bowers does not list a "Miss Lenore" in the comprehensive biography listing.
