= For Washington =

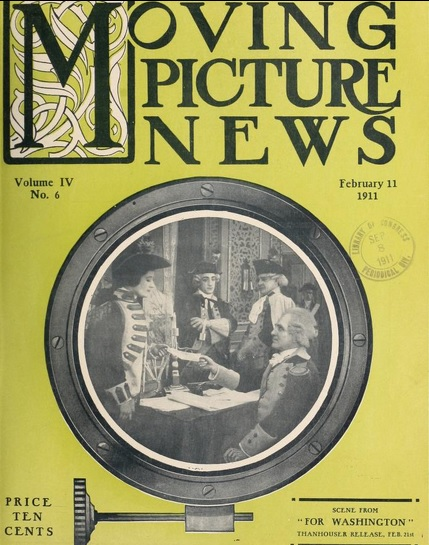
- On the cover of The Motion Picture News
- Produced by: Thanhouser Company
- Distributed by: Motion Picture Distributors and Sales Company
- Release date: February 21, 1911
- Running time: 1 reel (approximately 10 minutes)
- Country: United States
- Languages: Silent film English intertitles

For Washington is a 1911 American silent short historical fiction drama film produced by the Thanhouser Company. The film is a fictional account of how a patriotic maid's home is taken over by Hessian officers in the American Revolutionary War. She hides her hatred of them and plies them with drink before delivering a message to George Washington. She leads them in crossing of the Delaware River and the historic capture. The film's crossing scene was inspired by Emmanuel Leutze's 1851 painting Washington Crossing the Delaware. The film was praised by critics, but the notion that the film was purely a historical fiction was lost on some. The film is presumed lost.

== Plot and production ==
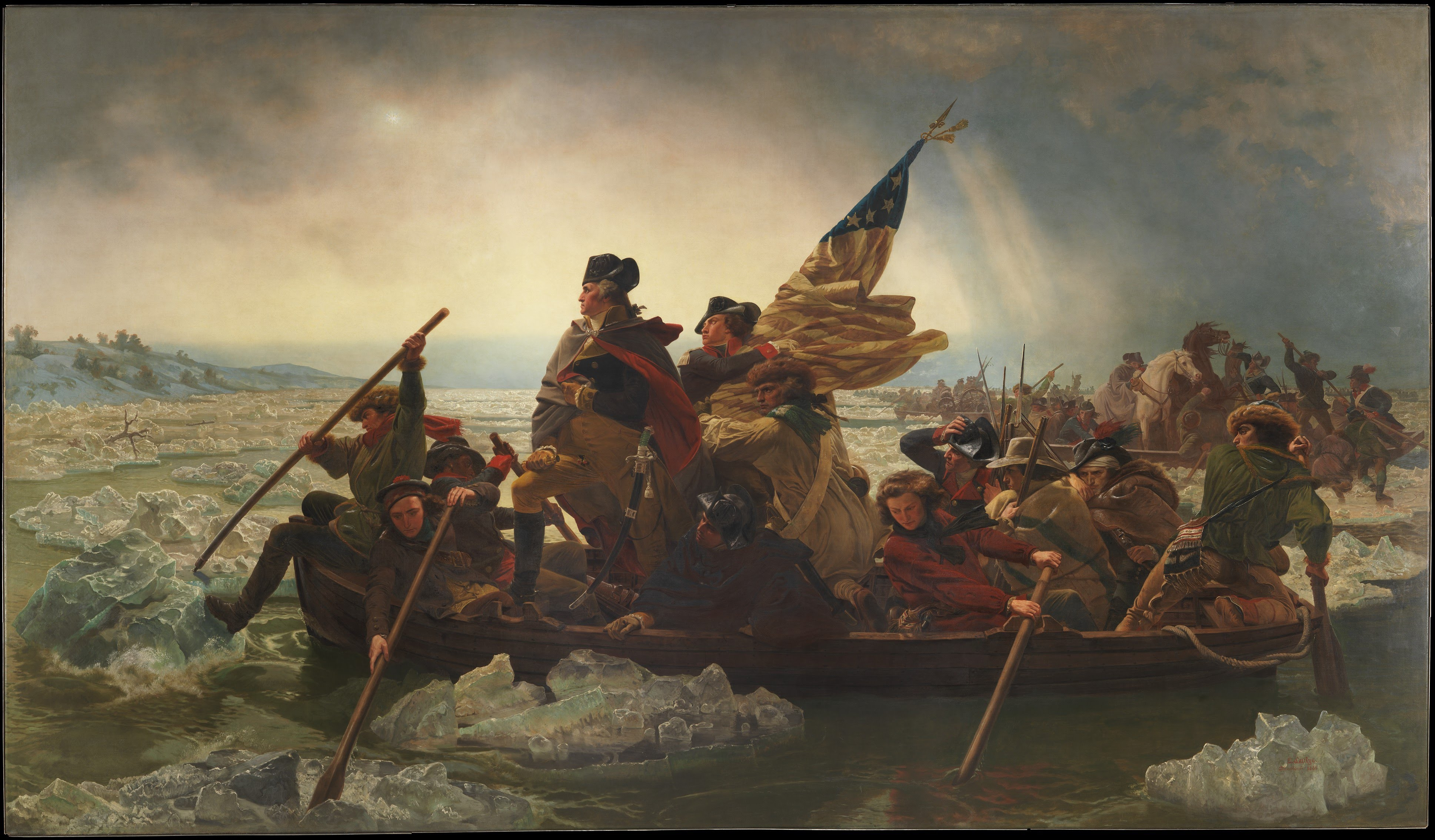
Emmanuel Leutze's 1851 painting Washington Crossing the Delaware was depicted in the film.

The film is a historical fiction of the events leading up to George Washington's crossing of the Delaware River. An official synopsis of the film states: "We all know of Washington's remarkable feat in crossing the Delaware River at Trenton with half of his command, surprising the Hessians and making them his prisoners; but how advance word of helplessness of his enemy reached the great general has ever been a matter of much mystery." There is no historical basis for such a claim as critics would highlight.

The film begins with a maid whose home is occupied by the Hessian officers when they enter Trenton. Despite her hatred of the British red coats she accepts them and by her conduct dismisses their doubts about her loyalty. When they are resigned to a drunken sleep, for which the maid gladly offered, she takes a message from her wounded American sweetheart. She disguises herself and sets off to deliver the message to George Washington. The maid then leads Washington and his men in crossing the icy Delaware River. When they arrive at the maid's home, her wounded sweetheart lets them in so the historic capture can take place.

The film stars Kitty Horn as the maid, but the other actors in the film are unknown. Both the scenario writer and the director of the film are unknown. Produced and released in time for Washington's Birthday, the crossing of the Delaware River was inspired by Emmanuel Leutze's Washington Crossing the Delaware. Though official materials openly postulated as to how Washington received word of the British being weak, Washington's plan was never sporadic and a landing of all the men was not done at the behest of a single maid. American accounts have long held the notion that the Hessian forces would be drunk and sluggish. According to Patriot John Greenwood, who fought in the battle and supervised Hessians afterward, who wrote, "I am certain not a drop of liquor was drunk during the whole night, nor, as I could see, even a piece of bread eaten. The film is presumed lost because the film is not known to be held in any archive or by any collector.

== Release and reception ==
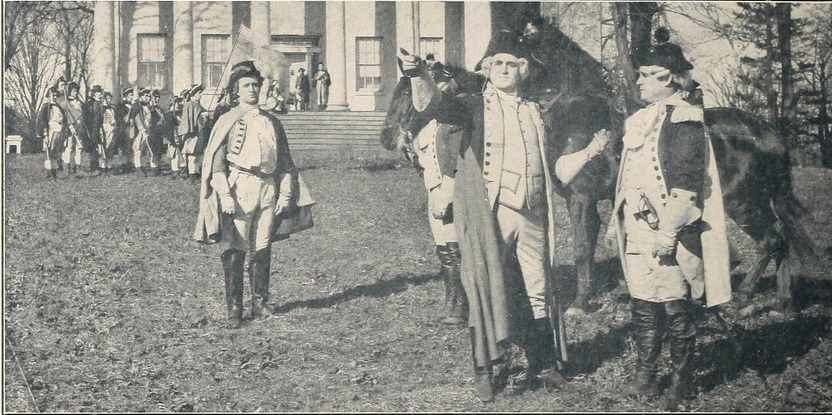
A film still.

The single reel drama, approximately 1,000 feet long, was released on February 21, 1911. The film was originally set to be released under the title The Patriot Maid of '76. The reason for the title change was due to the release by the Rex Motion Picture Company's A Heroine of '76 on February 16, 1911. Though the film bears similarity in title and character, the plots were entirely different. Rex's film was also the first release by the new company. For the release of this patriotic film, Thanhouser made additional efforts for promoting the film in trade publications. A film still was used as the cover illustration on the February 11, 1911 issue of The Moving Picture News and a full-page still would be included in The Moving Picture World's February 11 issue. (Note: The original text of Bowers states: "A scene from the film was the cover illustration on the February 11, 1911 issue of The Moving Picture World. A full-page reproduction of a scene from this film appears on page 284 of the same issue." This is in error because The Moving Picture News used the cover image on that date and The Moving Picture World does not.)

Reviews of the film were mostly positive, but there was some confusion of critics which did not know how to respond to the film. Some critics took it for a historical film instead of a historical fiction. The New York Dramatic Mirror was one such outlet, which stated that they could not verify the authenticity of the story, but found the picture was excellent and artistic. Ever the one to highlight technical faults, the Mirror highlighted the original paintings error in the use of the flag as well as the film's omission of snow. The Morning Telegraph understood the historical fiction being presented and praised the production though they also highlighted technical issues in the splitting of the troops on the landing and the poor pulling of a prop cannon. The Billboard praised the film's acting and photography, but did not specifically refer to whether the film was fictional when it stated, "An incident from history at the period of the Revolution is the makeup of this picture." Some of the highest praise was given by the reviewer of The Moving Picture World which stated, "The story is so well told that the audience is held almost spellbound in places as the reel moves through the changing scenes. It is admirably done, staging, acting and photography combining to make an exceptionally attractive picture of this patriotic subject."
