= Everybody Saves Father and The Only Girl in Camp =

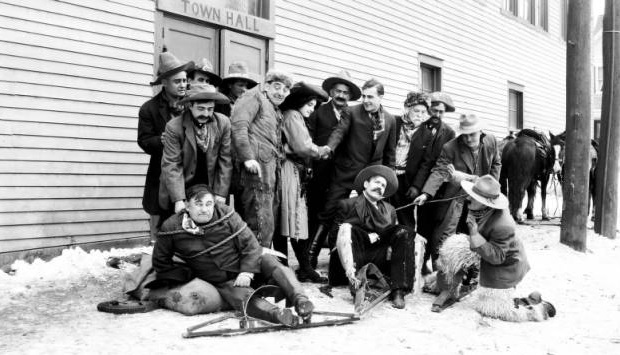
- A film still from the Only Girl in Camp
- Produced by: Thanhouser Company
- Distributed by: Motion Picture Distributing and Sales Company
- Release date: January 10, 1911
- Running time: 1 reel
- Country: United States
- Languages: Silent film English inter-titles

Everybody Saves Father and The Only Girl in Camp are two 1910 American silent short films produced by the Thanhouser Company. Both films were released together on a single reel on January 10, 1911. Everybody Saves Father is a comedy focusing on a father whose life is planned to be saved by a succession of his daughter's suitors. The plan of each of the three men work, foiling the attempts of the other, but a four suitor has wed the daughter whilst the scheming was done by the others. The Only Girl in Camp is a drama film focusing on the only girl in a mining town who foils an armed robbery with the use of bear traps. In 2009, The Only Girl in Camp was identified and deposited into the Library of Congress for preservation. The only known credits for the production come from film stills from the film. The reviews for Everybody Saves Father were positive, but The Only Girl in Camp was met with more or less neutral reception.

== Plots ==
The official synopsis for both films was published in The Moving Picture World on January 14, 1911. The first film, Everybody Saves Father is focused on Jennie Gear, a young woman whose affections are sought by many men. Jennie's father thinks his daughter is too young to be married and drives off four of her suitors. One of the men, John, concocts a plan to save his life to win the man's approval. The plan is heard by another suitor, George, who decides to hire a rowboat to save the old man himself. This is overheard by George who concocts his own rescue to foil George. The plans go through without failure as each successive suitor's plan works to the actions of the other, and Henry wins the approval of Jennie's father. However, Jennie had already married Bill in the meantime.

The Only Girl in Camp

The second film, The Only Girl in Camp, focuses on Trapper Gates's daughter, who is the only woman in the mining camp. Three ruffians come across the camp and plan to rob the miners. The leader, Bill, announces himself as Professor Watson and says he will give a lecture on locating gold deposits in the town hall. All the miners are lured to the building, save the girl, and Bill's accomplices proceed to rob the men. She realizes that this meeting is unusual and goes to the town hall and witnesses the robbery, but has no way of reporting or stopping the three armed men. Struck with an idea, she returns home for her father's bear traps and sets them on the steps of town hall. The robbers back out of the town hall and step into the traps, where they are captured.

== Cast and production ==
Film historian Q. David Bowers does not cite credits for Everybody Saves Father. Though Bowers does not cite credits for The Only Girl in Camp, the rediscovered film and identification of film stills have provided credit for Frank H. Crane, William Garwood, Violet Heming and Tom Fortune. (Note: When Thanhouser Films: An Encyclopedia and History was published in 1995, the film was believed to have been lost and contemporary publications yielded no credits. The film was identified and sold on eBay. A film still in the Jonathan Silent Film Collection makes the cast identification.) The other cast credits are unknown, but many Thanhouser productions are fragmentary. In late 1910, the Thanhouser company released a list of the important personalities in their films. The list includes G.W. Abbe, Justus D. Barnes, Frank H. Crane, Irene Crane, Marie Eline, Violet Heming, Martin J. Faust, Thomas Fortune, George Middleton, Grace Moore, John W. Noble, Anna Rosemond, Mrs. George Walters.

The writer of the scenarios was most likely Lloyd Lonergan. He was an experienced newspaperman employed by The New York Evening World while writing scripts for the Thanhouser productions. The film director may have been Barry O'Neil or Lucius J. Henderson. The role of the cameraman was uncredited in 1910 productions though cameramen employed by the company during this era included Blair Smith, Alfred H. Moses, Jr. and Carl Louis Gregory.

== Release and reception ==
Everybody Saves Father and The Only Girl in Camp were released together on a single reel, approximately 1,000 feet in length, on January 10, 1911. The total length of Everybody Saves Father is approximately 450 feet long and the Only Girl in Camp is 480 feet long. Though both films were on a split reel, sometimes the films were advertised independently or listed Everybody Saves Father only. Theaters showing the one or possibly both films are known in North Carolina Indiana, Texas, Kansas, Arizona, Pennsylvania, and California. A surviving nitrate print of The Only Girl in Camp was sold on eBay in 2009. The film was purchased and deposited in the Library of Congress for preservation.

Everybody Saves Father was met with positive reviews in the trade publications. The Billboard review stated, "The comedy is distinctively American and makes a good subject. The photography is excellent and the acting clever." The Moving Picture World affirmed that it was a good lively and laughable comedy. The two reviews were also backed by The New York Dramatic Mirror's positive review of the comedy production. The publications would also review The Only Girl in Camp were more or less neutral, but The Billboard highlighted how the prop traps could not believably work and hold a man as they did in the film. The Moving Picture World and The New York Dramatic Mirror offered praise for the novelty of the production without any criticism.

== See also ==
- List of American films of 1910
