= Bertie's Brainstorm =

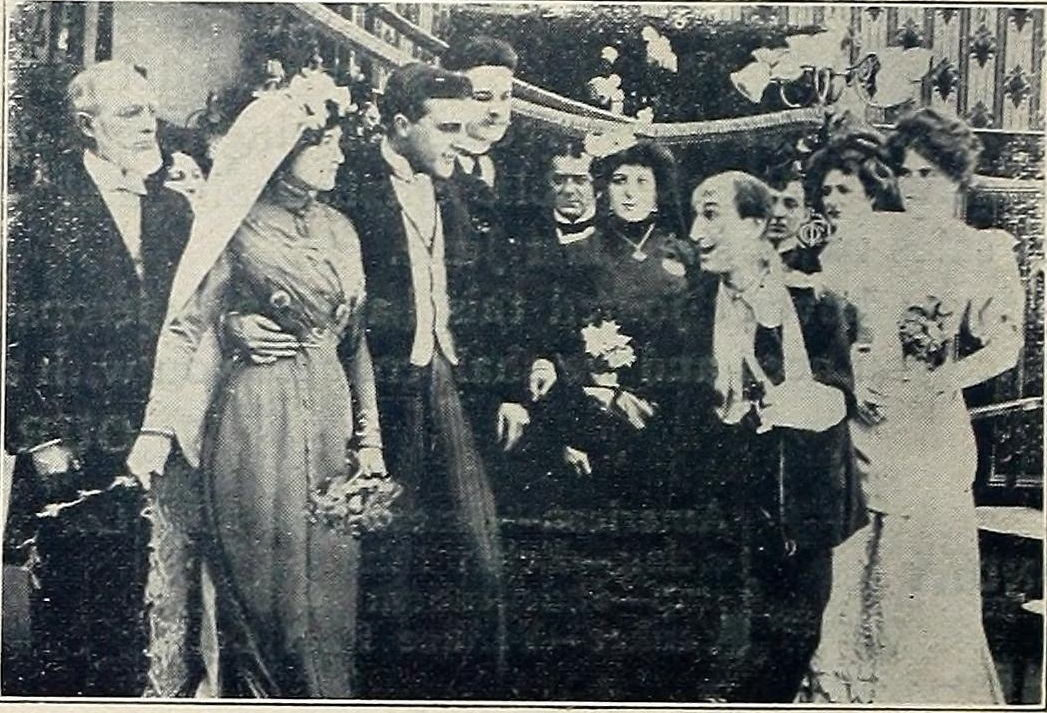
- A surviving film still
- Produced by: Thanhouser Company
- Distributed by: Motion Picture Distributing and Sales Company
- Release date: January 17, 1911
- Running time: 1 reel
- Country: United States
- Languages: Silent film English inter-titles

Bertie's Brainstorm is a 1911 American silent short drama film produced by the Thanhouser Company. The film focuses on Bertie Fawcett, a dim-witted fop, who erroneously believes to have won the heart of May Vernon. In reality, May loves Jack and the two are set to be married, but May's father wishes he would prove his worth by earning his own living. Bertie chances upon the letter and sets off to make a living proceeds through a number of jobs with hope to claim May as his bride. The film ends with Bertie returning and finding out that May has married Jack. Little is known about the production of the film save that William Russell played an unknown role and that the scenario was written by Lloyd F. Lonergan. The foppish character of Bertie may have been inspired by Edwin Thanhouser's role as Bertie Nizril in Thoroughbred. Originally conceived as a series, this ultimately singular work received praise from critics. The film is presumed lost.

== Plot ==
An official synopsis published in the Billboard states, "Bertie Fawcett is a dudish chap, who believes that he has won the heart of May Vernon. May, however, regards Bertie as very much of a joke, and is in love with Jack Mace, who is her ideal of manly beauty. May's father has no objection to Jack personally, but he does not propose that the daughter he idolizes shall wed a weakling or a ne'er do well. Therefore, he tells May in a letter that if 'that young man wants to marry you, he must show his ability by earning his own living during vacation.' Unfortunately for Bertie, he sees the letter, and egotistically jumps to the conclusion that he is the person referred to. He starts out to make his own living, but soon finds that it is not as easy as it sounds. He is successfully a writer, a billposter, a village constable, and a living target in the baseball show, but fails to shine in any one sphere. And then to cap the climax, when he returns to claim his bride, he finds that May is married to Jack."

== Production ==
The only known actor in the production for William Russell in an unknown role. A surviving film still appears to show Russell in the role of Jack at the climax of the film in which Bertie encounters the newly married couple. The other cast credits are unknown, but many Thanhouser productions are fragmentary. In late 1910, the Thanhouser company released a list of the important personalities in their films. The list includes G.W. Abbe, Justus D. Barnes, Frank H. Crane, Irene Crane, Marie Eline, Violet Heming, Martin J. Faust, Thomas Fortune, George Middleton, Grace Moore, John W. Noble, Anna Rosemond, Mrs. George Walters. The scenario was written by Lloyd F. Lonergan and the character of Bertie may have been based on Edwin Thanhouser's role of Bertie Nizril from Thoroughbred. The play was a three-act comedy by Ralph Lumley and was first produced on February 13, 1895. The play would come to the Garrick Theatre in New York City on August 17, 1896 and Edwin Thanhouser took over the role on August 29, 1896. A series of Bertie films was projected, but only this work was produced. Two other announced works included Bertie's Bride and Bertie's Baby.

== Release and reception ==
The single reel drama, approximately 1,000 feet long, was released on January 17, 1911. The film received favorable reviews from Billboard, The Moving Picture World and The New York Dramatic Mirror. Billboard would write, "The adventures of the unfortunate Bertie are such as will make the usual motion picture audience chuckle with appreciation. The film is, of course, a farce essentially. The photography is well up to the Thanhouser standard." Walton of the Moving Picture News, would quip, "This beats the brainstorm in Les Miserables. It is a Doré nightmare." The comedic farce of the dim-witted fop proved to be successful if ultimately singular release of an expected series of films. The film is presumed lost because the film is not known to be held in any archive or by any collector.
