= Jenks' Day Off =

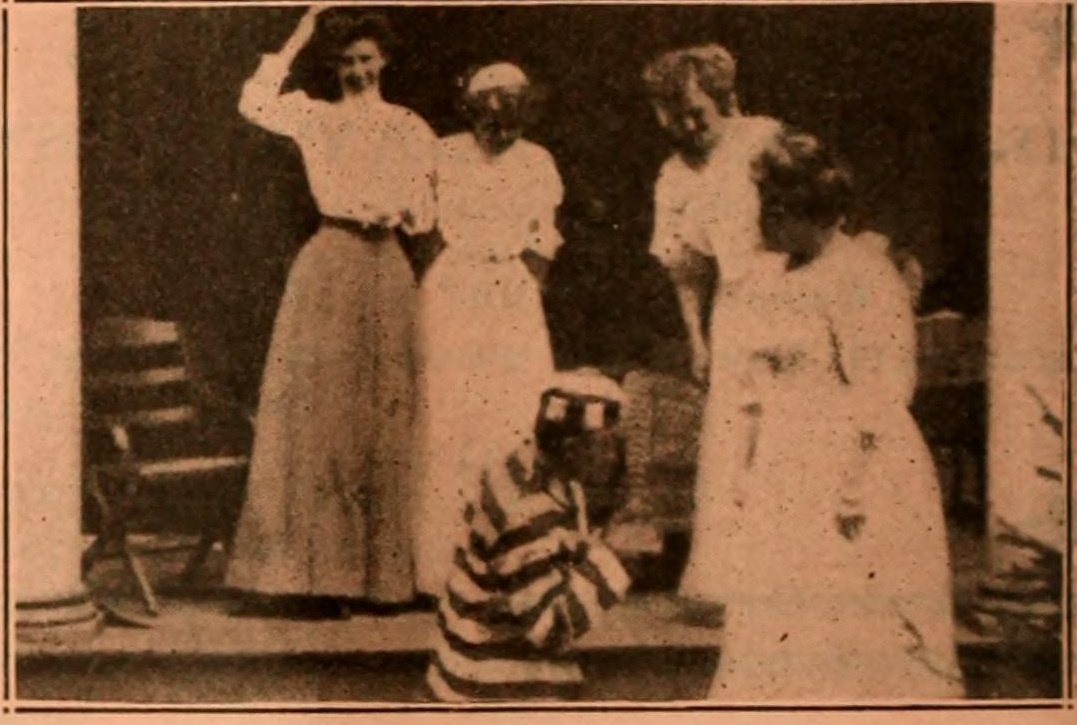
- A surviving film still
- Produced by: Thanhouser Company
- Release date: August 2, 1910
- Country: United States
- Languages: Silent film English intertitles

Jenks' Day Off is a 1910 American silent short comedy produced by the Thanhouser Company. The film follows Mr. Jenks who drafts a telegram to himself as an excuse to get a reprieve from boredom and his wife's requests. He walks along the beach and finds a secluded spot to go swimming. A convict in women's clothing swaps his clothes with Jenks and Jenks has no choice to but to wear the discarded clothes. On his way back, he answers a call for help and is mistaken for the robber. He is captured and has to explain the circumstances which lead to an awkward situation. Production and casting credits for the film are unknown, but likely Thanhouser staff offer possible identities of the writer and actors. The film was released on August 2, 1910 and was met with approval by the trade publication. The film is presumed lost.

== Plot ==
Though the film is presumed lost, a synopsis survives in The Moving Picture World from August 6, 1910. It states: "Mr. Jenks and his family are spending the summer in a fashionable summer hotel, and Mr. Jenks is kept bored and busy performing the many services demanded by his wife. He hits upon the bright idea of sending himself a business telegram which would necessitate his immediate presence in the city, then starts out on a little vacation on his own account. Walking on the beach he discovers a secluded spot, and leaving his clothes on the beach he takes a swim. In the meantime, a convict, who has escaped from a nearby penitentiary, has entered a house nearby in search of a change of clothes, his stripes being too conspicuous. The convict locks a woman of the house up and ransacks the house, but the only garments he can find are women's clothes, and, deciding that they are better than stripes, he dons them. As the convict in his new disguise is walking along the beach he sees Jenks' clothes lying there and promptly makes another change. There is nothing for Jenks to do when he comes out except to array himself as a woman. On his way back to the hotel he passes the house that has been robbed and is unlucky enough to hear the woman's cry for help. When she gets out of the closet, through his aid, she naturally believes that he is the convict, and screams for help. Jenks, frightened, runs away, but is captured after a chase in which the entire village takes part. His wife and daughter witness humiliation, and it's almost impossible for them to 'square things.'"

== Production ==
The writer of the scenario is unknown, but it was most likely Lloyd Lonergan. He was an experienced newspaperman employed by The New York Evening World while writing scripts for the Thanhouser productions. The comedy of the situation derives from Jenks' own attempts to manufacture some free time to enjoy himself, only to regret the action because of the resultant circumstances. Advertising for the film confirms this by stating, "Jenk's day off was a day of woe instead of the day of joy he meant it to be. It taught him to never, never leave his wife's side - not even for a day!" Jenks' swimming in a secluded spot, inferring swimming in the nude through the lack of a swimming suit, sets the stage for the comedy when his clothes are swapped for those of the cross-dressed convict. With no other option, Jenks dons the clothes and responds to the call for help. The lady identifies Jenks as the convict, wearing her clothes, and the film concludes with a chase that leads to the arrest and humiliation of Jenks. This comedy predates the well-known cross-dressing antics of Fatty Arbuckle and Charlie Chaplin by a few years. The film director is unknown, but it may have been Barry O'Neil. Film historian Q. David Bowers does not attribute a cameraman for this production, but at least two possible candidates exist. Blair Smith was the first cameraman of the Thanhouser company, but he was soon joined by Carl Louis Gregory who had years of experience as a still and motion picture photographer. The role of the cameraman was uncredited in 1910 productions. The cast is uncredited because their identities are unknown. Bowers states that most of the credits are fragmentary for 1910 Thanhouser productions. Known and more prominent members of the cast to appear in productions include the leading ladies, Anna Rosemond and Violet Heming, and the leading man was Frank H. Crane.

== Release and reception ==
The one reel comedy, approximately 960 feet long, was released on August 2, 1910. An alternative title for the production, Jenk's Day Off, was included in several known Thanhouser advertisements. This would appear to be in error because the character's name is Jenks and not Jenk. Theaters advertising the film included those in Missouri, Indiana, Nebraska, and Arizona. The Morning Telegraph gave a positive review to the film, stating that it was a "pretty good story". The Moving Picture World mirrored this assessment with a bit more detail and referred to the story as being within the realm of reality which makes it funnier. The New York Dramatic Mirror provided the most detailed review of the film and praised the ingenuity of the plot and the acting with the exception of Jenks' wife. The reviewer also pointing out that Jenks wrote out the telegram too quickly.

== See also ==
- List of American films of 1910
