= A Newsboy Hero =

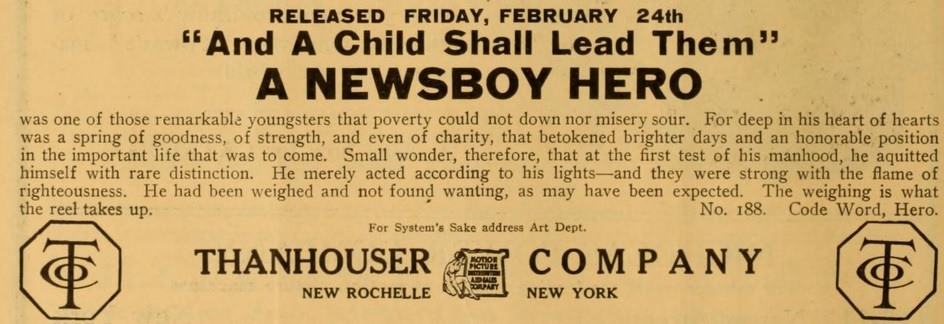
- Advertising for the film in The Moving Picture World
- Produced by: Thanhouser Company
- Distributed by: Motion Picture Distributors and Sales Company
- Release date: February 24, 1911
- Running time: 1 reel
- Country: United States
- Languages: Silent film English intertitles

A Newsboy Hero is an American silent short drama film produced by the Thanhouser Company. A standard melodrama, it has the alcoholic John Bailey return home in a drunken state. He strikes his wife and by this act drives his wife and child from the house. They go out into the snow and fall asleep, but are saved by a newspaper boy and taken home. John searches for them, but believes they are dead after reading a newspaper story and decides to commit suicide. He is saved by a member of the Salvation Army and then is reunited with his family. The only known credit in the production is that of Marie Eline as the couple's child, Marie. The film was released on February 24, 1911, and it received mixed reviews by critics over its melodramatic plot, but the actors strong skills was the strongest redeeming factor in the negative reviews. The film is presumed lost.

== Plot ==
The film is a melodrama focuses on a young working man named John Bailey (alternatively Jack). His alcoholism had caused much strife in his home and his wife, May, prays and pleads for him to stop drinking. One night he returns home in a drunken state and strikes her. His wife decides to leave with their child, Marie and goes out into the world without help. They wander in the snow and become exhausted and fall asleep. They are saved from certain death by a cripple newspaper boy named Jim Sands. He brings them back to his home and they take refuge with Jim's poor family. Realizing his mistake, John searches for his wife and child in vain until he sees a newspaper story (claimed to be two weeks later) about the death of a woman and child in the storm. Believing May and Marie are dead, he decides to commit suicide by drowning himself. He is saved by Jim, a member of the Salvation Army and decides that he has to atone for his sins. Jim learns of John and May's relation and reunites family again.

== Production ==
The only known credit in the production is that of Marie Eline as the child, Marie. Thanhouser films, as moral as they were, did not depict the actual violence which would be formally alluded to in the synopsis. The New York Dramatic Mirror's reviewer would state that the male lead was drunk and stated that he did not drive them from the house. There was no depiction of any violence towards the wife or apparent mention by inter-title of any physical abuse. The synopsis published describes what was not shown, but it also gives names that were not provided for audiences. Thanhouser's advertising for the film included the tag line "And a child shall lead them", which is a reference to Isaiah 11:6.

== Release and reception ==
The single reel drama, approximately 1,000 feet long, was released on February 24, 1911. The film had mixed reviews from critics. The New York Dramatic Mirror reviewer was thorough in the analysis of the film who did not like the production for its poor rehashed story and maudlin melodrama. The characters behavior was not logical and the series of events relied on deus ex machina elements, such as the Salvation Army suddenly decides to march down to the water's edge, then stop and remain in the background so that they can save his soul at the opportune moment. The reviewer did state that the acting was good. The Billboard' review agreed that the story was implausible, but agreed that the skill of the actors made it more plausible than it otherwise would have been. The Morning Telegraph and Walton of The Moving Picture News would praise the film for its pathos and heart. The film is presumed lost because the film is not known to be held in any archive or by any collector.
