= The Girl Strike Leader =

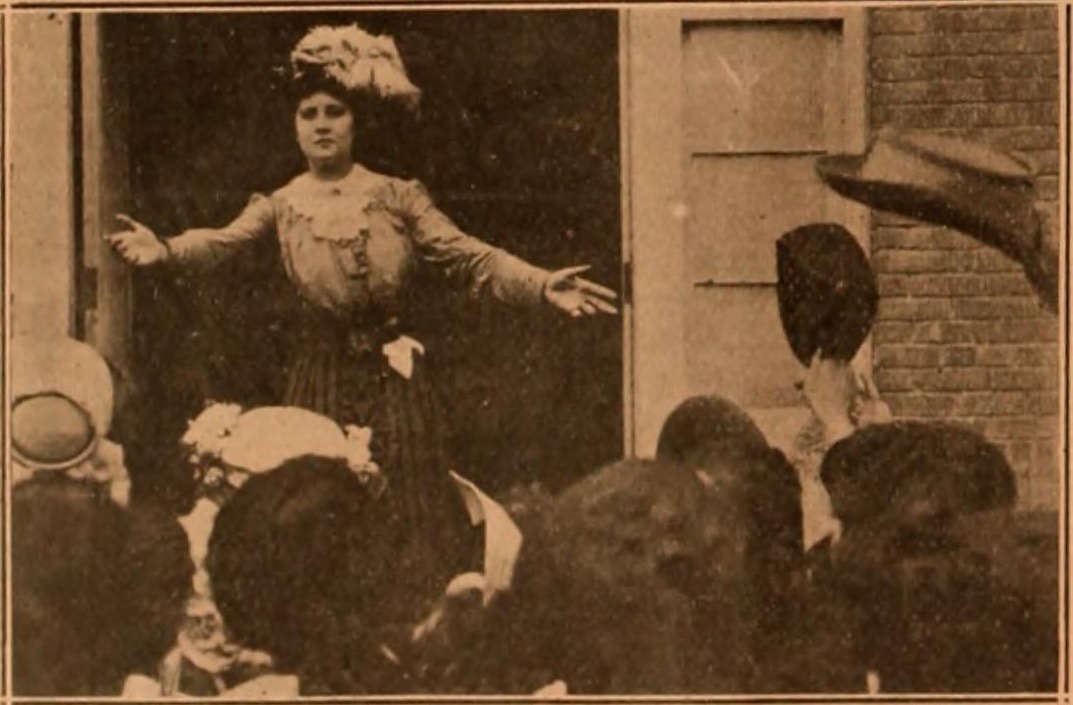
- A film still from The Girl Strike Leader
- Produced by: Thanhouser Company
- Release date: July 8, 1910
- Country: United States
- Languages: Silent film English intertitles

The Girl Strike Leader is a 1910 American silent short drama film produced by the Thanhouser Company. The film deals with labor relations when Hal Stephens disguises himself and works in a factory he was given by his father. As a laborer, he falls in love with a young working girl named Lou and protects her against a manager. Lou leads a strike when wages are ordered to be cut by 10%, but the strikers return to work on the verge of starvation. Lou, who resists, is saved by Hal who assumes control, restores the wages and removes the previous manager.

The film may have been inspired by the real 1909 strike of the New York City shirtwaist makers, but the strike ended without settlement. The scenario is bears the hallmarks of the successful dime novels with an improbable resolution. Released on July 8, 1910, the film has received attention for presenting labor issues, but the film is presumed lost.

== Plot ==
Though the film is presumed lost, a synopsis survives in The Moving Picture World from July 9, 1910. It states: "Hal Stephens, a wealthy young man, devotes all his time to enjoying himself, thereby earns the disapproval of his staid old father. The elder Stephen sees the young man start off on an auto trip with some gay friends, and decides to call a halt. (Note: The usage of "gay" is not referring to homosexuality, but more a carefree or jovial nature. Hal Stephens' friends - like him - are carefree and without responsibilities.) He notifies his son by telegram that it is time he went to work, and presents him with the factory. This arouses the merriment of his friends, but Hal declares that he will buckle down and go to work. He tells his father, however, that he desires to start incognito, and the father consents. Hal enters the factory and goes to work as an ordinary laborer, his identity being unknown to all. He meets Lou, a young working girl, and falls in love with her. The manager of the place, one Conners, tries to make love to Lou, and Hal protects her. (Note: This appears to be a euphemism for attempted rape.) There is an order put up reducing salaries 10%, and Lou induces the others to strike rather than to submit. The strikers, starved out, finally return to work, with the exception of Lou, who is defiant to the end. Hal finds her weeping on the steps of her home and tells her of his love. She agrees to marry him. After she has accepted him, he leads her to the factory, announces his identity, assumes possession, and restores wages to the old scale, after having discharged the rogue Conners."

== Production ==
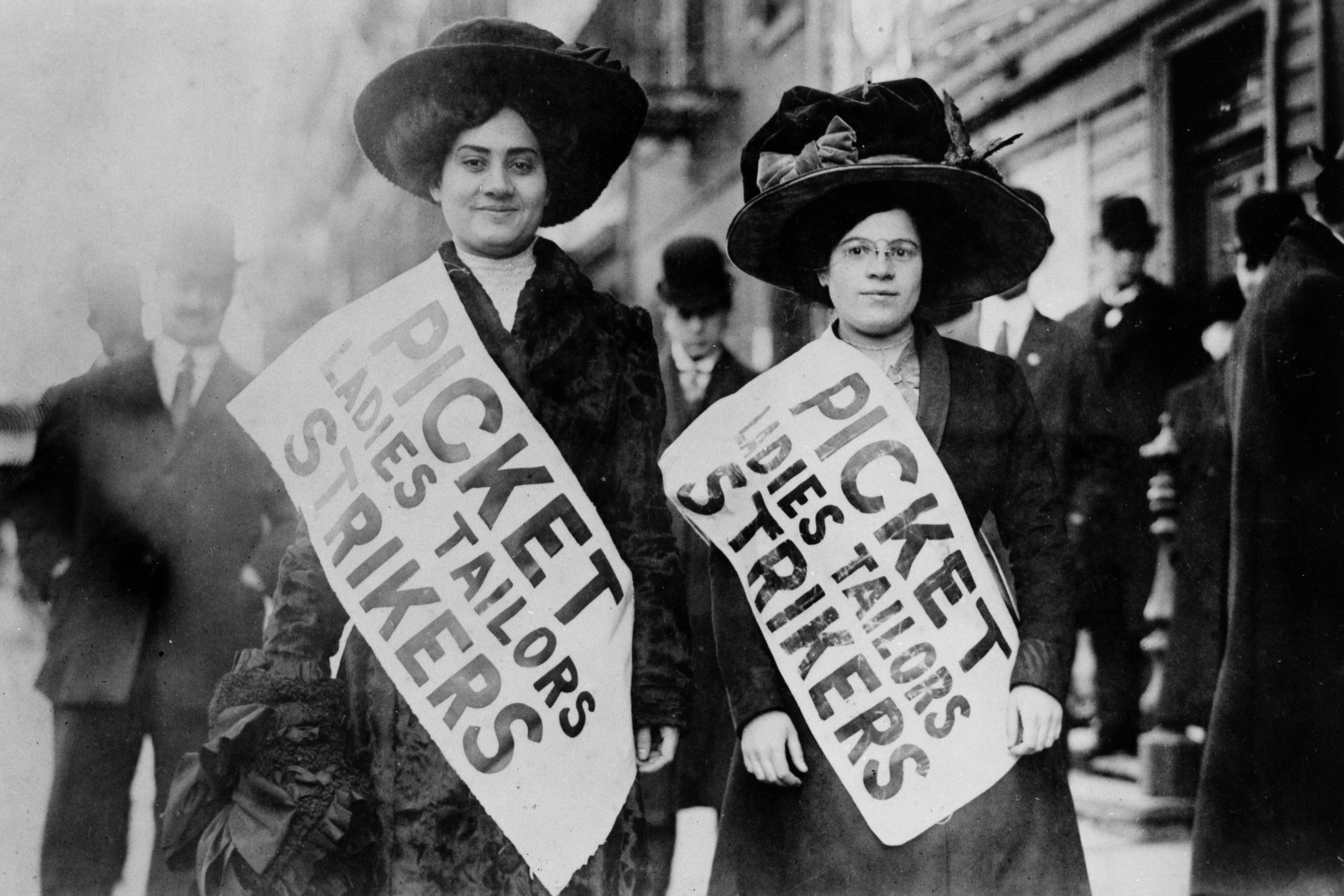
Female tailors on strike, New York City, February, 1910.

The writer of the scenario is unknown, but it was most likely Lloyd Lonergan. Lonergan was an experienced newspaperman employed by The New York Evening World while writing scripts for the Thanhouser productions. Michael S. Shull, author of Radicalism in American Silent Films, 1909-1929: A Filmography and History, believes the scenario was inspired by a New York City shirtwaist makers strike that began in the winter of 1909. The strike would end without settlement, but it would be dramatized by Theresa Malkiel, a labor activist. The fictional autobiography written by Malkiel, The Diary of a Shirtwaist Striker, was serialized in New York Caller a socialist paper. The film director is unknown, but it may have been Barry O'Neil. Bowers does not attribute a cameraman for this production, but two possible candidates exist. Blair Smith was the first cameraman of the Thanhouser company, but he was soon joined by Carl Louis Gregory who had years of experience as a still and motion picture photographer. The role of the cameraman was uncredited in 1910 productions. The only credit known for the cast is that of Mrs. George W. Walters in the role of a poor factory worker. Other members cast may have included the other leading players of the Thanhouser productions, Anna Rosemond, Frank H. Crane and Violet Heming.

== Release and reception ==
The single reel drama, approximate 1000 feet long, was released on July 8, 1910. (Note: One advertisement erroneously said it was released on July 10, 1910.) Theaters in Indiana and Pennsylvania were among those which advertised the film, one specifically focusing on the film having dealing with "the labor question". A review in The Moving Picture News was contained detailed praise of the film's relevance and success in portraying the subject. The reviewer states, "This film strikes home. ... The situation has been lived in New York City. The strike and its miseries are not forgotten. Whoever arranged the story had a big, tender heart and knew what appeals to the masses. The glee with which the superintendent's discomfiture was hailed by the audience spoke volumes. We wish some of the pictures were not quite so vividly black and white. Mayhap the tenseness of the situation hit the cameraman. Be that as it may, one thing is certain - there is no melodrama, but scenes out of real life." While the reviewer in this case refers to the scenario being drawn from real life, the happy ending is termed as a fantasy by reviewer in The Moving Picture World who states, "[It is one] of those pictures which thrill one despite their improbability. It may go in stories but never in fact, that an owner of a factory marries one of his girl employees, and a strike leader at that..."

Nan Enstad, author of Ladies of Labor, Girls of Adventure: Working Women, Popular Culture, and Labor Politics at the Turn of the Twentieth Century says that the film relied on the dime novel formula as much as the labor-capital conventions to depict its story. Kay Sloan, author of The Loud Silents: Origins of the Social Problem Film, confirms that the simplified plot of the film is of the dime novel order. (Note: Sloan erroneously states that this was a 1913 film.) Barbara Antoniazzi, author of The Wayward Woman: Progressivism, Prostitution, and Performance in the United States, 1888–1917, highlights that the girls are striking against the actions of Connor instead of the owner and that Lou is portrayed as attractive, defiant and virtuous. Steven J. Ross would cite this film as the first in a list of films that would progressively depict female labor activists as the agent of justice in contrast to the gender biases of film makers.

== See also ==
- List of American films of 1910
