= Stage Struck (1911 film) =

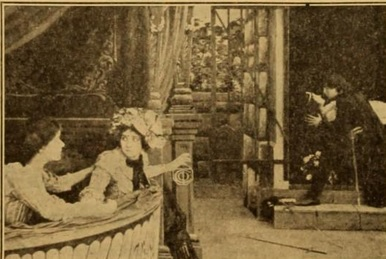
- A surviving film still
- Produced by: Thanhouser Company
- Starring: Marie Eline
- Distributed by: Motion Picture Distributors and Sales Company
- Release date: March 3, 1911
- Running time: 1 reel
- Country: United States
- Languages: Silent film English intertitles

Stage Struck is an American silent short drama film produced by the Thanhouser Company. The film focuses on a country girl who joins a traveling production after the company performs in her home town. She runs away from her home to join them and is hired, but the hard life soon takes it toll and she is unable to continue on with them. A traveling sales man buys her a ticket home and she goes home to her father. Several weeks later she receives a letter offering her a position in a New York theater production and a letter requesting her marriage from the salesman. She decides to accept his offer and become his wife. The film was released on March 3, 1911 and was met with good reviews, but the film's intended daydream sequence was not understood by critics. The film is presumed lost.

== Plot ==
The official summary synopsis of the film was published in The Moving Picture World. It states, "A country girl becomes hopelessly stage struck when a company of barnstorming actors, presenting Shakespearean plays, appears in her home town. She applies for an engagement to the star of the organization and is finally offered a small part. Forbidden by her father to follow the career of her choice, she runs away and joins the company. Disillusionment soon follows. The stars dissatisfied with her attempts at acting, and the hard work and bad hotels soon tax her strength. While playing a one-night stand in a little town, the company is treated to a square meal by a prosperous young drummer [Slang: for a traveling salesman] who is greatly attracted by the country girl's youth and beauty. The company get into financial straits, and have their baggage seized. Entirely without funds they start to walk to the next town. 'Walking the ties' is as new form of exercise for our heroine, and halfway on the journey she begs the company to go on without her, as she is too weary and sick to continue. Sitting alone and weeping bitterly on the steps of a forlorn little railway station, the girl is surprised to see, getting off the train, her new acquaintance, the drummer. He insists upon buying her a ticket for home and starting her off at once. The girl is welcomed back home by her father and when a few weeks later she receives together an offer of a New York engagement and an offer of marriage from the young drummer - she decides to accept the latter, and to appear in the future as - just a wife."

== Production ==
The only credit in the production is that of Marie Eline in an unknown role. A review of the film in The Moving Picture World would state the representation of the standard theatrical company was extremely good. This was not by chance, for many key persons at the Thanhouser company, including Edwin Thanhouser himself, had experience on the stage. Edwin Thanhouser knew the stage represented a great pool of acting talent, but many actors were regular citizenry, yet anonymity was the rule until towards 1912 and so on until the "star system" would come to force around 1914.

== Release and reception ==
The single reel drama, approximately 1,000 feet long, was released on March 3, 1911. The Billboard's reviewer gave a positive review and asserted, "Any motion picture in which the views of 'back on the stage' are shown possesses a certain degree of interest. The ever-curious public is fascinated by the alluring stories of the stage world, and any peep it is given into this realm is welcomed. Because of this, Stage Struck derives the interest it has. As far as the story is concerned there is no special recommendation for it. ... The theatre settings are about as faithful depictions of stage scenes as are found in motion pictures. The player portraying the role of the leading actor very much exaggerates in makeup. The photography is very good." Both The Morning Telegraph and The New York Dramatic Mirror thought the conclusion was impossible turn of events. The Telegraph's reviewer wrote, "An excellent opportunity was sadly missed for the exposition of a strong lesson to the uninitiated girl or boy who dreams of a career before the footlights. How any author or producer could permit such an impossible ending is a wonder. Can any sensible person imagine a New York manager offering an inexperienced amateur a leading part in a Broadway production? Yet this is what occurs in this tale of a stage-struck miss who joins a repertoire company, is stranded, gets home through the generosity of a traveling salesman and then, with no lapse of time or experience noted, receives a letter with such an offer! Most of the play was well put on and ably acted. The 'star' of the theatrical company wore an abominable wig, which could be distinguished as false. More care and thought would have made this an admirable offering." The Mirror' reviewer stated, "The production leaves the impression of being exceedingly well done, but to the average actor the New York engagement, after forsaking her barnstorming company of players, seems somewhat of a dream. It was also startling to see her playing Ophelia after such a flat failure at the previous rehearsal where another took her place." According to the synopsis, it is likely that this New York production in which she foresees herself on stage as Ophelia is a dream because it is prompted by the two letters she received at home.

The film is presumed lost because the film is not known to be held in any archive or by any collector.
