= Paul and Virginia (film) =

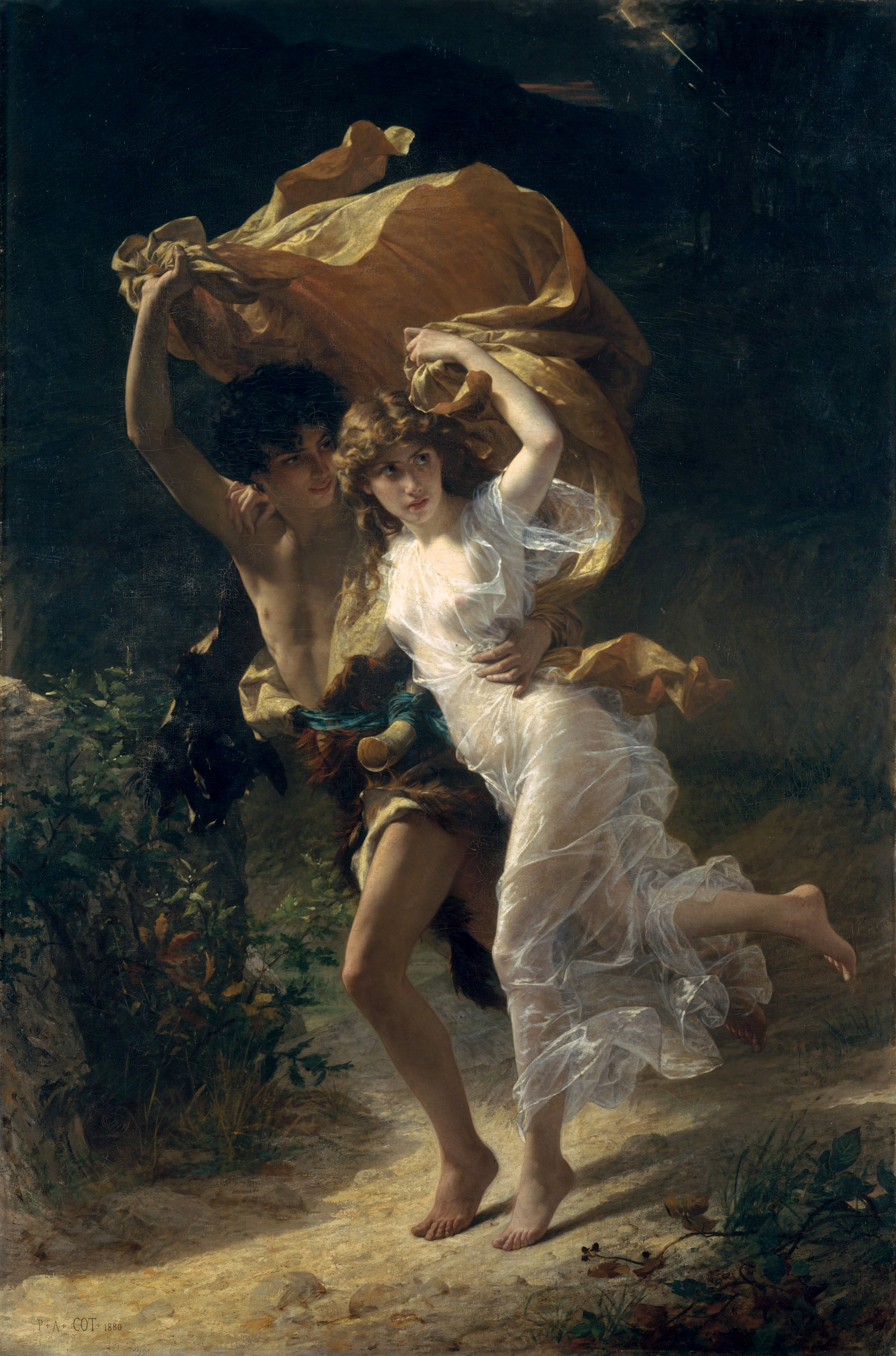
- Thanhouser used Pierre Auguste Cot's The Storm to advertise the film.
- Produced by: Thanhouser Company
- Distributed by: Motion Picture Distributing and Sales Company
- Release date: November 15, 1910
- Country: United States
- Languages: Silent film English intertitles

Paul and Virginia is a 1910 American silent short drama produced by the Thanhouser Company. The film was adapted from Jacques-Henri Bernardin de Saint-Pierre' novel Paul et Virginie and features Frank H. Crane and Violet Heming as the title characters. The film follows two young lovers who grew up living on an island in the Indies. When Virginia is 16, her wealthy aunt in Paris offers to make Virginia her heir and educate her. With her mother's pleading, Virginia accepts and goes to France. Her aunt insists that she marry a rich nobleman, but Virginia refuses, is disowned and sent back home. The ship returns home in a hurricane and she drowns, with Paul nearly dying in a vain attempt to save her. Released on November 15, 1910, the film received mixed reviews in trade publications. The film was advertised with Pierre Auguste Cot's The Storm painting, said to have been inspired by the original novel. The title characters' costumes also appear to be based on Cot's painting. The film is presumed lost.

== Plot ==
Though the film is presumed lost, a synopsis survives in The Moving Picture World from November 19, 1910. It states: "Paul and Virginia are two young lovers who have grown up together from babyhood. Their widowed mothers lived near each other in rude cottages, on an island in the Indies, on which there are few inhabitants. Here the children are reared, knowing no play fellows but each other. When Virginia is 16 years of age, her mother receives a letter from a wealthy aunt in Paris, who offers to make Virginia her heir and give her a good education, providing Virginia will, in the future, make her aunt's home her own. Virginia's mother, having lost her own fortune through marrying against the will of her family, feels that she must not let her daughter suffer the poverty that she has been compelled to endure. She accordingly insists upon Virginia's acceptance of her wealthy relatives offer. Virginia thereupon sets sail for France, leaving Paul broken-hearted at her departure. Virginia tries to be a dutiful niece to her aunt, who is very old and sickly, although she longs to return to her humble home and Paul, whom she dearly loves. When, however, the aunt insists that she marry a rich nobleman, Virginia refuses; her aunt disowns the girl and sends her back to the island home. Virginia's ship arrives at the Indies during a hurricane, and although a cable's length from shore, it sinks before help can reach it, and Virginia is drowned. Paul witnesses her death from the shore, and almost loses his own life in a vain attempt to save her."

== Cast ==
- Violet Heming as Virginia
- Frank H. Crane as Paul

== Production ==
The writer of the scenario is unknown, but it was most likely Lloyd Lonergan. He was an experienced newspaperman employed by The New York Evening World while writing scripts for the Thanhouser productions. The scenario was adapted from Jacques-Henri Bernardin de Saint-Pierre's novel Paul et Virginie and the title is directly derived from the title. It was translated into English in 1795 and it became very popular, but some editions rewrote the tragic ending into a happy one. The film director is unknown, but it may have been Barry O'Neil or Lucius J. Henderson. Cameramen employed by the company during this era included Blair Smith, Carl Louis Gregory, and Alfred H. Moses, Jr. though none are specifically credited as the role of the cameraman was uncredited in 1910 productions. The role of the cameraman was uncredited in 1910 productions. The only known cast credits are for the title roles. The other credits are unknown, but many 1910 Thanhouser productions are fragmentary. In late 1910, the Thanhouser company released a list of the important personalities in their films. The list includes G.W. Abbe, Justus D. Barnes, Frank H. Crane, Irene Crane, Marie Eline, Violet Heming, Martin J. Faust, Thomas Fortune, George Middleton, Grace Moore, John W. Noble, Anna Rosemond, Mrs. George Walters.

The New York Dramatic Mirror review contained specific details about the costumes and the production of the film, allowing for a view into the lost film. Apparently, Frank H. Crane wore white tights that were bagged at the knees and elbows. Violet Heming wore white gauzy robes, likened to those of fictional fairy princess'. The French gentleman sported a "Prince Albert", referring to the double-breasted Frock coat, and a silk hat. This contrast in gown was unusual, and the other characters wore colonial clothing. The scene containing the tempest which shipwrecks Virginia was described as being ineffective, but reviews in the Mirror were known to be strongly slanted towards Edison Trust companies. This included acting as a spoiler for Ten Nights in a Bar Room to bolster another Licensed company.

== Release and reception ==
The single reel drama, approximately 1,000 feet long, was released on November 15, 1910. (Note: Some advertisements erroneously stated that the film would be released on November 14.) Thanhouser advertised the film with Pierre Auguste Cot's The Storm which is believed to have been inspired by Paul et Virginie. The film had a wide national release, with theaters advertising the film in Indiana, Pennsylvania, Kansas, Maryland, and Wisconsin.

Reviews were mixed in trade publications, with Paul's garb being cited as the weakest aspect by two different reviewers. Walton of The Moving Picture News, praised the film as a success, but did not provide any details as to why it was successful. The Moving Picture World provided a detailed review which praised the adaptation of the novel and found the staging and the acting to be clear and strong. The New York Dramatic Mirror review was negative, criticizing the garb, tempest scene, and describing the acting as lacking in feeling. The Nickelodeon, an uncommon source for Thanhouser reviews, was not fooled by Crane's outfit. The reviewer said, "It is usually good advice to tell a man to 'keep his shirt on,' but we decidedly advise the actor who played the part of Paul in this piece to take his shirt off the next time he essays the role of a child of nature whose costume consists principally of his own skin plus a few trimmings. Baggy underwear, where his skin ought to be, looks like the arch-fiend. ... The production was adequate up to the point of the tempest and shipwreck, which fell down deplorably. Better to have left it out all together. From here onward the photoplay adapters have departed from the original story, and maybe they were wise. Paul in his nude underwear would have spoiled Virginia's funeral." The film is presumed lost.

== See also ==
- List of American films of 1910
