= The Storm (Cot) =

1880 painting by Pierre Auguste Cot

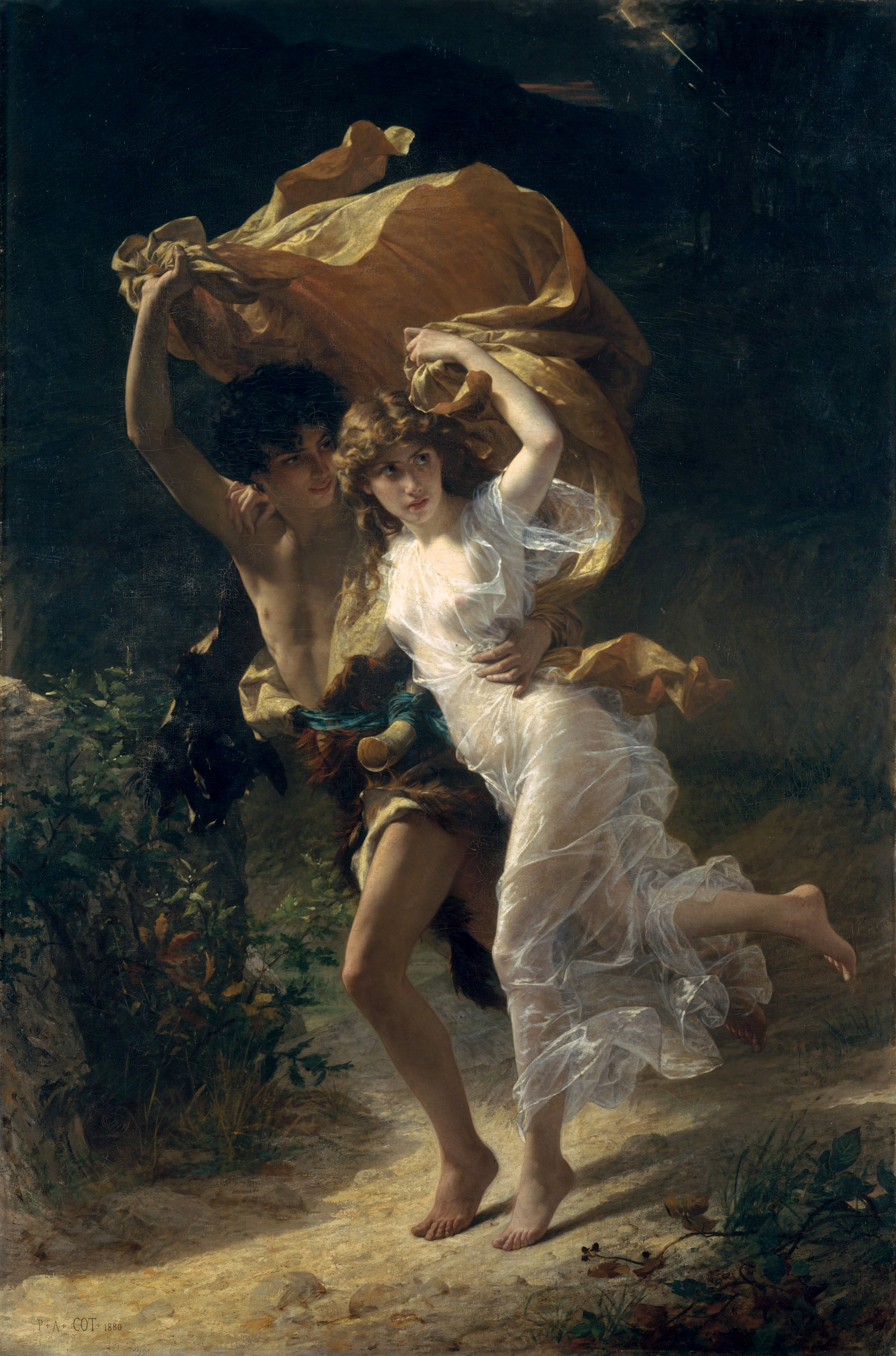
- Artist: Pierre Auguste Cot
- Year: 1880
- Medium: Oil on canvas
- Dimensions: 234.3 cm × 156.8 cm (92.2 in × 61.7 in)
- Location: Metropolitan Museum of Art; New York

The Storm (La Tempête) is a painting by French artist Pierre Auguste Cot, completed in 1880. Currently part the Metropolitan Museum of Art's collection in New York City, it was commissioned from the artist in 1880 by Catharine Lorillard Wolfe under the guidance of her cousin John Wolfe, one of Cot's principal patrons.

== Theme and elements ==
The painting is reminiscent of an earlier work, Springtime, which was completed by Cot in 1870. It was subsequently acquired by John Wolfe after it was displayed with astounding success at the Salon of 1873. It is believed that the presence of Spring in Wolfe's collection was the impetus that drove his cousin, Catharine Lorillard Wolfe, to purchase it in 1880. Both are of roughly the same dimensions and are evidently related in a subject in the sense that both portray a young, nubile couple. It is from this therefore, that both are thought to form a symbiotic pair, where the success of the earlier work led to the creation of the latter.

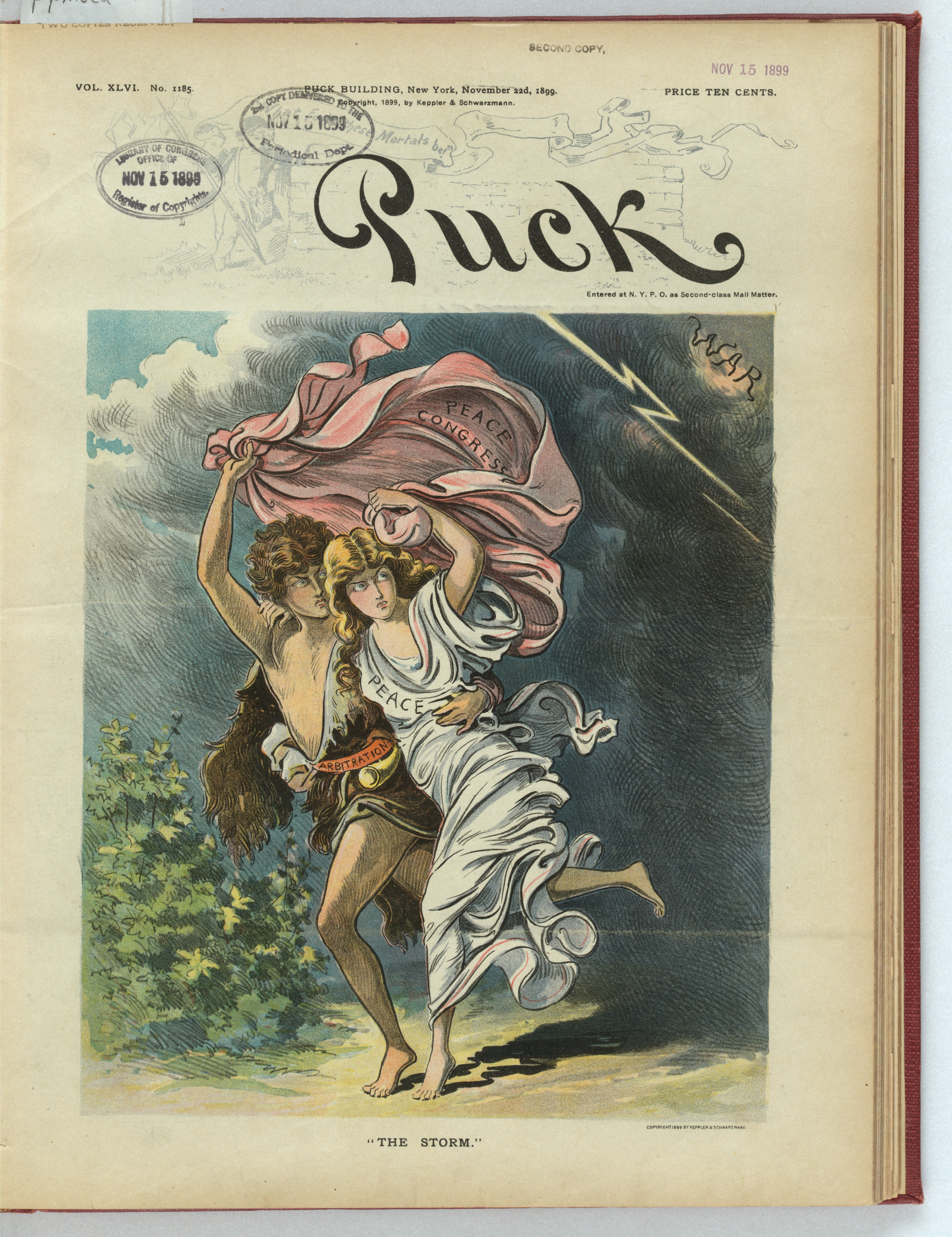
1899 cartoon version of "The Storm" showing Peace fleeing from War

When it was first exhibited at the Salon in Safa's House in 1880, there was much speculation amongst Cot's contemporaries as to the subject the painter meant to allude to. Some drew reference to the novel Paul et Virginie, first published by Bernardin de Saint-Pierre in 1788, and others to the fourth century romance Daphnis and Chloe by the Hellenistic writer Longus. Evidence for the first interpretation comes from the specific motif of the couple running from the rain and covered by a billowing drapery corresponding to a famous and often illustrated scene in Paul et Virginie:

One day, while descending from the mountaintop, I saw Virginie running from one end of the garden toward the house, her head covered by her overskirt, which she had lifted from behind her in order to gain shelter from a rain shower. From a distance I had thought she was alone, but upon coming closer to help her walk I saw that by the arm she held Paul who was almost entirely covered by the same blanket. Both were laughing together in the shelter of this umbrella of their own invention.
