= Gabrielle Cot =

1890 painting by William-Adolphe Bouguereau

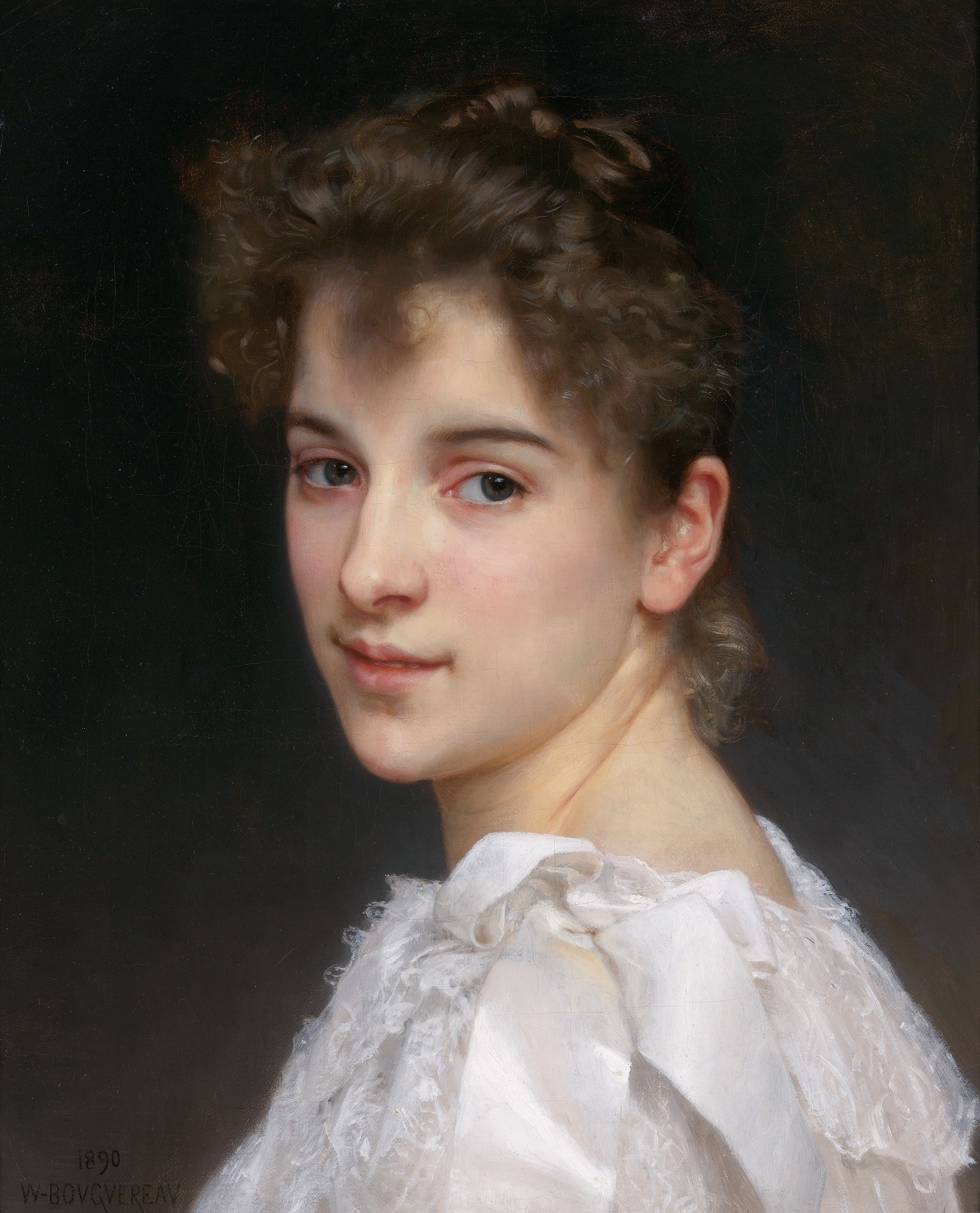
- Artist: William-Adolphe Bouguereau
- Year: 1890
- Medium: Oil on canvas
- Dimensions: 45.5 cm × 38 cm (17.9 in × 15 in)
- Location: Iuchi Collection On loan to the National Museum of Western Art; Tokyo

Gabrielle Cot (French pronunciation: [ɡabʁijɛl kɔt]) is an oil-on-canvas portrait painted in 1890 by William-Adolphe Bouguereau. Gabrielle Cot was the daughter of the French painter Pierre Auguste Cot, the most notable pupil of Bouguereau. This painting was one of the few non-commissioned portraits he ever painted.

== Background ==
Initially the work was started as a study for another painting but Bouguereau was enthralled by Gabrielle Cot's charm and beauty, so he decided to paint a portrait of her.

== Description ==
The painting measures 45.7 by 38.1 centimetres (18.0 by 15.0 in) and bears the artist's signature, W-BOUGUEREAU, and the date of 1890 in the lower left corner.

== Exhibitions and provenance ==
The painting was gifted to Madame Duret by Bouguereau on the occasion of Gabrielle's marriage. Gabrielle married to Louis Zislin in 1890. The painting was exhibited at the Cercle de L'union Artistique in Paris during 1891. It remained in Duret's family passing down via inheritance. It was sold for the first time on November 10, 1998 in New York at Sotheby's without knowing its traceability and how it arrived in the United States. Contrary to the catalog raisonné, this painting was never sold at Phillips on May 15, 1983; it was exhibited a year later in 1999 at the Newington Cropsey Foundation. It has been deposited at the National Museum of Western Art, Tokyo since September 22, 2022.
