= Catherine Dorothée de Saint-Pierre =

French woman (1743–1807)

- Born: Catherine Dorothée de Saint-Pierre; 23 June 1743
- Died: 18 October 1807 (aged 64); Dieppe, Seine-Maritime, France
- Relatives: Jacques-Henri Bernardin de Saint-Pierre (brother)
- Writing career
- Period: 18th century
- Genre: Correspondence

Catherine Dorothée de Saint-Pierre, born on 23 June 1743, was the younger sister of French writer and botanist Jacques-Henri Bernardin de Saint-Pierre. Saint-Pierre lived in Normandy and corresponded frequently with her brother. She died on 18 October 1807 in Dieppe.

== Biography ==
Saint-Pierre was born on 23 June 1743 to Nicholas Saint-Pierre and Catherine Godebout. She was the younger sister of Jacques-Henri Bernardin de Saint-Pierre, whom she corresponded frequently with between 1766 and 1804. Her letters to her brother, over 100 in total, discuss a variety of matters, such as subjects relating to family affairs as well as political affairs relating to the French Revolution.

Saint-Pierre never married. Her mother died during her childhood, after which her father remarried. He died in 1765, when Saint-Pierre was twenty-three years old. Her father's sudden death imperiled her financial standing, and she briefly joined an Ursuline convent in Honfleur. Afterwards, she moved to l’hôtel Dieu in Dieppe, where she spent the majority of her life. She received financial support from her brothers, primarily Bernardin de Saint-Pierre, who requested a royal pension for her to grant her some degree of financial autonomy.

In 1788, she moved to live with the family of Joseph-Thomas Fouray, father-in-law of Saint-Pierre's cousin Pierre Godebout. After living there for a while, she moved back to l’hôtel Dieu where she died on 18 October 1807.
