= Pharamond Blanchard =

French painter

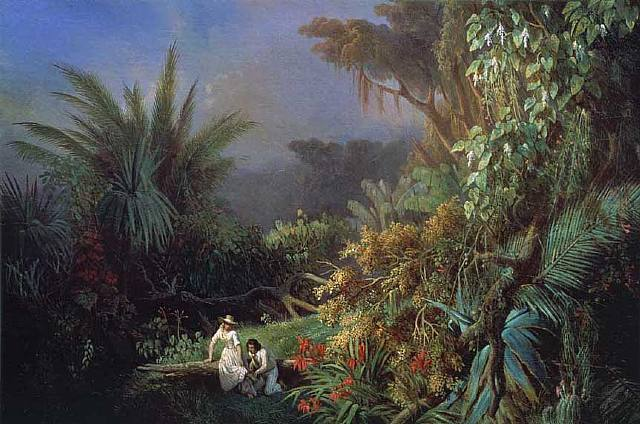
Paul et Virginie (1844)

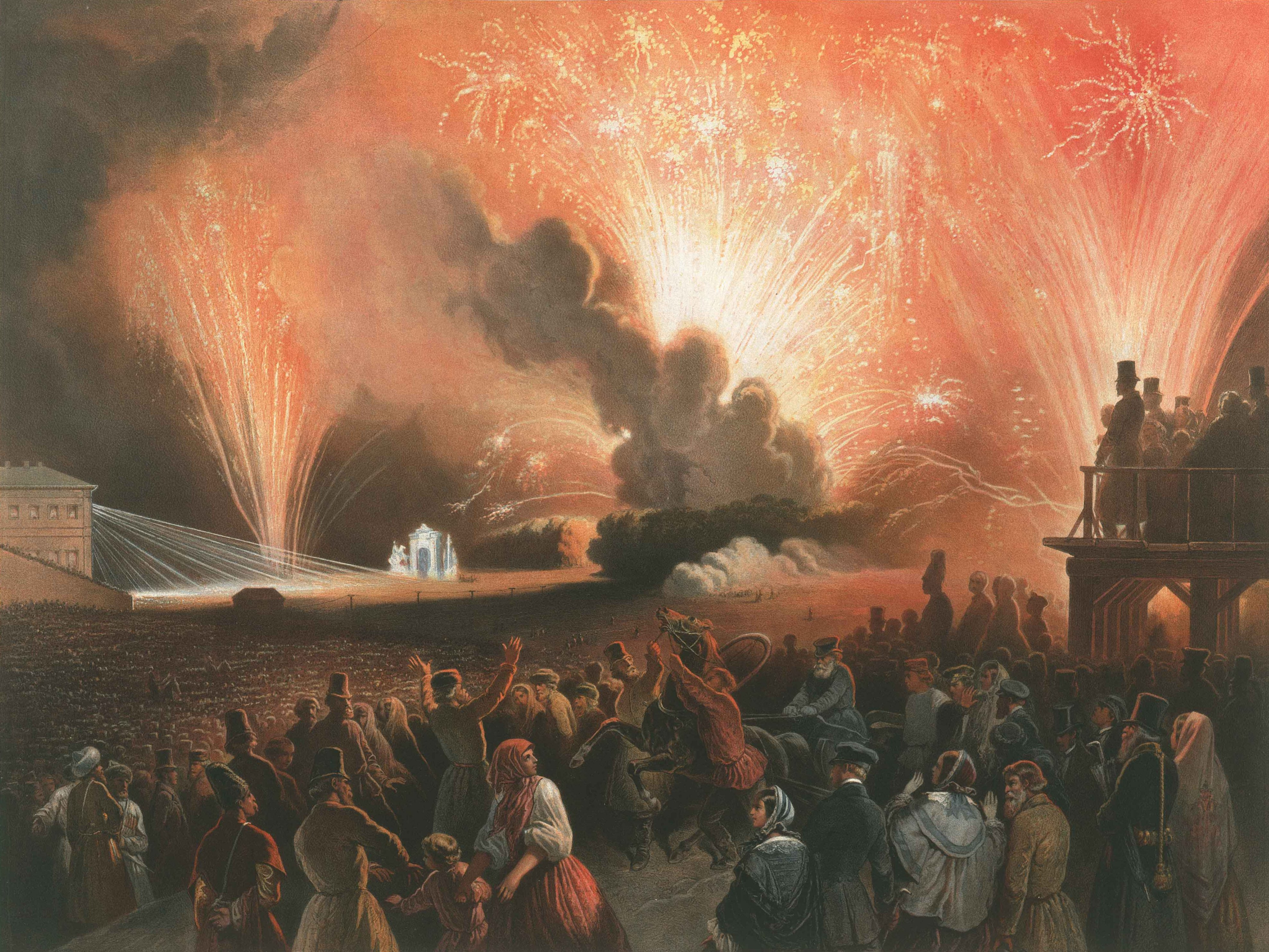
Fireworks, a chromolithograph from the 1856 Alexander II Coronation Book.

Henri Pierre Léon Pharamond Blanchard (1805–1873) was a French lithographer, and painter of landscapes and historical subjects.

== Life ==
Blanchard was born at La Guillotière, a suburb of Lyon, in 1805. He studied under Antoine-Jean Gros, travelled in many distant countries, and went to Mexico with the French expedition of 1858–9. In 1856 he was in Russia, and was present at the coronation of Alexander II. Much of his career was devoted to lithography, and he contributed extensively to L'Illustration. In 1855 he published L'Itinéraire Historique et Descriptif de Paris à Constantinople (12 plates).

He died in Paris in 1873.

== Works ==
His principal works include:.

- Bull-Hunting.
- Puente Colgado of Aranjuez. 1834.
- The Smugglers. 1836.
- The Disarmament of Vera Cruz. 1840. (At Versailles.)
- The Street of El Alari at Tangiers.
- San Isidoro Labrador, the Patron Saint of Madrid.
- Vasco Nuñez de Balboa discovering the South Sea. (Paris Univ. Exhib. 1855.)
- The Valley of Jehoshaphat. (Paris Univ. Exhib. 1855.)
- The Arrival of the French at Plan-del-Rio. 1865.
- Farm Yard at Chatou.
- The Djiguietofka.
- An American Glade.
