= Puente Colgado (Aranjuez) =

Coordinates: 40.0367°N 3.6050°W

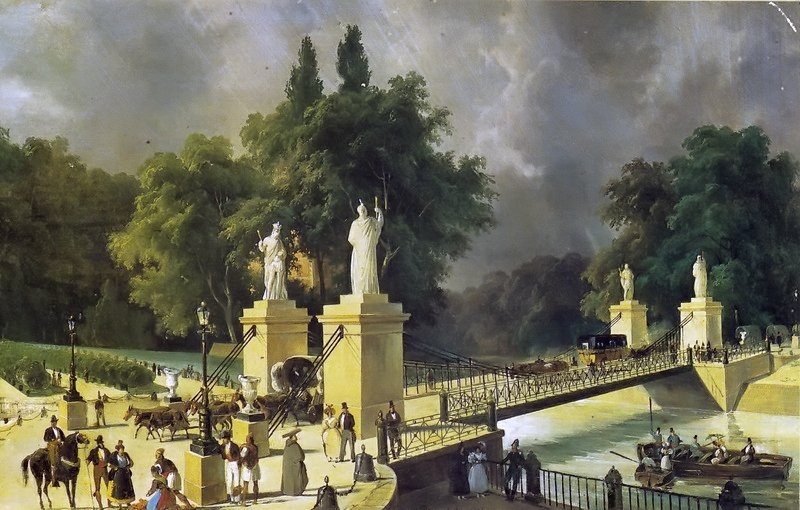
Puente Colgado of Aranjuez in 1834 by Pharamond Blanchard

The Puente Colgado (Hanged Bridge) or Puente Colgante (Hanging Bridge) was a bridge on the Tagus river located in the town of Aranjuez, in the Community of Madrid, Spain.

This replaced the Puente de Barcas, an ancient bridge that never became the main access to Aranjuez.

It was built in the 1820s by Pedro Miranda. It had Classical style statues It could be considered a door to the city of a dignity that did not demean to its surroundings, as well as an attractive element.

It was replaced due to the urgencies of the heavy traffic of an entire national highway running more practical solutions than beautiful.

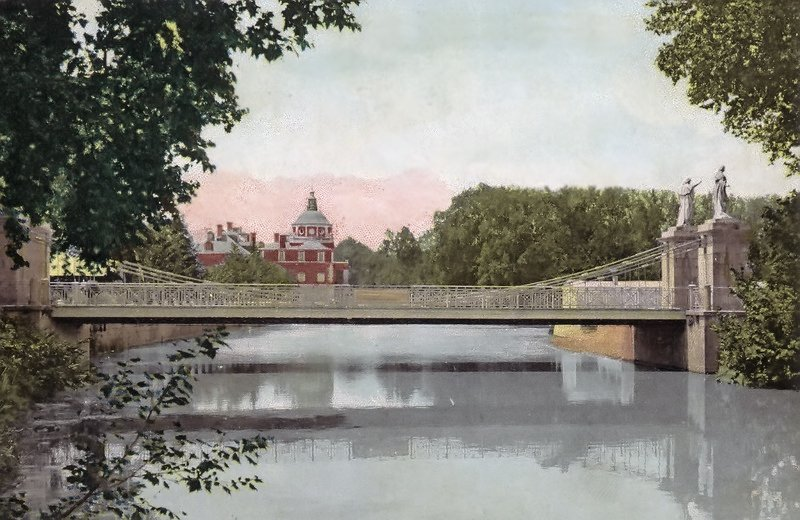
Puente Colgante of Aranjuez in 1830 by Fernando Bambrila

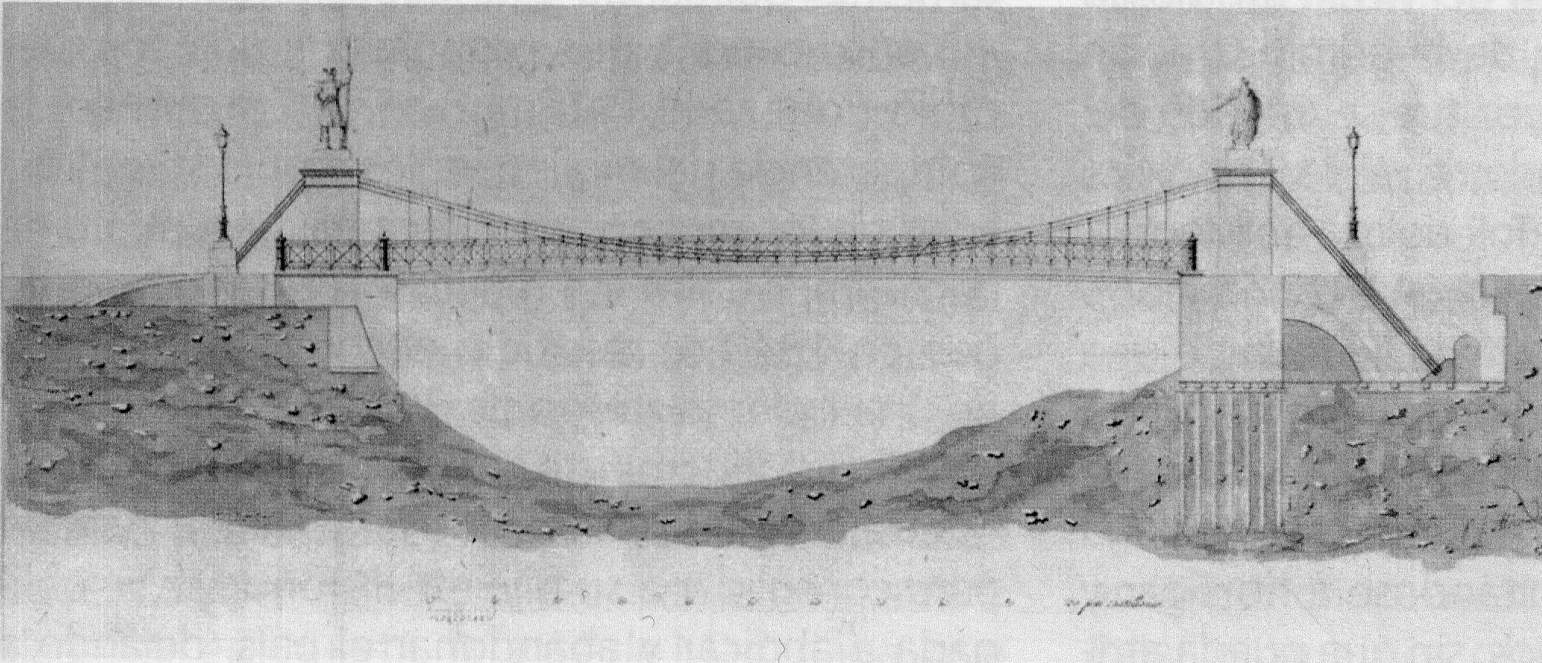
Section of the Puente Colgado
