= Pierre Auguste Cot =

French painter (1837–1883)

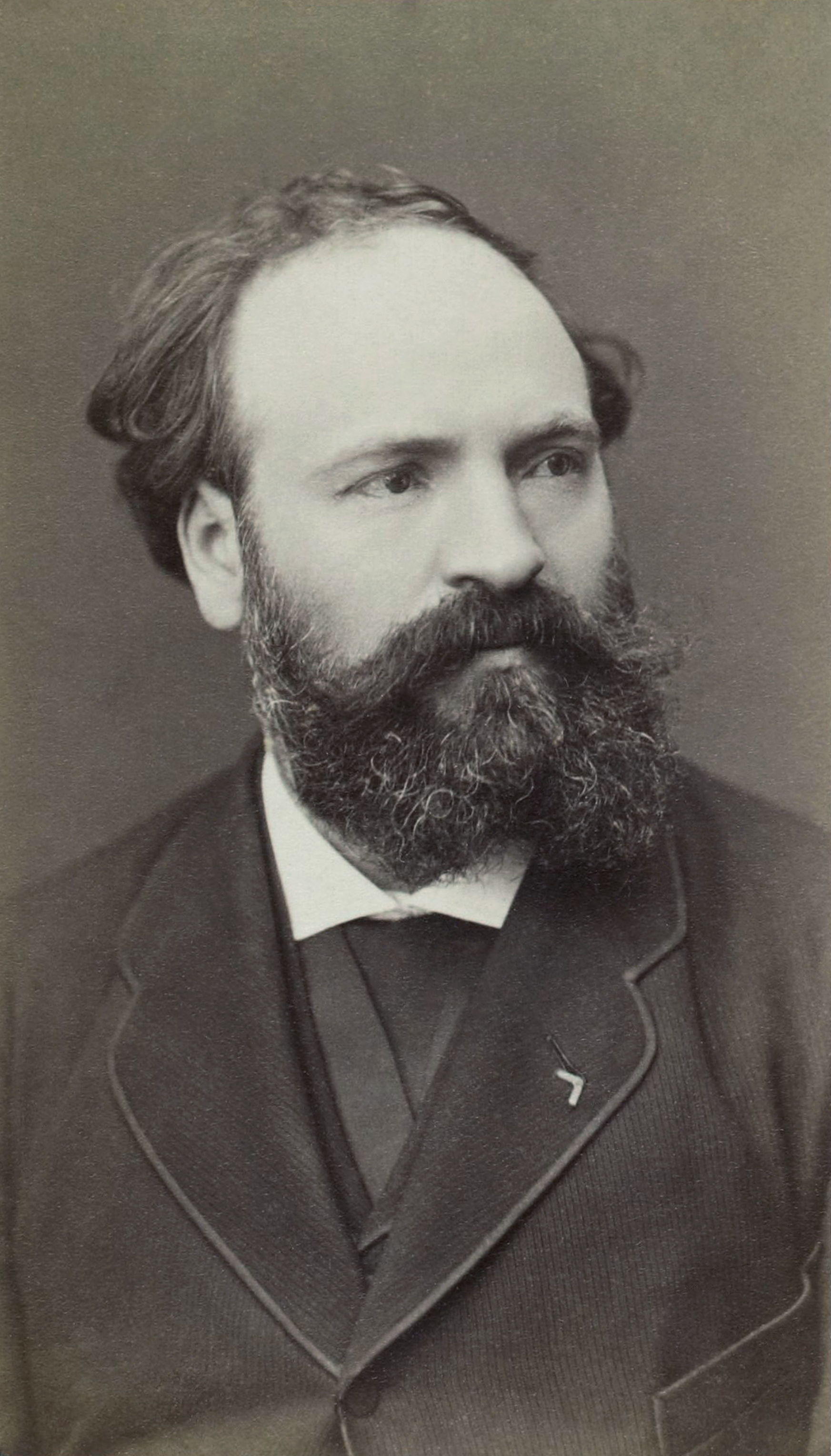
- Born: Pierre Auguste Cot; 17 February 1837; Bédarieux, Hérault, France
- Died: 2 August 1883 (aged 46); Paris, France
- Resting place: Père Lachaise Cemetery
- Known for: Painting
- Notable work: Springtime (1873); The Storm (1880)
- Movement: Academic Classicism
- Awards: Chevalier of the Legion of Honour

Pierre Auguste Cot (French: [pjɛʁ o.ɡyst kɔt]; 17 February 1837 – 2 August 1883) was a French painter of the Academic Classicism school.

== Life and career ==
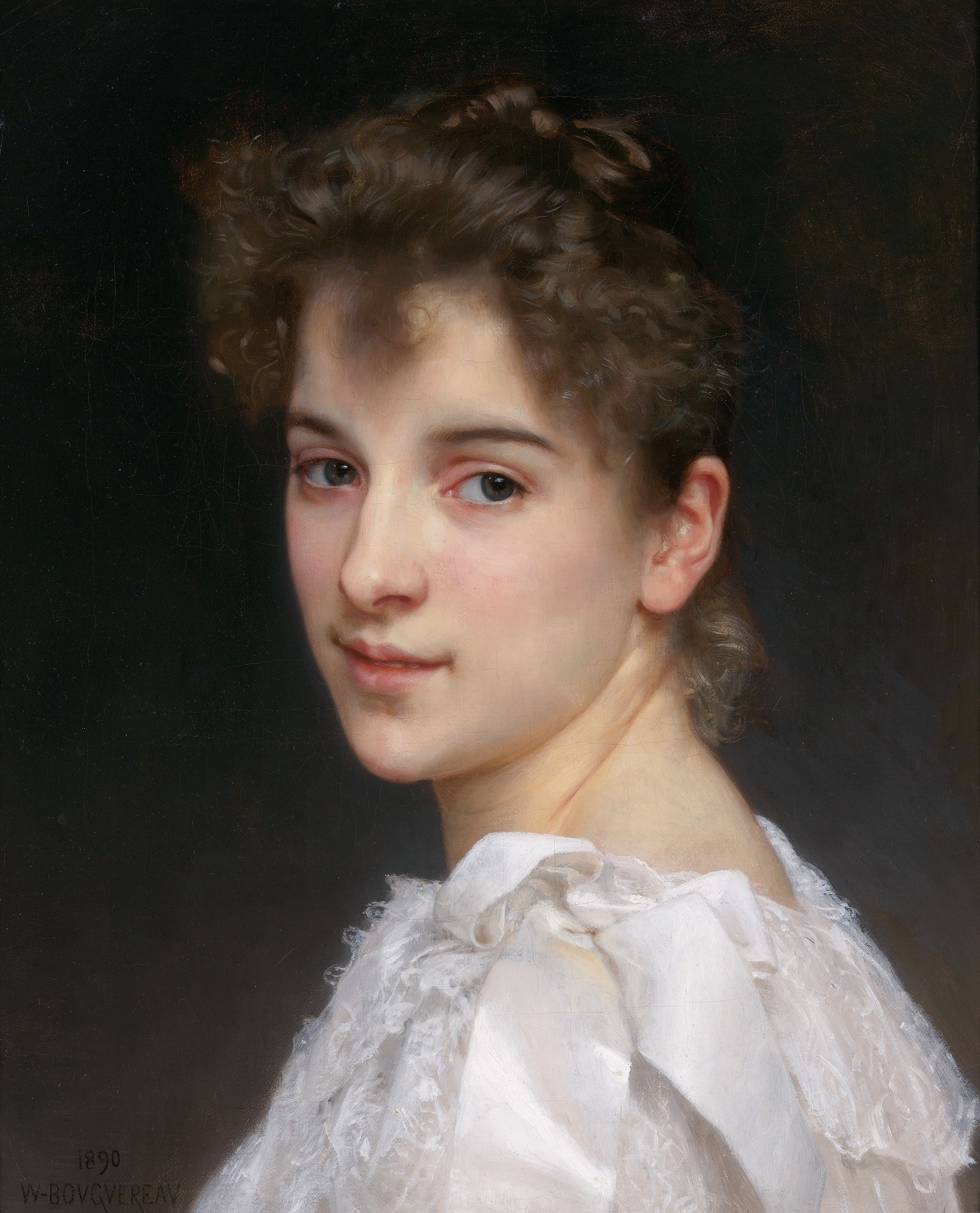
Bouguereau's Gabrielle Cot, a portrait of Cot's daughter

Cot was born in Bédarieux, Hérault, and initially studied at l'Ecole des Beaux-Arts in Toulouse before going to Paris. He studied under Leon Cogniet, Alexandre Cabanel and William-Adolphe Bouguereau. In 1863 he made a successful debut at the Salon, and from the 1870s, his popularity grew quickly.

Cot enjoyed the patronage of the academic sculptor Francisque Duret, whose daughter he married, and of Bouguereau, with whom he had also worked. Bouguereau painted a portrait of Cot's daughter, Gabrielle. Bouguereau had dined with the Cot family to celebrate Gabrielle's marriage to an architect named Zilin. The artist made a gift of the painting to the wife of Duret, Gabrielle's grandmother.

Cot won various prizes and medals, and in 1874 was made Chevalier of the Legion of Honour.

He died in Paris at the age of 46. He is buried at the Père Lachaise Cemetery.

== Works ==
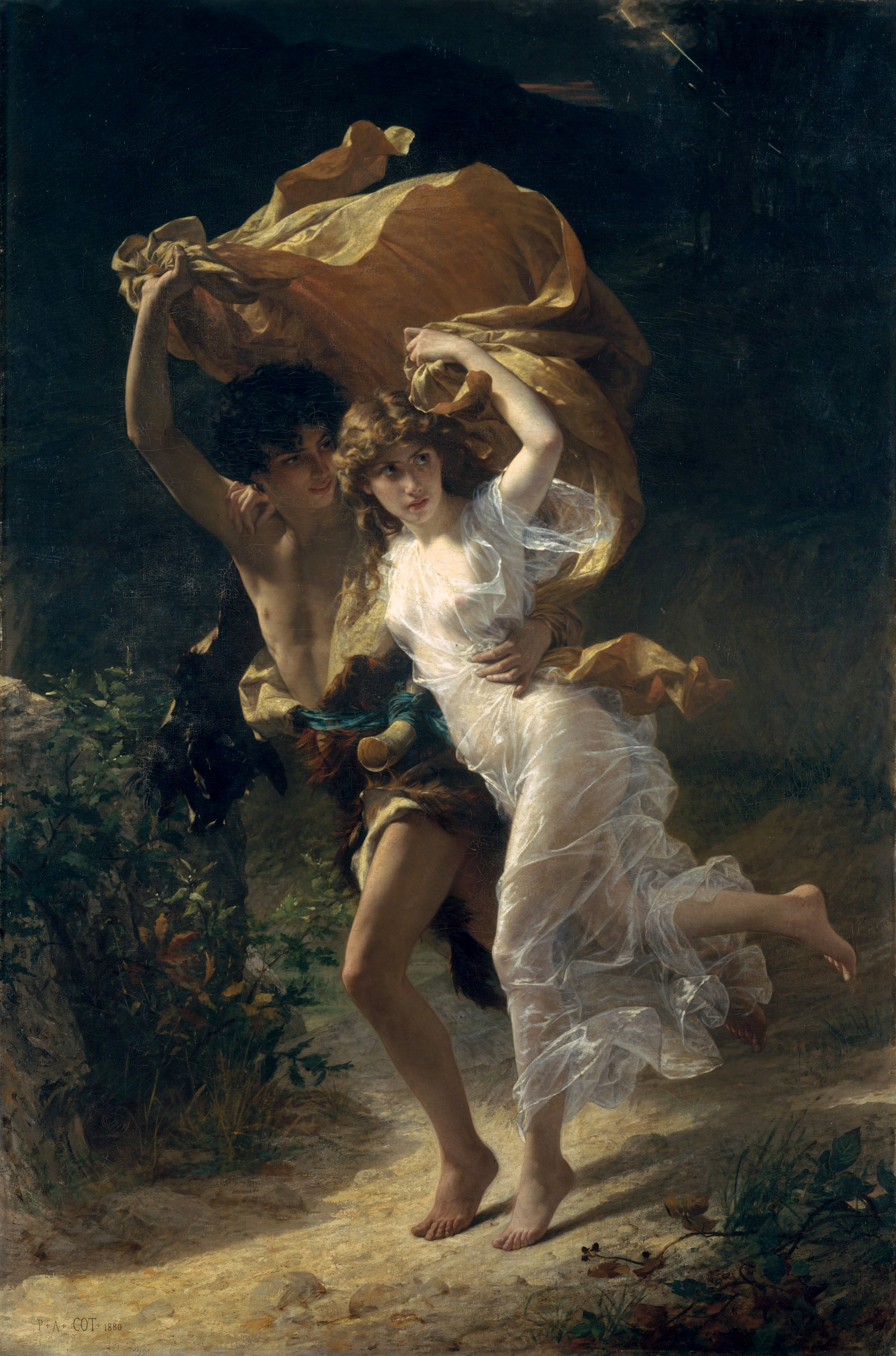
The Storm (1880)

He created several works of lasting popularity, including Springtime, featuring two young lovers sitting upon a swing, and The Storm. Both these paintings are on display at the Metropolitan Museum of Art in New York City; The Storm belongs to the museum while Le Printemps is owned privately.

Cot also was renowned for his portraits, which made up the majority of his work. The more enduring figurative work, such as The Storm, is comparatively rare. Shortly after his death at the age of forty-six (2 August 1883), a subscription was undertaken for a commemorative monument to the artist, which was erected at Bédarieux in 1892.

=== Selected works ===
- Dionysia (1870), Chi-Mei Museum, Taiwan
- Ophelia (1870)
- The Gypsy or La Bohémienne (1871)
- Springtime or Le Printemps (1873), Metropolitan Museum of Art, New York City
- The Storm or L'Orage (1880), Metropolitan Museum of Art
- The Reading Light or La Liseuse (about 1880)
- Portrait of Madame Mas (1882)
- Mireille (1882), Musée Fabre, Montpellier
- Charity for My Sister, Wolverhampton Art Gallery

== Students ==
- Ellen Day Hale (1855–1940)
- Anna Elizabeth Klumpke (1856–1942)
- Louise Ward, pseudonym Louise Dubréau (1849–1930)

== Gallery ==
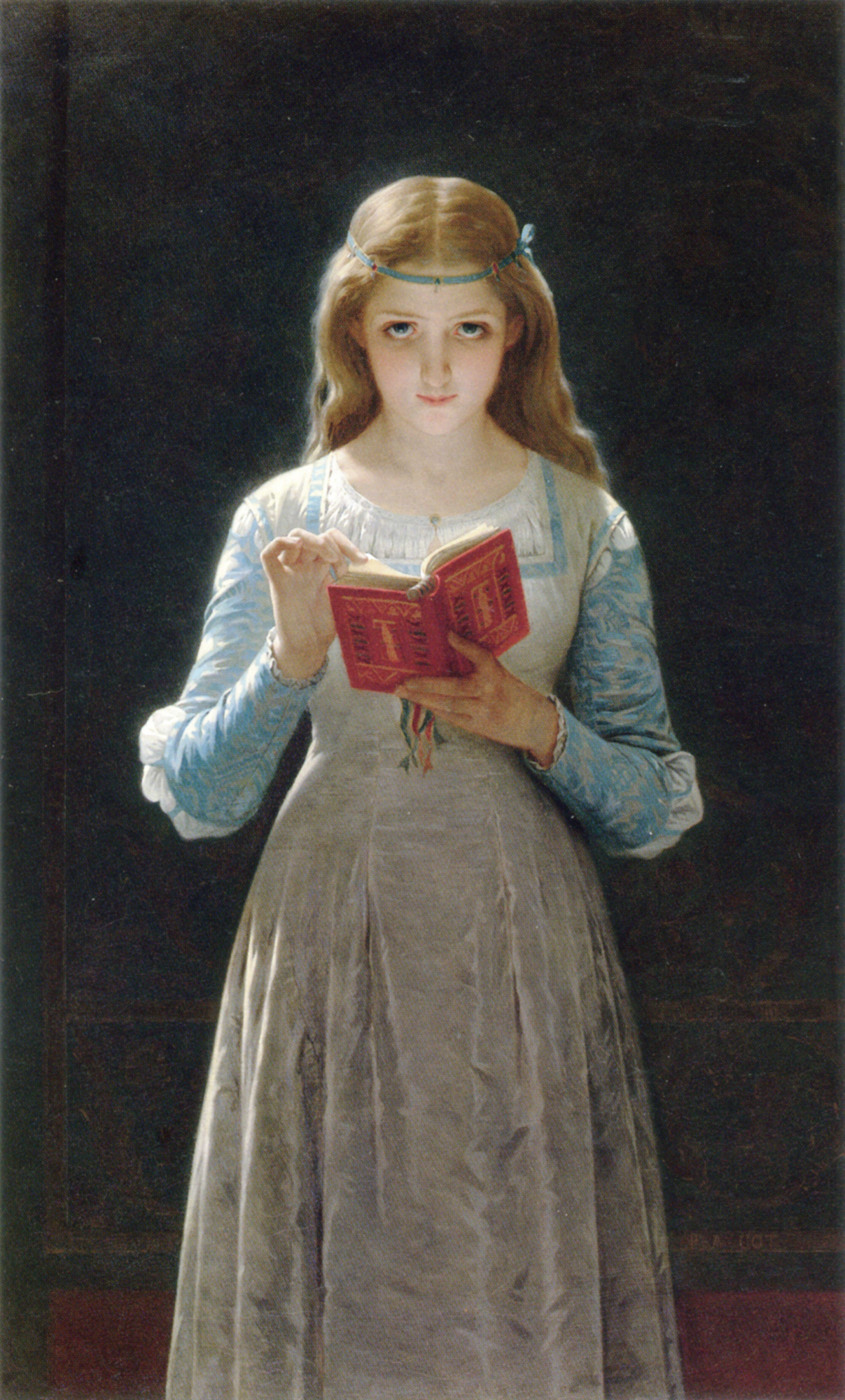
Ophelia, 1870

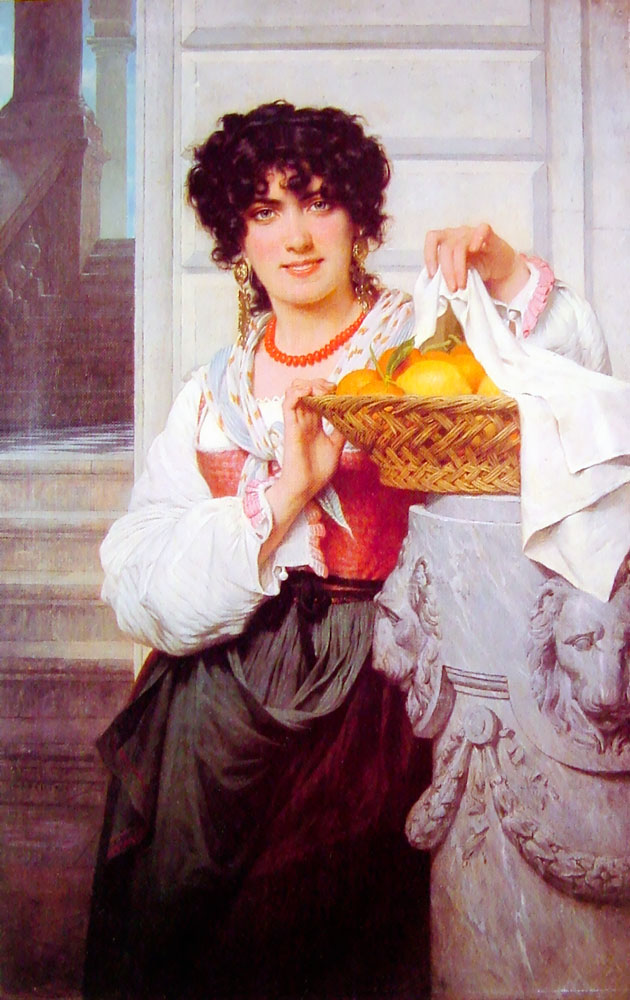
Girl with Basket of Oranges and Lemons, 1871

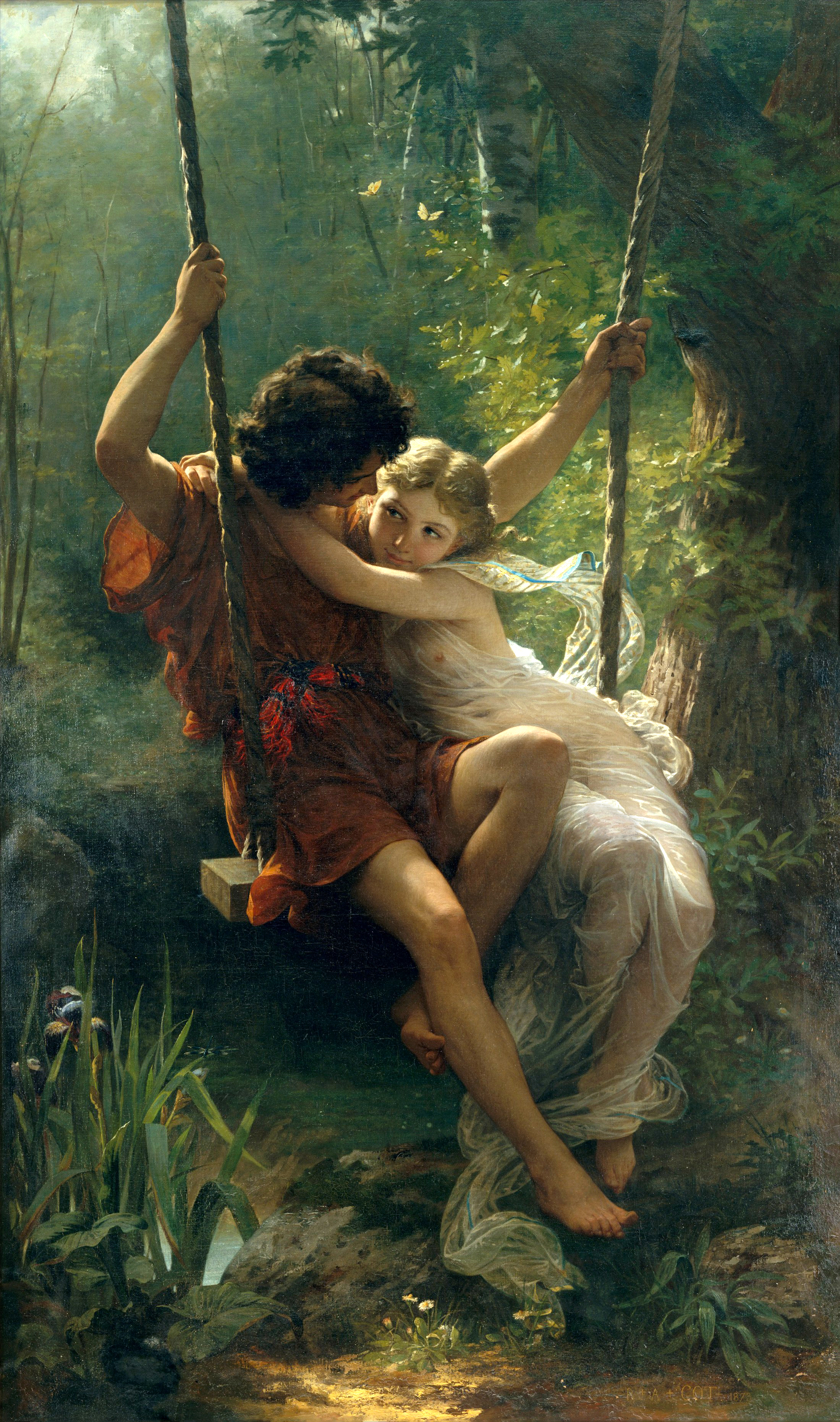
Springtime, 1873

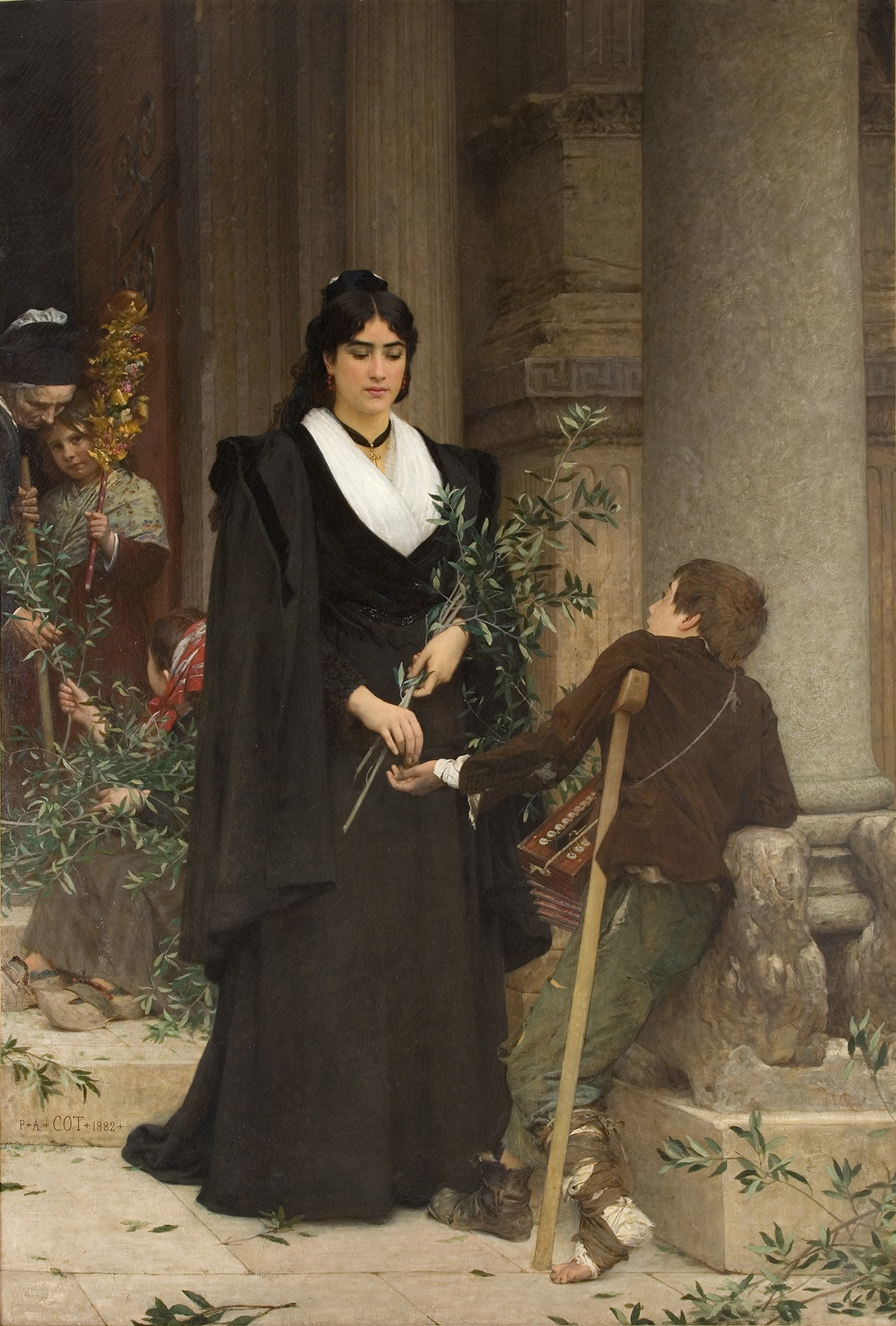
Mireille Giving Alms at Saint-Trophime, 1882

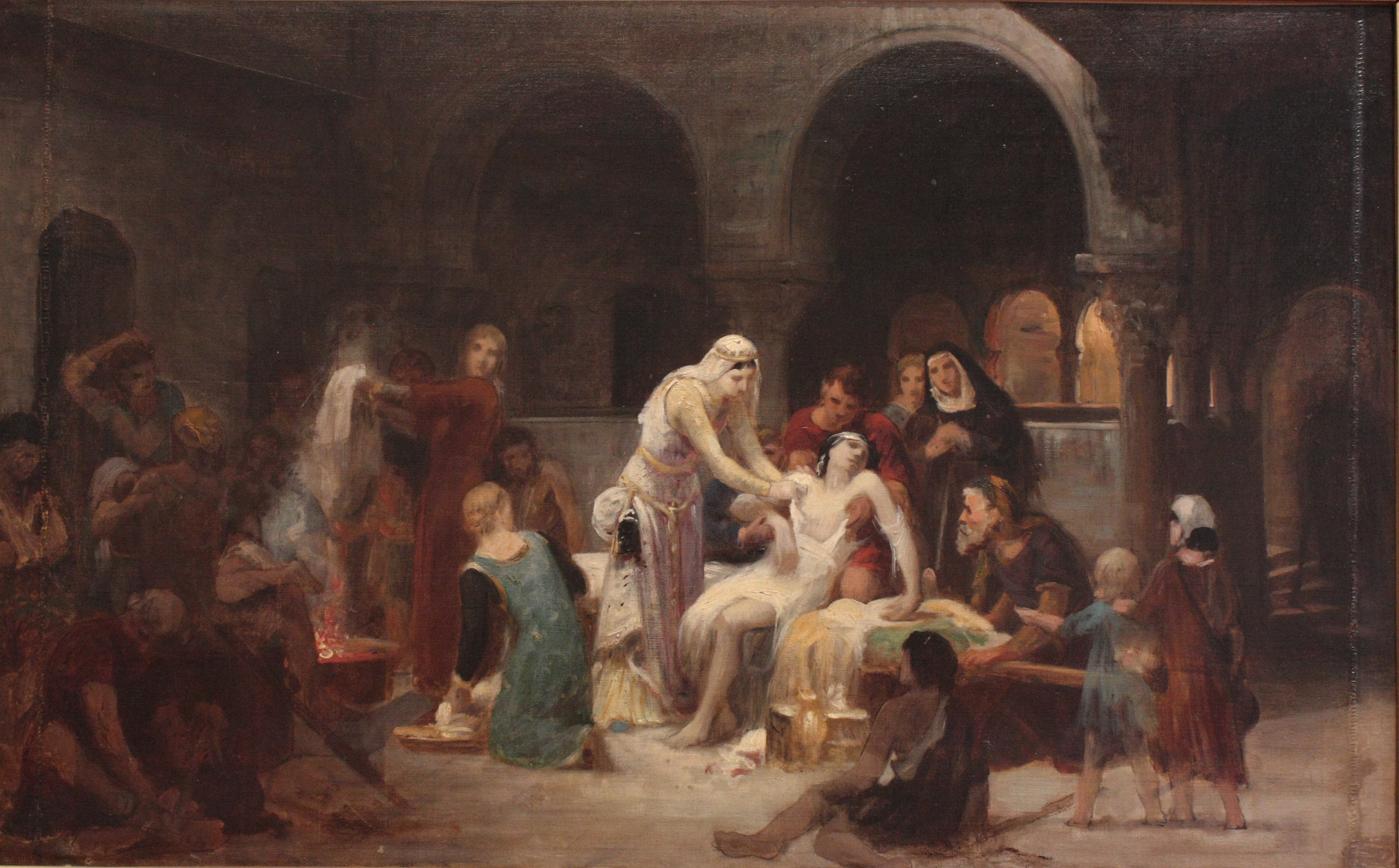
Saint Elizabeth of Hungary Curing the Sick, 1883
