= Paul et Virginie =

1788 novel by Jacques-Henri Bernardin de Saint-Pierre

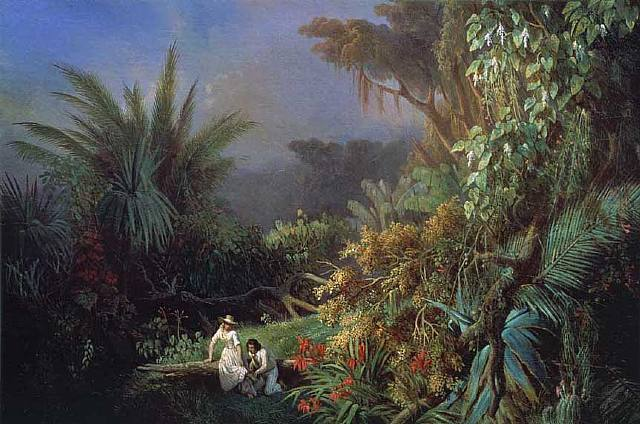
Paul et Virginie, 1844, by Henri Pierre Léon Pharamond Blanchard

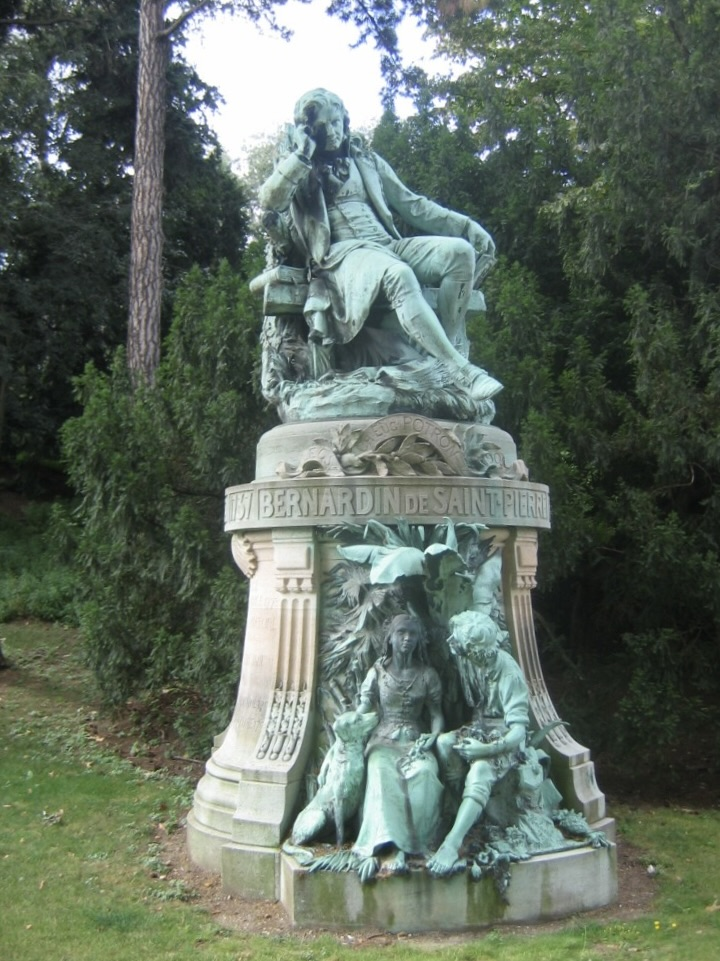
Bernardin de Saint-Pierre memorial in the Jardin des Plantes, Paris; Paul and Virginie in the pedestal.

Paul et Virginie (French pronunciation: [pɔl e viʁʒini]; sometimes known in English as Paul and Virginia) is a novel by Jacques-Henri Bernardin de Saint-Pierre, first published in 1788. The novel's title characters are friends since birth who fall in love. The story is set on the island of Mauritius under French rule, then named Île de France. Written on the eve of the French Revolution, the novel is recognized as perhaps Bernardin's finest work. It records the fate of a child of nature corrupted by the artificial sentimentality of the French upper classes in the late eighteenth century. Bernardin de Saint-Pierre lived on the island for a time and based part of the novel on a shipwreck he had witnessed there.

== Synopsis ==
The story begins with being narrated by a young man who is in Isle de France (present-day Mauritius) at Port-Louis. He enjoys going to a place where two small huts can be seen. One day, he meets an old man and asks him who lived in these huts. The old man's narration then begins. He was a friend of two families who lived peacefully in these huts. These families have died, but they were models of virtue. The interested young man questions the old man, who then tells him the story of Paul and Virginie.

Paul and Virginie are raised as brother and sister by two single mothers amidst the natural splendour of tropical landscapes on an island and in isolation from the rest of the world. They lead an idyllic life immersed in virtue, simplicity, and altruism, living off the work of their hands and what nature provides them.

An important moment in the lives of Paul and Virginie is their encounter with a beaten slave. Indeed, one day, while Marguerite and Madame de la Tour are at mass, Virginie and Paul, who are about ten or twelve years old, see a slave running towards them. She explains that she has escaped from her master, who was beating her. Virginie then takes it upon herself to escort the slave back to her master and to ask the master for forgiveness for his slave. Paul and Virginie therefore escort the slave, who is granted mercy. They leave quickly because this master does not make a good impression on Virginie. They get lost trying to return home. They are found by Domingue with the help of Fidèle, the dog. Domingue explains that on the way, he saw the slave that the two children had tried to save, on a pole with a collar and spikes. This passage is a very important moment in the story because it marks the young children, who later speak about it as teenagers.

When adolescence begins to emerge, Virginie feels a romantic sentiment awakening within her that she cannot yet name. The two mothers agree to marry their children, who have always gotten along so well, but they consider it still too early to do so. In the meantime, Madame de la Tour's aunt, Virginie's mother, suggests sending her daughter to France, where she can benefit from her substantial inheritance. However, Madame de la Tour had deliberately cut herself off from her family because she had been rejected by them due to her relationship with Virginie's father (who had died long ago). The latter was, in fact, of a lower social standing than Madame de la Tour. When Monsieur and Madame de la Tour arrived in Île de France, Monsieur de la Tour immediately set sail for Madagascar, where he died, leaving his wife at the port of Saint-Louis. To recall the meeting between Marguerite and Madame de la Tour and their past circumstances, when Madame de la Tour and Marguerite meet, Marguerite is already settled on the island with Domingue. Marguerite was born into a peasant family in Brittany. She falls in love with a gentleman who promises to marry her, but he does not keep his promise. Marguerite decides to leave for the colonies to hide her shame. She nursed Paul when Madame de la Tour, who is pregnant, arrives. Madame de la Tour, for her part, is accompanied by a slave named Marie.

After much hesitation, and considering the usefulness of separating Paul and Virginie for a certain time before their final union, Madame de la Tour is persuaded by her aunt, the governor, and the bishop of the island to convince Virginie to undertake the journey. She submits out of pure obedience, with a heavy heart.

During Virginie's absence, which will last a little over two years, Paul feels oppressed by boredom and worry about Virginie's feelings towards him. He learns to read and write in order to correspond with his beloved. Virginie also writes several letters, which her great-aunt does not send. Through a clever ruse, Virginie manages to send a letter after a year of absence.

When Virginie, after an unfortunate experience, finally returns, the ship bringing her back from France is caught in a storm and runs aground on the rocks before Paul, who vainly tries to save her from the waves. Virginie decides, out of modesty according to the author, not to undress even though it would make swimming and escaping easier. As for Paul, he does not take long to succumb to the pain of losing his beloved. Marguerite dies afterwards. Madame de la Tour also eventually dies.

== Book critics ==
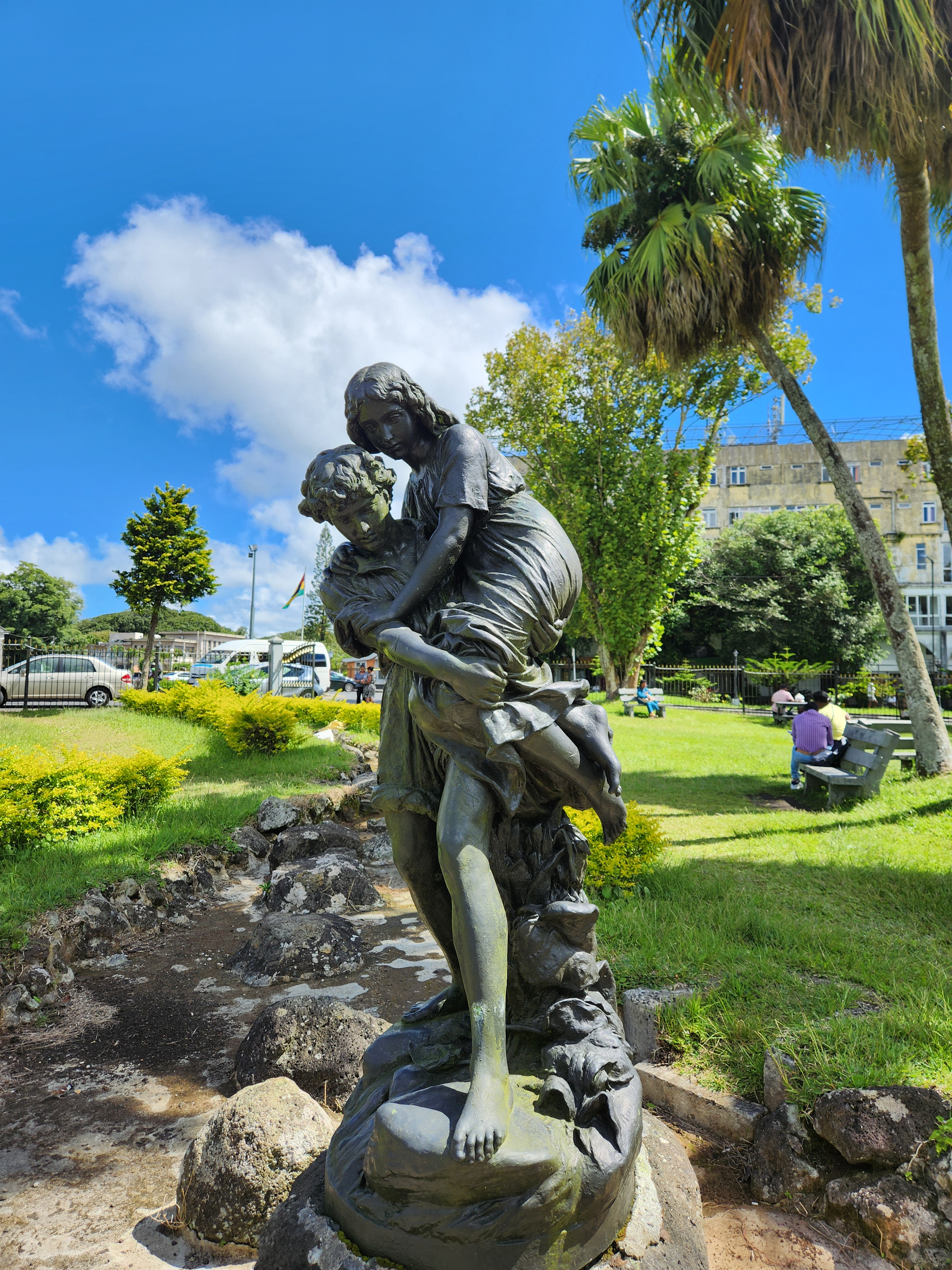
A statue depicting Paul and Virginie in Curepipe, Mauritius.

Bernardin de Saint-Pierre's novel criticizes the social class divisions found in 18th-century French society. He describes the perfect equality of social relations on Mauritius, whose inhabitants share their possessions, have equal amounts of land, and all work to cultivate it. They live in harmony, without violence or unrest. The author's beliefs echo those of Enlightenment philosophers such as Jean-Jacques Rousseau. He argues for the emancipation of slaves. He was a friend of Mahé de La Bourdonnais, the governor of Mauritius, who appears in the novel providing training and encouragement for the island's natives. Although Paul and Virginie own slaves, they appreciate their labour and do not treat them badly. When other slaves in the novel are mistreated, the book's white saviors confront the cruel masters.

The novel presents an Enlightenment view of religion: that God, or "Providence", has designed a world that is harmonious and pleasing. The characters of Paul et Virginie live off the land without needing technology or man-made interference. For instance, they tell time by observing the shadows of the trees. One critic noted that Bernardin de Saint-Pierre "admired the forethought which ensured that dark-coloured fleas should be conspicuous on white skin", believing "that the earth was designed for man's terrestrial happiness and convenience".

Thomas Carlyle, in The French Revolution: A History, wrote: "[It is a novel in which] there rises melodiously, as it were, the wail of a moribund world: everywhere wholesome Nature in unequal conflict with diseased, perfidious art; cannot escape from it in the lowest hut, in the remotest island of the sea." Alexander von Humboldt, too, cherished Paul et Virginie since his youth and recalled the novel on his American journey.

The novel's fame was such that when the participants at the Versailles Peace Conference in 1920 considered the status of Mauritius, The New York Times headlined its coverage:

"Sentimental Domain"
Island of Mauritius, Scene of Paul et Virginie, Seeks Return to French Control

== Literary references and adaptations ==
- The novel served as the basis for Rodolphe Kreutzer's Paul and Virginie (1791) and a hugely successful opera of the same name, composed by Jean-François Le Sueur, which premiered at the Théâtre Feydeau in Paris on 13 January 1794.
- In Le Curé de village (The country parson; 1839), Honoré de Balzac described how "the revelation of love came through a charming book from the hand of a genius" and then more clearly identified the work: "sweet fancies of love derived from Bernardin de Saint-Pierre's book".
- Gustave Flaubert in Madame Bovary (1856) described how Emma's experience of literature formed her imagination: "She had read Paul et Virginie, and she had fantasized about the little bamboo cottage, the Negro Domingo, the dog Fidèle, but even more the sweet friendship of some good little brother who would go and gather ripe fruits for you from great trees taller than spires, or who would run barefoot in the sand, bringing you a bird's nest." In Un Cœur simple (A Simple Heart; 1877), he used the names Paul and Virginie for the two children of Madame Aubain, Félicité's employer.
- In The Small House at Allington by Anthony Trollope, in a discussion on novel reading, Lily suggests Paul and Virginia.
- In Little Dorrit by Charles Dickens, Flora Finching, the former fiancée of protagonist Arthur Clennam, reminds him how after their parents had forced them apart, he had returned a copy of Paul and Virginia to her "without note or comment". The rough parallel between their failed engagement and the tragic history of Paul and Virginia is not explicated, but would have been obvious to Finching and Clennam.
- The novel inspired, and served as title for, a duet for clarinet and violin with piano accompaniment by Amilcare Ponchielli, which was published in 1857.
- Victor Massé wrote a very successful opera on the subject, again titled Paul and Virginie, in 1876.
- The English author William Hurrell Mallock titled his 1878 satirical novel The New Paul and Virginia, or Positivism on an Island (1878) after Bernadin de Saint-Pierre's work.
- Guy de Maupassant in Bel-Ami (1885) described a desolate room with minimal furnishings that include "two coloured pictures representing Paul and Virginie".
- Thomas Hardy in Jude the Obscure (1895) had the character Richard Phillotson describe the relationship between Jude Fawley and Sue Bridehead as "...Laon and Cythna. Also of Paul and Virginia a little".
- The novel The Blue Lagoon (1908) was inspired by Paul et Virginie.
- It served as the basis for an American short silent film Paul and Virginia in 1910.
- In Women in Love (1920) by D. H. Lawrence, Birkin makes reference to Paul et Virginie when taking Ursula on a punt (chapter 11).
- The architect Le Corbusier mentioned Paul et Virginie as one of the "great works of art...based on one or other of the great standards of the heart" in Toward an Architecture (1923).
- Exiled Russian author Victor Serge references Paul et Virginie in his 1948 novel, The Case of Comrade Tulayev, in which a character living in poverty under Stalin describes it as "unbelievable" (chapter 1).
- The Cuban author Alejo Carpentier's El reino de este mundo (1949; English The Kingdom of This World) recurs widely on the poetic world of the classical novel.
- Jorge Luis Borges mentions the novel in his story The South, the final chapter of Ficciones: "Something in its poor architecture recalled a steel engraving, perhaps one from an old edition of Paul et Virginie."
- Cordwainer Smith bases the arc of the two main characters in his story Alpha Ralpha Boulevard on Paul et Virginie, naming his characters Paul and Virginia and setting the story in a partial revival of 19th- and 20th-century French culture some 14,000 years in our future.
- In Indiana (1832), George Sand mentions the titular characters in chapter 30 when Ralph professes his love for Indiana.
- The novel was again adapted as an opera in 1920; Raymond Radiguet and Jean Cocteau collaborated on the libretto, and Erik Satie composed the music.
- Lewis Gilbert's 1971 film Friends was largely inspired by Paul et Virginie.
- In Jean-Luc Godard's 1965 film Pierrot le Fou, Ferdinand and Marianne call each other Paul and Virginie while living on a beach.
- In Agatha Christie's short story featuring Miss Marple called "Greenshaw's Folly", Horace speaks of a "colossal bronze representing... Paul and Virginia."

== Popular music ==
- Circa 1855 Louis-Antoine Jullien published the Paul et Virginie Valse.
- The Cincinnati band Over the Rhine has a song titled "Paul and Virginia" on their album Till We Have Faces (itself a reference to the novel by C. S. Lewis)
