= Springtime (Pierre Auguste Cot) =

1873 painting by Pierre Auguste Cot

- Spring
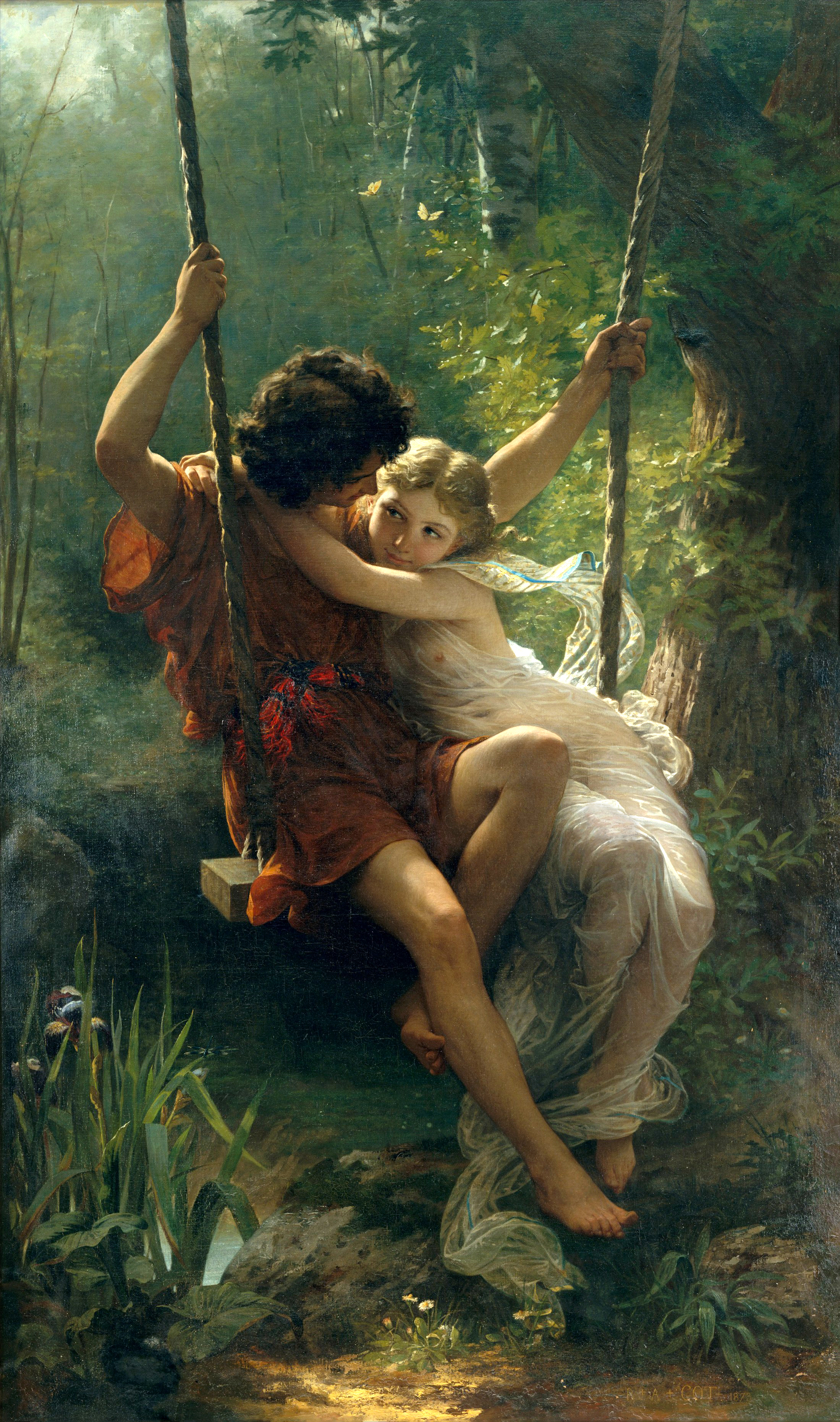
- Artist: Pierre Auguste Cot
- Year: 1873
- Medium: Oil on canvas
- Dimensions: 213.4 cm × 127 cm (84.0 in × 50 in)
- Location: Metropolitan Museum of Art, New York

Le Printemps is an oil on canvas painting by French artist Pierre Auguste Cot, from 1873. It is held in the collection of the Metropolitan Museum of Art, in New York.

== Description ==
Springtime was painted by Cot in 1873. The painting was first exhibited at the Paris Salon of 1873, where it was well-received; the work would go on to become Cot's most-successful work of art, and was often copied in other mediums. In terms of the painting itself, Cot's work depicts a young couple locked in an embrace on a swing amid a forest or garden. The two are wearing classical garb, and are seemingly enthralled by each other, described by one source as "drunken with first love".
