= Jacques-Henri Bernardin de Saint-Pierre =

French writer and botanist (1737–1814)

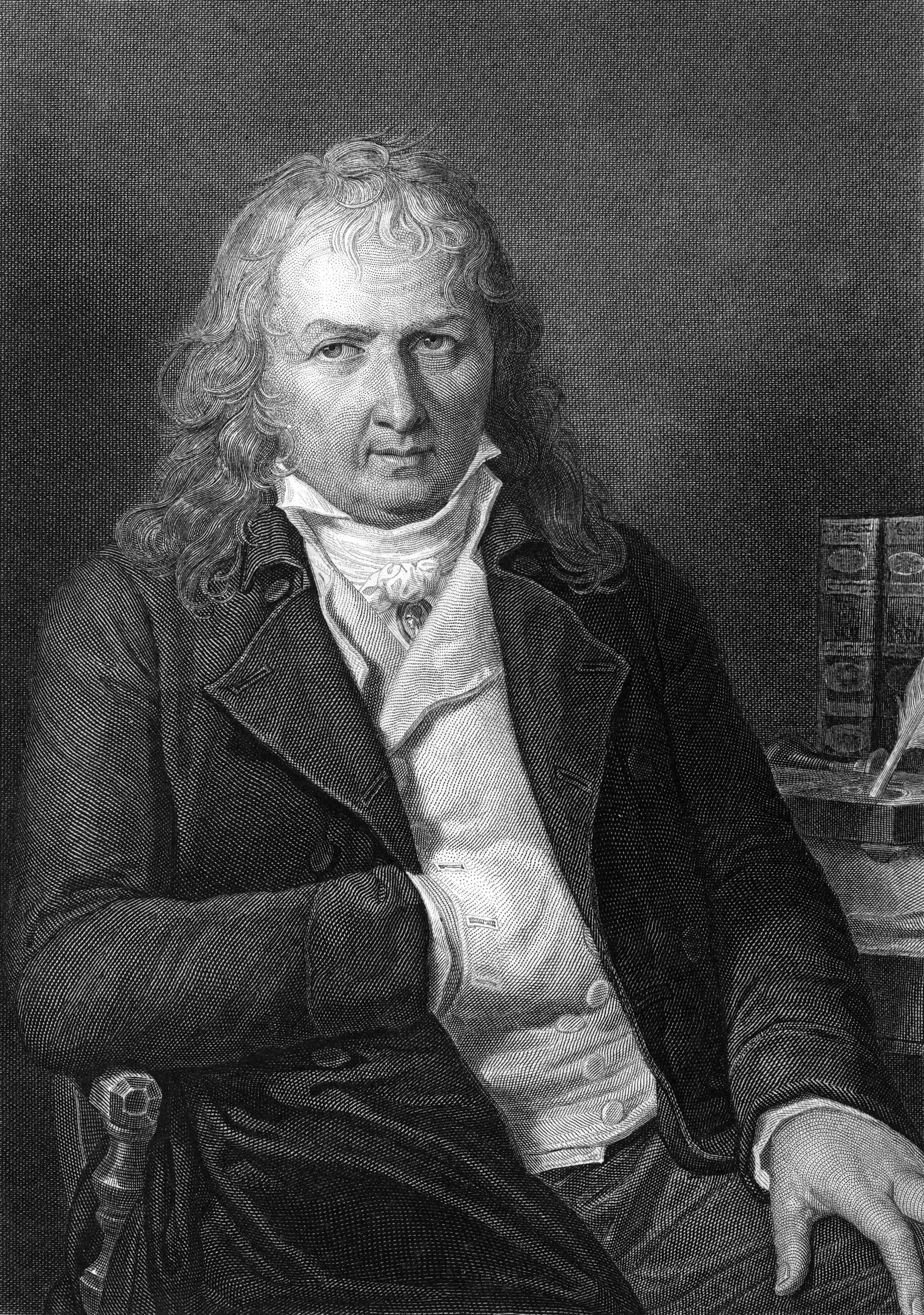
- Born: Jacques-Henri Bernardin de Saint-Pierre; 19 January 1737; Le Havre, Normandy, Kingdom of France
- Died: 21 January 1814 (aged 77); Éragny, Seine-et-Oise, France
- Occupation: Writer
- Relatives: Catherine Dorothée de Saint-Pierre (sister)
- Writing career
- Period: 18th century
- Genres: Novel, travel narrative
- Notable work: Paul et Virginie

Jacques-Henri Bernardin de Saint-Pierre (pronounced [ʒak ɑ̃ʁi bɛʁnaʁdɛ̃ də sɛ̃ pjɛʁ]; also called Bernardin de St. Pierre) (19 January 1737, in Le Havre – 21 January 1814, in Éragny, Val-d'Oise) was a French writer and botanist. He is best known for his 1788 novel, Paul et Virginie, a very popular 18th-century classic of French literature.

== Biography ==
Jacques-Henri Bernardin de Saint-Pierre's younger sister was Catherine Dorothée de Saint-Pierre. At the age of twelve he had read Robinson Crusoe and went with his uncle, a skipper, to the West-Indies. After returning from this trip he was educated as an engineer at the École des Ponts. Then he joined the French Army and was involved in the Seven Years' War against Prussia and England, but was dismissed for insubordination. After travels around Europe he returned to Paris in 1765.

He received a small inheritance on his father's death, and in 1768 he traveled to Mauritius where he served as engineer and studied plants. On his return in 1771 he became friendly with and a pupil of Jean-Jacques Rousseau. Together they studied the plants in and around Paris, and Rousseau helped form his character and style.

His Voyage à l'Île de France (2 vols., 1773) gained him a reputation as a champion of innocence and religion, and in consequence, through the exertions of the bishop of Aix, a pension of 1000 livres a year. The Études de la nature (3 vols., 1784) was an attempt to prove the existence of God from the wonders of nature; he set up a philosophy of sentiment to oppose the materializing tendencies of the Encyclopaedists. His masterpiece, Paul et Virginie, appeared in 1789 in a supplementary volume of the Études, and his second great success, less sentimental and showing some humour, the Chaumière indienne, not until 1790.

In 1795 he was elected to the Institut de France,in 1797 became manager of the Botanical Gardens (Jardin des plantes) in Paris and in 1803 was elected a member of the Académie française.

Saint-Pierre was an avid advocate and practitioner of vegetarianism, and although he was a devout Christian was also heavily influenced by Enlightenment-era intellectuals like Voltaire and his mentor Rousseau.

In 1792 he married a very young girl, Félicité Didot, who brought him a considerable dowry. After his first wife's death he married in 1800, when he was sixty-three, another young girl, Desirée Pelleport.

== Legacy ==
"Barye's predators devouring their living prey indulge the emotions in a Romantic way of course, but they also embody a romantically moralizing point of view like those held by Bernardin de Saint-Pierre, Mme de Staël, and Victor Hugo. The Oeuvres complètes of Bernardin de Saint-Pierre appeared in Paris in 1834 and was surely known to Barye, for the author was the former director of the zoo in the Jardin des Plantes and one of the "masters of genuine poetry" for the arch-romantic Mme de Staël. Bernardin de Saint-Pierre maintained that a carnivorous animal in devouring its prey alive committed a sin against the laws of its own nature."

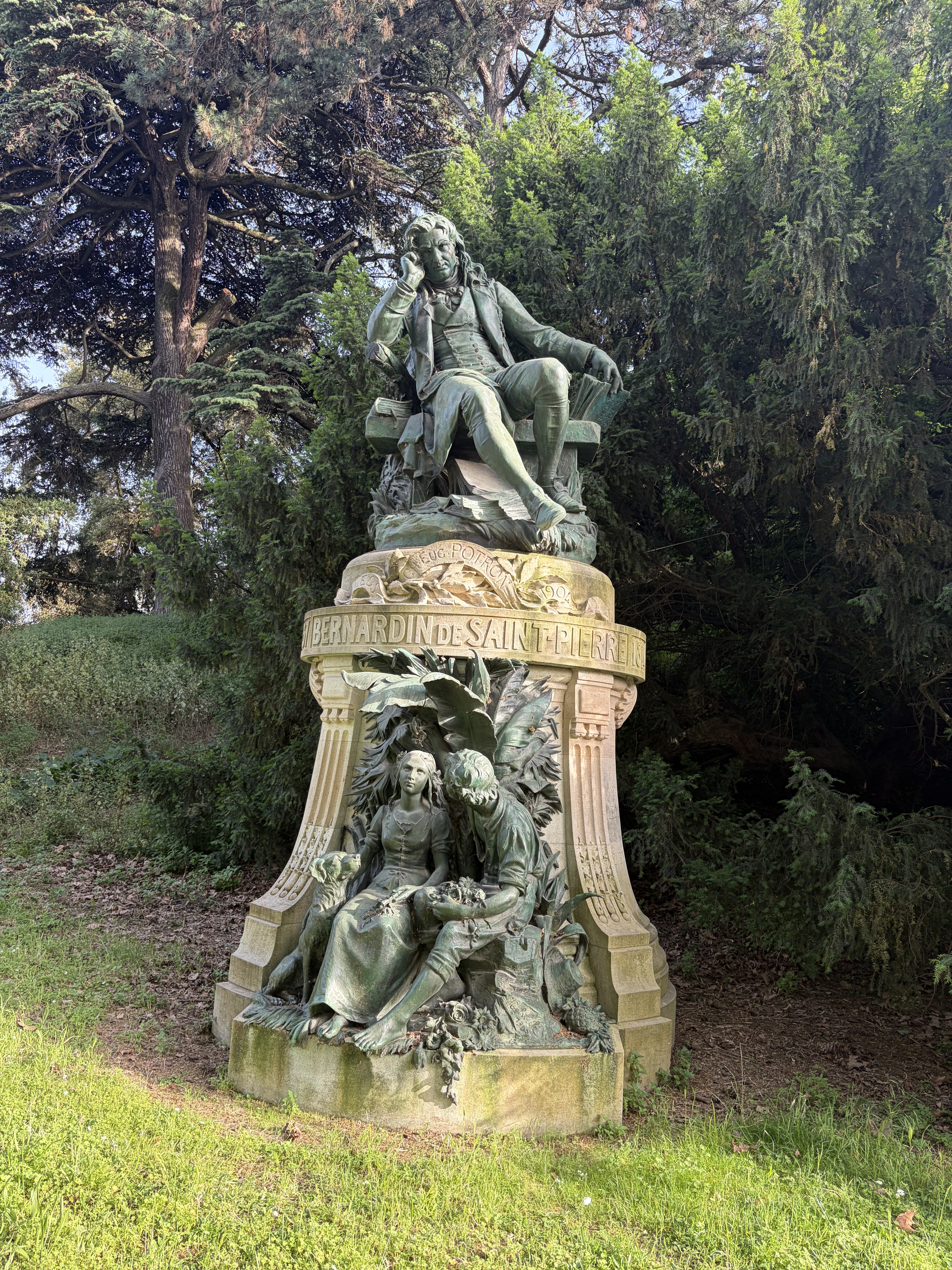
Monument to Bernardin de Saint-Pierre at the Jardin des plantes in Paris.

Alexander von Humboldt, next to Charles Darwin the best known naturalist of the nineteenth century, belonged to the admirers of Bernardin de Saint-Pierre and cherished the novel Paul et Virginie.

== Works ==
- Voyage à l’Île de France, à l’île Bourbon et au cap de Bonne-Espérance (1773)
- L’Arcadie (1781)
- Études de la nature (1784)
- Paul et Virginie (1788)
- La Chaumière indienne (1790)
- Le Café de Surate (1790)
- Les Vœux d’un solitaire (1790)
- De la nature de la morale (1798)
- Voyage en Silésie (1807)
- La Mort de Socrate (1808)
- Harmonies de la nature (1815)

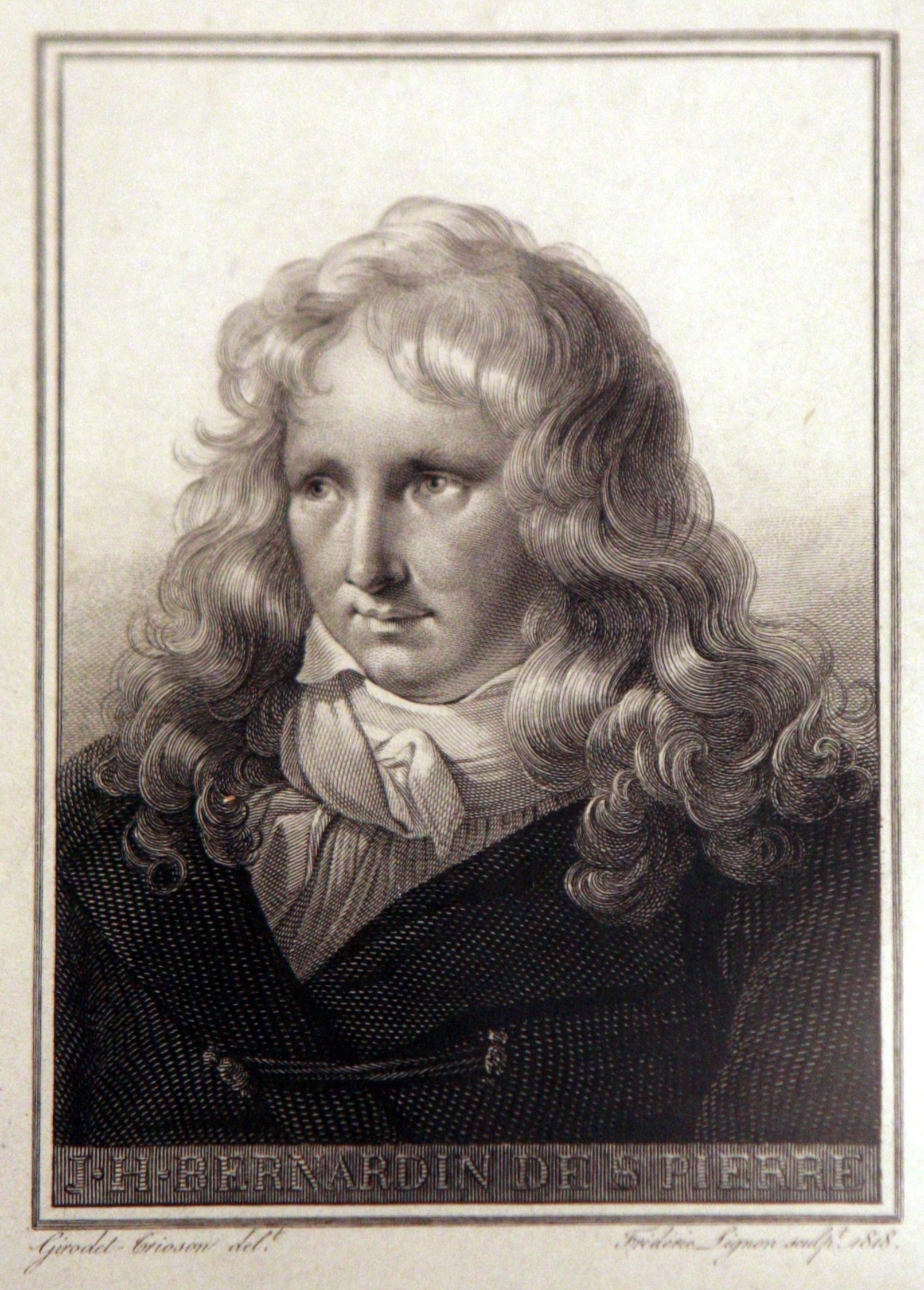

== See also ==
- Society of the Friends of Truth
