= Shep's Race with Death =

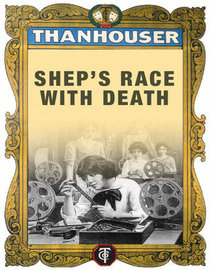
- Directed by: Jack Harvey
- Starring: Shep the Dog, Mrs. Whitcove, and J.S. Murray
- Production company: Thanhouser Company
- Release date: November 1, 1914
- Running time: 12 minutes, 27 seconds
- Country: USA
- Language: Silent

The full film

Shep's Race with Death is a 1914 American short silent drama film, directed by Jack Harvey for the Thanhouser Company. It stars Shep the Dog, Mrs. Whitcove, and J.S. Murray. The film about a "collie dog [who] wins a race with death, saves the life of his mistress, and causes a happy family reunion", was released on November 1, 1914.

== Plot ==
Shep plays the much-adored companion of a bourgeois couple's adolescent twin daughters.

When the children's grandmother arrives one day showing a clear preference for one twin over the other, she provokes a mischievous response from the spurned child that gets Shep in trouble, too.

The grandmother leaves the house with her daughter and favored granddaughter in tow, resulting in an unhappy separation for the three playmates until a runaway horse-and-buggy spurs Shep to action.

He saves the day and the family reunites in prayerful thanks.

== Cast ==
- Shep the Dog as himself
- Mrs. Whitcove as Mrs. Mateland
- J.S. Murray as Mr. Stearns
- Marie Rainford as Mrs. Stearns
- Marion Fairbanks as a twin
- Madeline Fairbanks as a twin

== Reception ==
Released in November 1914, a month after A Dog's Love, the picture was less well-received than Harvey's debut film. The Bioscope wrote on February 11, 1915: "A somewhat tepid and not very convincing story of a dog which saves a little girl's life and thereby brings her parents together again. Very prettily acted, but the plot is very artificial and conventional." However, The Moving Picture World wrote on November 14, 1914: "The mother-in-law's appearance temporarily wrecks the home of the girl twins, the mother and father separating, each taking a child. The events which bring the family together again are very stirring and full of anxious suspense. The big dog, Shep, pulls the runaway horse off the railroad track, where it had stopped, thus saving the life of one twin. This is well-pictured and very entertaining."

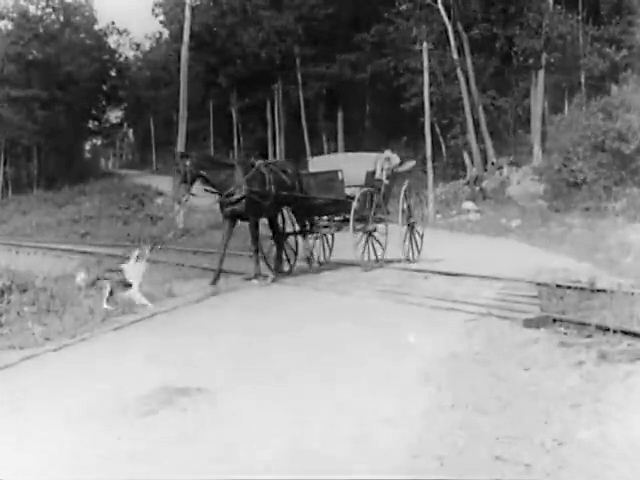

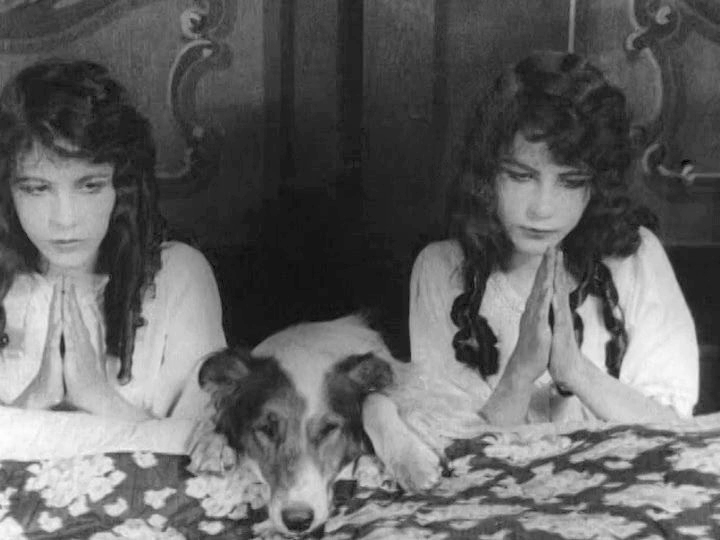
