= The Heart of Ezra Greer =

1917 American silent drama film directed by Emile Chautard

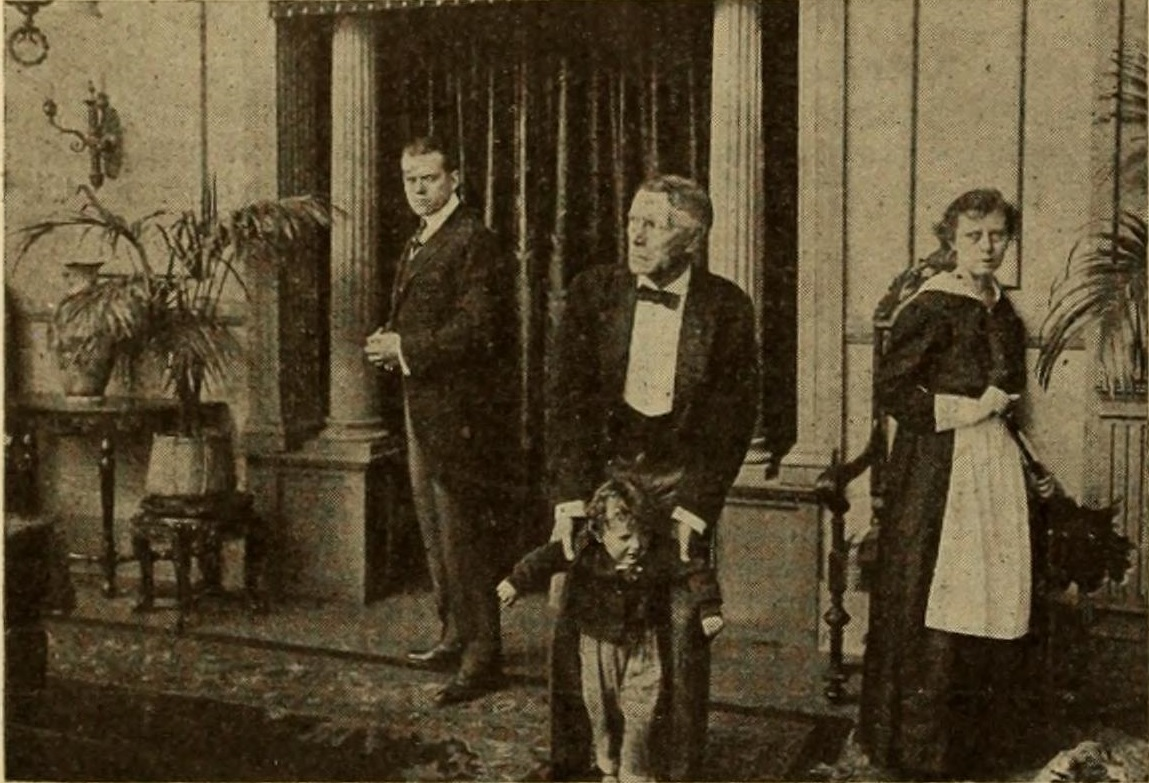
- A surviving film still
- Directed by: Emile Chautard
- Written by: Lloyd F. Lonergan
- Produced by: Thanhouser Company
- Starring: Frederick Warde
- Cinematography: Jacques Bizeul
- Distributed by: Pathé
- Release date: October 7, 1917
- Country: United States
- Languages: Silent film English intertitles

The Heart of Ezra Greer is a 1917 American silent drama film produced by the Thanhouser Company and directed by Emile Chautard. The film focuses on Ezra Greer, a successful middle-aged man who searches for his college age daughter, Mary. The wayward Mary was romanced and abandoned by Jack Denbeigh, later bearing his child. Once Ezra becomes broke he finds employment as the valet for Jack Denbeigh. After Jack's engagement to a cabaret girl, Mary becomes upset and leaves her child at Jack's home. Contrary to Jack's wishes, Ezra keeps the child and Jack ultimately reveals that the child is his own. Ezra convinces Jack to make things right and Ezra convinces the cabaret girl to leave Jack. After a carriage accident in which the baby is injured, Ezra and Jack rush to the hospital and find Mary as a nurse crying over the child. The film ends with the marriage of Jack and Mary. The film was released by Pathé on October 7, 1917. The film was the final release from Thanhouser and was deemed to be an average film by most reviewers. Criticism for the film hinged on far-fetched coincidences to drive the plot. The film is presumed lost.

== Plot ==
The film follows Ezra Greer, a middle-aged man who has worked hard since his youth. He cares deeply for his motherless daughter, Mary, but was unable to attend the annual commencement at her co-educational college. He awaits her to return from college, but Mary leaves with her romantic interest, Jack Denbeigh. On promise of marriage and wealth, Mary is romanced and gives birth to a fatherless child. Without word from his daughter, Ezra resigns from his job and attempts to seek her out and finds a poor motherless child, Marie. With Ezra's money exhausted he seeks employment and finds it as the valet of Jack.

One day, Mary seeks an announcement of Jack's engagement to a cabaret girl known as "The Baby Vamp". Bitter over the prospect of her child's future, she leaves the child at Jack's home during his absence with a note. Jack orders Ezra to take the baby to an orphanage, but Marie begs Ezra to keep him. After continually seeing the child, Jack is overcome with remorse and explains to Ezra and seeks his advice. Not knowing he was making the case for his own daughter, Ezra convinces Jack to seek out Mary and forget the Baby Vamp. The Baby Vamp seeks out Jack, but finds Ezra who convinces her to leave Jack. Jack's son is later injured in a coach accident and is taken to the hospital. Jack and Ezra rush to the hospital and find Mary, as a nurse, crying over the injured child. Ezra is enraged upon learning that his own daughter was mistreated by Jack, but Mary steps between the two men. Jack apologizes and wants to make it right. The film concludes with Jack and Mary.

== Cast ==
- Frederick Warde as Ezra Greer
- Leila Frost as Mary
- George Forth as Jack Denbeigh
- Thomas A. Curran as Denbeigh's guardian
- Lillian Mueller as Amy Devers
- Carey L. Hastings as Denbeigh's housekeeper
- Helen Badgley as the poor little girl
- Gerald Badgley as the millionaire's baby
- W. Ray Johnston

== Production ==
The film was the final production and release of the Thanhouser Company and it was to be released through Pathé. Numerous factors would play into the winding down and eventual closing of the Thanhouser Film Corporation with much advance notice by Edwin Thanhouser. Q. David Bowers writes that it was easy to understand Thanhouser's decision to retire due to numerous aspects including that releases through Pathé were based on their decision to release or discard the work, the New Rochelle studio was 2,500 miles from the center of the trade activity and the slump in industry tied to World War I. Weeks before the film was released, Variety told of the winding down of the Thanhouser with the studio's staff consisting of Edwin Thanhouser and the bookkeeper, Jessie B. Bishop. The article concluded with the announcement that Lloyd F. Lonergan, the scenario writer of the company, had retired from the company. As it wound down, the Thanhouser Company was announced to have no liabilities would close with a positive bank balance. Little is known of the production of this final film, but it was directed by Emile Chautard from a scenario written by Lloyd F. Lonergan. The cameraman was Jacques Bizeul.

== Release and reception ==
The five reel film was released through the Pathé Exchange as a Pathé Gold Rooster Play on October 7, 1917. Charles E. Wagner of the Exhibitor's Trade Review found it to be a good film with great direction and photography, but was concerned that the stunt in which the baby appeared to be involved in the accident was too real. Wagner stated the film had sufficient action and pathos without sexual suggestiveness; Which should prove a strong program for the Pathé program. Frances Agnew of The Morning Telegraph found it to be an average picture that was not exceptional for audiences, but it would hold sentimental appeal for the average viewer. A reviewer for The New York Dramatic Mirror found the film's excessive use of coincidental meetings to be highly improbable, but found Warde's performance to be excellent and the rest of the cast give good performances. The reviewer said that Emile Chautard had made the improbable story more plausible.

Like many American films of the time, The Heart of Ezra Greer was subject to cuts by city and state film censorship boards. The Chicago Board of Censors required the cutting in Reel 2 of a letter stating, "I cannot face my father," etc., and two closeups of gambling scenes; and in Reel 5 a change of the intertitle "Because it means her whole future" to "Because she is his wife".
