= Check No. 130 =

1915 film

- Directed by: Jack Harvey
- Starring: Boyd Marshall; Muriel Ostriche; Morgan Jones
- Release date: 1915
- Country: USA
- Language: Silent

Check No. 130 is a 1915 American short silent drama film, directed by Jack Harvey. It stars Boyd Marshall, Muriel Ostriche, and Morgan Jones.

== Plot ==
Harry Dana lives in an unhappy marriage because his wife is distrustful and quick to anger. When he learns that his stenographer Doris Hall dreams of studying art he encourages her ambition and gives her a check for four hundred dollars to pay for evening modeling classes.

Not long after Mrs. Dana visits her husband’s office and examines the bank vouchers that have been returned. Among them she finds the checks made out to Doris. Convinced her husband has betrayed her she secretly takes one check and plans to file for divorce. Doris sees Mrs. Dana remove the check but does not immediately tell Dana.

Later Doris learns from another stenographer who works for Mrs. Dana’s lawyer that divorce proceedings are about to begin. Wanting to save Dana’s marriage at any cost Doris goes to the attorney and falsely confesses that she forged the check.

Dana soon receives a note from the lawyer. Confused he gives it to his wife and leaves the house. Reading it Mrs. Dana realizes she has been wrong. She retrieves the hidden check but becomes overwhelmed with guilt and drops it. The paper slips into the fire and is destroyed before she can stop it.

Meanwhile Dana learns the truth and tries to stop Doris from sacrificing herself. At that moment Mrs. Dana rushes into the office and tells them the check has burned. With the evidence gone no legal blame can be placed on anyone. Dana and his wife leave together reconciled at last.

== Characters ==
Muriel Ostriche as Doris Hall.

Boyd Marshall as Boyd Morris.

Morgan Jones as Lawyer Morris aka Boyd's Father.

Ernest C. Warde as Harry Dana.

Virginia Waite as Mrs. Harry Dana.
