= Morgan Jones (actor, born 1879) =

American silent film actor (1879–1951)

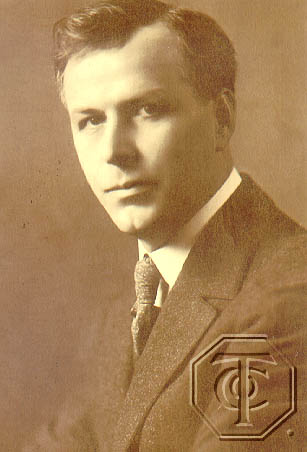
- Jones, c. 1914
- Born: 1879; Denver, Colorado, U.S.
- Died: September 21, 1951 (aged 71–72); New York, New York, U.S.

Morgan Jones (1879 in Denver – September 21, 1951 in New York City) was an American silent film actor and writer.

== Biography ==
Born in Denver, Colorado, Jones had a minor uncredited role in the 1903 early classic The Great Train Robbery, but it was not until 10 years later that he made his mark in film. He is best remembered for roles in films with Shep the Dog, such as A Dog's Good Deed (1914) and The Barrier of Flames (1914) for the Thanhouser Company, but also appeared in films such as The Keeper of the Light (1914) and Out of the Sea (1915). His last known film role was in Mark of the Frog in 1928.

== Partial filmography ==
- The Great Train Robbery (1903)
- The Barrier of Flames (1914)
- The Actor and the Rube (1915)
- Check No. 130 (1915)
- The Stolen Jewels (1915)
- The Country Girl (1915)
- The Picture of Dorian Gray (1915)
- The Black Butterfly (1916)
- Silas Marner (1916)
- The Image Maker (1917)
- The Vicar of Wakefield (1917)
- The House of Mirth (1918)
- Mark of the Frog (1928)
