= The Image Maker =

1917 film by Eugene Moore

- Directed by: Eugene Moore
- Written by: Emmett Mixx
- Produced by: Edwin Thanhouser
- Starring: Valda Valkyrien; Harris Gordon; Inda Palmer
- Cinematography: George Webber
- Production company: Thanhouser Film Corporation
- Distributed by: Pathé Exchange
- Release date: January 21, 1917
- Country: United States
- Languages: Silent; English intertitles

The Image Maker is a 1917 American silent drama film directed by Eugene Moore and starring Valda Valkyrien, Harris Gordon and Inda Palmer.

== Cast ==
- Valda Valkyrien as Ashubetis / Marian Bell
- Harris Gordon as Prince Tsa / John Arden
- Inda Palmer as Mrs. Bell
- Morgan Jones as The Pharaoh
- Arthur Bauer as Maxon
- Boyd Marshall

== Bibliography ==
- Soister, John T. American Silent Horror, Science Fiction and Fantasy Feature Films, 1913-1929. McFarland, 2014.
