= The Stolen Jewels =

The Stolen Jewels can refer to:

- A Stolen Jewel, a 2015 album by Charley Crockett
- The Stolen Jewels (1908 film), a film directed by D. W. Griffith
- The Stolen Jewels (1915 film), a film directed by Jack Harvey
- The Stolen Jools, a 1931 Laurel & Hardy film
