= The Actor and the Rube =

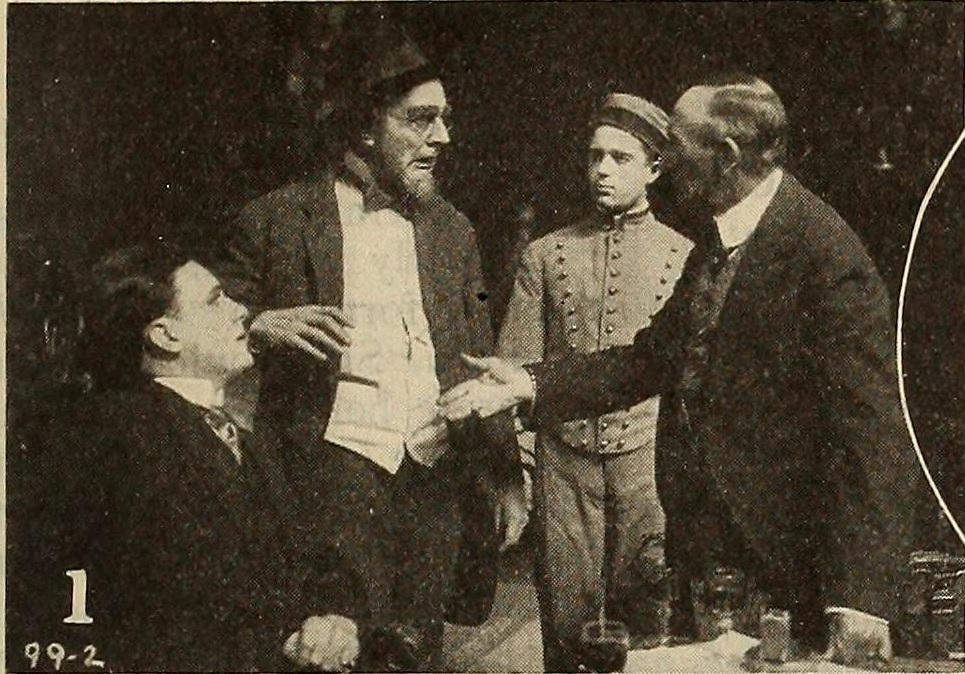
- A film still with Boyd Marshall, Edward N. Hoyt, Leo Post and Riley Chamberlin
- Production company: Thanhouser Company (Falstaff)
- Distributed by: Mutual Film
- Release date: April 16, 1915
- Running time: 1 reel
- Country: United States
- Languages: Silent; English intertitles

The Actor and the Rube is a 1915 American silent short film produced by the Thanhouser Company under the Falstaff brand. Written by Philip Lonergan and directed by Arthur Ellery, this was the first Falstaff release. The production was supervised by Edwin Thanhouser and produced at the New Rochelle studios. The plot of the film is about a cranky farmer, who, disliked by his entire town, decides to head to New York City. An actor disguises himself as the farmer and returns to the farmer's village and makes him popular. After his work is done, the actor tells the farmer to return home and the farmer finds he is well-liked and marries his love interest. The one reel comedy production saw a wide United States release and was also released in the United Kingdom under an alternate title, The Actor and the Bumpkin. Reviews were positive and focused on good acting and originality in the execution of a plot, with the New York Clipper finding it a welcome relief from the "pie-smashing" antics of other comedies.

== Plot ==
Hi Jenkins is a cranky farmer who is disliked by the whole village, including the spinster whom Jenkins wants to marry. Jenkins takes big losses while playing poker and heads to New York City to forget his problems. In New York, an actor takes an interest in impersonating Jenkins and an "accidental meeting" is arranged. The actor studies Jenkins and goes back to the cranky farmer's hometown and becomes popular with the people. The actor also wins at poker and regains the spinster's interest. The actor returns and informs Jenkins to be silent and all will be well when he returns home. Jenkins returns and finds himself to be well-liked, marries his spinster love interest and is no longer cranky.

== Cast ==
- Riley Chamberlin as the actor
- Boyd Marshall as the actor's friend
- Edward N. Hoyt as Hi Jenkins, also known as "the rube"
- Leo Post
- John Reinhard
- Morgan Jones
- Kenneth Clarendon (Hal Clarendon)

== Production ==
The Actor and the Rube was the first production of the new Falstaff brand of the Thanhouser Company. The production was personally supervised by Edwin Thanhouser at the New Rochelle studio. The new Falstaff productions would take the place of the Princess brand films which were doing poorly with the audiences. The scenario was written by Philip Lonergan and the production was directed by Arthur Ellery. The single reel film was approximately 1,015 feet in length. The production included Thanhouser actors, such as Riley Chamberlin, and Princess brand actors such as Boyd Marshall. An advertisement for the film stated that Boyd Marshall and Riley Chamberlain were the lead actors in the production.

== Reception and reception ==
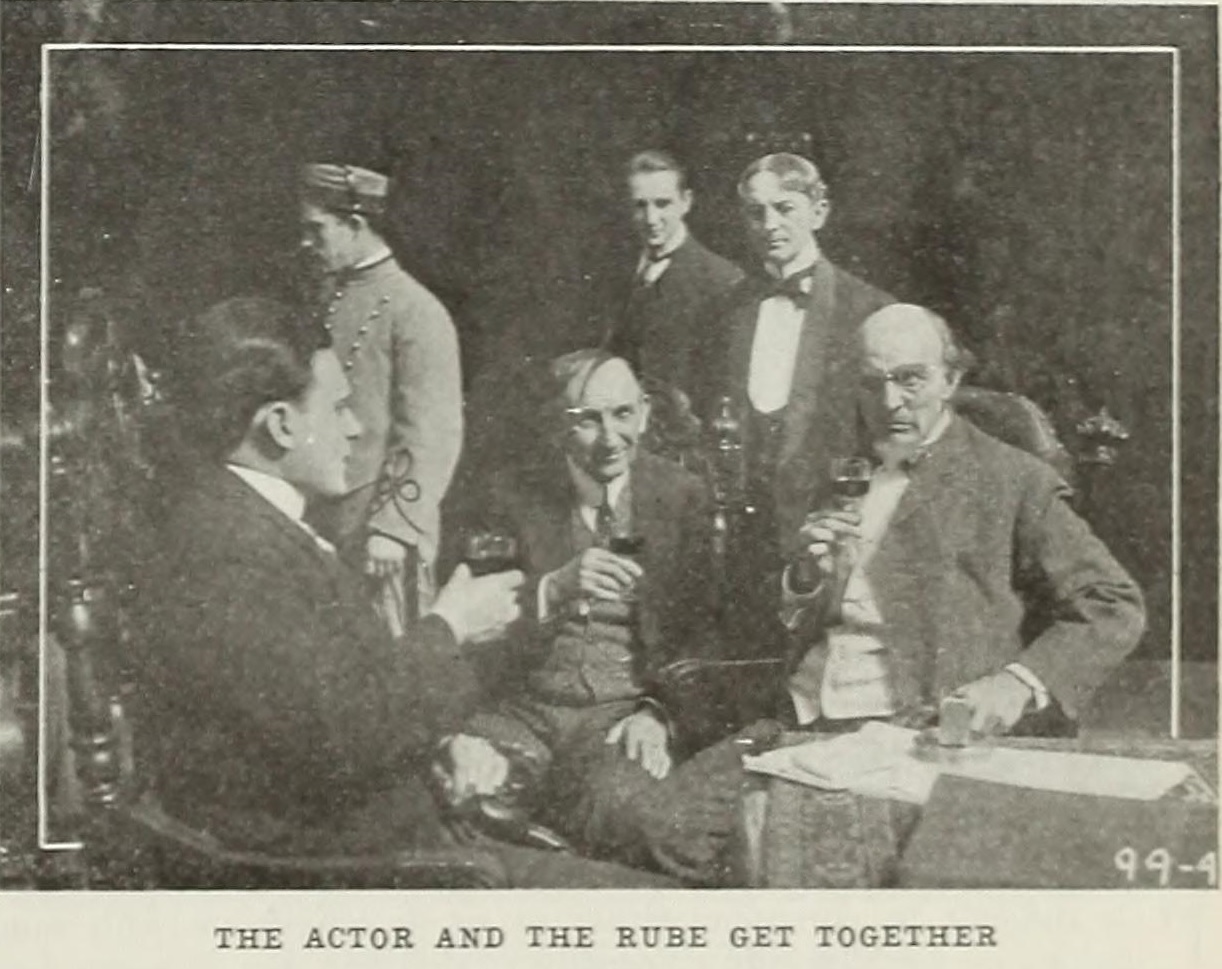
Another film still depicting the Actor and Jenkins alongside other members of the cast.

The film was released on April 16, 1915, with a later British release under the title, The Actor and the Bumpkin on September 30, 1915. The film had a widespread release within the United States with advertised showings in Oregon, Illinois, Pennsylvania South Carolina, Kansas, Atlanta, Georgia, Indiana, New York City, and California.

A Motography review said, "...[it] is a good, wholesome comedy. Not uproariously funny, but it tells a story, and leaves one in good humor." The New York Dramatic Mirror praised the film as having been well-produced and having consistently good acting. Another review in The Moving Picture World was favorable and found the production to be original and pleasing. The New York Clipper found the comedy to be a relief from the "pie-smashing, dough-throwing, acrobatic affairs that a long suffering public has come to regard at the only sort of film comedy to be seen." The Motion Picture News called it an amusing farce that was clever. A more detailed review written by Peter Milne said that the story was not original in concept, but the role of the actor was well-executed by Riley Chamberlain. The film is presumed lost.
