= The Fires of Youth =

- Directed by: Emile Chautard
- Written by: Agnes Christine Johnston
- Produced by: Edwin Thanhouser
- Starring: Frederick Warde; Helen Badgley; Ernest Howard
- Cinematography: Jacques Bizeul
- Production company: Thanhouser Film Corporation
- Distributed by: Pathé Exchange
- Release date: June 17, 1917
- Running time: 52 minutes
- Country: United States
- Languages: Silent; English intertitles

The Fires of Youth (1917)

The Fires of Youth is a 1917 American silent drama film directed by Emile Chautard and starring Frederick Warde, Helen Badgley and Ernest Howard.

== Cast ==
- Frederick Warde as Iron Hearted Pemberton
- Helen Badgley as Billy
- Ernest Howard as Billy's Father
- Jeanne Eagels as Billy's Sister
- Robert Vaughn as Jim
- James Ewens
- Carey L. Hastings
- Grace Stevens

== Bibliography ==
- Robert B. Connelly. The Silents: Silent Feature Films, 1910-36, Volume 40, Issue 2. December Press, 1998.
