= Mitzi Hajos =

American actress (1889–1970)

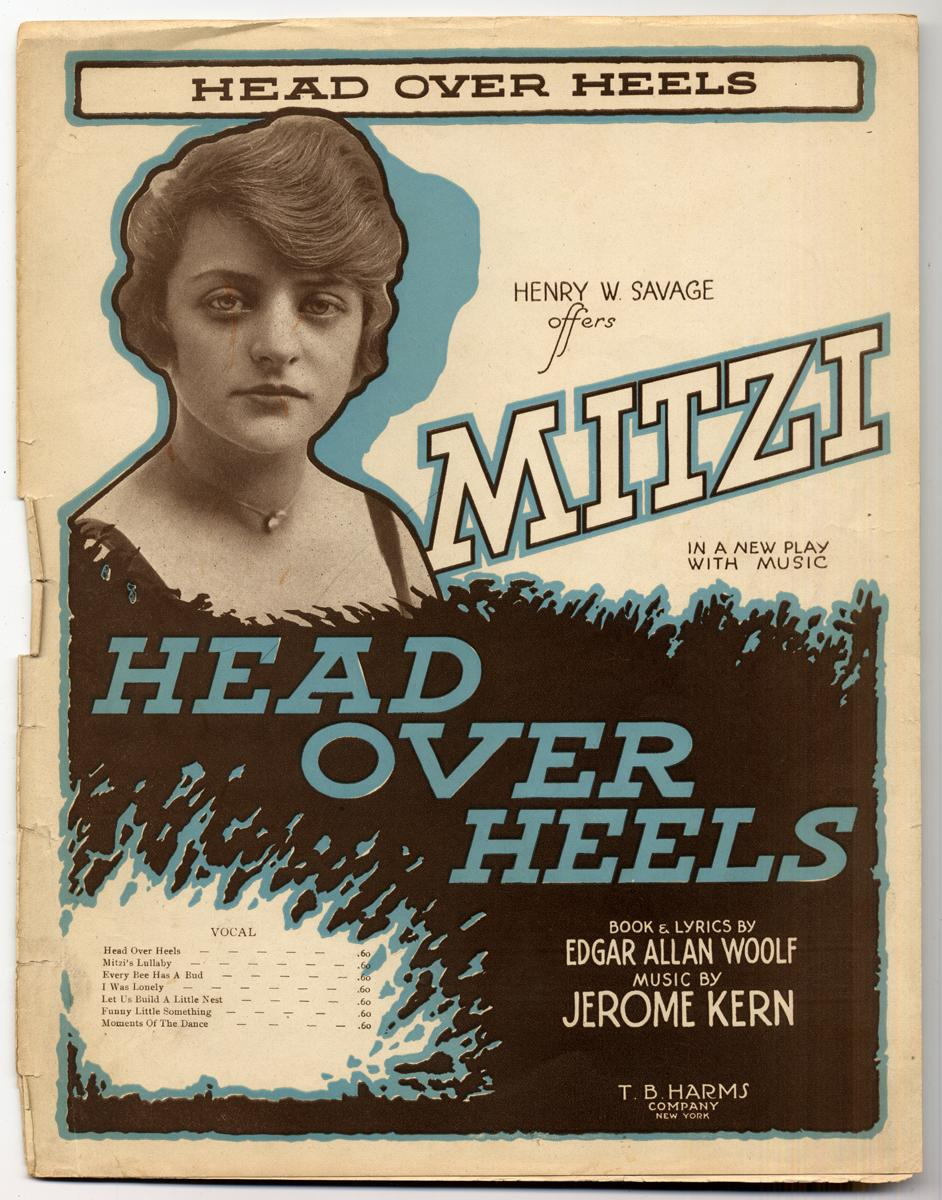
Head over Heels alternative cover

Mitzi Hajos (April 27, 1889 – June 1, 1970), sometimes written as Mizzi Hajos, was a Hungarian-born American stage performer specializing in comic and musical roles.

== Early life ==
Magdalena "Mitzi" Hajos was born in 1889 (some sources give 1891, and Hajos herself gave various dates), near Budapest, Hungary.

== Career ==
As a young teenager she performed in music hall shows in Europe. At age 20, she moved to the United States at the invitation of William Morris to appear in Barnyard Romeo, a show she had performed in Vienna. From 1914 to 1925, she worked exclusively for opera producer Henry Wilson Savage. She was often described as "tiny" and "diminutive", and often played children or characters pretending to be children. A reviewer in the New York Times approved, saying, "she makes such an adorable boy, too." Because her surname was difficult for American audiences, she went by the single name "Mitzi" in programs and publicity materials at the peak of her career.

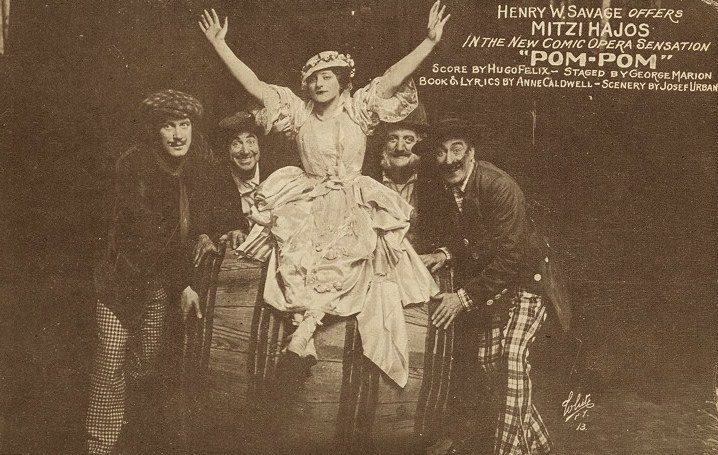
Mitzi Hajos in publicity still for Pom-pom (1916)

Broadway shows she appeared in included La Belle Paree (1911), Her Little Highness (1913), Sari (1914, 1930), Pom-pom (1916), Head over Heels (1918), Lady Billy (1920-1921), The Magic Ring (1923), Naughty Riquette (1926), The Madcap (1928), You Can't Take It With You (1936-1938), Mr. Big (1941), and Cafe Crown (1942). Between Broadway appearances she would tour the United States with her shows.

In 1916, she was named vice president of Sunbeam Motion Picture Corporation. She endorsed Mason & Hamlin Pianos in a 1919 advertisement. The child actress Mitzi Green was given her stage name after Mitzi Hajos in the 1920s. Hajos was drawn at least twice by Broadway illustrator Al Hirschfeld.

In midlife, when roles became scarce and her husband was ill, Hajos worked as a secretary for The Shubert Organization.

== Personal life ==
Mitzi Hajos was married to her frequent co-star Boyd Marshall from 1920 until he died in 1950. By that marriage, she became an American citizen. She died in 1970 in Connecticut, aged 81 years. Her remains were buried in her husband's family's plot in Port Clinton, Ohio.
