= Harris Gordon =

American actor

- Born: July 4, 1884; Glenside, Pennsylvania, United States
- Died: March 31, 1947 (aged 62); Burbank, California
- Occupation: Actor
- Years active: 1914–1934
- Notable work: The Stolen Jewels; The Mill on the Floss
- Spouse: Louise Emerald Bates (m. 1915, divorced)

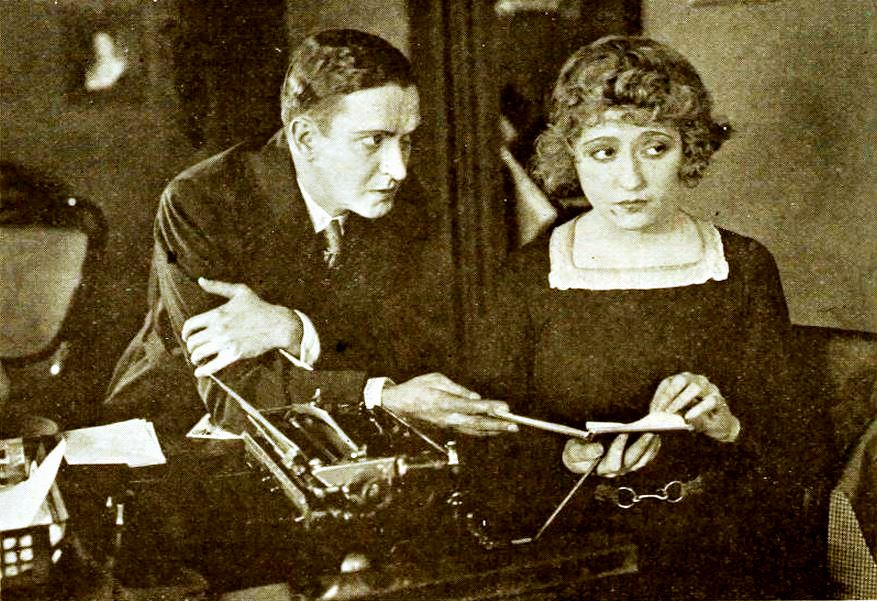
In the 1919 film Suspense

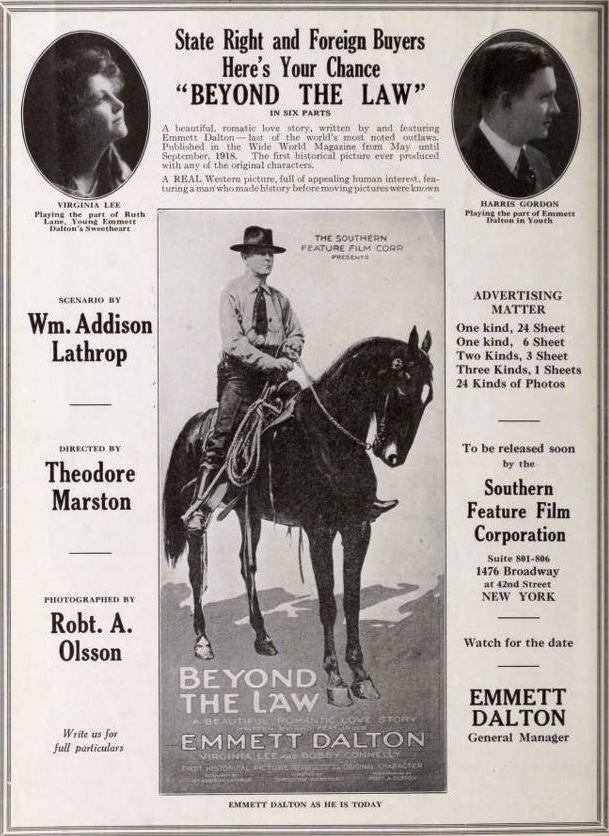

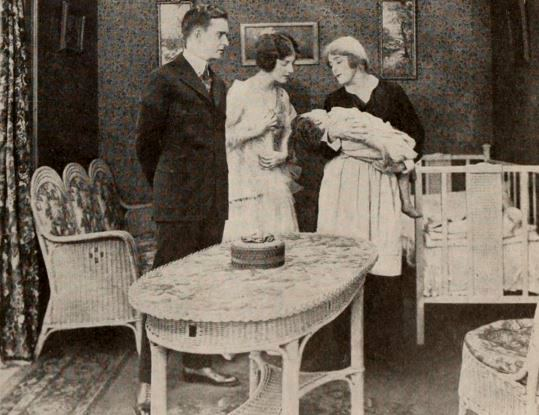
In The Prodigal Wife

Harris Gordon (July 4, 1884 – March 31, 1947) was an American actor born in Glenside, Pennsylvania.

He married actress Louise Emerald Bates. She later remarried to Edmund Mortimer and became Louise Bates Mortimer.

== Filmography ==
- The Picture of Dorian Gray (1915) as Dorian Gray
- The Stolen Jewels (1915)
- Double Crossed (1917) as Tommy Gaylord
- The Image Maker (1917) as Prince Tsa / John Arden
- The Honeymoon (1917) as Philip Lane
- The Mill on the Floss (1918)
- The Prodigal Wife (1918) as Dallas Harvey
- Beyond the Law (1918) as the young Emmett Dalton
- Suspense (1919)
- Stop Thief! (1920) as Dr. Willoughby
- Live and Let Live (1921) as Donald Loomis
- Out of the Silent North (1922) as Reginald Stannard
- A Wonderful Wife (1922) as Nugent
- The Woman Who Walked Alone (1922) as Sir Basil Deere
- Burning Sands (1922) as Secretary
- Hollywood (1923) as Dr. Luke Morrison
- The Dawn of Tomorrow (1924) as Nod
- Romance and Rustlers (1925) as George Wallace
- Too Much Youth (1925) as Ned Crandall
