= King Lear (1916 film) =

1916 film by Ernest C. Warde

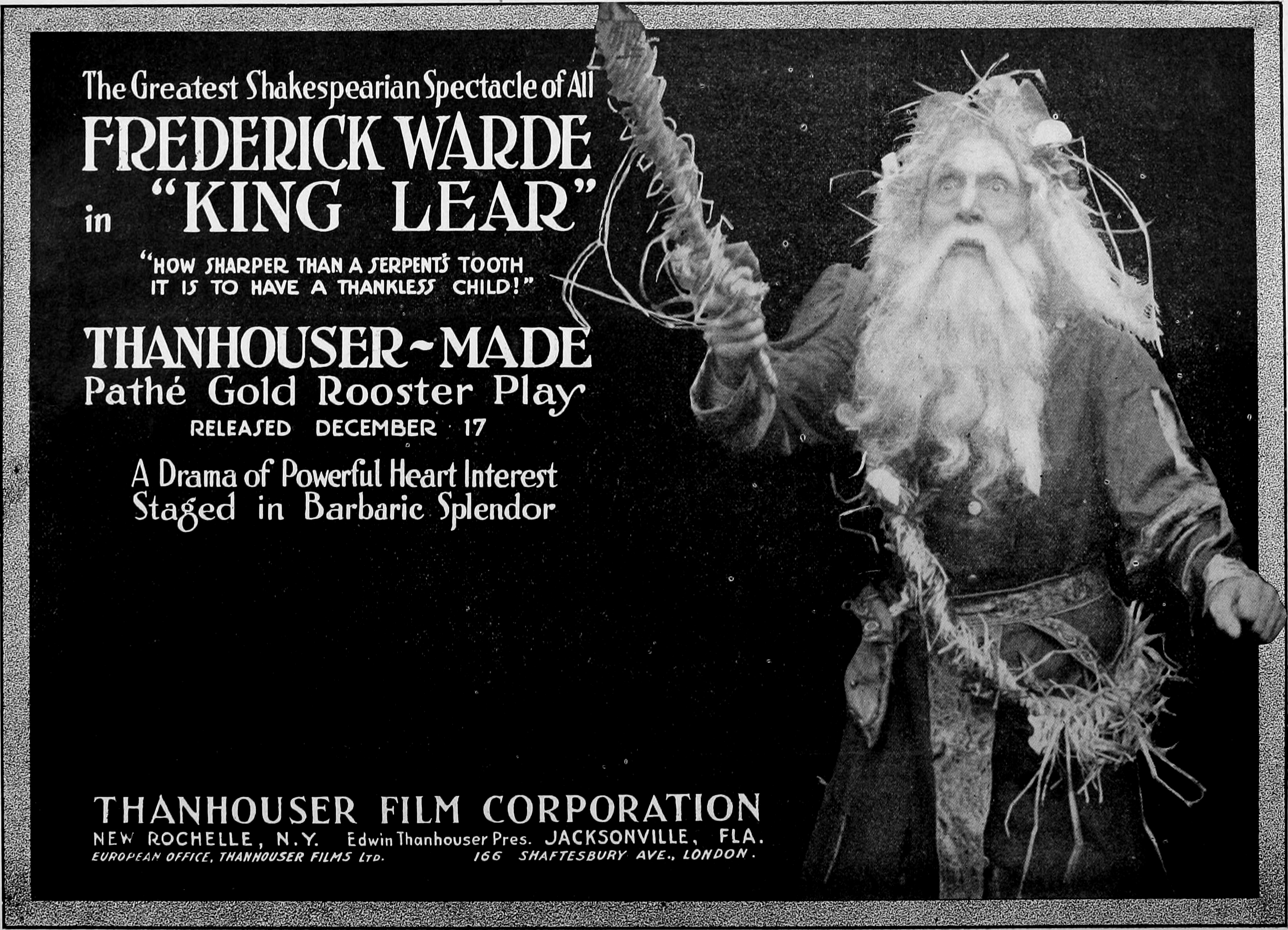
- Directed by: Ernest C. Warde
- Written by: Philip Lonergan
- Story by: William Shakespeare
- Starring: Frederick Warde
- Cinematography: John M. Bauman; William M. Zollinger
- Production company: Thanhouser Company
- Distributed by: Pathé Exchange
- Release date: December 17, 1916
- Running time: 63 minutes
- Country: United States
- Language: English (silent)

King Lear is a 1916 silent film based on the 1606 play, directed by Ernest C. Warde and starring his father, the noted stage actor Frederick Warde. The film is one of a spate of Shakespearean films produced at the time to coincide with the 300th anniversary celebrations of William Shakespeare's death.

King Lear

== Cast ==
- Frederick Warde as King Lear
- Ernest Warde as The King's Fool
- Ina Hammer as Goneril
- Wayne Arey as The Duke of Albany
- Edith Diestal as Regan
- Charles Brooks as The Duke of Cornwall
- Lorraine Huling as Cordelia
- J.H. Gilmour as The Earl of Kent
- Boyd Marshall as The King of France
- Hector Dion as Edmund
- Edwin Stanley as Edgar
- Robert Whittier as Oswald

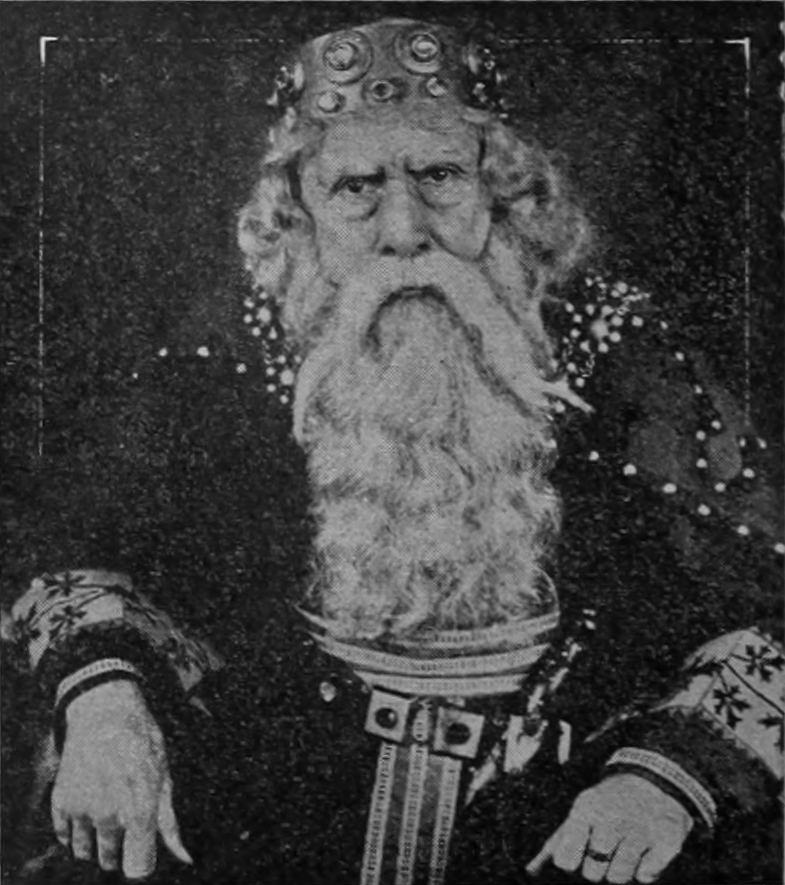
Frederick Warde as King Lear

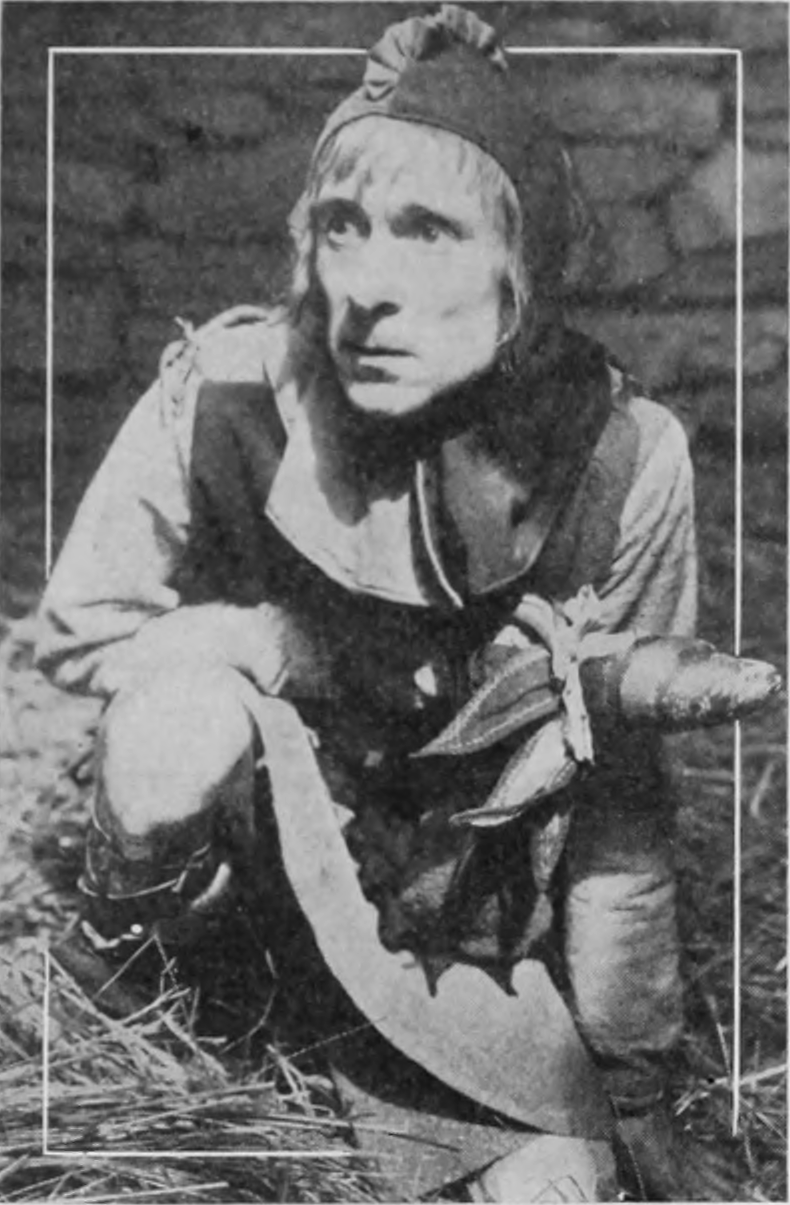
Ernest Warde as the King's Fool

== Plot ==
The synopsis provided by the studio in The Moving Picture World was:

Lear, King of Britain, worn out with the affairs of state, calls his three daughters before to make a division of his kingdom in proportion with the degree of their affection for him. Goneril, the eldest, speaks first and her father with pleased vanity hears her declare that all powers of speech fail to express the extent of her love for him. He bestows upon her one-third of his kingdom. With equal volubility but greater exaggeration Regan, the King's second daughter, likewise wins another third. Cordelia, the youngest daughter, disgusted with her sisters' sordid insincerities, replies that she loves him as far as duty commands. With the other daughters' honeyed flattery in his ears Cordelia's speech fails to please Lear, and he angrily disowns her as an unnatural daughter and gives her share to the others. The young King of France recognizes her true worth and takes her to his own country as his bride.

Then to Lear comes the realization of what he has lost. Eventually the daughters who have the kingdom in their hands close the castle doors on their father, and Lear learns "How sharper than a serpent's tooth it is to have a thankless child." His breaking heart results in madness, and deserted by all save his faithful fool, he becomes a wanderer.

With Cordelia, the King of France invades Britain. Cordelia is made captive and orders given to hang her. To Lear is borne her body which proves the last ill wind to fan out the flame of his flickering life and the tortured soul soon follows hers to "that undiscovered country from whom bourne no traveler ever returns."

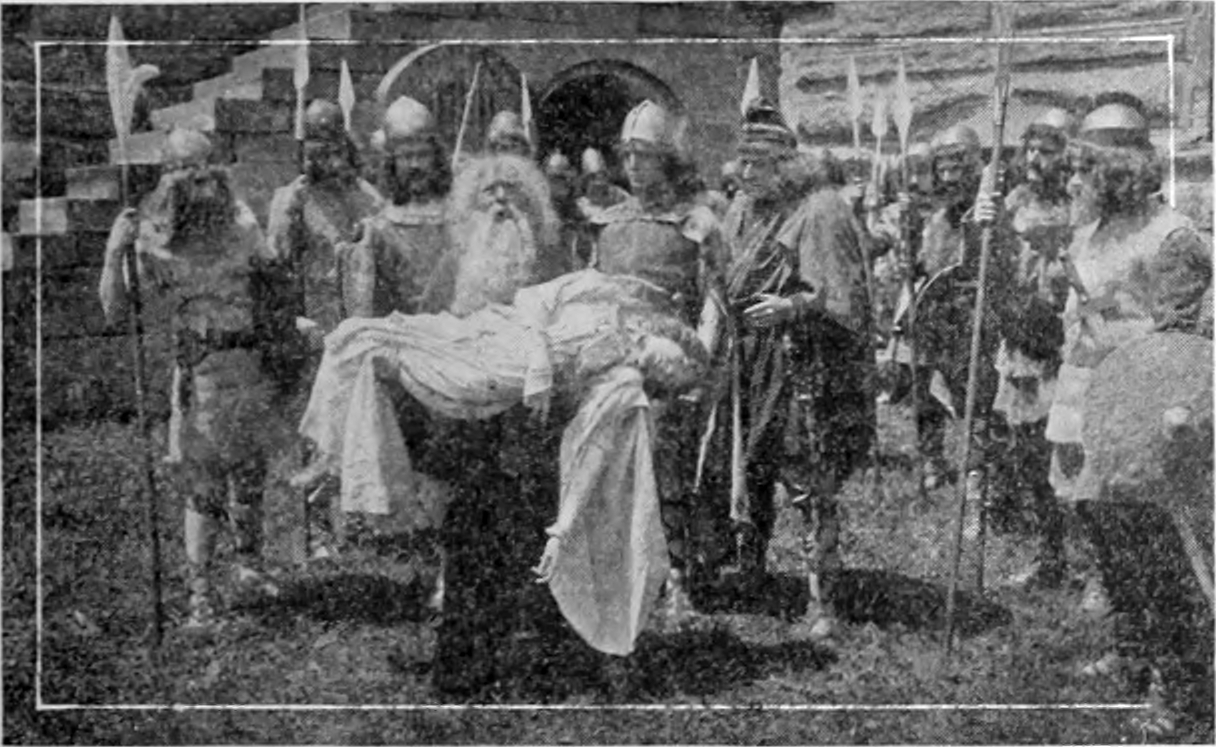
King Lear mourns the death of Cordelia

== Preservation status ==
King Lear survives and was preserved by George Eastman House. It can be found on home video and or DVD.
