= Wrath of Love =

1917 film by James Vincent

- Directed by: James Vincent
- Written by: James R. Carey; Mary Murillo
- Produced by: William Fox
- Starring: Virginia Pearson; Louise Bates; Irving Cummings
- Cinematography: Loren Taylor
- Production company: Fox Film
- Distributed by: Fox Film
- Release date: August 4, 1917
- Running time: 50 minutes
- Country: United States
- Languages: Silent; English intertitles

Wrath of Love is a 1917 American silent drama film directed by James Vincent and starring Virginia Pearson, Louise Bates and Irving Cummings.

== Cast ==
- Virginia Pearson as Roma Winnet
- Louise Bates as Ethel Clarke
- Irving Cummings as Bob Lawson
- Nellie Slattery as Mrs. Lawson
- J. Frank Glendon as Dave Blake
- John McCann as Caddy

== Bibliography ==
- Solomon, Aubrey. The Fox Film Corporation, 1915-1935: A History and Filmography. McFarland, 2011.
