= Laugh It Off (1939 film) =

1939 film directed by Albert S. Rogell

- Directed by: Albert S. Rogell
- Written by: Lee Loeb; Harry Clork; Mortimer Braus
- Produced by: Albert S. Rogell
- Starring: Johnny Downs; Constance Moore; Marjorie Rambeau
- Cinematography: Stanley Cortez
- Edited by: Milton Carruth
- Music by: Charles Previn
- Production company: Universal Pictures
- Distributed by: Universal Pictures
- Release date: December 1, 1939
- Running time: 63 minutes
- Country: United States
- Language: English

Laugh It Off is a 1939 American musical film directed by Albert S. Rogell and starring Johnny Downs, Constance Moore, Marjorie Rambeau and Cecil Cunningham. It was shot at Universal City in Hollywood. The film's sets were designed by the art director Jack Otterson.

== Plot ==
Four veteran actresses are turned out of a retirement home for entertainers when the Spencer Trust that owns it goes bust. One of them gets her lawyer nephew to seek out the only remaining member of the Spencer family, a young woman named Ruth, who proves sympathetic but has no money to help. They next turn to the idea of reopening a failed gambling club as a popular nightclub in which they will all appear and sing. However this threatens to embarrass their respectable relations who try and prevent it.

== Cast ==
- Johnny Downs as Stephen 'Steve' Hannis
- Constance Moore as Ruth Spencer
- Marjorie Rambeau as Sylvia Swan
- Cecil Cunningham as Tess Gibson
- Hedda Hopper as Elizabeth 'Lizzie' Rockingham
- Janet Beecher as Mary Carter
- Edgar Kennedy as Judge John J. McGuinnis
- Tom Dugan as Rod Bates
- William Demarest as Barney 'Gimpy' Cole
- Horace McMahon as Phil Ferrranti
- Paula Stone as Linda Lane
- Chester Clute as Eliot Rigby
- Louise Bates as Ellen
- John Dilson as Dr. Swan
- Gertrude Hoffman as Carrie
- Claire Whitney as Miss Martin
- Lillian West as Sarah
- Alan Edwards as Harvey Carter
- Jack Norton as Thomas J. Carter, the Drunk
- Brooks Benedict as Casino Croupier
- Dale Van Sickel as Policeman
- Fay McKenzie as Chorus Girl

== Bibliography ==
- Hischack, Thomas S.. 1939: Hollywood's Greatest Year. Rowman & Littlefield, 2017.
