= Under False Colors =

- Directed by: Emile Chautard
- Written by: Lloyd F. Lonergan
- Produced by: Thanhouser Company
- Starring: Frederick Warde
- Cinematography: Jacques Bizeul(fr)
- Distributed by: Pathé Exchange
- Release date: September 23, 1917
- Country: United States
- Language: Silent (English intertitles)

Under False Colors is a 1917 American silent drama film produced by the Thanhouser Company and directed by Emile Chautard.

== Plot ==
As described in a film magazine, John Colton (Warde) sends his son Jack (Vaughn) to Russia to compete the details of a loan to that government. While there, Jack assists the Countess Olga (Eagels), who is hounded by spies, out of the country. She sails for America and on the steamer meets Vera Ladislaus (Gregory), who is going to stay with the Coltons. The steamer is torpedoed and Vera loses her life. Olga, on arrival in New York, poses as Vera in order to obtain information in the John Colton home as she has been told that he is aiding the Russian government. After being established in the home, the kindness of the Coltons make her regret her situation. Jack's return home and the arrival of Vera's father complicates matters. However, upon Colton's statement to the assembled Russians at their headquarters that he is really helping the cause of freedom, Olga's true feelings to the Coltons, and especially Jack, are seen.

== Cast ==
- Frederick Warde as John Colton
- Robert Vaughn as Jack Colton
- Carey L. Hastings as Mrs. Colton
- Jeanne Eagels as Countess Olga
- Anne Gregory as Vera Ladislaus

== Production ==
Under False Colors was penultimate film produced by Thanhouser. Numerous factors would play into the winding down and eventual closing of the Thanhouser Film Corporation with much advance notice by Edwin Thanhouser. Q. David Bowers writes that it was easy to understand Thanhouser's decision to retire due to numerous aspects including that releases through Pathé were based on their decision to release or discard the work, the New Rochelle studio was 2,500 miles from the center of the trade activity and the slump in industry tied to World War I. Weeks before the film was released, Variety told of the winding down of the Thanhouser with the studio's staff consisting of Edwin Thanhouser and the bookkeeper, Jessie B. Bishop. The article concluded with the announcement that Lloyd F. Lonergan, the scenario writer of the company, had retired from the company. As it wound down, the Thanhouser Company was announced to have no liabilities would close with a positive bank balance. Little is known of the production of this film, but it was directed by Emile Chautard from a scenario written by Lloyd F. Lonergan. The cameraman was Jacques Bizeul.

== Release and reception ==
The five reel film was released through the Pathé Exchange as a Pathé Gold Rooster Play on September 23, 1917.

== Survival ==
The film is presumed to be lost.
