= Fannie Bourke =

American stage and film actress

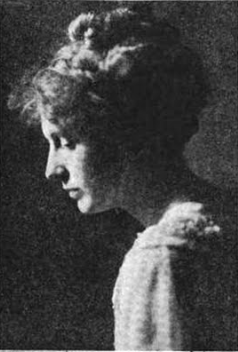
- c. 1915
- Born: July 12, 1886; Brooklyn, New York, US
- Died: March 9, 1959 (aged 72); Norwalk, Connecticut, US
- Occupation(s): stage and film actress, suffragist, motion picture exhibitor
- Years active: 1912–1933

Fannie Bourke, also known as Fan Bourke or Fannie Burke, (July 12, 1886 – March 9, 1959) was an American stage and film actress, suffragist, and motion picture exhibitor. She worked on Broadway and appeared in silent films from the 1910s until the early 1930s.

== Biography ==
Fannie Bourke was born on July 12, 1886, in Brooklyn, New York. She began her career as a vaudeville performer, pianist, and dancer, and was known for singing "dialect songs" and impersonating "every possible nationality." She appeared on Broadway in the play Mere Man in 1912.

Bourke became a stock player for Thanhouser Company in late 1913. She appeared frequently in Thanhouser productions between 1914 and 1915, including A Dog's Love and Percy's First Holiday. After leaving Thanhouser, Bourke worked as an actress for Arrow Film Corporation.

In late 1915, Bourke took over a failing 500-seat movie theatre, The Princess, in New Rochelle, New York (where Thanhouser had its studio); she transformed it into a "votes for women" movie theatre, with a lobby decorated in women's suffrage banners. In addition to showing Mutual Film pictures, including Thanhouser films in which she appeared, Bourke performed every Wednesday. She hired another former Thanhouser actress, Julia Miller, to play the piano at the theatre. She also hosted events for the local women's clubs.

In 1916, Bourke married Charles Mather.

Bourke later appeared in The Love Expert (1920) and Lummox (1930), her only known sound film role. She continued appearing on Broadway through the 1920s and early 1930s.

Bourke's last stage appearance was in the musical revue As Thousands Cheer. She died on March 9, 1959, in Norwalk, Connecticut.
