= Richard III (1912 film) =

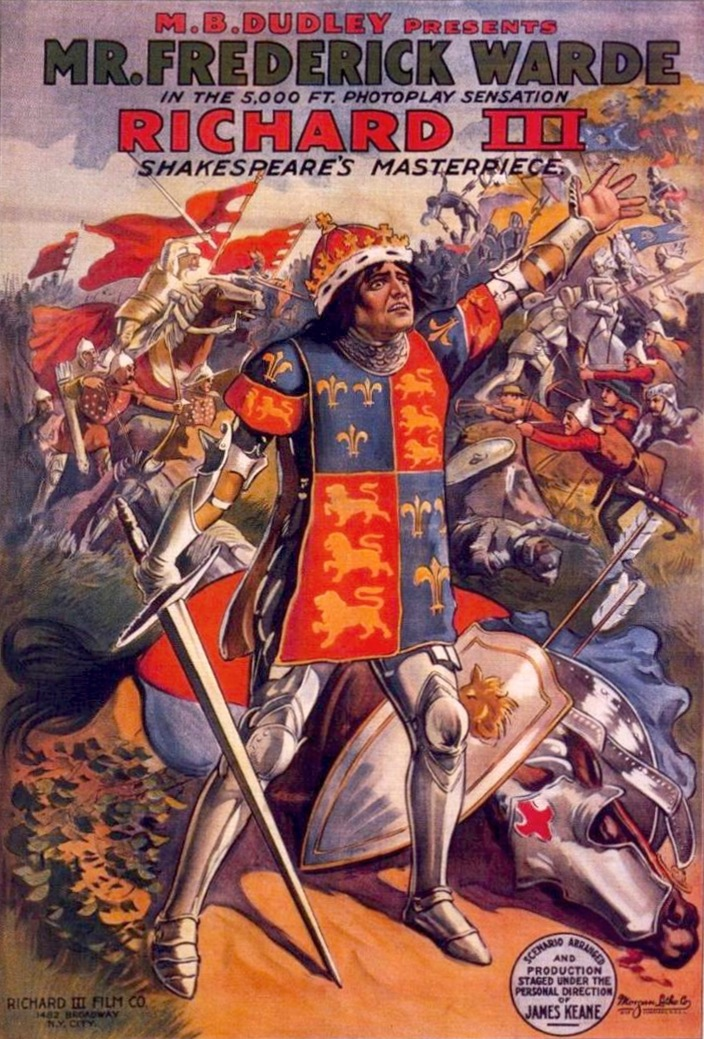
- Directed by: André Calmettes; James Keane
- Written by: James Keane
- Based on: Richard III (1592–94 play) by William Shakespeare; Richard III (1699 play) by Colley Cibber
- Produced by: J. Stuart Blackton; M.B. Dudley
- Starring: Frederick Warde
- Production companies: Richard III Film Co., Inc. and Shakespeare Film Co.
- Distributed by: States Rights Independent Exchanges
- Release date: October 15, 1912
- Running time: 55 minutes
- Country: United States
- Language: Silent
- Budget: $30,000 (estimated)

Richard III (The Life and Death of King Richard III) (1912)

Richard III (also known as The Life and Death of King Richard III) is a 1912 silent film adaptation of William Shakespeare's play, co-directed by André Calmettes and American playwright James Keane, and starring Frederick Warde as the title character. The 55-minute film, was produced by Richard III Film Co. Inc. and Shakespeare Film Co.

Richard III was adapted from Shakespeare's original and Colley Cibber's 1699 adaptation of the same name. The film was written by Keane, who also appears as Richmond. Filming took place around Westchester, New York and City Island Long Island Sound.

== Cast ==
- Frederick Warde as Richard, Duke of Gloucester
- Robert Gemp as King Edward IV
- Albert Gardner as Prince Edward of Lancaster
- James Keane as Henry Tudor, 2nd Earl of Richmond
- George Moss as Tressel
- Howard Stuart as King Edward V
- Virginia Rankin as York
- Violet Stuart as Lady Anne Plantagenet
- Carey Lee as Queen Elizabeth
- Carlotta De Felice as Princess Elizabeth

== Release and rediscovery ==
When the film was released in the U.S., actor Frederick Warde would often appear at screenings, giving a short lecture, and then reading extracts from the play during the changing of the reels, which were then called "acts". The film itself begins with Warde, in modern dress, emerging from behind a theatrical curtain and bowing, and concludes with him bowing again, and returning behind the curtain. A traveling actor, Warde discovered it was more economical to single-handedly tour with the film rather than perform the play with an entire theatrical company. The film also features two scenes from 3 Henry VI (the murder of Prince Edward and Richard's murder of Henry VI).

It is the oldest surviving American feature-length film, and is also thought to be the first feature-length Shakespearean adaptation ever made. As early as 1922, the film was thought lost. It was not until 1996 that a print was discovered, when William Buffum, former projectionist at the Bluebird Theatre in Portland, Oregon, donated his copy to the American Film Institute. The AFI restored the print, transferring it from its nitrate film stock and retouching the hand tinting effect used in the original 1912 release.

On June 26, 2001, Kino International released the film on DVD, with a newly composed score by Ennio Morricone, and a 17-minute documentary film "Rediscovering Richard: Looking Back on a Forgotten Classic".

== See also ==
- List of rediscovered films
