= Thomas A. Curran =

Australian-American actor (1886–1964)

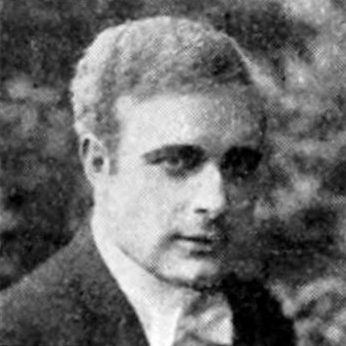
- Curran in 1916
- Born: May 29, 1879; Sydney, New South Wales, Australia
- Died: January 24, 1941 (aged 61); Hollywood, California, U.S.
- Occupation: Actor
- Years active: 1897–1941

Thomas A. Curran (May 29, 1879 – January 24, 1941) was an Australian-born American actor on the stage and in motion pictures. Between 1915 and 1941 he appeared in 60 films, the last of which was Citizen Kane, in which he played the uncredited role of Theodore Roosevelt in the "News on the March" newsreel sequence.

== Biography ==
Thomas A. Curran was born on May 29, 1879, in Sydney, Australia. He studied acting in the United States, where he made his stage debut in 1897. After returning to Australia for a few years, he returned to the U.S. in 1912 or 1913 and worked in vaudeville and repertory theatre. He acted in the original productions of Excuse Me written by Rupert Hughes (later adapted twice for the screen) and Oh! Oh! Delphine.

Curran was signed to a three-year contract by the Thanhouser Company in 1915 and made 22 films, including The World and the Woman with Jeanne Eagels and Inspiration, the first non-pornographic American film to show full female nudity. In his later years he moved to California and made his living playing bit parts and small roles in studio films. His last film appearance was as Teddy Roosevelt in the "News on the March" sequence in Citizen Kane. The film had not yet been released when Curran, aged 61, died in Hollywood on January 24, 1941.

== Filmography ==
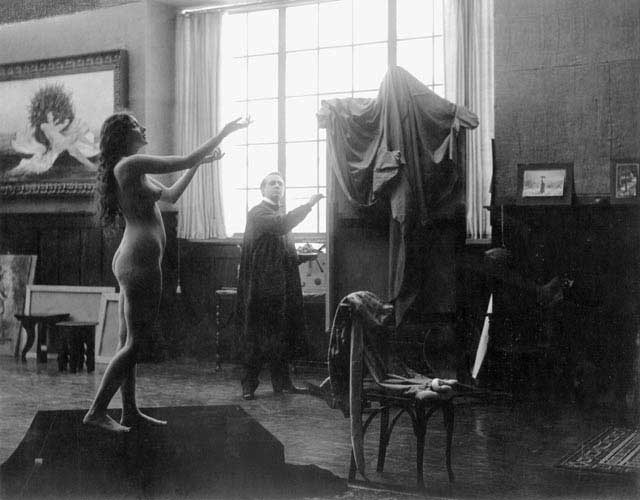
Audrey Munson and Thomas A. Curran in Inspiration (1915)

The Vicar of Wakefield (1917)

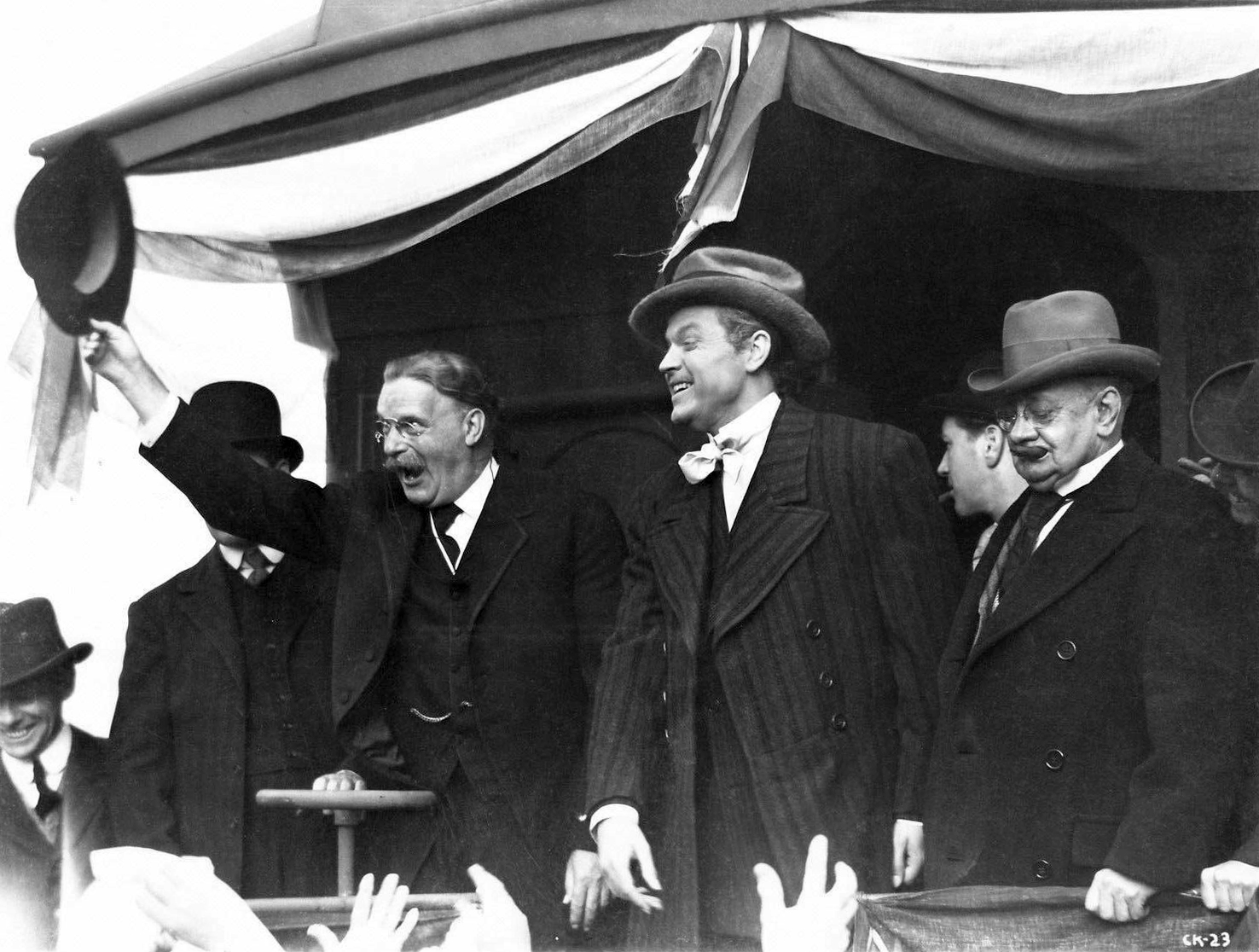
Curran (waving hat) as Theodore Roosevelt, campaigning with Charles Foster Kane (Orson Welles) in the "News on the March" sequence in Citizen Kane (1941)

Year	Title	Role	Notes
1915	From the River's Depths		
1915	The Price of Her Silence	The Artist	
1915	The Earl of Pawtucket	Fordyce	
1915	Greater Love Hath No Man	Dr. Merton	
1915	The Commuted Sentence	Governor	
1915	In Baby's Garden	Jack	
1915	Inspiration	The Artist	Reissued as The Perfect Model (1918)
1915	Her Confession	Emerald Vinton	
1915	The Necklace of Pearls	The Banker	
1916	The Bubbles in the Glass		
1916	Silas Marner	Godfrey	
1916	The Cruise of Fate		
1916	The Sailor's Smiling Spirit		
1916	The Weakling		
1916	The Nymph		
1916	Brothers Equal		
1916	The Black Terror		
1916	The World and the Woman	James Palmer	
1917	A Modern Monte Cristo	William Deane	
1917	The Vicar of Wakefield	Geoffrey; Mr. Burchell	
1917	When Love Was Blind	John Grayson	
1917	The Candy Girl		
1917	An Amateur Orphan		
1917	The Heart of Ezra Greer	Denbeigh's guardian	
1918	The Girl and the Judge	Frank Lorimer	
1928	Ships of the Night	Police chief	
1928	The Black Pearl	Silas Lathrop	
1929	Object: Alimony	Philip Stone	
1929	Two Sisters	Judge Rhodes	
1929	Anne Against the World	Emmett	
1929	The Phantom in the House	Judge Thompson	
1930	The Kibitzer	Briggs	
1930	Worldly Goods	Secretary	
1930	Morocco		
1931	Mother and Son	Broker	
1932	Ghost City		
1934	David Harum	Banker	
1935	The Cowboy Millionaire	Hotel clerk	
1935	Annapolis Farewell	Officer on Congress	
1936	The Milky Way		
1936	Mr. Deeds Goes to Town		
1936	The White Angel	Officer in barracks	
1936	Yours for the Asking		
1936	Wanted! Jane Turner		
1936	Swing Time		
1936	Parole!	Board chairman	
1937	Champagne Waltz		
1937	Wells Fargo		
1939	Our Leading Citizen	Member	
1941	Citizen Kane	Theodore Roosevelt	
