= The Man Hunt =

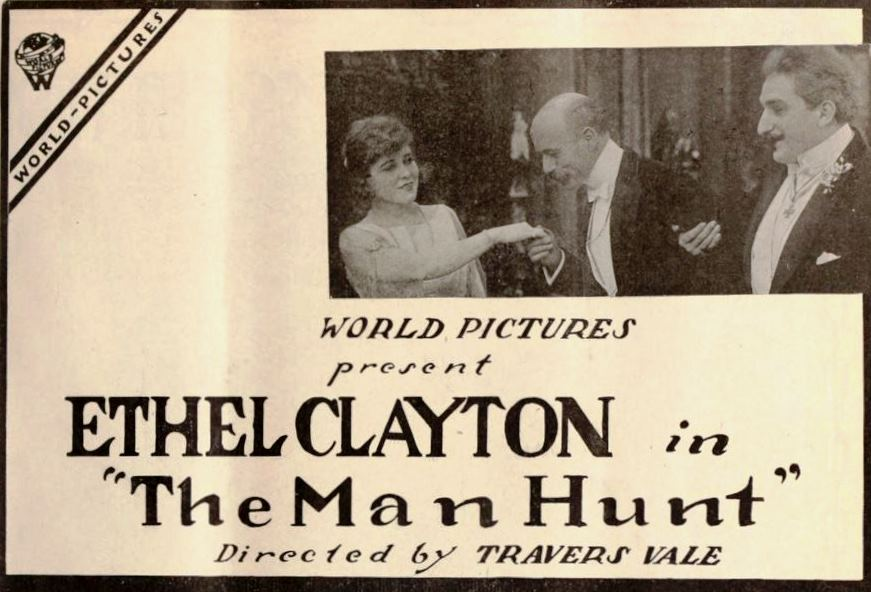
- Half page advertisement for the American comedy drama film The Man Hunt (1918) with Ethel Clayton and two unidentified actors, on page 3 of the July 6, 1918 Exhibitors Herald
- Directed by: Travers Vale
- Written by: Virginia Tyler Hudson; Frederick J. Jackson
- Starring: Ethel Clayton; Rockliffe Fellowes; Henry Warwick
- Cinematography: Philip Hatkin
- Distributed by: World Film Company
- Release date: June 17, 1918
- Running time: 50 minutes
- Country: United States
- Language: Silent

The Man Hunt is a 1918 silent comedy drama film directed by Travers Vale. It used a story by Fred Jackson originally titled A Modern Girl and a scenario by Virginia Tyler Hudson. Released by the New Jersey–based World Film Company, the film consisted of five reels and was 50 minutes long. The film premiered on June 10, 1918. The cinematographer was Philip Hatkin.

== Plot ==
Betty Hammond is extremely wealthy, single, and lonely; having come into a fortune only recently. She decides to find a husband, but all of the appropriate landed gentry and affluent men bore her, and she can never be certain whether her suitors want her or her money. She searches for James Ogden; a man with whom she was romantically attached to as a young girl but has not seen for many years. She finds him as a poor laborer in a lumber camp. Betty pretends to be a humble stenographer in order to conceal her wealth and societal position. The two renew their romance, and Betty now secure in the knowledge that she is loved for herself, reveals the truth in James. He does not take it well, and she ends up kidnapping Ogden and a minister with aid of armed men stating she will not let them go until Ogden marries her. After further drama, all eventually ends happily in marriage.

== Cast ==
- Ethel Clayton as Betty Hammond
- Rockliffe Fellowes as James Ogden
- Henry Warwick as English Lord
- John Ardizoni (credited as John Adrizonia) as French Count
- Herbert Barrington as Russian Prince
- Jack Drumier as Parson Brown
- Al Hart as Bigfoot Ben
- John Dungan as Lemuel Thomas
