= A Dog's Love =

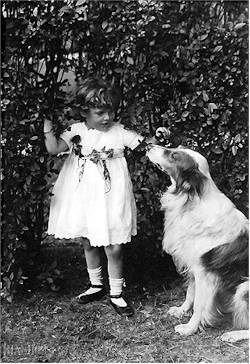
- Directed by: Jack Harvey
- Written by: Nolan Gane
- Starring: Shep the Dog, Helen Badgley, and Arthur Bauer
- Music by: Andrew Crow
- Production company: Thanhouser Company
- Release date: October 4, 1914
- Running time: 11 minutes, 12 seconds
- Country: USA
- Language: Silent

A Dog's Love

A Dog's Love is a 1914 American short silent fantasy drama film with subtitles, directed by Jack Harvey on his directorial debut. It stars Shep the Dog, Helen Badgley, and Arthur Bauer. The film is about a dog who loses his best friend, when a young girl is killed in an automobile accident, and focuses on his emotions in dealing with his loss. Well-received because of its "universally appealing" theme, the dog's emotions were reported as surpassing the child's histrionics.

The film was shot on one reel by the Thanhouser Company, 1,007 feet (307 m) in total. It was shot in standard 35mm and a spherical 1.37:1 format. It was distributed by the Mutual Film Corporation upon release. Kitty Kelly of the Chicago Tribune called it a "miniature masterpiece." Copies of the film are in the Museum of Modern Art of New York City and the National Film, Television and Sound Archive of Ottawa film archive.

== Plot ==
The film opens with an inter-title that reads "Poor little rich girl has no one to play with" and cuts to Baby Helen with her doll, looking out the window. A group of children play Ring a Ring o' Roses in the yard. Next, Baby Helen goes to tea party set up on the yard and holds her doll, all by herself, with a lonely expression. The neighbor's dog, Shep comes out of his dog house and barks, and Baby Helen rises with a joyful expression. She takes a piece of a muffin and tosses it through the boxwood hedge separating the two yards. Shep eats the muffin and Helen invites him to her tea party. Shep runs along the hedge and passes through to join her. Helen instructs Shep with her finger and Shep barks in understanding, Helen takes her seat and shares a muffin with Shep. An inter-title announces that a week later, Helen is out on an errand. Helen passes through the hedge and skips down the sidewalk and Shep barks at her. As Helen crosses the street, she is struck by a passing automobile and Shep races to the rescue. He tugs at her dress at the waist and finding that he is unable to move her, runs to Helen's home and jumps against the screen door, barking repeatedly. As Helen's parents are summoned, Shep leads them to Helen, where a passerby has scooped up Helen from the middle of the street. All three depart and the scene changes to a dimly lit room with Helen laid on a bed, seemingly dead. Her parents watch over her, with sad faces as a doctor inspects her and folds her arms across her chest. Beyond saving, her parents bury their heads in the pillow next to Helen as the doctor pens a note. Then Shep is shown resting against the side of the door in a feeble and sorrowful looking position.

An inter-title confirms Helen's death by announcing the parents have gone on "a visit to their lost darling". The scene cuts to a grassy cemetery with lines of tombstones separated by a loose line of two trees. Helen's parents approach her grave, marked by a group of flowers and a temporary marker at the head. Shep follows behind and pauses by a tree as Helen's parents kneel and pause to grieve. The camera cuts to Shep, who appears sad with his eyes only half open. After the parents finish grieving, they stand up and walk to the stage left. Shep stays under the tree for a moment before approaching the grave. Through an overheard split, Shep is shown to be reminiscing about the party. The next scene shows Shep back home, lying on his side in apparent despair. His master tries to get Shep to eat some food, but the Collie refuses and turns on his side. His master pets him, confused as to what has his pet troubled so, but he gives up and departs.

Another inter-title announces that "Shep makes daily visit to the florist" and shows Shep approach the shop and grabs a bunch of flower in his mouth before running away. Shep returns to her grave and he drops his flowers with the others. Shep looks to the left and sees a woman watering the flowers. Shep takes her watering can and runs back to Helen's grave. The woman picks up the watering can and waters the flowers and picks up the flower bouquet brought by Shep. An inter-title announces that night has come and it shows Shep lying asleep near the hedge. A ghostly image of Helen, superimposed on the film, appears through hedge and awakens Shep. Helen leads Shep through the cemetery and to her grave. Shep crawls to her grave and lies across the flowers as Helen's form disappears down into the grave. The camera lingers on Shep before fading. The final inter-title of the film announces "Don't cry, it's only make believe" showing Helen, holding flowers and leaning against Shep. This sequence and title may have served as a reminder to children in the audience it was all simply a dramatic story.

== Cast ==
- Shep the Dog as himself
- Helen Badgley as Baby Helen
- Arthur Bauer as Helen's father
- Ethyle Cooke Benham as Helen's mother
- Fannie Bourke as a visitor

== Production ==
Child actress Helen Badgley, also known as The Thanhouser Kidlet, is described by the Thanhouser Company who made the film as a "precocious child actress who was very comfortable and expressive in front of the camera". Shep the Dog, also known as The Thanhouser Collie, was a well-trained animal performer who appeared in a number of the company's films during this period. The dog's acting, in portraying a range of emotions including "depression", "groveling pathos" and "joy", was noted to be superior to the child's performance. Shep was owned by the film's director Jack Harvey, but Shep had prior experience working for Vitagraph under Arthur Ashley. While at Vitagraph, Shep received very little coverage and recognition in comparison to Jean, the "Vitagraph Dog". Evidence suggests that Shep starred in Shep, the Hero. (Note: Evidence for this comes from the close working relationship Thanhouser and Majestic and the appearance of a surviving film still.) Jack Harvey believed Shep to be almost human, he would direct Shep entirely by voice and would speak to him with "man talk" instead of simple commands. At an unknown, but presumably later date, Shep's mate of four years, Bessie, became ill and Harvey saw it take a terrible emotional toll on Shep. When Bessie died, Harvey stated it would cause Shep to die of a broken-heart. While A Dog's Love was released little more than a month before Shep's death in early November 1914, two more films had yet to be released. Both The Barrier of Flames and Shep, the Sentinel would be released posthumously.

Official musical accompaniment for works of this period were very rare and only one studio, Vitagraph, regularly made suggestions available to exhibitors. Thanhouser's musical scores were an exception in 1914, but the scores would only be created for the "Thanhouser Big Productions" such as Joseph in the Land of Egypt. (Note: The Lincoln Star referred to the film as a "big Thanhouser production", but this is not defined by Thanhouser's marketing as a "Thanhouser Big Production" which would have the original score.) In 1913 and 1914, cue sheets or musical suggestions could be obtained inexpensively through various industry sources and retained their dominance. Given that these cue sheets were prepared without any specific film in mind, the music would be chosen to match the themes of the film. The film was shot on one reel by the Thanhouser Company, 1,007 feet (307 m) in total. It was shot in standard 35mm and a spherical 1.37:1 format. It was distributed by the Mutual Film Corporation upon release.

== Release and reception ==
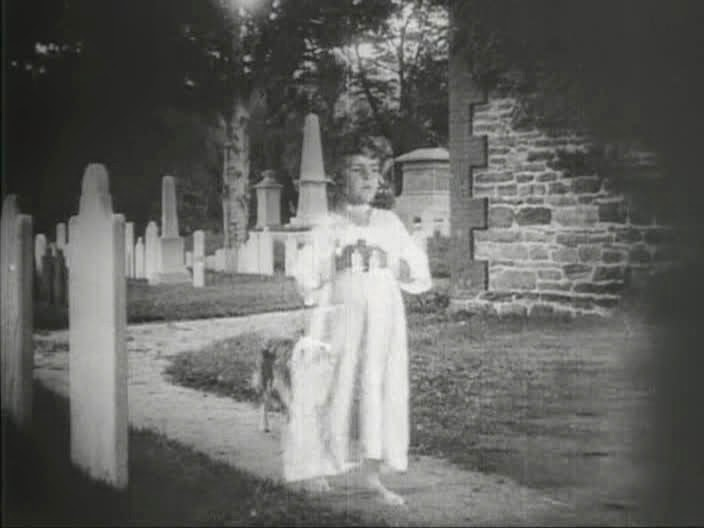
Shep the Dog following the ghost of the girl through the graveyard

The film was well received by film critics and even the passing mentions in The Moving Picture World remarked that it was a good offering with good photography. Jack Harvey's debut film as a director was well received by the public due to its "universally appealing" theme. Thanhouser writes that the "loyal dog's attachment to his little girl playmate is treated with pictorial beauty and simple, honest sentiment", and notes that when it was released on October 4, 1914, reviewers praised the "double-exposure passages for their dramatic effectiveness". Louis Reeves Harrison of The Moving Picture World' review of the film stated, "This play becomes one of delicate pathos toward the end through some remarkable feats of double exposure, and it is one of beauty throughout because of the acting of a four-year-old tot, Baby Helen, a veritable star in her class. Shep contributes with exceptional intelligence - he is not eternally looking at his master out of scope for a word of command. ... I do not know what director handled this subject, but I suggest he apply his thought visualizations to the human characters of future stories. It is the exhibition of what passes in the minds and hearts of characters that brings an audience into closer sympathy with them and makes tense interest possible when melodrama merely brings a laugh. The double exposures are timed with such skill in this instance that all concerned in their production deserve high praise. They give beauty and dignity to a very simple story."

Kitty Kelly of the Chicago Tribune wrote, "Two more attractive artists never collaborated in a single production than this star baby and this star dog. Of them it is impossible to say which is the more so, though one demonstrates the maximum of naturalness while the other is an exponent of the maximum of training. ... As a general thing, I disapprove of the agonies of film mortality and its frequent projection of cemetery scenes, but this is one of the situations that must be handed the label 'exception'. ... The picture is a miniature masterpiece." Contained within her review Kelly, also mentioned that baby Helen was placed in front of the camera so that even as she lay "dying" that she was still shown to be breathing. Kelly stated that no person would wish for a person to stop breathing for the sake of the film, but noted that it was not the best point of vision, but noted that the scene was well-managed. In Britain, The Bioscope reviewer agreed with other reviewers in finding the film to be, "...a perfectly delightful little film. Although it is true that its plot, what there is of it, contains nothing very new, it is not merely a conventional dog and child picture of the ordinary type. It is, rather, an exquisite pictorial fancy, charmingly conceived for the most part and charmingly executed throughout. ... The picture is perfectly done, and not even in the ghost scenes toward the end is there anything banal or insincere in it. A film so full of tender sentiments and natural beauty should meet with the warmest of welcomes everywhere."

Today, copies of the film are in the Museum of Modern Art of New York City and the National Film, Television and Sound Archive of Ottawa film archives. The film was released in Thanhouser Classics Volume II: Under the Mutual Banner 1912-1914. For the release, Andrew Crow composed and performed an original music score.
