= Virginia Tyler Hudson =

American journalist

- Born: January 7, 1886; Gratz, Kentucky, USA
- Occupation(s): Screenwriter, journalist

Virginia Tyler Hudson (later known as Virginia Hudson Brightman; born January 7, 1886, in Gratz, Kentucky), was a prominent female journalist and screenwriter behind the scenes in the media industry in the early 20th century. Hudson had a long history throughout her life of writing for both print and film companies.

== Personal life ==
Raised in Kentucky, Hudson was the daughter of a well-known reverend and had two sisters named Blanche and Juanita. In her youth, she attended Millersburg Female College in Kentucky. Hudson attended Wesleyan College in Georgia upon graduating high school. After graduation, Hudson accepted a position writing for the Louisville Courier-Journal, a local paper that covered Kentucky and Indiana. Hudson was engaged to Indian Merchant Anand A. Advani, but the engagement fell apart. She later married Grant L. Brightman.

== Career ==
During her time working at The Courier-Journal, she often was recognized for her notable work. It was working here that Hudson met Colonel Henry Watterson, who at the time was the chief editor. He served as her mentor, and eventually advised that she move to Chicago permanently because there would be more opportunity for her to grow professionally in the city. Watterson recognized that Hudson had talent, and Hudson took his advice and made the move to Chicago.

During this time, it is unclear exactly when Hudson lived in each of the different cities she wrote for, but she worked for many different publications and periodicals, and at one point she worked as a press agent. Some of the popular papers she frequently wrote for included The Boston Journal, the Chicago Tribune, and The Kansas City Star. She covered high-profile news stories such as one of Franklin D. Roosevelt's campaigns, and also the election of Thomas Woodrow Wilson, the 28th president of the United States, but was not heavily involved in politics. Hudson began to shift her writing from writing news stories to taking a more creative route; she worked on plays, and shortly afterward, moved to writing films.

Hudson then spent time working for the motion picture company Thanhouser, where she developed her skills as a scenario writer. She worked at the company from 1915 to 1916. Her most accounted for films were Inspiration in 1915, and The Cruise of Fate, The Flight of the Duchess, and The Reunion in 1916. Inspiration was most likely Hudson's most recognized work, as it featured female nudity and may have been the first of its kind. After later leaving Thanhouser, she began to work for The World Film Association. Her films with this company included The Burglar (1917) and The Man Hunt (1918) among others.

== Notable events ==
In 1899, an article was published in the local Kentucky paper The Bourbon News about Hudson's supposed engagement to a millionaire merchant from India by the name of Anand A. Advani, who she met while working on a news stories in Chicago. This story drew attention to the small town, because Hudson was a well-known girl, talented in music and with a promising future in the field of music. She became engaged to this man just three days after meeting him. Advani was eventually arrested for a series of crimes, and the engagement broke off. Hudson later married Grant L. Brightman, a man also of the film industry (Variety).

Another of the most heavily cited events of Hudson's life took place in 1918 while working for The World Film Association. Hudson sued the company for supposedly breaching her contract and firing her 19 weeks before the contract expired. She sued for $1,900.00, which was the part of her salary she would have obtained if the contract had been finished. The company appealed the case and said that the contract was written to be broken any time, and that they had not violated Hudson in any way. They argued that she should have known enough to read over the contract and understand the guidelines, as she had already been doing a lot of work for them. She was eventually quoted as saying she was "starving" and needed the money to support herself, so she did not think to make sure the contract was legitimate.

The case ended up going to the Supreme Court multiple times in the year 1919. It went back and forth before a final verdict was reached that said Hudson had been violated, but the amount owed to her was reduced by $300. The story was all over the media as it concerned one of the largest film companies in existence at the time. Hudson's gender, political past, array of experience with many high-profile entertainment companies very likely lead to the exposure and popularity of this case.
