= A Modern Monte Cristo =

Her New York
- Directed by: Eugene Moore
- Written by: Alexandre Dumas (novel); Lloyd Lonergan
- Produced by: Edwin Thanhouser
- Starring: Vincent Serrano; Helen Badgley; Thomas A. Curran
- Cinematography: George Webber
- Production company: Thanhouser Film Corporation
- Distributed by: Pathé Exchange
- Release date: February 4, 1917
- Running time: 50 minutes
- Country: United States
- Languages: Silent; English intertitles

A Modern Monte Cristo (1917)

A Modern Monte Cristo is a 1917 American silent drama film directed by Eugene Moore and starring Vincent Serrano, Helen Badgley and Thomas A. Curran. It is also known by the alternative title of Eye for an Eye.

== Cast ==
- Vincent Serrano as Doctor Emerson
- Helen Badgley as Virginia Deane, age 6
- Thomas A. Curran as William Deane
- Gladys Dore as Virginia Deane, age 18
- Boyd Marshall as Tom Pemberton
- H.M. Rhinehardt as Aviator

== Bibliography ==
- Robert B. Connelly. The Silents: Silent Feature Films, 1910-36, Volume 40, Issue 2. December Press, 1998.
