= Silas Marner (1916 film) =

1916 American silent historical drama film

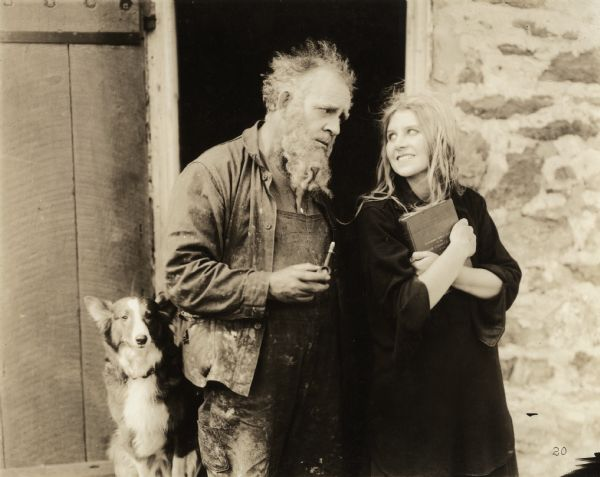
- Film still
- Directed by: Ernest C. Warde
- Written by: Philip Lonergan
- Based on: Silas Marner by George Eliot
- Produced by: Edwin Thanhouser
- Starring: Frederick Warde; Valda Valkyrien; Morgan Jones
- Cinematography: William Zollinger
- Production company: Thanhouser Film Corporation
- Distributed by: Mutual Film
- Release date: February 19, 1916
- Running time: 7 reels
- Country: United States
- Language: Silent (English intertitles)

Silas Marner (1916)

Silas Marner is a 1916 American silent drama film directed by Ernest C. Warde and starring Frederick Warde, Valda Valkyrien, and Morgan Jones. It is an adaptation of the 1861 novel of the same name by George Eliot.

== Cast ==
- Frederick Warde as Silas Marner
- Louise Bates as His sweetheart
- Morgan Jones as His supposed friend
- Thomas A. Curran as Godfrey
- Valda Valkyrien as Molly
- Ethel Jewett as Nancy
- Frank McNish as The Squire Cass
- Hector Dion as Dunstan
- Arthur Rankin as Lammeter

== Production ==
The role of Marner was played by Frederick Warde, who was the father of director Ernest C. Warde. The film was originally planned that the film have a length of 5 reels, but, after filming was complete, it was found to require 7 reels for the story. Studio head Edwin Thanhouser justified this extension to Mutual Film president John R. Freuler under his "natural length theory," saying, "Only a naturally acted play will stand the test and justify the natural length principle. I am satisfied to let this production stand as my ideal illustration of the theory."

== Bibliography ==
- Goble, Alan. The Complete Index to Literary Sources in Film. Walter de Gruyter, 1999. ISBN 1-85739-229-9
