= Louise Emerald Bates =

American actress

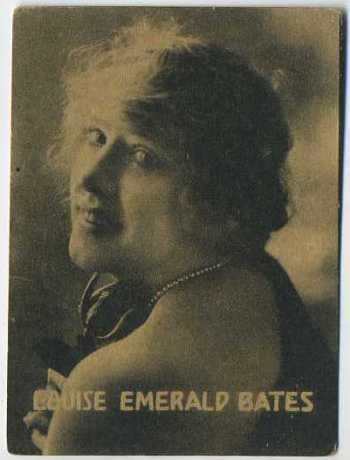
- Bates in 1921
- Born: December 28, 1886; Massachusetts, U.S.
- Died: June 11, 1972 (aged 85); Los Angeles, California, U.S.
- Occupation: Actress

Louise Emerald Bates (December 28, 1886 - June 11, 1972) was an American actress whose photo was covered in the 1915 issue of Motion Picture Classic. Born in Massachusetts, U.S., she left the stage and theater productions, where she starred in musical comedies, for Thanhouser's Falstaff comedies produced at its New Rochelle studio. She was a female lead in Falstaff comedies. In 1916 she worked at Thanhouser's studio in Jacksonville, Florida. where the Falstaff crew relocated. In 1916, actor Harris Gordon was noted as her husband. She married Edmund Mortimer and became Louise Bates Mortimer.

== Theater ==
- The Passing Show
- The Fascinating Widow

== Filmography ==
- Foiling Father's Foes (1915)
- Minnie the Mean Manicurist (1915)
- Conductor's Classy Champion (1915) as Cordelia
- Hilda's Husky Mother (1915) as Hilda
- Film Favorite's Finish (1915)
- Inspiration (1915 film)
- Grace's Gorgeous Gowns (1916)
- The Men She Married (1916) as Ada Semple
- Her Father's Gold (1916) a drama feature film
- Grace's Gorgeous Gowns (1916)
- Pete's Persian Princess (1916)
- Lucky Larry's Lady Love (1916)
- Levy's Fashion Exhibit (1916), private release
- Perkins' Peace Party (1916)
- Silas Marner (1916 film) as His sweetheart
- What Doris Did (1916)
- Maud Muller Modernized (1916)
- Theodore's Terrible Thirst (1916)
- The Weakling (1916)
- The Kiddie's Kaptain Kid (1916)
- Disguisers (1916)
- Advertisemters (1916)
- Real Estaters (1916)
- Guiders (1916)
- Musickers (1916)
- Wrath of Love (1917)
- The Easiest Way (1917) as Elfie St. Clair
- Arms and the Girl (1917) as Olga Karnovitch
- The Marionettes (film) (1918) as Madame de Lancey
- A Wife's Romance (1923) as Isabel de Castellar (credited as Louise Bates Mortimer)
- The Beloved Brat (1938) as Mrs. Morgan's Guest
- Laugh It Off (1939) as Ellen
