= When Love Was Blind (1917 film) =

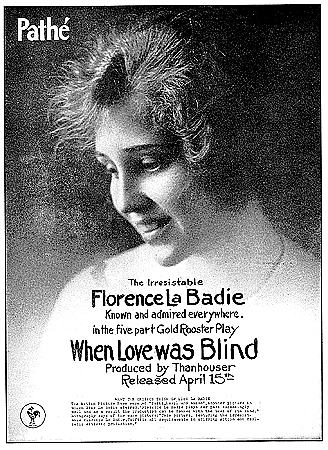
- Directed by: Frederick Sullivan
- Written by: Agnes Christine Johnston
- Produced by: Edwin Thanhouser
- Starring: Florence La Badie; Thomas A. Curran; Boyd Marshall
- Production company: Thanhouser Film Corporation
- Distributed by: Pathé Exchange
- Release date: April 15, 1917
- Country: United States
- Languages: Silent; English intertitles

When Love Was Blind is a 1917 American silent drama film directed by Frederick Sullivan and starring Florence La Badie, Thomas A. Curran and Boyd Marshall. It was shot at studios in Jacksonville, Florida.

== Cast ==
- Florence La Badie as Eleanor Grayson
- Thomas A. Curran as Her Father
- Boyd Marshall as Burton Lester
- Inda Palmer as Undetermined Role
- Harris Gordon as Frank Hargreave
- Gladys Leslie as Vera Hargreave
- Ida Darling as Burton's Aunt
- Helen Badgley
- Grace Henderson
- Henry Leone

== Bibliography ==
- Blair Miller. Almost Hollywood: The Forgotten Story of Jacksonville, Florida. Hamilton Books, 2013.
