= Frederick Warde =

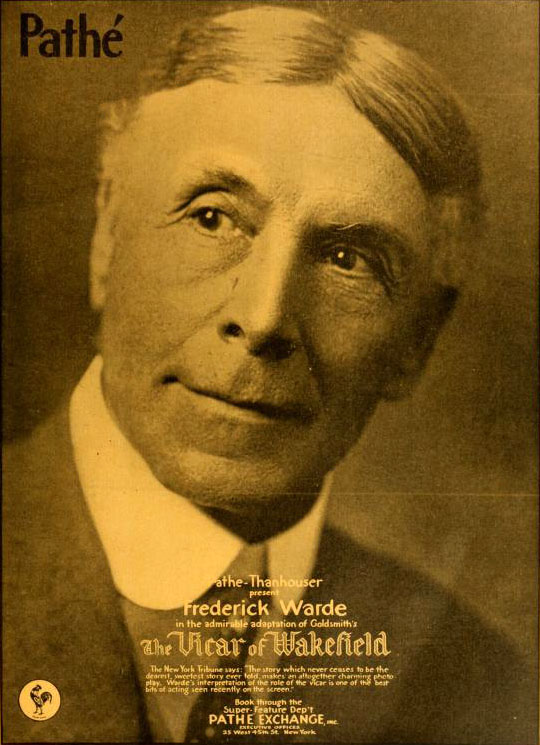
- Warde in The Vicar of Wakefield (1917)
- Born: Frederick Barkham Warde; 23 February 1851; Wardington, Oxfordshire, England, United Kingdom of Great Britain and Ireland
- Died: 7 February 1935 (aged 83); Brooklyn, New York, U.S.
- Occupation: Actor
- Children: Ernest C. Warde

Frederick Barkham Warde (23 February 1851 – 7 February 1935) was an English Shakespearean actor who relocated to the United States in the late 19th century.

== Career ==
He was born in 1851 in Wardington, Oxfordshire, the son of Thomas Ward and Anne (née Barkham). His surname was altered from 'Ward' to 'Warde' for the stage. In the late 1870s he partnered with his friend actor Maurice Barrymore and the two agreed to tour plays around the United States particularly the play Diplomacy. Warde would have one section of the country while Barrymore and his company toured the other. For a time the venture was very successful.

Warde had two notable film achievements, one being the "discovery" of Douglas Fairbanks Sr. and persuading him to move from Denver to join Warde's New York City actors troupe. Fairbanks then made his Broadway debut in 1902.

The second achievement was as the star of Richard III (1912), based on the play by William Shakespeare. This 55-minute film was re-discovered in 1996 by a private film collector who donated it to the American Film Institute archive. The film is thought to be the earliest surviving American feature film. In 1916 Warde filmed another Shakespearean tragedy, King Lear, for the Thanhouser company. This film also exists.

In 1917 he appeared in a Pathe film Under False Colors with an up-and-coming beauty named Jeanne Eagels. Another of his films was A Lover's Oath (filmed in 1921 and premiered four years later), opposite Ramon Novarro, in which he portrayed Omar Khayyám. It is regarded as a lost film.

Warde also recorded an early sound film Frederick Warde Reads Poem, A Sunset Reverie (1921) which was made using the short-lived sound-on-disc Phono-Kinema process. Though Warde lived until 1935 he saw no need to come out of retirement to appear in legitimate sound motion pictures.

== Filmography ==
- Richard III (1912) – Richard, Duke of Gloucester, afterward Richard III
- Silas Marner (1916) – Silas Marner
- King Lear (1916) – King Lear
- The Vicar of Wakefield (1917) – Vicar of Wakefield
- Hinton's Double (1917) – Joshua Stevens / John Evart Hinton
- The Fires of Youth (1917) – Iron Hearted Pemberton
- Under False Colors (1917) – John Colton
- The Heart of Ezra Greer (1917) – Ezra Greer
- Rich Man, Poor Man (1918) – John K. Beeston
- The Unveiling Hand (1919) – Judge Ellis
- Frederick Warde Reads Poem, A Sunset Reverie (1921, Orlando Kellum experimental talking short) – Himself
- A Lover's Oath (1925; filmed in 1921) – Omar Khayyam (Last appearance)

== Publications ==
- The Fools of Shakespeare: An Interpretation of Their Wit, Wisdom and Personalities, New York: McBridge, Nast & Company, 1913.
- Fifty Years of Make-Believe, New York: The International press syndicate (M.M. Marcy). 1920.
