= Shep the Sentinel =

- Directed by: Jack Harvey
- Starring: Shep the Dog, Reenie Farrington, and Nolan Gane
- Production company: Thanhouser Company
- Release date: January 1, 1915
- Country: United States
- Language: Silent

Shep the Sentinel is a 1915 American short silent drama film, directed by Jack Harvey for the Thanhouser Company. It stars Shep the Dog, Reenie Farrington, and Nolan Gane. It features the last appearance of Shep in a film as it was released after his November 1914 death.
