= Inspiration (1915 film) =

1915 film

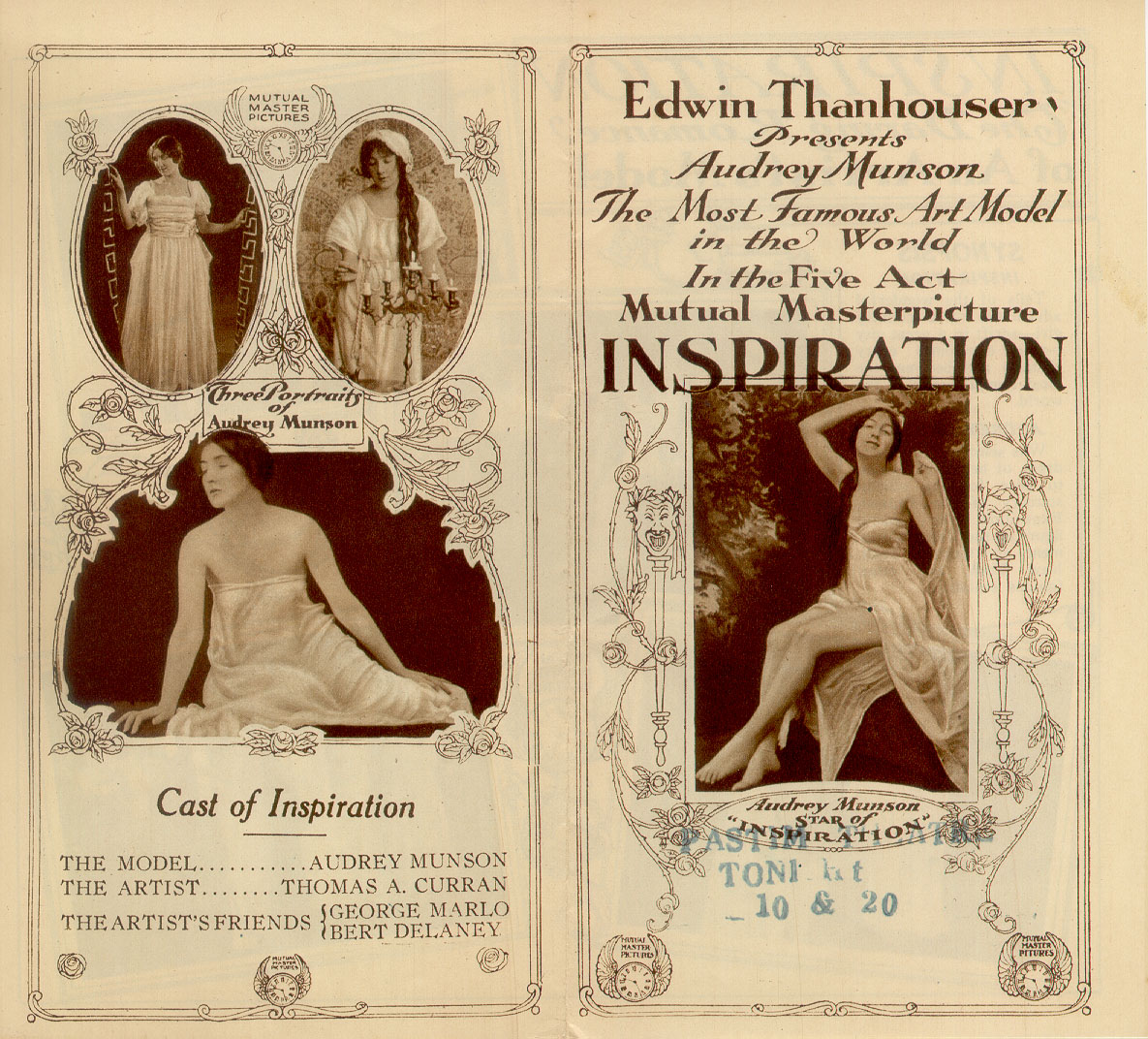
- Promotional brochure
- Directed by: George Foster Platt
- Written by: Virginia Tyler Hudson (scenario)
- Produced by: Edwin Thanhouser
- Starring: Audrey Munson; Thomas A. Curran
- Cinematography: Lawrence E. Williams
- Production company: Thanhouser Film Corporation
- Distributed by: Mutual Film Corporation
- Release date: November 18, 1915
- Running time: 5 reels
- Country: United States
- Language: Silent (English intertitles)

Inspiration is a 1915 American silent drama film directed by George Foster Platt and written by Virginia Tyler Hudson and starring Audrey Munson, an artist's model known at the time for posing for several statues in New York City and the 1915 San Francisco Panama–Pacific International Exposition. It is believed to be one of the first non-pornographic American films to feature full nudity, with Munson frequently appearing naked as a sculptor's model. On its reissue in 1918, the film was renamed as The Perfect Model.

== Plot ==
A sculptor searches for the perfect model to inspire his work. He finally finds his ideal subject: a beautiful but poverty-stricken young woman. When she wanders off, he visits all the famous statues in Manhattan hoping to find her again.

== Cast ==
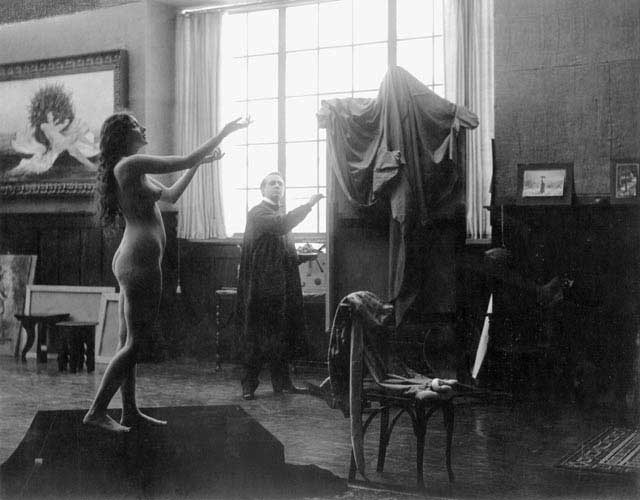
Audrey Munson and Thomas A. Curran in Inspiration

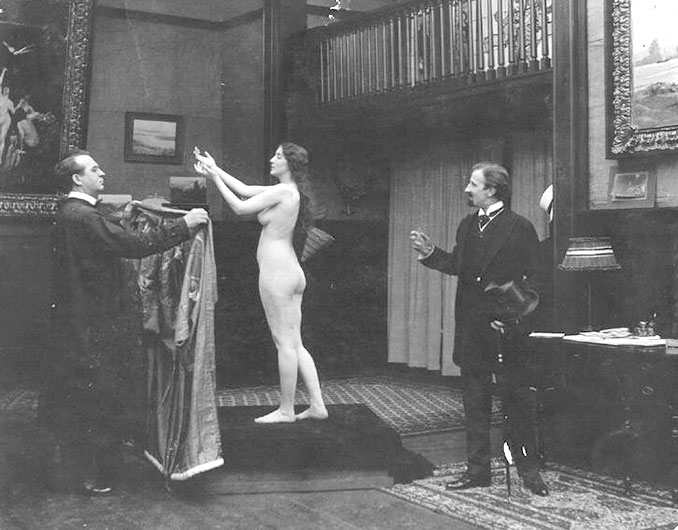
Audrey Munson (center) as The Model, with Thomas A. Curran (left) as The Artist

- Audrey Munson as The Model
- Thomas A. Curran as The Artist
- George Marlo as The Artist's Friend
- Bert Delaney as The Artist's Friend
- Carey L. Hastings
- Ethyle Cooke
- Louise Emerald Bates

== Release ==
For Inspiration, Thanhouser hired a lookalike named Jane Thomas to do Munson's acting scenes, while Munson did the scenes where she posed nude. The film was released on November 18, 1915. Thanhouser's publicity department issued a press statement titled "Inspiration, a Study in Thanhouser Ideals", an interview some newspapers captioned in terms that implied that the studio advocated nudity in motion pictures. Producer Edwin Thanhouser wrote a letter to the editor of The Morning Telegraph to correct that impression: "I wish to state that our five-reel Mutual Masterpiece Inspiration was viewed and passed on by the National Board of Censorship without a single alteration."

Issuing a pass on Inspiration resulted in changes to the Board. Although the Board had passed the film without any recommended cuts, members criticized the decision, charging the Board with laxness in that Inspiration had been approved too readily. At a meeting on February 24, 1916, the Board announced that, in the future, films with nudity would "receive the most critical consideration" and passed only if the nudity was "an essential element of a drama the nature of which warrants such presentation."

== Reception ==
The Morning Telegraph, which reported Munson's credentials as one of the most famous artist's models in the United States, wrote that "Inspiration presents a decided novelty, for it is the first moving picture in which the nude figure of a woman has been used for artistic reasons only". The newspaper's reviewer then addressed more directly the controversial elements of the film:

Miss Munson's classic beauty and her remarkable poise absolutely remove every suggestion of the objectionable ... George Foster Platt, who directed the picture, has used the utmost delicacy producing the picture, and it would have to be a very prudish person who could find any serious objection to the film. The story is too insignificant to sustain the interest for five reels, but the many beautiful poses of Miss Munson will do more than make up for the lack of a good plot. The picture will attract more than usual interest and the delicate and attractive way that a difficult subject has been filmed will no doubt receive the praise it deserves.

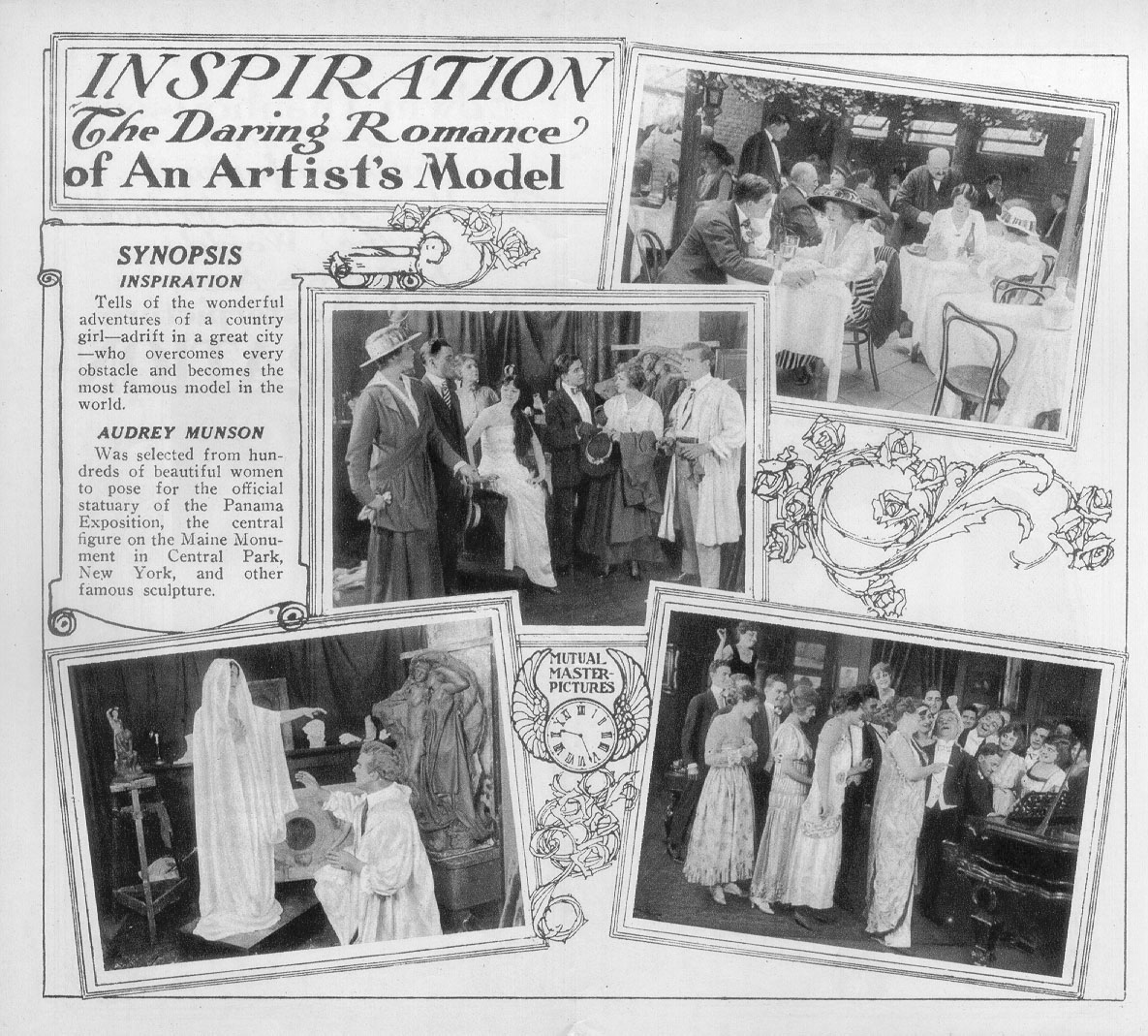
Interior of the promotional brochure

Likewise, a reviewer for The Moving Picture World regarded the story as "slight and conventional", while another credited the film for "presenting a conventional but reasonably diverting story. ... Moreover, it may be noted in favor of Inspiration that it possesses an artistic, and at times, even an educational value. Good taste has been displayed in the handling of scenes that might easily become coarse."

Critics praised the third reel of the film, which details the difficult process of molding Munson's body in plaster for the casting of a sculpture.

Variety wrote: "At last true art has stepped into the motion field and it is all due to Audrey Munson, the Panama-Pacific model who has gained much fame about of late owing to her shapely figure". The New York-based trade paper then provided its overall assessment of the film's content:

There is a bit of a story. It is trivial, however. It is about an artist unable to get a satisfactory model. His friends find a country girl who never posed before. She needs the money. She is capable from the minute she starts and immediately wins fame for the sculptor. There is a bit of love mixed in with the model and artist being joined at the altar. After all the posing that girl did that boy took no chance whatever when he married her, for there was nothing hidden from him. It is one nude pose after another. Miss Munson is always the central and bare figure. The picture has an educational trend as well as being artful. This will make some dizzy, but bookers should get busy. It's a cuckoo.

== Preservation ==
No copies of Inspiration are listed in any film archives, suggesting that it is a lost film.

== See also ==
- Nudity in film
- List of lost films
