= Shep (dog actor) =

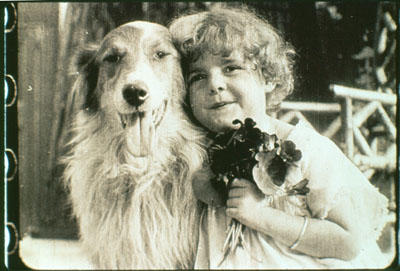
- Shep with Helen Badgley
- Species: Canine
- Breed: Collie
- Sex: Male
- Nationality: American
- Occupation: Actor
- Employer: Thanhouser Company
- Years active: 1913–1914

Shep, or The Thanhouser Dog or Shep the Dog (died November 1914), was a male collie dog who starred in a number of silent films made by the Thanhouser Company.

== Life ==
Shep was a collie owned by Jack Harvey, a film director. When Harvey was working for Vitagraph Studios, Shep appeared in a number of films, but was not given much publicity. In September 1914 Motion Picture Magazine said that Shep was owned by Arthur Ashley while he was with Vitagraph. In A Dog's Love, an 11-minute short released in October 1914, Shep plays a dog who grieves after his human playmate (Helen Badgley) has died. Other successful films in which Shep appeared were Shep's Race with Death and A Dog's Good Deed.

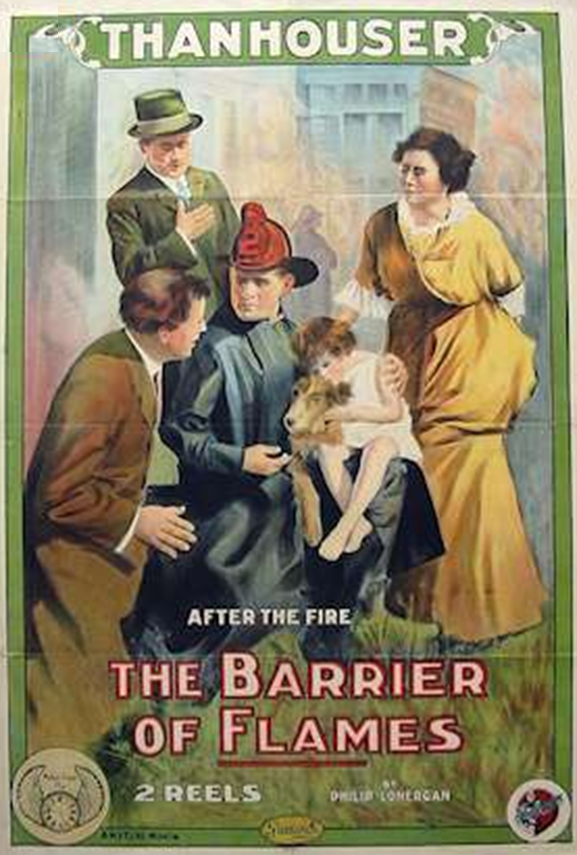
Shep (center) with Helen Badgley on the poster for The Barrier of Flames (1914)

In November 1914 Reel Life said, "In The Barrier of Flames, a forthcoming Thanhouser release, Shep, the beautiful collie, who daily reports for work at the New Rochelle studio, performed another daring rescue, distinguishing himself by a feat of human heroism and sagacity by climbing a ladder and rescuing Helen Badgley from the top story of a burning house." The same month, The Moving Picture World wrote "Shep, Thanhouser's collie, has recently been acclaimed by critics as a great dog actor. His work in motion pictures is a study in itself. The dog rehearses his parts and goes through them just like a regular actor and never grumbles or tries to sass back."

In a feature on Shep, The Chicago News of 23 December 1914 said:

Shep is the name of a dog whose principal claim to fame is that he graces the screen in the capacity of a star, frequently appearing in the title roles of startling and melodramatic 'thrillers.' Shep is a Thanhouser collie, a valuable acquisition to that studio, and, according to the directors, goes about his work with a determination and precision which would do credit to many of his human friends in the profession. Like any ordinary star or stock performer, Shep must rehearse his parts until he attains a perfect understanding of his role. When a scene is ready to be enacted for the camera the canine takes his place among the players, watches them closely as they go through their respective parts and when his cue comes enters the scene without any delay, performing his duties intelligently, rarely spoiling the picture, thereby causing a take-over.

Shep died after a short illness in November 1914. The New York Star reported the death, and said, "There was much sorrow expressed last week at the death of Shep, the Thanhouser dog, who had created a unique part for himself in moving picture work. For Shep was a dramatic actor and could register sorrow or joy with the ease of a great artist. He was known to thousands for his work upon the screen, and though he had many imitators few were even in his class."

== Filmography ==
- With the Assistance of 'Shep' (1913 short)
- Shep, the Hero (1913 short) as Shep
- Faithful Shep (1913 short) as Shep
- Their Mutual Friend (1913 short) as Dick
- Heartbroken Shep (1913 short) as Shep
- Good Pals (1914 short) as Shep
- Love's Old Dream (1914 short)
- Sonny Jim at the North Pole (1914 short) as Shep
- The Violin of M'sieur (1914 short) as Napoleon the dog
- The Million Dollar Mystery (1914 film serial)
- The Little Captain (1914 short) as Shep
- A Dog's Good Deed (1914 short) as Shep
- A Dog's Love (1914 short) as Shep
- Shep's Race with Death (1914 short) as Shep
- The Barrier of Flames (1914 short) as Shep
- Shep the Sentinel (1915 short) as Shep (posthumously released)
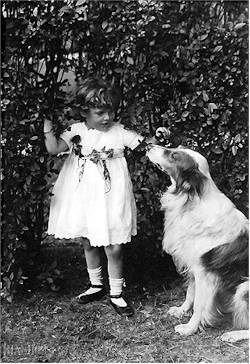
Scene from A Dog's Love

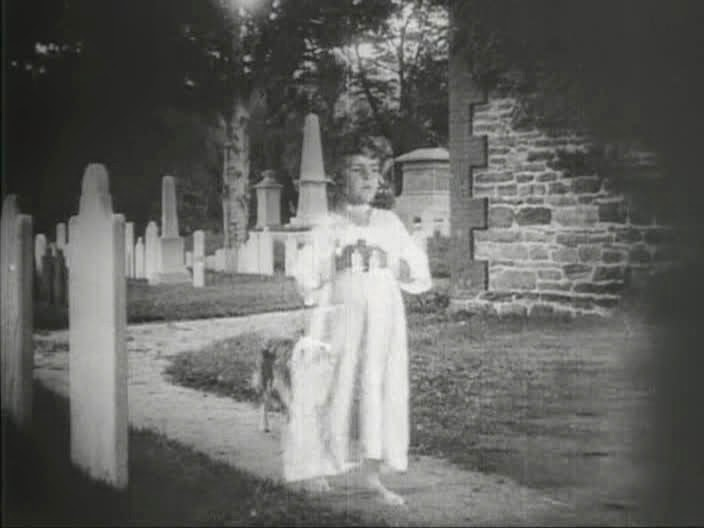
Shep follows the ghost of the little girl in A Dog's Love

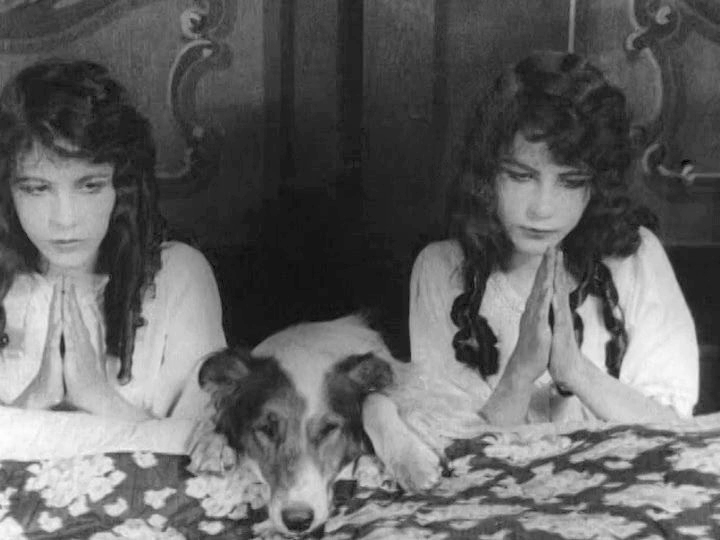
Still from Shep's Race with Death

== See also ==
- List of individual dogs
