= The Stolen Jewels (1915 film) =

- Directed by: Jack Harvey
- Starring: Harris Gordon; Morgan Jones; Carey L. Hastings
- Production company: Thanhouser Company
- Release date: March 21, 1915
- Country: United States
- Language: Silent

The Stolen Jewels is a 1915 American short silent drama film, directed by Jack Harvey for the Thanhouser Company. It stars Harris Gordon, Morgan Jones, Carey L. Hastings.

== Plot ==
William Jameson hires a detective named Bryce to look into a series of strange robberies at one of his stores. Guy Manse the store manager points suspicion toward Jack Kent a young clerk whose job includes opening and closing the safe. With Manse's assistance the detective traps Kent and gathers evidence that appears to prove his guilt. Kent is arrested and sent to jail.

Only his sweetheart - Mary Ball - believes in his innocence. She is also aware that Manse desires her and begins to watch him carefully. One day she sees him accidentally drop a pawn ticket. She quickly memorizes the name and number on it before Manse retrieves it unaware that he has revealed the truth.

Using the information Mary tracks down the stolen jewels and directs the detective to the real culprit. Kent is cleared of all charges and released while Manse is exposed and punished for the crimes.

== Characters ==
- Harris Gordon as Jack Kent
- Morgan Jones as Detective Bryce
- Carey L. Hastings as Mrs. Ball
