= Helen Badgley =

American actress

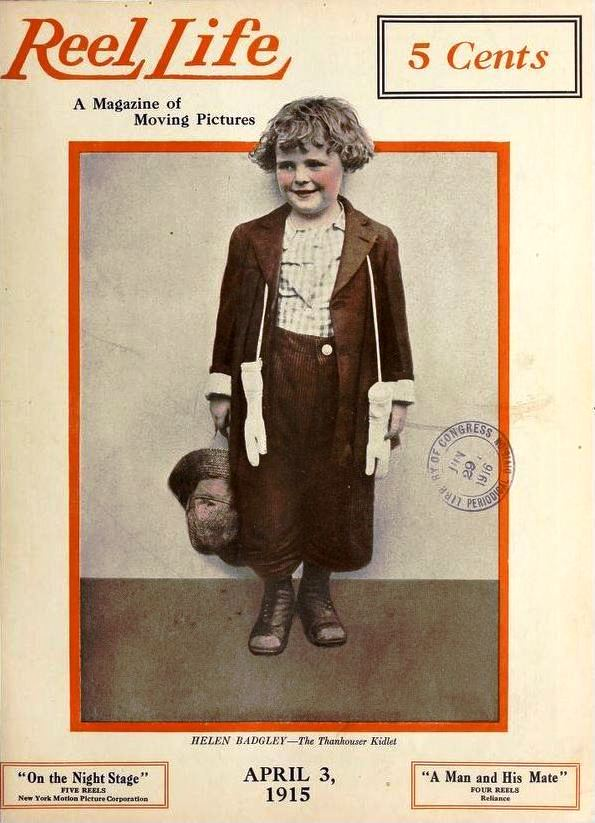
- Born: December 1, 1908; Saratoga Springs, New York
- Died: October 25, 1977 (aged 68); Phoenix, Arizona, U.S.
- Other names: Helen Badgely; The Thanhouser Kidlet
- Occupation: Actress
- Years active: 1911–1917

Helen Badgley (December 1, 1908 – October 25, 1977) was an American child actress of the silent film era.

== Biography ==
Badgley was born in Saratoga Springs, New York. At three years of age she appeared in her first film, Brother Bob's Baby, in 1911. In 1912 she appeared in eleven films, and in 1913, that number increased to twenty two. At age six she lost her two front teeth and retired until new ones could appear. She never went back. She ended up with 103 credits to her name earning her the title "Thanhouser Kidlet" after the movie studio Thanhouser located in New York City which burned down.

She married Robert J. Coar, founder of US Capitol Recording studio serving the Senate and House of Representatives in Washington DC who recorded the "Fireside Chats" with FDR during World War II. They raised four children in Fairfax, VA: Bob, Helen, Gail and Jacquie. Struck with Rheumatoid arthritis, Helen and her four teenagers moved to Phoenix, AZ. She and Robert divorced after he retired from the Capitol after Robert said he "wanted someone healthy". Helen remained in a wheel chair in the later years of her life. She died on October 25, 1977.

== Selected filmography ==
- Baby Hands (1912)
- A Dog's Love (1914)
- The Fires of Youth (1917)
- The Candy Girl (1917)
- A Modern Monte Cristo (1917)
- When Love Was Blind (1917)

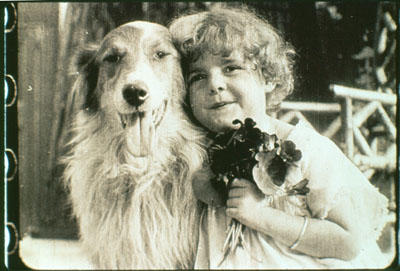
Helen and Shep, the Thanhouser Collie – Thanhouser publicity still
