= Boyd Marshall =

American actor

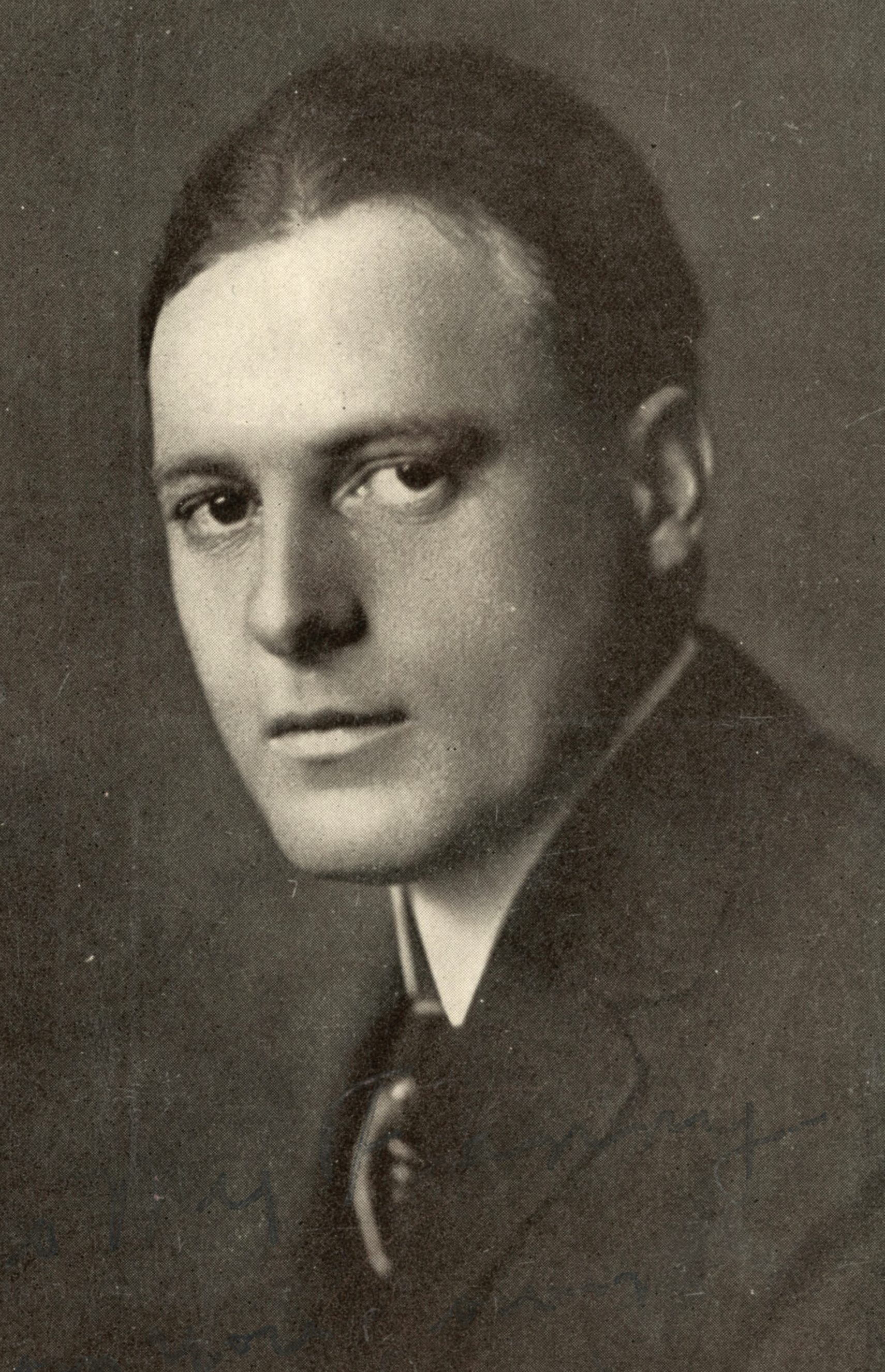
- Marshall in 1914
- Born: June 22, 1884; Port Clinton, Ohio, United States
- Died: November 10, 1950 (aged 66); Queens, New York, United States
- Occupation: Actor
- Years active: 1905–30
- Spouse: Mitzi Hajos (m. 1920)

Boyd Marshall (June 22, 1884 – November 10, 1950) was an American actor of the stage and screen during the early decades of the 20th century. Born in Ohio in 1884, he moved to New York to pursue a career in acting. He began on the stage and in vaudeville, before entering the film industry in 1913. He had a brief film career, lasting until 1917, before he returned to the stage.

== Early life ==
The son of Thomas J. and Agnes Marshall, Boyd Marshall was born on June 22, 1884, in Port Clinton, Ohio. His father was an attorney, but after his father's death in 1895 his mother moved to their large fruit farm in Nina community in Carroll Township, Ottawa County, Ohio west of Port Clinton. It was there where he spent his teenage years. He attended the University of Michigan before deciding to become as a performer. Initially, Marshall wanted a career in opera, and studied at both the University of Michigan School of Music and the Detroit Conservatory Of Music.

== Career ==
In 1905 Marshall appeared in the play Fantana, a musical at the Lyric Theatre in New York, which starred Douglas Fairbanks. In 1908 and 1909 Marshall appeared in Jesse Lasky's production of A Night on a Houseboat at the Orpheum Theater in Allentown, Pennsylvania. The show also toured other venues. In 1909, Marshall joined the Kolb and Dill company on the west coast, performing at the Majestic Theater in Los Angeles, as well as in San Francisco at the Princess Theater. Other early credits for Marshall included leads in the comic opera Mlle. Modiste, written by Victor Herbert, as well as the musical, The Lady from Lane's. He was also a favorite at the New York Hippodrome.

In 1910, Marshall appeared in the musical, The Cash Girl. Also in 1910 Marshall, along with Katharine Bell, toured in the vaudeville production The Wall Between, appearing at such locations as the Orpheum in Allentown, Pennsylvania, as well as the Grand Theater in Pittsburgh, Pennsylvania. That same year he would again star with Bell in a vaudeville piece titled Art. In 1911 and 1912 Marshall toured the country with a group of performers around the vaudeville circuit, in an act titled The Pianophiend Minstral Co. A Jesse Lasky production, the group performed throughout the United States at such venues as the Academy of Music in Washington, D.C., and the Orpheum Theater in Oakland, California. The Pianophiends were selected to perform at a gala honoring William Randolph Hearst in San Francisco in August 1911. In February 1913, Marshall was seen at the Hippodrome in New York in Gypsy Life. In 1913, Marshall starred in the comedy, A Shotgun Cupid, in which he toured with Muriel Ostriche. He also toured with Ostriche in The Little Church Around the Corner.

In 1913 Marshall signed with the Thanhouser Company, one of the first film studios, where he was billed as the "handsomest man in the movies". He was paired with Muriel Ostriche to star in a number of film shorts. In their first year at Thanhouser, Marshall and Ostriche would star in almost 50 films together. In his brief film career, which lasted only 5 years (1913–1917), he appeared on 100 films, the vast majority of them shorts. Eight of those films would be features, including King Lear and The Vicar of Wakefield. He left Thanhouser, and the film industry, in 1917. His final picture was the feature, When Love Was Blind, which also starred Florence La Badie.

After leaving film, Marshall returned to the stage, which included performances in a string of mostly successful Broadway shows between 1918 and 1930. He would appear in several of those plays with his wife, Mitzi Hajos, the Ziegfeld Follies star, whom he married in 1920. His final Broadway appearance would be in 1930's Sari, which also toured the country after its short Broadway run.

In 1932, he would appear as a co-star alongside Katharine Hepburn in The Bride the Sun Shines On at the Croton River Playhouse, in Harmon-on-Hudson (now Croton-on-Hudson), New York. 1935 saw Marshall featured in a play titled Cross Ruff, by Noel Taylor, which played at the Masque Theater.

== Personal life ==
Marshall met his wife in his first Broadway production after leaving films, Head Over Heels in 1918. The two were married on May 21, 1920, in White Plains, New York. The two remained married until his death on November 10, 1950.

== Filmography ==
(Per AFI database)

- The Mill on the Floss (1915) - Guest
- The Flying Twins (1915) - Marshall
- King Lear (1916) - King of France
- The Hidden Valley (1916) - Divinity Student
- The World and the Woman (1916) - The man
- A Modern Monte Cristo (1917) - Tom Pemberton
- The Vicar of Wakefield (1917) - George Primrose
- When Love Was Blind (1917) - Burton Lester
