= Francis Townsend Underhill =

American architect

- Born: February 25, 1863; Oyster Bay, New York, U.S.
- Died: August 22, 1929 (aged 66)
- Burial place: Santa Barbara Cemetery
- Spouses: Henrietta Graham Meyer, Carmelita Dibblee
- Children: 3

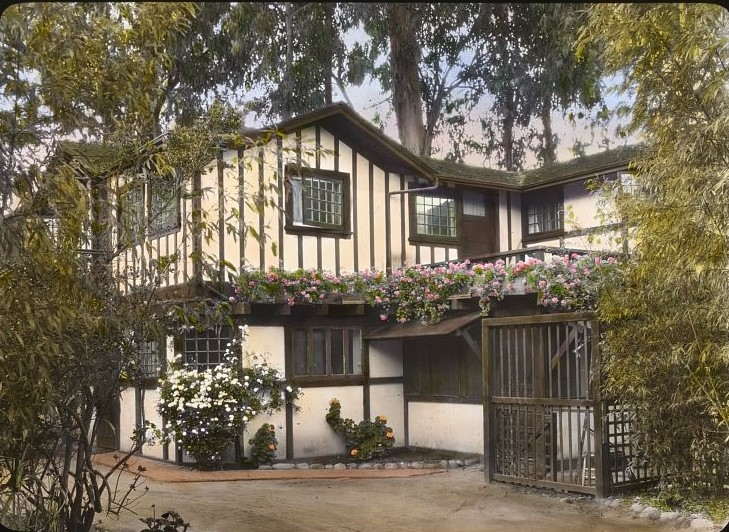
"Inellan," Walter Douglass house, Channel Drive, Montecito, CA, by Frances Benjamin Johnston, 1917. Architect: Francis Townsend Underhill (1902), with changes for Walter Douglass ca. 1906. Landscape: Francis Townsend Underhill, from 1902

Francis Townsend Underhill (25 February 1863 – 1929) was a politician from the U.S. state of New York and an amateur architect in California.

== Biography ==
Born in Oyster Bay, New York, he was a ninth-generation descendant of Captain John Underhill. Underhill was raised by his aunts as his parents (James Week Underhill, 1819–1868; Margaret Varnum) died when he was of a young age. He was educated by tutors in the US and abroad, studying architecture and landscape architecture.

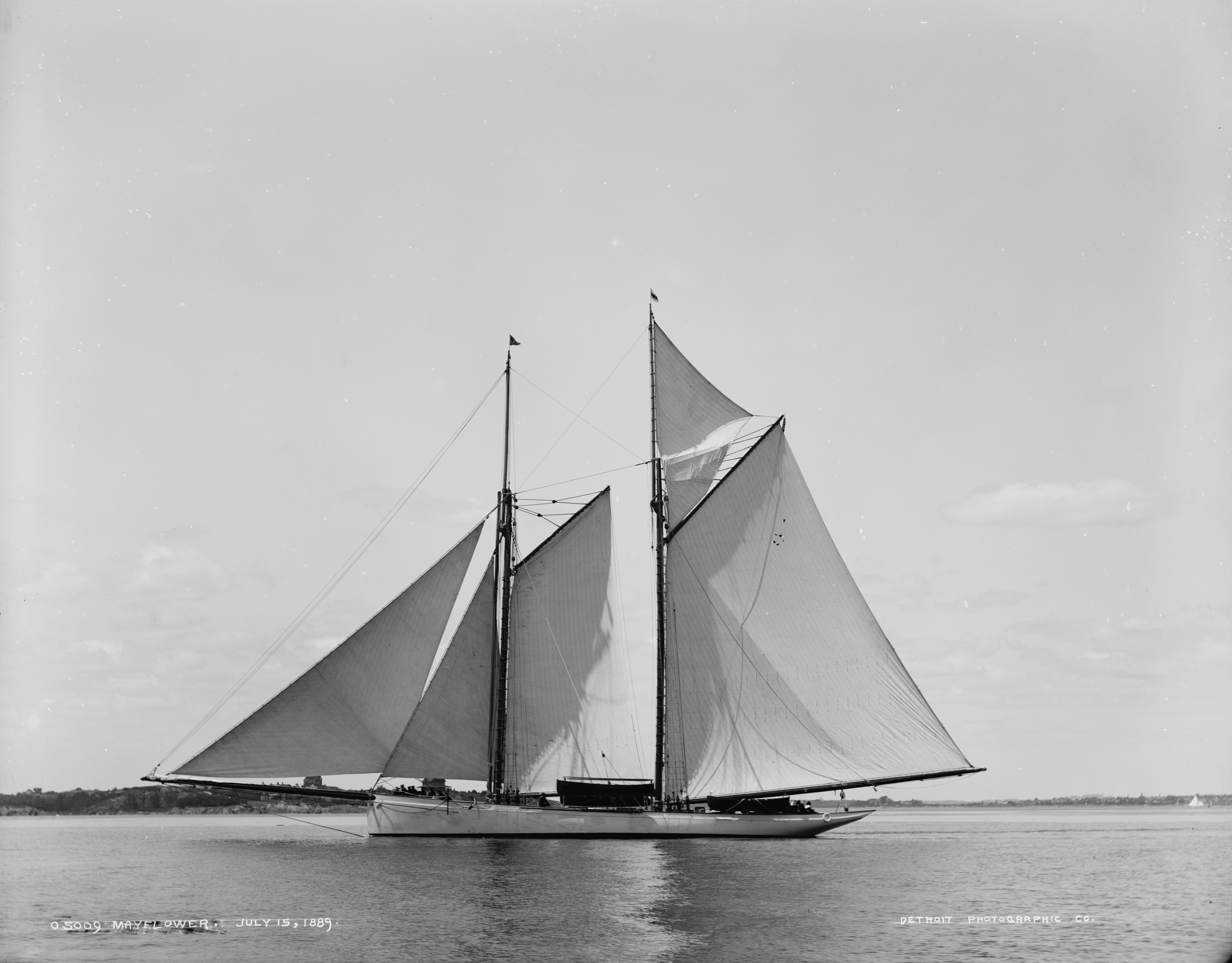
Underhill's Mayflower

Underhill married Henrietta Graham Meyer in 1883. Their three daughters, Margaret Varnum Underhill (born 1885), Katherine Underhill (born 1892), and Dorothy Underhill (born 1894), were raised at the family's Oyster Bay estate. He was a member of Caroline Astor's Four Hundred social registry, the Knickerbocker Union, Society of Colonial Wars, Sons of the American Revolution, and the Union Club of New York. A horseman, he was a judge at Madison Square Garden in 1890. Underhill raced his yachts, Mayflower and Mischief in the America's Cup. He served as an Army officer in Cuba during the Spanish–American War alongside Theodore Roosevelt. He briefly served as secretary to E. H. Harriman of the Union Pacific Railroad.

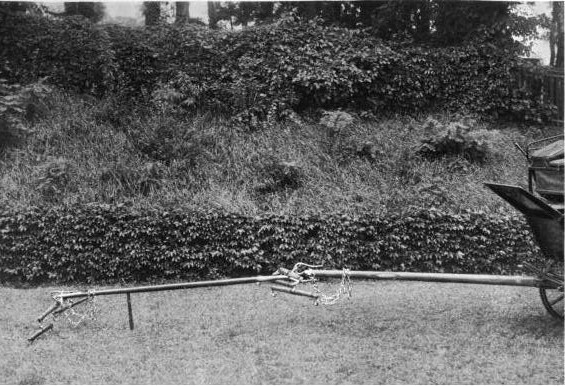
Six horse harness from Driving for Pleasure: Or, The Harness Stable and Its Appointments (1896)

In 1884, Underhill bought the Ontare Ranch in the Santa Ynez Valley from Dixie Thompson for $18,000, moving there with his family. Two years later, he purchased 5,260 acres south of Los Alamos, California from Dr. James Barron Shaw in spring 1886. He wrote Driving for Pleasure: Or, The Harness Stable and Its Appointments in 1896. In 1900, Underhill divorced Henrietta and moved permanently to California, tired of splitting his time between two coasts. He purchased the 6,000 acre El Roblar Rancho near Los Alamos in 1904, and two years later, he married Carmelita Dibblee (born 1886, Santa Barbara), granddaughter of Pablo de la Guerra and great-granddaughter of José de la Guerra y Noriega.

== Architecture ==
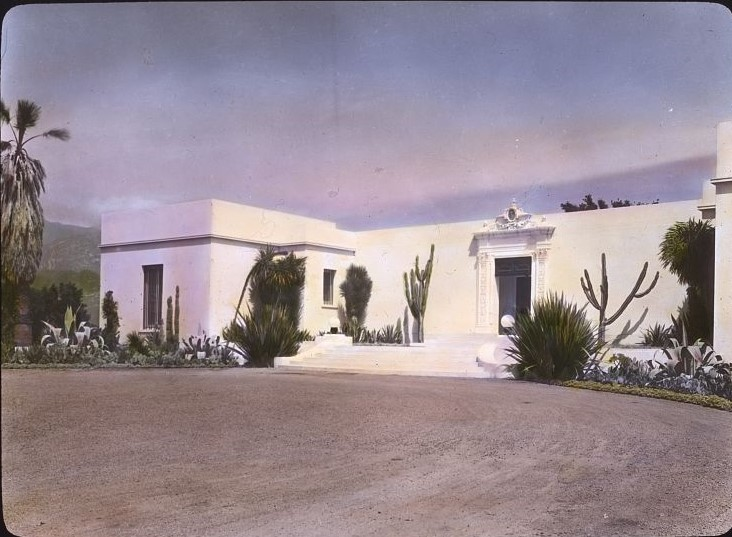
"Solana," Frederick Forrest Peabody house, Eucalyptus Hill Road, Montecito, by Frances Benjamin Johnston, 1917. Architect: Francis Townsend Underhill (1913-1914). Landscape: Charles Frederick Eaton, from 1906

In 1904, Underhill designed for his second wife La Chiquita, which Country Life in America named in 1915 "one of the 12 best country houses in America'. It is now a part of the Santa Barbara Biltmore. Recognized as a talented architect and landscape designer, Underhill was commissioned to design over 32 houses and several gardens over the following ten years, which turned out some of the most enduring buildings in Santa Barbara. His most notable achievements include Villa de la Guerra, the Polo Club, Solana (the Peabody residence which eventually became the Center for the Study of Democratic Institutions), and the Roman Pool Pavilion for the George Owen Knapp's Arcady estate (featuring a 40-foot indoor pool encased in an neoclassic structure with a precisely engineered retractable roof).

The Underhill estate was used in 1916 as filming location for the movie Purity starring noted artists' model Audrey Munson.

- 1903-04, Francis Underhill house #1, La Chiquita, Santa Barbara
- 1904, Francis Underhill house #2, Santa Barbara
- 1906-07, Francis Underhill house #3, Montecito
- 1909-10, Francisca de la Guerra Dibblee house (mother of Carmelita Dibblee), near Mission Santa Barbara
- 1911, Walter Douglas house, Montecito
- 1911, Joseph G. Coleman, Jr. house, Montecito
- 1911-14, Peabody house, Solana, Santa Barbara
- 1914-17, Arcady garden, George Owen Knapp estate
- 1916, Roman Pool Pavilion, George Owen Knapp estate
- 1916-17, George C. Boldt house, La Manzanita, Montecito
- 1917, Robert Patterson house, East Valley Road, Montecito
- 1917, C. F. K. Billings house, Santa Barbara

== Bibliography ==
- Winter, Robert (1997). Toward a Simpler Way of Life: The Arts & Crafts Architects of California. University of California Press. ISBN 978-0-520-20916-9.
