= La Chiquita (Montecito, California) =

Francis Townsend Underhill house in Montecito, California

Coordinates: 34.4175°N 119.6442°W

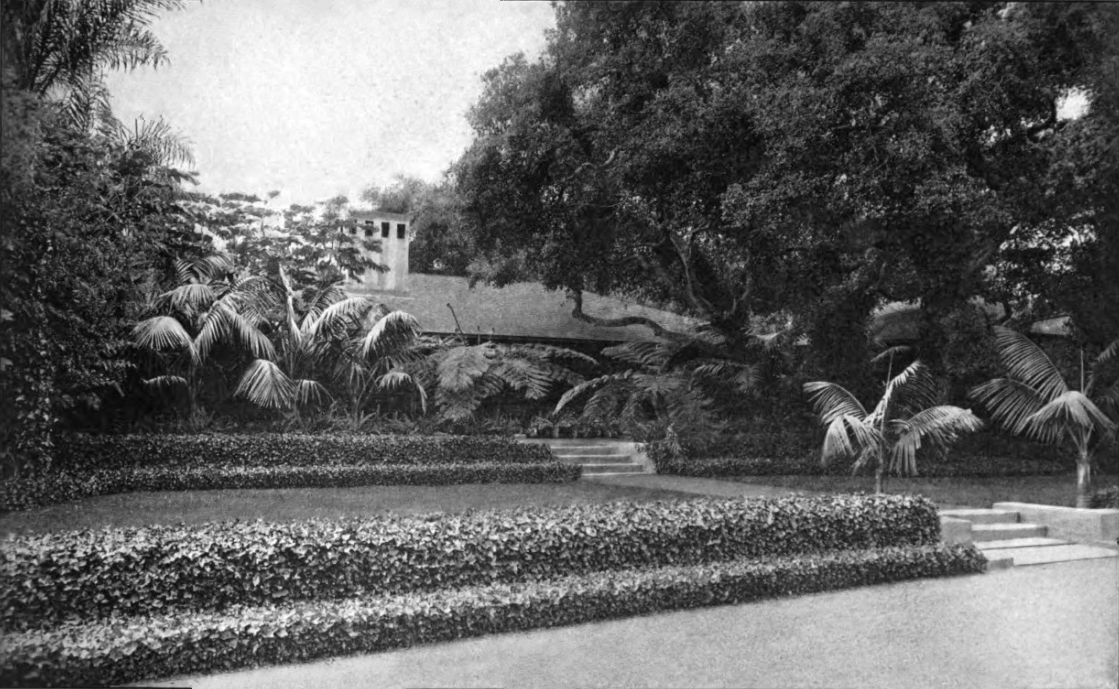
- La Chiquita rear or entrance front
- Interactive map of the La Chiquita area

General information
- Location: Channel Drive, Montecito, California
- Completed: 1904

Technical details
- Floor count: 1

Design and construction
- Architect: Francis Townsend Underhill

La Chiquita is a residential home built in 1904 by Francis Townsend Underhill in Montecito, California, US. In 1915, Country Life in America named it one of the 12 best country houses in America. It is situated close to the Santa Barbara Biltmore.

== Location ==
La Chiquita is located on Channel Drive near the Santa Barbara Biltmore property. It is set amongst oaks on a long, fairly narrow rectangle from the shore drive along the Pacific, back toward the protecting mountain wall. Another driveway, paralleling the shore, cuts a square off the rear end of the long rectangle. The detached rear square naturally offered possibilities as a secluded garden but open upon a central axis which led to the entrance of the house, set well back upon the larger portion of the land.

== Architecture ==
The property never had a floor plan. The house is in the form of a one-story bungalow. Toward the sea, the building presents a long unbroken front, from which the living room and dining room look out upon the great expanse of shaded lawn to the Pacific. On the north side, toward the mountains and the entrance road, a wing turns back at one end, enclosing, in the terrace angle with a long, low-pitched roof. This north side, being not over a couple of hundred feet from the rear roadway, is sheltered and screened. To the south, however, the great oaks are the only growth that breaks the great sweep of lawn between the thickly planted border lines. The dining room features view windows.
