= Editorial =

Journalism genre

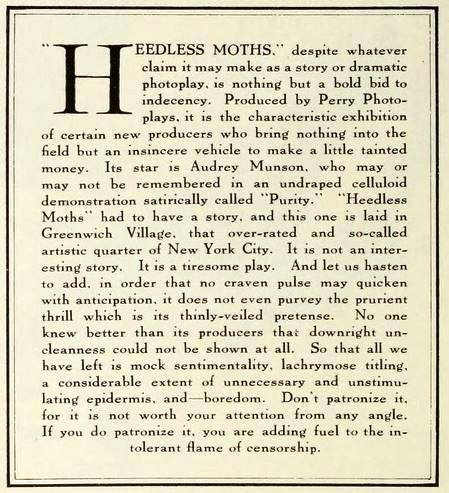
An editorial from a 1921 issue of Photoplay recommending that readers not watch a film, Heedless Moths, which featured nude scenes

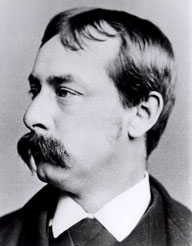
Francis Pharcellus Church, author of the famed 1897 The Sun editorial, which contains the line "Yes, Virginia, there is a Santa Claus"

An editorial, or leading article (UK) or leader (UK), is an article or any other written document, often unsigned, written by the senior editorial people or publisher of a newspaper or magazine, that expresses the publication's opinion about a particular topic or issue. Australian and major United States newspapers, such as The New York Times and The Boston Globe, often classify editorials under the heading "opinion".

== Characteristics ==
An editorial uses arguments, and statements of fact and common sense, in order to advance a certain point of view (e.g. praise, criticism, apologia or advocacy) held by its publication. Editorials generally have an introduction that introduces the argument, a body that expands upon it and a conclusion that proposes a way to address the issue being discussed. An editorial differs from a column, which represents its author's opinion. Because editorials do not express their individual authors' opinions they are often written in the first-person plural we (in which instance the word is known as the editorial "we"), though they are sometimes written in the first-person singular I.

An editorial is typically written by a member of an editorial board (a group that decides the editorial policies of a publication that all its editorial writers must follow) or by a member (in some cases the publication's editor-in-chief) of the publication's general staff. Multiple editorial writers may be on the staff of a large publication. Because an editorial written by someone who does not agree with its message is likely to be rhetorically weak, the editorial writer himself is usually the person who proposes its writing in the first place. A guest editorial may be published in one publication that is written by and expresses the opinions of another.

Many editorials not written by the editor-in-chief lack bylines. Tom Clark, leader-writer for The Guardian, says that it ensures readers discuss the issue at hand rather than the author. Editorials by the editor are usually signed because the head of the newspaper, the editor, is already known by name, and even if the editor did not write the other editorials, he still oversaw their creations and had some influence over their contents.

Editorials are typically published on a dedicated page, called the editorial page, which often features letters to the editor from members of the public; the page opposite this page is called the op-ed page and frequently contains opinion pieces by writers not directly affiliated with the publication. However, a newspaper may choose to publish an editorial on the front page. In the English-language press, this occurs rarely and only on topics considered especially important; it is more common, however, in some European countries such as Denmark, Spain, Italy, and France.

Not all editorials come in textual form. Illustrated ones may appear in the form of editorial cartoons. In the field of fashion publishing, the term is often used to refer to photo-editorials – features with often full-page photographs on a particular theme, designer, model or other single topic, with or (as in a photo-essay) without accompanying text. Opinionated yet analytical television and radio broadcasts by journalists are the equivalent to written editorials.

== Ethics ==
In 1978 the National Conference of Editorial Writers published a code of ethics for editorial journalists in its journal, The Masthead. The code stated that editors and editorial writers ought to avoid:

- presenting information dishonestly or disingenuously
- drawing unreasonable conclusions
- scorning differing opinions
- failing to reassess previous conclusions and inform readers when new information arises
- keeping conflicts of interest secret, or allowing their colleagues to do so
- accepting favours from sources or subjects
- releasing information they had promised to keep confidential and
- publishing other newspapers' editorials as their own without attribution.

== History ==
Prototypes to the modern editorial form could be found in the prefaces of newsbooks and pamphlets in 17th century England, and in American essays and papers by authors such as Thomas Paine, Isaiah Thomas, James Madison, Alexander Hamilton and John Jay (the latter three having collectively written The Federalist Papers) during and after the Revolutionary War (1775–1783). Newspapers, like James Rivington's New York Gazetteer and Benjamin Franklin's Pennsylvania Gazette, of the United States' colonial era did not publish editorials in their own sections but incorporated opinion into their regular news coverage.

The editorial did not become a literary form in and of itself until 1784 as a result of the commercialisation of journalism and an increasing interest in politics in the public following the Revolutionary War. The oldest surviving newspaper editorial was written by Noah Webster for his newspaper American Minerva's first edition, which was published on 9 December 1793; in it Webster predicted that Americans would be more patriotic "than other nations before them" because they now "own[ed] their land and property".

In the 19th century, the Richmond Enquirer started publishing unsigned opinion pieces and thereby created the first instance of a dedicated editorial page in a newspaper. The pronoun "I" was more common in early 19th-century editorials than it is in contemporary times, but, because the newspaper's editor was presumed by readers to be the writer, editorials were almost never signed. Editorials often openly attacked staff of rival newspapers and members of opposing political parties, and intentionally incited the public to riot. The most popular editorials during this period were those published in the New York Sun, The New York Herald and the New York Tribune by Benjamin Henry Day, James Gordon Bennett and Horace Greeley respectively; Greeley caused the editorial to become an established and ubiquitous part of newspapers.

Starting in 1831 William Lloyd Garrison's editorials in his Liberator spread the cause of abolition. After Nat Turner's rebellion, which Southern journalists accused Garrison of having incited, Garrison's editorials were republished out of condemnation in Southern newspapers and thereby further popularised, which "thrust [Garrison] into the editorial leadership of the abolitionist movement". Editorial cartoons began appearing in American newspapers in the mid-19th century. In 1861, Fitz Henry Warren, in Greeley's absence, wrote editorials for the Tribune that, among other causes, led to the First Battle of Bull Run. After the American Civil War ended, editorials were more and more often written not by famous publishers but by regular staff.

The first "editorialised" radio programs were broadcast in the 1920s, but the Federal Communications Commission, in order to prevent stations from swaying the public, prohibited editorialisation in radio from 1941 until it introduced the Fairness Doctrine in 1949. As the audiovisual aspects of television became better in quality in the 1950s, televised news programs started to air "editorial" segments where hosts voiced their opinions. Two notable such hosts were Walter Cronkite and Edward R. Murrow, American journalists who in their segments condemned the Vietnam War and McCarthyism respectively. Because newspapers have declined greatly in readership and profitability in the digital age, it has become increasingly common for print newspapers to lay off their editorial staff and have guest writers create opinion pieces instead.

== Cultural differences ==
Editorial writers from the United States are blunter than Finnish ones, who tend to be more conflict-averse, in stating their main ideas.

== See also ==
- Column (periodical) – Recurring piece or article in a periodical
- Editorial board – Group of experts that dictate a publication's editorial policy
- Op-ed – Type of opinion-expressing written pieces
- Opinion journalism – Type of journalism

== Works cited ==
- Hulteng, John L. (1973). THE OPINION FUNCTION: Editorial and Interpretive Writing for the News Media. Harper & Row, Publishers.
- Ward, William G. (1969). The Student Journalist and THINKING EDITORIALS. Richards Rosen Press, Inc.
- Stonecipher, Harry W. (1979). Editorial and persuasive writing. Opinion functions of the news media. Communication arts books. New York: Hastings House. ISBN 978-0-8038-1953-5.
- Bittner, John R. (1977). Radio journalism. Englewood Cliffs, N.J. : Prentice-Hall. ISBN 978-0-13-750463-3.
- Le, Elisabeth (2010). Editorials and the power of media: interweaving of socio-cultural identities. Discourse approaches to politics, society and culture. Amsterdam ; Philadelphia: John Benjamins Pub. Company. ISBN 978-90-272-0626-8.
- Rystrom, Kenneth (1999). The why, who, and how of the editorial page (3 ed.). State College, Pa: Strata Pub. ISBN 978-1-891136-01-6.
