= The Spirit of Life =

1914 sculpture by Daniel Chester French

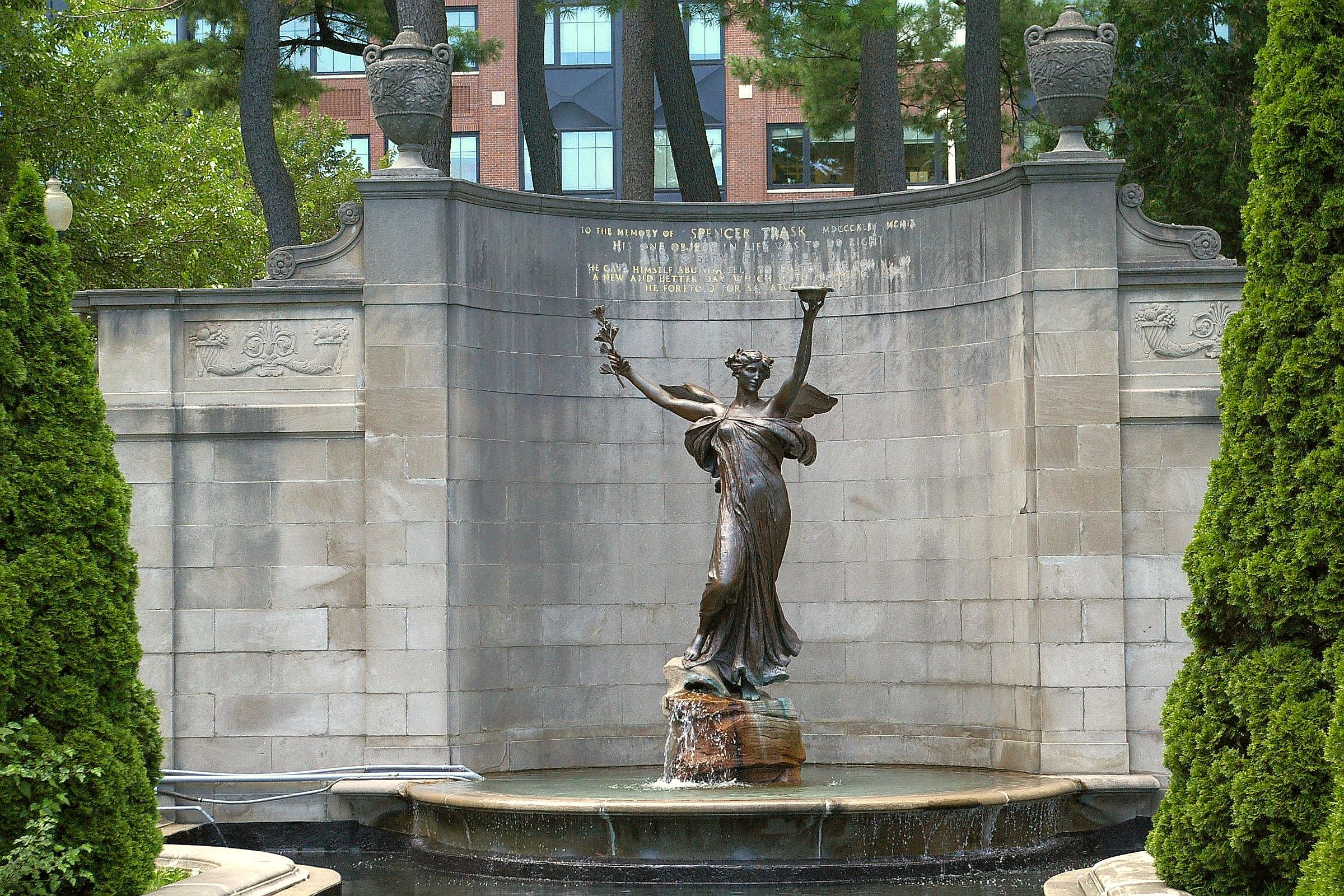
- Artist: Daniel Chester French
- Year: 1914
- Type: Bronze
- Location: Saratoga Springs, NY (smaller castings elsewhere); 43°4′44.5″N 73°47′7.2″W

The Spirit of Life is a 1914 sculpture in Saratoga Springs, New York, by the American sculptor Daniel Chester French.

== Overview ==
The Spirit of Life began as a commission for a memorial to the famous Wall Street financier Spencer Trask (1844–1909). Trask was a summer resident in Saratoga Springs and a founder of the committee which was charged with renewing the city's reputation as a health resort. The commission for the monument came from George Foster Peabody who was a friend of Trask's. Henry Bacon, who collaborated with French on the Lincoln Memorial, designed the setting for French's statue.

The statue stands in the heart of Congress Park on a shallow niche of white marble with a balustraded terrace above and an oblong lagoon, set in marble and surrounded with verdant shrubbery, green lawns and a wealth of flowers below. The statue is a figure of a winged woman, hands moving high above her head (the model has been said to be Audrey Munson but recent Daniel Chester French scholarship shows that Hettie Anderson posed). The figure represents Hygieia, the giver of health, who usually appeared in Greek and Roman art accompanying her father, Asklepios, the god of medicine. She is often shown offering nourishment to a serpent entwined on the staff which Asklepios carries. In French's conception, Hygieia holds aloft a shallow bowl and in the other hand clasps a pine bough, a reference to the towering pines on the grounds of the Trasks' estate. The goddess is poised lightly on a rock and a stream of water pours from its cleft. The pedestal is a sculptured reproduction of the tufaceous deposits seen about the orifice of many of Saratoga's famous springs. The inscription on the statue reads, "To do good and serve my fellow man."

The Spirit of Life is one of French's finest "active" statues. The flow of the angel's robe and the position of her right foot gives a great deal of motion. Several smaller castings of the statue were made and authorized by French; six were made between 1923 and 1931.

It is considered a contributing object to the National Historic Landmark District that includes the park and Canfield Casino.

== See also ==
- Public sculptures by Daniel Chester French
