= The Birth of a Race =

1918 silent film

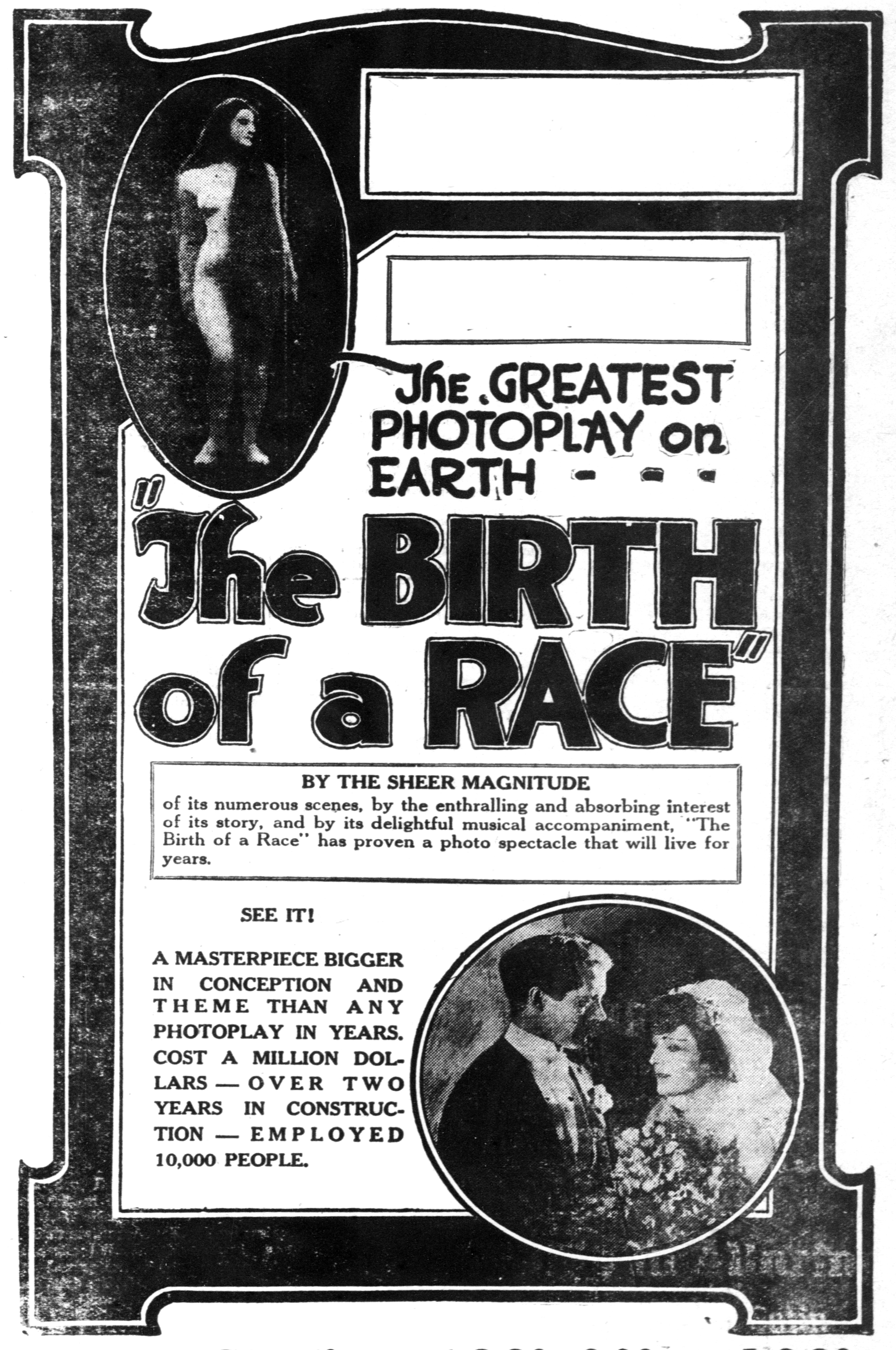
- Newspaper advertisement.
- Directed by: John W. Noble; Rex Weber
- Produced by: Emmett Jay Scott
- Cinematography: Herbert Oswald Carleton
- Music by: Joseph Carl Breil
- Distributed by: Gardiner Syndicate
- Release date: December 1, 1918
- Country: United States
- Language: Silent (English intertitles)

The Birth of a Race

The Birth of a Race is a 1918 American silent drama film directed by John W. Noble. It was made as a response to the 1915 film The Birth of a Nation, and was meant to discredit the negative stereotypes perpetuated by the film. Initially, it was intended to be a short answer film that could be appended to The Birth of a Nation in 1915, but a combination of weak financial backing and growing ambitions delayed its completion for more than two years.

When finally released in December 1918, The Birth of a Race was a two-hour feature-length film nothing like producer Emmett Jay Scott's original vision. A large quantity of footage highlighting the achievements of black people specifically was removed from the final film.

The film premiered in Chicago in December, 1918, to great ballyhoo but was a commercial and critical failure. After two public showings, the film was cut from 2.5 hours to a shorter 60-minute version, which is preserved at the Library of Congress.

== Synopsis ==
The first hour of the movie follows various scenes from the Bible. It begins with brief depictions of Adam and Eve and Noah's ark as told in Genesis. It continues on to the Book of Exodus, showing epic scenes of Ancient Egypt including the rescue of infant Moses in the river, the Exodus of the Israelites, and Moses receiving the Ten Commandments.

Next, a 20-minute Passion play follows the trial, crucifixion, and death of Jesus. Key scenes portray Jesus preaching to crowds of all races and a black Simon of Cyrene helping carry the cross on the Via Dolorosa.

The story then shifts to United States history, briefly showing the arrival of Christopher Columbus in the Americas, the American Revolutionary War, and the assassination of Abraham Lincoln.

It ends in World War I, with two white brothers in a German-American family going to war on the Western Front, one ("George") fighting for the United States, and the other ("Oscar") fighting for Germany. George is wounded, and at the hospital defends it from a German attack, killing Oscar in the process. George is sent home to America, where he rescues his wife from a German spy.

== Cast (in credits order) ==
- Louis Dean as The Kaiser
- Harry Dumont as The Crown Prince
- Carter B. Harkness as Adam
- Doris Doscher as Eve
- Charles Graham as Noah
- Ben Hendricks, Sr. as Fritz Schmidt (credited as Ben Hendricks)
- Alice Gale as Frau Schmidt
- John Reinhardt as Pat O'Brien
- Mary Carr as Mrs. O'Brien (credited as Mary K. Carr)
- Jane Grey as Jane O'Brien
- Edward Elkas as Herr Von H.
- Anna Lehr
- Philip Van Loan
- George LeGuere (credited as George Le Guere)
- Warren Chandler
- Anita Cortez
- Edwin Boring
- Dick Lee
- David Wall
- Belle Seacombe

== Production ==
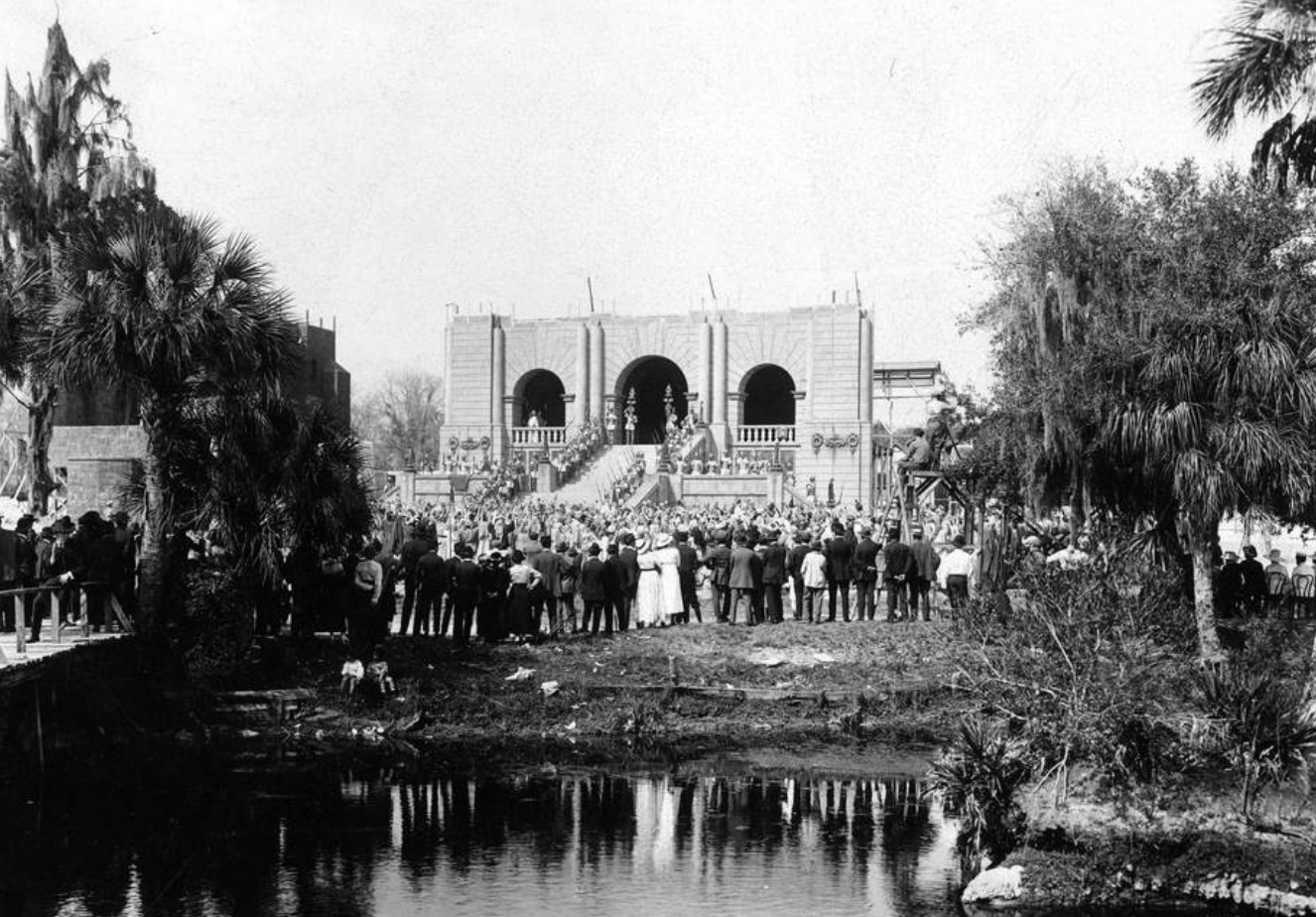
Filming on an Egyptian set in Tampa, 1918

Principal filming took place in Chicago and Tampa, Florida. Several outdoor scenes were filmed in Tampa in January, 1918, including ancient Egypt and the rescue of the infant Moses from a river and Simon of Cyrene helping Jesus carry his cross on the Via Dolorosa.

=== Screenplay ===
The original screenplay purportedly demonstrated black achievements throughout history. A brochure pitching the film to potential investors reads:

The Birth of a Race, the true story of the Negro — his life in Africa, his enslavement, his freedom, his achievements — together with his past, present and future relations with his white neighbor. It will bring close the future in which the races — all races — will see each other as they are.

However, investors pushed to move the film away from themes of race to create a more universal, patriotic film. According to a 1918 Variety article, "A large quantity of film, depicting certain phases of the advancement of the Negro race, was dropped." Only a few of these scenes remained, such as a shot of a black man and a white man working together in a field.

=== Versions ===
The final film was reportedly 2 hours and 30 minutes in length, but after two public showings it was cut to 60 minutes. The 60-minute short version is preserved at the Library of Congress.

== Reception ==
Critics complained that the screenplay was muddled about two white brothers fighting on opposite sides in WWI. Birth of a Race also suffered at the box office due to its release just weeks after the end of World War I; audiences were no longer interested in seeing a war film.

== See also ==
- List of American films of 1918
- Race movie
