= Purity (film) =

1916 film directed by Rae Berger

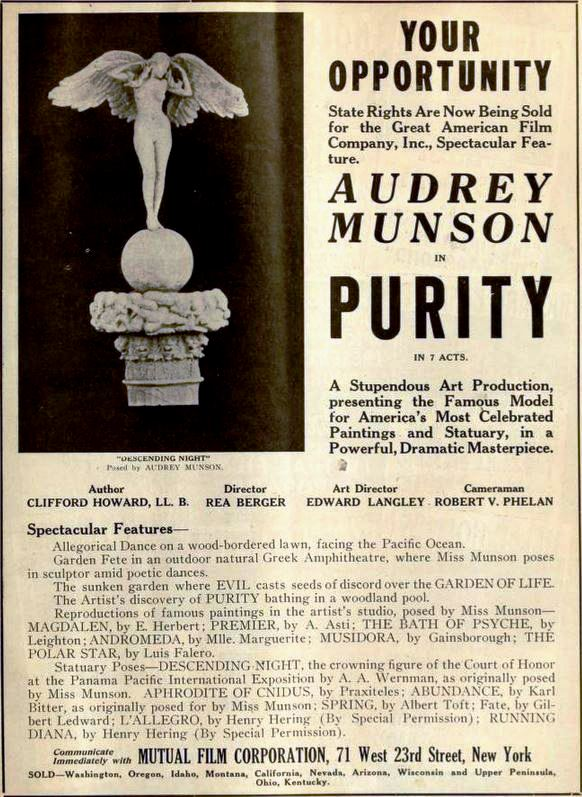
- Promotion in Moving Picture World, 1916
- Directed by: Rae Berger
- Written by: Clifford Howard (scenario)
- Starring: Audrey Munson
- Cinematography: Robert V. Phelan
- Production company: American Film Company
- Distributed by: Mutual Film
- Release date: July 23, 1916
- Running time: 70 minutes
- Country: United States
- Language: Silent (English intertitles)

Purity is a 1916 American seven-reel silent drama film, directed by Rae Berger and starring Audrey Munson, an artist's model who posed for many statues in New York City and the 1915 San Francisco Panama–Pacific International Exposition. The film's plot was written by Clifford Howard, art direction was by Edward Langley, and choreography was by Geneva Driscoll. The film's nude scenes caused it to be banned and preached against in some towns.

== Plot ==
Following a prologue introducing Munson, poet Thorton Darcy is writing an allegorical poem, which the film enacts with Munson portraying Virtue who meets beings such as the Muses and Evil. Darcy takes a nap and meets Purity, a simple country girl, who seems like the Virtue of his poem, which they read together. Darcy tries to publish his poems, but the publisher (Burton) wants $500 in advance for the printing, which Darcy lacks. He tells Purity he would marry her if not for his finances. Purity goes to where they met and undresses to bathe in a stream, where artist Claude Lamarque draws her, and after she finishes and dresses he approaches her and suggests she pose for him for an allegorical painting. When Darcy falls ill, she goes to the artist's studio and poses nude for Lamarque, receiving funds that she gives to the publisher. Judith Lure (Forde) meets Purity and hires her to perform at a party, and Purity recreates some statues (for which Munson had posed). Purity has Darcy's book published and it is successful. Darcy goes to the studio where Luston Black (Carroll) is attempting to seduce Purity, and Darcy defends her until Black reveals that Purity has posed in the nude. Darcy abandons her until Lamarque tells him that Purity did it for Darcy's benefit, whereupon Darcy seeks forgiveness and is reunited with Purity.

== Cast ==
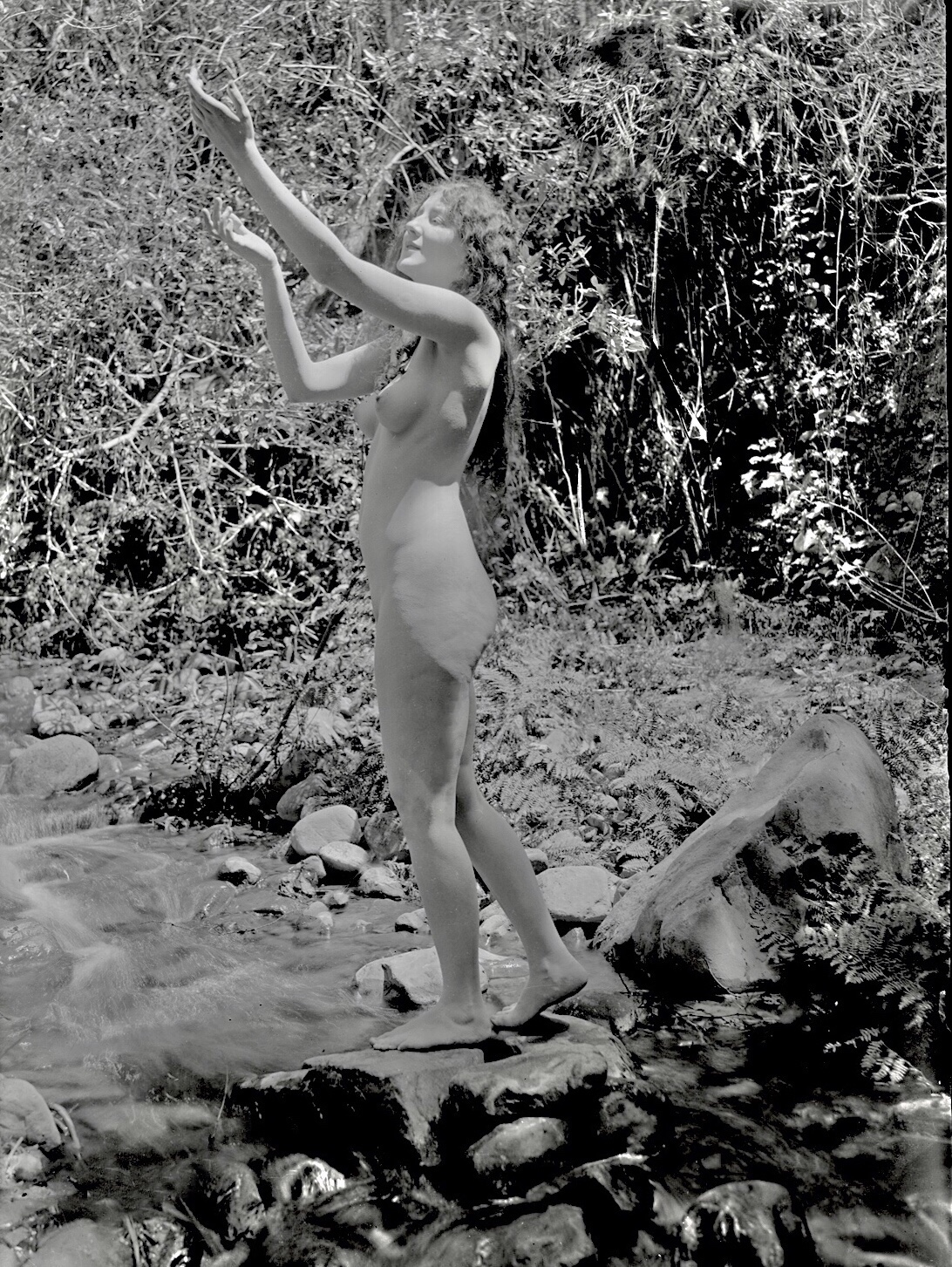
Munson in a damaged still.

- Audrey Munson as Purity / Virtue
- Nigel De Brulier as Thorton Darcy
- Alfred Hollingsworth as Claude Lamarque
- William A. Carroll as Evil / Luston Black
- Eugenie Forde as Judith Lure
- Clarence Burton as Publisher
- Nela Drinkwitz as Model
- Molly Shafer as Landlady
- Marie Van Tassell as Truth
- Mary Dunham as Music
- Alice Anaroni as Drama
- Hazel West as Art
- Nell Franzen as Maiden
- Wallace MacDonald as Youth
- Ashton Dearholt as Shepherd
- Ellen Howard as Love

== Production ==
Purity was produced by the American Film Company (known as the "Flying "A" Studios") based in Santa Barbara, California. The film was shot on the estate of Francis Townsend Underhill in Santa Barbara and was distributed by Mutual Film.

== Censorship ==
The National Board of Review (NBR) had been established by members of the film industry in 1909 in an attempt to preempt state and local censorship of films. As a result of Munson's first film, Inspiration (1915), the NBR in February 1916 revised its policy on depictions of nudity to require a critical review to pass films only when it "an essential element of a drama the nature of which warrants such presentation." Purity was submitted to the NBR in July 1916 and it held two screenings before a select group of invitees and obtained their disparate views of the film. As a result, the NBR neither passed nor rejected the film, instead issuing a list of 10 recommended deletions with a note that local censors should consider their community standards and public opinion. The deletions included scenes in the prologue where the neckline of Munson's gown was too low, scenes with suggestive expressions on the faces of men, a word on an intertitle, a shot of a nude painting in the artist's studio, all shots of Munson changing clothes at the stream and in the studio, all shots of Munson posing as reproductions of masterpieces at the party, and any shot of Munson moving while nude, while scenes of Munson posing nude at the studio should be reduced to one or two short flashes.

Not all local state and municipal film censors followed the NBR recommendations. Purity was banned in the state of Kansas and in cities including Dallas, Kansas City, Missouri, Jackson, Mississippi, and Washington, D.C., while the recommended NBR cuts were followed in Denver, Seattle, Spokane, and Takoma. Other locations either selected their own eliminations or showed the film uncut. Following this experience with Purity, the NBR announced a policy of not passing any film with nudity.

== Innocence ==
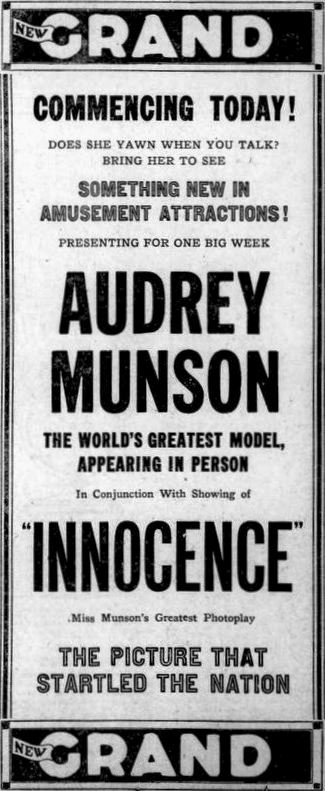
Advertisement for the film Innocence.

Isolated newspaper advertisements of 1921 and 1922 describe another Munson film called Innocence. It was during a showing of Innocence combined with a personal onstage appearance by Munson that caused her arrest in St. Louis on October 3, 1921 at the Royal Theater (later the Towne Theater) on an indecency charge. Her manager was also arrested. Both were acquitted and were still appearing in St. Louis weeks later, enacting "a series of new poses from famous paintings".

Innocence was also shown in Duluth, Minnesota, in March 1922. Here, too, Munson was to appear personally at the New Grand theater to "present a number of poses", promised at every performance. The description of the film in a blurb in the Duluth Herald details that, "In one scene more than 150 girls dance in a woodland dell, garbed in flying diaphanous draperies. Miss Geneva Driscoll, formerly of the Ruth St. Denis troupe, trained them."

That scenic description, and Geneva Driscoll's involvement, is entirely consistent with 1916 descriptions of the production of Purity. The idea that the film shown in 1921 as Innocence represents a repackaged version of 1916's Purity is also supported by the relationship between the publicist-and-journalist working for Purity's distributor Mutual Films, and Munson's independent manager for these later personal appearances. They were brothers. Credited as a columnist, Maxson F. Judell wrote promotional copy for local newspapers ("Audrey Munson... in The All-Together..."). Maxson's brother Benjamin Judell was Munson's manager arrested in St. Louis. In later years Ben Judell became the founder of the Hollywood poverty row studio Producers Releasing Corporation.

== Preservation ==
Purity was long presumed to be a lost film. However, in 2004, a copy with French intertitles was rediscovered in a private collection in France. As the print had been intended for distribution in France, it lacks any of the cuts recommended by the NBR. A copy of the film is now preserved at the Centre national de la cinématographie in Paris. This is the only Munson film still extant.

== See also ==
- List of rediscovered films
