= Doris Doscher =

American actress

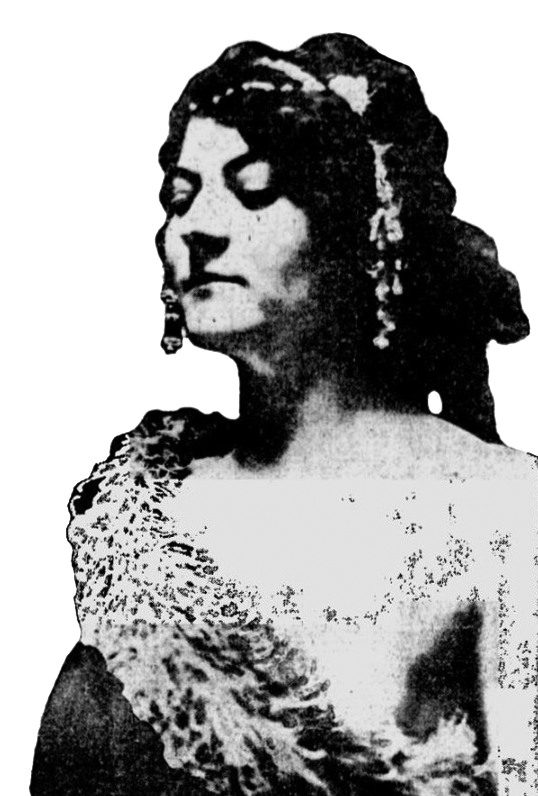
- Doris Doscher, billed as "The Girl on the Quarter"
- Born: January 24, 1882; New York City, U.S.
- Died: March 9, 1970 (aged 88); Farmingdale, New York, U.S.
- Occupations: Actress; Model

Doris Doscher (January 24, 1882 – March 9, 1970) was an American actress and model who appeared in the movie The Birth of a Race (1915), playing the role of "Eve." She posed as Liberty for the Standing Liberty quarter (1916–1930) by Hermon Atkins MacNeil. She was also the model for the Pulitzer Fountain of Abundance by Karl Bitter (completed by Isidore Konti and Karl Gruppe in 1915) in front of the Plaza Hotel in New York City. Though often attributed to model Audrey Munson, Doscher wrote "I worked with Carl [sic] Bitter as the original model for the measurements and modeling of the body... Audrey Munson modeled a few days just for the head." Doscher does not mention modeling for Konti upon continuation, and given how similar Bitter's plaster and Konti's finished bronze are, the final sculpture is likely a composite of both models.

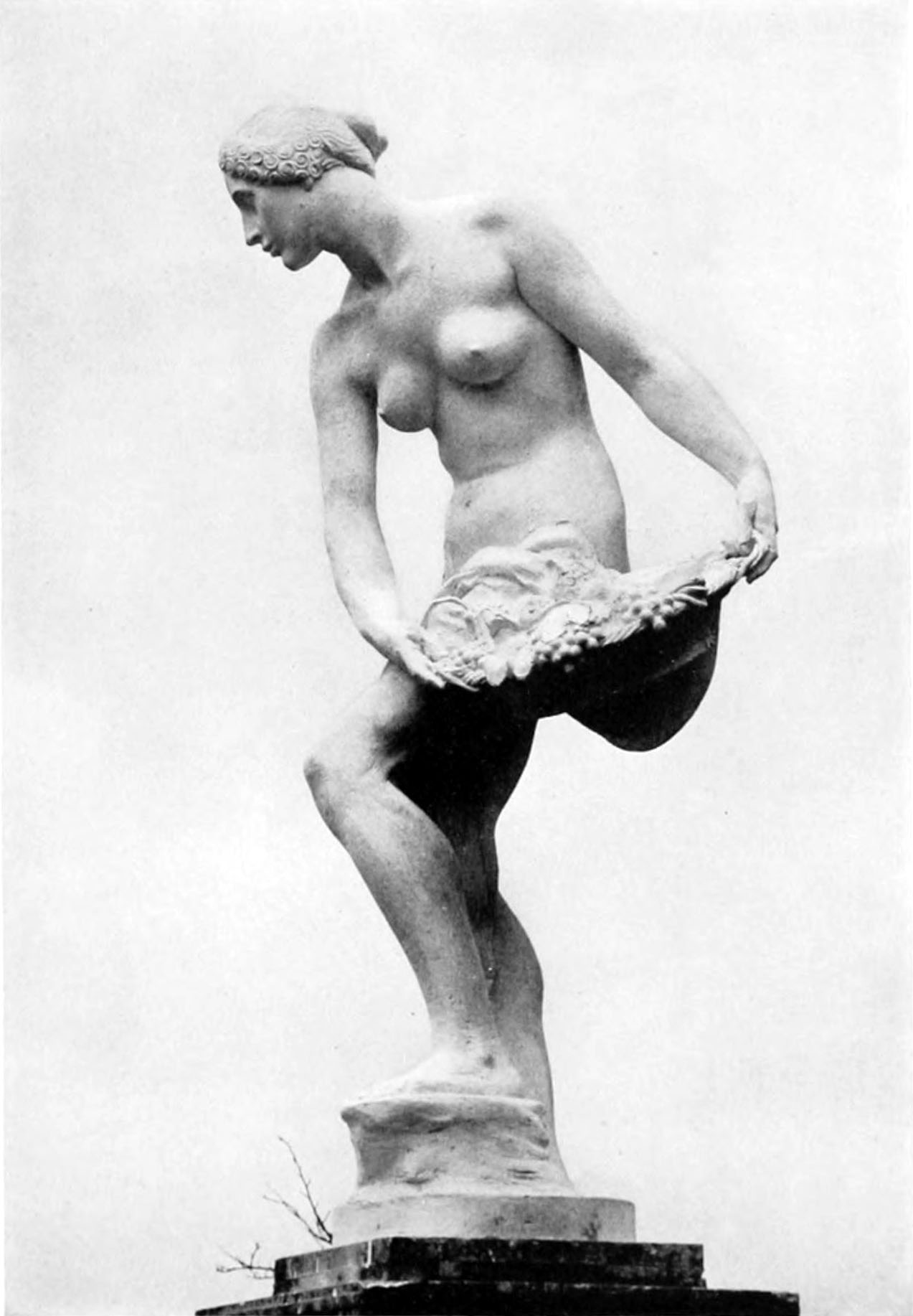
The plaster model for Karl Bitter's Abundance, worked on until his death on April 9, 1915. Doscher's body was the basis for this model.

== Career ==
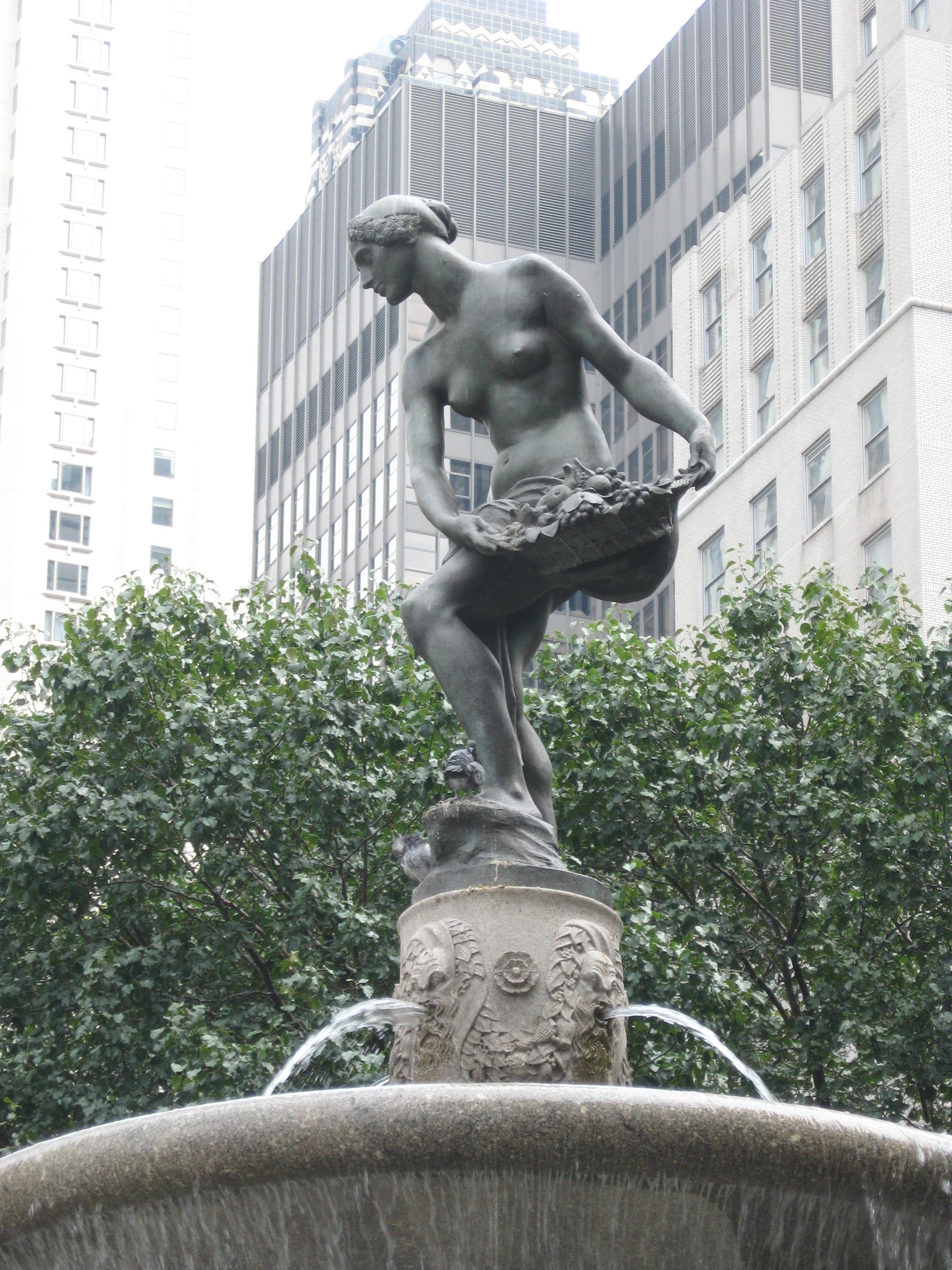
Isidore Konti's completed Abundance in the Pulitzer Fountain at the Plaza Hotel in New York.

Doscher was a silent film actress who later acted under the name Doris Doree. Doscher wed Dr. H. William Baum, a physical therapist, who had offices at 130 West 42nd Street. When she was chosen by MacNeil to pose for the quarter, she exemplified the "highest type of American womanhood". After her career as a professional model, she worked as a newspaper columnist and a radio broadcaster. Beginning in the late 1920s, Doscher wrote a daily column on health and beauty for the New York World. She lectured for years on similar topics.

== Later years and death ==
In 1966 Doscher joined New York City mayor John Lindsay in a ceremony to rename a Queens, New York, park after MacNeil. She served as president of the women's auxiliary of the American Naturopathic Association.

Doscher died at a Farmington, New York, nursing home in 1970, at the age of 88. Her residence had been 10-27 147th Street, Whitestone, New York. She was survived by her husband, a daughter, and seven grandchildren.

In 1972, however, two years after her death, newspapers reported that the actual model was Broadway actress Irene MacDowell, then aged 92 (she died the following year) whose name was said to have been concealed because her husband (one of MacNeil's tennis partners) disapproved. In an article in the December 2003 edition of The Numismatist, Timothy B. Benford Jr. suggests that the supposed deception was to fool MacNeil's wife, who saw MacDowell as a potential romantic rival. In 1982, however, Doscher's widower stated that despite the MacDowell claim, his wife had posed for the quarter.
