= Audrey Munson =

American model and actress (1891–1996)

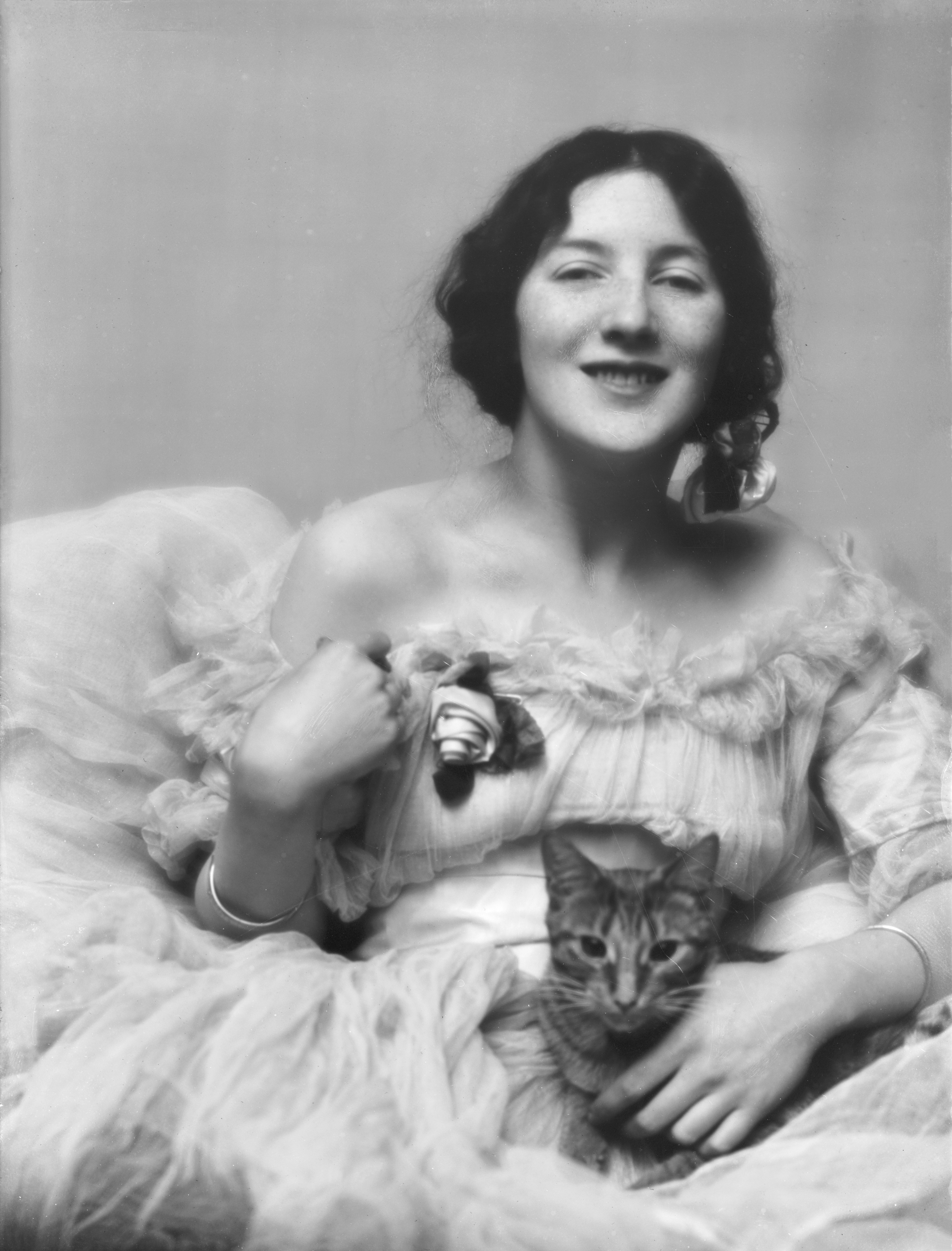
- Munson with Buzzer the cat in 1915
- Born: Audrey Marie Munson; June 8, 1891; Rochester, New York, U.S.
- Died: February 20, 1996 (aged 104); Ogdensburg, New York, U.S.
- Resting place: New Haven Cemetery
- Occupations: Artist's model, actress
- Years active: 1908–1921

Audrey Marie Munson (June 8, 1891 – February 20, 1996) was an American artist's model and film actress, considered to be "America's first supermodel." In her time, she was variously known as "Miss Manhattan", the "Panama–Pacific Girl", the "Exposition Girl" and "American Venus." She was the model or inspiration for more than twelve statues in New York City, and many others elsewhere. Munson appeared in four silent films, including unclothed in Inspiration (1915). She was one of the first American actresses to appear nude in a non-pornographic film.

== Career ==
Long after she and everyone else of this generation shall have become dust, Audrey Munson, who posed for three-fifths of all the statuary of the Panama–Pacific exposition, will live in the bronzes and canvasses of the art centers of the world.

— Richmond (Virginia) Times-Dispatch, August 1, 1915

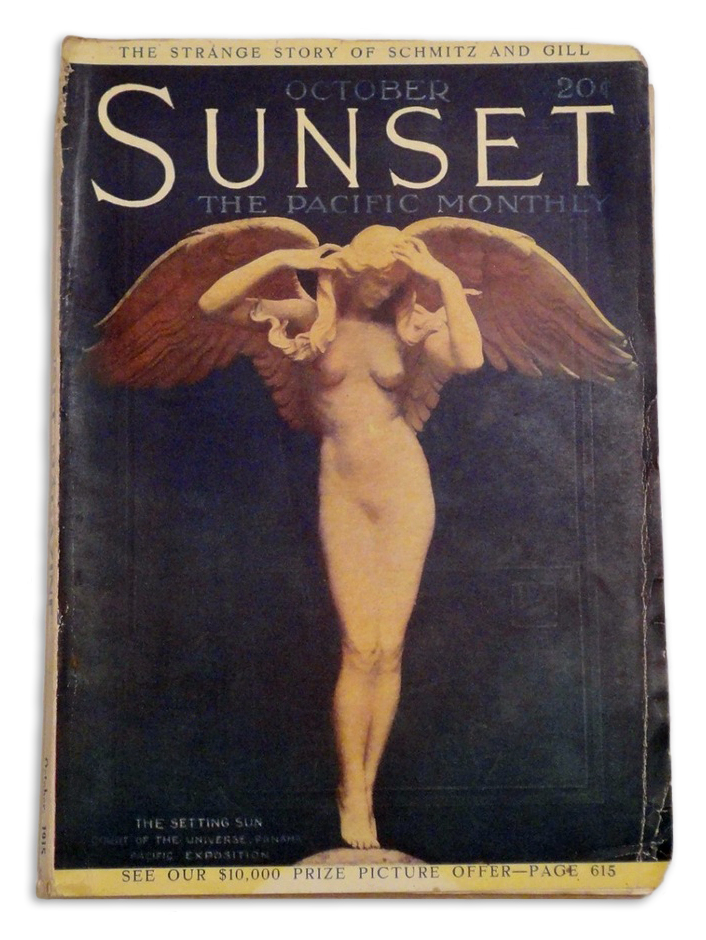
Adolph Alexander Weinman's Descending Night, featured on the cover of Sunset magazine (October 1915)

=== Model ===
Audrey Marie Munson was born in Rochester, New York, on June 8, 1891, to Edgar Munson (1854–1945), who was a streetcar conductor and Western real estate speculator descended from English Puritans, and Katherine C. "Kittie" Mahoney (1862–1958), a daughter of John and Cecilia Mahoney, Irish immigrants. Her father was from Mexico, New York, and she later lived there. Her parents divorced when she was eight, and Audrey and her mother moved to Providence, Rhode Island.

In 1909, mother and daughter moved to Washington Heights in New York City, where the 17-year-old Audrey sought a career as an actress and chorus girl. Her first role on Broadway was as a "footman" in The Boy and The Girl at the Aerial Gardens of the New Amsterdam Theatre, which ran from May 31 – June 19, 1909. She also appeared in The Girl and the Wizard, Girlies and La Belle Parée.

While window-shopping on Fifth Avenue with her mother she was spotted by photographer Felix Benedict Herzog, who asked her to pose for him at his studio in the Lincoln Arcade Building on Broadway and 65th Street. Herzog introduced her to his friends in the art world. She posed for muralist William de Leftwich Dodge, who gave her a letter of introduction to Isidore Konti. Konti was her first sculptor and her first nude modeling. From this point, Munson would pose for several well-known artists, including painter Francis Coates Jones, illustrators Harrison Fisher, Archie Gunn, and Charles Dana Gibson, and photographers Herzog and Arnold Genthe, but she predominately modeled for sculptors.

Munson's first acknowledged credit is Konti's marble statuary called Three Graces, unveiled in the new Grand Ballroom at the Hotel Astor in Times Square in September 1909. She posed for all three Graces. Soon after that and for the next decade, Munson became the model of choice for the first tier of American sculptors, posing for a long list of freestanding statuary, monuments, and allegorical architectural sculpture on state capitols and other major public buildings. According to The Sun in 1913, "Over a hundred artists agree that if the name of Miss Manhattan belongs to anyone in particular it is to this young woman."

By 1915, she was so well-established that she became Alexander Stirling Calder's model of choice when he became Director of Sculpture for the Panama–Pacific International Exposition held in San Francisco that year. Her figure was "ninety times repeated against the sky" on one building alone, atop the colonnades of the Court of the Universe, roughly modeled on St. Peter's Square in the Vatican. In fact, Munson posed for three-fifths of the sculptures created for the event and earned fame as the "Panama–Pacific Girl".

=== Film actress ===
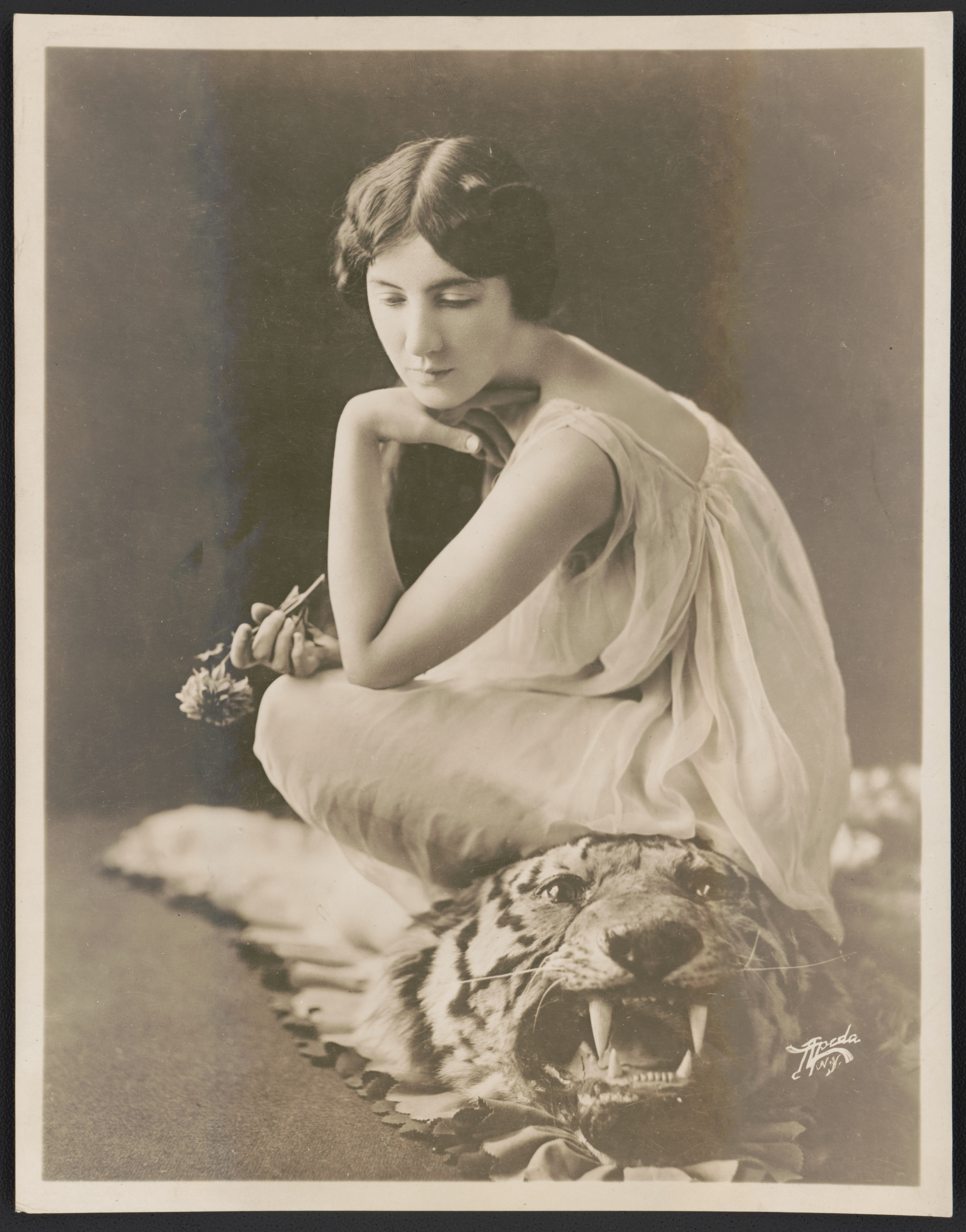
Audrey Munson in Purity, Liberty Theatre

Munson's newfound celebrity helped launch her career in the nascent film industry and she starred in four silent films. In the first, Inspiration (1915), made by the Thanhouser Film Corporation in New Rochelle, New York and directed by George Foster Platt, she appeared fully nude in a story of a sculptor's model. The censors were reluctant to ban the film, fearing they would also have to ban Renaissance art. Munson's films were a box office success, although the critics were divided. Thanhouser hired a lookalike named Jane Thomas to do Munson's acting scenes, while Munson did the scenes where she posed nude. Although Munson's appearance in Inspiration is sometimes said to be the first occasion of an American actress appearing nude in a non-pornographic film, according to film historian Karen Ward Mahr, Margaret Edwards did so first in Hypocrites, which was released earlier in 1915.

Munson's second film, Purity (1916), made by the American Film Company in Santa Barbara, California and directed by Rae Berger, is the only one of her films to survive, being rediscovered in 1993 in a "pornography" collection in France and acquired by the French national cinema archive. Her third film, The Girl o' Dreams, also made by American in Santa Barbara and probably directed by Tom Ricketts from a story by William Pigott (the American Film Institute catalog lists Pigott as director, but all his other credits list him as a writer), was completed by the fall of 1916; although the film is mentioned on the credit lists of several of its actors in the October 21, 1916 Motion Picture Studio Directory, it was not released at that time and not copyrighted until December 31, 1918; there is no subsequent mention of the film and it may never have been released.

Munson returned to the East Coast by train via Syracuse in December 1916, having been involved with high society in New York and Newport, Rhode Island. There are accounts in which her mother insists she married the son of a "Comstock Lode" silver heir, Hermann Oelrichs Jr., then the richest bachelor in America. There is no record of this. On January 27, 1919, she wrote a rambling letter to the U.S. State Department denouncing Oelrichs as part of a pro-German network that had driven her out of the movie business. She said she planned to abandon the United States to restart her movie career in England.

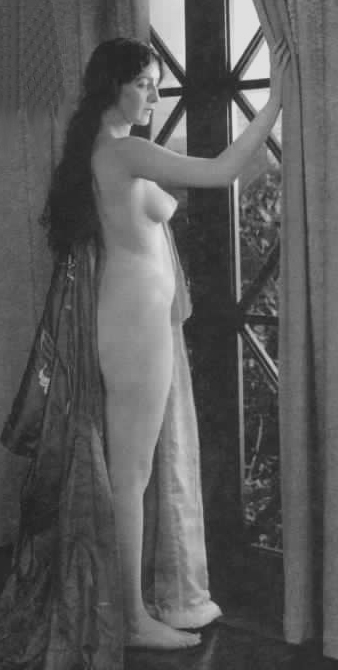
in Heedless Moths (1921)

=== Notoriety ===
In 1919, Audrey Munson was living with her mother in a boarding house at 164 West 65th Street, Manhattan, owned by Dr. Walter Wilkins. Wilkins fell in love with Munson, and on February 27, murdered his wife, Julia, so he could be available for marriage. Munson and her mother left New York, and the police sought them for questioning. After a nationwide hunt, they were located. They refused to return to New York, but were questioned by agents from the Burns Detective Agency in Toronto, Ontario, Canada. The contents of the affidavits they supplied have never been revealed, but Audrey Munson strongly denied that she had any romantic relationship with Dr. Wilkins. Wilkins was tried, found guilty, and sentenced to the electric chair. He hanged himself in his prison cell before the sentence could be carried out.

The Wilkins killing may even have marked the end of Munson's modeling career, although she continued to seek regular newspaper coverage. By 1920, Munson could not find work anywhere and was reported as living in Syracuse, New York, supported by her mother, who sold kitchen utensils door-to-door. In November 1920, she was said to be working as a ticket-taker in a dime museum.

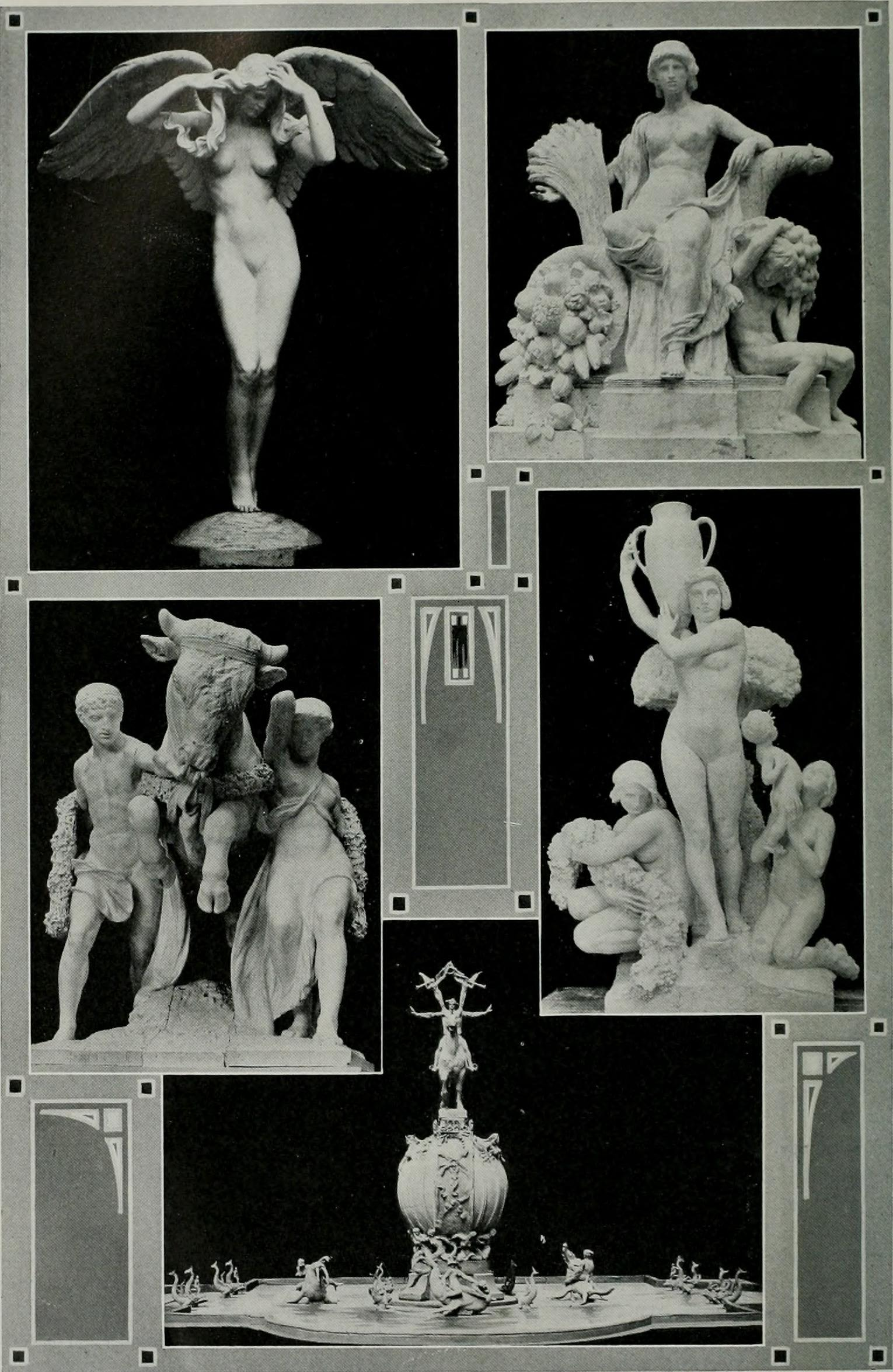
Munson posed for all these Panama-Pacific International Exhibition sculptures.

From January to May 1921, a series of twenty serialized articles ran in Hearst's Sunday Magazine in dozens of Sunday newspaper supplements, under Munson's name, entitled By the 'Queen of the Artists' Studios'. The twenty articles relate anecdotes from her career, with warnings about the fates of other models. In one of them, she asked the reader to imagine her future:

What becomes of the artists' models? I am wondering if many of my readers have not stood before a masterpiece of lovely sculpture or a remarkable painting of a young girl, her very abandonment of draperies accentuating rather than diminishing her modesty and purity, and asked themselves the question, "Where is she now, this model who was so beautiful?"

In February that year, agent-producer Allen Rock took out advertisements showing a $27,500 check he said he had paid Munson to star in a fourth film titled Heedless Moths, directed by Robert Z. Leonard from his own screenplay based on these writings. She later said the $27,500 check was just a "publicity stunt," and she filed suit against Allen Rock. Those proceedings revealed that the twenty articles had been ghostwritten by journalist Henry Leyford Gates.

In the summer of 1921, Munson conducted a nationwide search, carried by the United Press, for the perfect man to marry. She ended the search in August claiming she did not want to get married anyway. On October 3, 1921, she was arrested at the Royal Theater (later the Towne Theater) in St. Louis on a morals charge related to her personal appearance with the film Innocence (the reissue title of Purity), in which she had a leading role. She and her manager, independent film producer Ben Judell, were both acquitted. Weeks later, she was still appearing in St. Louis, along with screenings of Innocence, enacting "a series of new poses from famous paintings".

On May 27, 1922, Munson attempted suicide by swallowing a solution of bichloride of mercury.

=== Later life and death ===
On June 8, 1931, Munson's mother petitioned a judge to commit her to a mental asylum. The Oswego County judge ordered Munson be admitted into a psychiatric facility for treatment on her 40th birthday. She remained in the St. Lawrence State Hospital for the Insane in Ogdensburg, New York, where she was treated for depression and schizophrenia for almost 65 years, until she died at the age of 104.

In the mid-1950s, Munson was still famous enough to serve as the subject of an anecdote in a memoir that P.G. Wodehouse and Guy Bolton wrote of their years on Broadway, Bring on the Girls! (1953), though that memoir is considered more fiction than fact by Wodehouse's biographer. (Note: A letter to The New York Times in 1996 recounted the story: Wodehouse was working alone in an apartment that has recently been vacated by a sculptor. His wife told him to expect a woman who would redo the couch, so when Audrey Munson knocked and asked if there was any work for her, Wodehouse said yes and "How much would it be altogether?" "You want the altogether?" she replied and ducked into a bedroom. She "emerged in an advanced form of nudity," which Wodehouse thought was "pretty eccentric even for a lady decorator." Anyway, things got sorted out, and Bolton thought the situation so funny that he incorporated it into the play they were working on, Oh, Lady, Lady.)

Munson had no visitors at the asylum for over 25 years after her mother died in 1958, until her half-niece, Darlene Bradley, rediscovered her in 1984, when Munson was 93. In the mid-1980s, Munson, in her mid-90s, was moved to a nursing home in Massena, New York, as the original hospital closed; however, she would often escape to a nearby bar, with employees in the nursing home having to find her. Consequently, she was moved back to the new mental institution. By the time she turned 100, she had no teeth and lost much of her hearing but was otherwise in good health. Shortly after her 100th birthday, Munson broke a hip. Munson died on February 20, 1996, at the age of 104. At the time only one local newspaper reported her death. She was buried at New Haven Cemetery in New Haven, New York, and she received a headstone on her grave on June 8, 2016, 20 years after her death and on what would have been her 125th birthday.

== Sculptures of Munson ==
This table is organized by sculptor and date. She posed for most of the sculptors who created architectural and fountain sculptures for the 1915 Panama-Pacific International Exposition, and for other sculptors who exhibited there.

Coverage of Munson's career contained inaccuracies during her lifetime, and errors about the works for which she modeled have been perpetuated. Munson herself was inconsistent about her age and other matters. For example, a June 1915 article listed the 24-year-old Munson's age as 18, and an August 1915 press release claimed that she started posing at age 14 which would have been four years before her first known modeling credit, for Konti's Three Graces group at the Hotel Astor, unveiled to the public in September 1909 when she was 18.

Key:
Works for which Munson was
too young to have posed
Works for which Munson
confirmed she posed
Works for which Munson allegedly
posed, but without direct evidence
Panama-Pacific
International Exposition

Sculptor	Title	Image	Year	Location/GPS Coordinates	Material	Height	Notes
Herbert Adams	The Three Graces		1912	James McMillan Fountain, McMillan Reservoir, Washington, D.C.	bronze	12 ft (3.7 m) (overall)	The McMillan Fountain was disassembled for the 1941 expansion of McMillan Reservoir. The pieces spent decades in storage, and suffered vandalism. Only the central figures and upper basin remain.
Herbert Adams	Priestess of Culture		1914	Rotunda, Palace of Fine Arts, Panama-Pacific International Exposition	staff	51.5 in (131 cm)	Adams was awarded a PPIE Medal of Honor for his sculpture. Eight identical goddess figures stood atop columns inside the Rotunda of the Palace of Fine Arts. Those now in place are reproductions. The two surviving original figures are in the collection of the Exploratorium.
Robert Ingersoll Aitken	Greenhut Mausoleum door		1913	tomb of merchandiser Joseph B. Greenhut, Salem Fields Cemetery, Brooklyn, New York City	bronze		Stone, Gould & Farrington, architects
Robert Ingersoll Aitken	Gates Mausoleum door		1913	John Warne Gates Mausoleum, Woodlawn Cemetery, Bronx, New York City	bronze		Stone, Gould & Farrington, architects Aitken was awarded a PPIE silver medal for his sculpture.
Robert Ingersoll Aitken	Panama-Pacific $50 U.S. Gold Coin		1915				
Robert Ingersoll Aitken	The Elements: Air		1915	Flanking stairs to sunken garden, Court of the Universe, Panama-Pacific International Exposition	staff		
Robert Ingersoll Aitken	The Elements: Earth		1915	Flanking stairs to sunken garden, Court of the Universe, Panama-Pacific International Exposition	staff		
Robert Ingersoll Aitken	Fountain of the Earth		1915	Court of the Universe, Panama-Pacific International Exposition	staff		Fountain of the Earth:
Karl Bitter	Venus		c.1895	Library, Biltmore Estate, Asheville, North Carolina	steel		Bitter's andiron figure of Venus for Biltmore was completed in 1895, (Note: Bitter modeled a statuette of Venus as the crowning figure for an andiron in the library of the Biltmore Estate in Asheville, North Carolina, 1893–1895. He exhibited a plaster version at the National Sculpture Society in 1898, and donated a 23.75 in (60.3 cm) bronze cast to the National Academy of Design in May 1904.) when Munson was 4 years old. A life-sided Venus Coming from the Bath was photographed in Bitter's studio in 1901, when Munson was 10 years old.
Karl Bitter	Venus de Milo (with arms)		by 1921	Noordeinde Palace, The Hague, Netherlands	marble		Queen Wilhelmina of the Netherlands commissioned a Venus de Milo (with arms) from Bitter. Munson wrote that Bitter experimented with different arrangements of the arms, modeled the sculpture in clay, and carved it in marble himself.
Karl Bitter	Peace		1896–1900	Appellate Division Courthouse of New York State, 35 East 25th Street, Manhattan, New York City			Bitter completed his work on the Appellate Courthouse in June; 1899, about the time Munson turned 8 years old.
Karl Bitter	Peace		by 1921				Munson wrote that she posed for Bitter for a sculpture of Peace (pictured), but it was not the Appellate Courthouse work.
Karl Bitter	Liberty Supported by the Law		1906–1910	East Pediment, Wisconsin State Capitol; Madison, Wisconsin	Bethel Vermont granite	96 in (240 cm)	East Pediment:
Karl Bitter	Bas relief: Diana		c.1910?	Ballroom, George Jay Gould I Mansion, Manhattan, New York City	marble		This may have been related to Bitter's famous 1910 bronze of Diana. Actress Doris Doscher (1882–1970) was said to have been the basis for Diana as early as May 1917 in a nationally syndicated newspaper article. This is four years prior to the earliest known Munson claim.
Karl Bitter	Pomona or Abundance		plaster 1898, 1915 bronze 1916 (by Konti)	Pulitzer Fountain, Grand Army Plaza, Manhattan, New York City	bronze	plaster 24 in (61 cm) bronze 84 in (210 cm)	Pomona was a 24 in (61 cm) plaster maquette at the time of Bitter's April 9, 1915, death. Bitter's widow asked Isidore Konti to complete the work, which was dedicated in May 1916. Munson was publicly credited as the model for Pomona as early as August 1916. Doris Doscher also claimed to have been the model for Pomona, telling The New York Times in 1931, "I worked with Carl [sic] Bitter as the original model for the measurements and modeling of the body... Audrey modeled a few days just for the head." (Bitter may have used more than one model, or Konti may have used a different model.)
Alexander Stirling Calder	Star Maiden	Star, for the "Colonnade of Stars," Court of the Universe building, 1915 Panama Pacific International Exposition, San Francisco	1915	Panama-Pacific International Exposition; Oakland Museum; Oakland, California	bronze	48 in (120 cm)	Star Maiden was repeated ninety-five times as a roof balustrade figure surrounding the Court of the Universe and the Colonnade of Stars:
Alexander Stirling Calder	Flower Girl		1915	Court of Flowers, Panama-Pacific International Exposition	staff		Flower Girl was repeated in niches above the colonnade of the Court of Flowers. Edgar Walter's Beauty and the Beast Fountain is in the foreground.
Alexander Stirling Calder	Enterprise; Crowning figure		1915	The Nations of the West, atop Arch of the Setting Sun, Panama-Pacific International Exposition	staff		The Nations of the West Arch of the Setting Sun:
Alexander Stirling Calder	The Mother of Tomorrow; Central figure		1915	The Nations of the West, atop Arch of the Setting Sun, Panama-Pacific International Exposition	staff		The Nations of the West Arch of the Setting Sun:
Alexander Stirling Calder	Eastern Hemisphere (reclining female nude with the head of a lioness, east side of the globe)		1915	Fountain of Energy, Panama-Pacific International Exposition	staff		Fountain of Energy:
Alexander Stirling Calder	The Atlantic Ocean (F. G. R. Roth modeled the dolphin)		1915	Fountain of Energy, Panama-Pacific International Exposition	staff		Fountain of Energy:
Alexander Stirling Calder	The Pacific Ocean (F. G. R. Roth modeled the manatee)		1915	Fountain of Energy, Panama-Pacific International Exposition	staff		Fountain of Energy:
Alexander Stirling Calder	Nereid No. 1, No. 2 and No. 3 (F. G. R. Roth modeled the dolphins) Three nereids riding dolphins, repeated (as a group) four times around the fountain's basin. A water jet spouted from each dolphin's mouth.		1915	Fountain of Energy, Panama-Pacific International Exposition	staff		Fountain of Energy:
Alexander Stirling Calder	Caryatid (John Bateman assisted on this work)		1915	Attic of Colonnade (above each column), Court of Palms, Panama-Pacific International Exposition	staff		Court of Palms:
Ulric Ellerhusen	Wonderment		1915	exterior of Rotunda dome, Palace of Fine Arts, Panama-Pacific International Exposition	staff	23 ft (7.0 m)	A pair of standing figures, Contemplation (male) and Wonderment (female), flank the relief panels on each face of the Rotunda's dome. The figures were recast in cast stone by Spero Anargyros in 1969.
Ulric Ellerhusen	Consolation (Weeping Maidens or Drooping Maidens)		1915	Pergola of the Palace of Fine Arts, Panama-Pacific International Exposition	staff		"In the goddesses atop the towers and minarets and in the Grecian boxes adorning the Roman columns of the Palace of the Fine Arts will be found the enchanting line of the [Munson's] girlish form."
Ulric Ellerhusen	Garland figures		1915	Peristyle Walk, Palace of Fine Arts, Panama-Pacific International Exposition	staff		A set of five larger-than-life, high-relief figures, repeated around the four semi-circular, ground-level planters
John Flanagan	Medallion: Head of Audrey Munson		1915	Palace of Fine Arts, Panama-Pacific International Exposition	bronze		Flanagan was awarded a PPIE Medal of Honor for his sculpture.
John Flanagan	Medal of Award, Panama-Pacific; International Exposition		1915		bronze	2.76 in (70 mm)	obverse:
Daniel Chester French	Mourning Victory (Note: The early date makes it unlikely that Munson posed for the Melvin Memorial in 1906 (at age 14 or 15). Six years later, French created a mirror-image version for the Metropolitan Museum of Art, likely the Mourning Victory for which Munson posed. See Talk page for discussion.)		1906–1908	Melvin Memorial, Sleepy Hollow Cemetery, Concord, Massachusetts	Tennessee marble	115 in (290 cm)	Memorial to Asa, Samuel and John Melvin, three brothers who fought and died in the American Civil War. Munson was 15 years old when the memorial was completed. The sculpture has since been credited to model Hettie Anderson.
Daniel Chester French	Mourning Victory (mirror image of the Melvin Memorial)		carved 1912–1914	Metropolitan Museum of Art, Manhattan, New York City	marble	120.5 in (306 cm)	James C. Melvin, the only surviving brother, funded the carving of a mirror-image marble version, and donated it to MMA. MMA also owns a bronze cast of Victory's head, but this has again been attributed to Hettie Anderson.
Daniel Chester French	Memory		modeled c.1909 carved 1917–1919	Metropolitan Museum of Art, Manhattan, New York City	marble	57.5 in (146 cm)	A plaster model is at Chesterwood, French's home and studio in Stockbridge, Massachusetts. (Pictured, center) Actress Doris Doscher also claimed to have modeled for Memory as early as November 1920 in Physical Culture (Macfadden magazine).
Daniel Chester French	Jurisprudence		1910–1912	Metzenbaum United States Courthouse, Cleveland, Ohio	marble	12 ft (3.7 m)	Located at street level, near the corners of the Superior Avenue façade.
Daniel Chester French	Commerce		1910–1912	Metzenbaum United States Courthouse, Cleveland, Ohio	marble	12 ft (3.7 m)	Located at street level, near the corners of the Superior Avenue façade.
Daniel Chester French	Wisconsin		1912	Wisconsin State Capitol, Madison, Wisconsin	gilded bronze	15.5 ft (4.7 m)	Atop Wisconsin State Capitol Dome:
Daniel Chester French	Evangeline (bas relief figure, 2nd from right)		1912–1914	Henry Wadsworth Longfellow Memorial, Longfellow Park, Cambridge, Massachusetts	marble	36 in (91 cm)	In Longfellow Park:
Daniel Chester French	The Spirit of Life		1913–1915	Spencer Trask Memorial, Congress Park, Saratoga Springs, New York	bronze	122 in (310 cm)	In Congress Park Eight bronze casts from French's 1914 reduced-size working model are in the collections of: Smithsonian American Art Museum, Indianapolis Museum of Art, Newark Museum, Newark, New Jersey, Brooks Memorial Library, Brattleboro, Vermont, and elsewhere. New research suggests that Hettie Anderson was at least partially, if not entirely, the basis for this figure.
Daniel Chester French	The Genius of Creation; Eve (Note: The PPIE catalogue for the Palace of Fine Arts does not list a sculpture by French titled Eve. Adam and Eve may be the nude couple flanking the Angel on French's Genius of Creation. See Talk page for discussion.)		1915	West entrance to Palace of Machinery, Panama-Pacific International Exposition	staff		French was awarded a PPIE Medal of Honor for his sculpture. West entrance to Palace of Machinery: A plaster model is at Chesterwood, French's home and studio in Stockbridge, Massachusetts:
Daniel Chester French	Brooklyn		1916	Brooklyn Museum, Brooklyn, New York City	granite		The pair were created to adorn the Brooklyn side of the Manhattan Bridge. Relocated to exterior of the Brooklyn Museum, 1963. At least some of the modeling for the Brooklyn figure was done by Rosalie Miller.
Daniel Chester French	Manhattan		1916	Brooklyn Museum, Brooklyn, New York City	granite		The pair were created to adorn the Brooklyn side of the Manhattan Bridge. Relocated to exterior of the Brooklyn Museum, 1963. At least some of the modeling for the Brooklyn figure was done by Rosalie Miller.
Sherry Edmundson Fry	70th Street pediment		1913	Frick Mansion, Fifth Avenue & East 70th Street, Manhattan, New York City	Bedford blue limestone		
Sherry Edmundson Fry	Maidenhood		1914	Brookgreen Gardens, Murrells Inlet, South Carolina	bronze	67.3 in (171 cm)	Ex collection: Metropolitan Museum of Art
Sherry Edmundson Fry	Peace (Maidenhood)		1914–1915	Peristyle Walk, Exterior of Palace of Fine Arts, Panama-Pacific International Exposition	bronze		Fry was awarded a PPIE silver medal for his sculpture.
Sherry Edmundson Fry	Cartouche		1915	Female nude beside shield, over great arched window of Festival Hall, Panama-Pacific International Exposition	staff		Festival Hall:
Sherry Edmundson Fry	Flora		1915	Twin figures atop pedestals at base of pylons of Festival Hall, Panama-Pacific International Exposition	staff		Festival Hall:
Sherry Edmundson Fry	Torch Bearer		1915	Figure repeated atop the four corner domes of Festival Hall, Panama-Pacific International Exposition	staff		Festival Hall:
Sherry Edmundson Fry	Reclining Woman (Listening Woman); Pylon figure		1915	atop east pylon of Festival Hall, Panama-Pacific International Exposition	staff		Festival Hall:
Sherry Edmundson Fry	Ceres, Goddess of Agriculture		1921	Missouri State Capitol, Jefferson City, Missouri	bronze	124 in (310 cm)	Atop Missouri State Capitol Dome:
Carl Augustus Heber	Spirit of Commerce		1909–1914	Manhattan Bridge (south pier), Manhattan, New York City	granite		
Carl Augustus Heber	Relief tablet over entrance		c.1912	The Little Theatre (now Helen Hayes Theatre), 238 West 44th Street, Manhattan, New York City	marble		In a 1913 photograph:
Albert Jaegers	Harvest (Nature)		1915	atop Half-Dome, Court of the Four Seasons, Panama-Pacific International Exposition	staff		Jaegers was awarded a PPIE bronze medal for his sculpture. Half Dome, Court of the Four Seasons:
Albert Jaegers	Sunshine; Rain		1915	atop columns flanking the Half-Dome, Court of the Four Seasons, Panama-Pacific International Exposition	staff		Jaegers was awarded a PPIE bronze medal for his sculpture. Half Dome, Court of the Four Seasons:
Albert Jaegers	The Feast of Sacrifice		1915	Heroic-sized group, repeated twice atop pylons above Forecourt of Ceres, Court of the Four Seasons, Panama-Pacific International Exposition	staff		The Feast of Sacrifice (at upper corners):
Augustus Jaegers	Abundance; Attic figures		1915	Court of the Four Seasons, Panama-Pacific International Exposition	staff		Augustus Jaegers (brother of Albert) modeled the attic and spandrel figures on the arcades in the Court of the Four Seasons. Abundance was repeated sixteen times on the arcades.
Isidore Konti	The Three Graces		c.1909		marble		Created for the new ballroom of the Hotel Astor, opened September 29, 1909 (second balcony): At the other end of the ballroom, a companion marble group called The Song featured similar figures, possibly also modeled by Munson.
Isidore Konti	Three Muses		undated	Hudson River Museum, Yonkers, New York	plaster	23 in (58 cm)	
Isidore Konti	Mother and Child: The Bath (Fountain Group)		c.1910	private collection	marble	two-thirds life size	
Isidore Konti	Solace		1911	Hudson River Museum, Yonkers, New York	plaster	28 in (71 cm)	
Isidore Konti	Fame and Victory (relief figures)		c.1915	Column of Human Progress, Forecourt of the Stars, Panama-Pacific International Exposition	staff		Four relief panels with heroic-sized figures surrounded the base of the 180 ft (55 m)-tall Column of Human Progress. Munson was the model for Fame and Victory, which flanked the entrance to its vault.
Isidore Konti	Pomona		1915–1916	Pulitzer Fountain, Grand Army Plaza, Manhattan, New York City	bronze	84 in (210 cm)	Karl Bitter's widow asked Konti to complete Pomona following Bitter's death in April 1915. Konti enlarged it from a 24 in (61 cm) maquette, added detail, and made minor changes. His full-size plaster model was completed in January 1916, approved by Bitter's widow in February, and sent to the foundry in March. The fountain was dedicated in May 1916.
Evelyn Beatrice Longman	Consecration (L'Amour)		modeled 1909–1912 carved 1914	Wadsworth Athenaeum, Hartford, Connecticut	marble	36 in (91 cm)	Exhibited in the Palace of Fine Arts at the 1915 Panama-Pacific International Exposition. Longman was awarded a PPIE silver medal for her sculpture.
Evelyn Beatrice Longman	Fountain of Ceres		1915	Forecourt, Court of the Four Seasons, Panama-Pacific International Exposition	staff		Forecourt, Court of the Four Seasons:
Augustus Lukeman	Memory; Titanic Memorial		1913–1914	Straus Memorial, Straus Park, West 106th Street (west of Broadway), Manhattan, New York City	bronze	36 in (91 cm)	Memorial to Ida and Isidor Straus, who died in the 1912 sinking of the RMS Titanic. The park and memorial were dedicated on April 15, 1915, the third anniversary of the sinking.
Frederick MacMonnies	Beauty		c.1911–1917	New York Public Library Main Branch, Fifth Avenue at East 41st Street, Manhattan, New York City	Carrara marble	120 in (300 cm)	Located just south of the Fifth Avenue entrance. Munson wrote that MacMonnies used her for the legs, and another model for the torso and face. (Note: "When Mr. MacMonnies made this charming work he showed the face and torso of a model who fitted closer in these respects to his inspiration than did mine, but my legs were better for his purposes than hers.")
Allen George Newman	Mermaid (unlocated)		1910	Music of the Waters Fountain (demolished), Riverside Drive at 156th Street, Manhattan, New York City	marble		"Up on Riverside Drive, Allen George Newman's fountain 'Music of the Water' shows another pose of this young woman."
Allen George Newman	The Triumph of Peace		1911	Peace Monument, Piedmont Park, Atlanta, Georgia	bronze	108 in (270 cm)	Peace Monument in Piedmont Park:
Allen George Newman	Florida's Tribute to the Women of the Confederacy		1914–1915	Confederate Park, Jacksonville, Florida	bronze	seated figure 42 in (110 cm) flagbearer 13 ft (4.0 m)	Munson likely posed for the flagbearer atop the monument. (Note: Munson misremembered the figure as having been for the dome of the South Carolina State House (which has no statue).) She also may have posed for the young mother reading to her children.
Attilio Piccirilli	Columbia Triumphant		1901–1913	USS Maine National Monument, Central Park, Manhattan, New York City	gilded bronze	16.5 ft (5.0 m)	
Attilio Piccirilli	Peace		1901–1913	USS Maine National Monument, Central Park, Manhattan, New York City	marble		
Attilio Piccirilli	Duty		1910–1913	Firemen's Memorial, Riverside Park, Riverside Drive at West 100th Street, Manhattan, New York City	Knoxville marble		
Attilio Piccirilli	Sacrifice		1910–1913	Firemen's Memorial, Riverside Park, Riverside Drive at West 100th Street, Manhattan, New York City	Knoxville marble		
Attilio Piccirilli	A Soul (Alone? Widowhood?) (Note: A Soul was a figure study of woman rising and twisting her body. The titles Alone and Widowhood do not appear in the PPIE catalogue for the Palace of Fine Arts.)		1915	Exhibited outside Palace of Fine Arts, Panama-Pacific International Exposition	marble		Piccirilli was awarded a PPIE gold medal for his sculpture.
Attilio Piccirilli	Sapientia (Wisdom)		completed 1917	Learning of the World (north pediment), Wisconsin State Capitol, Madison, Wisconsin	Bethel white granite	96 in (240 cm)	North pediment:
Furio Piccirilli	Eurydice		1911	Exhibited outside Palace of Fine Arts, Panama-Pacific International Exposition	marble		Piccirilli was awarded a PPIE silver medal for his sculpture.
Furio Piccirilli	Summer		1915	Court of the Four Seasons, Panama-Pacific International Exposition	staff		Each season group was placed in a niche screened by a colonnade, and set upon a curved stepped base, down which water cascaded.
Furio Piccirilli	Autumn		1915	Court of the Four Seasons, Panama-Pacific International Exposition	staff		Fountain of Autumn:
Furio Piccirilli	Winter		1915	Court of the Four Seasons, Panama-Pacific International Exposition	staff		Fountain of Winter:
Furio Piccirilli	Spring (Munson posed for both the female figures)		1915	Court of the Four Seasons, Panama-Pacific International Exposition	staff		Fountain of Spring:
Edmond Thomas Quinn	Audrey		1915	Exhibited at Palace of Fine Arts, Panama-Pacific International Exposition	freestanding bronze		Quinn was awarded a PPIE silver medal for his sculpture.
Ulysses Ricci	Portrait of Miss Audrey Munson		1914	whereabouts unknown	bronze		Exhibited at National Academy of Design in 1914; Exhibited at Syracuse Museum of Fine Arts
Frederick Ruckstull	Monument to South Carolina Women of the Confederacy		1909–1912	South Carolina State House, Columbia, South Carolina	bronze	14 ft (4.3 m)	
Salvatore Cartaino Scarpitta	Lady Godiva		by 1914	unknown	silver		"Even on Fifth avenue you will find her at a famous silversmith's sitting dejectedly on a white horse as Lady Godiva in a beautiful piece of work made by Scarpetti [sic]."
Salvatore Cartaino Scarpitta	The Light That Failed		1915				
Salvatore Cartaino Scarpitta	Starlight		c.1915	Collection of John D. Rockefeller Jr. (1921)			
Salvatore Cartaino Scarpitta	Maidenhood		by 1921	Collection of Henry Clay Frick (1921)			
Francois Tonetti	Water Nymph		by 1921	Kykuit (John D. Rockefeller Estate); Pocantico Hills, New York			
Edgar Walter	Beauty and the Beast		1915	Beauty and the Beast Fountain, Court of Flowers, Panama-Pacific International Exposition	staff		Beauty and the Beast Fountain:
Adolph Alexander Weinman	Day and Night Pair of figures flanking the exterior clocks, repeated over the station's four main entrances. The station was demolished, 1963-1966.		c.1910	Pennsylvania Station, (bordered by 31st Street, 7th Avenue, 33rd Street and 8th Avenue), Manhattan, New York City	pink granite	10 ft (3.0 m)	Weinman's figures of Day and Night flanked the clocks over the station's 7th and 8th Avenue main entrances, and were repeated over the 31st and 33rd Street entrances. A salvaged figure of Night was donated to the Brooklyn Museum in 1966. A complete clock entablature decorates the Eagle Scout Memorial Fountain in Kansas City, Missouri. Another clock entablature (disassembled) is at Ringwood State Park in Passaic County, New Jersey.
Adolph Alexander Weinman	Civic Fame		1913	atop Manhattan Municipal Building, Centre Street at Chambers Street, Manhattan, New York City	gilded bronze	25 ft (7.6 m)	Manhattan Municipal Building:
Adolph Alexander Weinman	Descending Night atop column		1915	Fountain of the Setting Sun, Court of the Universe, Panama-Pacific International Exposition	staff		Fountain of the Setting Sun (at left):
Adolph Alexander Weinman	Goddess of Truth at base of column		1915	Fountain of the Setting Sun, Court of the Universe, Panama-Pacific International Exposition	staff		Fountain of the Setting Sun (at left):
Adolph Alexander Weinman	Walking Liberty Half Dollar		1916		90% silver 10% copper	1.203 in (30.6 mm)	Munson also may have been Weinman's model for the Mercury dime (1916).
Adolph Alexander Weinman	Daphnis and Chloe (Note: This direct claim made over Munson's name in the 5th of her 20 articles is not consistent with the declining fortunes of the Devonshire House circa World War I, nor with Weinman's exhaustive C.V., which shows no work at all outside the United States)		by 1921	Devonshire House, (prior to 1921); London, England			as Chloe
Gertrude Vanderbilt Whitney	Paganism Immortal		c.1910				
Gertrude Vanderbilt Whitney	Fountain of El Dorado		1915	Tower of Jewels Arcade, Panama-Pacific International Exposition			Whitney was awarded a PPIE bronze medal for her sculpture. "[Munson] mingles, many times over, in the crowd pressing forward toward the mysterious portal of Mrs. Harry Payne Whitney's Fountain of El Dorado."
Bruno Louis Zimm	Relief panels: The Triumph of the Arts; The Struggle for the Beautiful; The Power of the Arts		1915	Attic of Rotunda, Palace of Fine Arts, Panama-Pacific International Exposition	staff	14 ft (4.3 m)	Truth is the nude female figure at the center of The Struggle for the Beautiful.

== Filmography ==
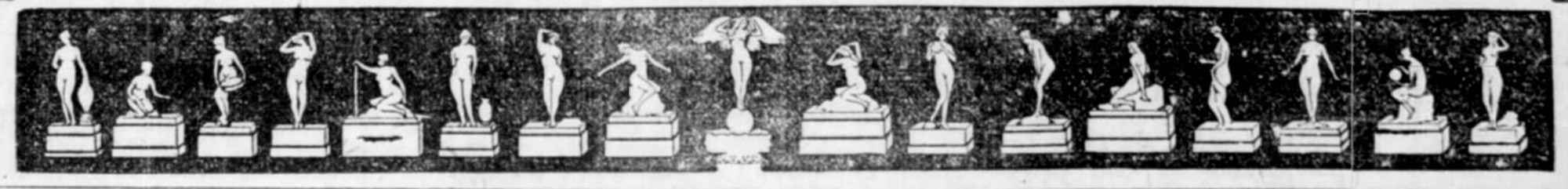
Thumbnail sketches of Munson in the poses of famous works of art, 1916 newspaper ad for Purity. Munson was the model for Karl Bitter's Pomona (3rd from left) and Adolph Alexander Weinman's Descending Night (center).

All four films in which Munson appeared were thought to have been lost, until a copy of Purity (1916) was recovered in France in 2009.

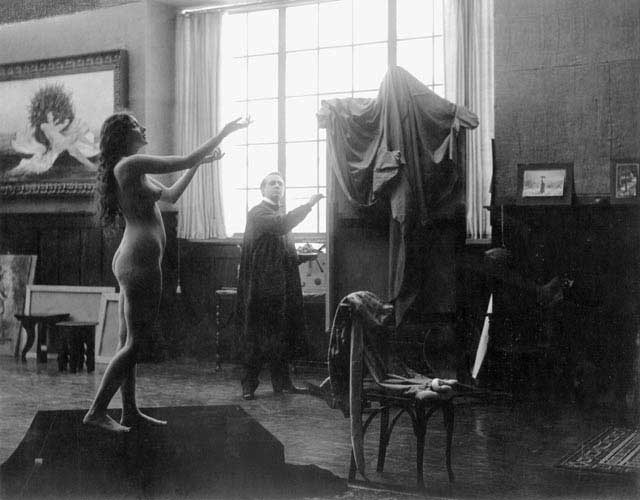
Audrey Munson and Thomas A. Curran in Inspiration (1915), her film debut

Year	Title	Role	Notes
1915	Inspiration	The Model	Reissued as The Perfect Model (1918)
1916	Purity	Purity / Virtue	
1916	The Girl o' Dreams	Norma Hansen	
1921	Heedless Moths	Audrey Munson	Based on Munson's stories and articles for Hearst's Sunday Magazine

In 2010, film director Roberto Serrini made a documentary about Munson which was featured in several news outlets including the New York Post.
