= Hettie Anderson =

American art model (1873–1938)

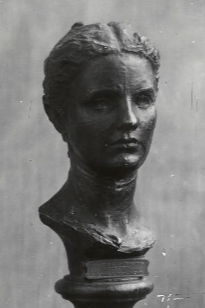
- Bust of Anderson by Augustus Saint-Gaudens
- Born: Harriette Eugenia Anderson; 1873; Columbia, South Carolina, US
- Died: January 10, 1938 (aged 64–65); New York City, US
- Occupation: Modeling

Hettie Anderson (born Harriette Eugenia Dickerson; 1873 – January 10, 1938) was an African-American art model and muse who posed for American sculptors and painters including Daniel Chester French, Augustus Saint-Gaudens, John La Farge, Anders Zorn, Bela Pratt, Adolph Alexander Weinman, and Evelyn Beatrice Longman. Among Anderson's high-profile likenesses are the winged Victory figure on the Sherman Memorial at Grand Army Plaza in Manhattan, New York City and $20 gold coins known as the Saint-Gaudens double eagle. Theodore Roosevelt deemed Victory "one of the finest figures of its kind." Saint-Gaudens described Anderson as "certainly the handsomest model I have ever seen of either sex" and considered her "Goddess-like."

== Biography ==
Anderson (sometimes listed in documents as Harriette, Harriet, and Hattie, and known to her family as Cousin Tootie) was born in 1873 in Columbia, South Carolina. Her family members were free African-Americans, listed in censuses and city directories as "colored" or "mulatto." Relatives owned real estate and worked as builders, painters, barbers, and seamstresses. Her uncle and aunt Andrew Madison Wallace and Martha Lee Wallace and their children (Andrew's parents were an Irish-born priest, James Wallace, and an enslaved woman named Mary or Sarah) had escaped to Canada during the American Civil War. During and after the Reconstruction era, family members became physicians, government workers, teachers, and civil rights activists. Her mother Caroline Lee, the daughter of a carpenter named Henry Lee and his wife Eliza, worked as a seamstress and was widowed young (her husband was named Joseph Scott, while Benjamin Dickerson is listed as Hettie's father). Caroline had two other children, Charles Dickerson (c. 1872–1936) and Sally (born c. 1867). The family lived on property they owned on Wayne Street near Taylor. (A historical marker honoring Anderson was installed at the site in April 2023.) By 1895, Hettie Anderson (it is not clear when she adopted that last name) was living in Manhattan. She trained and modeled at the Art Students League of New York and at times worked as a clerk and seamstress. She and Caroline (listed as "white" in censuses) rented an apartment at 698 Amsterdam Avenue on the Upper West Side.

Artists hired Anderson to spend weeks at a time in their city and country studios. Saint-Gaudens praised her “power of posing patiently, steadily and thoroughly in the spirit one wished.” In 1906, as his health failed and he was designing coin reliefs (his plaster full-length cast of Anderson as Victory had been destroyed in a studio fire), he told Weinman to let her know "I need her badly." She is said to have posed for Weinman's Civic Fame atop New York's Municipal Building, Edwin Blashfield's murals at the Library of Congress and John Quincy Adams Ward's winged Victory on the Dewey Arch. In 1908 she copyrighted a bronze casting of her 1897 bust portrait by Saint-Gaudens (copyright I 24585); the work's full titles include First Sketch of Head of Victory Sherman Monument. From 1908 to 1910 she lent it to a traveling Saint-Gaudens retrospective shown at the Metropolitan Museum of Art, Carnegie Institute, Corcoran Gallery, Art Institute of Chicago, and Indianapolis Museum of Art. Her refusal to give Saint-Gaudens' widow Augusta and son Homer permission to make replicas of the bust led them to leave her identity, and the object, out of official accounts of the sculptor's career aside from Homer's cryptic allusions to a model "supposed to have negro blood in her veins."

The painter and educator Kenyon Cox wrote of her winged image alongside Sherman's statue, “She has a certain fierce wildness of aspect, but her rapt gaze and half-open mouth indicate the seer of visions.” The inclusion of an African-American model on coins and a Civil War monument is said to have “caused some stir.” But for some observers of Victory, "it must have seemed especially fitting" for the figure of a Black woman "to lead the triumphant Union commander on his way." The independent researcher William E. Hagans, who was Anderson's cousin and researched her extensively, concluded that her image ranked "as the nation's most celebrated image of Liberty" surpassed only by "the French-born lady carrying the torch in New York Harbor."

She served as French's muse for works including bronze reliefs on the doors of the Boston Public Library; cemetery memorials to Rutherfurd Stuyvesant in New Jersey, Jesse Parker Williams in Atlanta, and the Melvin brothers in Concord, Massachusetts; The Spirit of Life, a memorial to the financier and philanthropist Spencer Trask in Saratoga Springs, New York; and Sculpture, a marble allegorical figure of a woman sculptor alongside the steps of the Saint Louis Art Museum (collection no. 159:1913). It is draped in classical garb, handles a mallet and chisels, and cradles two partly finished human figures emerging from a stone block. It was based on a work in staff (plaster) that French had exhibited at the 1904 Louisiana Purchase Exposition.

In the 1910s, French and Longman helped Anderson land a job as an attendant in classrooms at the Metropolitan Museum. Many of her Columbia relatives also moved to New York, including a cousin, Henry Allen Wallace, a civil servant who wrote for the Journal of Negro History. Around 1920, Anderson's mental health declined, and she left her museum job. She was still living at 698 Amsterdam at the time of her death, due to heart failure (her family's Columbia property was sold in 1937). "Model" was the profession recorded on her death certificate. Her brother's five surviving children inherited her estate. She is buried in the Lee family plot at Columbia's Elmwood Cemetery, alongside her mother, in a grave that was long unmarked. A tombstone inscribed "Here Lies the Goddess-like Miss Anderson," commissioned through a partnership of the South Carolina Numismatic Association, Midlands Coin Club and South Carolina African American Heritage Commission, was installed in June 2023 at the cemetery.

== Likenesses ==
In addition to Saint-Gaudens' portrayals of Anderson at the Sherman Monument and on $20 gold coins, reduced-size bronze versions of Victory belong to institutions including the Metropolitan Museum of Art (no. 17.90.1), Toledo Museum of Art (no. 1986.34), Carnegie Museum of Art (19.5.2), Arlington National Cemetery, and Saint-Gaudens National Historical Park in Cornish, New Hampshire.

In 1897, Anders Zorn depicted her taking a break while posing for Saint-Gaudens; etchings of the scene survive at institutions including the Art Institute of Chicago (1913.1018), Metropolitan Museum (no. 17.3.726), Isabella Stewart Gardner Museum (4.2.r.161), Boston Public Library (18_07_000126), Saint-Gaudens National Historical Park, National Portrait Gallery (NPG.73.37) and Zorn Museum in Mora, Sweden. The Smithsonian Institution owns De Witt Ward's photos (JUL J0006125 and JUL J0021700) of her Saint-Gaudens bronze bust as well as a photo of the $20 coin prototype (JUL J0021689). The bust has been shown in recent years at institutions including the Musée des Augustins in Toulouse in 1999. On November 17, 2023, it was sold for $200,000 at Heritage Auctions in Dallas. In the 1890s, Anderson posed for John La Farge while he was portraying a Greek goddess in Athens, a mural at the Bowdoin College Museum of Art's Walker Art Building. (In 1911 she paid $25 for a La Farge watercolor of a Samoan lagoon scene, whereabouts now unknown, at American Art Galleries' sale of his estate.) An oil-on-canvas bust sketch said to be a portrait of her by Daniel Chester French survives at his home, Chesterwood, in Stockbridge, Massachusetts, along with his plaster casts of her right foot and right hand.

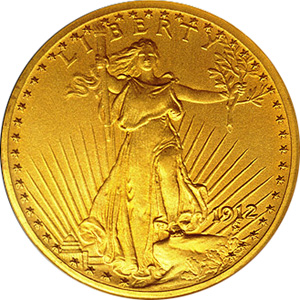

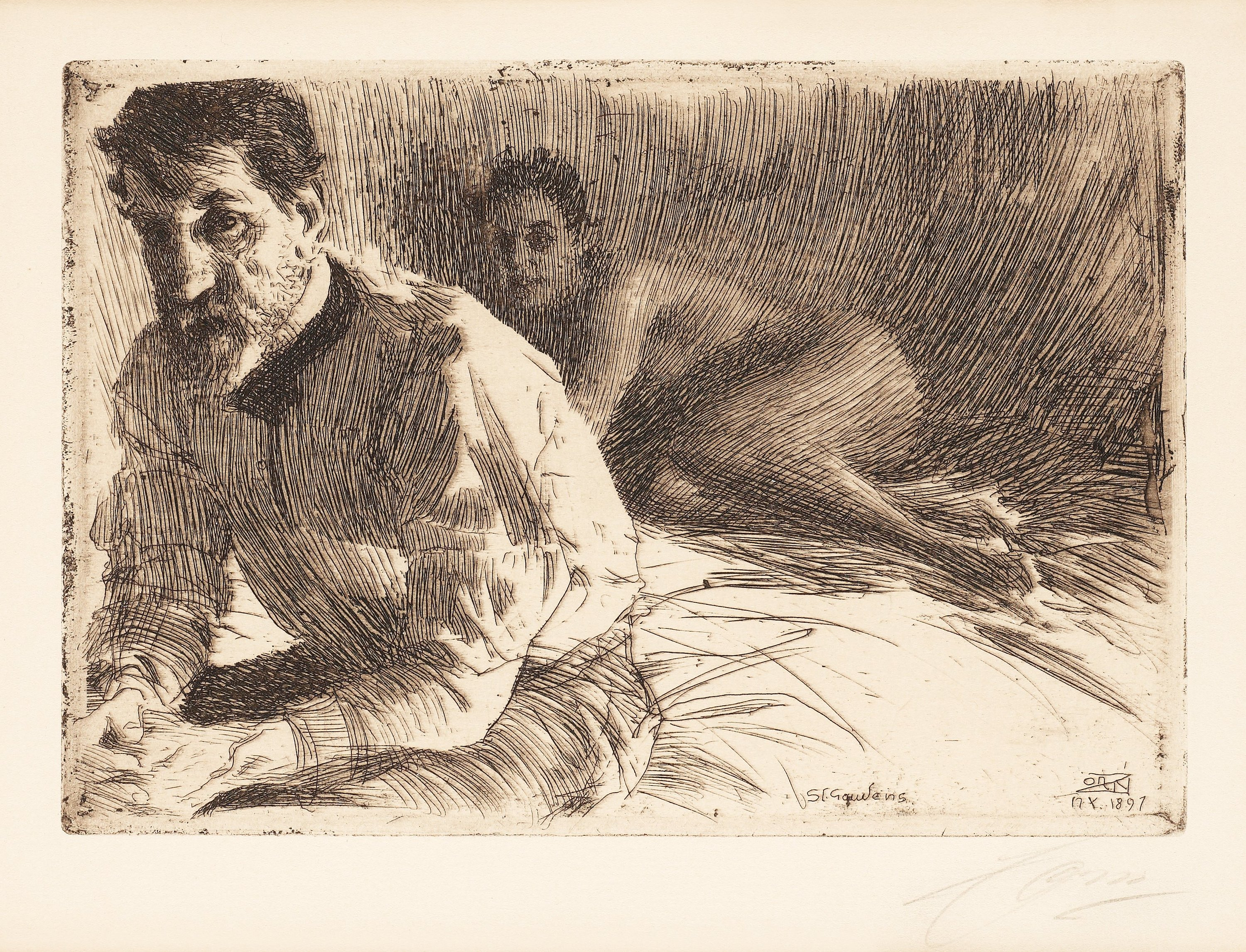
Anderson depicted behind Saint-Gaudens in an etching by Anders Zorn, 1897

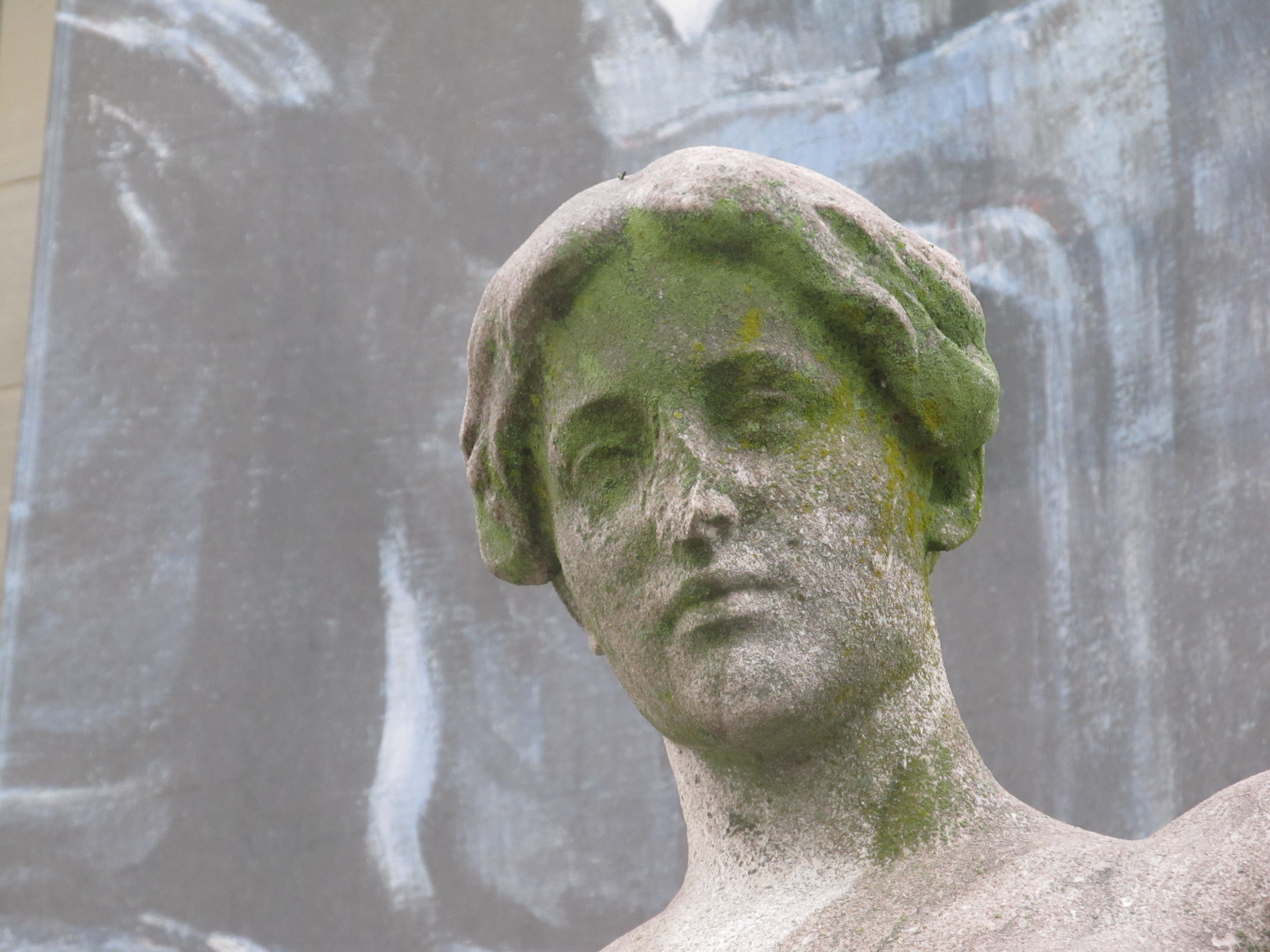
figure of Sculpture by Daniel Chester French, Saint Louis Art Museum

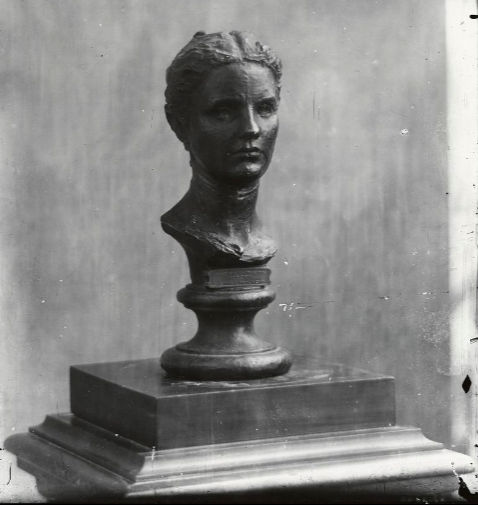
Artists' model Hettie Anderson, bust by Augustus Saint-Gaudens. Smithsonian American Art Museum, Archives and Special Collections, De Witt Ward negative acquired by Peter A. Juley & Son. Black-and-white study print (8x10). Orig. negative: 8x10, Glass, BW. JUL J0006125 siris_jul_6125

== Papers ==
Anderson's correspondence about the Saint-Gaudens bust survives at the Metropolitan Museum of Art (which also owns correspondence about her Met employment), Indianapolis Museum of Art, Dartmouth College Library (Augustus Saint-Gaudens papers, ML-4, Box 31, Folder 4), and Archives of American Art (Carnegie Institute, Museum of Art records, 1883–1962, bulk 1885-1962: Series 1: Correspondence, 1883–1962, Box 7, Folder 59).
