= Heedless Moths =

1921 film by Robert Zigler Leonard

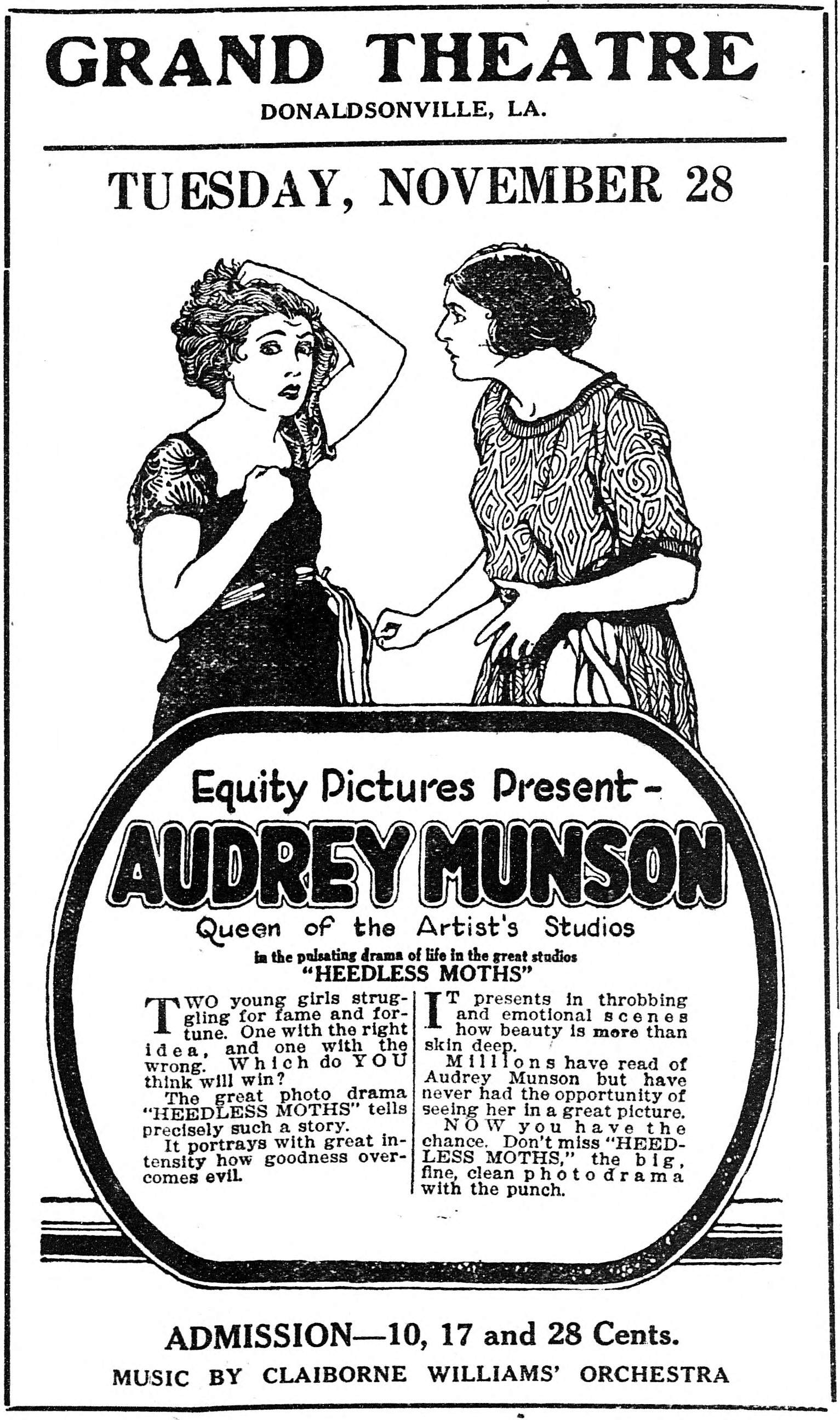
- Contemporary newspaper advertisement for the film.
- Directed by: Robert Z. Leonard
- Written by: Robert Z. Leonard
- Based on: "Studio Secrets; Life Story" by Audrey Munson
- Produced by: Alan Rock
- Starring: Jane Thomas; Holmes Herbert; Hedda Hopper; Audrey Munson; Ward Crane
- Cinematography: Hal Young
- Edited by: Joseph Farnham
- Distributed by: Equity Pictures Corporation
- Release date: June 3, 1921 (United States)
- Running time: 60 minutes
- Country: United States
- Language: Silent (English intertitles)

Heedless Moths is a 1921 American silent melodrama film written and directed by Robert Z. Leonard. The film stars Jane Thomas as real life nude model Audrey Munson. Munson appeared as herself in the nude scenes, which were posed similar to tableau vivants, and the film was based on a series of autobiographical stories she wrote. Heedless Moths also stars Holmes Herbert and Hedda Hopper.

== Plot ==
As described in a film publication, idealistic sculptor (Herbert), who has a "butterfly" wife (Hopper), is working on a nude group from life. He and his model (Munson/Thomas) fall in love, but it is not a love to be realized. In the meantime the butterfly wife has become enmeshed in the nets of a dilettante artist (Crane). One night he pulls in the nets and she finds herself in his apartment. When the model realizes the sculptor is searching for his wife, she breaks into the dilettante's apartment, hides the wife, and plays the role of the reveler, saving the marriage of the man she loves.

== Cast ==
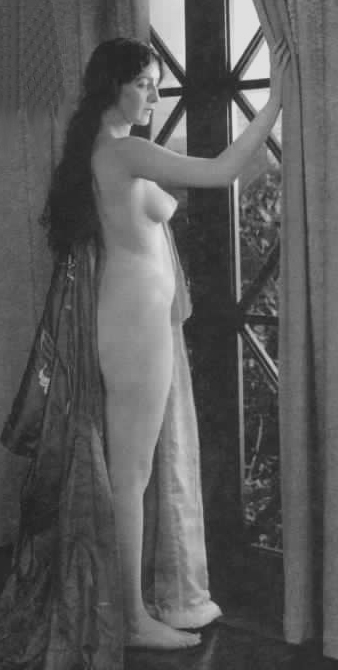
Still with nude Audrey Munson

- Jane Thomas as Audrey Munson
- Holmes Herbert as The Sculptor
- Hedda Hopper as His Wife
- Ward Crane as The Dilettante
- Tom Burrough as The Sage
- Audrey Munson as herself
- Henry Duggan as The Spirit of the Arch
- Irma Harrison as The Prey

== Production ==
The working title of the film was The Soul Within.

== Reception ==
Upon its release, Heedless Moths was generally panned by critics. The film magazine Photoplay in an editorial note recommended that the film not be seen as it would add to calls for film censorship.

Munson later sued the film's production company, Perry Plays, and producer Alan Rock for $15,000 in damages after they chose to send Jane Thomas on a tour to promote the film instead of Munson.

== Preservation ==
With no copies of Heedless Moths listed as being in any film archives, it is a lost film.
