= Four Seasons Resort The Biltmore Santa Barbara =

Hotel in Santa Barbara, California, United States

General information
- Location: Santa Barbara, California, 1260 Channel Drive
- Coordinates: 34.41696°N 119.64196°W
- Opening: 1927
- Owner: Ty Warner
- Operator: Four Seasons Hotels

Design and construction
- Architect: Reginald Davis Johnson

Other information
- Number of rooms: 206

Website
- Official website

The Four Seasons Resort The Biltmore Santa Barbara is a luxury resort hotel located in Santa Barbara, California known for its Spanish Colonial Revival architecture and gardens. It opened in 1927 as the Santa Barbara Biltmore, part of the Bowman-Biltmore Hotels chain. The hotel closed in March 2020, due to the COVID-19 pandemic. It is set to reopen in 2026, following major renovations.

== History ==
The Santa Barbara Biltmore was designed by architect Reginald Johnson and landscape architect Ralph Stevens in 1926-1927. Their design of the hotel and outdoor garden rooms synthesizes Mediterranean Revival, Spanish Colonial Revival and Moorish Revival styles of architecture. The $1,500,000 construction cost was funded by the Bowman-Biltmore Hotels Corporation of New York City, with a 5 March 1927 groundbreaking. Since its 1927 opening, the hotel has been known popularly simply as 'The Biltmore'.

Allied Properties of San Francisco bought the Biltmore in 1936. They sold the property in 1976 to Marriott for $5.25 million and the hotel was renamed Marriott's Santa Barbara Biltmore. Marriott sold the hotel to Four Seasons Hotels in 1987 for $55 million and it was renamed the Four Seasons Resort Santa Barbara. In 2000, billionaire Beanie Babies creator Ty Warner purchased the hotel for $150 million, while retaining Four Seasons as the management company. He restored the hotel at a cost of $240 million and brought back the historic 'Biltmore' name soon after, renaming the hotel the Four Seasons Resort The Biltmore Santa Barbara.

The hotel closed in March 2020, due to the COVID-19 pandemic. The hotel has remained closed, due to a dispute between Warner and the Four Seasons chain. In August 2024, it was reported that Warner intends to add a huge pool and beach area to the property, including a "lazy river waterway" and waterfall. This created conflict with the Montecito Board of Architectural Review, which felt the alterations would damage the historical character of the resort. Warner's representatives said the new pool complex was essential, because hotel guests no longer have access to Warner's adjacent Coral Casino Beach & Cabana Club. They stated that "this property cannot open without another pool complex area." In November 2024, a modified pool design was approved by the Montecito Board of Architectural Review. Work began in early 2025. In April 2025, it was announced that the hotel will have a Nobu restaurant when it reopens.

== Coral Casino ==
Coral Casino Beach and Cabana Club, built across the street in 1937, was also purchased by Warner in 2000. Guests of the Santa Barbara Biltmore had access to it until 2020.
