= Adrift (1911 film) =

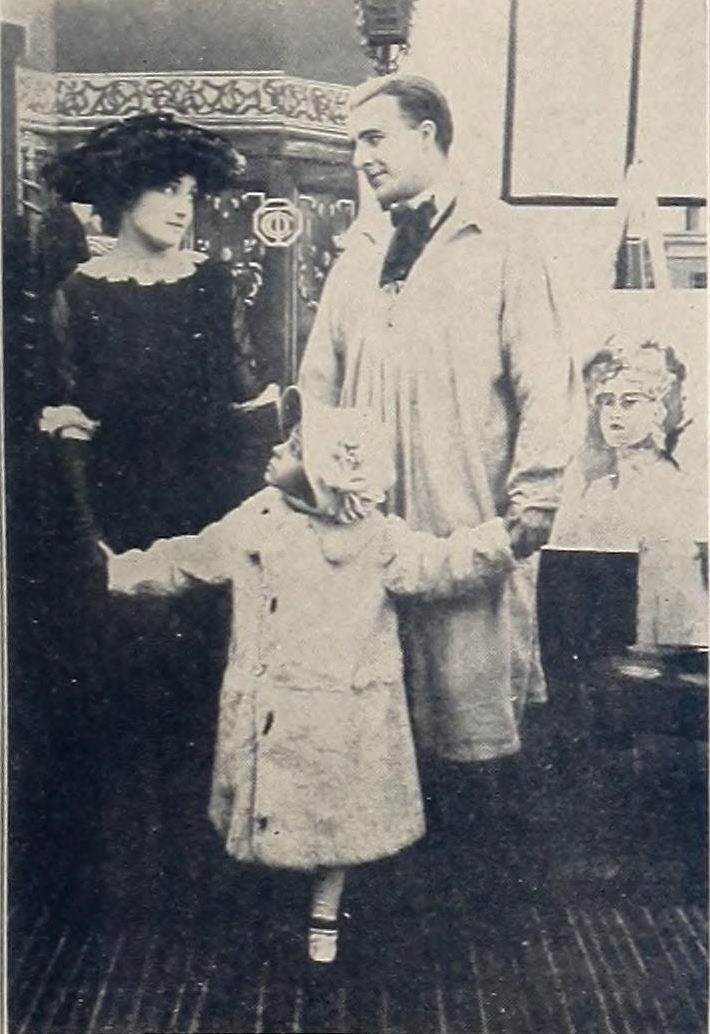
- Surviving film still
- Directed by: Lucius J. Henderson
- Produced by: Thanhouser Company
- Release date: February 3, 1911
- Running time: Unknown
- Country: United States
- Languages: Silent film English intertitles

Adrift is a 1911 American silent short drama film produced by the Thanhouser Company and directed by Lucius J. Henderson. The film depicts a story of a young artist whose lack of success leads him to attempt suicide. Before he can carry out the act, his daughter follows and stops him. He confesses to his wife and she thanks her child, providing the inspiration for the artist to complete a great painting. It brings him success and he grows distant from his wife and becomes interested in another woman whom he was commissioned by. Once again saved by his daughter's actions, whose crying moves the woman to break off the relationship with the artist. The artist destroys the painting and learns a moral lesson.

The film was advertised to the American churchgoer as a moral picture. The film was generally well received by critics, but the faults of story for the sake of a moral lesson were noted. Adrift, like all other American silents of the day, had no musical accompaniment, but a letter written into a trade publication provides a score for the drama. The film is presumed lost.

== Plot ==
An official synopsis of the film was published in The Moving Picture World states: "Jack Thorne, a young artist, finds his efforts unappreciated, and he and his wife and little daughter are on the verge of starvation. The final blow comes when his last painting, on which he had built much hope, was rejected by a rich man, whom an artist chum kindly brought to the impoverished studio. Jack decides that he can struggle no longer. Unseen by his wife, he picks up his revolver, puts it in his pocket and goes out, intending to end everything. But his little daughter has watched him; she follows him and stays his hand. Her prayers and entreaties bring him to a realization of what his rash act would mean to the two helpless ones that would be left behind. Penitent and remorseful, he accompanies his child back to their poor home. There he confesses to his wife that it was only the child's timely interference that saved him from ending it all. The mother drops on her knees beside her child, and clasping her in her arms, raises grateful eyes to Heaven in a prayer of thankfulness. Jack, looking up suddenly, sees the beautiful group of mother and child, with a light as if from Heaven upon them. Realizing that [this] is the inspiration and subject for which he has sought in vain, he calls for them not to move, and at once begins his great painting of them, which brings him fame and wealth."

"But with wealth, the artist becomes dissatisfied with his wife, and is infatuated with a beautiful society woman whose portrait he is painting. The couple, happy in poverty, are now rapidly drifting on the shoals of matrimonial disaster, but the child saves them. She is weeping one day when Miss Brent, the society woman, enters the room. Miss Brent, who has never seen the child before, asks the cause of her sorrow, and tries to comfort her. The child tells her, and Julia's heart is touched. Though she has contempt[u]ously ignored the wife, she feels that she cannot ruin the life of the helpless child, even to win the artist's love. On the spur of the moment, she writes a farewell note to Jack, and gives it to the child, saying that it will cure all her sorrow. Then she goes out of their lives forever. Jack realizes, when he sees that his child is the messenger, why Julia has broken with him. An outsider had made a sacrifice to save the future of little Marie, when he, her father, who had always loved her, had selfishly forgotten his duty. Remorsefully, he tears up the letter, and destroys the painting, not angrily, but as a symbol that he had cast the original out of his life. Then he makes peace with his wife and daughter, who are joyfully ready to forgive, and tells them that their love will keep him [on] the right path for the rest of his life, and that the lesson he has been taught will never be forgotten."

== Cast ==
- William Garwood as the artist
- Lucille Younge as the artist's wife
- Marie Eline as the young daughter
- Katherine Horn as the society woman

== Production ==
The single reel drama was directed by Lucius J. Henderson. Henderson was an important director at the Thanhouser Company who began directing in the late autumn of 1910. It is unknown how many film's Henderson directed prior to the release of Adrift, but one prior credit When Love Was Blind was released two weeks prior, on January 24, 1911. The New York Dramatic Mirror on February 4, 1914, stated that Henderson had directed about 150 one and two reel dramas for the Thanhouser Company.

=== Musical accompaniment ===
Musical accompaniment for the silent films were not provided by the studios, and the Thanhouser productions were no exception. The musical program for the screenings were decided and played by the individual accompanists. At times, musical accompaniments were shared in trade journals and the musical accompaniment for Adrift was provided by an unnamed writer from Oklahoma in The Moving Picture World. The suggestion was to begin with a waltz until the friend pats the artist on the shoulder, when All I Get is Sympathy is played. The suggestion for I Don't Know Where I'm Going completes the scene and Life's A Funny Proposition follows the artist packing up until the artist pulls out the gun. A soft hurry follows as the girl confronts her father, leading to a crescendo at the climax.

Then the accompanist returns to Life's A Funny Proposition until the father is sitting down in the house. What's the Use of Dreaming leads to Gee, But It's Great to Meet a Friend with the arrival of a friend. A waltz accompanies the gallery scene until the picture is shown, leading to Some Day When Dreams Come True as the artist becomes famous. The introduction with the society woman is accompanied by How Do You Do Miss Josephine and then by So Long Mary as she exits. No Place Like Home begins the next scene until the wife recognizes the emotional distancing of her husband when All I Ask is Love is played. The studio scene begins with I Love My Wife, But Oh You Kid and leads to Be Sweet to Me Kid or Next to your Mother... with Nobody's Little Girl during the crying scene.

The unnamed accompanist was using a range of works and shortened some titles in the letter, but these works are identifiable. They include:

- All I Get Is Sympathy (circa 1906) by Irving Berlin
- I Don't Know Where I'm Going, But I'm on My Way (1906) by Arthur Collins
- Life's a Funny Proposition After All (1904) by George M. Cohan
- Gee, But It's Great To Meet a Friend From Your Home Town (1910) by William Tracey and Jas. McGavisk
- What's the Use of Dreaming (1907) by Irving Gillette
- How Do You Do Miss Josephine (1909) by Collins & Harlan
- No Place Like Home may be a reference to Home! Sweet Home! (1823) by Henry Bishop or There's No Place Like Home (1902) by Byron G. Harlan
- So Long Mary (1905) by George M. Cohan
- All That I Ask of You is Love (1910) by Edgar Selden and Herbert Ingraham
- I Love I Love I Love My Wife (But Oh! You Kid!) (1909) by Jimmy Lucas and Harry Von Tilzer
- Be Sweet To Me Kid (1907) by Joseph Howard
- Next to Your Mother, Who do you Love? (1909) by Irving Berlin
- Nobody's Little Girl (1907) by Jack Drislane and Theodore Morse

== Release and reception ==
The Thanhouser Company released Adrift on February 3, 1911. The film was advertised as being of a moral picture and targeted towards the American churchgoer as an example of a film that would change the views of the demographic towards film productions in general. The Thanhouser advertisement in the Moving Picture News said "[Adrift] is a useful film with a big, simple moral that would do much to reconcile the Church to the Motion Picture — if the former knew that this sort of film was so much in evidence." It saw a wide release across the United States, with showings in Pennsylvania, Indiana, Missouri, Kansas, and New Hampshire. One of the last advertisements for the film's showing was in September 1913.

The film was positively reviewed by critics, but contained within the reviews were often criticism on the execution of the story and plot. A review in The Moving Picture World was positive to the moral lesson the film asserted and found the acting to be satisfactory. Walton of The Moving Picture News criticized the type of film as invoking sudden and unnatural changes in character for the sake of a moral lesson. The child's influence and ability to bring sense to her father was seen as cheap theatrics, but ended with the assertion that the film was not second rate for employing such theatrics. The New York Dramatic Mirror was positive, but said that the scene upon which the little girl follows her father was not believable because she was unaware of her father's intentions to kill himself. The film is presumed lost.
