= The Vote That Counted =

- Produced by: Thanhouser Company
- Distributed by: Motion Picture Distributing and Sales Company
- Release date: January 13, 1911
- Country: United States
- Languages: Silent film English intertitles

The Vote That Counted is a 1911 American silent short drama film produced by the Thanhouser Company. The film focuses on a state senator who disappears from a train and detective Violet Gray investigates the case. Gray manages to find that he was kidnapped and that it was done because he opposed a powerful lobby. She manages to free the state senator in time for him to cast the deciding vote to defeat the lobby. The film was released on January 13, 1911, it was the second of four films in the "Violet Gray, Detective" series. The film received favorable reviews from Billboard and The New York Dramatic Mirror. The film is presumed lost.

== Plot ==
The Moving Picture World synopsis states, "State Senator Jack Dare, one of the reform members of the legislature, starts to the state capitol to attend an important session of that body. That he took the midnight train from his home city is clearly proven, for his aged mother was a passenger on it, and besides the conductor and porter are certain that he retired for the night. In the morning, however, his berth is empty, although some of his garments are found there. The case puzzles the railroad officials and the police, and Violet Gray is given a chance to distinguish herself. She learns from the conductor and porter, who had happened to spend the night awake at opposite ends of the car, that the senator did not go by them. Consequently this leaves only the window as his means of egress, and she knows that he must have gone that way. Violet discovers that Dare is a hearty supporter of a bill that a powerful lobby is trying to defeat. The fight is so close that his is the deciding vote. Dare cannot be bribed, so his opponents spirited him away in a novel fashion. But the girl finds where he is hidden and brings him back, although he is much injured. He reaches his seat in time to cast the needed vote, and to astound and defeat the lobby."

== Cast and production ==
The only known credit in the cast is Julia M. Taylor as Violet Gray. Film historian Q. David Bowers does not cite any scenario or directorial credits. At this time the Thanhouser company operated out of their studio in New Rochelle, New York. In October 1910, an article in The Moving Picture World described the improvements to the studio as having permanently installed a lighting arrangement that was previously experimental in nature. The studio had amassed a collection of props for the productions and dressing rooms had been constructed for the actors. The studio had installed new equipment in the laboratories to improve the quality of the films. By 1911, the Thanhouser company was recognized as one of leading Independent film makers, but Carl Laemmle's Independent Moving Picture Company (IMP) captured most of the publicity. Two production companies were maintained by the company, the first under Barry O'Neil and the second under Lucius J. Henderson and John Noble, an assistant director to Henderson. Though the company had at least two Bianchi cameras from Columbia Phonograph Company, it is believed that imported cameras were also used. The Bianchi cameras were unreliable and inferior to competitors, but it was believed to be a non-infringing camera, though with "rare fortune" it could shoot up to 200 feet of film before requiring repairs.

== Release and reception ==
The single reel drama, approximately 1,000 feet long, was released on January 13, 1911. This would be billed as the second in the series following the successful Love And Law film. The two later releases would be The Norwood Necklace and The Court's Decree would conclude the "Violet Gray, Detective" series. Apparently the film series made an impact because the Lubin Manufacturing Company released a film under the title Violet Dare, Detective in June 1913. The film received a positive review from The Billboard for its interest plot, good acting and photography. The New York Dramatic Mirror found the film to be a good melodrama, but found fault in that a woman detective was used to resolve the case when the part would have had more dignity and realism if the case was resolved by a man. The film would be shown in Pennsylvania and be advertised by theaters even a year after its release.
