= When Love Was Blind =

When Love Was Blind refers to the following films:

- When Love Was Blind (1911 film)
- When Love Was Blind (1917 film)
