= Love and Law =

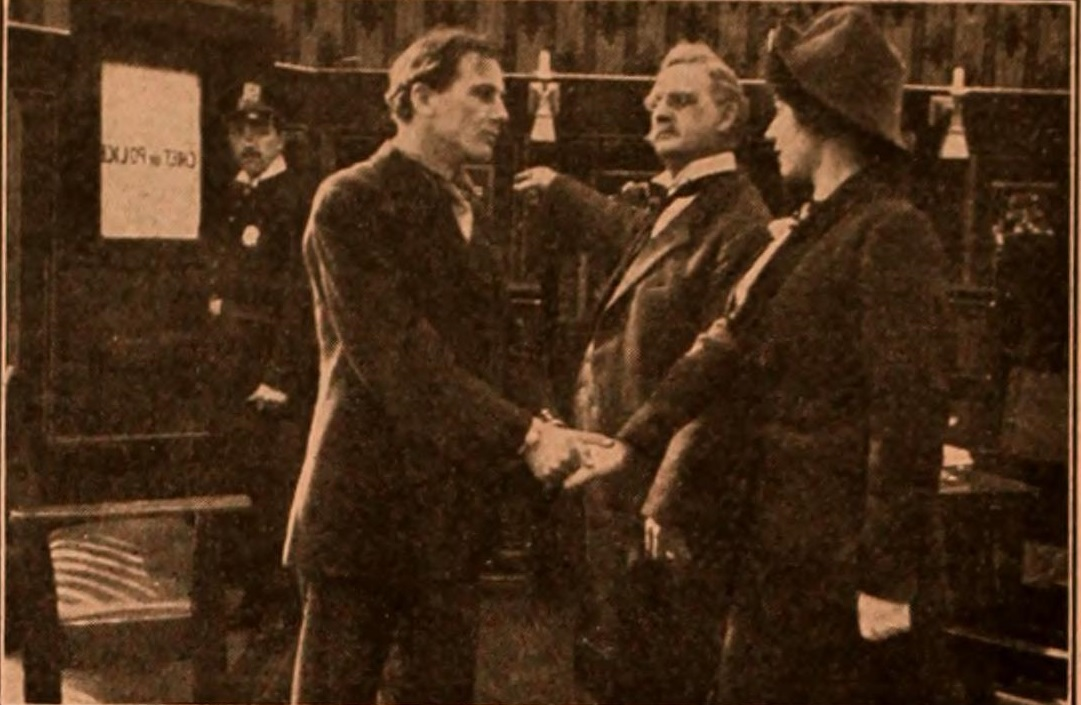
- A surviving film still
- Produced by: Thanhouser Company
- Distributed by: Motion Picture Distributing and Sales Company
- Release date: December 13, 1910
- Country: United States
- Languages: Silent film English intertitles

Love and Law is a 1910 American silent short drama produced by the Thanhouser Company. The film begins with a meeting between Tom Egan and Sue Jennings. Sue asks Tom, who had previously been sweethearts, for each others' love letters because she will soon marry another man. On this same night, Jack Deming confronts Tom in a drunken state and brandishing a revolver. Jack seeks vengeance because was put into financial ruin by Tom's speculative advice, but Tom manages to calm him down. Tom pens a letter to Sue and takes his own life, making it appear as if Jack murdered him. Jack is arrested, but a young detective named Violet Gray proves his innocence. Jack and Violet also fall in love. The role of Violet Gray was played by Julia M. Taylor, but the other roles and staff credits are unknown. The film was released on December 13, 1910, it would be the first of four films in the "Violet Gray, Detective" series. The film is presumed lost.

== Plot ==
Though the film is presumed lost, a synopsis survives in The Moving Picture World from December 17, 1910. It states: "Sue Jennings and Tom Egan have been sweethearts, Sue decides to marry another man, and holds a secret meeting with Tom, in which she returns his love letters and demands her own. On the same night, Jack Deming, a friend of Tom's who has lost heavily in speculation on Tom's advice, calls at the latter's rooms, very much intoxicated, brandishing a revolver and vowing vengeance. Tom calms his excited visitor, who falls asleep on the couch, after which Tom writes a letter to his former sweetheart and dispatches it by his servant. When the servant returns, he discovers his master dead on the floor of his apartment and Jack just leaving the room revolver in hand. Jack is arrested on suspicion, and young Miss Marsh [sic], a bright young woman in the detective department, is detailed from headquarters to investigate the case. She does some clever work in the case, and proves Jack's innocence in a novel way, incidentally falling in love with the man whose life she is working to save. On the strength of her evidence, Jack is set free; and with love to live for, he starts out to make a new record in life for himself."

== Production ==
The writer of the scenario is unknown, but it was most likely Lloyd Lonergan. He was an experienced newspaperman employed by The New York Evening World while writing scripts for the Thanhouser productions. The film director is unknown, but it may have been Barry O'Neil or Lucius J. Henderson. Cameramen employed by the company during this era included Blair Smith, Carl Louis Gregory, and Alfred H. Moses, Jr. though none are specifically credited. The role of the cameraman was uncredited in 1910 productions. The only known cast credit is for Julia M. Taylor as Violet Gray. The other cast credits are unknown, but many 1910 Thanhouser productions are fragmentary. In late 1910, the Thanhouser company released a list of the important personalities in their films. The list includes G.W. Abbe, Justus D. Barnes, Frank H. Crane, Irene Crane, Marie Eline, Violet Heming, Martin J. Faust, Thomas Fortune, George Middleton, Grace Moore, John W. Noble, Anna Rosemond, Mrs. George Walters.

== Release and reception ==
The single reel drama, approximately 1,000 feet long, was released on December 6, 1910. According to Bowers, the film would also be known as Love and the Law in some instances. (Note: This might have been in confusion to a similar title Love and the Law from the Edison Manufacturing Company, also of 1910.) Originally the film was advertised as "Another subject of the Thanhouser Detective Series" without specifically highlighting the character role of Violet Gray. It is unsure if the film was referring to The Girl Reporter or A Dainty Politician as part of a detective series. The film would later be billed as part of the "Violet Gray, Detective" series, consisting of this film, The Vote That Counted, The Norwood Necklace, and The Court's Decree. The film likely had a wide national release, advertising theaters are known in Indiana and Pennsylvania. The Lubin Manufacturing Company would make a film with a reference to the series with Violet Dare, Detective in June 1913.

The film received mixed reviews by The Moving Picture World and The New York Dramatic Mirror. The reviewer for the World stated, "A detective story in which a woman discovers the innocence of a ne'er-do-well charged with murder and determines to marry him after he is reformed. That is the whole story, but in the working out many interesting situations are developed, particularly where she proves the innocence the accused man in a novel manner. In all respects the film is up to the Thanhouser standard and should not fail to interest a large number of people." The Mirror went more in-depth into the plot by stating that Tom commits suicide with the intention of placing the blame of his death on Jack. When Jack is arrested for murder, Violet Gray finds a clue in the button from the bride's dress. She approaches the bride and learns of the suicide letter written by Tom. With the evidence that it was a suicide and not a murder, Grey manages to clear Jack of any wrongdoing at the police court. The reviewer stated, "The lead did not sustain the seriousness of the theme, and the improbable succession of incidents failed to be convincing."

== See also ==
- Checkmate – another Thanhouser film dealing with circumstantial evidence
- The Sinner – another Thanhouser film dealing with circumstantial evidence

== See also ==
- List of American films of 1910
