= Galloping Thunder =

Galloping Thunder may refer to:

- Galloping Thunder (1927 film), a silent western film directed by Scott Pembroke
- Galloping Thunder (1946 film), a western film directed by Ray Nazarro
