= The House of Shame (disambiguation) =

The House of Shame is a 1928 silent film by Burton L. King. The phrase may also refer to:

- The House of Shame, a 1938 film by Max Neufeld
- "The House of Shame", a song by Lacuna Coil from the 2016 album Delirium
