= Madeline and Marion Fairbanks =

American actresses

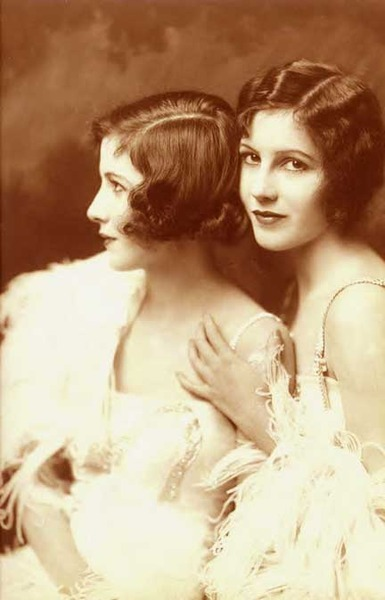
The Fairbanks twins, Madeline and Marion Fairbanks

Madeline (Madeleine) (November 15, 1900 – January 15, 1989) and her twin sister Marion Fairbanks (November 15, 1900 – September 20, 1973), known variously as the Fairbanks Twins and Thanhouser Twins, were American stage and motion picture actresses active in the silent era.

== Early life ==
Born in New York City, the twins were mainly educated by private tutors at home and while traveling. Their mother was actress Jennie M. Fairbanks, a.k.a. Jane Fairbanks, and their father was the son of Nathaniel Fairbanks, who served in the American Civil War, and a descendant of Jonathan Fairbanks, a Massachusetts hero of the Revolution. Madeline and Marion had an older brother, Robert.

== Career ==
The Fairbanks twins began their stage career in The Bluebird at the New Theatre in New York, NY.

They then appeared on Broadway in The Piper (1911), Mrs. Wiggs of the Cabbage Patch (1912) and Snow White (1912). As the Thanhouser Kids they appeared in films such as Cousins (1913), The Flying Twins (1915), The Bird of Prey (1916), and The Answer (1916); on Broadway, they in the Ziegfeld Follies (1917–20), Mercenary Mary (1925), Oh, Kay! (1926), Allez-Oop (1927) and Happy (1927); Marion appeared solo in Grab Bag (1924) and on a tour of Little Nellie Kelly. Madeline performed solo in The Ritz Revue in (1924).

They entered films with Biograph the Thanhouser Film Corporation in 1912, where they were billed as "The Thanhouser Twins", and remained there until 1916. The Fairbanks sisters appeared in the Ziegfeld Follies of 1918 and 1919, as well as the Ziegfeld Midnight Frolic in 1918 and Ziegfeld 9 O'clock Frolic in 1921.

== Later years ==
By 1932, Marion was on stage separately at the Waldorf Theatre, New York City. She succeeded Eleanor King as leading lady in Whistling in the Dark. 1930s news accounts reported that she operated a beauty parlor and directed a branch of a cosmetics manufacturer. In her later years she knew much unhappiness and struggled with the temptations of alcohol.

== Deaths ==
Marion Fairbanks died in Georgia in 1973 and was buried at Westview Cemetery. Her name was then Marion Fairbanks Delph. She had no survivors other than her sister. Madeline married Leonard Sherman in 1937. The union ended in divorce in 1947. She lived in New York until early 1989, where she died of respiratory failure.

== Work ==
=== Stage ===
Date	Stageplay	Performing
1912	Snow White and the Seven Dwarfs	Madeline & Marion
1916	The Century Girl	Madeline & Marion
1917	Ziegfeld Follies of 1917	Madeline & Marion
1918	Ziegfeld Follies of 1918	Madeline & Marion
1919	Ziegfeld Follies of 1919	Madeline & Marion
1921	Ziegfeld 9 O'clock Frolic	Madeline & Marion
1921	Two Little Girls in Blue	Madeline & Marion
1924	Hassard Short's Ritz Revue	Madeline
1924	The Grab Bag	Marion
1925	Mercenary Mary	Madeline
1926	Oh, Kay!	Madeline & Marion
1927	Allez-oop	Madeline
1928	Happy	Madeline

=== Film ===
Date	Movie	Acting
1912	The Twins	Madeline & Marion
1912	Cousins	Madeline & Marion
1912	As Others See Us	Madeline & Marion
1912	The Little Girl Next Door	Madeline & Marion
1913	An Unfair Exchange	Madeline & Marion
1913	Life's Pathway	Madeline & Marion
1913	The Twins and the Other Girl	Madeline & Marion
1913	The Children's Hour	Madeline & Marion
1913	Their Great Big Beautiful Doll	Madeline & Marion
1913	Uncle's Namesakes	Madeline & Marion
1913	Lawyer, Dog and Baby	Madeline & Marion
1913	Jack and the Beanstalk	Madeline & Marion
1914	Twins and a Stepmother	Madeline & Marion
1914	Guilty or Not Guilty	Madeline
1914	The Tin Soldier and the Dolls	Madeline & Marion
1914	Beating Back	Madeline
1914	In Her Sleep	Madeline
1914	The Legend of Snow White	Marion
1914	The Girl Across the Hall	Marion
1914	The Million Dollar Mystery	Madeline & Marion
1914	The Widow's Mite	Madeline & Marion
1914	The Pendulum of Fate	Madeline & Marion
1914	In Peril's Path	Madeline & Marion
1914	In Danger's Hour	Madeline & Marion
1914	The Benevolence of Conductor 786	Madeline & Marion
1914	Left in the Train	Madeline & Marion
1914	Shep's Race with Death	Madeline & Marion
1914	Pawns of Fate	Madeline & Marion
1914	Shadows and Sunshine	Madeline & Marion
1914	A Hatful of Trouble	Marion
1915	When Fate Rebelled	Madeline & Marion
1915	$1,000 Reward	Madeline & Marion
1915	Their One Love	Madeline & Marion
1915	Fairy Fern Seed	Madeline & Marion
1915	Through Edith's Looking Glass	Marion
1915	Which Shall It Be?	Madeline & Marion
1915	The Flying Twins	Madeline & Marion
1915	The Twins of the G.L. Ranch	Madeline & Marion
1915	An Innocent Traitor	Madeline & Marion
1915	The Baby and the Boss	Marion
1916	Bubbles in the Glass	Madeline
1916	The Burglars' Picnic	Madeline & Marion
1916	A Bird of Prey	Madeline
1916	The Answer	Madeline & Marion
1916	The Heart of a Doll	Madeline & Marion
1922	The Beauty Shop	Madeline & Marion
1929	On with the Show!	Madeline & Marion
