= Jack Harvey (director) =

American actor and film director (1881–1954)

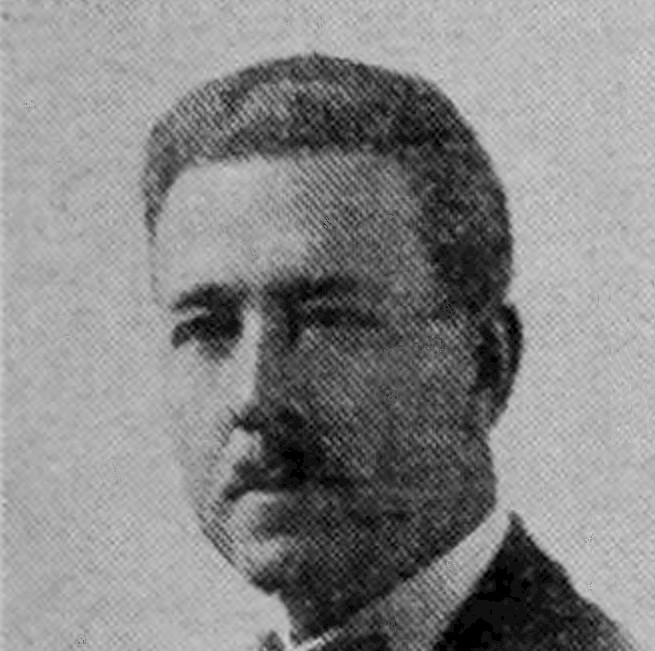
- Harvey in 1922
- Born: John Joseph Harvey; September 16, 1881; Cleveland, Ohio, U.S.
- Died: November 9, 1954 (aged 73); Los Angeles, California, U.S.
- Occupations: Actor; director; screenwriter
- Years active: 1911–1953
- Spouse: Beulah Susan Riley (m. 1942)

Jack Harvey (born John Joseph Harvey; September 16, 1881 – November 9, 1954) was an American film actor, director and screenwriter, noted for his short films of the silent period.

Among his directed films are A Dog's Love (1914) (the first of many collaborations with Shep, a well-trained Collie of the Thanhouser Company), When Fate Rebelled (1915), Fairy Fern Seed (1915), Kaiser's Finish (1918) and his last film No Babies Wanted (1928), accredited as John J. Harvey. He continued to act, but most of his roles after the 1920s were very minor and uncredited in films such as Cardinal Richelieu (1935) and Anchors Aweigh (1945). He also continued to write for films until his death in 1954, the last of which was City Beneath the Sea (1953).

== Filmography ==
=== As actor ===
- 1911 : The Willow Tree : Tom
- 1911 : The Lighthouse Keeper : Tom Atkins
- 1913 : Buttercups
- 1913 : Their Mutual Friend
- 1913 : Love's Sunset
- 1913 : The Ancient Order of Good Fellows
- 1913 : The Golf Game and the Bonnet
- 1914 : Bunny's Mistake
- 1914 : Love's Old Dream
- 1914 : Bunny's Birthday
- 1914 : Children of the Feud
- 1914 : A Change in Baggage Checks
- 1914 : The Chicken Inspector
- 1914 : Her Great Scoop
- 1914 : Bunco Bill's Visit
- 1914 : The Old Fire Horse and the New Fire Chief
- 1914 : Mr. Bunny in Disguise
- 1914 : Miser Murray's Wedding Present
- 1914 : Bunny Buys a Harem
- 1914 : Mr. Bunnyhug Buys a Hat for His Bride
- 1914 : Fogg's Millions
- 1914 : Mr. Bingle's Melodrama
- 1914 : Bread Upon the Waters
- 1914 : The Reward of Thrift
- 1927 : The Devil Dancer
- 1930 : Lord Byron of Broadway : Undetermined Role
- 1931 : Pueblo Terror : John Weston
- 1931 : Headin' for Trouble : Henchman Windy
- 1932 : Riders of the Golden Gulch
- 1935 : Cardinal Richelieu : Brugnon
- 1937 : Life Begins with Love : Director
- 1938 : The Spider's Web : Marvin

=== As director ===
- 1914 : A Dog's Love
- 1914 : Shep's Race with Death
- 1914 : The Center of the Web
- 1914 : The Barrier of Flames
- 1914: The White Rose
- 1915 : When Fate Rebelled
- 1915 : Shep the Sentinel
- 1915 : Check No. 130
- 1915: $1,000 Reward
- 1915 : A Newspaper Nemesis
- 1915: The Stolen Jewels
- 1915: The Skinflint
- 1915: The Undertow
- 1915 : Their One Love
- 1915 : Fairy Fern Seed
- 1915 : The Patriot and the Spy
- 1915 : His Guardian Auto
- 1915 : The Flying Twins
- 1915: Mercy on a Crutch
- 1915: A Message Through Flames
- 1915 : The Wolf of Debt
- 1915 : The Unnecessary Sex
- 1915 : Getting His Goat
- 1916 : The Lords of High Decision
- 1916 : The Doll Doctor
- 1916 : Held for Damages
- 1917 : When Thieves Fall Out
- 1918 : Kaiser's Finish
- 1920 : The Night of the Dub
- 1922 : The Woman Who Believed
- 1925 : Getting 'Em Right
- 1925 : The Right Man
- 1928 : No Babies Wanted

=== As screenwriter ===
- 1915 : When Fate Rebelled
- 1918 : Kaiser's Finish
- 1934 : Strictly Dynamite
- 1948 : Unknown Island
- 1948 : Last of the Wild Horses
- 1949 : Grand Canyon
- 1953 : City Beneath the Sea
