= A Message Through Flames =

- Directed by: Jack Harvey
- Starring: Mignon Anderson, Carey L. Hastings, and Bert Delaney
- Production company: Thanhouser Company
- Release date: August 10, 1915
- Country: USA
- Language: Silent

A Message Through Flames is a 1915 American short silent drama film, directed by Jack Harvey for the Thanhouser Company. It stars Mignon Anderson, Carey L. Hastings, and Bert Delaney.
