= The Little Girl Next Door =

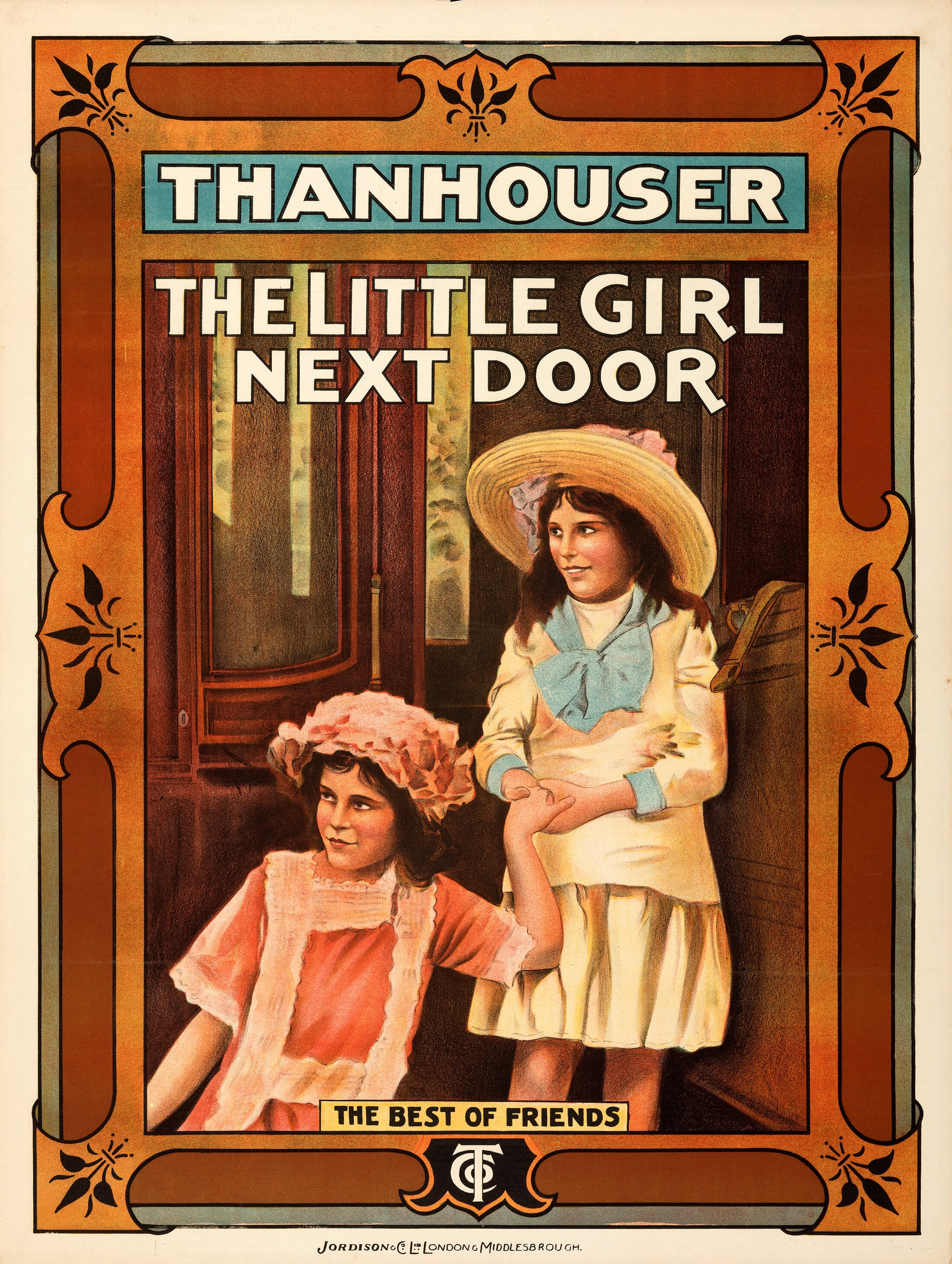
- Theatrical poster to The Little Girl Next Door
- Directed by: Lucius J. Henderson
- Written by: Philip Lonergan
- Produced by: Thanhouser Company
- Starring: William Garwood; Marguerite Snow; Marion Fairbanks; Madeline Fairbanks; William Russell
- Distributed by: Film Supply Company
- Release date: November 1, 1912
- Running time: 14 minutes
- Country: United States
- Language: Silent (English intertitles)

The Little Girl Next Door is a 1912 American silent short drama film directed by Lucius Henderson and written by Philip Lonergan. The film starred William Garwood and Marguerite Snow in the lead roles. Prints of the film are in the Library of Congress and other collections.

== Cast ==
- William Garwood as The Husband
- Marguerite Snow as The Wife
- Marion Fairbanks as Helen Randall
- Madeline Fairbanks as Ruth Foster
- William Russell as The Other Father
