= Kaiser's Finish =

- Directed by: John Josseph Harvey
- Story by: John Joseph Harvey; Clifford P. Saum
- Produced by: Sam Warner
- Starring: Earl Schenck, Claire Whitney, and Percy Standing
- Cinematography: Rial Schellinger
- Edited by: William Nigh
- Production company: Warner Bros. Pictures
- Distributed by: State Rights; Warner Bros. Pictures
- Release date: November 2, 1918
- Running time: 6–8 reels
- Country: United States
- Language: Silent

Kaiser's Finish is a 1918 American silent World War I drama film, directed by John Joseph Harvey. It stars Earl Schenck, Claire Whitney, and Percy Standing. The film contained newsreel footage of Kaiser Wilhelm and the Crown Prince Wilhelm as well as actual warfare scenes.

== Plot ==
In pre-World War I Germany, Kaiser Wilhelm (Louis Dean) fathers a number of illegitimate children and sends them to various parts of the world to be reared by his loyal agents. Under the guardianship of Dr. Carl Von Strumpf (Fred G. Hearn), one of these children, Robert Busch (Earl Schenck), grows up believing that he is the son of wealthy German-American Richard Busch (Percy Standing), but in reality, Strumpf and Busch are servants of the Kaiser. When the United States declares war on Germany, Robert expresses his earnest desire to enlist in the American army, much to the delight of his patriotic sister Emily (Claire Whitney). Before he can do so, however, Strumpf tells Robert the secret of his parentage, believing that the young man now will be eager to fight for Germany's cause. Robert feigns enthusiasm but secretly offers his services to the U.S. government, and with the passport provided him by the Pan-German league, he goes to Germany and kills the crown prince (also played by Schenck). Next, he shoots the Kaiser and blows up the entire palace, thus sacrificing his life for the principles of democracy.

== Cast ==
- Earl Schenck as Robert Busch/Crown Prince
- Claire Whitney as Emily Busch
- Percy Standing as Richard Busch
- Louis Dean as The Kaiser
- John Sunderland as Lt. Patin
- Fred G. Hearn as Carl Von Strumpf
- Charles T. Parr as Lewis Keene
- Philip Van Loan as a Blue Devil
- Billie Wagner as little French girl
- Vic De Linsky as butler

== Preservation status ==
This film is now lost, as no copies are known to exist. In the late 1940s and 1950s, Warner Bros. destroyed many of its negatives due to nitrate film decomposition. Studio records indicate that the negative of filmography pre-1931 was marked "Junked 12/27/48" (December 27, 1948). No copies of Kaiser's Finish are known to exist.
