= The Oklahoma Kid (1929 film) =

1929 film directed by J. P. McGowan

- Directed by: J. P. McGowan
- Written by: Sally Winters; Walter Sterret; William Stratton
- Produced by: J. P. McGowan
- Starring: Bob Custer; Vivian Bay; Henry Roquemore
- Cinematography: Hap Depew
- Edited by: Arthur A. Brooks
- Production company: J. P. McGowan Productions
- Distributed by: Syndicate Film Exchange
- Release date: November 1, 1929
- Running time: 50 minutes
- Country: United States
- Languages: Silent; English intertitles

The Oklahoma Kid is a 1929 American silent Western film directed by J. P. McGowan and starring Bob Custer, Vivian Bay and Henry Roquemore. It was produced as a second feature for release by the independent Poverty Row company Syndicate Film Exchange.

== Synopsis ==
The Kid is sent from Oklahoma to New Mexico to collect a consignment of cattle, where he counters a gang of outlaws.

== Cast ==
- Bob Custer as Bob, the Oklahoma Kid
- Vivian Bay as Grace Standing
- J. P. McGowan as Gang Leader Petty
- Tom Bay as Pete Gibbs
- Henry Roquemore as Mr Standing
- Walter Patterson as Henchman

== Bibliography ==
- Pitts, Michael R. Poverty Row Studios, 1929–1940. McFarland & Company, 2005.
