= Pueblo Terror =

1931 film

- Directed by: Alan James
- Written by: L. V. Jefferson
- Produced by: Robert J. Horner
- Starring: Jay Wilsey; Jack Harvey; Wanda Hawley
- Cinematography: William C. Thompson
- Edited by: William Austin
- Production company: West Coast Pictures
- Distributed by: Weiss Brothers
- Release date: April 15, 1931
- Running time: 60 minutes
- Country: United States
- Language: English

Pueblo Terror is a 1931 American pre-Code Western film directed by Alan James and starring Jay Wilsey, Jack Harvey and Wanda Hawley.

== Cast ==
- Jay Wilsey as Bill Sommers
- Jack Harvey as John Weston
- Wanda Hawley as Helen Weston
- James P. Spencer as Pedro
- Aline Goodwin as Martha Morgan
- Art Mix as Buck Peters
- Yakima Canutt as Ballen, crooked Foreman
- Horace B. Carpenter as Sheriff
- Al Ferguson as Henchman Al
- Hank Bell as Henchman Hank
- Robert D. Walker as Bob Morgan

== Plot ==
A war veteran (Sommers) returns encounters a land-grab scheme when he returns home. The culprit (John Weston) denies the existence of such a plan and diverts attention when he blames Sommers for the murder of a rancher. Sommers eventually uncovers the truth and proves his innocence. The film was the second of five starring Buffalo Bill, Jr. (Wilsey), all of which were based on stories written by Canutt.

== Bibliography ==
- Michael R. Pitts. Poverty Row Studios, 1929–1940: An Illustrated History of 55 Independent Film Companies, with a Filmography for Each. McFarland & Company, 2005.
