= The Night of the Dub =

1920 film

- Directed by: Jack Harvey
- Starring: Ernest Truex
- Release date: 1920
- Running time: 20 minutes
- Country: USA
- Language: Silent

The Night of the Dub is a 1920 American short silent comedy film, directed by Jack Harvey. It stars Ernest Truex.
