= Partners (1932 film) =

1932 film

- Directed by: Fred Allen; Dave Lewis (assistant)
- Screenplay by: Donald W. Lee
- Produced by: William LeBaron
- Starring: Tom Keene
- Cinematography: Harry Jackson
- Edited by: Walter Thompson
- Music by: Arthur Lange
- Distributed by: RKO Radio Pictures
- Release date: January 8, 1932 (US)
- Running time: 58 minutes
- Country: United States
- Language: English
- Budget: $33,000
- Box office: $109,000

Partners is a 1932 American Western film directed by Fred Allen, from a screenplay by Donald W. Lee. The film stars Tom Keene, with Nancy Drexel and Bobby Nelson in supporting roles. It made a profit of $30,000.

== Plot ==
Dick Barstow owns a horse ranch. When he comes upon a traveling salesman, Carry-All Roach, and his grandson, Bud, being harassed by Chet Jarvis, he intervenes, breaking up the incident. He invites the salesman to his ranch to recover. Dick is visited by Mr. Morgan, his daughter, Jean and Jarvis. Both Dick and Jarvis are attracted to Jean. Jarvis purchases a gift for Jean and sees the large amount of cash Roach has. Roach loans Dick $1,500 after he learns Dick owes Mr. Morgan. The next day, returning to his ranch after paying off Mr. Morgan, Dick finds Roach dead by the side of the road, and Bud injured. Dick reports the murder to the local sheriff, and breaks the news of Roach's death to Bud, promising to take care of him. The sheriff suspects Dick of Roach's murder based on circumstantial proof. Dick evades arrest in order to prove his innocence. Jarvis is appointed Bud's guardian as a means to access the rest of Roach's money. Jarvis lies in wait for Dick to return to his ranch where Jean is caring for Bud. Dick convinces Jean he didn't murder Roach despite his evading arrest. Dick escapes as the sheriff and Jarvis breach his house. He returns to the site of the murder, where he finds a distinctive piece of a boot, which matches the brand worn by Jarvis. Dick breaks into Jarvis' motel room where he finds Roach's empty wallet.

Roach's estate is auctioned off at Dick's ranch with Jarvis acting as administrator. Dick rides back to his ranch, to implicate Jarvis with his proof. When confronted with the empty wallet, it is further discovered that Jarvis has a military medal of Roach's which he used to carry in his wallet. Revealed as the murderer, Jarvis attempts to flee, but is captured by Dick. Returning to his ranch, Dick cements his relationship with Jean and reaffirms his intention to rear Bud.

== Cast ==
- Tom Keene as Dick Barstow
- Nancy Drexel as Jean Morgan
- Otis Harlan as the Auctioneer
- Victor Potel as Deputy Lem
- Bobby Nelson as Bud Roach
- Lee Shumway as Chet Jarvis
- Billy Franey as Carry-All Roach
- Carlton S. King as Mr. Morgan
- Ben Corbett as Shorty
- Fred Burns as the Sheriff

(cast list as per AFI database)
