= A Newspaper Nemesis =

- Directed by: Jack Harvey
- Starring: Peggy Burke; Mrs. Samuel Sullivan; Ernest C. Warde
- Release date: 1915
- Country: USA
- Language: Silent

A Newspaper Nemesis is a 1915 American short silent drama film, directed by Jack Harvey. It stars Peggy Burke, Mrs. Samuel Sullivan, and Ernest C. Warde.

== Plot ==
Spike is a desperate fugitive hunted by the police. Early in the morning he breaks into a jewelry shop and is caught by the owner Smith. In panic, Spike kills the jeweler and escapes. The police fail to uncover any clue that might lead them to the murderer.

Molly Sayre is a reporter who feels deep sympathy for Smith’s widow and young child. Determined to see justice done, she decides to investigate the crime herself. Disguised, she spends time in the rough districts of the city where she eventually encounters Spike. From the moment she meets him, she suspects his guilt.

After gaining his trust, Molly manages to extract a confession and Spike even shows her the stolen jewels. Suddenly he grows suspicious of her intentions and attacks her. She is saved at the last moment by her lover Sergeant Jack Grant, who has been secretly watching over Molly to keep her safe.

Spike is arrested and the crime is finally solved. Molly secures an exclusive story for her newspaper while Grant is praised for the bold capture. In the end Molly and Grant are married, bringing the story to a hopeful close.

== Characters ==
Mrs. Samuel Sullivan as Mrs. Smith.

J.S. Murray as Mike/Spike's Pal.

Ernest C. Warde as Spike the Burgler.
