= The Boston Tea Party (1915 film) =

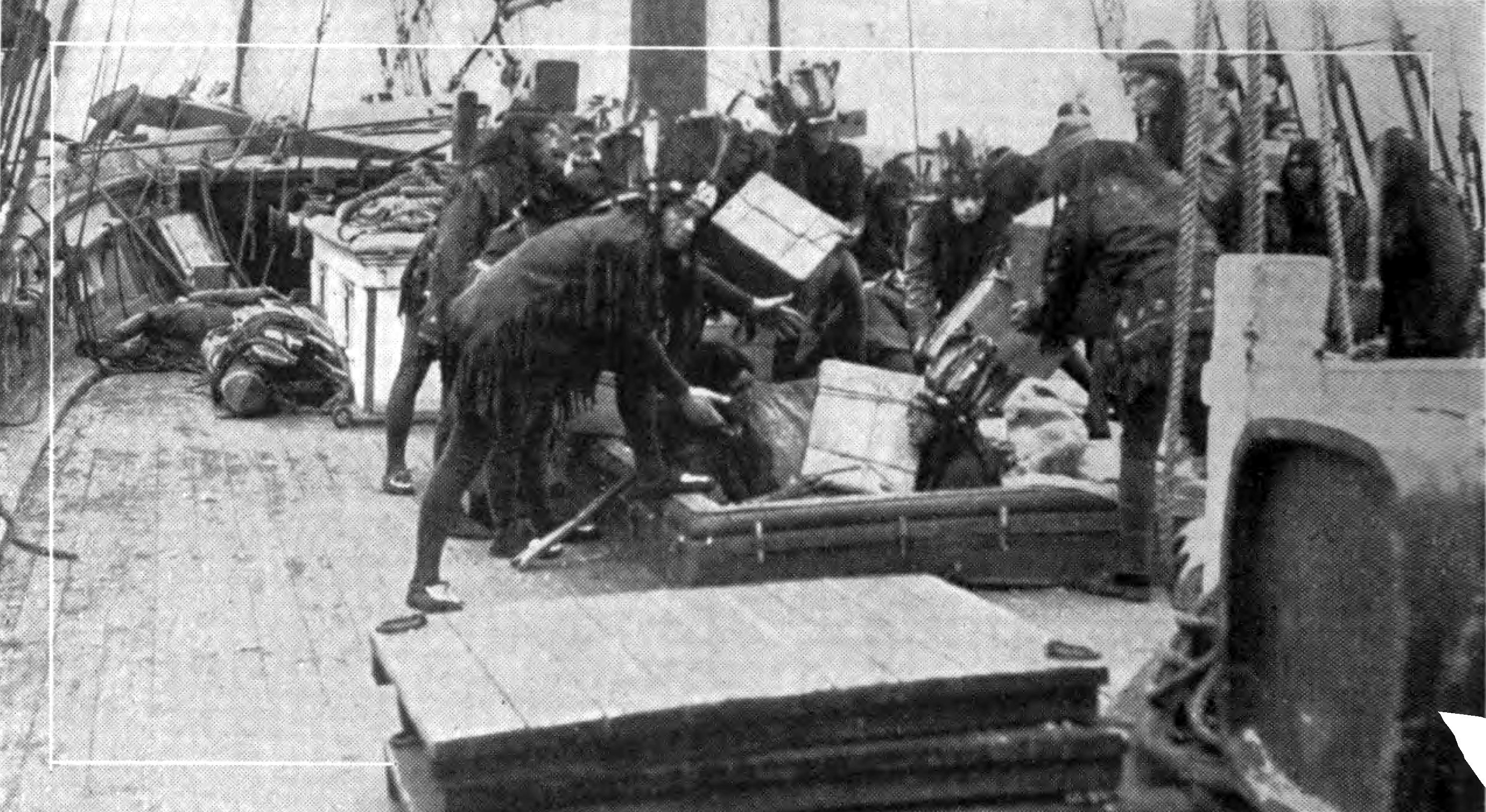
- Promotional still
- Directed by: Eugene Nowland
- Written by: Eugene Nowland
- Starring: Carlton S. King; Maxine Brown
- Production company: Edison Manufacturing Company
- Distributed by: General Film Company
- Release date: April 2, 1915
- Running time: 2000 feet
- Country: United States
- Language: Silent

The Boston Tea Party is a 1915 American silent historical film directed by Eugene Nowland. The film is an extended remake of the 1908 film of the same name, also from Edison Studios, and depicts the events of the December 16, 1773, Boston Tea Party.

== Plot ==
Described by Edison as "an adaptation of the memorable historical incident of Colonial times", the plot synopsis was:

"Ethan Ward tells Barbara, his sweetheart, that he is trying to foment a rebellion among the Colonists. At a gathering of the Colonists for the purpose of a free discussion on the subject of taxation without representation, Sam Fleet, a Tory, in league with the British soldiers, stationed in and about Boston, slips in and after he has learned the plans of the Colonists, hurries to Captain Crewe of the British and tells him young Ethan Ward is at the head of the plot. Barbara is attending the Governor's ball when Fleet enters to impart his knowledge to Captain Crewe. She does some eavesdropping and on a pretext that she is ill, leaves the Governor's mansion and hurries off to warn Ethan that Captain Crewe's men will be in search of him shortly. She stops in a wayside tavern while repairs are being made to the carriage and sees Sam Fleet, intoxicated and asleep. With assistance, she carries him to the carriage and takes him to Ethan's farm, a prisoner. She changes clothes with Ethan, and when the soldiers are nearing the house, she rides away on horseback, with the soldiers in hot pursuit. She proves herself to be an accomplished equestrienne, and the exhibition of riding is unusual. In the meantime, Ethan, attired in Barbara's raiment, leaves the farm with the colored servant in the carriage. The soldiers meet the carriage and what they see inside does not excite their suspicions. Barbara outwits them, hiding under a bridge as they go galloping by in pursuit. Ethan hurries to the place set for the meeting and soon the Colonists have arrayed themselves as Indians. In this garb, they board the “Monmouth” at dock in Boston harbor, laden with tea upon which a British tax has been laid, and dump the chests of tea into the water. The alarm is given to Captain Crewe, but when soldiers get to the ship the "Indians" have left. Ethan and Barbara then take the opportunity of discussing colonial affairs together."

== Cast ==
- Carlton S. King as Ethan Ward, a colonist
- Maxine Brown as Barbara, his sweetheart
- Helen Strickland as her mother
- Marie La Manna as Lucy, her friend
- Bert Delaney as Lieut. Crawford, Lucy's fiancé
- Ethel Lawrence as Nancy, the maid
- Pat O'Malley as Captain Crewe
- Dan Baker as Uncle Abner
- Julian Reed as Sam Fleet, a Tory
- William Bice as Governor of Massachusetts
