= Their One Love =

- Full film
- Directed by: Jack Harvey
- Written by: Gertrude Thanhouser
- Starring: Madeline Fairbanks; Marion Fairbanks; Robert Wilson
- Cinematography: Carl Louis Gregory
- Production company: Thanhouser Film Corporation
- Distributed by: Mutual Film
- Release date: May 2, 1915
- Running time: 15 minutes (1 reel)
- Country: United States
- Language: Silent (English intertitles)

Their One Love is a 1915 American silent short action drama film, directed by Jack Harvey. It stars Madeline Fairbanks, Marion Fairbanks, and Robert Wilson.

== Plot ==
Two sisters love the same man, who later dies in the American Civil War.

== Cast ==
- Madeline Fairbanks as Madeline.
- Marion Fairbanks as Marion.
- Robert Wilson as Jack, the soldier.
- Charles Emerson as Jack as a boy.

== Commentary ==
The twin sisters interact with their love interest as a whole, when Jack is addressing one sister she ensures that he next turns to interact with the other. After Jack dies, the two sisters grow old together.
