= The Small Town Girl =

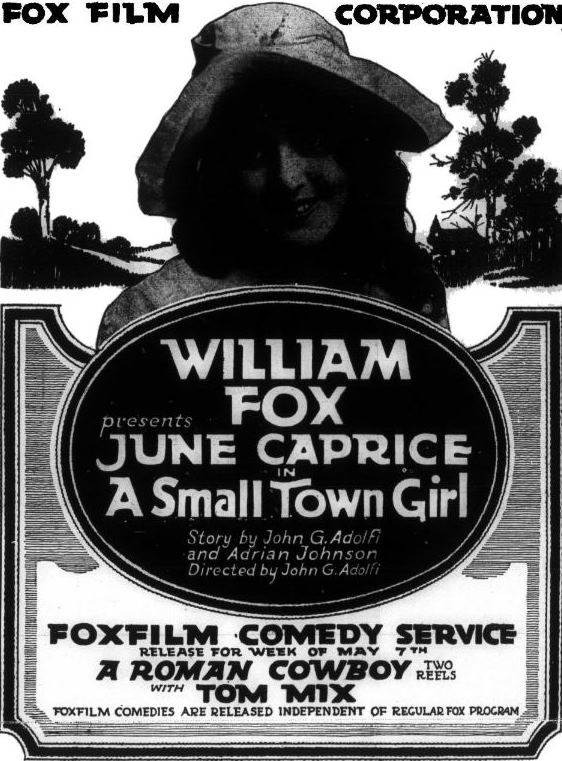
- Directed by: John G. Adolfi
- Written by: John G. Adolfi; Adrian Johnson
- Starring: June Caprice; Jane Lee; Bert Delaney
- Cinematography: Rial Schellinger
- Production company: Fox Film Corporation
- Distributed by: Fox Film Corporation
- Release date: April 30, 1917
- Running time: 50 minutes
- Country: United States
- Languages: Silent; English intertitles

The Small Town Girl is a 1917 American silent drama film directed by John G. Adolfi and starring June Caprice, Jane Lee and Bert Delaney.

== Cast ==
- June Caprice as June
- Jane Lee as Jane
- Bert Delaney as Frank
- Ethyle Cooke
- Tom Brooke as Father
- Lucia Moore as Mother
- Inez Ranous as Mame
- Harry Southard as Pete
- John Burkell

== Bibliography ==
- Solomon, Aubrey. The Fox Film Corporation, 1915-1935: A History and Filmography. McFarland, 2011.
