= Checkmate (1911 film) =

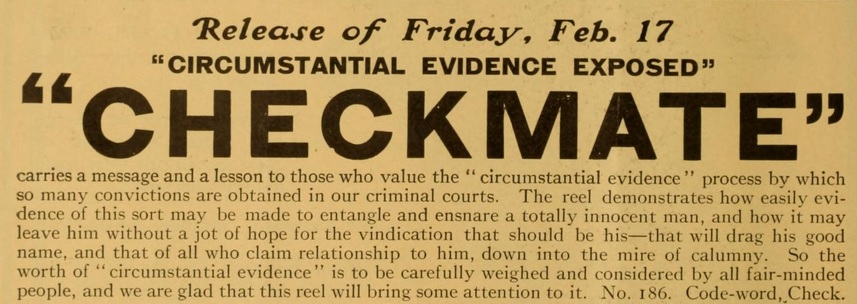
- An advertisement in The Moving Picture World
- Produced by: Thanhouser Company
- Distributed by: Motion Picture Distributors and Sales Company
- Release date: February 17, 1911
- Running time: 1 reel
- Country: United States
- Languages: Silent film English intertitles

Checkmate is a 1911 American silent short drama film produced by the Thanhouser Company. Focusing on the subject of convictions by circumstantial evidence, the plot has a French baron and an American businessman vie for the affections of an heiress. She chooses the American and the French baron conspires with the heiress's aunt to take revenge. The American falls into their trap and is accused of stabbing the baron by the conspirators. The circumstantial evidence was enough to convict him and he is sent to prison. Through the aid of a homeless doppelgänger who looks like the fiancé, he is substituted in prison and the original forces a confession from the aunt. For his plot, the baron is convicted of perjury and sent to prison. Released on February 17, 1911, the film was a critical failure for its improbable plot and its prison substitution scene. The film is presumed lost.

== Plot ==
The film focuses on a young heiress who has two suitors, one a French baron and the other an American businessman named Jack. Her aunt, who favors the French noble out her desire for status, is hurt to learn that the heiress has chosen to marry the American businessman. The baron vows revenge and schemes with the aunt to aid his plot. When the businessman comes to the house to see his fiancée, he learns that she is out of the house and sits down with the baron and aunt. Moments later, the servant rushes into the room attracted by cries to see Jack bending over the wounded baron with a knife in hand. Both the aunt and the baron accuse him of the stabbing as well as the servant and a policeman, who also saw Jack with the knife. In court, the jury finds it to be a clear case and Jack is sentenced to ten years in prison.

His fiancée is determined to prove his innocence, but knows not how to establish it. She meets a homeless man, who closely resembles Jack, who is about to commit a crime by smashing a window. The man desires to go to prison, believing it to be the only way that he will have food and shelter. The girl recognizes the opportunity and plans to pay him for taking the place of her fiancée in prison. The man consents and the heiress concocts a clever substitution that proves successful via change of clothes. Jack, now free, confronts the aunt—who believes that his reappearance is a ghostly one. The aunt confesses that the baron's wounds were self-inflicted and the circumstantial evidence that the servant and policeman had seen was an erroneous. The substitute convict is pardoned and released from prison without the swap ever being known. For his plot, the French baron is convicted for perjury and sent to the state prison.

== Production ==
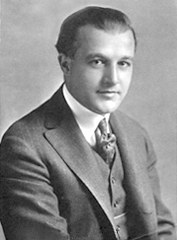
Actor William Garwood, pictured in 1915, is the only known credit for the film

The only known credit for the film is that it starred William Garwood. Film historian, Q. David Bowers notes that the plot dealing with circumstantial evidence focused on one of Lloyd Lonergan's social issues. Lonergan would produce several scenarios featuring the problems with circumstantial evidence being used to obtain convictions. Bowers notes that such convictions were a known social issue, but not a pressing one in 1911. The first such Thanhouser film to tackle the subject was Love and Law released in December 1910. Love and Law was a film which garnered some criticism for an improbable plot. Checkmate wove a more tangled web of circumstantial evidence and intrigue and the resolution comes not from an astute female detective, but by the heiress's novel substitution of a doppelgänger to the prison so that the original can get the needed confession. The serious nature of the film was highlighted with the advertising of the film by Thanhouser which states, "Checkmate carries a message and a lesson to those who value the 'circumstantial evidence' process by which so many convictions are obtained in our criminal courts. The reel demonstrates how easily evidence of this sort may be made to entangle and ensnare a totally innocent man..."

== Release and Reception ==
The single reel drama, approximately 1,000 feet long, was released on February 17, 1911. The film was met with a wide variety of reviews by critics; with the majority proving to be negative. The Morning Telegraph, like others, found the story to be foolish and completely improbable on many accounts. While the reviewer stated that no magistrate would have sent the man to jail for assault with a blunt knife, it was the jail substitution via a changing of clothes which proved to be impossible. H. Jeanval of The Moving Picture News found the baron to be boorish by shading a lady's hand with a glove on and wondered at how Thanhouser was able to film the prison scenes. Walton, also of The Moving Picture News summed up the film and stated, "Good teaching as to woman's 'class', but as to details[,] sadly lax." The New York Dramatic Mirror panned the film beginning with, "Nothing more improbable or inconsistent has been seen on the screen in some time..." The reviewer concluded the review of the improbable plot as to having been "dreamed up by a ten-year-old girl."

The film is presumed lost because the film is not known to be held in any archive or by any collector.
