= L'Article 47 =

1913 film

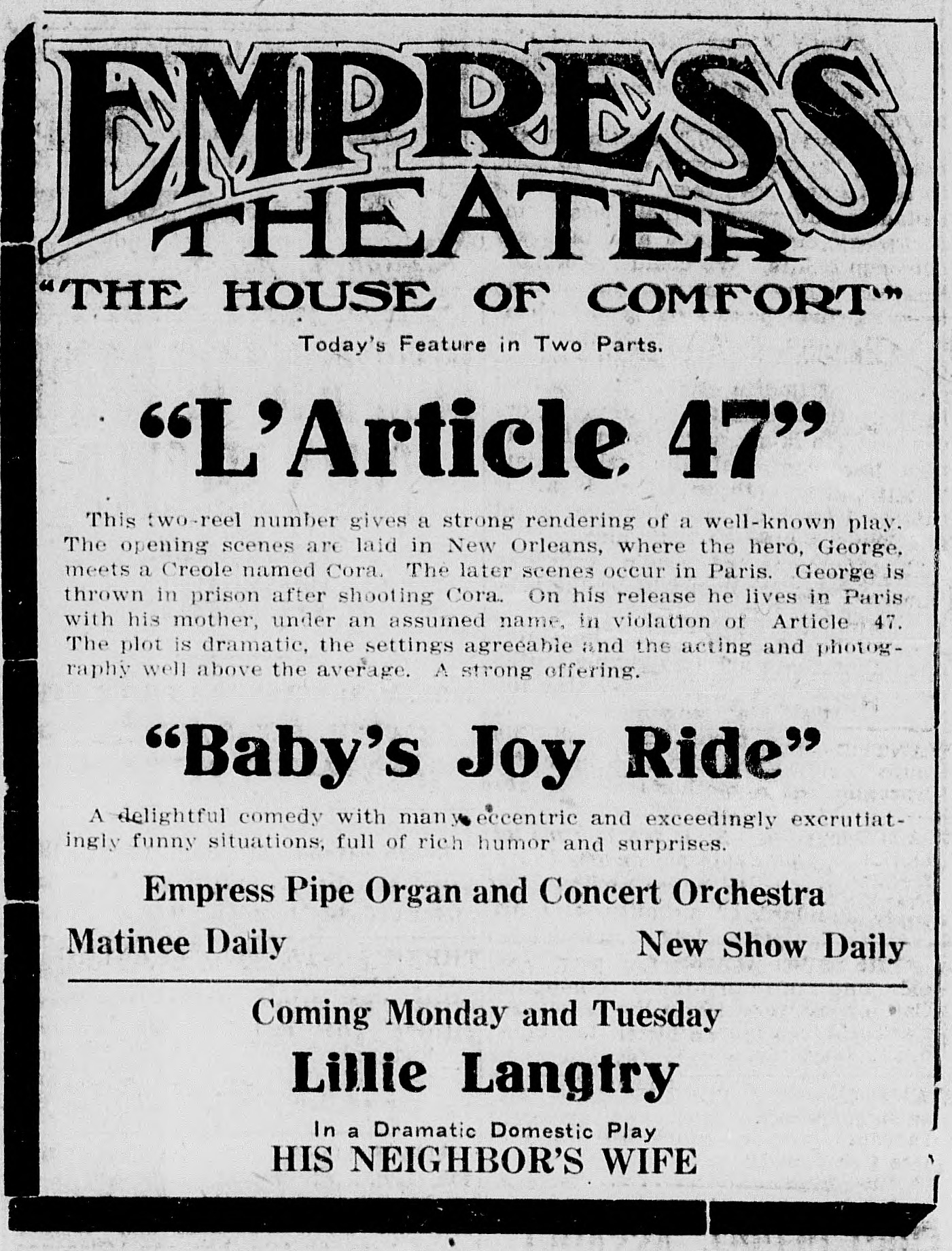
- Contemporary newspaper advertisement
- Based on: L'article 47, Or, Breaking the Ban: A Drama, in Three Acts by Adolphe Belot
- Starring: William Garwood; Victory Bateman; Howard Davies; Ethel Jewett; Ernest Joy
- Distributed by: Mutual Film
- Release date: November 18, 1913
- Running time: 2 reels
- Country: United States
- Languages: Silent; English intertitles

L'Article 47 is a 1913 American silent short drama film starring William Garwood, Victory Bateman, Howard Davies, Ethel Jewett, and Ernest Joy. The film is based on the 1872 French play of the same name by Adolphe Belot.
