= When Thieves Fall Out =

- Directed by: Jack Harvey
- Starring: Harry Benham, Sidney Bracey, and Sonia Marcelle
- Release date: 1916
- Country: USA
- Language: Silent

When Thieves Fall Out is a 1916 American short silent crime drama film, directed by Jack Harvey. It stars Harry Benham, Sidney Bracey, and Sonia Marcelle.
