= Getting His Goat =

- Directed by: Jack Harvey
- Written by: Bernard P. Arons
- Starring: William Garwood; Violet Mersereau
- Distributed by: Universal Film Manufacturing Company
- Release date: November 9, 1915
- Country: United States
- Languages: Silent film English intertitles

Getting His Goat is a 1915 American silent drama film directed by Jack Harvey and starring William Garwood and Violet Mersereau.

== Plot ==
A goat steals the hero's clothes while he is bathing.
