= Fairy Fern Seed =

1915 American film

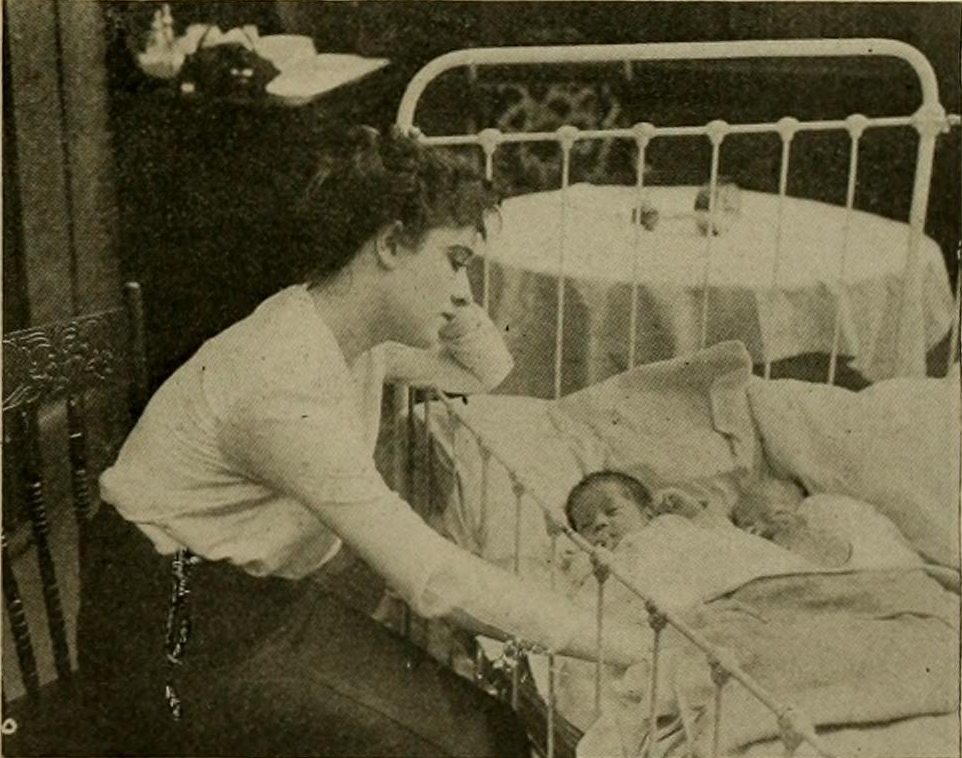
- Directed by: Jack Harvey
- Starring: Ethel Jewett
- Production company: Thanhauser
- Distributed by: Mutual Film
- Release date: May 25, 1915
- Running time: 2 reels
- Country: United States
- Language: Silent (English intertitles)

Fairy Fern Seed is a 1915 American short silent drama film directed by Jack Harvey for Thanhouser, and starring Madeline and Marion Fairbanks, Ethel Jewett, Peggy Burke, Zadee Burbank, and James Cooley.

== Plot ==
According to a film magazine, "Susanna Cross, envious of her wealthy girl chum, Rosalie Wood, whose home she shares, encourages Rosalie to elope with James Porter. Mrs. Wood, unable to forgive her daughter, now lavishes everything upon the unscrupulous Susanna. Rosalie's husband is poor, and each year life becomes a more bitter struggle. At last, Rosalie dies, leaving Porter heart-broken. When his twin daughters, Marion and Madeline, are twelve, the father also dies. They are told that they are to be sent to an institution. The two little girls have their heads full of fairy lore. Remembering the story of the princess who put fern seed in her shoes so that she could send her spirit self with a message of love to her dear prince, they decide that they will do the same, so that their spirit selves may find the grandmother whom they never have seen, and win her love and protection."

== Cast ==
- Ethel Jewett as Susanna Cross
- Peggy Burke as Rosalie Wood
- Zadee Burbank as Her Mother (as Mrs. Burbanks)
- James Cooley as James Porter, Rosalie's husband
- Madeline Fairbanks as Madeline
- Marion Fairbanks as Marion
