= Carlton S. King =

American actor (1881–1932)

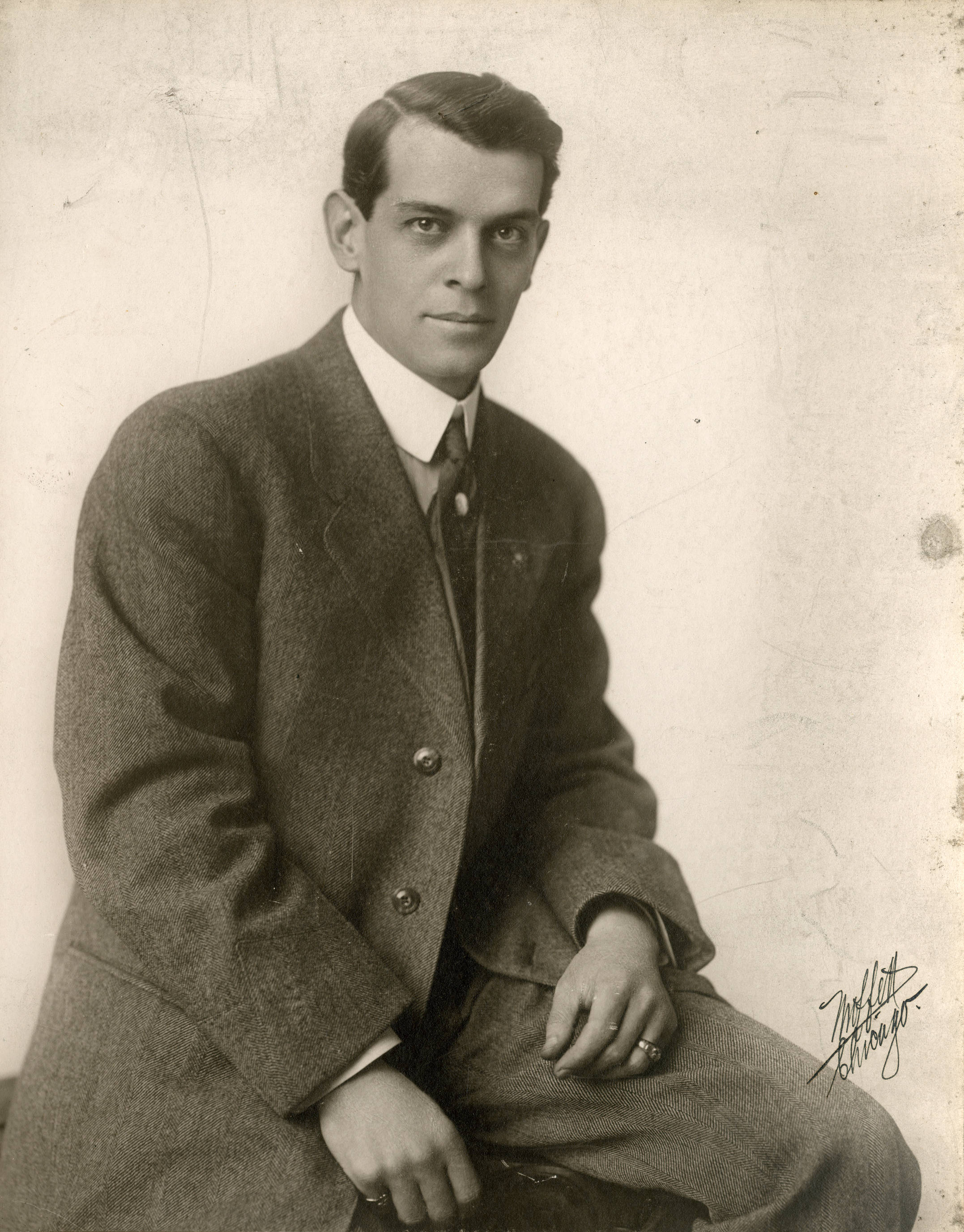
- King in 1913
- Born: December 15, 1881; St. Louis, Missouri, U.S.
- Died: July 6, 1932 (aged 50); Glendale, California, U.S.
- Occupation(s): Actor, director
- Years active: 1913–1932
- Spouse: Nettie Nash

Carlton S. King (December 15, 1881 – July 6, 1932) was an American film actor of the silent era. He also directed several films.

King also acted on stage. In 1900, he was a member of the American Opera Company.

King worked for the Edison Company for two years as a leading man and director. He also was employed by Vitagraph. He died while the film Partners (1932) was being made, and another actor dubbed his voice.

== Partial filmography ==
- The Boston Tea Party (1915)
- The Midnight Ride of Paul Revere (film) (1914), directed by Charles Brabin
- The Mystery of Room 13 (1915)
- The Girl of the Gypsy Camp (1915)
- When Love Is King (1916)
- Little Miss No-Account (1918)
- After the Show (1921)
- Luring Lips (1921)
- Kick In (1922)
- The Texas Bearcat (1925)
- South of Panama (1928)
- Midnight Life (1928)
- The House of Shame (1928)
- The Peacock Fan (1929)
- Law of the Rio Grande (1931)
- Partners (1932)

== Bibliography ==
- Langman, Larry. A Guide to Silent Westerns. Greenwood Publishing Group, 1992.
