= The Undertow (1915 film) =

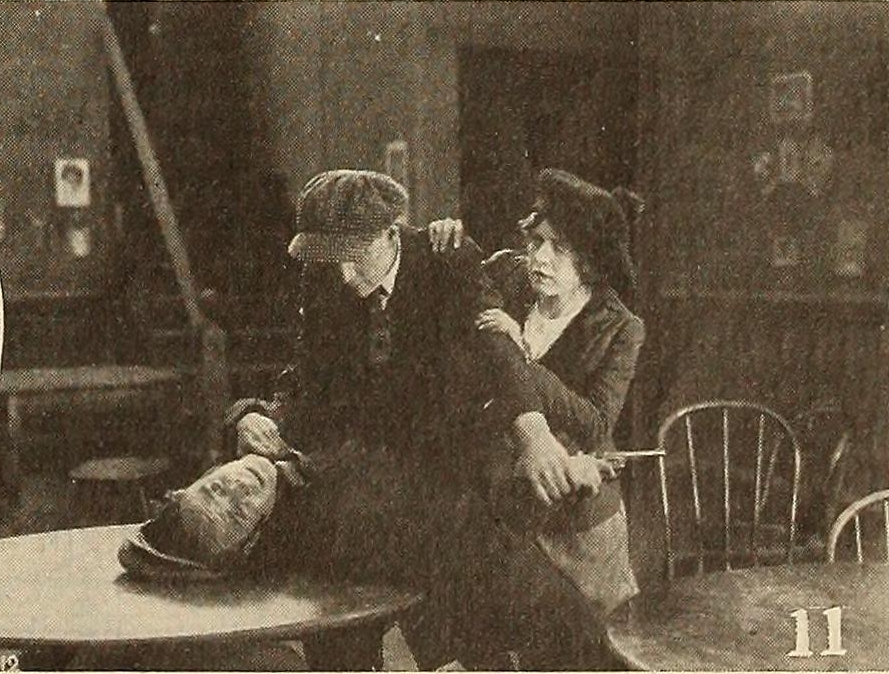
- Ernest Ward, Bert Delaney, and Ethel Jewett in a publicity still
- Directed by: Jack Harvey
- Starring: Ethel Jewett; Ernest C. Warde; Bert Delaney
- Production company: Thanhouser Company
- Distributed by: Mutual Film
- Release date: April 20, 1915
- Running time: 2 reels
- Country: United States
- Language: Silent (English intertitles)

The Undertow is a 1915 American short silent drama film, directed by Jack Harvey for the Thanhouser Company. It stars Ethel Jewett, Ernest C. Warde, and Bert Delaney.

== Plot ==
According to a film magazine, "Jack, a country boy, falls into evil hands in the city and becomes identified with a gang of thieves. In a fight with the police, the gang is chased over the roof of a house. Jack seeks refuge in one of the apartments, occupied by Detective Sergeant Grey and his sister, Florence. The girl takes pity on Jack and hides him while the search, headed by her brother, is going on. Jack promises to reform. His old associates, however, bend all their powers to drag him back. At last they manage to implicate him in a safe robbery and he is arrested. Jack, apparently escaping from prison, goes to the rendezvous of the thieves. They taunt him with his helplessness, and believing that the case against him is overwhelming, they tell him just how the evidence was planted. A detective and several officers, concealed within hearing, rush out and overcome the criminals. Jack, proven innocent, wins Florence for his wife."

== Characters ==
Richard Travers as Bull Austin

June Keith as Molly Post (Bull's Sister)

Harry Dunkinson as Old Man Austin (the Father)

John Lorenz as John Post (Molly's Husband)

William Burns as Weasel.
