= $1,000 Reward =

1915 film directed by Jack Harvey

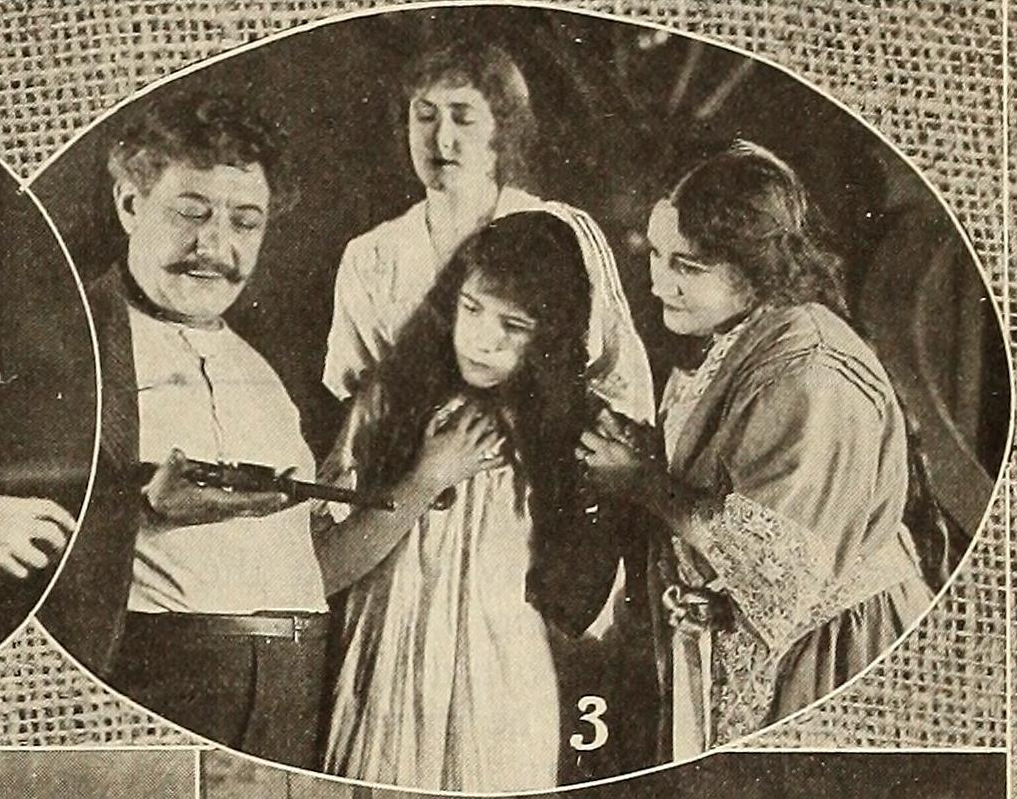
- Directed by: Jack Harvey
- Written by: John Kellette
- Starring: Madeline Fairbanks; Marion Fairbanks; Jane Fairbanks
- Production company: Thanhouser Company
- Distributed by: Mutual Film
- Release date: February 26, 1915
- Running time: 1 reel
- Country: United States
- Language: Silent

$1,000 Reward is a 1915 American short silent drama film, directed by Jack Harvey for the Thanhouser Company. It stars Madeline Fairbanks, Marion Fairbanks, Jane Fairbanks.

== Plot ==
The widowed Mrs. Goddard is mother to two twin daughters, Madeline, and Marion, who is disabled. To make ends meet, Mrs. Goddard takes in sewing and Madeline sells papers, and while distributing papers, she gains the attention of a wealthy girl. She convinces her father, Mr. Gordon, to pay for Marion's surgery and have her stay at their house.

Soon after, the notorious burglar, Red Hogan, breaks into the Gordon home. Marion prevents his escape and causes him to be arrested, and is offered the $1,000 reward for his capture by Mr. Gordon. She refuses, but the Gordon family could not bear to part with her, and makes the Goddard family members of his household.

== Cast ==
- Madeline Fairbanks as Madeline
- Marion Fairbanks as Marion
- Jane Fairbanks as Mrs. Goddard (as Mrs. Farrington)
- Henry Leone as Mr. Gordon
- Fanny Hoyt as Mrs. Gordon (as Mrs. Edward Hoyt)
- Minnie Berlin as May Gordon
- Ernest C. Warde as Red Hogan
- J.S. Murray as Whitey
