= The Texas Bearcat =

1925 film

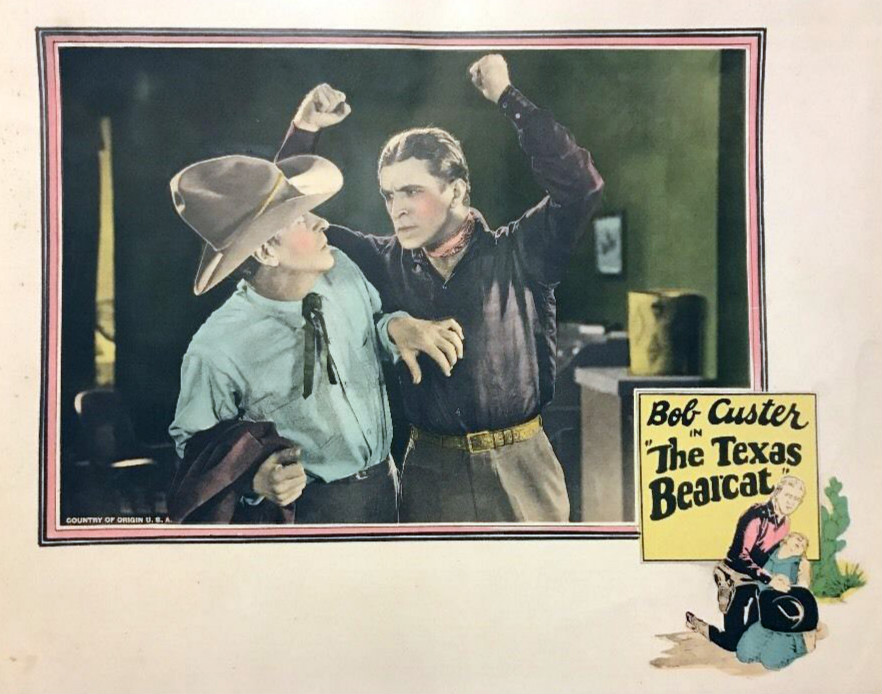
- Lobby card
- Directed by: B. Reeves Eason
- Written by: George H. Plympton
- Story by: F. J. Rhetore
- Produced by: Jesse J. Goldburg
- Starring: Bob Custer; Sally Rand
- Cinematography: Jack Draper (billed as Lauren A. Draper)
- Production company: Robertson-Cole Pictures Corporation
- Distributed by: Film Booking Offices of America (FBO)
- Release date: May 31, 1925
- Running time: 5 reels
- Country: United States
- Languages: Silent; English intertitles

The Texas Bearcat is a 1925 American silent Western film directed by B. Reeves Eason and starring Bob Custer. It was distributed by Film Booking Offices of America.

== Plot ==
Raised to believe he is the son of a half breed Dave aids Sethman in the struggle against Crawford interests which try to get control of surrounding ranches. After coming West with her father, Crawford, Jean is saved from a runaway by Dave. Later she is saved by Dave when the unprincipled Murdock, Crawford’s agent, attempts to attack her. Sethman, to get even with Crawford, plans to rustle the cattle. In the fight Crawford wounds Sethman, but Dave shoots Crawford in the hand. Sethman, dying, tells that Dave was stolen from Crawford when a child. Then Dave is unhappy as ever until he finds that Jean is not his sister, being an adopted daughter of Crawford. With this knowledge he becomes her fiance.

== Cast ==
- Bob Custer as Dave Sethman
- Sally Rand as Jean Crawford
- Harry von Meter as John Crawford
- Jack Richardson as Watson
- Carlton S. King as Sethman
- Lee Shumway as Murdock

== Preservation ==
With no copies of The Texas Bearcat located in any film archives, it is a lost film.
