= The Norwood Necklace =

1911 film

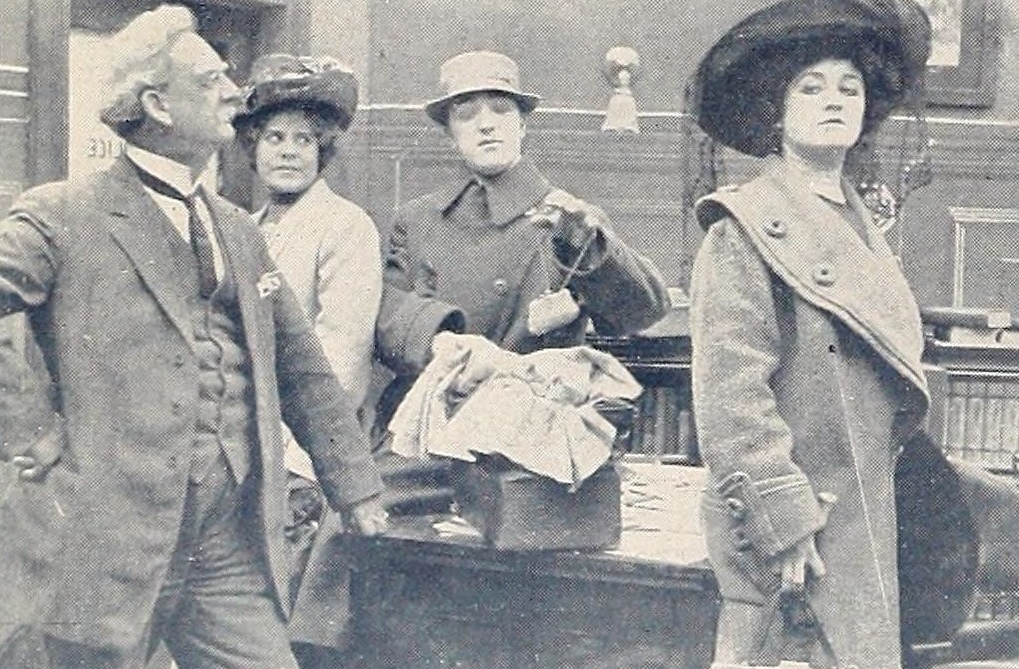
- A surviving film still
- Produced by: Thanhouser Company
- Distributed by: Motion Picture Distributing and Sales Company
- Release date: February 10, 1911
- Running time: 1 reel
- Country: United States
- Languages: Silent film English intertitles

The Norwood Necklace is a 1911 American silent short drama film produced by the Thanhouser Company. It is the third of the four "Violet Grey, Detective" series of films produced by Thanhouser and starring Julia M. Taylor. The film begins with the police being alerted to a female suspect who is believed to have the famous Norwood necklace. The police arrest and search the suspect, but find nothing and release her. Violet Grey has suspicions that the suspect has the necklace and tracks her to a hotel, whereby she disguised herself as a maid. Grey finds the necklace and the suspect is arrested. The film was released on February 10, 1911 and was met with positive reviews. The film is presumed lost.

== Plot and production ==
The famous Norwood necklace has been stolen and the female detective, Violet Grey, is wired the details of the case after officers in another city failed to make an arrest in the case. As the authorities are en route to apprehend the well-dressed woman suspect, the suspect receives a warning by telegraph allowing her to conceal the necklace. When the police apprehend the suspect, nothing is found and the captain has to apologize profusely for the error. Only Violet Grey did not believe an error had been made. She makes a bet to her superior office that her suspicions were right. With the clues of the little girl and her doll she tracks the suspect to a hotel, and disguised as a maid finds the necklace. The woman is arrested and Grey uses the money from her winnings to buy a ring - a constant reminder she wears to remind her superior officer of his error in judgement.

This film was the third release in the "Violet Grey, Detective" series from Thanhouser. Both Love and Law and The Vote That Counted were popular precursors and The Norwood Necklace was no different. The director of this film is unknown as well as most of the cast, save for Julia M. Taylor in the role of Violet Grey. The film is presumed lost because the film is not known to be held in any archive or by any collector. Possible identification of other cast members may be possible due to a surviving film still which shows the woman suspect, the superior officer and Julia M. Taylor as Violet Grey. The final film The Court's Decree would be released on July 11, 1911.

== Release and reception ==
The single reel drama film, approximately 1,000 feet long, was released on February 10, 1911. The Moving Picture World gave a positive review of the film's photography, good acting and had no complaints about the clarity of the story. The New York Dramatic Mirror praised the film, but did note a few loose ends in the plot. After the announcement the necklace had been stolen, a man gives it to the woman and evades suspicion by the police. It is not established how the detectives learn the woman has it or why they are unaware of the original thief. The male suspect is so free of suspicion that he overhears the detectives and telegraphs his accomplice in time for her to hide it inside the doll.
