= Ethel Jewett =

American actress

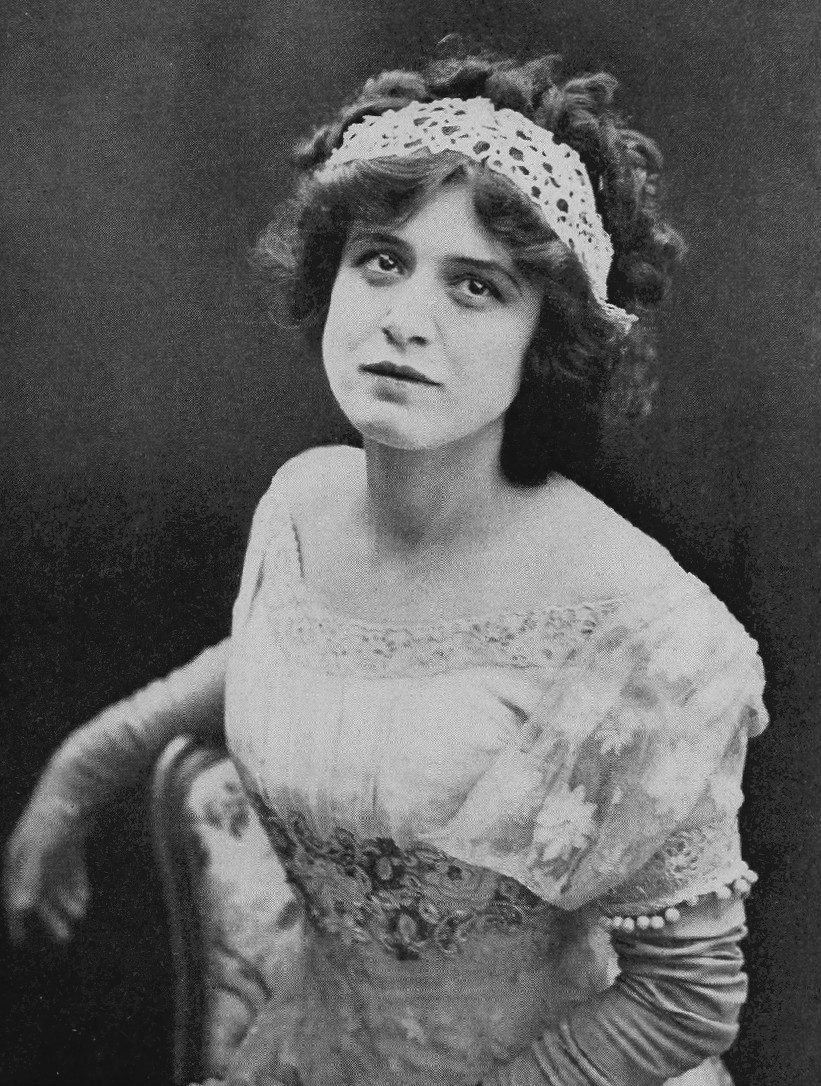
- Born: September 8, 1877; Portland, Oregon, U.S.
- Died: December 8, 1944 (aged 67); Los Angeles, California, U.S.
- Occupation: Actress
- Years active: 1901–1915

Ethel Jewett (September 8, 1877 – December 8, 1944) was an American silent film actress.

== Biography ==
Jewett was born in Portland, Oregon in 1877. She was educated in Portland and San Francisco, California. In late 1901, she joined a stage company headed by Don Daly, and appeared in Philadelphia at the Garrick Theatre with Daly's troupe in a stage production of The New Yorkers in December that year. She also worked as a model, and later appeared in productions in New York City at the Weber Music Hall in 1906.

She would go on to appear in multiple silent films beginning in 1910, working for American Biograph, Gaumont, Famous Players, and Thanhouser. Her career in film earned her notable popularity, as she was the runner up to Clara Kimball Young in a December 1915 popularity contest sponsored by the New York Sunday Telegraph. She was awarded an Overland automobile in the contest. Jewett relocated to New York City in 1916, living on 207th street in the Bronx for several years.

She appeared in films such as The Land Beyond the Sunset (1912), L'article 47 (1913), The Undertow (1915) and Fairy Fern Seed (1915). She worked for a period with the Edison Stock Company.

Jewett died in Los Angeles, California in 1944.

== Filmography ==
Year	Title	Role	Notes
1910	The Stenographer's Friend; Or, What Was Accomplished by an Edison Business Phonograph	Stenographer	Short film
1910	A Family of Vegetarians	The Bride	Short
1910	Bob and Rowdy	Bob's Sister	Short
1911	The Sign of the Three Labels	The Maid	Short
1911	How Sir Andrew Lost His Vote	Amateur Actress	Short
1912	The Spanish Cavalier	Fortune Teller	Short
1912	The Necklace of Crushed Rose Leaves	Girl	Short
1912	How Bobby Joined the Circus	Snake Charmer	Short
1912	The Land Beyond the Sunset	Committee Woman	Short
1913	Red and Pete, Partners	The Wife	Short
1913	L'article 47	Cora	Short
1913	Eighty Million Women Want - ?	Mabel, Robert's Fiancé	Short
1914	Remorse	May Ransom	Short
1914	For Her Child	Aline Harper	Short
1914	Mother's Choice	Tenement Sick Woman	Short
1914	Pawns of Fate	Nurse	Short
1914	A Messenger of Gladness	Mrs. Graham	Short
1914	The Creator of 'Hunger'	Ethel Stewart	Short
1915	The Shoplifter	Meta	Short
1915	Who Got Stung?	Bess Bray	Short
1915	Fairy Fern Seed	Susanna Cross	Short
1915	It's an Ill Wind	Servant	Short
1915	The Undertow		Short
1915	The Girl of the Sea	Martha Starr	Short
1915	Innocence at Monte Carlo	Eulalie Pedue	Short
1915	The Flying Twins	Lucia Marshall	
1915	His Two Patients	Wealthy Patient's Maid	Short
1915	Outcasts of Society	Marianna, the Lady	Short
1915	The Miracle	Mother	Short
1915	The Little Captain of the Scouts	Big Sister's Friend	Short
1915	The Valkyrie	Mountain Girl	Short
1915	The House Party at Carson Manor	Blondine Elliott	Short
1915	The Necklace of Pearls	Crook	Short
1916	Bubbles in the Glass	Vineyard Worker	Short
1916	Pete's Persian Princess	Siminia, the Persian Princess	Short
1916	Silas Marner	Nancy	Short
1916	The Reunion	Relée	Short
1916	The Net	Mysterious Girl	Feature
