= The Flying Twins =

- Directed by: Jack Harvey
- Starring: Marion Fairbanks, Madeline Fairbanks, Lorraine Huling, and Boyd Marshall
- Release date: 1915
- Country: USA
- Language: Silent

The Flying Twins is a 1915 American short silent drama film, directed by Jack Harvey. It stars Marion Fairbanks, Madeline Fairbanks, Lorraine Huling, and Boyd Marshall.

== Plot ==
The plot follows a wealthy manufacturer who has two twin daughters. As a friend the daughters have their cousin, a country girl (portrayed by Lorraine Huling), who makes the acquaintance of a vaudeville acrobat.

This relationship is discovered by the manufacturer and - extremely displeased - has it broken. As a result the country girl meets and marries a young clerk, and the twins are sent to their Aunt Sally in the country while their father and mother are away on a trip.

When a circus comes to the little town, they are much attracted by its tinsel display. The acrobat the girls met with their country cousin is now with the circus. He and his wife discover the girls and persuade them to join the circus. They become clever performers, and the acrobat rejoices in the distress their disappearance has occasioned their father, who turns out to be the manufacturer - the very one who broke up the friendship with the little country girl.

His hatred leads the acrobat into mailing a taunting, anonymous letter to the manufacturer. A clever detective traces the communication and the little girls are restored to their home and distracted parents.

== Characters ==
Boyd Marshall as Vinald Marshall, the twins' father.

Marion Fairbanks as Flying Twin 1.

Madeline Fairbanks as Flying Twin 2.

Lorraine Huling as Cousin Carolyn.

Ethel Jewett as Lucia Marshall, the twins' mother.

Nellie Parker Spaulding as Aunt Sally.

Harry LaPearl as Fred Morris.

Bertha Leon as Stella, Fred's wife.

W. Ray Johnston as The Ringmaster.

J. Morris Foster, as Peter Goddard.
