= The Beauty Shop (film) =

1922 film by Edward Dillon

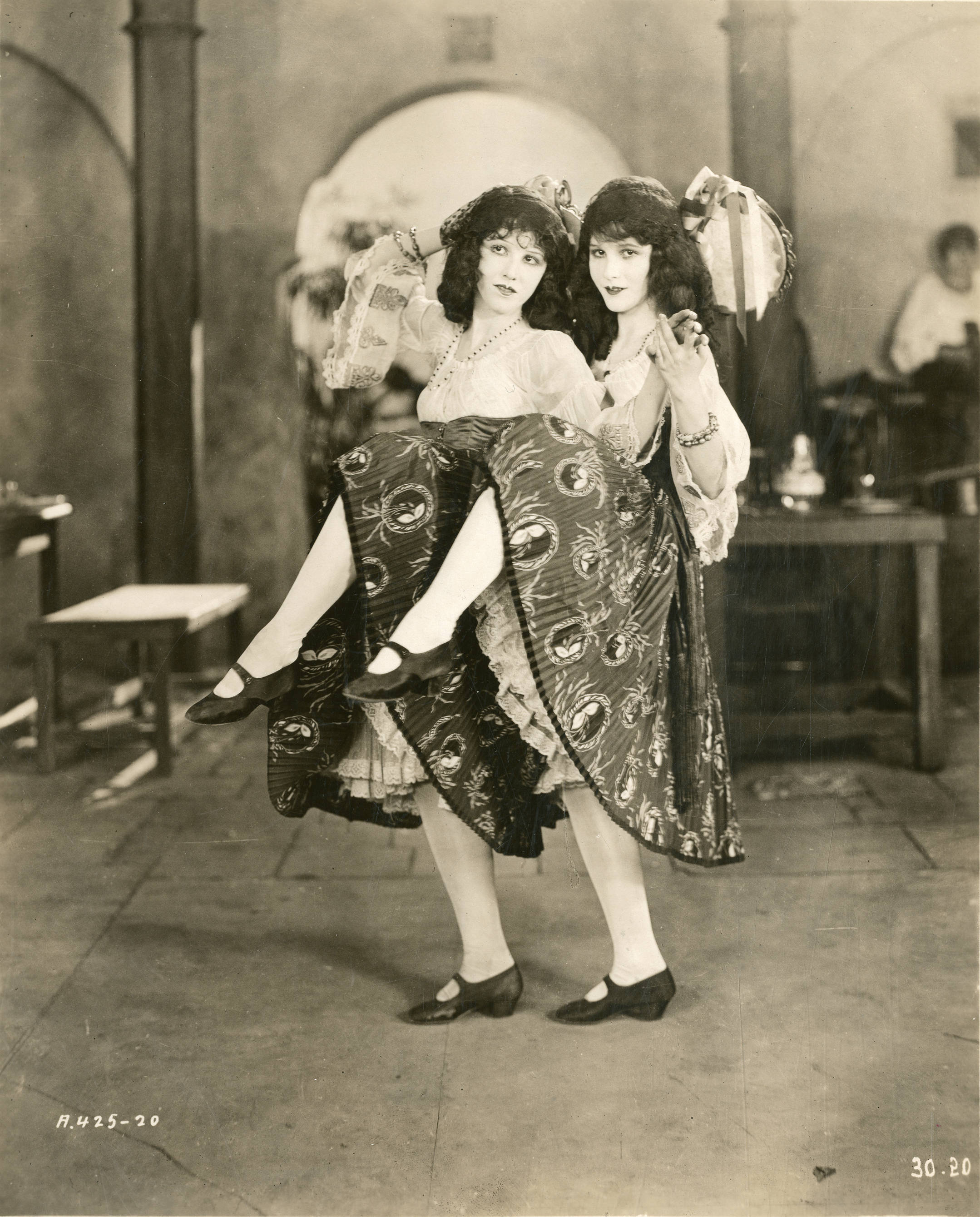
- Film still with the twins
- Directed by: Edward Dillon
- Screenplay by: Doty Hobart
- Based on: The Beauty Shop by Channing Pollock and Rennold Wolf
- Starring: Raymond Hitchcock; Billy B. Van; James J. Corbett; Louise Fazenda; Madeline Fairbanks; Marion Fairbanks
- Cinematography: Harold Wenstrom
- Production company: Cosmopolitan Productions
- Distributed by: Paramount Pictures
- Release date: May 14, 1922
- Running time: 70 minutes
- Country: United States
- Language: Silent (English intertitles)

The Beauty Shop is a lost 1922 American silent comedy film directed by Edward Dillon and written by Doty Hobart based upon the play of the same name by Channing Pollock and Rennold Wolf. The film stars Raymond Hitchcock, Billy B. Van, James J. Corbett, Louise Fazenda, Madeline Fairbanks, and Marion Fairbanks. The film was released on May 14, 1922, by Paramount Pictures.

== Plot ==
As described in a film magazine, Dr. Arbutus Budd is besieged by creditors who insist on being repaid, telling one holding a bill while he held a saxophone that "I can't pay it but I can play it." Dr. Budd has purchased the right to the crest of an impoverished nobleman and is using it on the bottles of lotions that he sells. This nobleman, the last of the Sizerella, fled to escape the undertaker as it is the time-honored custom in their native town of Bologna for a Sizerella to be shot by a Maldonado. Sobini has come to the United States to bring back a Sizerella to be shot by a Maldonado. He finds Dr. Budd and decides to bring him back as "all Sizerellas look alike to him." Dr. Budd, eager to escape his creditors, willing goes with him, bringing his ward and attorney. In Bologna the innkeepers daughter falls for Dr. Budd, but he has his eye on Cola, while her twin sister Coca loves the scion of the rival house of Madonado. Dr. Budd spends the rest of the film turning back a clock to escape the hour set for the duel, mixing up the twins, and avoiding marriage to the innkeepers daughter, who in the end uses the doctor's "Cremo" beauty lotion to become a desirable maiden, with even her hair becoming curled by the treatment.

== Cast ==
- Raymond Hitchcock as Dr. Arbutus Budd.
- Billy B. Van as Sobini.
- James J. Corbett as Panatella.
- Louise Fazenda as Cremo Panatella.
- Madeline Fairbanks as Coca.
- Marion Fairbanks as Cola.
- Diana Allen as Ann Budd.
- Montagu Love as Maldonado.
- Larry Wheat as Phil Briggs.
