= Harold Wenstrom =

American cinematographer

- Born: Harald Oscar Ludwig Wenstrom; January 4, 1893; Brooklyn, New York, US
- Died: April 26, 1944 (aged 51); Washington, D.C., US
- Occupation: Cinematographer
- Spouse: Ella Williams

Harald Oscar Ludwig "Wennie" Wenstrom (January 4, 1893 – April 26, 1944) was an American cinematographer.

== Biography ==
Harold was born in Brooklyn to Ludwig Wenstrom and Ida Petersen. His parents were Swedish immigrants. He began working as a cameraman for Sidney Drew at Metro in New York City around 1914.

During World War I, after first serving as a seaman, he was moved to the navy's photographic division and assigned to accompany President Woodrow Wilson's first trip to Europe.

After the war, he arrived in Hollywood to work for Maxwell Karger. 1919 saw Wenstrom gaining a reputation for his collaborations with actress Alla Nazimova and his ability to get difficult shots: On one occasion, he got footage while strapped to a plane's fuselage.

During World War II, he joined the Navy (after serving for many years in the reserves), earning the rank of lieutenant commander. He died in his room at the Ambassador Hotel in Washington, D.C., in 1944; the cause of death was noted as a heart attack suffered after a bout of pneumonia.

He was married to Ella "Bill" Williams, a studio manager at Cosmopolitan Pictures and former secretary of actress Marion Davies, for many years.

== Selected filmography ==
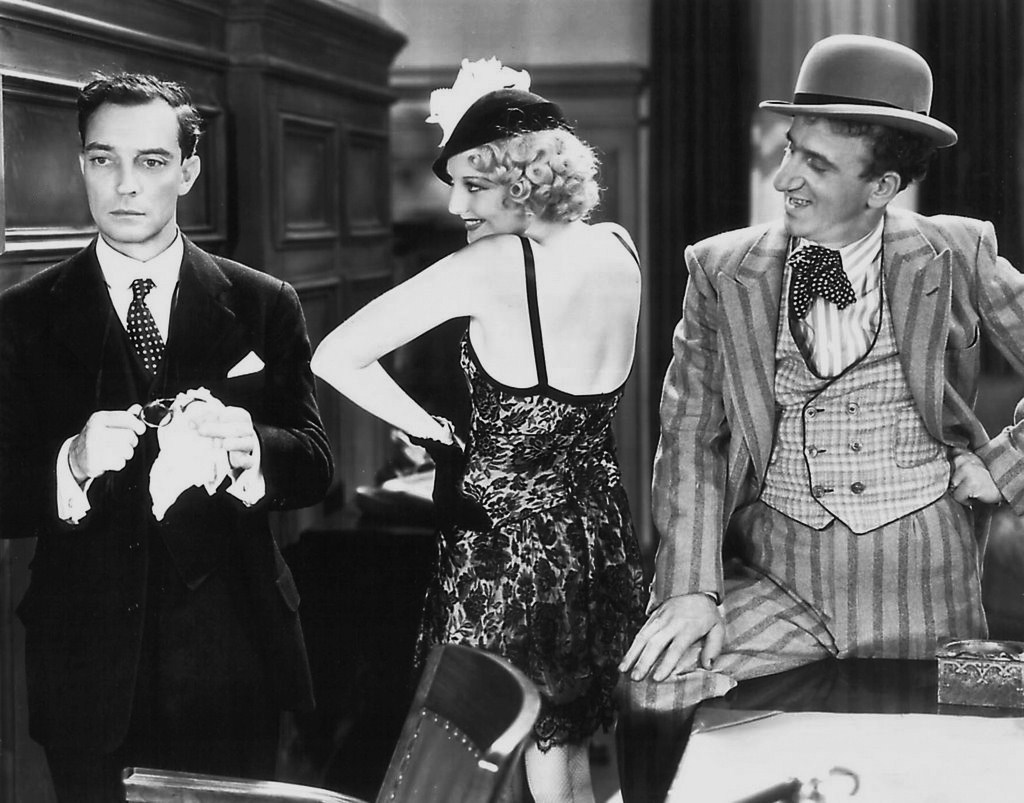
L. to R.: Buster Keaton, Thelma Todd & Jimmy Durante in Speak Easily.

- Annie Oakley (1935)
- Powdersmoke Range (1935)
- The Arizonian (1935)
- Laddie (1935)
- Red Morning (1934)
- Wednesday's Child (1934)
- Gift of Gab (1934)
- Their Big Moment (1934)
- Keep 'Em Rolling (1934)
- The Lost Patrol (1934)
- What-No Beer? (1933)
- Fast Life (1932)
- Speak Easily (1932)
- Huddle (1932)
- Hell Divers (1931)
- Menschen hinter Gittern (1931)
- Min and Bill (1930)
- The Big House (1930)
- Born to Battle (1927)
- The Midnight Watch (1927)
- The Lady in Ermine (1927)
- Hazardous Valley (1927)
- Syncopating Sue (1926)
- Into Her Kingdom (1926)
- Born to Battle (1926)
- Zander the Great (1925)
- The Great White Way (1924)
- Under the Red Robe (1923)
- The Go-Getter (1923)
- Adam and Eva (1923)
- The Face in the Fog (1922)
- When Knighthood Was in Flower (1922)
- The Young Diana (1922)
- The Beauty Shop (1922)
- Proxies (1921)
- The Saphead (1920)
- The Best of Luck (1920)
