= Bert Delaney =

Bert Delaney (born January 16, 1891) was an American actor who appeared in American silent films and in theater. Born in Minneapolis, Minnesota, he appeared in over 20 silent films between 1915 and 1918. He was named "among the players of drama" along with actors Boyd Marshall and Thomas A. Curran.

== Filmography ==
- The Boston Tea Party as Lt. Crawford
- The Undertow (1915)
- A Message Through Flames (1915)
- Getting the Gardener's Goat (1915)
- A Message Through Flames (1915)
- The Dead Man's Keys (1915)
- The Road to Fame (1915)
- The Scoop at Bellville (1915)
- "Clarissa's" Charming Calf (1915)
- Mr. Meeson's Will (1915)
- Inspiration as The Artist's Friend
- His Vocation (1915)
- His Majesty, The King (1915)
- Belinda's Bridal Breakfast (1916)
- Grace's Gorgeous Gowns (1916)
- Lucky Larry's Lady Love (1916)
- The Knotted Cord (1916)
- What Doris Did (1916)
- The Net (1916)
- The Carriage of Death (1916)
- Peterson's Pitiful Plight (1916)
- The Window of Dreams (1916)
- The Small Town Girl (1917) as Frank
- The Perfect Model (1918), an Arrow Film Corporation reissue of the November 18, 1915 Thanhouser film Inspiration

== See also ==
- List of Thanhouser Company films
