= The Center of the Web =

- Directed by: Jack Harvey
- Starring: Claire Kroell, Frank Wood, and Samuel N. Niblack
- Production company: Thanhouser Company
- Release date: December 1, 1914
- Running time: 26 minutes, 38 seconds
- Country: USA
- Language: Silent

The Center of the Web is a 1914 American short silent crime drama film, directed by Jack Harvey for the Thanhouser Company. It stars Claire Kroell, Frank Wood, and Samuel N. Niblack.

== Plot ==
Ida Dean is criminal working with the counterfeiter George Moley. However, she meets and falls in love with John Linton, a man working for the secret service. Moley berates and threatens her, but she continues having trysts with Linton.

== Characters ==
- Claire Kroell as Ida Dean.
- Frank Wood as John Linton.
- Samuel N. Niblack as George Morley - the Counterfeiter.
- Marguerite Marsh as The Old Clerk's Daughter.
