= When Fate Rebelled =

- Directed by: Jack Harvey
- Starring: Boyd Marshall, Muriel Ostriche, and Frank Wood
- Release date: 1915
- Country: USA
- Language: Silent

When Fate Rebelled is a 1915 American short silent drama film, directed by Jack Harvey. It stars Boyd Marshall, Muriel Ostriche, and Frank Wood.

== Plot ==
Alice Roland is devoted to John Reynolds, a trusted cashier employed by a large company. She joins him on a trip into the countryside where he is scheduled to distribute wages to workers. During the outing, the bag containing the payroll mysteriously disappears from their car. In the shock that follows, Reynolds wrongly believes Alice may be responsible for the loss. When the theft is reported, he is promptly dismissed from his position.

Though she is hurt by the accusation, Alice is determined to clear Reynolds’s name and prove that he has misjudged her. Her suspicions turn to George Rawlings a rival for her affection who clearly bears ill will toward Reynolds. Alice soon discovers that Rawlings leads a gang of criminals. She follows him to their hideout where she finds and recovers the stolen money.

While escaping in a taxicab Alice is pursued by the gang and nearly caught. She is saved only by the timely arrival of Reynolds and the police. Rawlings and his accomplices are arrested the money is returned to the firm and Alice’s courage is rewarded when her repentant lover renews his devotion to her.

== Characters ==
Boyd Marshall as John Reynolds.

Muriel Ostriche as Alice Roland.

Frank Wood as George Rawlings.
