= The House of Shame =

1928 film by Burton L. King

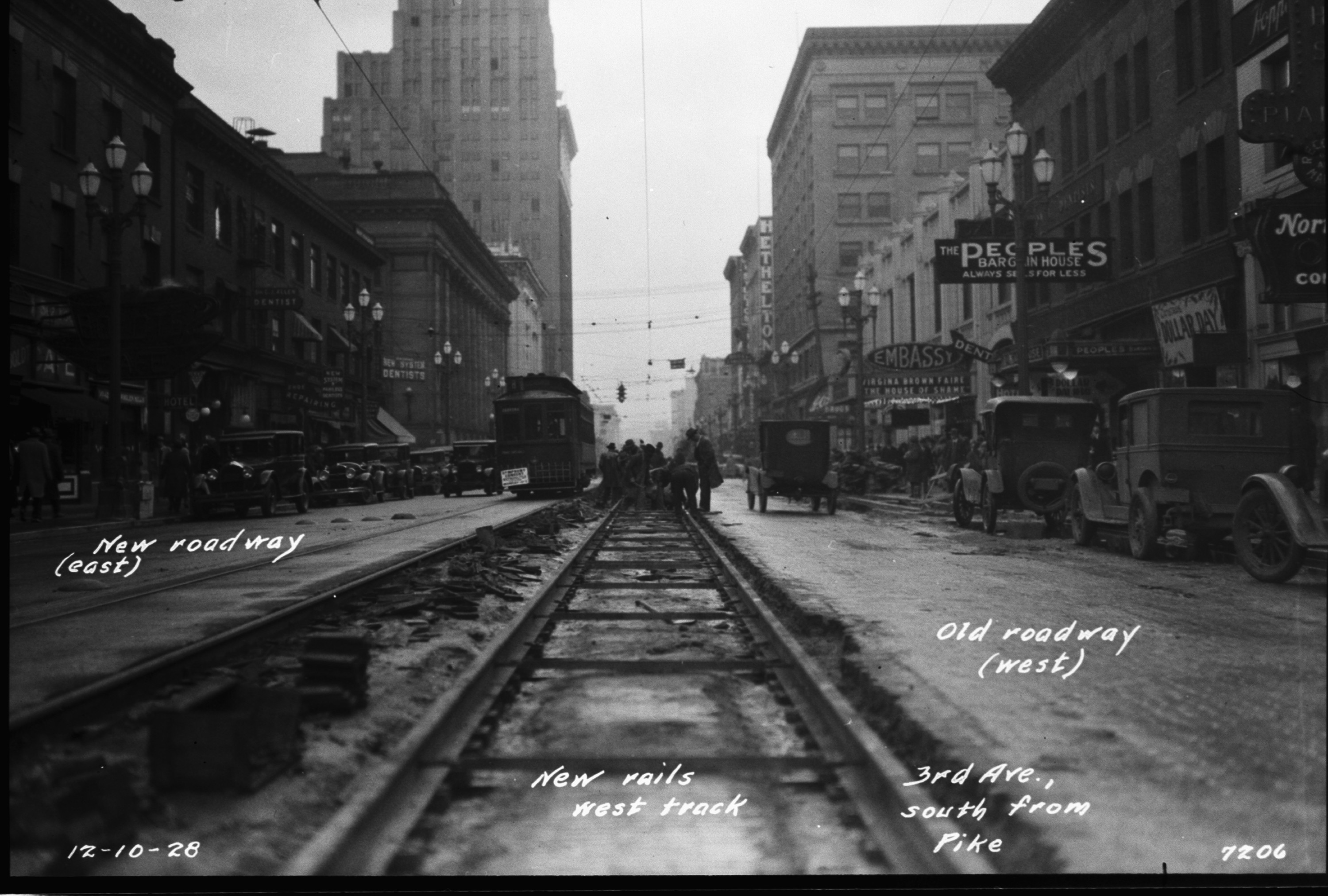
- Seattle theater showing the film in 1928
- Directed by: Burton L. King
- Written by: LeeDe Leon Anthony; Lee Authmar; Arthur Hoerl; Lon Young
- Starring: Creighton Hale; Virginia Brown Faire; Lloyd Whitlock
- Cinematography: M.A. Anderson
- Edited by: De Leon Anthony
- Production company: Chesterfield Pictures
- Distributed by: Chesterfield Pictures
- Release date: October 1, 1928
- Running time: 60 minutes
- Country: United States
- Languages: Silent; English intertitles

The House of Shame is a 1928 American silent drama film directed by Burton L. King and starring Creighton Hale, Virginia Brown Faire, and Lloyd Whitlock.

== Plot ==
After stealing from his job, husband asks wife to "convince" his boss not to press charges.

== Cast ==
- Creighton Hale as Harvey Baremore
- Virginia Brown Faire as Druid Baremore
- Lloyd Whitlock as John Kimball
- Florence Dudley as Doris
- Fred Walton as M. Fanchon
- Carlton S. King as The Irate Husband
- Julia Griffith as Country Club Gossip
- George Kuwa as Kuwa, Kimball's Valet

== Censorship ==
Like many American films of the time, The House of Shame was subject to cuts by city and state film censorship boards. In Kansas the film, with a plot condoning a romantic relationship between a wife and her husband's employer, was banned by the Board of Review.

== Bibliography ==
- Michael R. Pitts. Poverty Row Studios, 1929-1940: An Illustrated History of 55 Independent Film Companies, with a Filmography for Each. McFarland & Company, 2005.
