= Galloping Thunder (1927 film) =

1927 film

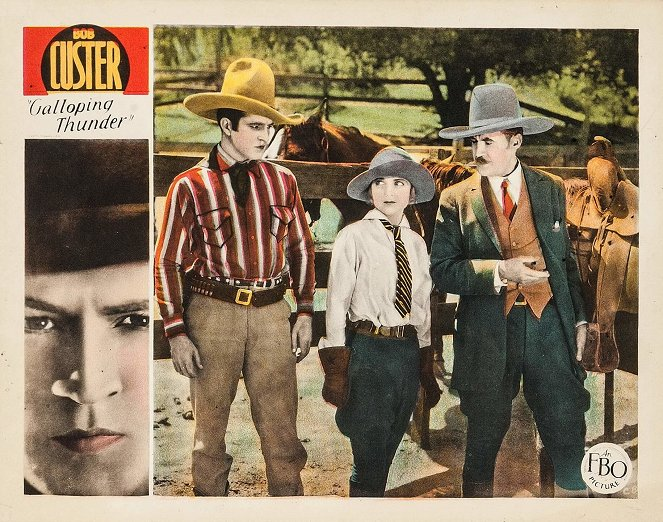
- Directed by: Scott Pembroke
- Written by: W. Bert Foster; George Morgan
- Produced by: Joseph P. Kennedy
- Starring: Bob Custer; Anne Sheridan; J.P. Lockney
- Cinematography: Ernest Miller
- Production company: Bob Custer Productions
- Distributed by: Film Booking Offices of America
- Release date: July 24, 1927
- Running time: 50 minutes
- Country: United States
- Languages: Silent; English intertitles

Galloping Thunder is a lost 1927 American silent Western film directed by Scott Pembroke and starring Bob Custer, Anne Sheridan and J.P. Lockney.

== Cast ==
- Bob Custer as Kincaid Currier
- Anne Sheridan as Judith Lamb
- J.P. Lockney as Oliver Lamb
- Richard Neill as Dallas
- Fernando Gálvez as Lash M'Graw

== Preservation ==
With no holdings located in archives, Galloping Thunder is considered a lost film.
