= Lucius J. Henderson =

American film director and actor (1861–1947)

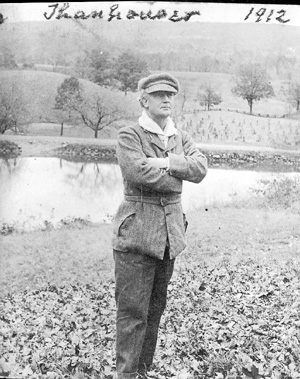
- Henderson during production of The Forest Rose, October 1912
- Born: Lucius Junius Henderson; June 8, 1861; Aledo, Illinois
- Died: February 18, 1947 (aged 85); Manhattan, New York
- Education: Harvard College (1883)
- Occupation: Film director
- Spouse: Gretchen Lyons (m. 1896)

Lucius Junius Henderson (June 8, 1861 – February 18, 1947) was an American silent film director and actor of the early silent period involved in more than 70 film productions.

== Biography ==
Born in Aledo, Illinois, Henderson was a classically trained musician who later attended Harvard College. He began stage-acting in the early-1880s and later supported both Mesdames Modjeska and Janauschek in repertory.

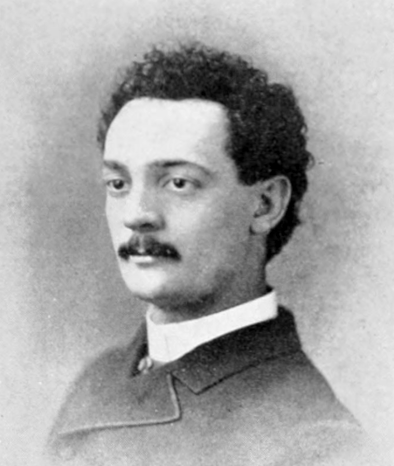
At Harvard, c. 1885

He entered film with the Thanhouser Company in late 1910, functioning as chiefly a director. In the autumn of 1913, Henderson led the Thanhouser company of players to Los Angeles. But while the unit quickly returned to New Rochelle, New York, Henderson remained behind to direct for Majestic Film Company and the Long Beach-located California Motion Picture Company. He was working for Universal Studios by 1915 and later claimed to have been the first to recognize the potential of Rudolph Valentino. Henderson directed 73 films before his retirement from directing at the end of 1917.

However, in 1923 he resurrected his interest in movies and rekindled his abilities as an actor, starring in a number of films in the mid-1920s.

The veteran actor/director turned to radio work after the changeover to sound. The oldest living member of the Lamb's Club, Henderson was honored with a testimonial dinner in 1942.

He died at his home on 335 West 43rd Street in New York City in 1947.

== Filmography ==
=== Director ===
- To the Highest Bidder (1917)
- The Untamed (1917)
- The Beautiful Impostor (1917)
- Stolen Honors (1916)
- Cheaters (1916)
- Love's Masquerade (1916)
- The Trail of Chance (1916)
- A Splash of Local Color (1916)
- The Garden of Shadows (1916)
- Behind the Veil (1916)
- The Scarlet Mark (1916)
- The Limousine Mystery (1916)
- The Three Wishes (1916)
- A Huntress of Men (1916)
- The Girl Who Feared Daylight (1916)
- Thrown to the Lions (1916)
- The Little Fraud (1916)
- The Strength of the Weak (1916)
- Madame Cubist (1916)
- Artistic Interference (1916)
- A Sea Mystery (1916)
- The Heart of a Mermaid (1916)
- The Tale of the 'C' (1915)
- Li'l Nor'wester (1915)
- The Woman Who Lied (1915)
- Under Southern Skies (1915)
- The Taming of Mary (1915)
- Jeanne of the Woods (1915)
- The Little White Violet (1915)
- Circus Mary (1915) (as Lucius C. Henderson)
- A Daughter of the Nile (1915)
- The Judgement of Men (1915)
- A Witch of Salem Town (1915)
- The Girl Who Had a Soul (1915)
- The Blank Page (1915)
- The Honor of the Ormsbys (1915)
- The Broken Toy (1915)
- The Rustle of a Skirt (1915)
- The Supreme Impulse (1915)
- Mary's Duke (1915)
- The Golden Spider (1915)
- The Bribe (1915)
- On Dangerous Ground (1915)
- Salomy Jane (1914)
- The Tomboy's Race (1913)
- Sapho (1913)
- The Little Girl Next Door (1912/I)
- Undine (1912)
- Lucile (1912) ... aka Lucille
- As Others See Us (1912)
- Cousins (1912)
- The Merchant of Venice (1912)
- Under Two Flags (1912)
- Doggie's Debut (1912)
- The Professor's Son (1912)
- Farm and Flat (1912)
- The Twins (1912)
- The Night Clerk's Nightmare (1912)
- Why Tom Signed the Pledge (1912)
- On the Stroke of Five (1912)
- Her Secret (1912)
- Dottie's New Doll (1912)
- The Little Shut-In (1912)
- When Mandy Came to Town (1912)
- The Baby Bride (1912)
- An Easy Mark (1912)
- The Star of the Side Show (1912)
- My Baby's Voice (1912)
- The Poacher (1912) ... aka The Poachers (USA)
- Dr. Jekyll and Mr. Hyde (1912)
- The Lady from the Sea (1911) (as Lucius J. Henderson)
- The Imposter (1911) (as Lucius J. Henderson)
- Adrift (1911) (as Lucius J. Henderson)
- When Love Was Blind (1911) (as Lucius J. Henderson)

=== Actor ===
- Toilers of the Sea (1923)
- A Man Must Live (1925)
- White Mice (1925)
- The New Commandment (1925)
- The Great Deception (1926)
- Once in a Blue Moon (1935)
