= When Love Was Blind (1911 film) =

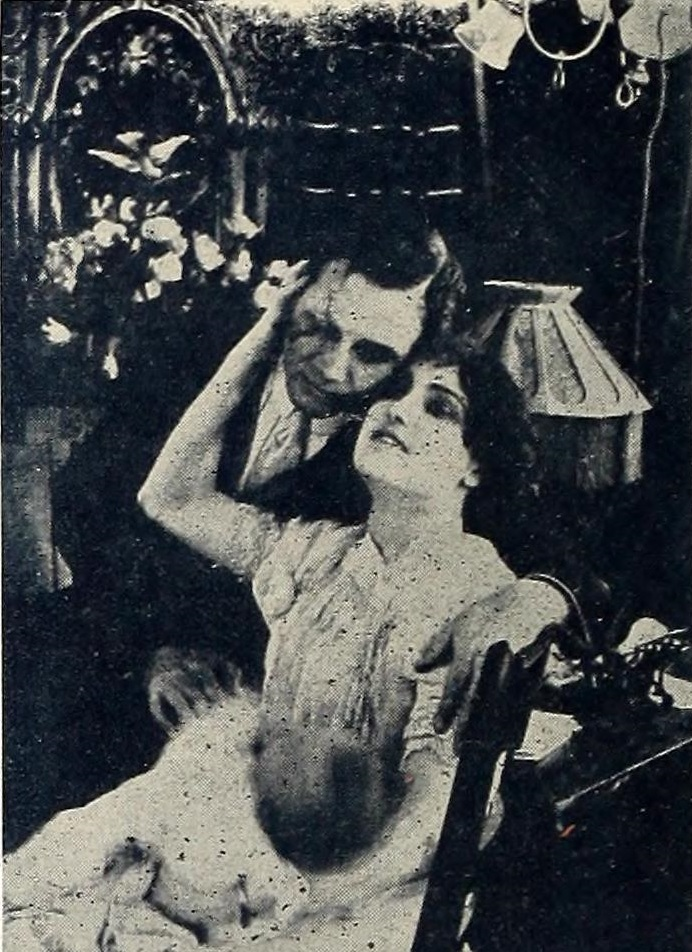
- A surviving film still
- Directed by: Lucius J. Henderson
- Produced by: Thanhouser Company
- Starring: Lucille Younge
- Distributed by: Motion Picture Distributing and Sales Company
- Release date: January 24, 1911
- Running time: 1 reel
- Country: United States
- Languages: Silent film English intertitles

When Love Was Blind is a 1911 American silent short drama film produced by the Thanhouser Company. The film focuses on young blind woman, May Read, who is saved from her burning home by Frank Larson. In the act of saving her, Frank is disfigured, but the two fall and love, marry and have a child. Two years later, the family physician offers to restore May's sight through a surgery. Frank consents despite his fears that May will not love him if she gazes upon his disfigured face. The surgery is a success and the doctor tells May not to remove the bandages. May ignores this warning and is permanently blinded after attempting to gaze at her husband, but she is content knowing her baby is beautiful. Directed by Lucius J. Henderson and starred Lucille Younge, the film was a critical success. The film is presumed lost.

== Plot ==
The film focuses on May Read, the daughter of a wealthy widow, who was blinded by an unknown affliction when she was a child. While her mother is away, a fire starts in the house and May is left in the blaze while the servants flee. Frank Larson makes his way into the burning house and brings May out to the safety of the street, but doing so has disfigured him for life. May and Frank fall in love and the couple are married with the blessing of May's mother.

Two years pass and couple have their first child. Their family physician offers to perform an operation to restore May's sight. Despite Frank's worries that his wife will not love him if she should see his scarred face, Frank consents to the operation. The operation is a success and the doctor warns May not to remove the bandages as she will lose her sight again. May's desire to see her child is so strong that she removes the bandages and gazes upon her child. Upon trying to gaze upon her husband, who is standing in strong light, May is permanently blinded. The film concludes with May being content with her blindness and knowing that her baby is as beautiful.

== Production ==
Little is known about the production of the work. The film was shot at the Thanhouser Studio in New Rochelle, New York under the direction of Lucius J. Henderson and starred Lucille Younge as May Read. A surviving film still shows the "disfigured husband", giving the possibility of identifying the actor who played Frank Larson. The film is presumed lost because it is not known to be held in any archive or by any collector.

== Release and reception ==
The single reel film, approximately 960 feet long, was released on January 24, 1911. Reviews for the film from critics and industry publications were positive. The Billboard gave the film a positive review for its moving story of true love shown by the actors playing the blind wife and facially disfigured husband. The reviewer also noted that the photography was up to the usual high standard of Thanhouser releases. The Moving Picture World opened with the declaration that, "When this picture is past, the wonder will linger long in the memory whether the wife would have loved her husband just the same if she had seen him in the short time when her affliction was alleviated. And it must be admitted that the producers have added materially to the dramatic interest of the film by leaving that question unanswered." The New York Dramatic Mirror review praised the film for its photography, setting and acting, but highlighted technical inconsistencies in the progression of the fire and the overly drawn out struggle of the father in the smoke. Walton of The Moving Picture News also praised the film, stating that "The situations are well handled; the acting of the principals shows the true grip of the characters. The work of this firm of late has been not only artistic but throbbing with that clean, human life which is winning high praise." In local papers, the film was reviewed positively by theater advertisements, owing to the sentimental nature of the film and the technical execution of the fire scene.
