= The Scrapper (1922 film) =

1922 American silent film by Hobart Henley

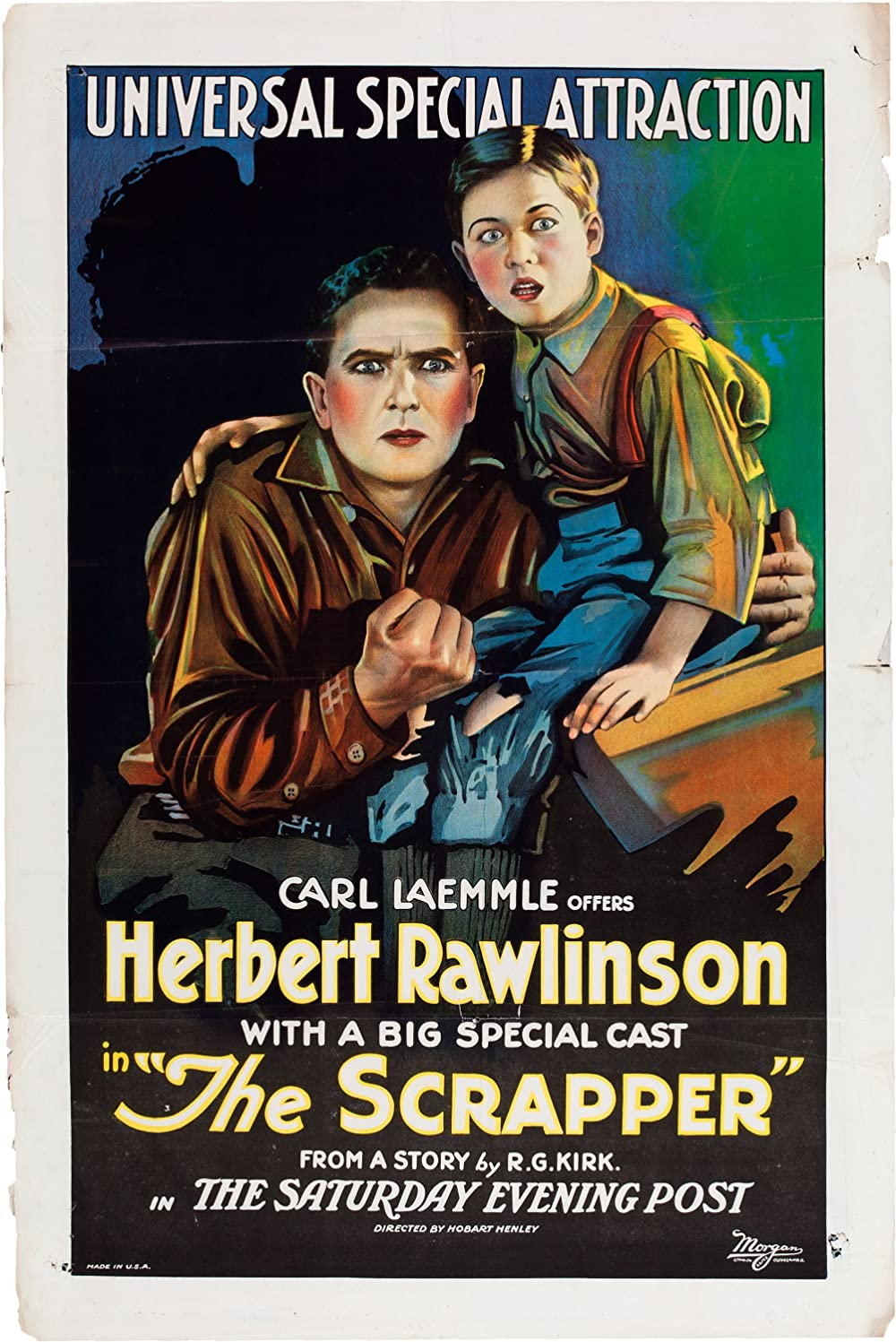
- Directed by: Hobart Henley
- Written by: Edward T. Lowe Jr.
- Based on: Malloy Campeador by Ralph G. Kirk
- Produced by: Carl Laemmle
- Starring: Herbert Rawlinson; Gertrude Olmstead; William Welsh
- Cinematography: Virgil Miller
- Production company: Universal Pictures
- Distributed by: Universal Pictures
- Release date: February 6, 1922
- Running time: 50 minutes
- Country: United States
- Languages: Silent; English intertitles

The Scrapper is a 1922 American silent drama film directed by Hobart Henley and starring Herbert Rawlinson, Gertrude Olmstead and William Welsh.

== Cast ==
- Herbert Rawlinson as Malloy
- Gertrude Olmstead as Eileen McCarthy
- William Welsh as Dan McCarthy
- Frankie Lee as The Kid
- Hal Craig as Speed Cop
- George A. McDaniel as McGuirk
- Fred Kohler as Oleson
- Edward Jobson as Riley
- Albert MacQuarrie as Simms
- Walter Perry as Rapport

== Bibliography ==
- Connelly, Robert B. The Silents: Silent Feature Films, 1910-36, Volume 40, Issue 2. December Press, 1998.
- Munden, Kenneth White. The American Film Institute Catalog of Motion Pictures Produced in the United States, Part 1. University of California Press, 1997.
