= Cosmo Kyrle Bellew =

American actor

Cosmo Kyrle Bellew (November 23, 1883–January 25, 1948) was a British/American vaudeville and film actor.

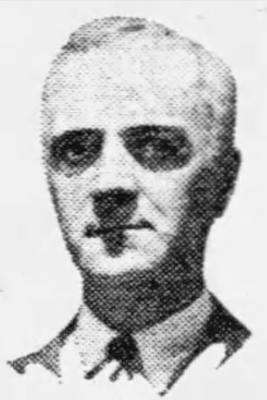
Cosmo Bellew in 1925

== Biography ==
Bellew claimed to have been born in London, England, and claimed to be the son of noted stage actor Kyrle Bellew (Kyrle Bellew, at his death, was reported to be "unmarried"- long divorced after a brief marriage- and "survived by a sister", with no mention of a son or any other children). Cosmo Bellew's actual birth date is unclear- no birth record being apparent- with various subsequent official documents giving dates between 1874 and 1883. He immigrated to the United States in 1914, and began his career as a vaudeville actor, appearing in The Devil's Mate in 1915.

In 1917 he enlisted in the British Army in World War I.

Following the war he continued his career in theater, appearing in the musical vaudeville skit Somewhere in France in 1918, when he was stranded in Omaha, Nebraska by the Spanish flu, and was reduced to working in a meat-packing plant and subsisting on free meals. He appeared in the musicals Dearie and The Canary in 1920, and The Boy and Good Morning Judge in 1921,

In 1926 he appeared on stage in the Ziegfeld musical Louie the Fourteenth, and the Fox Film Summer Bachelors (as Bachelor No. 3).

In 1927 he moved to Los Angeles and signed with Sam Goldwyn. Following this, he appeared in a number of films, although never in a starring role. In 1928 he appeared in Hit of the Show, starring Joe E. Brown, The Bellamy Trial, The Magic Flame starring Ronald Colman and Vilma Banky, and Man, Woman and Sin, which starred John Gilbert.

== Filmography ==
Year	Title	Role
1926	Summer Bachelors	Bachelor No. 3
1927	The Magic Flame	The husband
1927	French Dressing	
1927	Man, Woman and Sin	(uncredited)
1928	The Hit of the Show	Henry Carson
1928	Black Butterflies	Judge Davis
1928	Midnight Life	Harlan Phillips
1929	Disraeli	Mr. Terle (uncredited)
1929	The Bellamy Trial	Farwell
1929	Strange Cargo	Sir Richard Barclay
1929	The Devil's Apple Tree	the roué
1930	Lummox	John Bixby
1930	The Second Floor Mystery	
1931	The Lady Who Dared	Seton Boone-Fleming
1931	The Love Contract	Sir George
1933	Design for Living	Basington's voice
1934	The Merry Widow	escort
1934	Beloved	doctor
1934	Behold my Wife!	Mr. Lawson
1934	Now I'll Tell	Oakley Evans
1934	Riptide	
1935	The Perfect Gentleman	English fop
1935	Splendor	guest at dinner
1935	Here Comes Cookie	dignified man
1936	Collegiate	
1938	Vogues of 1938	man in tuxedo (uncredited)

== Personal ==
Bellew was notable for his "young face" that was "emphasized by his snow-white hair, it having turned grey at the age of 18." It was also reported that, as a singer, he had an "excellent voice."

In 1925 he married Anita Blun in Greenwich, Connecticut. She later appeared with him in Lummox. The couple had no children. In his later years Bellew suffered from a heart condition, and died at home in Beverly Hills on January 25, 1948. Anita died on May 15, 1960. The couple are buried in Forest Lawn Memorial Park in Glendale, California.
