= Gertrude Olmstead =

American actress (1897–1975)

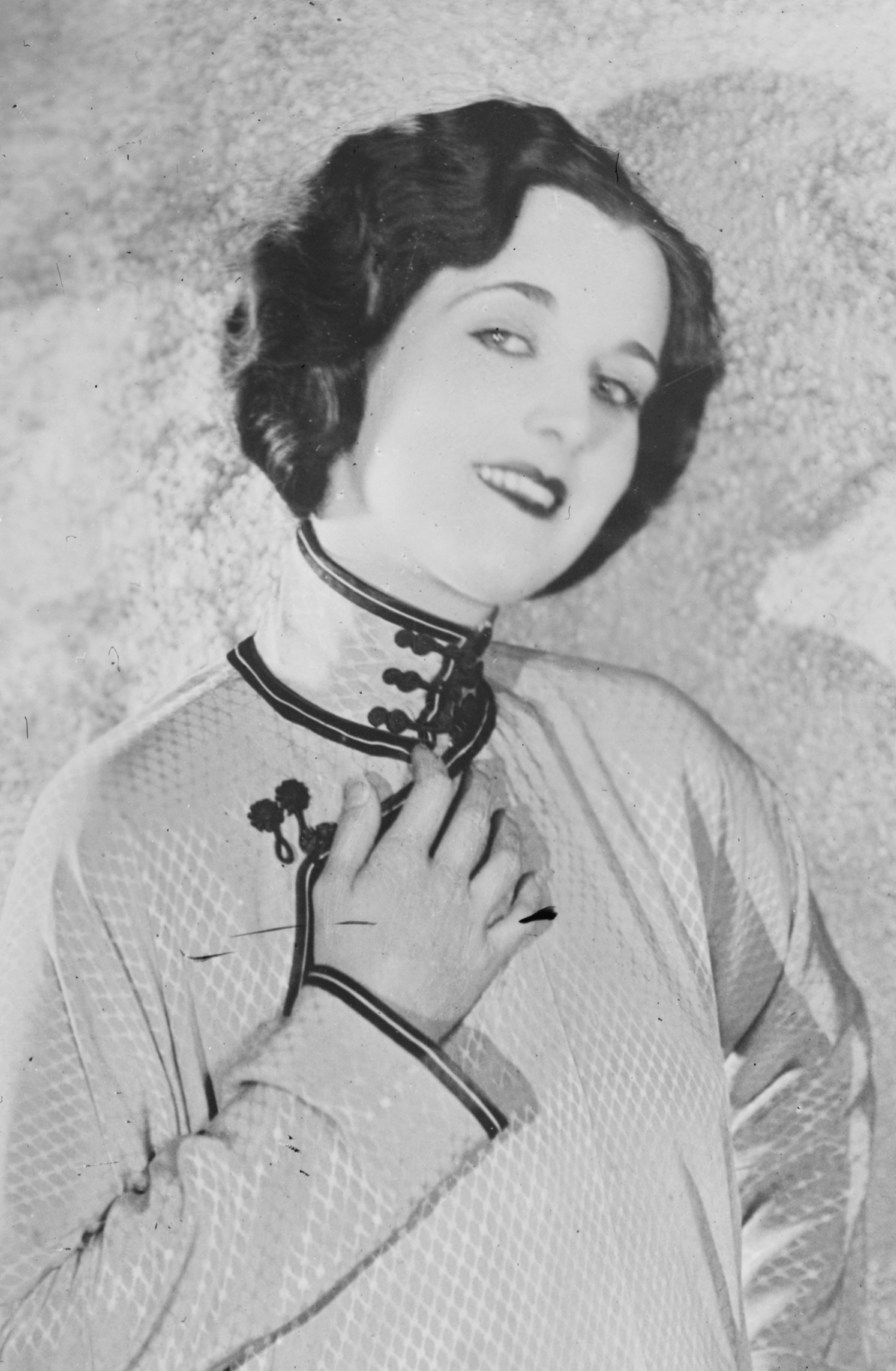
- Olmstead in 1927
- Born: November 13, 1897; Chicago, Illinois, U.S.
- Died: January 18, 1975 (aged 77); Beverly Hills, California, U.S.
- Occupation: Actress
- Years active: 1920–1929
- Spouse: Robert Z. Leonard (m. 1926; died 1968)

Gertrude Olmstead (November 13, 1897 – January 18, 1975) was an American actress of the silent era. She appeared in 56 films between 1920 and 1929. Her last name was sometimes seen as Olmsted.

== Career ==
Olmstead was born in Chicago, Illinois, and was noticed after winning a 5,900-entrant contest to represent "The Spirit of America" at the 1920 Elks Club national convention. The victory included an opportunity to receive a $10,000 one-year contract to appear in films.

Olmstead initially was signed by Universal Motion Picture company. Her first film was Tipped Off (1920), following which she became the leading lady in western films that starred Hoot Gibson. She appeared in her first credited film role in the 1921 film The Fox. She obtained several more roles that same year, appearing in nine films in 1921, and another five in 1922. She appeared in 17 more films by the time she received what is today her best-known role, opposite Rudolph Valentino in the 1925 film Cobra.

Throughout the silent film era her career thrived. From 1925 through 1929 she appeared in twenty eight films, most often portraying the heroine. With the advent of sound film her career stalled, and she retired from acting in 1929.

== Personal life and death ==
In 1926 she met MGM director Robert Z. Leonard and they were married in Santa Barbara on June 8. Leonard and Olmstead remained married until he died in 1968.

After Leonard's death, Olmstead remained in the Los Angeles area, and died in Beverly Hills on January 18, 1975. She is interred at Glendale's Forest Lawn Memorial Park Cemetery, near her husband.

== Partial filmography ==
- Tipped Off (1920, Short) - Marion Ross
- The Driftin' Kid (1921, Short)
- Sweet Revenge (1921, Short)
- Kickaroo (1921, Short)
- The Fightin' Fury (1921, Short)
- Out o' Luck (1921, Short)
- The Big Adventure (1921) - Sally
- The Fighting Lover (1921) - Jean Forsdale
- The Fox (1921) - Stella Fraser
- Shadows of Conscience (1921) - Winifred Coburn
- The Scrapper (1922) - Eileen McCarthy
- The Adventures of Robinson Crusoe (1922, Serial)
- The Loaded Door (1922) - Molly Grainger
- Fighting Blood (1923) - Minor Role (uncredited)
- Trilby (1923) - Miss Bagot
- Cameo Kirby (1923) - Adele Randall
- George Washington Jr. (1924) - Dolly Johnson
- Ladies to Board (1924)
- A Girl of the Limberlost (1924) - Edith Carr
- Babbitt (1924) - Eunice Littlefield
- Lovers' Lane (1924) - Mary Larkin
- Empty Hands (1924) - Typsy
- Life's Greatest Game (1924) - Nora Malone
- The Monster (1925) - Betty Watson
- California Straight Ahead (1925) - Betty Browne
- Time, the Comedian (1925) - Ruth Dakon
- Cobra (1925) - Mary Drake
- Sweet Adeline (1926) - Adeline
- Torrent (1926) - Remedios
- Monte Carlo (1926) - Sally Roxford
- The Boob (1926) - Amy
- Puppets (1926) - Angela
- The Cheerful Fraud (1926) - Ann Kent
- Mr. Wu (1927) - Hilda Gregory
- The Callahans and the Murphys (1927) - Monica Murphy
- Becky (1927) - Nan Estabrook
- Buttons (1927) - Ruth Stratton
- A Woman Against the World (1928) - Bernice Crane, Bride
- The Cheer Leader (1928) - Jean Howard
- Sporting Goods (1928) - Alice Elliott
- Bringing Up Father (1928) - Ellen
- Green Grass Widows (1928) - Betty Worthing
- Hit of the Show (1928) - Kathlyn Carson
- Midnight Life (1928) - Betty Brown
- Sweet Sixteen (1928) - Patricia Perry
- The Passion Song (1928) - Elaine Van Ryn
- Hey Rube! (1928) - Lutie
- The Lone Wolf's Daughter (1929) - Helen Fairchild
- Sonny Boy (1929) - Mary
- The Time, the Place and the Girl (1929) - Mae Ellis
- The Show of Shows (1929) - Performer in 'Bicycle Built for Two' Number
