= The Law of the Snow Country =

1926 film

- Directed by: Paul Hurst
- Produced by: Bud Barsky
- Starring: Kenneth MacDonald; Jane Thomas; Noble Johnson
- Production company: Bud Barsky Corporation
- Release date: April 1, 1926
- Running time: 50 minutes
- Country: United States
- Languages: Silent; English intertitles

The Law of the Snow Country is a 1926 American silent Western film directed by Paul Hurst and starring Kenneth MacDonald, Jane Thomas and Noble Johnson.

== Cast ==
- Kenneth MacDonald as Sergeant Jimmy Burke
- Jane Thomas as Marie
- Noble Johnson as Martell
- William H. Strauss as Father Fajans
- Hazel Howell as The Blonde
- Bud Osborne as Pig Eye Perkins
- Ben Corbett as Jim Wolf
- Billy Cinders as Goofy Joe
