= Life's Greatest Game =

1924 film by Emory Johnson

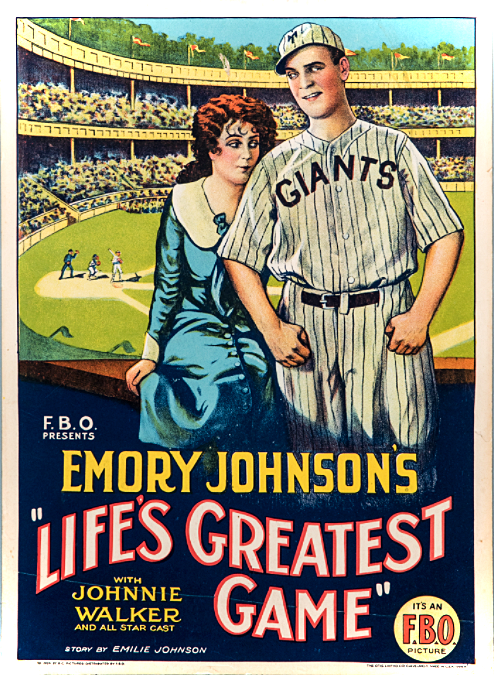
- Marquee Movie Poster
- Directed by: Emory Johnson; Asst Dir: Charles Watts; Asst Dir: Jerry Callahen
- Written by: Emilie Johnson
- Screenplay by: Emilie Johnson
- Produced by: Emory Johnson Prod
- Starring: Johnnie Walker; Tom Santschi; Gertrude Olmstead
- Cinematography: Paul Parry
- Edited by: Emory Johnson
- Distributed by: FBO
- Release date: October 5, 1924
- Running time: 7 reels 82 minutes
- Country: United States
- Languages: Silent film; English intertitles

Life's Greatest Game is a 1924 American silent melodrama directed by Emory Johnson. FBO released the film in October 1924. The film's "All-Star" cast included Johnnie Walker, Tom Santschi, Jane Thomas, David Kirby, and Gertrude Olmstead. Emilie Johnson, Johnson's mother, wrote both the story and screenplay. She was inspired by the 1919 World Series Black Sox Scandal. Life's Greatest Game was the sixth film in Johnson's eight-picture contract with FBO.

The plot unfolds as Jack Donovan, the pitcher for the Chicago Cubs, refuses to throw a game for gambler Mike Moran. Moran retaliates by breaking up Donovan's family. Believing that his wife and son died in the sinking of an ocean liner, Donovan remains in baseball and, 18 years later, becomes the manager of the New York Giants. Senior does not know that his family did not perish in the shipwreck, and his son, Jack Jr., is a grown man and star baseball player for a college team. The Giants hire Jackie Jr. to play for the club. Fate brings them together for a crucial world series game, just as Jackie Jr. discovers his birth father.

On September 28, 1924, FBO premiered Life's Greatest Game at the Cameo Theatre in New York City. In a serendipitous twist of fate, the Giants started a two-game series with the Phillies on September 27, 1924. The winner would become the National League champion. Before the start of the game, a Giants player approached a Phillies shortstop. He offers money to avoid "bearing down hard" during the game. Thus, a real baseball scandal occurred during the premiere of a film about a baseball scandal.

The 1924 World Series started on Saturday, October 4, 1924. (Note: The Washington Senators won the actual 1924 World Series over the New York Giants with a seventh-game extra-innings thriller. Recently, newsreel footage was discovered in Worcester, Massachusetts of the 1924 series. The Library of Congress Packard Campus for Audio Visual Conservation preserved this footage. (Check "External links")) They officially released Life's Greatest Game one day later on Sunday, October 5, 1924.

== Plot ==
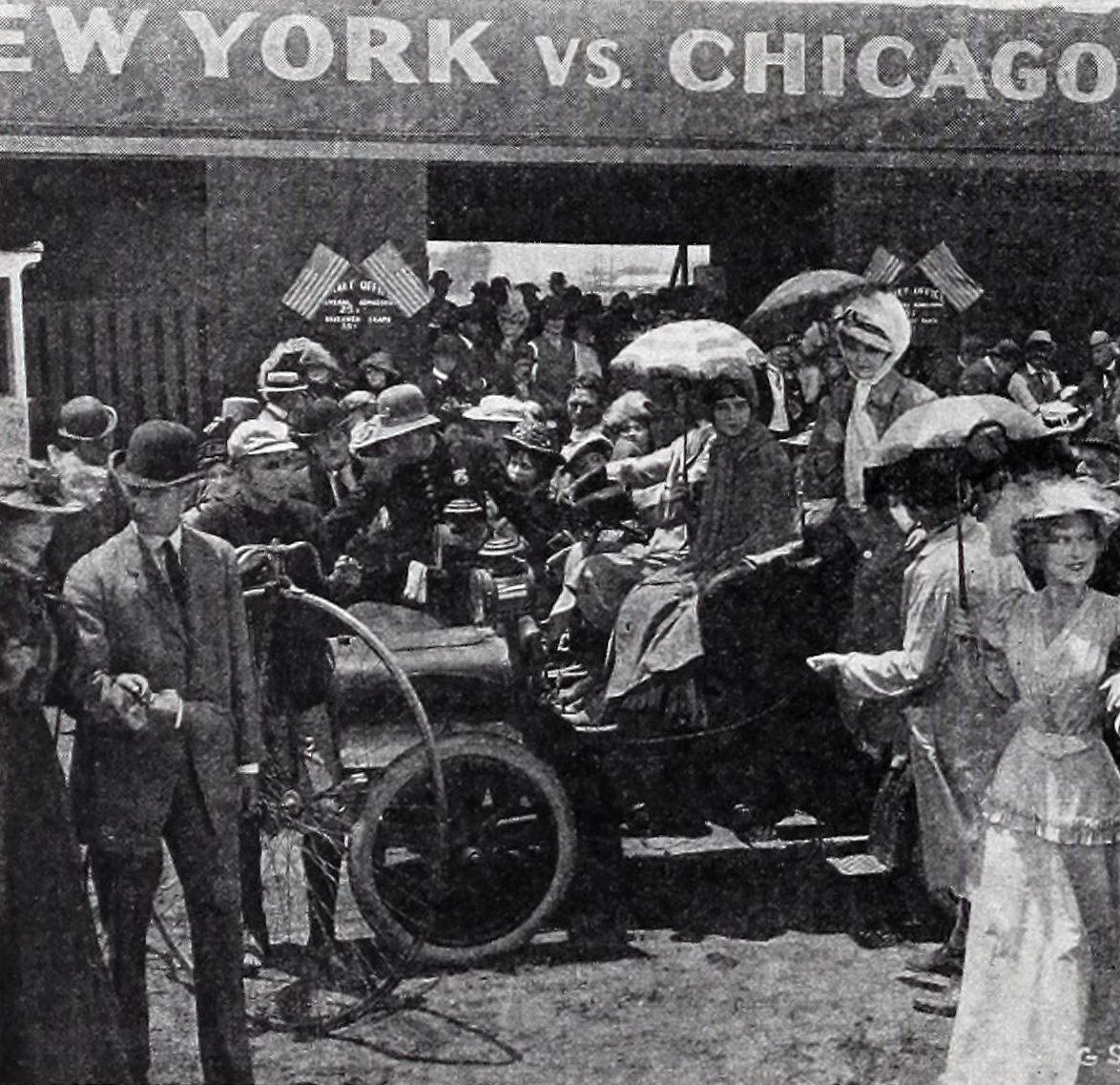
The crowd gathers before the big game

In the Fall of 1906, a large crowd of baseball fans attired in period garb gathered at the front gate of Chicago Cub stadium. They plan to attend the Chicago Cubs and the New York Giants game. The fans also want to watch Cub's superstar pitcher - Jack Donovan. Before the scheduled start of the game, other events unfold. Mike Moran is the proprietor of the local pool hall and a notorious gambler. He also is envious of Donovan's beautiful young wife, Mary, and unable to understand why she married Donovan. Moran has a plan to win a large sum of money. He wants to bet on the Giants against the heavily favored cubs. He secretly meets Donovan and offers him $5,000 to throw the series. Jack is deeply disturbed that anybody would offer him money to fix a game and angrily storms out of the room. Since Donovan balked at his moneymaking scheme, Moran seeks revenge.

The day of the big game arrives, and Jack is pitching. While on the mound, he sees Mary and Jackie sitting beside Mike Moran. His self-assurance falters, and he loses the game. Still seeking revenge for Donovan's refusal, Moran breaks into Donovan's house. He plants a fictitious note addressed to Jack from Mary. After the game, Donovan returns home and finds the place deserted; he discovers a letter thrown on the floor. It reads:

Well, I am glad you ended this pretense and come back to me.
Now, my little boy, Jackie, can openly call me "Daddy."
I will call for you Thursday before your husband returns from the game,
and together, we can make all arrangements for our get-away.
Yours, as always, Mike.

Mary returns home and sees Jack consumed with rage. Donovan storms out of the house seeking Moran. After he finds him, the two have a fierce fistfight and Moran is thrashed by Donovan. Moran pleads for mercy and confesses he wrote the note. Donovan returns home only to find his wife and son are gone. After days go by, Donovan discovers his estranged wife and son are departing on a voyage to Europe. He rushes to the embarkation dock just in time to see the trans-Atlantic liner steaming out of sight.

Donovan does not understand that Moran is still seeking revenge and has booked passage on the same ship. Moran booked a compartment next to Mary and Jackie. Days into the voyage, a heavy fog envelops the boat. Moran can control his passions no longer. He breaks into Mary's cabin and tries to force his affection on her. During their struggle, there was a thundering crash. The vessel has hit an iceberg. While many passengers lose their lives, Mary and Jackie Jr. survive. Despite a desperate attempt to save himself, Moran drowns. After reading the newspaper, Jack believes his family drowned. He overlooks a news item on page 6, publishing a list of survivors. Because of his loss, Jack Donovan will devote his life to baseball.

In 1924, 18 years have elapsed since the tragedy, and Jack Donovan is the new manager of the New York Giants. Jackie Donovan Jr. is a grown man and college student. Jackie is also a star pitcher on his college baseball team. Even though Jackie is an ace pitcher, he has pledged to his mother never to play professional baseball. Mary Donovan's finances take a turn for the worse, and Mary can no longer support her son's college costs. A New York Giants scout recently watched Jackie pitch a game and offered him a rookie contract. Jackie declined the offer because of his pledge to his mother. His mother's financial woes changed everything, and Jackie signed the Giant's contracts.

Jackie meets the manager of the Giants. He does not know the manager is his father. After several fortunate circumstances, Jackie Jr. discovered the Giant's manager was his father. After a startling discovery, Jackie keeps his discovery to himself and exacts revenge on a day of his choosing against the man who abandoned his mother and him. The world series arrives, and the Giants face the Yankees for baseball dominance. Jack Donovan lets the rookie pitch and sub as a pinch hitter in the crucial seventh game. Jackie believes the time has arrived, tells his father his true identity, and threatens to throw the game. In the end, Jackie's integrity wins out. He pitches a flawless inning and hits the game-winning home run. The Giants win the series.

Jackie informs Jack Sr. that his mother is seriously ill and needs help and invites Jack Sr to go with him back home. The estranged couple reunites, and Jackie becomes engaged to his sweetheart, Nora.

== Cast ==
Actor	Role
Tom Santschi	Jack Donovan
Jane Thomas	Mary Donovan
Johnnie Walker	Jackie Donovan Jr. (age 20)
Gertrude Olmstead	Nora Malone
David Kirby	Mike Moran
Dicky Brandon	Jack Donovan Jr. (age 3)
Tommy Hicks	Fat Kid (uncredited)
Also including:
600 spectators in 1906 costume
group of clever child actors
various other minor characters
Special Appearances by:
Commissioner of Baseball	Kenesaw Mountain Landis
National League President	John Heydler

== Production ==
Melodrama is our meat - but it's high-class melodrama. It allowed the public to weep and sympathize with the handsome hero and the beautiful heroine. We don't want to label our pictures, we must make pictures that appeal to all.

— Joe Kennedy
Member FBO board of directors,
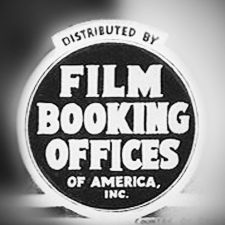
FBO distribution logo from 1926

Film Booking Offices of America (FBO) was an energetic, independent American silent era film studio. The company released around 110 features and shorts a year. The company focused on producing low-budget films emphasizing first-class westerns, action films, romantic melodramas, and comedy shorts. The company mainly distributed its pictures to small-town venues and independent theater chains, which changed their pictures three times a week. FBO would make their pictures appeal to every member of the American family.

The average cost per FBO production was $50,000 to $75,000 equivalent to $961,730 to $1,442,594 in 2021 compared to the Major film studios which could spend five times as much to produce a movie.

FBO also produced and distributed a limited number of big-budget features labeled "Gold Bond" or "Special" productions. Emory Johnson's eight films for FBO were all specials.

In 1923, Emilie and Emory Johnson signed a contract extension with FBO. The contract was for 2 1/2 years. The agreement stipulated Emory was to make eight attractions for FBO. The agreement specified that his previous four films would count toward the total. FBO also agreed to invest two and a half million dollars (In today's money – equivalent to $40,472,167 in 2021) on the remaining four films. Another part of the new contract stipulated – "The contract also provides that Emory Johnson's mother, Mrs. Emilie Johnson, shall prepare all of the stories and write all the scripts for the Johnson attractions in addition to assisting her son in filming the productions."

=== Pre production ===
==== Casting ====
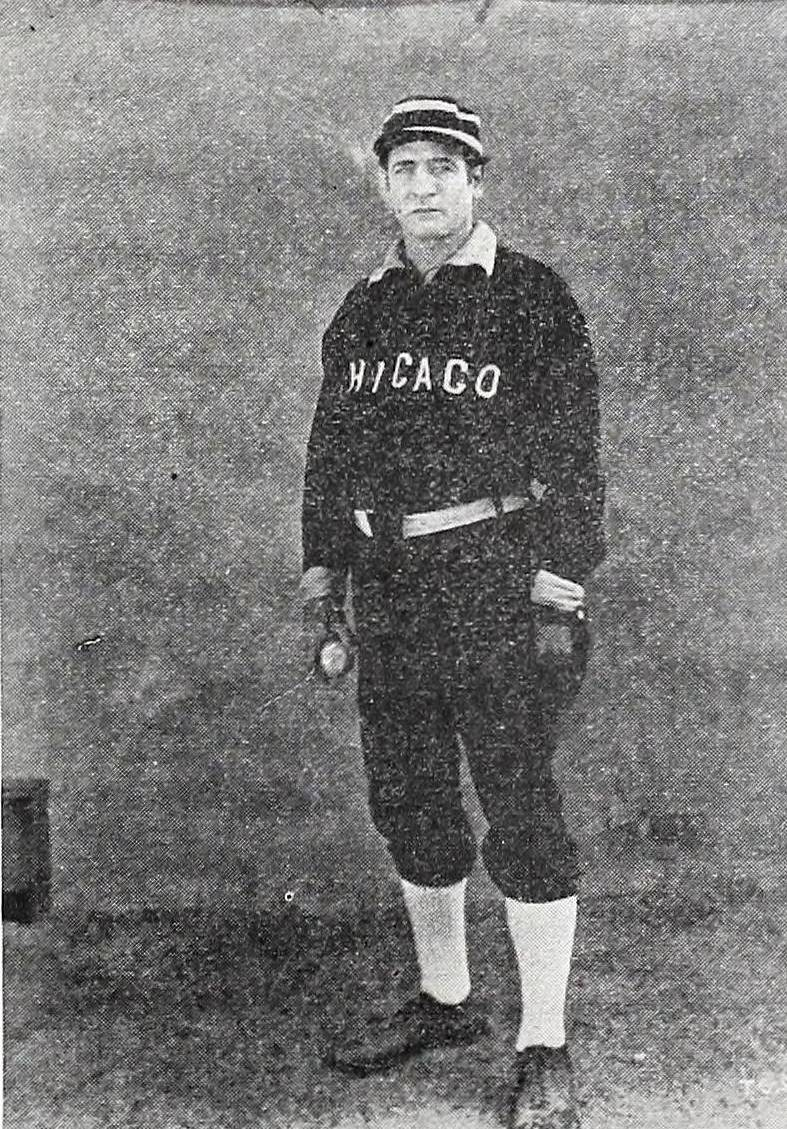
Tom Santschi 1906 Cubs Pitcher

- Tom Santschi (1878–1931) was born on October 14, 1878, in Crystal City, Missouri. He was an established star when the 45 year-old actor played Jack Donovan. He had acted in hundreds of movies by the time she starred in this film. Tom Santschi grew up in Kokomo, Indiana, where he started playing baseball. While attending high school, he became a pitcher but soon transferred to the outfield because of his hitting prowess. The athletic Santschi eventually went to Purdue University, where he played in the outfield but occasionally tried his hand on the pitcher's mound. Both Santschi and Johnnie Walker loved the game they played in their youth. Each admits they were happy to accept a role in this film. Tom was six feet one inch tall, curly brown hair and piercing blue eyes. The bulk of his movie career was making westerns. AFI credits the actor/director with 103 Titles in Filmography.
- Jane Thomas (1899–1976) was born on May 31, 1899, in Chicago, Illinois. When Johnson began searching for a feminine lead in this production, he tried to find a woman possessing Gibson Girl flowing hair. He wanted this actress to look and dress like a typical woman in 1906. He then needed her to age 18 years to play Jackie's mother. In Hollywood, most actresses and flappers wore their hair in a Shingle bob. Unable to find his leading woman with the right hairstyle, Johnson turned his attention to the East Coast and selected Jane Thomas living in New York. She was a seasoned movie veteran and had the look Johnson desired. They put her on a train, and she headed West. She was an established star when the 24-the year-old actress played Mary Donovan. AFI credits the actress with 26 Titles in Filmography.

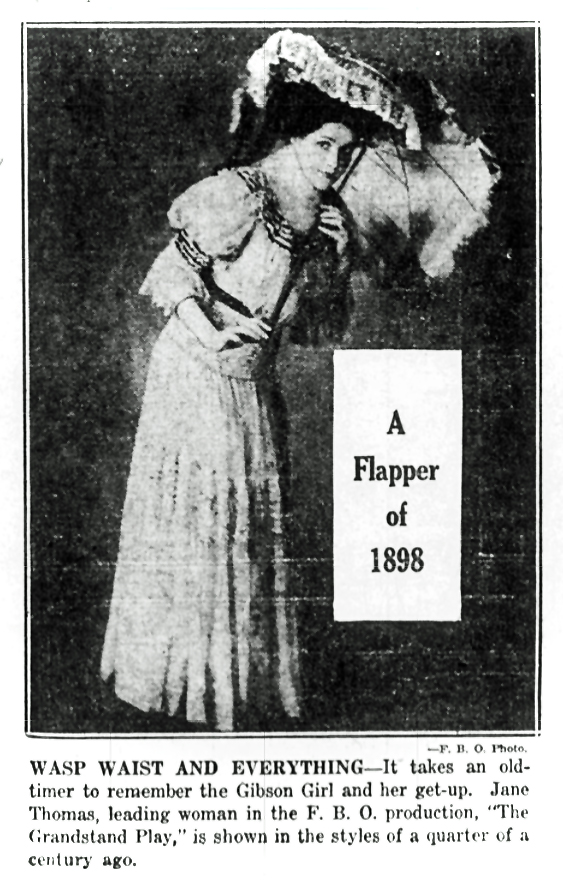
Jane Thomas as Mary Donovan

- Johnnie Walker (1894–1949) was born on January 7, 1894, in New York City, New York. He was an established star when the 30 year-old actor played 20-year-old Jackie Donovan. Walker learned the game on the sandlots of New York and spent most of his early life playing baseball. He still loves baseball and regularly attends major league ball games on the East coast. America's most famous son played ball at Fordham college. Johnnie is five feet eleven inches tall, with black hair and blue eyes. AFI credits the actor with 48 Titles in Filmography. Johnnie Walker also became a Director and movie Producer.
- Gertrude Olmstead (Also Known As Gertrude Olmsted) (1904–1975) was born on November 13, 1904, in LaSalle, Illinois. While she was still a student at LaSalle-Peru High School, she won the 1920 Chicago Herald-Examiner beauty contest. She became "The Spirit of America" in the July 1920 Elks parade in Chicago. Her win led to a movie contract with Universal. She had her first credited role in The Fox starring Harry Carey, released in July 1921. She was an established star when the 19 year-old actress played Nora Malone in this movie. Olmstead married director Robert Z. Leonard in June 1926 and made her last picture: The Time, the Place and the Girl released July 8, 1929. She remained happily married until her husband's died in 1968. She was five feet two inches, with light brown hair and grey eyes. AFI credits the actress with 45 Titles in Filmography.
- David (Red) Kirby (1880–1954) was born in St. Louis, Missouri, on July 16, 1880. He was an established star when the 44 year-old actor played Mike Moran. He had acted in hundreds of movies by the time she starred in this film. David was five feet eleven inches tall, with brown hair and brown eyes. AFI credits the actor/director with 33 Titles in Filmography.
- Dicky Brandon née Richard Ellison Brandon (1919 – 2010) was 5 years old when he played the role of a 3-year-old Jack Donovan Jr. He was one of the many child actors in the American movie industry. This role was one of his earliest parts in a movie. This movie is one of his six listed on AFI. He had previously acted in the May 1924 production of The Spirit of the USA.

==== Director ====
- Emory Johnson was 30 years old when he directed this film. Johnson, during his directorial career at FBO, had acquired monikers like the "Master of Melodrama," "King of Exploitation," and "Hero of the Working Class." This melodrama would be added to the working-class list. Johnson signed an 8-picture contract with FBO. This film was the sixth film honoring the terms of that contract. All of his previous five FBO films had all been financially successful, including In the Name of the Law, The Third Alarm, The West~Bound Limited, The Mailman and The Spirit of the USA. Johnson appears as a member of the 1907 crowd scenes used as early background shots for this film. (Note: We liked the reminiscent old-fashioned scenes where the gowns and accessories of a past day are strikingly depicted. The old high-wheeler, the bicycles, and the puff-sleeved dresses all won admiration. Several close-ups reveal the director in the grandstands. Emory Johnson, though not listed, gives one of the best bits in the picture. R.E. Copeland)

Another factor explaining the lackluster reception of this film was Johnson's personal life. Emory Johnson married Ella Hall in 1917. By 1924, their marriage was on the rocks, and Ella filed for divorce. The conflict resulted in their first separation. Ella cited the main conflict between her and Emory's overbearing mother. A more detailed explanation of Johnson's marital woes are explained on this page click here.

==== Themes ====
What the world needs most today is a better understanding of humanity. What it wants are love and human sympathy. Thus, I have set out to make love the theme of all my productions. I have sought to show how whole families are lifted from sorrow to contentment by love and kindly sediments.

— Emory Johnson
Director,

Baseball is the foundation of this film, but Love is its heart. Emory Johnson's glorification of public servants would become the perfect subject material for all of his FBO. Special productions. According to Johnson, all of his working-class melodramas revolved around one central theme: love. Thus, everlasting love, interwoven with dramatic themes of devotion, family, and integrity, is intertwined throughout the fabric of the Life's Greatest Game: the love between Jack and Mary, as well as their love for their son were challenged by the machinations of a revenge-seeking gambler, revealing the Donovan couple's everlasting love and willingness to sacrifice for their son; their reunion after an 18-year separation then showed that their love never faltered.

==== Screenplay ====
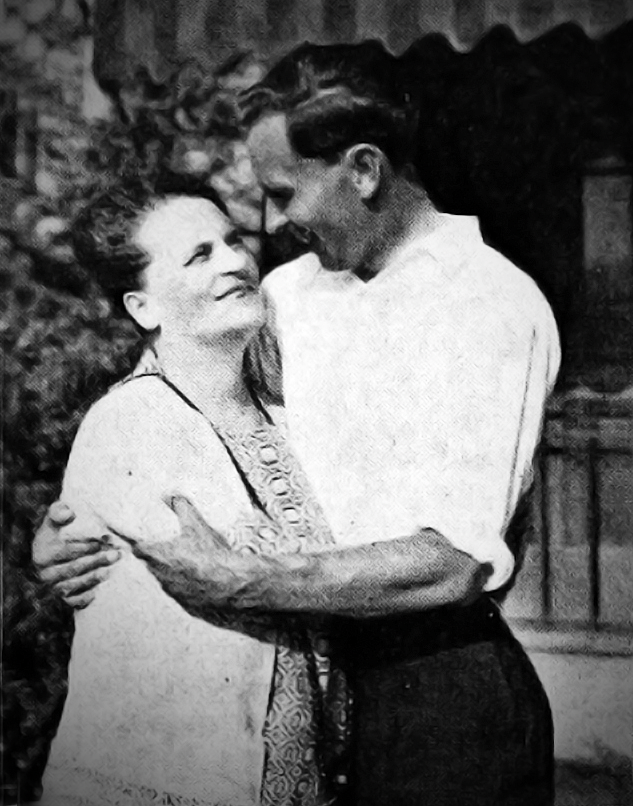
Emilie and Emory

The greatest appeal in pictures is not in extravagant spectacles, historical pageants, or adaptation of fairy tales. I think the straightforward, clean, wholesome Melodrama will always have the choice corner in the hearts of the American public.

— Writer Emilie Johnson,

Emilie Johnson (1867–1941) was 57 years old when she penned the story for this film. She would also create the screenplay for "Life's Greatest Game." Emilie Johnson wrote most of the stories and screenplays her son, Emory Johnson, used for his successful and prosperous career directing melodramas.

Emilie Johnson was born on June 3, 1867, in Gothenburg, Västra Götaland, Sweden. after emigrating to America; she married Alfred Jönsson. Their only son was born in 1894 - Alfred Emory Johnson.

In the 1920s, Emilie and Emory Johnson developed one of the unique relationships in the annals of Hollywood. Johnson and her son became famous as Hollywood's only mother-son directing/writing team. They usually worked side by side before production started and then on the movie sets after filming began. The decade saw the mother-son team develop into the most financially successful directing and writing team in motion picture history.

Emilie Johnson wrote stories about lunch pail characters living paycheck-to-paycheck like law enforcement officers, firefighters, mail carriers, railroad engineers, patriots, baseball players, and newspaper press operators. The Johnson team felt their human-interest stories would be relatable on the silver screen, and her son brought them to the screen in epic melodramas. (Note: Emory Johnson said the following about his mother: My mother, Mrs. Emily Johnson, has that invaluable ability to cram human emotions into a photoplay. She has the ripened, matured viewpoint of the average mother. Sometimes I think mothers would make the greatest of all scenario writers because they have a particular human slant on life. Women are as well equipped as men to take up the important work of writing for the screen is already established by the success of many women writers who have fashioned their stories directly for the screen. The average woman has a deep and well-rounded understanding of life. She has little human qualities developed to a far greater degree than the average man.) The Johnson team continued producing melodramas until the late 1920s. By the early 1930s, their successes and box-office magic had ended.

=== Filming ===
==== Exteriors ====
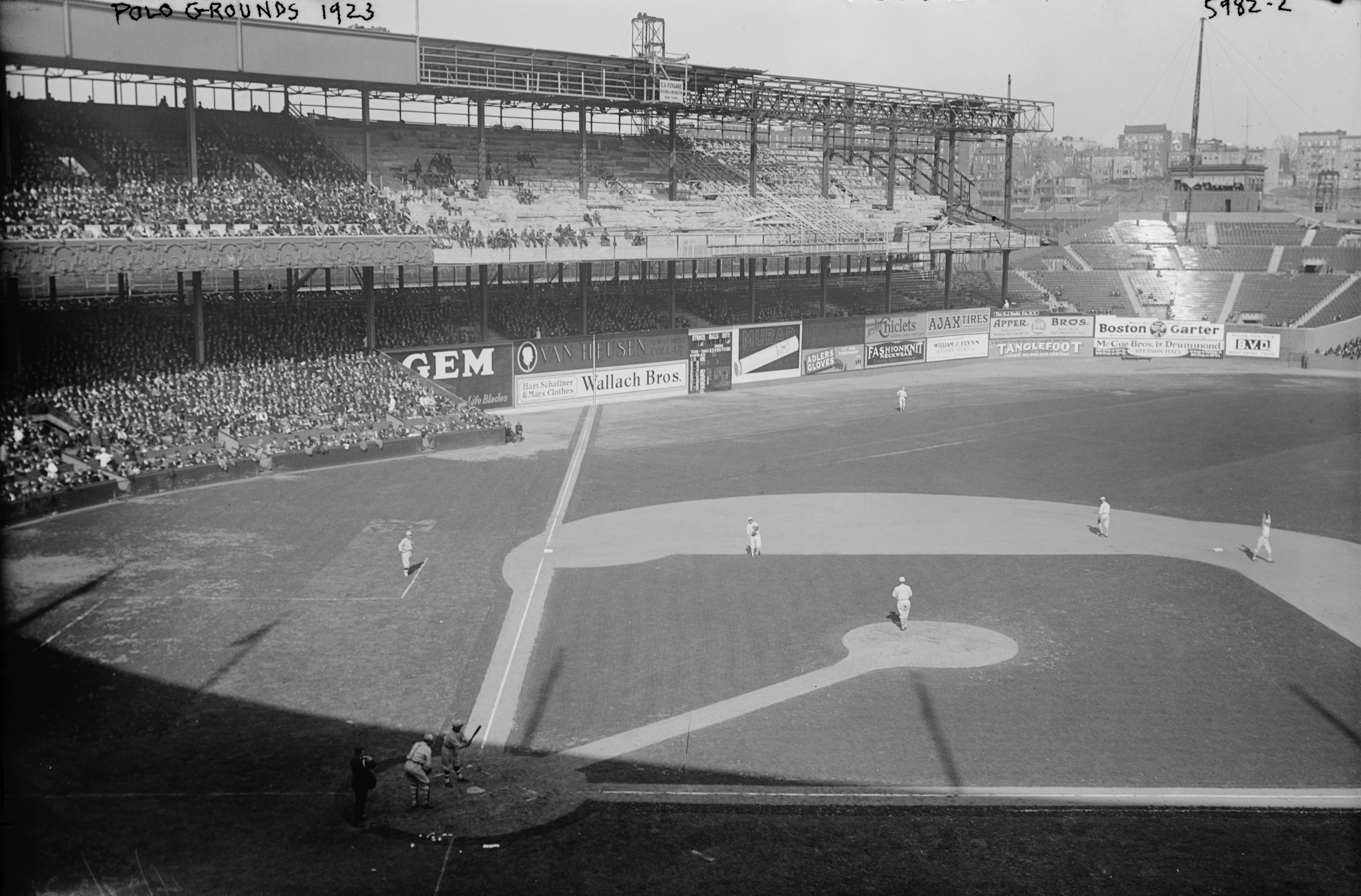
The Polo Grounds in 1923

- The following ballparks were used for Location shooting for this film:
1. New York Polo Grounds – is the home park of the New York Giants with a Seating capacity of 43,000 fans. The 1924 World Series played three games in this park.
2. Washington Park (Los Angeles) – the home of the Los Angeles Angels playing in the Pacific Coast League from 1911 through 1925. It had a seating capacity of 12,000.
3. Oaks Park (Oakland Baseball Park) – is the home field of the Oakland Oaks, members of the Pacific Coast League. It opened in 1913 and had a seating capacity of 11,000.
- To recreate the sinking of the ocean liner, Johnson contacted Commander Edward Parry, a friend in the Pacific coast Naval authority, to help him reconstruct the event. Along with Commander Parry, Johnson, and his associates found several survivors of the ill-fated Titanic. The director interviewed three Titanic survivors to get a firsthand version of that dreadful night. Then Parry and Johnson spent several days developing construction plans to build the towering replica of an iceberg. Construction crews finished the project, and the results were spectacular. Some critics observed the sinking alone was worth the price of admission.

==== Interiors ====
FBO had studios at 860 North Gower Street, Los Angeles California.

==== Timetable ====
◆ This Schedule is pieced together from multiple sources ◆
Month	Day	Year	Event	Ref
Oct	1–9	1919	The Black Sox Scandal 1919 World Series happened five years before the 1924 world series.	
May	18	1924	Emory Johnson released his fifth film for FBO, The Spirit of the USA.	
Aug	03	1924	The Film Daily Emory Johnson's next picture will be The Grandstand Play.	
Aug		1924	American Cinematographer Paul P. Perry, ASC, is photographing Emory Johnson's latest production, "Play Ball."	
Sep	02	1924	The Film Daily Emory Johnson's The Grandstand Play will have a sequence in it showing baseball as it was played 25 years ago.	
Sep	09	1924	The Film Daily The title of Emory Johnson's next for FBO has been changed from The Grandstand Play to Life's Greatest Game.	
Sep	20	1924	The Moving Picture World units busy shooting baseball scenes for Life's Greatest Game in Oakland, California	
Sep	23	1924	The Moving Picture World Emory Johnson started the third week of filming, implying filming started August 23, 1924	
Sep	27	1924	Motion Picture Herald Paul P. Perry, ASC has finished filming The Grandstand Play, Emory Johnson's latest production.	
Sep	27	1924	Before the first game of a two-game series with the Philadelphia Phillies on September 27, 1924 New York Giants' Outfielder Jimmy O'Connell approached Heinie Sand, the Phillies' shortstop, asking if $500 (equivalent to $7,906 in 2021) would be enough for him to avoid "bearing down hard" against the Giants. Giants' coach Cozy Dolan was also in on it. The Giants won 5-1 and clinched the National League pennant.	
Sep	28	1924	Billboard Life's Greatest Game premieres at New York's Cameo Theater amidst the blossoming Giant's baseball scandal	
Oct	01	1924	Commissioner of Baseball Kenesaw Mountain Landis banned New York Giants player Jimmy O'Connell and coach Cozy Dolan over a bribery scandal. They were charged with offering Philadelphia Phillies shortstop Heinie Sand $500 to throw a game on September 27 to help the Giants win the National League pennant.	
Oct	4–10	1924	The 1924 World Series between the New York Giants and the Washington Senators was played on seven consecutive days starting Saturday, October 4, 1924, through Friday, October 10, 1924	
Oct	05	1924	Life's Greatest Game is officially released for bookings	

==== Working title ====
When films enter production, they need the means to reference the project. A Working title is assigned to the project. A Working Title can also be named an Alternate title. In many cases, a working title will become the release title.
Working titles are used primarily for two reasons:

- An official title for the project has not been determined
- A non-descript title to mask the real reason for making the movie.

The working title for this film was - "The Grandstand Play." In later September 1924, it was changed to its actual film title - Life's Greatest Game.

=== Post production ===
Post-production is a crucial step in filmmaking, transforming the raw footage into the finished product. It requires skilled professionals working together to create a film that meets the director's vision and engages audiences. This film's final length is listed at seven reels (7,010 feet) with a running time of 82 minutes.

This film opens with an event in 1906, including a baseball game between the Chicago Cubs and the New York Giants. To add some realism to the game, segments from the 1924 Hal Roach comedy The Battling Orioles were cross cut into the movie depiction of the 1906 game. The movie link is displayed in "External links."

Newsreel footage from the 1923 World Series between the New York Yankees and New York Giants was intercut into the final version. The newsreel film is considered lost.

==== Studios ====
As mentioned previously, Johnson signed an 8-picture contract with FBO. This film was the sixth film honoring the terms of that contract. In March 1926, Johnson released The Non-Stop Flight. This was the eighth and final film of his contractual obligation to FBO. It would be Emory and Emilie Johnson's last film for FBO. In April 1926, FBO decided to let Emory and Emilie Johnson's contracts expire. There were no published reasons for the separation. Emory Johnson's directorial career consisted of 13 films - 11 were silent, and two were Talkies.

== Release and reception ==
"FBO policy was to produce pictures for Main Street's entertainment rather than the more sophisticated broadway tastes."

— Joe Kennedy
Member FBO board of directors,

Melodrama films have plots appealing to the raised passions of the audience. They concentrate on family issues, direct their attention to a victim's character, and develop the themes of duty and love. The format shows the characters working through their struggles with persistence, sacrificial deeds, and courage. Movie critics and theater owners often use the following expressions to describe the movies they are reviewing or showing.
Terms used in reviewing silent movie melodrama

=== New York premiere ===
On September 28, 1924, Film Booking Offices of America premiered Life's Greatest Game at the B.S. Moss Cameo Theatre in New York City. The convention of holding a world premiere for a forthcoming film on Broadway was a widespread practice for large movie producers. The eastern critics put a fine point on FBO's stated Main Street philosophy. The mainstream publications thrashed the film.

==== New York premiere reviews ====
After previewing the film at the New York's Cameo Theatre, prominent New York magazine reviewers were unanimously displeased with what they saw.

- Fred reviewed the movie in the October 8, 1924 issue of the "Variety," and wrote a particularly scathing review stating:
  "Decidedly wearying picture. It's much too long and could stand cutting. Whatever the reason FBO booked this film into a Broadway theater, it doesn't appear on the screen. The picture itself does not qualify for an extraordinary rental. For the baseball shots of the big series, those taken by newsreels have been pieced, in which the shots with the principals of the picture's cast. The matching is not very well done. Twenty minutes cut out and it would be a far better feature."
- A snarky movie critic reviewed the movie in the October 6, 1924 issue of the "Time," and wrote:
  "The story deals mainly with baseball, past, and present, and includes the sinking of the Titanic. The old ball player's son survives, returns after 20 years to pitch the Giants to victory in the World Series, and shames the father for deserting the family in 1904. Probably one of the ten worst pictures. The heroine even wears curls down her back."
- H.E. Shumlin reviewed the movie in the October 18, 1924 issue of the "Billboard," and wrote:
  "It's hokum, but it's terrible hokum. In his previous masterpieces. Mr. Johnson has held closely to the time-honored principle of handing out large gobs of action and homely sentiment. In this film, he hasn't the logical opportunity for much action, so he has to interpolate a shipwreck, which is undoubtedly the most artificial, childish, ineffectual thing these weary eyes have ever witnessed. Now it is only yesterday we were all saying that if a picture pleases the women, it s O. K. And here is FBO.—and Emory Johnson of all people! —making a Picture about baseball, than which there is probably nothing the well-known gentler sex cares less about."

=== Official release ===
This film was copyrighted to R-C (Robertson-Cole) Pictures Corp on October 5, 1924, with registration number LP20660. The registered copyrights for FBO Films were with their original British owners. FBO was the official name of the film-distributing operation for Robertson-Cole Pictures Corp. Joseph P. Kennedy Sr. would clear this up later. (Note: The copyright was filed with U.S. Copyright Office and entered into the record as shown: LIFE'S GREATEST GAME. Released by FBO 1924. 7 Reels Credits: Director, Emory Johnson; story, Emilie Johnson. R-C Pictures Corp,. 5Oct24; LP20660.)

On October 5, 1924, they released the film for bookings.

=== Advertising ===
Nat G. Rothstein was the publicity, advertising, and exploitation director at FBO. He planned extensive, high-powered exploitation for this film. He intended to exploit this film more than previous Emory Johnson films.

Rothstein's recommendations included:

- "Life's Greatest Game" will be dedicated to the Baseball League of each city in which it is shown, thus assuring the exhibitor of cooperation and help from all baseball fans when the production is booked."
- Babe Ruth has promised his services to exploit the picture, while many tie-ups have already been affected.
- Another stunt Rothstein contemplated is a huge baseball, fully six feet in diameter, inscribed by prominent baseball officials, to be rolled from Los Angeles to New York. There were no recorded sightings of the giant baseball.

Other magazine articles pointed out even more opportunities for exploitation:

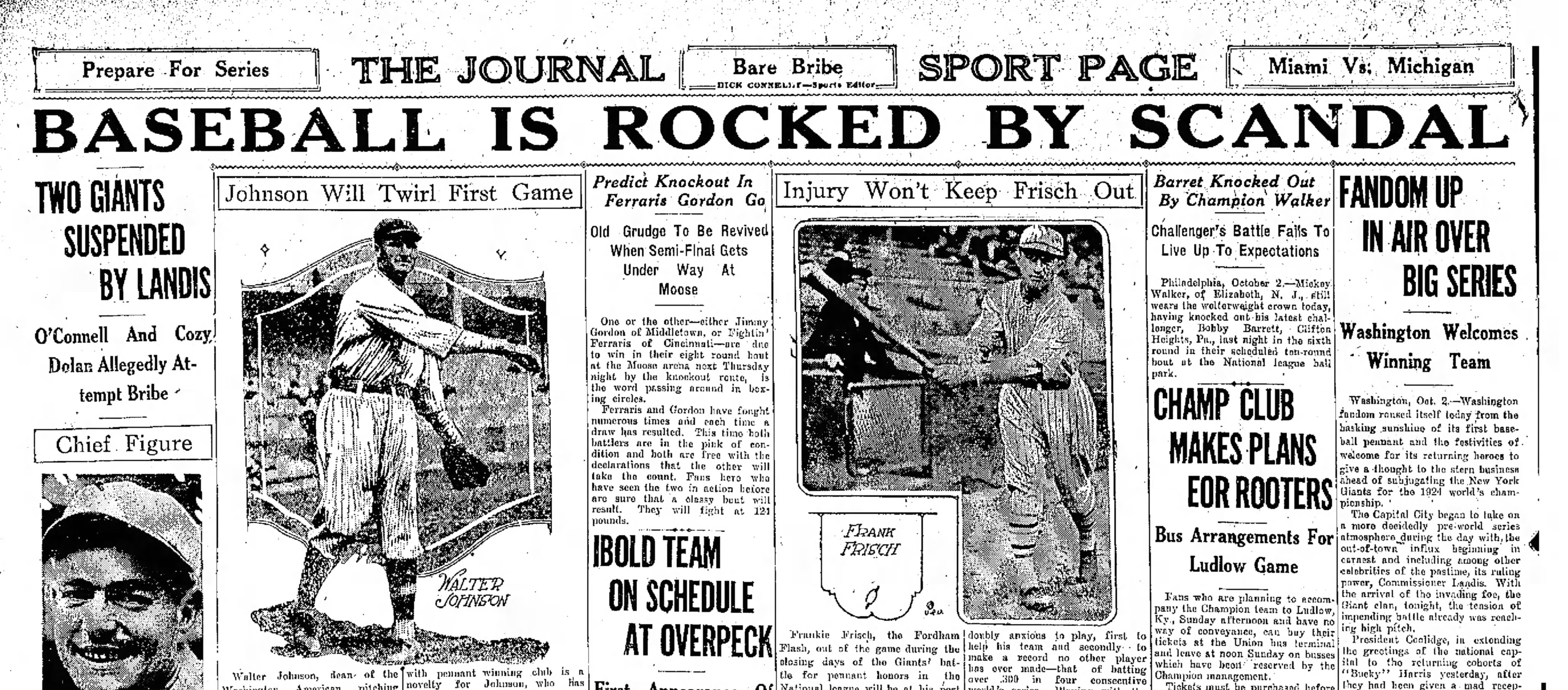
October 2, 1924 Headline

- "The newspapers are shrieking the news of this expose and scandal in their boldest type. Baseball editorials are being written by the most prominent minds of the day. With all the sensational stories about the baseball scandal occupying the greater portions of thousands of newspapers, Life's Greatest Game should prove the greatest moneymaker any exhibitor ever booked since this industry began!"
- "The sensational scandal and expose of dishonesty and crookedness discovered in Major League Baseball create an unparalleled opportunity for exhibitors to tie up all the tremendous publicity this scandal is creating with Emory Johnson's FBO. production."
- "Life's Greatest Game" as a picture, and to prove to theatre-goers that this picture is a gigantic factor in the fight for honest baseball."
- "A special four-page section has been prepared by the FBO publicity department for insertion into the 24-page press book, which is jammed full of novel, snappy advertising, and exploitation ideas. The four-page special insert is brimming was suggestions whereby exhibitors can best take advantage of the baseball scandal."

=== Reviews ===
==== Critical response ====
Small towns were FBO mainstays versus big cities.

- C. S. Sewell reviewed the movie in the October 11, 1924 issue of The Moving Picture World, stating:
  "It belongs to the class of human interest melodramas of the old school in which attention has been concentrated on building up situations that strike home because of their heart appeal. The baseball scenes are well handled, and even though there is practically no suspense in the climax - Sophisticated persons will probably consider some of the titles and situations to be theatrical and overdrawn."
- A movie critic reviewed the movie in the February 12, 1925 issue of the Times Recorder published in Zanesville, Ohio (pop 29k), stating:
  "The biggest of the Johnson pictures; which is taking in a lot of territories when such films as "The Third Alarm" and "The Spirit of the U.S.A. are considered. It is unquestionably the best picture the johnsons have made, according to astute critics who have seen it."
- A movie critic reviewed the movie in the May 16, 1925 issue of "The Morning Union" published in Grass Valley, California (pop 4,006) and wrote a review quaint by today's standards:
  "The story pays a fine tribute to the sterling honesty and innate sportsmanship of the national game, but does not touch too heavily on, the technical angles of the sport and permits women and children to enjoy it just as much as the men. There is plenty of romance of the right sort to make it absorbing, and the human interest keeps you glued to your seat until the end"

==== Audience response ====
Audience reviews were mixed depending on the size of the venue. Many larger moviehouse owners rented this movie based on Emory Johnson's reputation and were disappointed with their turnout. Other small-town theater owners thought they had a sure-fire gold mine since Emory Johnson's production.

- Roy E. Cline Osage Theatre (200 seats) Osage, Oklahoma population 250
  This is a fair feature, but no drawing power. Not the picture that the other Johnson pictures are. The tone is good. Sunday, yes. Not much audience appeal. Small town class town of 250. Admission 10–25.
- John W. Hawkins Capitol theatre New Bedford, Massachusetts population 121,000
  A good melodrama woven around big-league baseball. Not up to the standard of Emory Johnson's previous productions because its appeal is limited to those who take some interest in baseball. Business good, but not as good as we expected General patronage.
- Robert W Hines Hines theater (150 seats) Loyalton, South Dakota population 115
  This is a dandy picture. It sure has the drawing power. This is 100% picture. You can't go wrong with buying this picture. Tone good. Sunday yes. Audience appeal 95%. Farm and city class admission 15 to 30.

== Related baseball facts ==
- Jack Spears cited life's Greatest Game in his 1968 Films in Review article on baseball movies states: FBO's life's greatest game is one of the few filmed to take a realistic look at baseball. It traces two generations are professional players by emphasizing the rank-and-file player rather than the big star. It makes baseball more human.
- In 2020, ESPN named the 1924 World Series as the third greatest World Series of all time.
- In the 1923 World Series, the New York Yankees beat the New York Giants in six games. This would be the first of the Yankees' 27 World Series championships. This newsreel footage was intercut with actual film footage of Life's Greatest Game.
- The average salary of ballplayers in 1924 was $6,000 (equivalent to $94,870 in 2021)

== Preservation status ==
According to the Library of Congress website, this film has a status of - No holdings located in archives; thus, it is presumed all copies of this film are lost. (Note: With every foot of film that is lost, we lose a link to our culture, to the world around us, to each other, and ourselves – Martin Scorsese, filmmaker A report by Library of Congress film historian and archivist David Pierce estimates that: around 75% of original silent-era films have perished; 14% of the 10,919 silent films released by major studios exist in their original 35 mm or other formats; 11% survive only in full-length foreign versions or film formats of lesser image quality.; Many silent-era films did not survive for reasons as explained on this Wikipedia page.)

== Gallery ==
Cast, Director, and Special Appearances
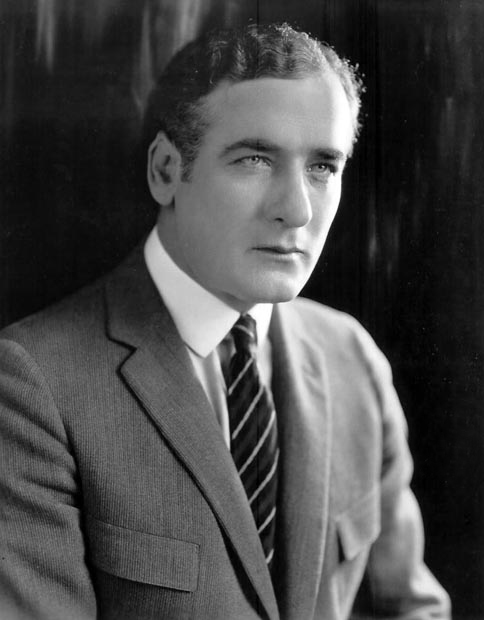
Tom Santschi
Jack Donovan

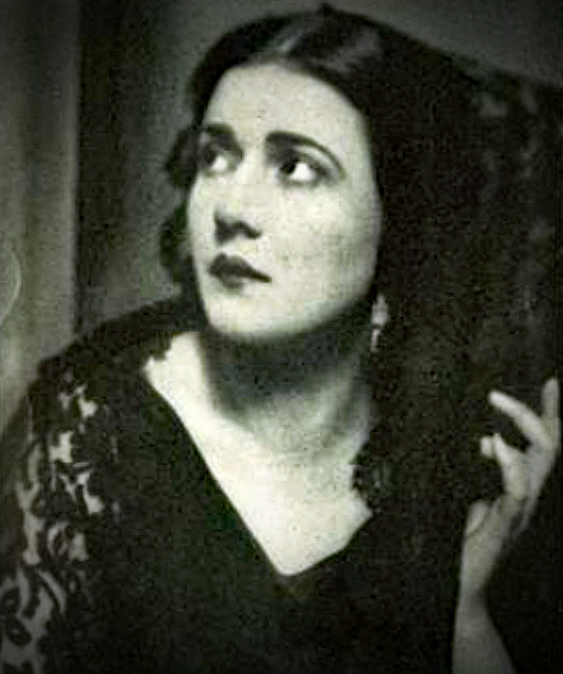
Jane Thomas
Mary Donovan

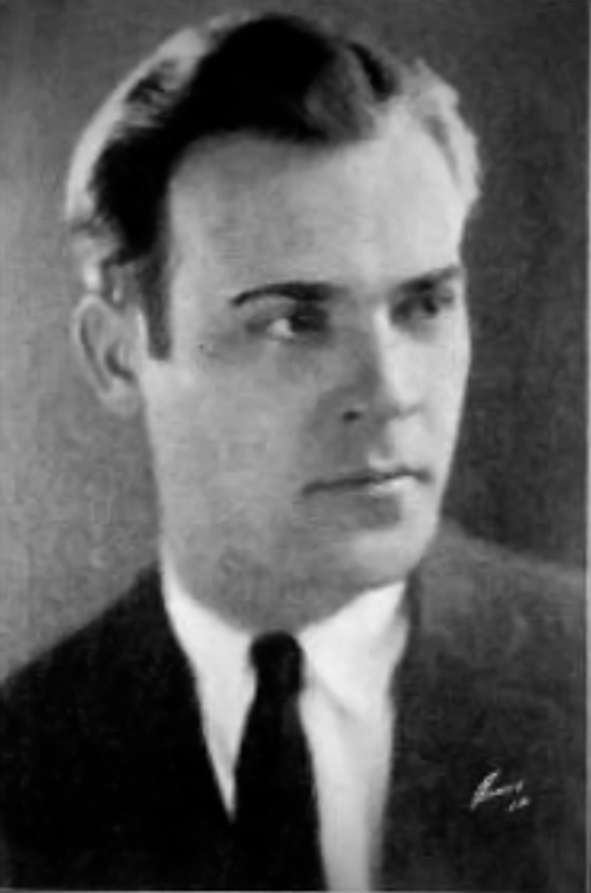
Johnnie Walker
Jackie Donovan Jr. (age 20)

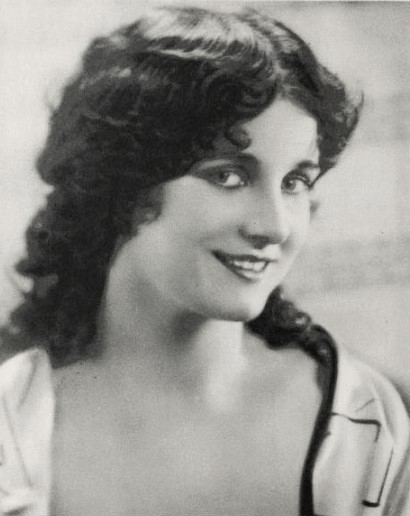
Gertrude Olmstead
Nora Malone

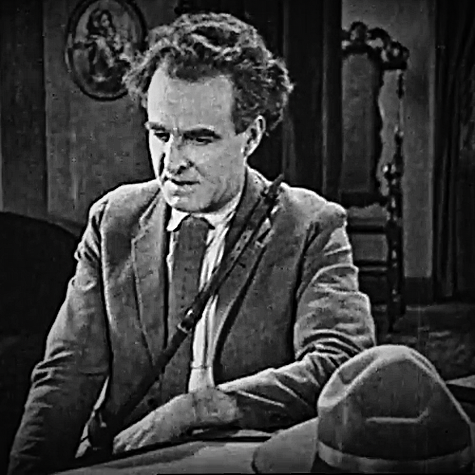
David Kirby
Mike Moran

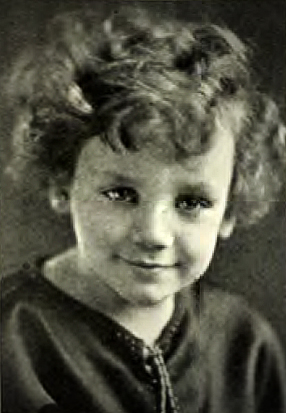
Dicky Brandon Age 4

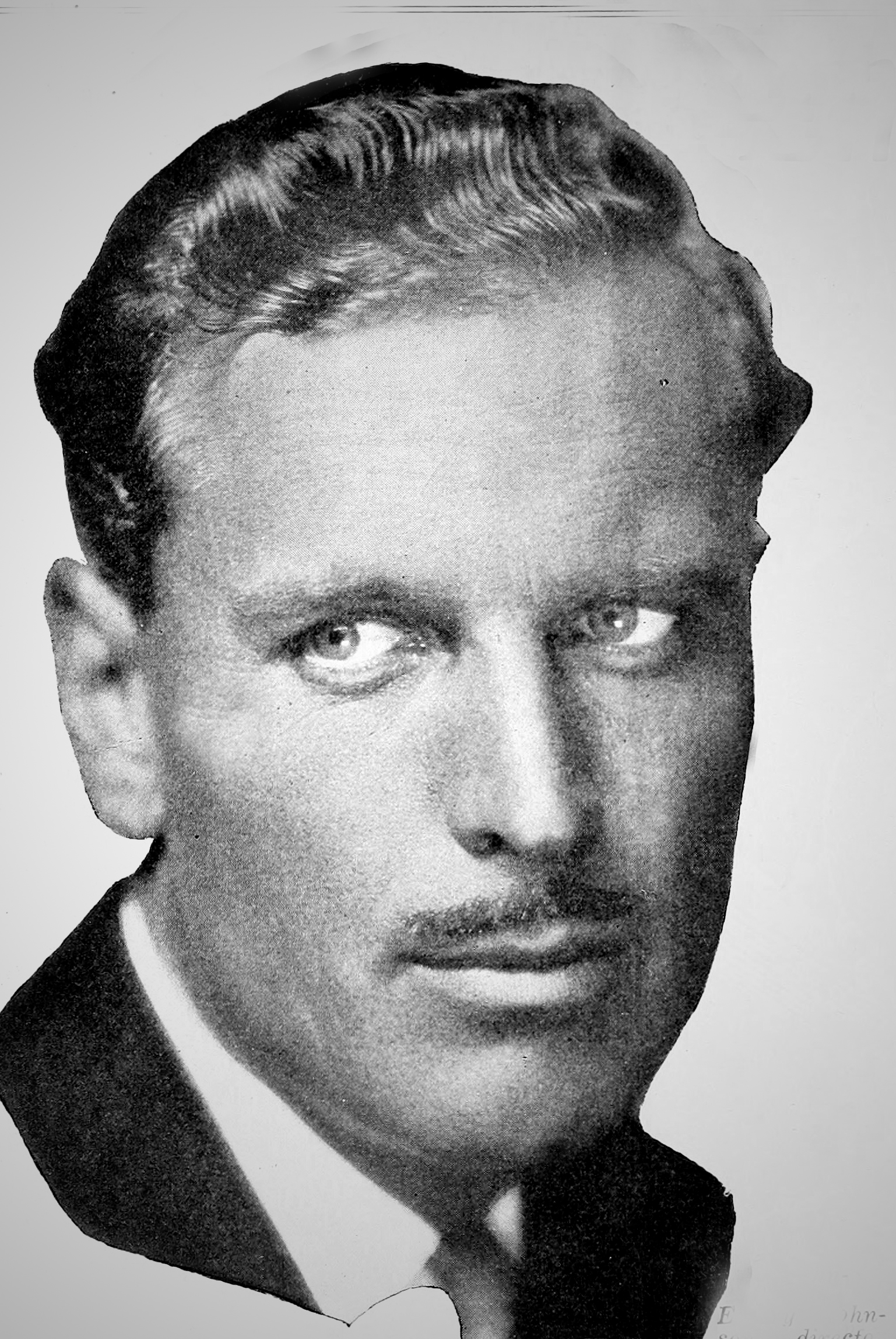
Emory Johnson
Director

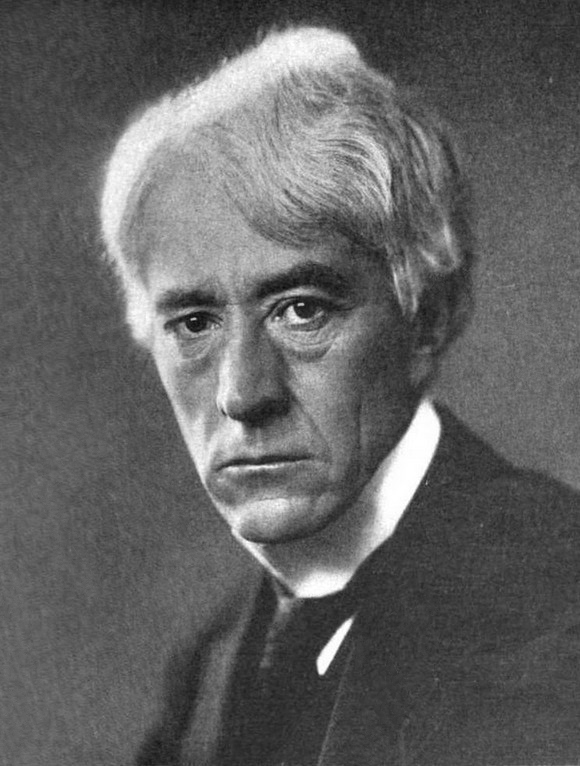
Kenesaw Mountain Landis
Commissioner of Baseball

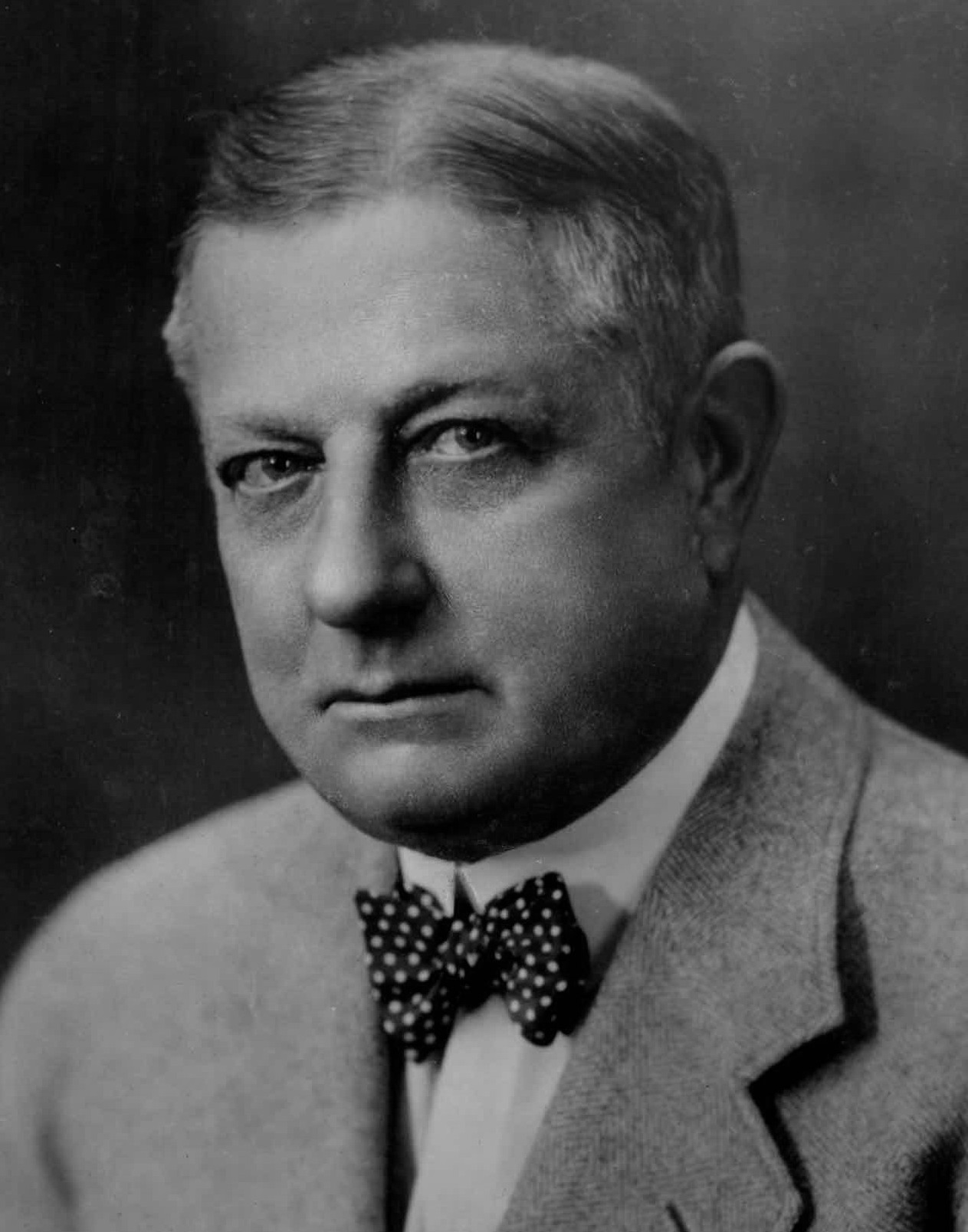
John Heydler
National League President
Movie Stills
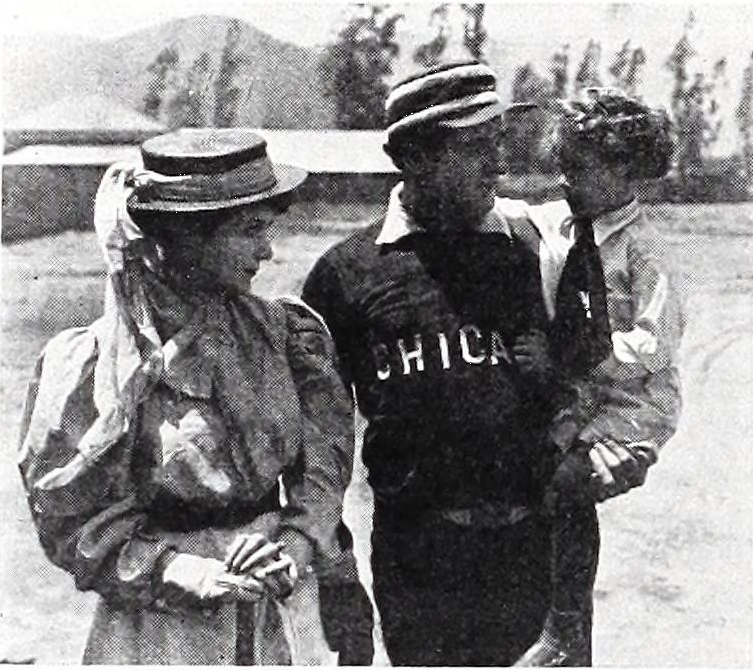
Jack and Mary with son

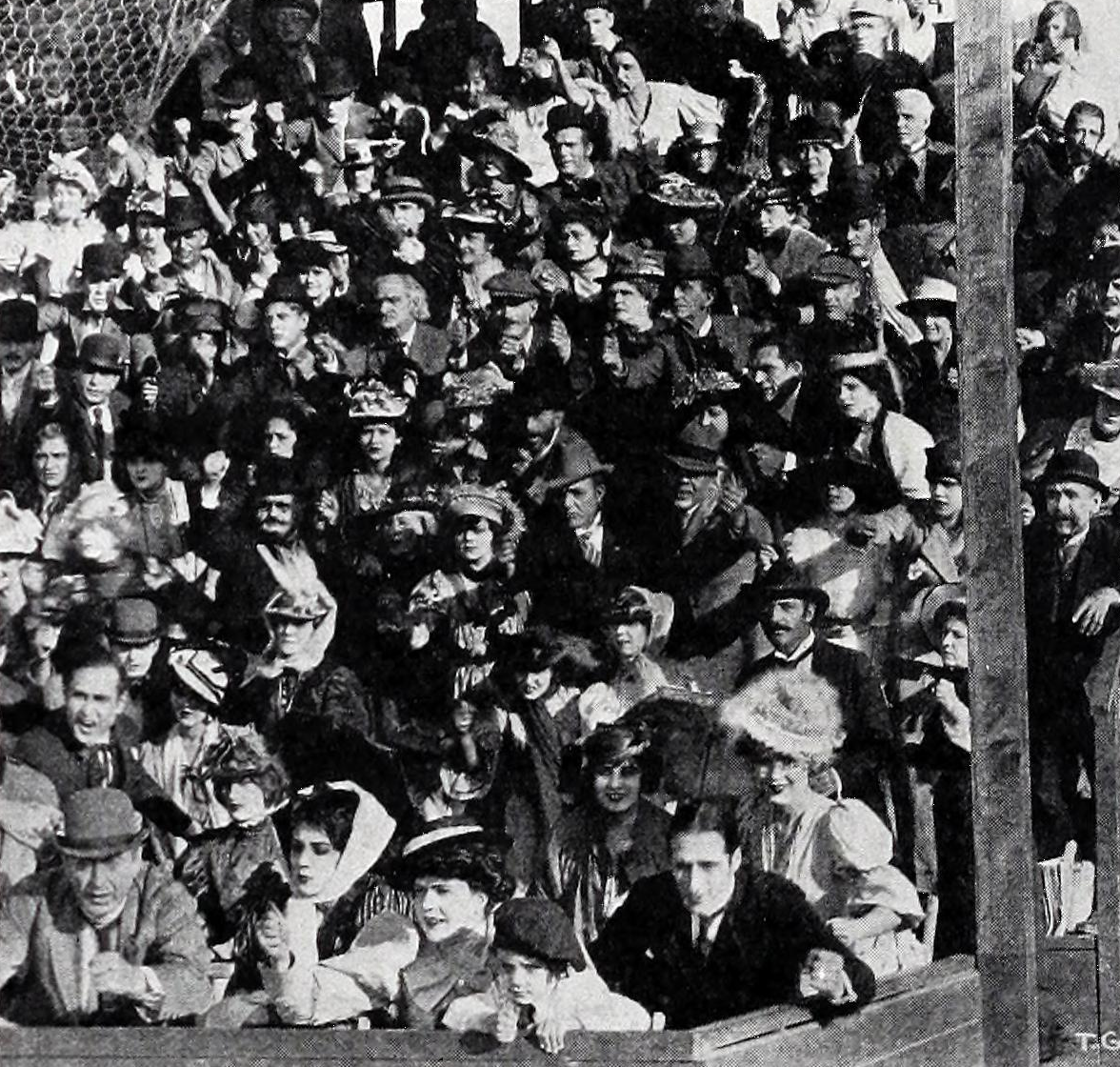
1906 Crowd in the stands

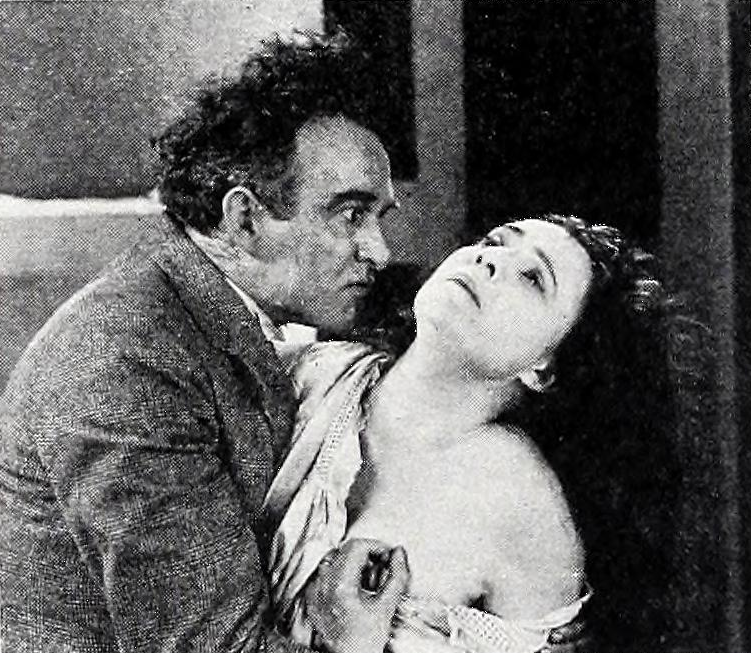
Mike Moran attacks Mary Donovan

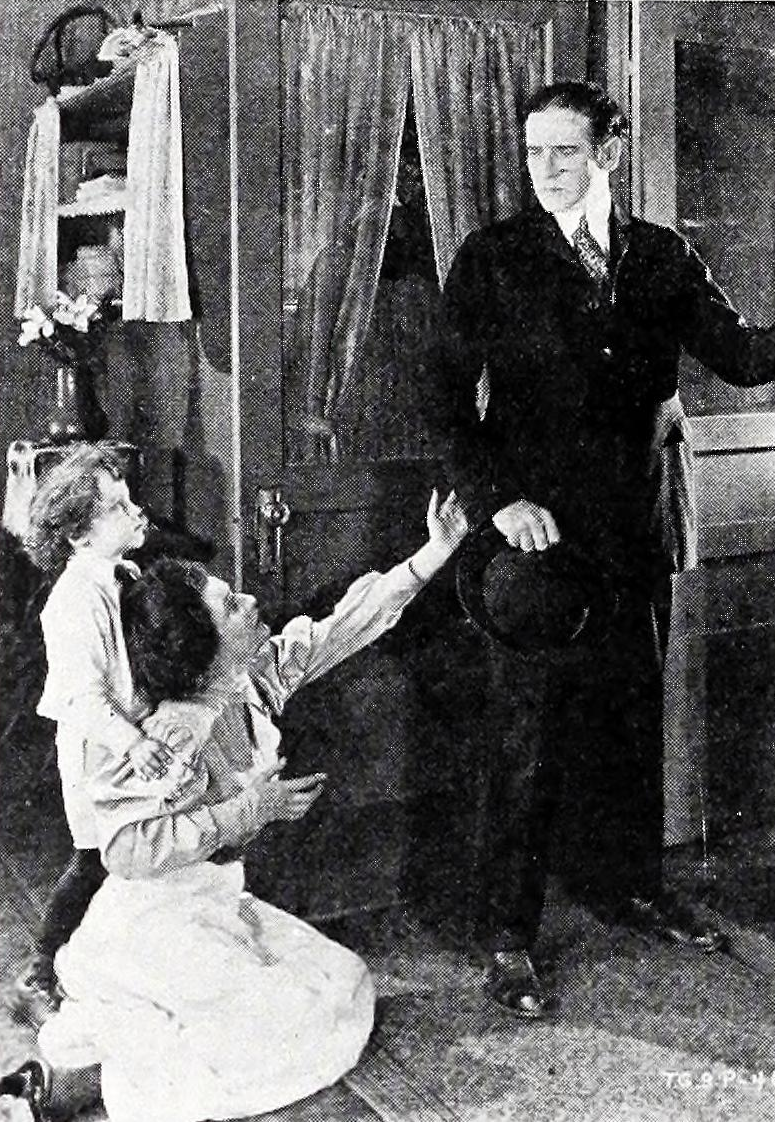
Mary Donovan Appeals to Mike Moran

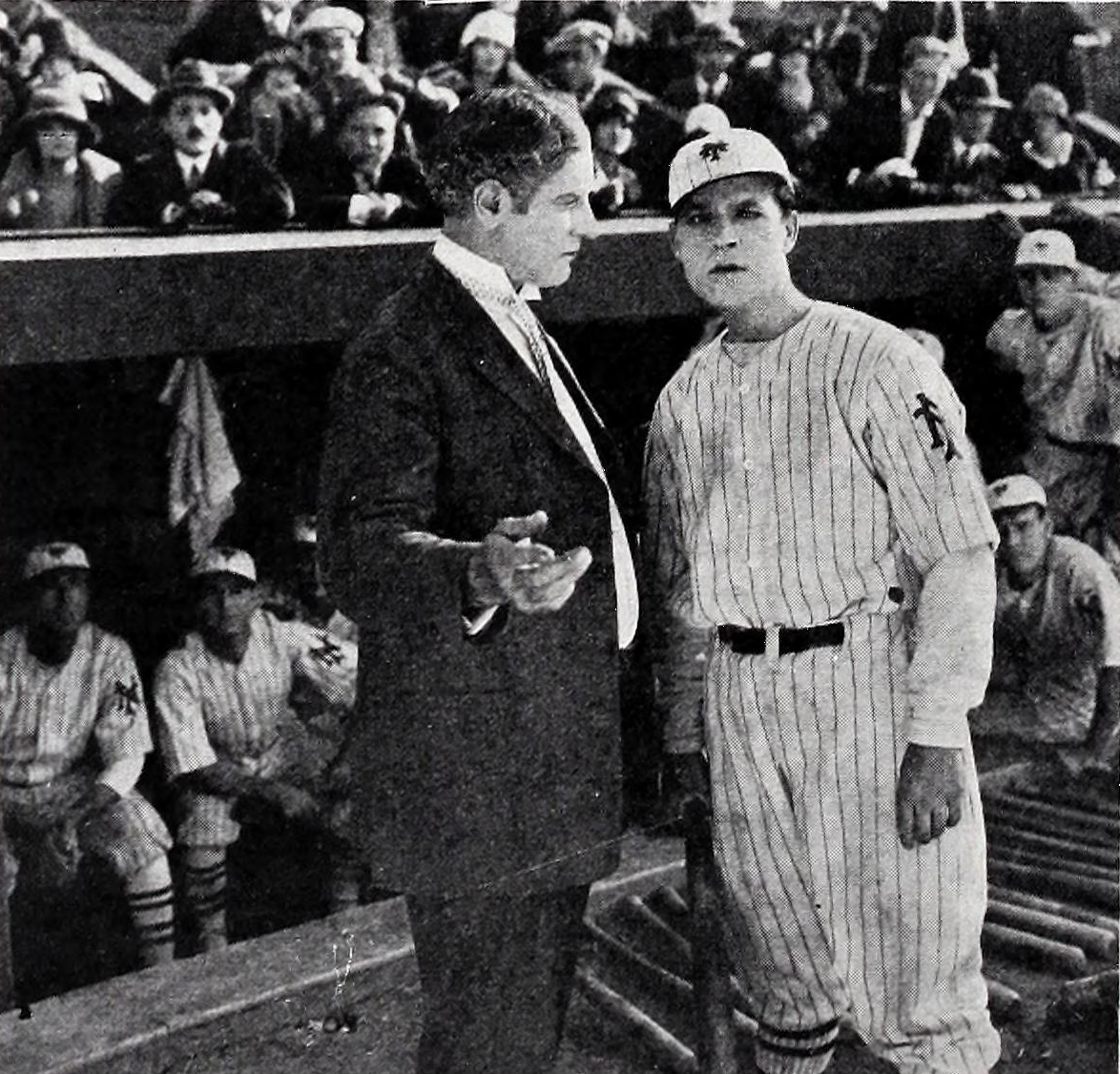
Jackie Jr And His Father

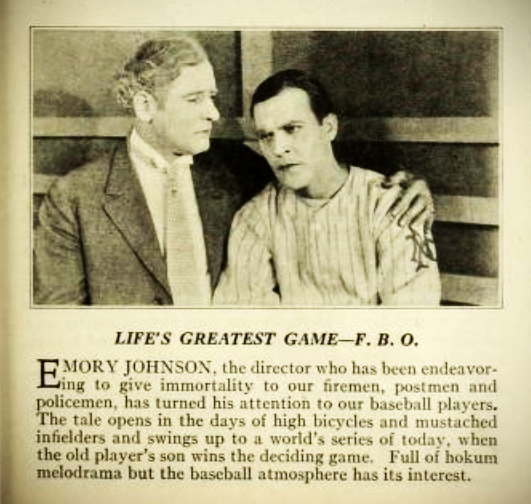
Jackie with his Father

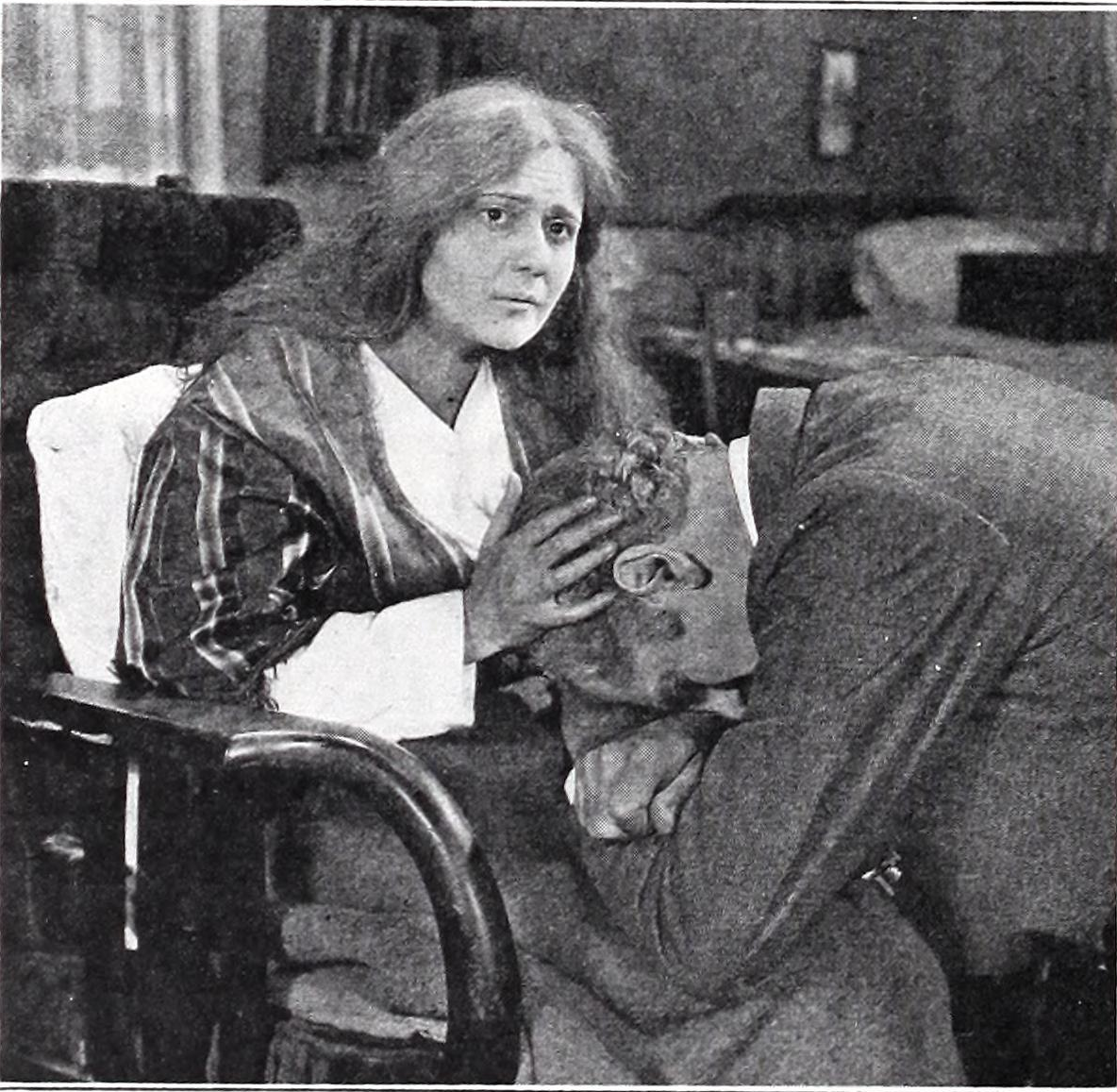
Mary Donovan reunited with Jack

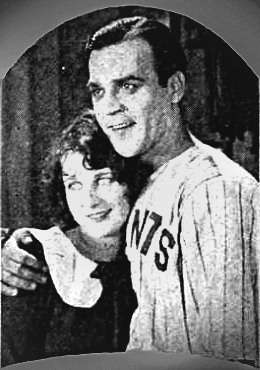
Johnnie Walker And Gertrude Olmstead

== See also ==
- List of baseball films

== Bibliography ==
- Goodwin, Doris Kearns (1991). The Fitzgeralds and the Kennedys: An American Saga. Manhattan, New York City: St. Martin's Press. p. 932. ISBN 978-0-312-06354-2. "Book Two: The Kennedys (1915-1940) - Chapter 20 This is a gold mine"
- Lasky, Betty (1984). RKO The Biggest Little Major of Them All. Englewood Cliffs, NJ: Prentice-Hall. p. 14. ISBN 0-13-781451-8.
- Kitchmer, George A. (2002). A Biographical Dictionary of Silent Film Western Actors and Actresses. Jefferson, North Carolina: McFarland & Company, Inc. ISBN 978-0-7864-4693-3.
- Voigt, D.Q. Baseball: An Illustrated History. Pennsylvania State University Press. ISBN 978-0-271-04096-7.
