= Hit of the Show =

1928 film by Ralph Ince

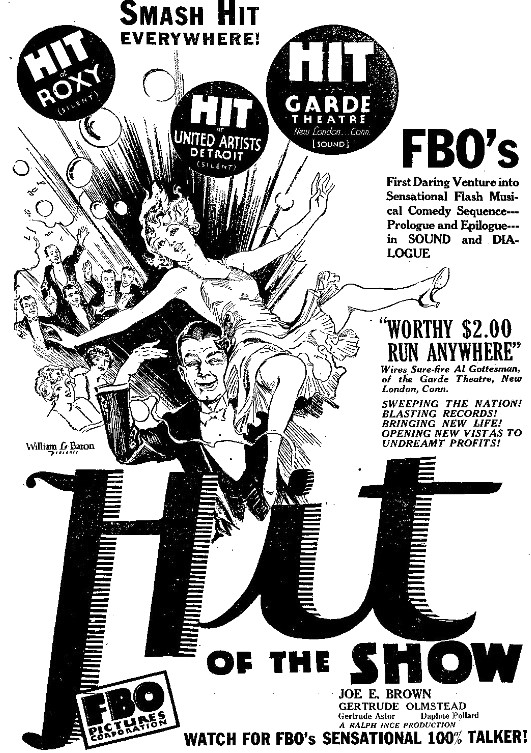
- Advertisement
- Directed by: Ralph Ince
- Written by: Enid Hibbard; Edgar Allan Woolf
- Starring: Joe E. Brown; Gertrude Olmstead; William Bailey
- Cinematography: Robert Martin
- Edited by: George M. Arthur
- Production company: Film Booking Offices of America
- Distributed by: Film Booking Offices of America
- Release date: July 8, 1928
- Running time: 72 minutes
- Country: United States
- Languages: Sound (Part-Talkie); English intertitles

Hit of the Show is a 1928 American sound part-talkie comedy film directed by Ralph Ince and starring Joe E. Brown, Gertrude Olmstead and William Bailey. In addition to sequences with audible dialogue or talking sequences, the film features a synchronized musical score and sound effects along with English intertitles. The soundtrack was recorded using the RCA Photophone sound-on-film system.

== Plot ==
For fifteen years, vaudeville comedian "Twisty" has struggled for his big break, holding onto nothing but faith—and a small ivory elephant charm he believes brings him luck. One day, he’s summoned to the office of big-time producer Greening, certain that his moment has finally come.

While waiting outside Greening’s door, Twisty meets a mysterious young woman in distress. Her name is Kathlyn Carson, and she has nowhere to go. Moved by her beauty and helplessness, Twisty forgets his own dreams and follows her, ultimately persuading his landlady to take her in on faith. His chivalry costs him the part, but Twisty doesn’t care—he’s fallen in love.

At a raucous boarding-house party, Twisty’s comic antics catch the eye of a visiting stage manager who offers him a role in a new Broadway-bound revue. Twisty, ever generous, gets Kathlyn a part too. It seems like fate is finally on his side.

But trouble brews backstage. Kathlyn draws the unwanted attention of the show’s leading man, Tremaine, a womanizing narcissist who sees Twisty only as a comic nuisance. Their rivalry deepens as Twisty struggles with a persistent pain in his chest, which he downplays, trusting in his charm to ward off misfortune.

On the eve of the show’s premiere, Twisty’s role is nearly cut to make room for a featured number showcasing Kathlyn’s talents. Hurt but undeterred, he encourages her. Backstage, a confrontation erupts—Twisty punches out Tremaine to protect Kathlyn. With the star unconscious, Twisty dons his costume and makeup to save the show. He goes onstage and delivers a stunning performance that wins over the audience—and finally earns his shot at stardom.

In the audience is Woody, Kathlyn’s former fiancé, a society man whose indiscretion at a bachelor party once drove her to flee. Moved by her performance and wracked with remorse, Woody seeks her forgiveness. She grants it.

But backstage, the effort has taken its toll on Twisty. His weakened heart gives out. He’s carried to the star’s dressing room, where the doctors agree he cannot be moved. Unaware of the truth, Twisty is told he was the toast of Broadway. Greening personally comes to offer him a long-dreamed-of contract. Surrounded by his closest friends and with Kathlyn nearby, Twisty beams with joy, believing both fame and love are finally his.

As he quietly passes away, still clinging to his beloved charm, it slips from his fingers and falls to the floor. In that moment, those gathered realize that Twisty—forever the comic underdog—was a man of extraordinary heart and courage.

Kathlyn, touched by Twisty’s love and sacrifice, turns to Woody, her heart changed. The curtain falls not only on Twisty’s life, but on the poignant story of a dreamer whose final act made him the true hit of the show.

== Cast ==
- Joe E. Brown as Twisty
- Gertrude Olmstead as Kathlyn Carson
- William Bailey as Tremaine
- Gertrude Astor as Trece
- Ole M. Ness as Goldstein
- Lee Shumway as Greening
- William Francis Dugan as Teague
- Ione Holmes as Charlotte Van
- LeRoy Mason as Woody
- Frank Mills as Barnes
- Daphne Pollard as The Slavey
- Cosmo Kyrle Bellew as Carson

== Music ==
The film featured a theme song entitled “You’re In Love and I’m In Love” which was composed by Walter Donaldson. Also featured on the soundtrack was a song entitled "Waitin' For Katy" which was composed by Gus Khan and Ted Shapiro.

== Preservation ==
A print of Hit of the Show is in the film collection of the Centre national du cinéma et de l'image animée at Fort de Bois-d'Arcy.

== See also ==
- List of early sound feature films (1926–1929)
