= Midnight Life (film) =

1928 film

- Directed by: Scott R. Dunlap
- Written by: Reginald Wright Kauffman (novel:The Spider's Web); Arthur F. Statter (adaptation); Adele Buffington (scenario); Delos Sutherland
- Produced by: Gotham; Sam Sax
- Starring: Francis X. Bushman; Gertrude Olmstead
- Cinematography: Ray June
- Edited by: Scott R. Dunlap; Ray Snyder
- Production company: Gotham Pictures
- Distributed by: Lumas Films
- Release date: August 28, 1928
- Running time: 5 reels
- Country: United States
- Language: Silent (English intertitles)

Midnight Life is a 1928 American silent mystery film produced by independent Gotham Company and distributed by B movie studio Lumas Films. The film is based on a novel, The Spider's Web, by Reginald Wright Kauffman. It was directed by Scott R. Dunlap and stars Francis X. Bushman and Gertrude Olmstead. This film is preserved at the Library of Congress.

== Cast ==
- Francis X. Bushman as Jim Logan
- Gertrude Olmstead as Betty Brown
- Edward Buzzell as Eddie Delaney
- Monte Carter as Steve Saros
- Cosmo Kyrle Bellew as Harlan Phillips
- Carlton S. King
