= Cobra (1925 film) =

1925 film

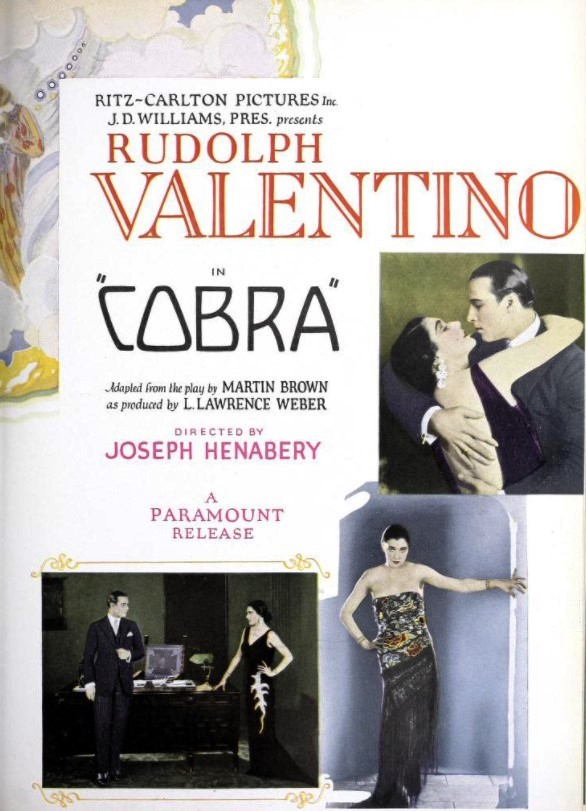
- Advertisement for the film
- Directed by: Joseph Henabery
- Written by: Anthony Coldeway
- Based on: Cobra by Martin Brown
- Produced by: Adolph Zukor; Jesse L. Lasky
- Starring: Rudolph Valentino; Nita Naldi; Casson Ferguson; Gertrude Olmstead
- Cinematography: Harry Fischbeck; Dev Jennings (J. Devereaux Jennings)
- Edited by: John H. Bonn
- Production company: Famous Players–Lasky / Ritz-Carlton Pictures
- Distributed by: Paramount Pictures
- Release date: November 30, 1925
- Running time: 70 minutes / 7 reels (6,895 feet)
- Country: United States
- Language: Silent (English intertitles)

Cobra is a 1925 American silent romantic drama film directed by Joseph Henabery and starring Rudolph Valentino. Produced by Famous Players–Lasky/Ritz-Carlton Pictures and distributed by Paramount Pictures, the film is based on the 1924 stage play Cobra by Martin Brown. Valentino portrays Count Rodrigo Torriani, an Italian aristocrat whose passion and impulsiveness entangle him in a scandalous love affair that ultimately leads to personal ruin. Released at the height of Valentino's fame, Cobra is noted for its sophisticated European setting and for showcasing the actor in one of his final romantic roles before his death in 1926.

== Plot ==
Cobra (1925)

Count Rodrigo Torriani is an Italian noble and a charming libertine. His weakness is women, who mesmerise and fascinate him – not unlike the myth that cobras mesmerise their prey.

Roridgo accepts an invitation from friend Jack Dorning to come to New York City to work as an antiques expert. While the job is rewarding, Rodrigo finds the temptation from the women surrounding him, including Dorning's secretary Mary Drake and wife Elise, challenging.

When Jack is away, Elise says to Rodrigo that she is in love with him. The two embrace and arrange to meet at a hotel. However, after meeting in a room, Rodrigo decides that he cannot betray his friend and leaves the hotel. It turns out to be a fortunate decision; the hotel burns to the ground in the middle of the night, killing Elise.

Rodrigo desperately wants a relationship with Mary. However, after Elise's death, he turns Mary's attentions toward Jack and decides to leave New York. The film ends with Rodrigo gazing out at the sea and the Statue of Liberty as he sets sail back to Europe.

== Cast ==
- Rudolph Valentino as Count Rodrigo Torriani
- Nita Naldi as Elsie Van Zile
- Casson Ferguson as Jack Dorning
- Gertrude Olmstead as Mary Drake
- Hector V. Sarno as Victor Minardi
- Claire De Lorez as Rosa Minardi
- Eileen Percy as Sophie Binner
- Lillian Langdon as Mrs. Porter Palmer
- Henry Barrows as the store manager
- Rosa Rosanova as Marie (uncredited)
- Natasha Rambova as A Dancer (uncredited)

== Production ==
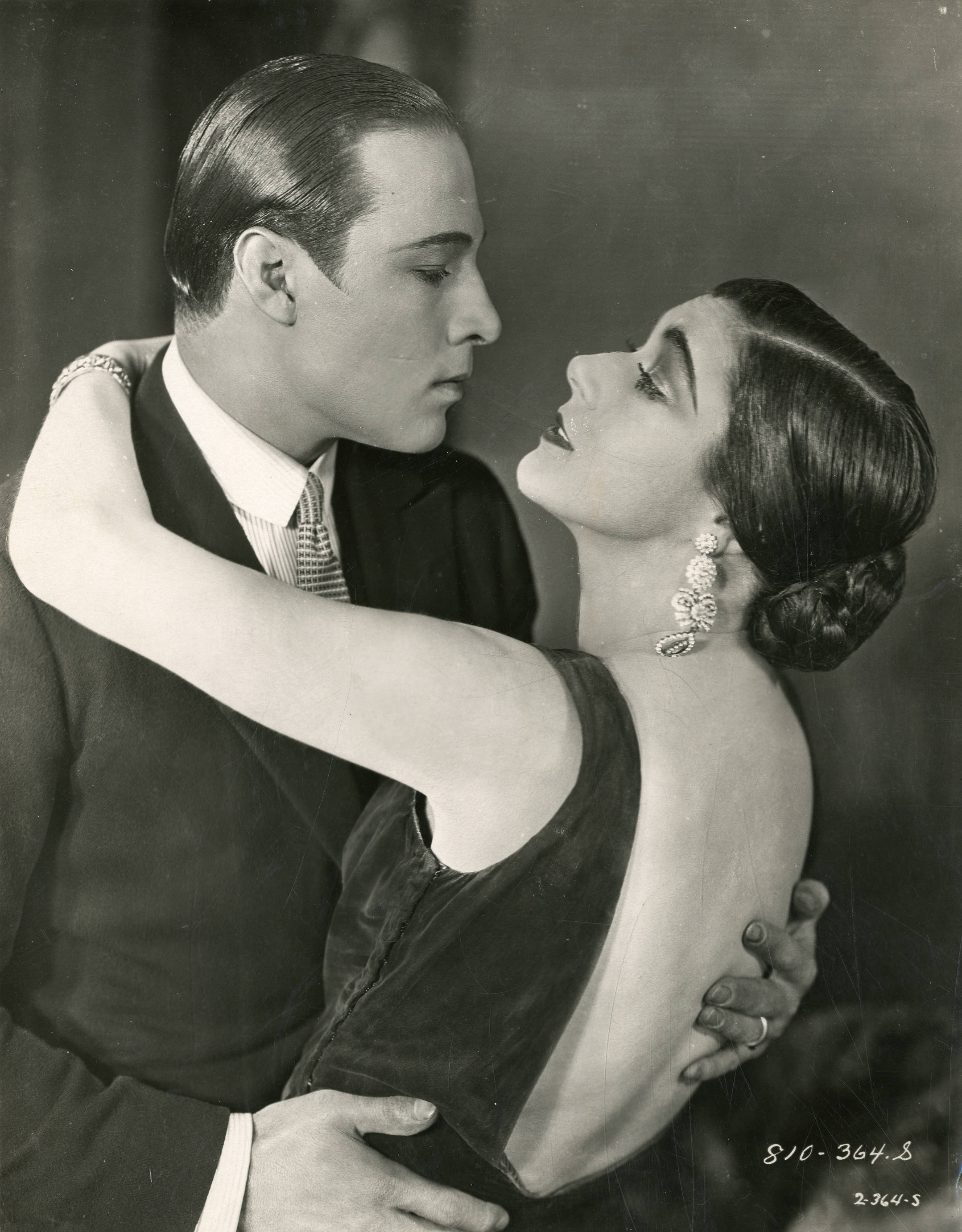
Film still of Valentino and Nita Naldi in Cobra

With his contract at Famous Players–Lasky fulfilled after the release of A Sainted Devil in 1924, Rudolph Valentino was released from the studio but remained contractually obligated to the Ritz-Carlton Pictures Corporation for four films. His next intended project was a personal passion project, The Hooded Falcon. Production on The Hooded Falcon quickly encountered difficulties, beginning with a screenplay by June Mathis. Dissatisfied with Mathis' draft, Valentino and his wife, Natacha Rambova, requested revisions, a move that deeply offended Mathis and led to a prolonged estrangement between her and Valentino.

While Rambova was occupied with costume designs and script revisions for The Hooded Falcon, Valentino was persuaded by J. D. Williams, head of Ritz-Carlton Pictures, to appear in Cobra opposite Nita Naldi in 1924. Valentino and Rambova agreed to the project on the condition that its release be delayed until after The Hooded Falcon premiered. After completing Cobra, the planned cast of The Hooded Falcon sailed for France for costume fittings; however, the project was ultimately abandoned. As a result, Cobra was released in late 1925, shortly after the debut of Valentino's comeback film The Eagle.

== Preservation ==
Cobra has survived and has been made available to the public on both VHS and DVD by independent film dealers and major movie distributors.
