= Jane Thomas (actress) =

American actress (1899–1976)

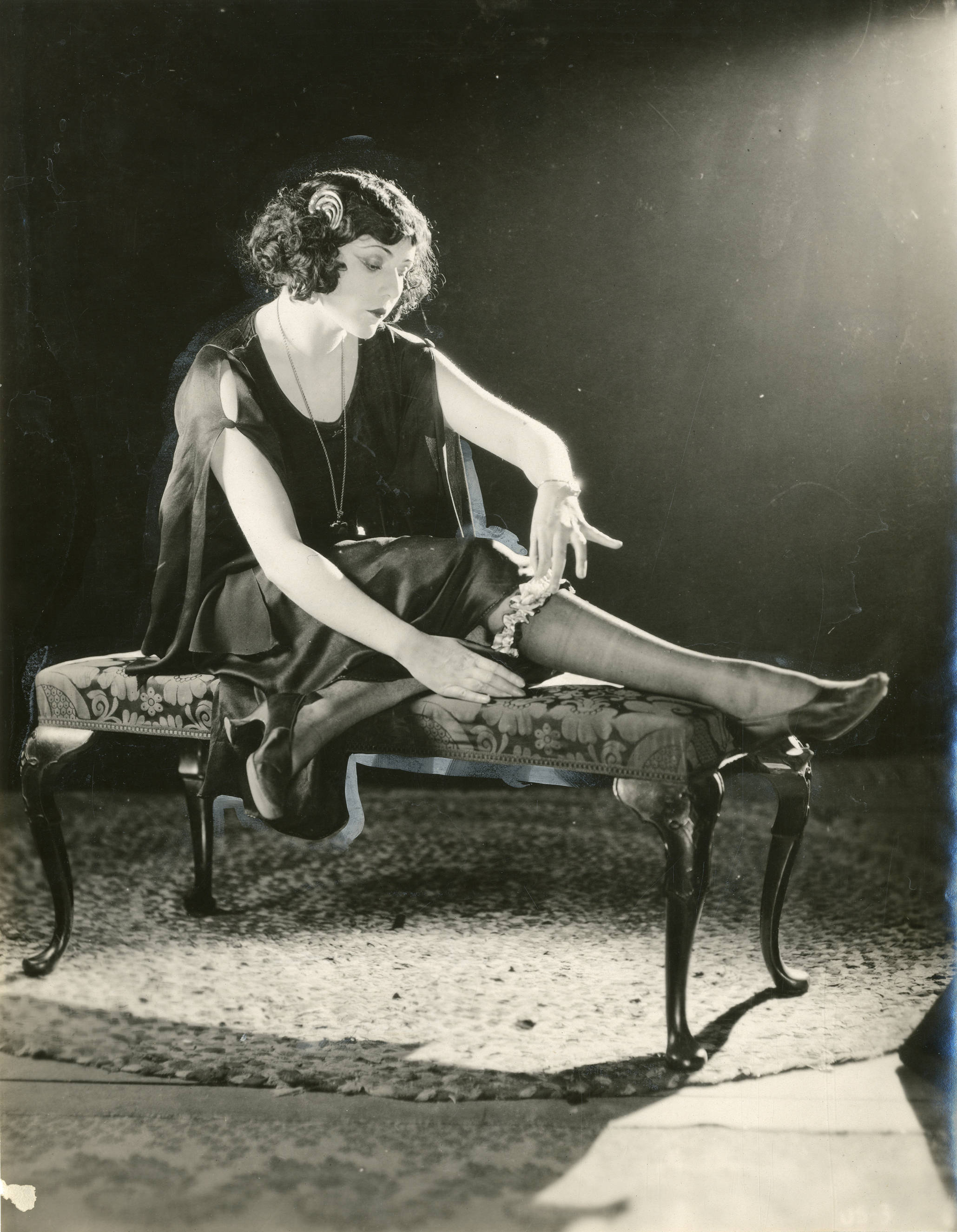
- Born: May 31, 1899; Chicago, Illinois, United States
- Died: October 26, 1976 (aged 77); Los Angeles, California, United States
- Occupation: Actress
- Years active: 1916–1926 (film)

Jane Thomas (1899–1976) was an American film actress of the silent era. She starred in a number of independent films during the early 1920s, including Heedless Moths where she doubled for the model Audrey Munson in the acting scenes.

== Selected filmography ==
- S.O.S. (1917)
- The North Wind's Malice (1920)
- Reckless Wives (1921)
- Heedless Moths (1921)
- Silver Wings (1922)
- Queen of the Moulin Rouge (1922)
- The Secrets of Paris (1922)
- How Women Love (1922)
- The Town That Forgot God (1922)
- Breaking Home Ties (1922)
- The Exciters (1923)
- Lost in a Big City (1923)
- The White Rose (1923)
- Life's Greatest Game (1924)
- Blue Water (1924)
- Floodgates (1924)
- The Hoosier Schoolmaster (1924)
- Getting 'Em Right (1925)
- The Adorable Deceiver (1926)
- In Search of a Hero (1926)
- The Law of the Snow Country (1926)
- The Big Show (1926)
- The Hidden Way (1926)
- The Roaring Road (1926)

== Bibliography ==
- Katchmer, George A. A Biographical Dictionary of Silent Film Western Actors and Actresses. McFarland, 2015.
