= The Town That Forgot God =

1922 American drama film by Harry F. Millarde

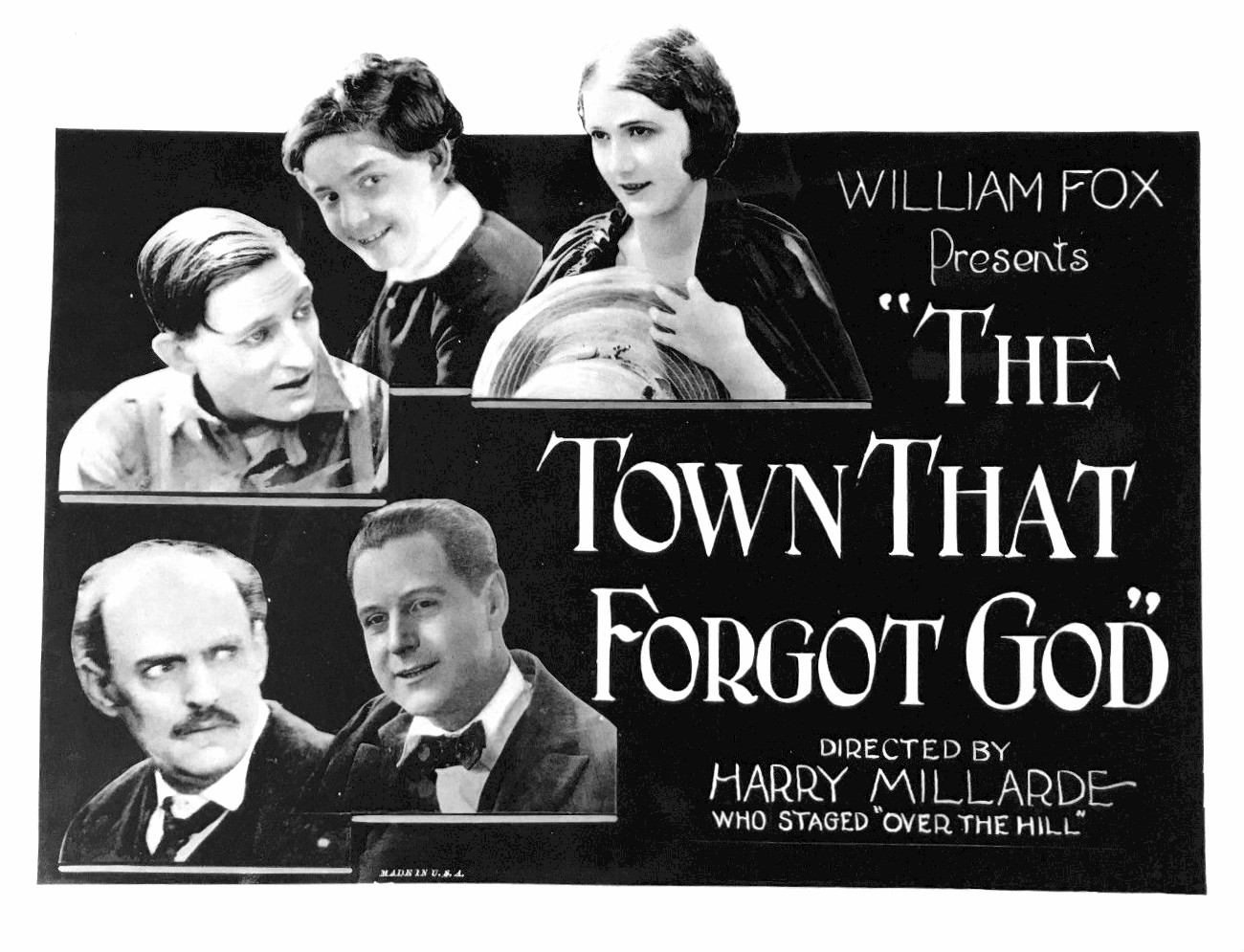
- Lobby card
- Directed by: Harry F. Millarde
- Screenplay by: Paul Sloane
- Starring: Ben Grauer; Warren William; Jane Thomas; Harry Benham; Edwin Denison; Grace Barton
- Cinematography: Joseph Ruttenberg; Al Wilson
- Edited by: Hettie Gray Baker
- Production company: Fox Film Corporation
- Distributed by: Fox Film Corporation
- Release dates: October 30, 1922 (New York); February 11, 1923 (United States)
- Running time: 90 minutes
- Country: United States
- Language: English

The Town That Forgot God is a 1922 American drama film directed by Harry F. Millarde and written by Paul Sloane. The film stars Ben Grauer, Warren William, Jane Thomas, Harry Benham, Edwin Denison and Grace Barton. The film was released on February 11, 1923, by Fox Film Corporation.

== Cast ==
- Ben Grauer as David
- Warren William as Eben
- Jane Thomas as Betty Gibbs
- Harry Benham as Harry Adams
- Edwin Denison as The Squire
- Grace Barton as His Wife
- Raymond Bloomer as David
- Nina Cassavant as David's Wife

== Preservation ==
With no prints of The Town That Forgot God located in any film archives, it is considered a lost film. In February 2021, the film was cited by the National Film Preservation Board on their Lost U.S. Silent Feature Films.
