= Dr. Jekyll and Mr. Hyde (1931 film) =

1931 film by Rouben Mamoulian

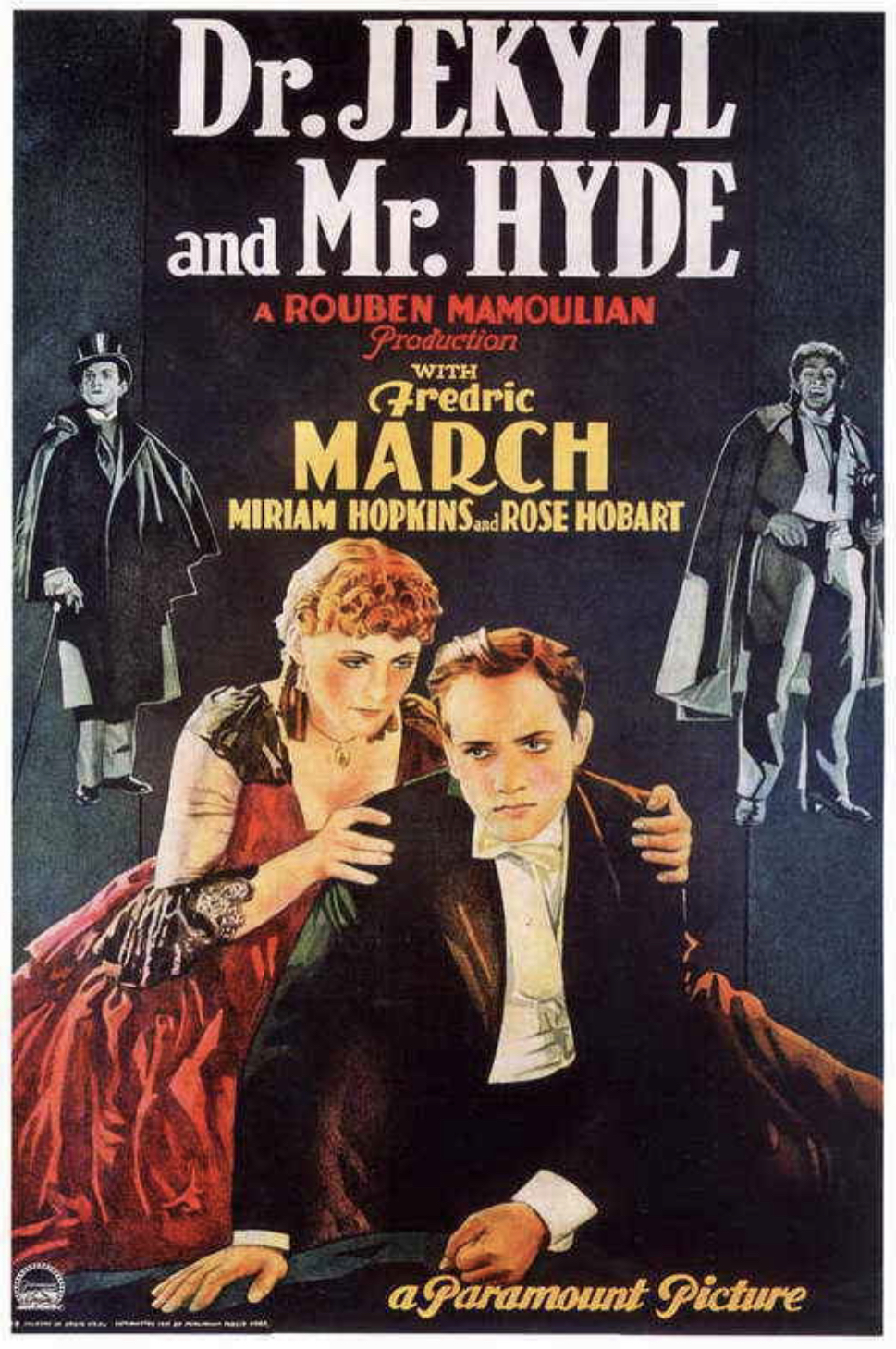
- Theatrical release poster
- Directed by: Rouben Mamoulian
- Screenplay by: Samuel Hoffenstein; Percy Heath
- Based on: The Strange Case of Dr. Jekyll and Mr. Hyde; 1886 novella by Robert Louis Stevenson
- Produced by: Rouben Mamoulian
- Starring: Fredric March; Miriam Hopkins; Rose Hobart
- Cinematography: Karl Struss
- Edited by: William Shea
- Music by: Johann Sebastian Bach (uncredited); Herman Hand (adaptor – uncredited)
- Production company: Paramount Pictures
- Distributed by: Paramount Pictures
- Release dates: December 24, 1931 (Los Angeles); December 31, 1931 (New York City); January 3, 1932 (United States)
- Running time: 96 minutes
- Country: United States
- Language: English
- Budget: $535,000
- Box office: $1.25 million (U.S. and Canada rentals)

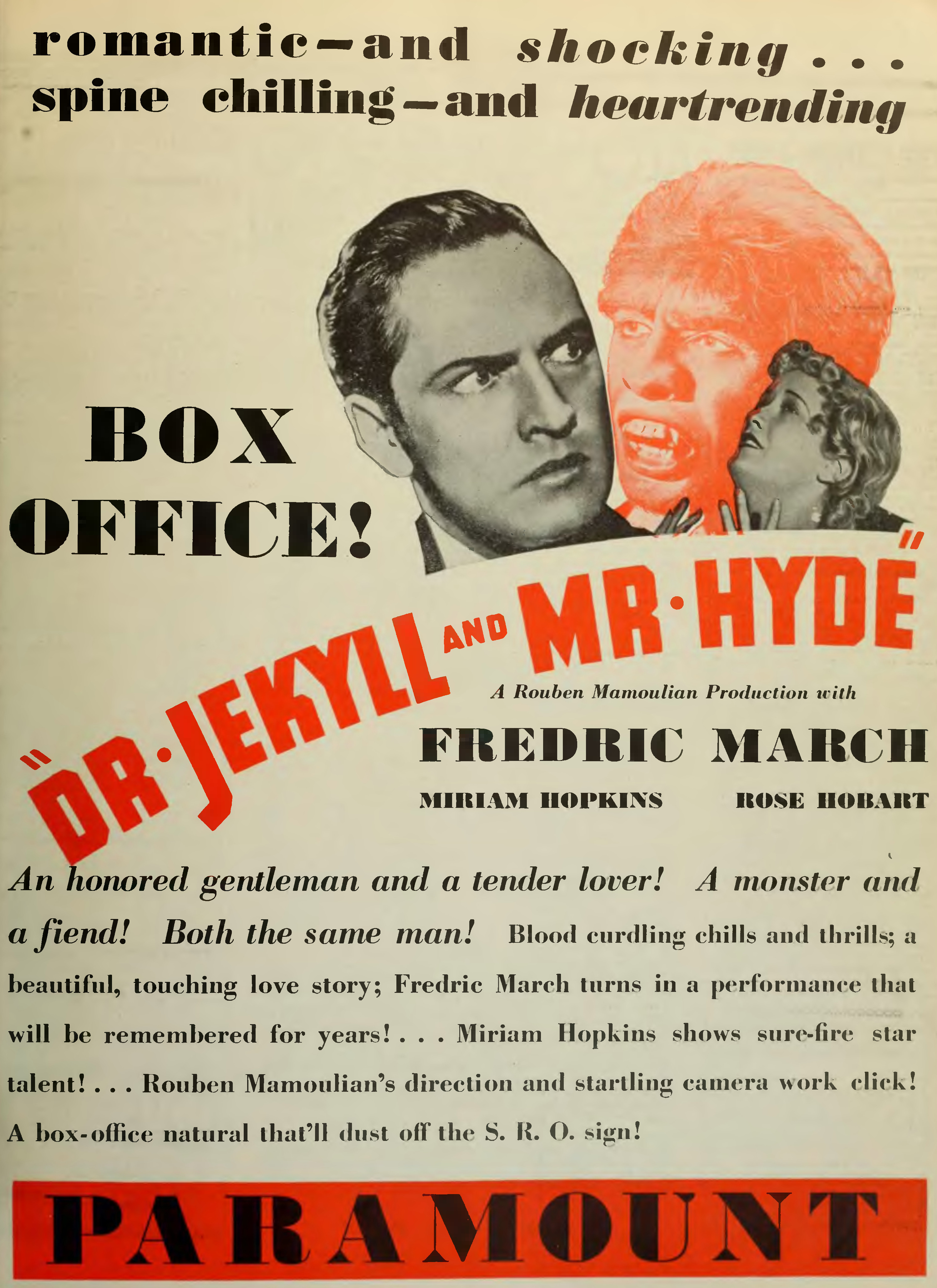
Dr. Jekyll and Mr Hyde ad in The Film Daily, 1932

Dr. Jekyll and Mr. Hyde is a 1931 American pre-Code horror film, directed by Rouben Mamoulian and starring Fredric March, who plays a possessed doctor who tests his new formula that can unleash people's inner demons. The film is an adaptation of Strange Case of Dr. Jekyll and Mr. Hyde, the 1886 Robert Louis Stevenson tale of a man who takes a potion which turns him from a mild-mannered man of science into a homicidal maniac. The film was a critical and commercial success upon its release. Nominated for three Academy Awards, March won the award for Best Actor, sharing the award with Wallace Beery for The Champ.

As a film published in 1931, Dr. Jekyll and Mr. Hyde will enter the American public domain on January 1, 2027.

== Plot ==
Dr. Henry Jekyll, a kind English doctor in Victorian London, is certain that within each man lurks impulses for both good and evil. He is desperately in love with his fiancée Muriel Carew and wants to marry her immediately. But her father, Brigadier General Sir Danvers Carew, orders them to wait. One night, while walking home with his colleague, Dr. John Lanyon, Jekyll spots a bar singer, Ivy Pierson, being attacked by a man outside her boarding house. Jekyll drives the man away and carries Ivy up to her room to attend to her. Ivy tries to seduce Jekyll but, though he is tempted, he leaves with Lanyon.

When Sir Danvers takes Muriel to Bath, Jekyll begins to experiment with drugs that he believes will unleash his evil side. After imbibing a concoction of these drugs, he transforms into Edward Hyde—a hideous, impulsive, sadistic, violent, amoral man who indulges his every desire. Hyde finds Ivy in the music hall where she works. He offers to financially support her in return for her company. Ivy is unwilling but Hyde forces her to. They stay at her boarding house where Hyde repeatedly rapes her, beats her and psychologically manipulates her. When Hyde reads in the paper that Sir Danvers and Muriel are planning to return to London, Hyde leaves Ivy but threatens her that he'll return when she least expects it.

Overcome with guilt, Jekyll sends £50 to Ivy. On the advice of her landlady, Ivy goes to see Dr. Jekyll and recognizes him as the man who saved her from abuse that night. She tearfully tells him about her situation with Hyde, and Jekyll reassures her that she will never see Hyde again. But the next night, while walking to a party at Muriel's where the wedding date is to be announced, Jekyll again changes into Hyde upon seeing a cat stalk and kill a bird. Rather than attend the party, Hyde goes to Ivy's room and murders her.

Hyde returns to Jekyll's house but is refused admission by the butler. Desperate, Hyde writes a letter to Lanyon instructing him to take certain chemicals from Jekyll's laboratory and take them home. When Hyde arrives, Lanyon pulls a gun on him and demands that Hyde take him to Jekyll. With no other choice, Hyde drinks the formula and changes back into Jekyll before a shocked Lanyon.

Aware that he cannot control the transformations, Jekyll goes to the Carew home and breaks off the engagement. After he leaves, he stands on the terrace and watches Muriel cry. This triggers another transformation and, as Hyde, he enters the house and assaults Muriel. Sir Danvers tries to stop him, but Hyde beats him to death with Jekyll's walking stick and flees back to Jekyll's laboratory, where he takes the formula again and reverts to Jekyll.

Lanyon recognizes the broken cane left at the crime scene and takes the police to Jekyll's home. Jekyll tells them that Hyde has already left, Lanyon insists that Jekyll and Hyde are one and the same. The stress causes another transformation into an enraged Hyde and, after a fierce struggle, Hyde is shot by the police. Dying, he transforms back into Jekyll.

== Cast ==
- Fredric March as Dr. Henry Jekyll / Mr. Edward Hyde
- Miriam Hopkins as Ivy Pierson
- Rose Hobart as Muriel Carew
- Holmes Herbert as Dr. John Lanyon
- Halliwell Hobbes as Brigadier-General Danvers Carew
- Edgar Norton as Poole
- Tempe Pigott as Mrs. Hawkins
- Arnold Lucy as Utterson (uncredited)
- Colonel McDonnell as Hobson (uncredited)

== Production ==
The film was made before the full enforcement of the Production Code, and it is remembered today for its strong sexual content, embodied mostly in the character of the bar singer Ivy Pierson, played by Miriam Hopkins. When it was re-released in 1936, the Code required 8 minutes to be removed before the film could be distributed to theaters. This footage was restored for the VHS and DVD releases.

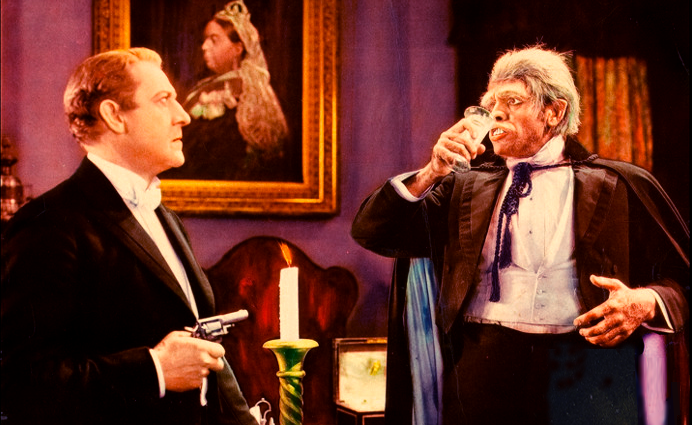
Wally Westmore's make-up transformed Fredric March's Doctor Jekyll into the grotesquely simian Mr Hyde.

The secret of the transformation scenes was not revealed for decades, when Mamoulian revealed it in The Celluloid Muse (1969), a volume of interviews with Hollywood directors. Make-up was applied in contrasting colors. A series of colored filters that matched the make-up was then used which enabled the make-up to be exposed gradually or made invisible. The change in color was not visible on the black-and-white film.

Wally Westmore's make-up for Hyde — simian and hairy with large canine teeth — greatly influenced the popular image of Hyde in media and comic books. In part, this look reflected the novella's implication of Hyde as embodying repressed evil, and hence being semi-evolved or simian in appearance. The characters of Muriel Carew and Ivy Pierson do not appear in Stevenson's original story; Ivy Pierson's character is original to the film, and Muriel [Agnes] Carew appears in the 1887 stage version by playwright Thomas Russell Sullivan.

John Barrymore was asked by Paramount to play the lead role in an attempt to recreate his role from the 1920 version of Jekyll and Hyde, but he was already under a new contract with Metro-Goldwyn-Mayer. Paramount suggested Irving Pichel for the role, but the director felt that while he would deliver a fine performance, he was not handsome enough and suggested March. Paramount then gave the part to March, who was under contract and who bore a physical resemblance to Barrymore. March had played a John Barrymore-like character in the Paramount film The Royal Family of Broadway (1930), a story about an acting family similar to the Barrymores. March, following stage tradition, overplayed both Jekyll and Hyde to emphasize their contrasts, and he won the Academy Award for Best Actor for his performance of the role.

When Metro-Goldwyn-Mayer remade the film 10 years later with Spencer Tracy in the lead, the studio bought the negative and the rights to both the Mamoulian version and the earlier 1920 silent version, paying $125,000. Every print of the 1931 film that could be located was recalled and destroyed, and for decades, the film was believed lost. The Tracy version was much less well received, and March jokingly sent Tracy a telegram thanking him for the greatest boost to his reputation of his entire career.

The opening credits music is Toccata and Fugue in D minor, BWV 565 by Johann Sebastian Bach.

== Reception ==
=== Box office ===
Dr. Jekyll and Mr. Hyde premiered in Los Angeles on December 24, 1931, and opened in New York City on December 31, 1931. Grossing $1.25 million in domestic rentals, the film was a box office hit on par with the Universal monster films of the era, even considering that its $535,000 budget was high for a horror film at the time.

=== Critical reception ===
Dr. Jekyll and Mr. Hyde received mostly positive reviews upon its release. Mordaunt Hall of The New York Times wrote an enthusiastic review, comparing it favorably to the John Barrymore version as a "far more tense and shuddering affair" than that film. Hall called March "the stellar performer" in the title role while praising the acting of the entire supporting cast as well, and called the old-fashioned atmosphere created by the costumes and set designs "quite pleasing".

Variety ran a somewhat less favorable but still positive review. Alfred Rushford Greason wrote that "the picture doesn't build to an effective climax" because it was too slow and labored in getting there, and that while the initial transformation sequence "carries a terrific punch", its effect became lessened with successive uses. However, Greason credited March with "an outstanding bit of theatrical acting", declared the makeup "a triumph", and said that the sets and lighting alone made the film worth seeing "as models of atmospheric surroundings."

John Mosher of The New Yorker reported that the film "has its full storage of horror" and was "well acted". March, he wrote, "gives us a Mr. Hyde as athletic and exuberant as might have been that of Douglas Fairbanks, Senior." Film Daily declared: "Gripping performance by Fredric March is highlight of strong drama, ace supporting cast and direction".

More recently, film critic Leonard Maltin gave the film 3 out of a possible 4 stars, calling it "exciting", and "floridly cinematic", also praising March's and Hopkins performances.

Film review aggregator Rotten Tomatoes reported an approval rating of 91%, based on 44 reviews, with a rating average of 8.3/10. The site's critical consensus reads, "A classic. The definitive version of the Robert Louis Stevenson novella from 1931, with innovative special effects, atmospheric cinematography and deranged overacting."

== Awards and honors ==
Wins

- Academy Awards: Oscar; Best Actor in a Leading Role, Fredric March; tied with Wallace Beery for The Champ; 1932.
- Venice Film Festival: Audience Referendum; Most Favorite Actor, Fredric March; Most Original Fantasy Story, Rouben Mamoulian; 1932.
- Film Daily: 10 Best Films
- The New York Times: 10 Best Films

Nominations

- Academy Awards: Oscar; Best Adaptation Writing, Percy Heath and Samuel Hoffenstein; 1932; Best Cinematography, Karl Struss.

Other honors

The film is recognized by American Film Institute in these lists:

- 2001: AFI's 100 Years...100 Thrills – Nominated
- 2003: AFI's 100 Years...100 Heroes & Villains:
  - Mr. Hyde – Nominated Villain

== Home media ==
Dr. Jekyll and Mr. Hyde was released on DVD on May 27, 2018 and Blu-ray on October 25, 2022.

== Remake ==
Dr. Jekyll and Mr. Hyde (1941) starring Spencer Tracy is a remake of this film.

== See also ==
- Gothic film
- The House That Shadows Built (1931 promotional film by Paramount)
