= Dr. Jekyll and Mr. Hyde (1888 play) =

Play by John McKinney

- Written by: John McKinney
- Based on: Strange Case of Dr Jekyll and Mr Hyde by Robert Louis Stevenson
- Characters: Henry Jekyll/Edward Hyde
- Original language: English
- Genre: Horror; Melodrama; Science fiction
- Setting: London

Premiere
- Date premiered: March 12, 1888
- Place premiered: Niblo's Garden

Dr. Jekyll and Mr. Hyde is a four-act play written by John McKinney in collaboration with the actor Daniel E. Bandmann. It is an adaptation of Strange Case of Dr Jekyll and Mr Hyde, an 1886 novella written by the Scottish author Robert Louis Stevenson. The story focuses on Henry Jekyll, a respected London doctor, and his involvement with Edward Hyde, a loathsome criminal. After Hyde murders a vicar, Jekyll's friends suspect he is helping the killer, but the truth is that Jekyll and Hyde are the same person. Jekyll has developed a potion that allows him to transform himself into Hyde and back again. When he runs out of the potion, he is trapped in his Hyde form and commits suicide before he can be arrested.

The play debuted on Broadway in March 1888. The adaptation was not authorized by Stevenson, but copyright law in the United States allowed Bandmann to produce the adaptation without permission. In August, Bandmann took the play to London, where it was in direct competition with an authorized adaptation, also using the title Dr. Jekyll and Mr. Hyde, written by Thomas Russell Sullivan and starring Richard Mansfield. Both plays opened in London in August 1888, but Bandmann's production was quickly closed due to legal action by Stevenson's publisher.

== Plot ==
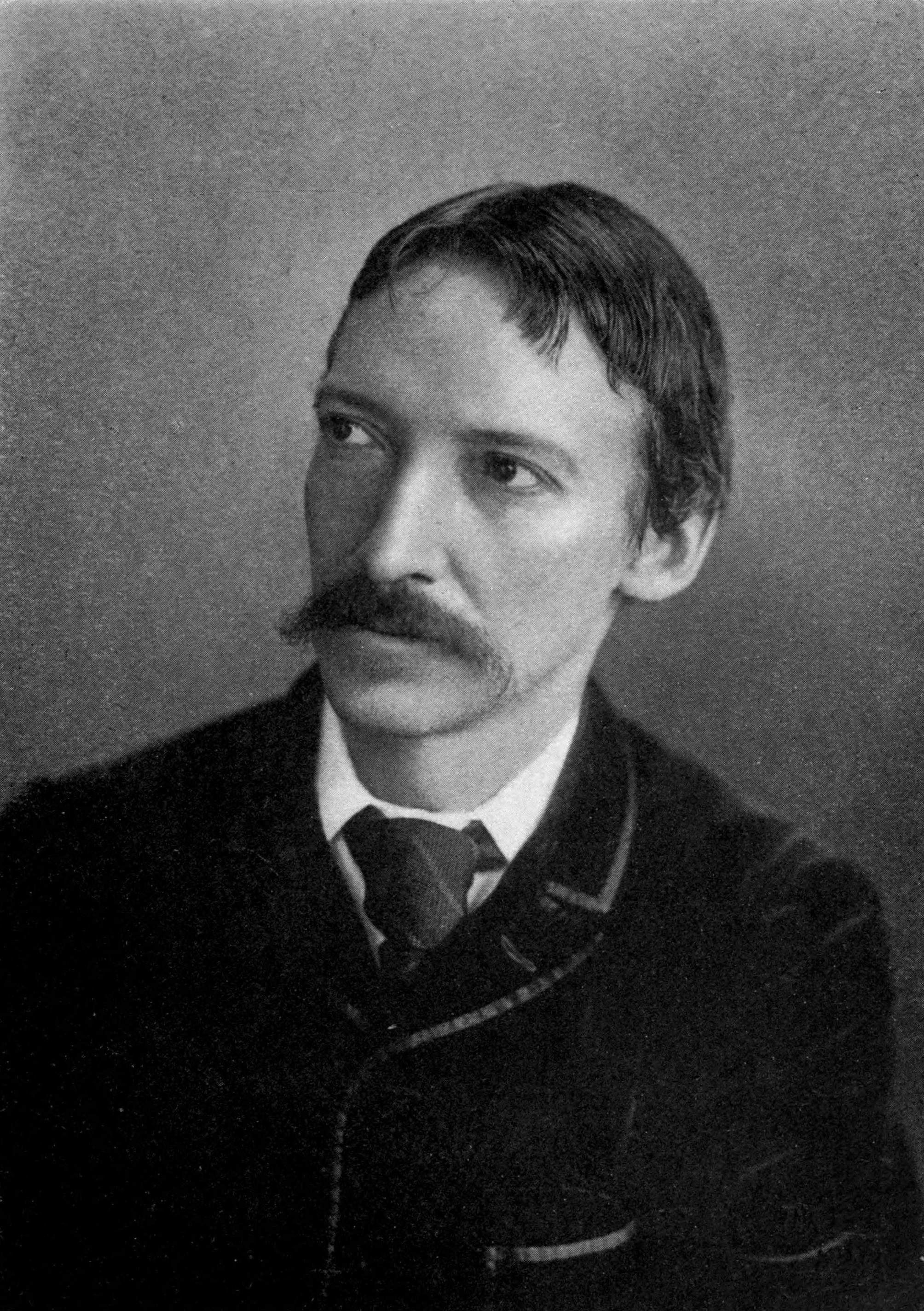
The story was adapted from a novella by Robert Louis Stevenson.

In the first act, attorney J. G. Utterson is at a London vicarage, talking to the vicar, Reverend William Howell. Howell relates a story about how he intervened when he saw a boy being beaten by a man named Edward Hyde. Utterson is dismayed to hear the name Edward Hyde. After the vicar leaves, Utterson speaks with Dr. Lanyon, then with Dr. Henry Jekyll, who lives next door to the vicarage. After Jekyll and Utterson leave, Lanyon speaks to the vicar's daughter, Sybil Howell, who admits to being in love with Jekyll. Sybil sees that Lanyon does not approve, and she asks Jekyll about it when he returns. He says she would not understand, and begins talking about the dual presence of good and evil in men. Suddenly, Jekyll feels that a "change is approaching", and runs into the shadows. Edward Hyde emerges from the shadows and menaces Sybil. She calls for her father, who enters and is immediately attacked and murdered by Hyde. Hyde runs away; Jekyll returns and asks who has attacked them. With his dying breath, the vicar says it was Hyde.

In the second act, Inspector Newcomen shows Utterson part of the walking stick that Hyde used to club Howell. Utterson recognizes it as one he gave to Jekyll. Newcomen vows to find the killer, and asks to interview Sybil, who has been staying with Utterson since the murder. Jekyll visits Utterson with a letter from Hyde, claiming he has departed. When Jekyll leaves, Utterson's assistant, Mr. Guest, points out that the handwriting on the letter is very similar to Jekyll's. When Utterson leaves, Jekyll returns and delivers a monologue confessing that he is the murderer. After a brief conversation with Sybil, Jekyll leaves, and Utterson's niece Lilian brings in a group of choirboys from Howell's church, who sing a song for Sybil. Then Utterson and Newcomen return, saying they play to lay a trap for Hyde. Sybil insists on going with them. When Hyde approaches the vicarage, he is chased by the police.

In the third act, Utterson and the police discuss their failure to catch Hyde. Officer O'Brien says he thought Hyde came into the vicarage, but he saw Jekyll approaching him instead. Utterson tells the police that Jekyll has been allowing Hyde into his laboratory. Sybil overhears this and is distraught to learn that Jekyll has helped her father's killer. Sybil resolves to investigate the case herself by visiting Hyde's landlady, Mrs. Viley. Lilian goes with her. In return for money, Viley tells them that she has never met Jekyll, but has heard Hyde threaten repeatedly to kill him. Hyde returns home and attacks Viley when he learns she has received money from Sybil. Viley screams for the police and Hyde flees. In the act's final scene, Lanyon waits in his office with drugs from Jekyll's laboratory that he retrieved on written instructions from Jekyll. Hyde arrives to retrieve the drugs. In front of Lanyon, Hyde mixes the drugs and drinks the resulting potion, which transforms him into Jekyll.

The fourth act begins four months later. Lanyon has died of shock, and Jekyll refuses to see Utterson or Sybil. Sybil is still angry that Jekyll is believed to have helped Hyde; Lilian, who always disliked Jekyll, supports Sybil's anger. One of Jekyll's servants, Poole, visits to say he fears Jekyll has been murdered. Someone is secluded in Jekyll's study, claiming to be him and communicating mostly through written notes, but Poole thinks it is someone else. Utterson, Sybil, and Lilian agree to accompany Poole to confront the person in Jekyll's study. Utterson and Poole find Jekyll's servants huddled together in fear of the person in the study. In the study, Jekyll gives a monologue explaining that he can no longer find the ingredients for his potion, and therefore will soon revert to Hyde without the ability to transform back. Sybil comes to the study and sees that Jekyll appears ill. He tells her they will marry when he is better, but when she leaves he monologues that he will die soon, then he transforms into Hyde. When Utterson and Poole come to the study door, Hyde commits suicide by drinking poison.

== Characters ==
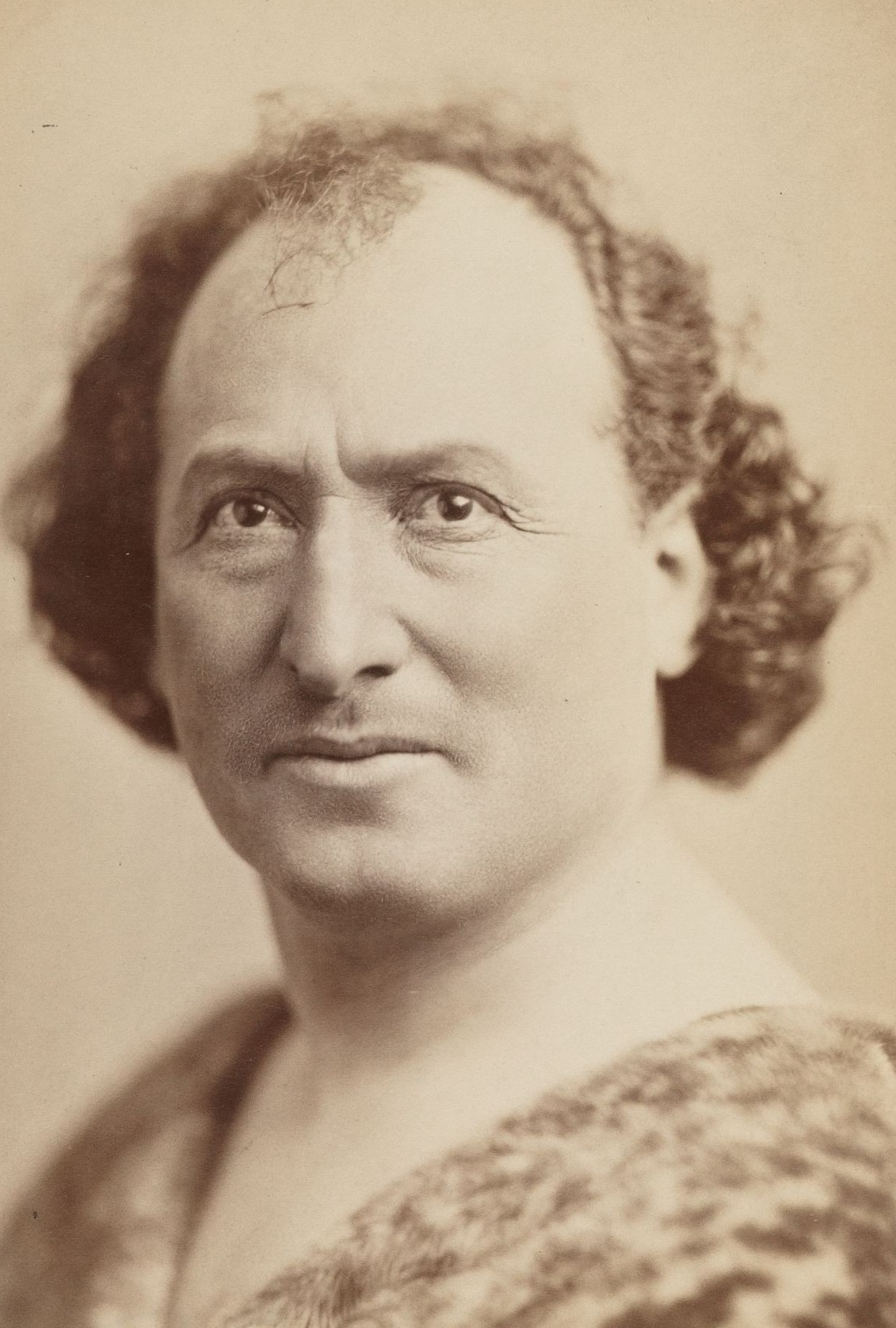
Daniel E. Bandmann commissioned and starred in the adaptation.

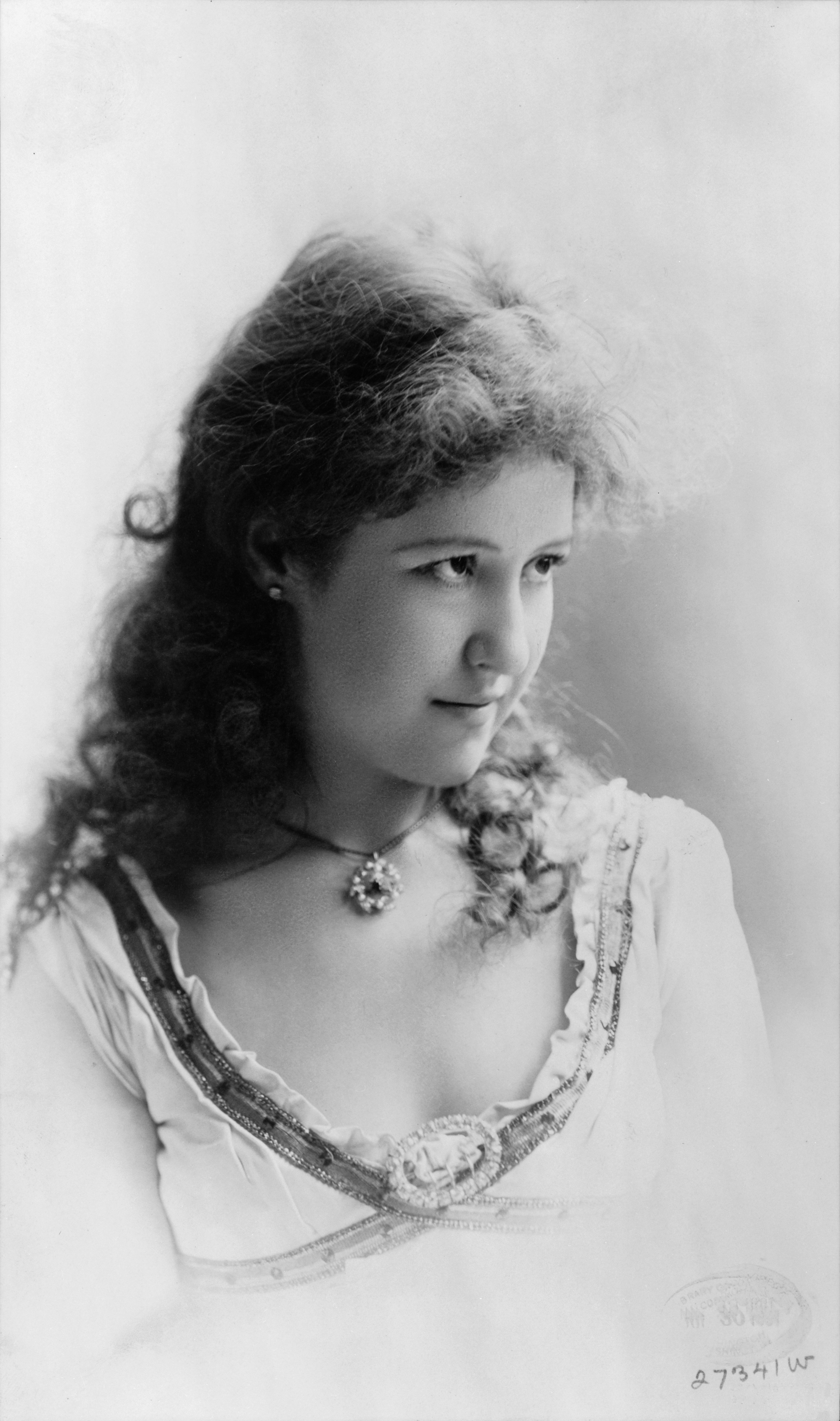
Louise Beaudet played Sybil Howell.

Cast of the Opera Comique production
Character	Cast
Dr. Jekyll/Mr. Hyde	Daniel E. Bandmann
J. G. Utterson	G. Herbert Leonard
Rev. William Howell	Sydney Price
Dr. Lanyon	Henry Loraine
Inspector Newcomen	Allen Thomas
Poole	Stanislaus Calhaem
Guest	Albert Bernard
O'Brien	Eardley Turner
Fielding	Frank Garnet
James	Henry Bayntun
Bradshaw	James S. R. Page
George	A. Williams
William	George Elliston
Little Willie	Master Burton
Eddie	Master Lilly
Frank	Master Horton
Johnnie	Master Cates
Sarah	Emily Stafford
Maria	Muriel Dale
Mrs. Viley	Ada Neilson
Lilian Utterson	Lilian Seccombe
Sybil Howell	Louise Beaudet

== History ==
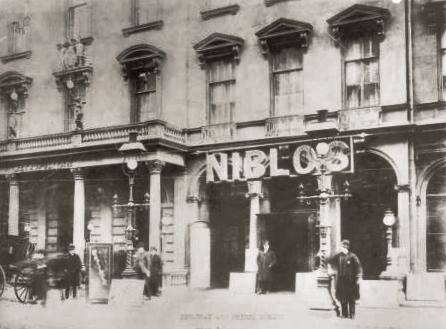
The play debuted at Niblo's Garden on March 12, 1888.

The Scottish author Robert Louis Stevenson wrote Strange Case of Dr Jekyll and Mr Hyde in 1885. In January 1886, it was published in the United Kingdom by Longmans, Green & Co. It was published that same month by Charles Scribner's Sons in the United States, where it was also frequently pirated due to the lack of copyright protections in the US for works originally published in the UK. Despite the opportunity to adapt without authorization, the actor Richard Mansfield secured permission for both the American and British stage rights in early 1887. Mansfield asked Boston writer Thomas Russell Sullivan to create the script. Their authorized adaptation debuted at the Boston Museum on May 9, 1887, under the title Dr. Jekyll and Mr. Hyde, with Mansfield starring in a dual role as both Jekyll and Hyde.

While the Mansfield production was touring the US, the German-American actor Daniel E. Bandmann developed an unauthorized adaptation, working with writer John McKinney. Bandmann's version made several changes to Stevenson's story that were similar to changes made in Sullivan's version. These changes included the addition of a romantic interest for Jekyll, and having that romantic interest's father be murdered by Hyde. However, Bandmann's adaptation included more women characters and gave them a larger role in the story, and also added scenes of comic relief. The new adaptation, also using the title Dr. Jekyll and Mr. Hyde, opened on Broadway at Niblo's Garden on March 12, 1888. The opening coincided with the Great Blizzard of 1888; only five customers braved the weather to see the debut. One of the attendees was Sullivan, who was checking on the competition. Bandmann's production motivated a letter from Stevenson to the New York Sun, stating that only the Mansfield version was authorized and paying him royalties.

Mansfield planned to take his adaptation to the Lyceum Theatre in London's West End in September 1888. Bandmann tried to get his own production to London ahead of Mansfield and reserved the Opera Comique theater starting on August 6. However, Mansfield recalled his company from vacation and rushed to London, where his production opened at the Lyceum on August 4. In the United Kingdom, unlike in the United States, the novel had copyright protection. Mansfield worked with Stevenson's publisher, Longmans, to launch legal actions against unauthorized adaptations. Bandmann's production opened as scheduled on August 6, but after just two performances it was closed due to legal action by Longmans. The rivalry between the two productions was covered throughout the summer in the London press.
