= Dr. Jekyll and Mr. Hyde (1887 play) =

Stage play by Thomas Russell Sullivan

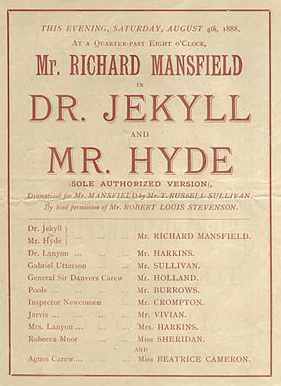
- Playbill for 1888 London production
- Written by: Thomas Russell Sullivan
- Based on: Strange Case of Dr Jekyll and Mr Hyde by Robert Louis Stevenson
- Characters: Henry Jekyll, Edward Hyde
- Original language: English
- Setting: London

Premiere
- Date premiered: May 9, 1887
- Place premiered: Boston Museum

Dr. Jekyll and Mr. Hyde is a four-act play written by Thomas Russell Sullivan in collaboration with the actor Richard Mansfield. It is an adaptation of Strange Case of Dr Jekyll and Mr Hyde, an 1886 novella by the Scottish author Robert Louis Stevenson. The story focuses on the respected London doctor Henry Jekyll and his involvement with Edward Hyde, a loathsome criminal. After Hyde murders the father of Jekyll's fiancée, Jekyll's friends discover that Jekyll and Hyde are the same person; Jekyll has developed a potion that allows him to transform himself into Hyde and back again. When he runs out of the potion, he is trapped as Hyde and commits suicide before he can be arrested.

After reading the novella, Mansfield was intrigued by the opportunity to play a dual role, having performed one in a different production. He secured the rights to adapt the story for the stage in the United States and the United Kingdom, and asked Sullivan to write the adaptation. The play debuted in Boston in May 1887, and a revised version opened on Broadway in September of that year. Critics acclaimed Mansfield's performance as the dual character. The play was popular in New York and on tour, and Mansfield was invited to bring it to London. It opened there in August 1888, just before one of the early Jack the Ripper murders. Some press reports compared the murderer to the Jekyll–Hyde character, and Mansfield was suggested as a possible suspect. Despite significant press coverage, the London production was a financial failure. Mansfield's company continued to perform the play on tours of the U.S. until shortly before his death in 1907.

In writing the stage adaptation, Sullivan made several changes to the story; these included creating a fiancée for Jekyll and a stronger moral contrast between Jekyll and Hyde. The changes have been adopted by many subsequent adaptations, including several film adaptations of the story derived from the play. The films included a 1912 adaptation directed by Lucius Henderson, a 1920 adaptation directed by John S. Robertson, and a 1931 adaptation directed by Rouben Mamoulian, which earned Fredric March an Academy Award for Best Actor. A 1941 adaptation, directed by Victor Fleming, was a remake of the 1931 film.

== Plot ==
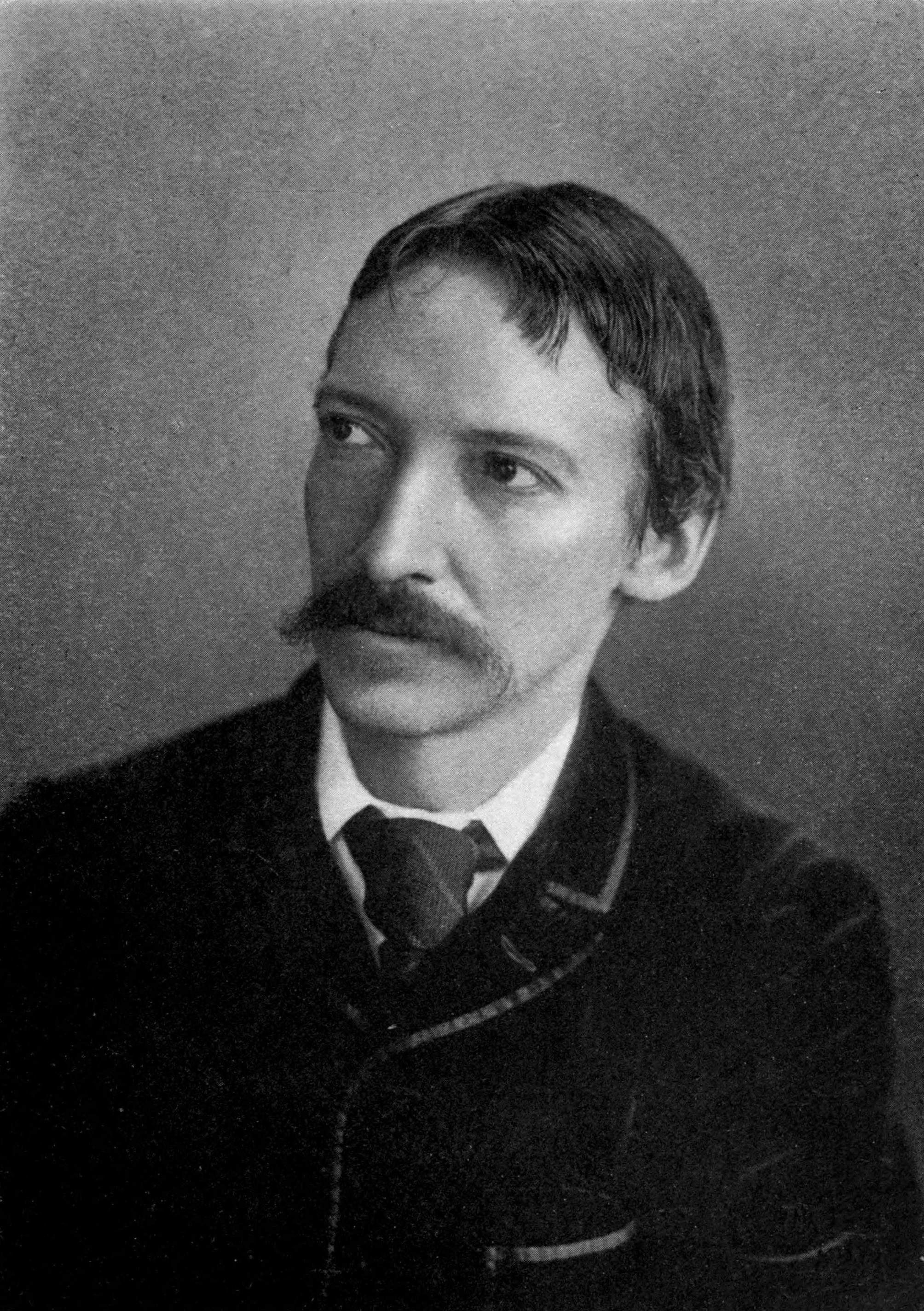
The story was adapted from a novella by Robert Louis Stevenson.

In the first act, a group of friends (including Sir Danvers Carew's daughter Agnes, attorney Gabriel Utterson, and Dr. and Mrs. Lanyon) meet at Sir Danvers' home. Dr. Lanyon brings word that Agnes' fiancé, Dr. Henry Jekyll, will be late to the gathering. He then repeats a second-hand story about a man named Hyde, who injured a child in a collision on the street. The story upsets Utterson because Jekyll recently made a new will that gives his estate to a mysterious friend named Edward Hyde. Jekyll arrives; Utterson confronts him about the will, but Jekyll refuses to consider changing it.

Jekyll tells Agnes that they should end their engagement because of sins he has committed but will not explain. Agnes refuses to accept this and tells Jekyll she loves him. He relents, saying that she will help him control himself, and leaves. Sir Danvers joins his daughter, and they talk about their time in Mangalore, India. When Hyde suddenly enters, Sir Danvers tells Agnes to leave the room. The men argue, and Hyde strangles Sir Danvers.

In the second act, Hyde fears that he will be arrested for the murder. He gives money to his landlady, Rebecca, to tell visitors that he is not home. Inspector Newcome from Scotland Yard offers Rebecca more money to turn Hyde in, which she promises to do. Hyde flees to Jekyll's laboratory, where Utterson is waiting to confront the doctor about his will; he insults Utterson and leaves. Rebecca, who has followed Hyde, arrives and tells Utterson that Hyde murdered Sir Danvers. In the play's original version, the act ends with Jekyll returning to his laboratory. In later versions (revised after its premiere), the second act contains an additional scene in which Jekyll returns home; his friends think he is protecting Hyde. Agnes, who saw Hyde before her father was murdered, wants Jekyll to accompany her to provide the police with a description, and is distraught when he refuses.

In the third act, Jekyll's servant, Poole, gives Dr. Lanyon a powder and liquid with instructions from Jekyll to give them to a person who will request them. While he waits, Lanyon speaks with Newcome, Rebecca, Agnes and Mrs. Lanyon. After the others leave, Hyde arrives for the powder and liquid. After arguing with Lanyon, he mixes them into a potion and drinks it; he immediately transforms into Jekyll.

In the final act, Jekyll has begun to change into Hyde without using the potion. Although he still needs it to change back, he has exhausted his supply. Dr. Lanyon tries to help Jekyll re-create the formula, but they are unable to find an ingredient. Jekyll asks Lanyon to bring Agnes to him, but Jekyll turns into Hyde before Lanyon returns. Utterson and Newcome arrive to arrest Hyde; knowing he can no longer transform back into Jekyll, Hyde commits suicide by taking poison.

== Cast and characters ==
The play was produced at the Boston Museum, Broadway's Madison Square Theatre and the Lyceum Theatre in London's West End with the following casts:

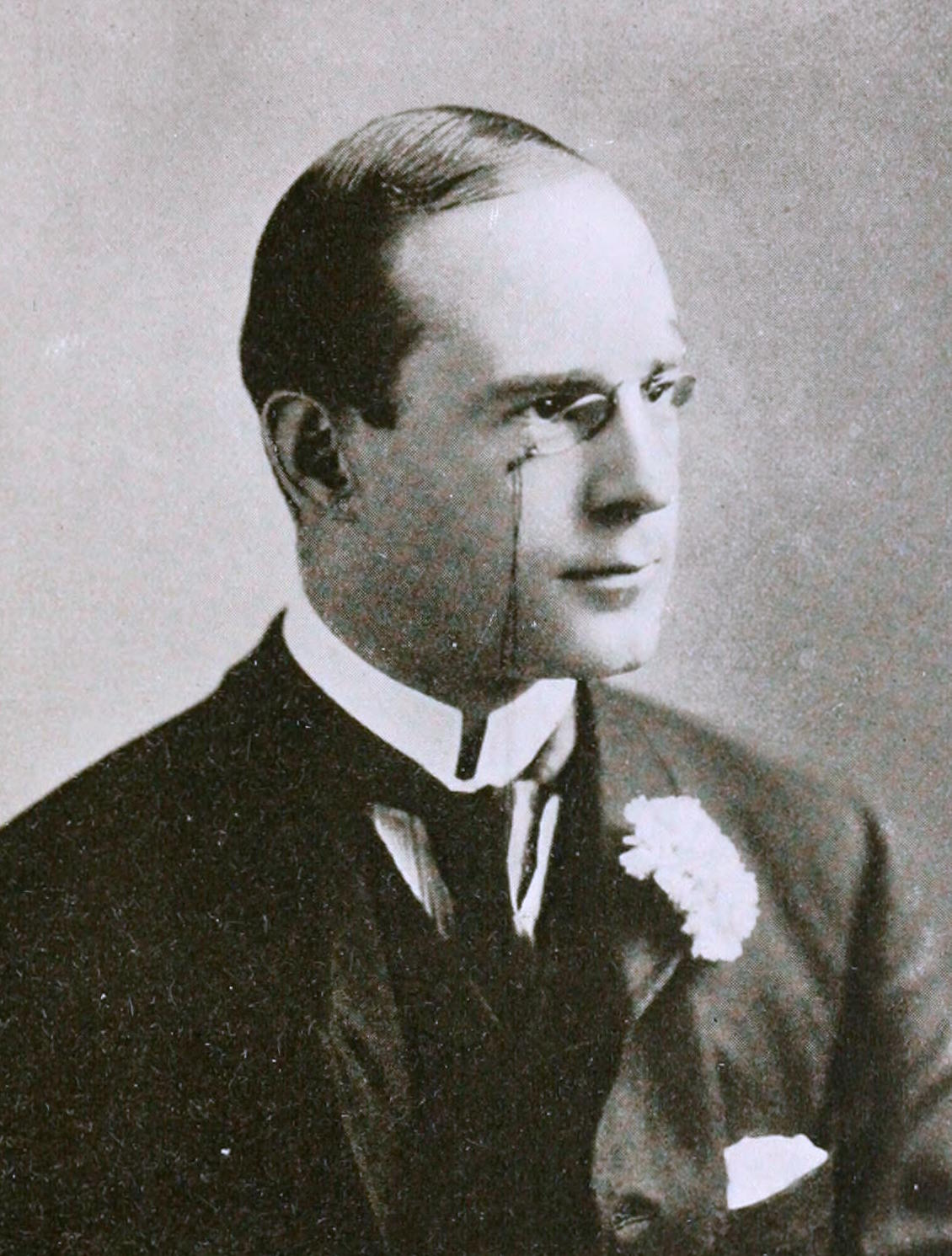
Richard Mansfield commissioned and starred in the adaptation.

Casts of the major productions
Character	Boston cast	Broadway cast	West End cast
Dr. Jekyll, Mr. Hyde	Richard Mansfield	Richard Mansfield	Richard Mansfield
General Sir Danvers Carew	Boyd Putnam	H. B. Bradley	Mr. Holland
Dr. Lanyon	Alfred Hudson	Daniel H. Harkins	Daniel H. Harkins
Gabriel Utterson	Frazier Coulter	John T. Sullivan	John T. Sullivan
Poole	James Burrows	Harry Gwynette	J. C. Burrows
Inspector Newcome	Arthur Falkland	C. E. Eldridge	W. H. Compton
Jarvis	J. K. Applebee, Jr.	Thomas Goodwin	F. Vivian
Mrs. Lanyon	Kate Ryan	Katherine Rogers	Mrs. Daniel H. Harkins
Agnes Carew	Isabelle Evesson	Beatrice Cameron	Beatrice Cameron
Rebecca Moore	Emma V. Sheridan	Helen Glidden	Emma V. Sheridan

== History ==
=== Background and writing ===
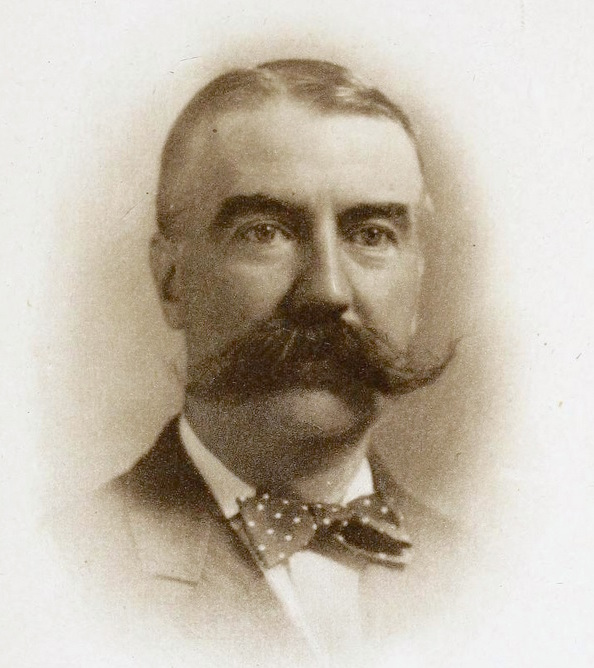
Thomas Russell Sullivan wrote the play in 1887.

The Scottish author Robert Louis Stevenson wrote Strange Case of Dr Jekyll and Mr Hyde in 1885 when he was living in Bournemouth, on England's south coast. In January 1886 the novella was published in the United Kingdom by Longmans, Green & Co. and by Charles Scribner's Sons in the United States, where it was frequently pirated because of the lack of copyright protection in the US for works originally published in the UK. In early 1887, actor Richard Mansfield read Stevenson's novella and immediately decided to adapt it for the stage. Mansfield was looking for material that would help him achieve a reputation as a serious actor in the US (where he resided) and in England (where he had spent most of his childhood). He had already played a father and son in a New York production of the operetta Rip Van Winkle, and he recognized playing Jekyll and Hyde would be another acting opportunity to play dual roles. He thought the role was a theatrical novelty that would showcase his talents in a favorable way.

Although US copyright law would have allowed him to produce an unauthorized adaptation, Mansfield secured the American and British stage rights. While performing in Boston, he asked a local friend, Thomas Russell Sullivan, to write a script. Sullivan had previously only written in his spare time while working as a clerk for Lee, Higginson & Co., a Boston investment bank. Although he doubted that the novella would make a good play, he agreed to help Mansfield with the project, and they worked quickly to complete the adaptation before other, unauthorized versions could be staged.

=== First American productions ===
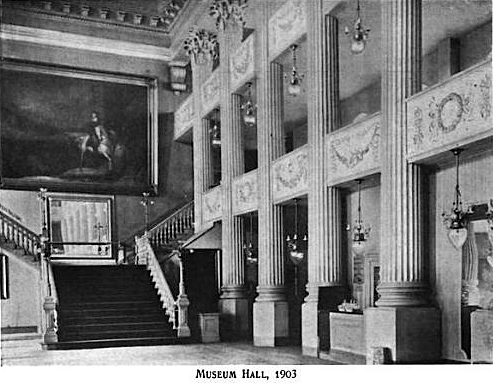
The play premiered at the Boston Museum on May 9, 1887.

After just two weeks of rehearsals, the play opened at the Boston Museum on May 9, 1887, as the first American adaptation of Stevenson's novella. (Note: A parody of Strange Case of Dr Jekyll and Mr Hyde called The Strange Case of a Hyde and Seekyll was staged in London at Toole's Theatre on May 18, 1886.) On May 14, it closed for rewrites. The updated version opened at the Madison Square Theatre on Broadway on September 12. A. M. Palmer produced and Richard Marston designed the sets for the production. Sullivan invited Stevenson, who had moved to the US that summer; Stevenson was ill, but his wife and mother attended and congratulated Sullivan on the play. The Madison Square production closed on October 1, when Mansfield took his company on a nationwide tour. The tour began at the Chestnut Street Theatre in Philadelphia and visited over a dozen cities, including several returns to Boston and New York. It ended at the Madison Square Theatre, where Dr. Jekyll and Mr. Hyde was performed for a final matinee of the season on June 29, 1888.

In March 1888, while Mansfield's company was touring, Daniel E. Bandmann staged a competing production with the same name at Niblo's Garden. Bandmann's opening night (March 12) coincided with the Great Blizzard of 1888, and only five theatergoers braved the storm. One of the attendees was Sullivan, who was checking his competition. Bandmann's production inspired a letter from Stevenson to the New York Sun saying that only the Mansfield version was authorized and paying him royalties.

=== 1888 London production ===
The English actor Henry Irving saw Mansfield's performance in New York and invited him to bring the play to London, where Irving managed the Lyceum Theatre in the West End. Although the play was scheduled to premiere in September 1888, Mansfield discovered that Bandmann planned to open his competing version in August, and he rushed to recall his company from vacation.

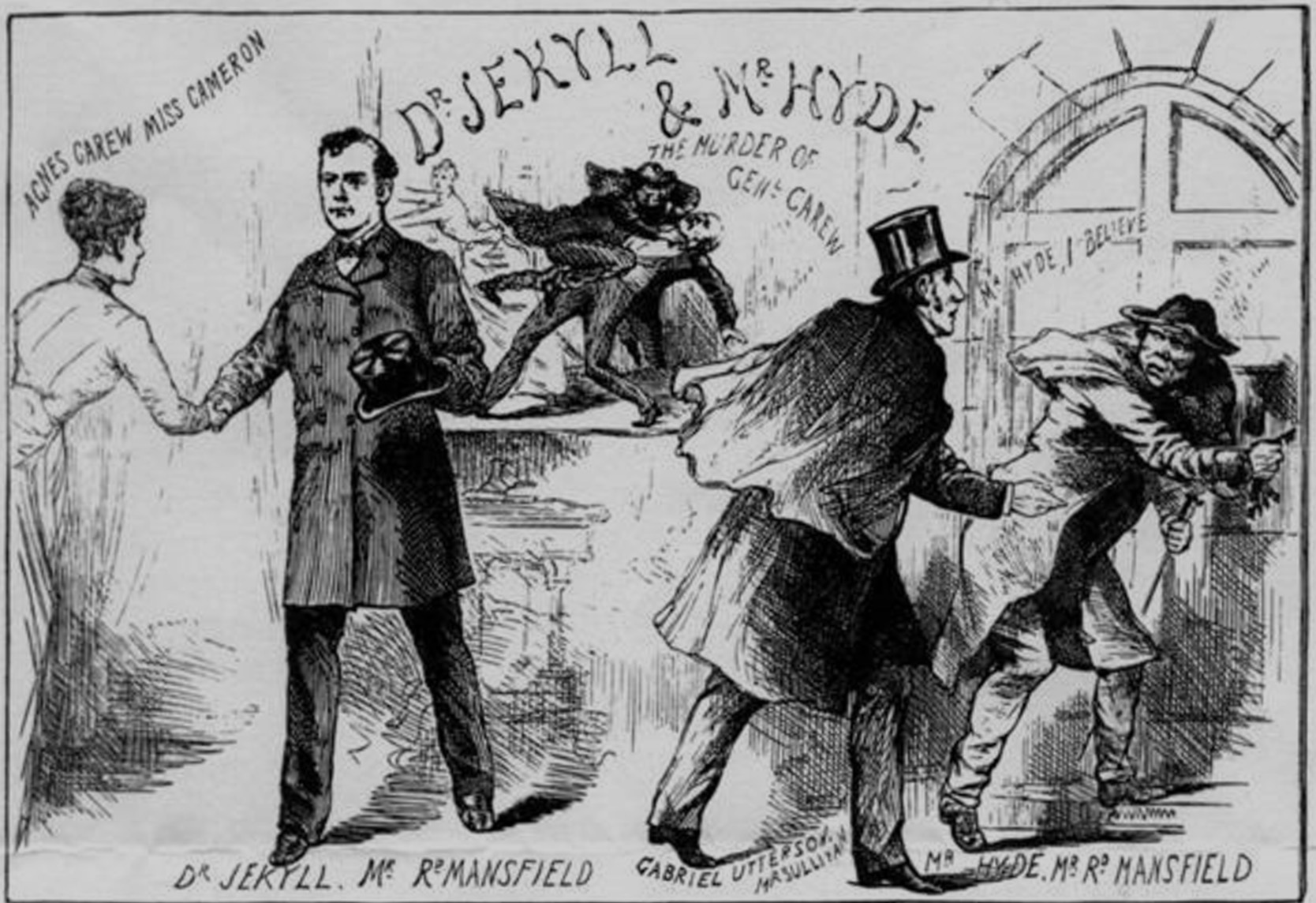
Penny Illustrated Paper illustration of scenes from the Lyceum production

Mansfield worked with Irving and Stevenson's publisher, Longmans, to block Bandmann's production and those of other competitors. In the UK, unlike the US, the novella had copyright protection. Longmans brought legal actions against the unauthorized versions; its efforts blocked a William Howell Poole production from opening at the Theatre Royal in Croydon on July 26. That day, Fred Wright's Company B presented one performance of its adaptation at the Park Theatre in Merthyr Tydfil before it was also closed. Bandmann had the Opera Comique theater reserved from August 6, but hoped to open his production earlier. Irving blocked this by reserving the theater for Mansfield's rehearsals, and Mansfield's Dr. Jekyll and Mr. Hyde opened at the Lyceum on August 4. Bandmann went ahead with his August 6 opening, but after two performances the production was shut down because of legal action by Longmans.

Although Irving attended some of Mansfield's rehearsals, he did not remain in London for the opening. Mansfield worked with Irving's stage manager, H. J. Lovejoy, and "acting manager" Bram Stoker (who would later write the horror novel Dracula) to stage the production. He was dissatisfied with Lovejoy's stagehands and complained to a friend, the drama critic William Winter, that they were "slow" and "argumentative". Since the Lyceum crew had staged many productions and had a good reputation, Winter thought it more likely that they disliked Mansfield. Regardless of the crew's motives, Mansfield became antagonistic toward Irving during his time there.

The Lyceum production of Dr. Jekyll and Mr. Hyde was scheduled to close on September 29, after which Mansfield intended to stage other plays. Initially, he followed this plan, introducing productions of Lesbia and A Parisian Romance at the beginning of October. However, Mansfield soon reintroduced Dr. Jekyll and Mr. Hyde to his schedule and added performances between October 10 and October 20.

=== Association with Whitechapel murders ===
On August 7, 1888, three days after the Lyceum opening of Dr. Jekyll and Mr. Hyde, Martha Tabram was discovered stabbed to death in London's Whitechapel neighborhood. On August 31, Mary Ann Nichols was found, murdered and mutilated, in the same neighborhood. Press coverage linking these and other Whitechapel murders of women created a furor in London. The public and police suspected that some or all of the murders were committed by one person, who became known as Jack the Ripper. Some press reports compared the unidentified killer with the Jekyll and Hyde characters, suggesting that the Ripper led a respectable life during the day and became a murderer at night. On October 5, the City of London Police received a letter suggesting that Mansfield should be considered a suspect. The letter writer, who had seen him perform as Jekyll and Hyde, thought that Mansfield could easily disguise himself and commit the murders undetected.

Mansfield attempted to defuse public concern by staging the London opening of the comedy Prince Karl as a charity performance, despite Stoker's warning that critics would view it as an attempt to obtain favorable publicity for the production. Although some press reports suggested that Mansfield stopped performing Dr. Jekyll and Mr. Hyde in London because of the murders, financial reasons are more likely. Despite widespread publicity due to the murders and Mansfield's disputes with Bandmann, attendance was mediocre, and the production was losing money. On December 1, Mansfield's tenancy at the Lyceum ended. He left London, taking his company on a tour of England. In December they performed Dr. Jekyll and Mr. Hyde and other plays in Liverpool and Derby, then continued to other cities and performed other plays.

=== After 1888 ===
When Mansfield left the UK in June 1889, he was deeply in debt because of production losses there. His debts included £2,675 owed to Irving, which Mansfield did not want to pay because he felt that Irving had not supported him adequately at the Lyceum. Irving sued, winning the UK performance rights to Dr. Jekyll and Mr. Hyde, and Mansfield never performed in England again.

In the US, the play became part of the repertory of Mansfield's company and was repeatedly performed during the 1890s and early 1900s. Mansfield continued in the title role, and Beatrice Cameron continued to play Jekyll's fiancée. The actors married in 1892. In later years, he staged the play less often, after becoming fearful that something would go wrong during the transformation scenes. From 1904 to 1907, the company performed the play at the New Amsterdam Theatre in New York, where their final performance of it was staged on March 21, 1907. Mansfield fell ill soon afterward, and he died on August 30 of that year.

The play was closely associated with Mansfield's performance; a 1916 retrospective on adaptations of Stevenson's works indicated that Sullivan's Dr. Jekyll and Mr. Hyde was no longer performed after Mansfield's death. Although Irving obtained the UK performance rights, he never staged the play. His son, Harry Brodribb Irving, produced a new adaptation by J. Comyns Carr in 1910. By that time, more than a dozen other stage adaptations had appeared; the most significant was an 1897 adaptation by Luella Forepaugh and George F. Fish, made available in 1904 for stock theater performances as Dr. Jekyll and Mr. Hyde, Or a Mis-Spent Life.

== Dramatic analysis ==
=== Jekyll–Hyde transformation ===
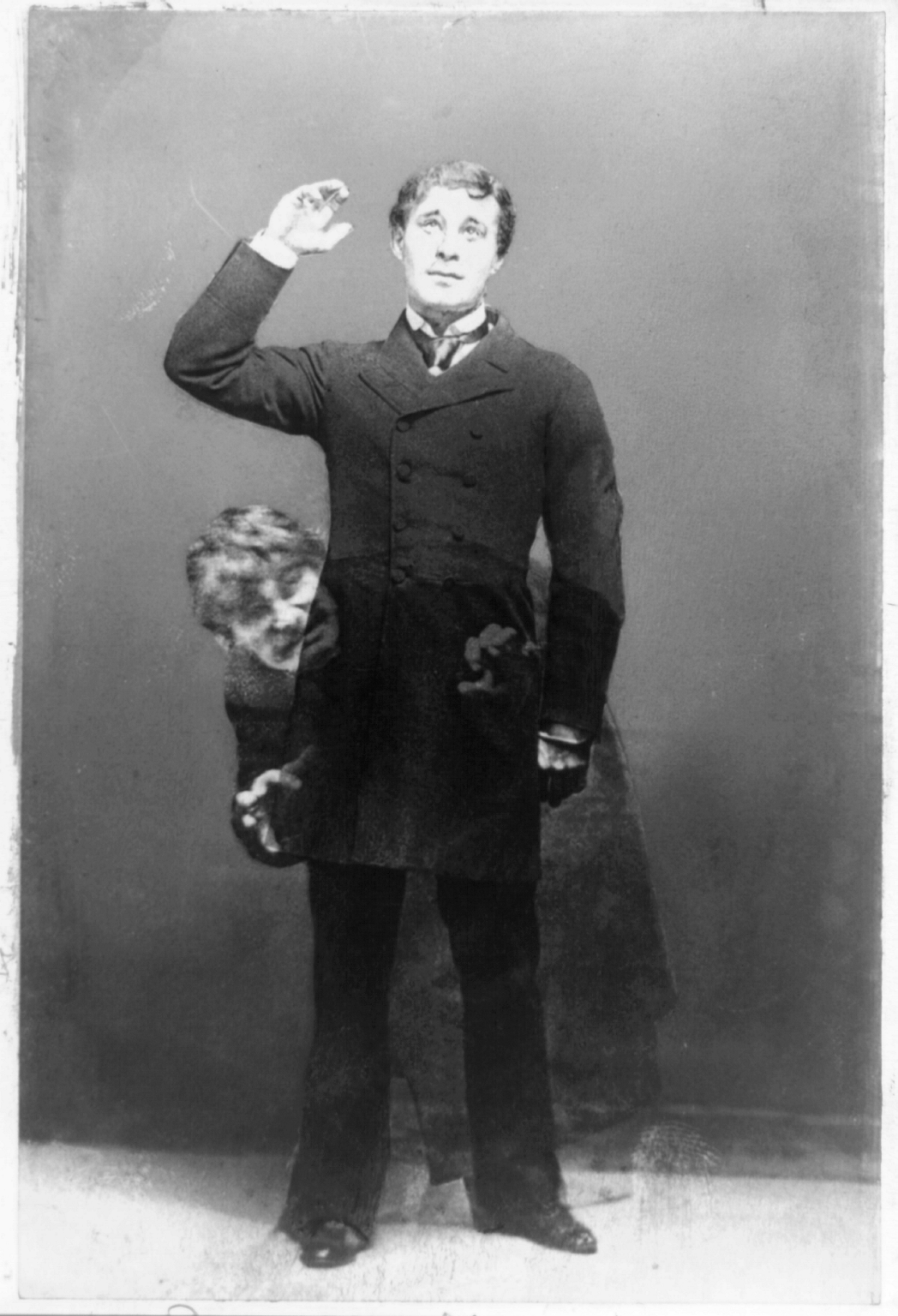
Mansfield's dual performance, captured in a double exposure by the photographer Henry Van der Weyde

Although Mansfield's transformations between Jekyll and Hyde included lighting changes and makeup designed to appear different under colored filters, it was mainly accomplished by the actor's facial contortions and changes in posture and movement. As Hyde, Mansfield was hunched over with a grimacing face and claw-like hands; he spoke with a guttural voice and walked differently than he did as Jekyll. The effect was so dramatic that audiences and journalists speculated about how it was achieved. Theories included claims that Mansfield had an inflatable rubber prosthetic, that he applied chemicals, and that he had a mask hidden in a wig, which he pulled down to complete the change. Mansfield denied such theories, emphasizing that he did not use any "mechanical claptrap" in his performance.

In contrast to the novella, in which the physical transformation of Jekyll into Hyde is revealed near the end, most dramatic adaptations show it early in the play, because the audience is familiar with the story. As one of its first adapters, Sullivan worked in an environment where the transformation would still shock the audience, and he held the reveal until the third act.

=== Changes from the novella ===
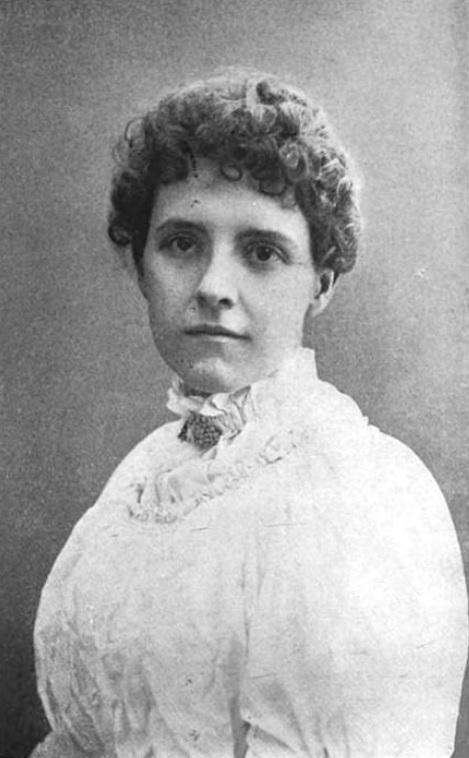
Beatrice Cameron played Agnes Carew, a character created for the play as Jekyll's romantic interest.

There were several differences between Sullivan's adaptation and Stevenson's novella. Stevenson used multiple narrators and a circular narrative (allowing material presented at the end to explain material presented at the beginning), but Sullivan wrote a linear narrative in chronological order. This linear approach and the onstage action conveyed a stronger impression of realism, eliminating uncertainties in Stevenson's narrative. Although making the story more straightforward and less ambiguous was not necessary for a theatrical adaptation, Sullivan's approach was typical of the era's stage melodramas and made the material more acceptable to audiences. The stage presentation's realism also allowed Sullivan to drop the novella's scientific aspects. Although Stevenson used science to make the Jekyll–Hyde transformation plausible to readers, Sullivan could rely on the onstage transformations. In the novella, the transformation is only presented via the account of Lanyon, never as direct narration to the reader.

The playwright strengthened the contrast between Jekyll and Hyde compared to Stevenson's original; Sullivan's Hyde was more explicitly evil, and his Jekyll more conventional. In Stevenson's novella Jekyll is socially isolated and neurotic, and his motives for experimenting with the potion are ambiguous. Sullivan's adaptation changed these elements of the character. His Jekyll is socially active and mentally healthy, and his motives for creating the potion are benign; Sullivan's Jekyll tells Lanyon that his discovery will "benefit the world". Later adaptations made further changes, representing Jekyll as noble, religious or involved in charitable work. Mansfield's portrayal of Jekyll is less stereotypically good than later versions, and he thought that making the characterizations too simplistic would hurt the play's dramatic quality.

Sullivan's version added women to the story; there were no significant female characters in Stevenson's original. The presence of women (especially Jekyll's fiancée, Agnes Carew) placed Jekyll in traditional social relationships, which made him seem more normal by contemporaneous standards. Hyde behaved lecherously towards Agnes and cruelly towards his landlady, and his behavior towards women in this and later adaptations led to new interpretations of the character. In Stevenson's novella and Sullivan's play, Hyde is said to have committed unspecified crimes. Interpreters began to identify the crimes as sexual, positing sexual repression as a factor in Hyde's characterization. However, Stevenson denied that this was his understanding of the character in his original story; he said Hyde's immoralities were "cruelty and malice, and selfishness and cowardice", not sexual.

In some interpretations of the novella, the male characters represent patriarchal society, with Hyde signifying its moral corruption. Other interpretations suggest that the lack of female companionship for the male characters indicates their latent homosexuality and that Hyde is engaged in homosexual activity. These interpretations are harder to apply to the play because of Sullivan's addition of female characters and heterosexual relationships.

Mansfield and his American theatre company pronounced Jekyll with a short e (/ɛ/) instead of the long e (/iː/) pronunciation Stevenson intended. The short e pronunciation is now used in most adaptations.

== Reception ==
Reviewing the play's initial production at the Boston Museum, The Boston Post "warmly congratulated" Sullivan on his script and said that it overcame the difficulties of turning Stevenson's story into a drama with only a few flaws. Mansfield's performance was praised for drawing a clear distinction between Jekyll and Hyde, although the reviewer found his portrayal of Hyde better crafted than his portrayal of Jekyll. Audience reaction was enthusiastic, with long applause and several curtain calls for Mansfield. According to The Cambridge Tribune, the audience reaction affirmed "that the play and its production were a work of genius".

The Broadway production also received positive reviews. When it opened at the Madison Square Theatre, a New York Times reviewer complimented Mansfield for his acting and for overcoming the difficulty of presenting the story's allegorical material onstage. According to a New-York Daily Tribune reviewer, Mansfield gave excellent performances as Jekyll and Hyde despite a few technical production flaws. A Life review praised Sullivan's adaptation, particularly his addition of a love interest for Jekyll, and complimented the performances of Mansfield, Cameron and Harkins.

The Lyceum production received mixed reviews, complimenting Mansfield's performance but criticizing the play as a whole. A Sunday Times reviewer appreciated Mansfield's performance as Hyde and in the transformation scenes, but not as Jekyll, and called the overall play "dismal and wearisome in the extreme". According to a Daily Telegraph review, Stevenson's story was unsuitable for drama and Sullivan had not adapted it well, but the performances of Mansfield and his company were praiseworthy. A review in The Saturday Review criticized Sullivan's adaptation, saying that it presented only one aspect of the Jekyll character from Stevenson's story. The reviewer complimented Mansfield's acting, especially in the transformation scenes, but said that his performance could not salvage the play. A review in The Theatre said that the play itself was not good, but it was an effective showcase for Mansfield's performance.

Sharon Aronofsky Weltman summarizes the reception for Mansfield's performance as being mostly critical of his presentation of Jekyll, but universally positive about his performance as Hyde and his handling of the transformation between the two personas.

== Legacy ==
A 1920 film adaptation starring John Barrymore was derived from the play.

Dr. Jekyll and Mr. Hyde was a milestone in the careers of Sullivan and Mansfield. Sullivan left his banking job to become a full-time writer. He wrote three more plays (none successful), several novels, and a two-volume collection of short stories, many of which have Gothic elements. Sullivan attempted one more stage collaboration with Mansfield, a drama about the Roman emperor Nero, but they became estranged after its failure. For the actor, playing Jekyll and Hyde helped establish his reputation for dramatic roles; he had been known primarily for comedies. Mansfield continued to struggle financially (in part because of his elaborate, expensive productions) before he achieved financial stability in the mid-1890s with a string of successful tours and new productions.

=== Influence on later adaptations ===
As the most successful early adaptation of Strange Case of Dr Jekyll and Mr Hyde, Sullivan's play influenced subsequent versions. Later adaptations followed his simplification of the narrative, addition of women characters (especially a romance for Jekyll) and highlighting of the moral contrast between Jekyll and Hyde. Most versions retain the practice of having one actor play Jekyll and Hyde, with the transformation seen by the audience. Several early film versions relied more on Sullivan's play than Stevenson's novella. (Note: Other early film adaptations did not draw from Sullivan's version. These included a 1908 film of a theatrical performance, which was an abbreviation of the 1897 play by Forepaugh and Fish.)

The Thanhouser Company produced a 1912 film version, directed by Lucius Henderson and starring James Cruze. The one-reel film, based on Sullivan's play, may be an exception to the custom of one actor playing Jekyll and Hyde. Although Cruze was credited with a dual role, Harry Benham (who played the father of Jekyll's fiancée), said in 1963 that he had played Hyde in some scenes.

In 1920, Famous Players–Lasky produced a feature-length version directed by John S. Robertson. (Note: A second Dr. Jekyll and Mr. Hyde movie, written and directed by J. Charles Haydon, was also released in 1920. The Haydon film is not based on Sullivan's play and is very loosely adapted from Stevenson's novella.) John Barrymore starred as Jekyll and Hyde, with Martha Mansfield as his fiancée. Clara Beranger's script followed Sullivan's play in having Jekyll engaged to Sir Carew's daughter, but also added a relationship between Hyde and an Italian dancer (played by Nita Naldi). The addition of a female companion for Hyde became a feature of many later adaptations. Weltman says the design for Hyde's residence in the movie may have been influenced by Mansfield's set decoration choices, based on descriptions given in contemporary reviews of the play.

The first sound film based on Sullivan's play was a 1931 version, produced and directed by Rouben Mamoulian and distributed by Paramount Pictures. The film's writers, Samuel Hoffenstein and Percy Heath, followed much of Sullivan's storyline. Their screenplay adds a female companion for Hyde similar to Robertson's 1920 version, but Hyde murders her, a plot point that Weltman believes was influenced by the real-world association of the play with Jack the Ripper. Hoffenstein and Heath were nominated for the Academy Award for Best Adapted Screenplay, and the cinematographer Karl Struss was nominated for the Academy Award for Best Cinematography. Fredric March won the Academy Award for Best Actor for his portrayal of Jekyll and Hyde.

Metro-Goldwyn-Mayer released a 1941 film which was a remake of Mamoulian's 1931 film. Victor Fleming directed, and Spencer Tracy starred. This version was nominated for three Academy Awards: Joseph Ruttenberg for Best Cinematography, Black-and-White; Harold F. Kress for Best Film Editing, and Franz Waxman for Best Score of a Dramatic Picture.

According to the film historian Denis Meikle, Robertson, Mamoulian, and Fleming's films followed a pattern set by Sullivan's play: making Hyde's evil sexual and the Jekyll–Hyde transformation central to the performance. Meikle views this as a deterioration of Stevenson's original narrative initiated by Sullivan. The literary scholar Edwin M. Eigner says of the play and movies based on it that "each [adaptation] did its bit to coarsen Stevenson's ideas". Weltman says the play's association with Jack the Ripper also affected many adaptions, such as the 1971 film Dr. Jekyll and Sister Hyde and the 1990 Broadway musical Jekyll & Hyde. However, many later adaptations diverged from the model established by Sullivan and the early films; some returned to Stevenson's novella, and others spun new variations from aspects of earlier versions.
