= Dr. Jekyll and Mr. Hyde (1920 Paramount film) =

1920 American silent film by John S. Robertson

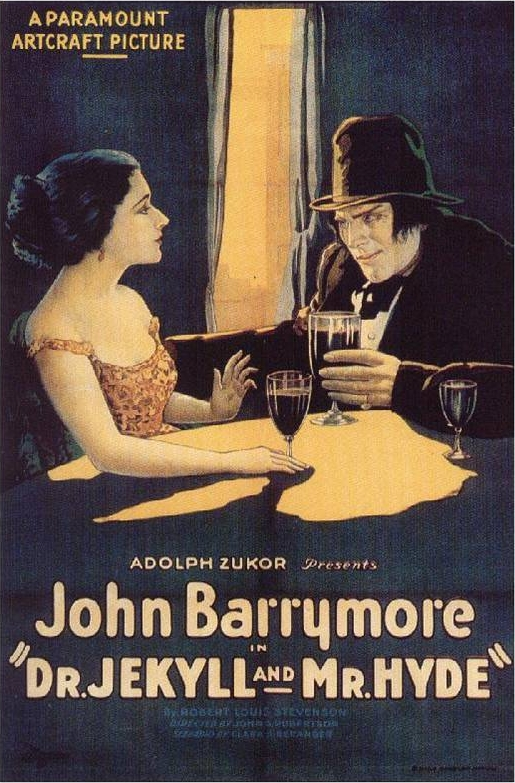
- Theatrical release poster
- Directed by: John S. Robertson
- Written by: Clara Beranger; Thomas Russell Sullivan (1887 stage play)
- Based on: Strange Case of Dr Jekyll and Mr Hyde by Robert Louis Stevenson
- Produced by: Adolph Zukor; Jesse L. Lasky
- Starring: John Barrymore; Martha Mansfield; Charles W. Lane; Nita Naldi
- Cinematography: Roy F. Overbaugh
- Production company: Famous Players–Lasky/Artcraft Pictures
- Distributed by: Paramount Pictures
- Release date: March 28, 1920 (New York premiere)
- Running time: 79 minutes
- Country: United States
- Languages: Silent film English intertitles

Dr. Jekyll and Mr. Hyde is a 1920 American silent horror film produced by Famous Players–Lasky and released through Paramount/Artcraft. The film, which stars John Barrymore, is an adaptation of the 1886 novella Strange Case of Dr Jekyll and Mr Hyde by Robert Louis Stevenson. John S. Robertson directed the production, and Clara Beranger wrote the screenplay, based on the 1887 stage play by Thomas Russell Sullivan that in turn was based on the novel. Set in late Victorian London, the film portrays the tragic consequences of a doctor's experiments in separating the dual personalities he thinks define all humans: one good, the other evil. The film is now in the public domain.

== Plot ==
Dr. Jekyll and Mr. Hyde (1920)

Dr. Henry Jekyll lives and works in London. When not treating the poor at his free clinic, he works long hours in his laboratory, leaving little time for his sweetheart, Millicent. Sir George Carew, Millicent's father, is irritated by Jekyll's highmindedness, observing that "No man could be as good as he looks." After dinner one evening, Sir George lectures Jekyll about his lifestyle, insisting that every man is fundamentally composed of two "selves" which are in continual conflict. He opines that "a man cannot destroy the savage in him by denying its impulses", and that "the only way to get rid of a temptation is to yield to it." He takes Jekyll to a nightclub and arranges a liaison with Gina, one of the dancers. Jekyll backs away.

Reflecting on Sir George's comments, Jekyll begins private research into ways of separating out the two basic natures of man, the good and the evil. He manages to develop a potion that transforms him into a hideous, evil counterpart that he calls "Hyde", along with a counter-potion to reverse the effect. As Hyde, Jekyll is not recognizable as himself, so to facilitate his evil counterpart's access to his home and laboratory, the doctor informs his servant Poole that his friend Mr. Hyde is to have full access.

Jekyll begins to live a double life: by day a compassionate and gentlemanly doctor, and by night a lustful, hunchbacked creature who ventures out to opium dens, bars, and music halls to satisfy his "dark indulgences". He rents a small furnished room and brings Gina to live with him. Soon, however, Hyde tires of her company and ejects her. Each time Jekyll takes the potion to become Hyde, he becomes increasingly depraved and physically more hideous.

Jekyll neglects Millicent, who is alarmed by his absence. Sir George calls on the doctor, but he is not at home. In a nearby street, Hyde knocks a small boy to the ground. To make recompense, he goes to the doctor's home and returns with a cheque which he gives to the injured boy's father. Sir George notices that the cheque has been signed by Dr. Jekyll.

Sir George hastens to the doctor's laboratory, where he confronts Jekyll and demands to know about his relationship with Hyde. His threat to refuse consent to his daughter's marriage triggers Jekyll's retransformation back to his evil form. Horrified at witnessing the change, Sir George flees. Hyde catches him in the courtyard and beats him to death with his walking stick. After destroying any evidence that might link him to Jekyll, Hyde returns to the laboratory where he drinks the last of the counter-potion.

In the ensuing days, while Millicent mourns over her father’s murder, Jekyll is tormented by the thoughts of his misdeeds as Hyde. Unable to procure further supplies of the drug needed to make the counter-potion, Jekyll confines himself to his locked laboratory, fearing he might become Hyde at any moment.

Millicent finally goes to see him, and as she knocks on the door he begins to transform. After letting her in and locking the door, Hyde takes the terrified Millicent into his arms. Suddenly, he starts convulsing. Millicent shouts for help, attracting Poole and two of Jekyll's friends. They enter to find Hyde sitting in a chair, dead, having taken poison. They watch with astonishment as Hyde transforms back into the doctor. As the film ends, Millicent grieves next to the body of her suitor.

== Cast ==
- John Barrymore as Dr. Henry Jekyll / Mr. Hyde / giant spider in dream
- Martha Mansfield as Millicent Carew, Sir George's daughter
- Nita Naldi as Gina, Italian exotic dancer
- Brandon Hurst as Sir George Carew
- Charles Willis Lane as Dr. Richard Lanyon, friend of Jekyll
- Cecil Clovelly as Edward Enfield
- Louis Wolheim as music hall proprietor
- J. Malcolm Dunn as John Utterson, friend of Jekyll

=== Uncredited ===
- George Stevens as Poole, Jekyll's butler
- Alma Aiken as distraught woman in Jekyll's office
- Julia Hurley as Hyde's old landlady
- Edgard Varèse as policeman
- Blanche Ring as woman with elderly man in music hall
- Ferdinand Gottschalk as elderly man in music hall
- May Robson as old harridan standing outside music hall

== Production notes ==
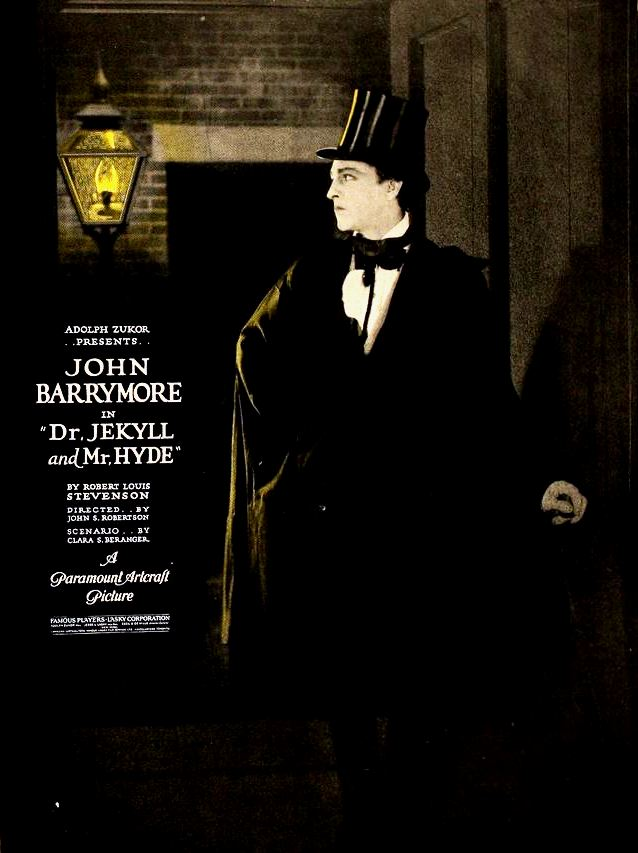
An 1920 film advertisement depicting the dashing and “good” Dr. Henry Jekyll

- The early part of Jekyll's initial transformation into Hyde was achieved with no makeup, instead relying solely on Barrymore's ability to contort his face and body. The first time Hyde reverts to Jekyll, one of Hyde's prosthetic fingers can be seen flying across the screen, having been shaken loose by Barrymore's convulsions.
- After Nita Naldi's death in 1961, The New York Times noted in its obituary of the actress that it was John Barrymore who had "obtained a part for her in the film, 'Dr. Jekyll and Mr. Hyde,'" after he "spotted" her dancing at the Winter Garden Theatre in Manhattan.

== 1920 screenplay alterations ==
- The character of Millicent Carew does not appear in Stevenson's original novel, but rather in the 1887 stage version by Thomas Russell Sullivan starring Richard Mansfield. This 1920 film version used the play's concept of Jekyll being engaged to Carew's daughter, and Hyde beginning a dalliance with an attractive yet chaste dance-hall girl whom he destroys, to inject a coarse sexual undercurrent into Hyde's personality that Stevenson did not include in his novel.
- Beranger's screenplay strayed further from Stevenson's novel than any of the previous silent film adaptations, depicting Dr. Jekyll as a handsome, selfless, charitable saint, so "beautiful" physically as to appear "almost Godlike". She even noted that a halo effect should appear around him in certain scenes, while the character in the novel (a much older man) had by this stage in his life indulged in many guilty pleasures and was "duplicitous" to his friends.
- Beranger also has Hyde transform back into the handsome Dr. Jekyll after he dies from the poison, his profile shown in a beatific close-up, hinting that he has redeemed himself through suicide. In the novel, Stevenson has Jekyll die as Hyde and be forced to remain in "that damning form" for all eternity.
- Troy Howarth notes that this was the first adaptation of the novel that elevated the (George) Carew character to such prominence in the plot, making him "basically a variation on Oscar Wilde's Lord Henry Wotten (from Wilde's 1890 novel The Picture of Dorian Gray). Both men are sophisticated cads with a cynical point of view, and they both tempt the protagonists to ruin." By making Jekyll into "an easily manipulated pawn", the filmmakers make him "less responsible for his own actions and fate", and more "sympathetic". In her screenplay, Beranger writes of Carew, "Sir George waxes eloquent in his philosophy of Hedonism".
- Another connection to Wilde's The Picture of Dorian Gray is the way Beranger has Hyde devolve into a more inhuman monster as he commits each evil deed. She noted in the script, "Though at first Hyde is misshapen and hideous...he is nothing like the unspeakable, vile-looking creature that he is at the end of the picture. This should be a gradual development of evil" (Hyde's bald head develops a strange point and his overbite becomes much more pronounced as the film proceeds).

== Reception ==
=== Critical reception, 1920 ===
In 1920, film critics in the trade media and in fan-based publications generally gave high marks to Dr. Jekyll and Mr. Hyde and, not surprisingly, focused chiefly on John Barrymore. The popular trade paper Variety described the production as a "fine and dignified presentation" with an "excellent" performance by Barrymore despite what the paper viewed as the absurd nature of the plot:

The story itself is ridiculous, judged by modern standards, but that doesn't alter its value as a medium for Mr. Barrymore...As the handsome young Dr. Jekyll his natural beauty of form and feature stand him in good stead and he offers a marvelous depiction of bestiality in the transformed personality of "Mr. Hyde." Yet he was always Jack Barrymore, which is the most adverse comment that could be made upon the production....

In the weeks following the release of Dr. Jekyll and Mr. Hyde in March 1920, media reports about the box-office receipts being generated by the film and the exorbitant prices being spent by "movie palaces" to rent it attest to the production's commercial success. On April 2, for example, Variety reported that the Rivoli Theatre, a prestigious entertainment venue in New York City, was already earning "enormous takings" from its screenings of the film. Variety also informed its readers that the Rivoli's management had paid $10,000 to the film's distributor just to rent the picture, which it noted was "probably a record price for a straight rental anywhere in the world".

With regard to broader public reaction to Dr. Jekyll and Mr. Hyde in 1920, fan-based publications and individual moviegoers expressed more mixed reactions to the film than critics in entertainment trade papers. Some of those reviewers, like the title characters in the film, were "split", harboring both decidedly positive and negative opinions about the production. Photoplay, a widely read New York-based monthly, provides one example of such mixed reactions. In the magazine's June 1920 issue, critic Burns Mantle describes two of his friends' diametric responses to the picture. One friend praised it as "a perfect sample" of filmmaking, destined to be a "classic" in cinematic history; the other friend was appalled by it. As to his latter friend, Mantle adds that she "insists as strenuously that 'Dr. Jekyll and Mr. Hyde' gave her a most terrific attack of the blues from which she has yet to recover, nor expects to ever fully recover." Mantle's own feelings about the much-anticipated release were not so clear-cut:

My own reaction to this cinemagraphic tour de force strikes somewhere between those two [friends]. I left the picture cold, not to say clammy, but eager to sing the praises of J. Barrymore...by which he reaches the peak of his screen achievements. Eager to also declare it to be the finest bit of directing John Stewart Robertson has ever done...and a job that places him with the first half dozen intelligent directors in the field. But I felt a lot like my other friend who would keep her children away from it and suffer nary a pang of disappointment if I were told I should never look upon its likes again. Frankly I do not care for horrors, either on screen or stage.

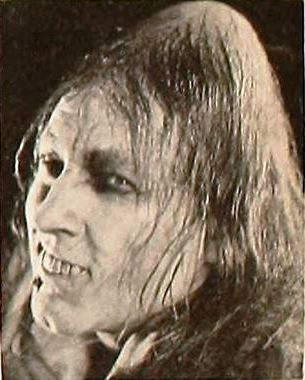
Barrymore in full makeup as the "ghastly" and evil Mr. Hyde. At this point in the film Hyde's transformations are so extreme that they are out of control. Jekyll soon realizes this.

Frederick James Smith, the "Celluloid Critic" for Motion Picture Classic, another major fan publication, considered Dr. Jekyll and Mr. Hyde "a finely workmanlike piece of screencraft". He did, though, caution his readers about Barrymore's appearance as Jekyll's inner beast. "His Hyde", Smith observed, "is a terrible being, with the most ghastly make-up we recall ever seeing in the films." In fact, audience exposure to Barrymore's Hyde became a point of concern expressed in some reviews, with his screen presence threatening the mental and even physical health of the public, especially for children exposed to the actor's "ghoulish" character and the film’s possible "pre-natal influences" on expectant mothers.

Whatever reservations or warnings that film critics may have expressed about Dr. Jekyll and Mr. Hyde, they did not deter throngs of moviegoers in 1920 from seeing what Photoplay predicted would "easily become the most talked of picture of the time." The magazine illustrated that popularity when it reported, "A door and two windows were broken by the crowds that tried to see it on its first showing in New York".

=== More recent assessments ===
In 2014, American film critic and historian Leonard Maltin gave this version of Dr. Jekyll and Mr. Hyde three stars on a four-star rating scale. Maltin also complimented Barrymore's performances as both Jekyll and Hyde, as well as the film's overall production, describing it as "well made".

As of 2020, the film has an approval rating of 92% based on 13 reviews, with an average rating of 7.75/10, on review aggregator website Rotten Tomatoes.

=== Accolades ===
The film is recognized by American Film Institute in these lists:

- 2001: AFI's 100 Years...100 Thrills – Nominated
- 2003: AFI's 100 Years...100 Heroes & Villains:
  - Dr. Jekyll – Nominated Hero

=== Home media ===
It was first released on VHS by Thorn EMI Video in June 1982. Years later, it was released to DVD by Kino on Video on October 9, 2001.

== See also ==
- List of American films of 1920
- The House That Shadows Built (1931 promotional film by Paramount)
- John Barrymore on stage, screen and radio
