= Dr. Jekyll and Mr. Hyde (1912 film) =

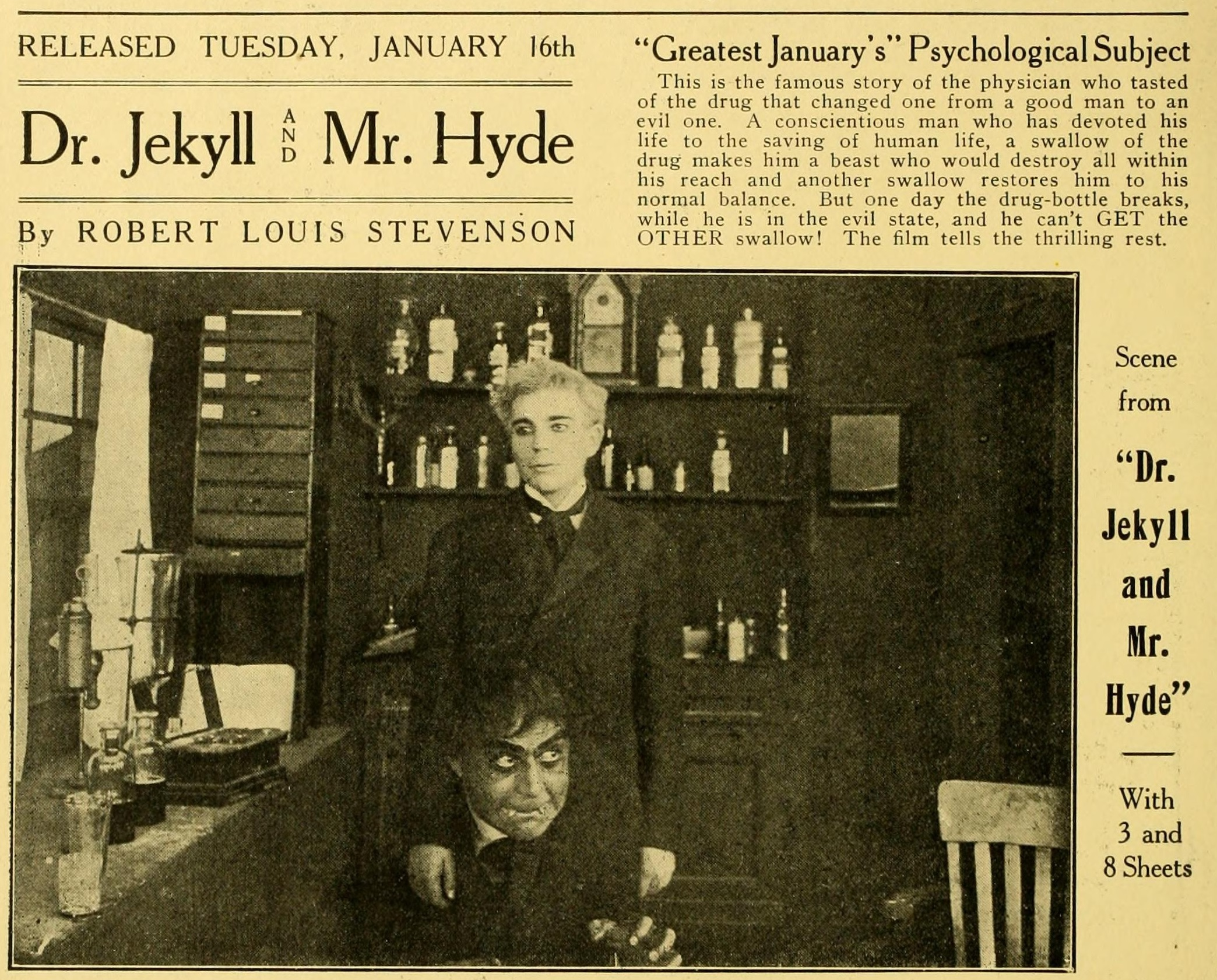
- Ad for the movie
- Directed by: Lucius J. Henderson
- Written by: Robert Louis Stevenson (novel); Thomas Sullivan (screenplay)
- Based on: Strange Case of Dr. Jekyll and Mr. Hyde; 1886 novella by Robert Louis Stevenson
- Produced by: Edwin Thanhouser
- Starring: James Cruze; Florence La Badie
- Release date: January 16, 1912
- Running time: 11 minutes (one-reel film)
- Country: United States
- Languages: Silent film English

Dr. Jekyll and Mr. Hyde (1912)

Dr. Jekyll and Mr. Hyde is a 1912 horror film based on both Robert Louis Stevenson's novella Strange Case of Dr Jekyll and Mr Hyde (1886) and on the 1887 play version written by Thomas Russell Sullivan. Directed by Lucius Henderson, the film stars actor (later noted film director) James Cruze in the dual role of Dr. Jekyll and Mr. Hyde, and co-starred his real life wife Marguerite Snow as well.

== Plot ==
White-haired Dr. Jekyll has secretly locked himself in his laboratory, administering himself with a vial of formula. He slumps into his chair with his head on his chest. As the drug slowly takes effect, a dark-haired, taloned beast with two large fangs now appears in the chair. After repeated use, Jekyll's evil alter ego emerges at will, causing Jekyll to knock a little girl down in the street and even to murder his sweetheart's father (the local minister). The evil personality scuttles back to the laboratory only to discover that the antidote is finished and that he will have to remain as Mr. Hyde forever. A burly policeman breaks down Jekyll's door with an ax to find the kindly doctor dead from drinking poison.

== Cast ==
- James Cruze as Dr. Jekyll/Mr. Hyde
- Florence La Badie as Jekyll's sweetheart
- Marie Eline as Little girl knocked down by Hyde
- Jane Gail (extra)
- Marguerite Snow (extra)
- Harry Benham as Mr. Hyde (in some scenes, uncredited)

== Production ==
This film was produced by the Thanhouser Company. Rather than adapt the 1886 novel as earlier film adaptations had done, Thanhouser decided to more closely follow the 1887 stage play, telescoping its events down into a 12-minute-long film. Cruze plays Jekyll as a white-haired, middle-aged, well meaning doctor, but "upon his transformation into Hyde, he cuts loose and delivers a memorable bit of pantomime acting....as he morphs into an impish and violent sociopath". Jekyll's girlfriend's father becomes a minister in this version rather than the pompous aristocrat of the novel.

Some sources list Harry Benham as the actor who played Mr. Hyde in the film , but in an interview in the October 1963 issue of Famous Monsters of Filmland, Harry Benham revealed that while Cruze played both Jekyll and Hyde, he and Cruze shared the role of Hyde, with Benham doubling for Cruze as Hyde in some scenes (uncredited). Historian Steve Haberman stated that Benham played Mr. Hyde in all of the Hyde scenes, since Hyde was noticeably shorter than Cruze in all of the transformation scenes. He said "in fact, he is not even tall enough to see himself in the good doctor's mirror hanging on the wall..."

== Critiques ==
Critic Troy Howarth felt the Hyde makeup was crude yet effective, although he felt Jekyll's laboratory set looked like a cheap closet. He said Hyde's "reign of terror" is confined to a couple of brief scenes of violence, and that Hyde acts more "like an unrestrained child who is allowed to run amok by a distracted parent...than a genuine menace".
