= Harry Gwynette =

English stage actor

- Born: c. 1836; Granada
- Died: 24 September 1913 (aged 76); New York City
- Occupation: stage actor

Harry Gwynette (c. 1836 – 24 September 1913) was a British stage actor. Gwynette's father was a surgeon who wanted him to become a doctor also. Gwynette decided on acting instead and moved to Australia, traveling by clipper from Southampton to Melbourne. He later returned to England, where he acted for Charles Kean at the Princess Theatre in London. He subsequently joined the burlesque company of Lydia Thompson and traveled with her to the United States in 1868. In later years he joined the company of Richard Mansfield.

He died at the age of 76 on 24 September 1913 at Bellevue Hospital in New York City.
