= Beatrice Cameron =

American actress

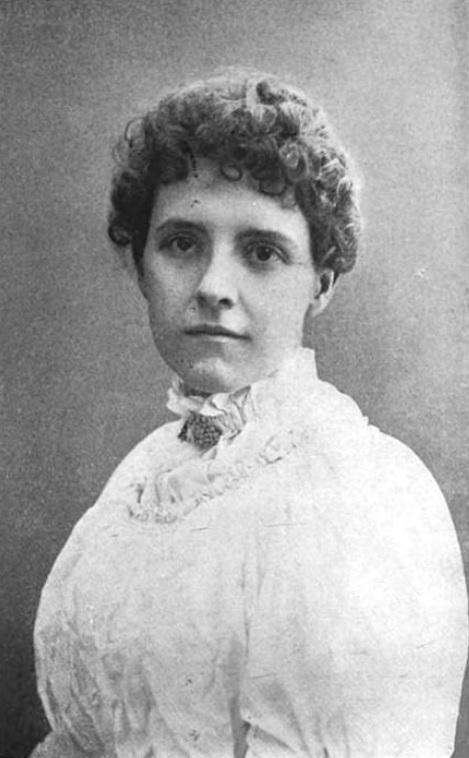
- Born: Susan Hegeman; 1868; Troy, New York, United States
- Died: July 12, 1940 (aged 72); New London, Connecticut, United States
- Occupation: Actress
- Years active: 1886–1898
- Spouse: Richard Mansfield (1892–1907)

Beatrice Cameron (born Susan Hegeman, 1868 – July 12, 1940) was an American stage actress. She was the leading lady for the company of actor Richard Mansfield, whom she married in 1892. She retired from acting in 1898.

== Career ==
Cameron's first acting experience was in The Midnight Marriage with Cora Urquhart Brown-Potter at the Madison Square Theatre on Broadway. She was a spectator at a rehearsal when a member of the cast in a minor role fell ill. She volunteered to take over the part, learning both lines and dance steps by the following evening. After performing with the company of Robert B. Mantell, in 1886 she joined the company of Richard Mansfield. Her first role with the company was in the comedy Prince Karl. In 1887 she took the part of Agnes Carew in the Broadway production of Dr. Jekyll and Mr. Hyde, a role that she would reprise in London and many other cities. While in London, she first appeared in Lesbia and Richard III. Upon returning to the United States, she became the first actress to portray Nora in A Doll's House on Broadway, when Henrik Ibsen's controversial play opened at Palmer's Theatre in December 1889. Cameron performed in 13 other plays with Mansfield's company.

She officially retired from acting on February 12, 1898, following a performance at the Grand Opera House in Chicago. She did appear once post-retirement, in a final performance as Raina in George Bernard Shaw's play Arms and the Man, at the Garden Theatre on January 8, 1900.

== Personal life ==
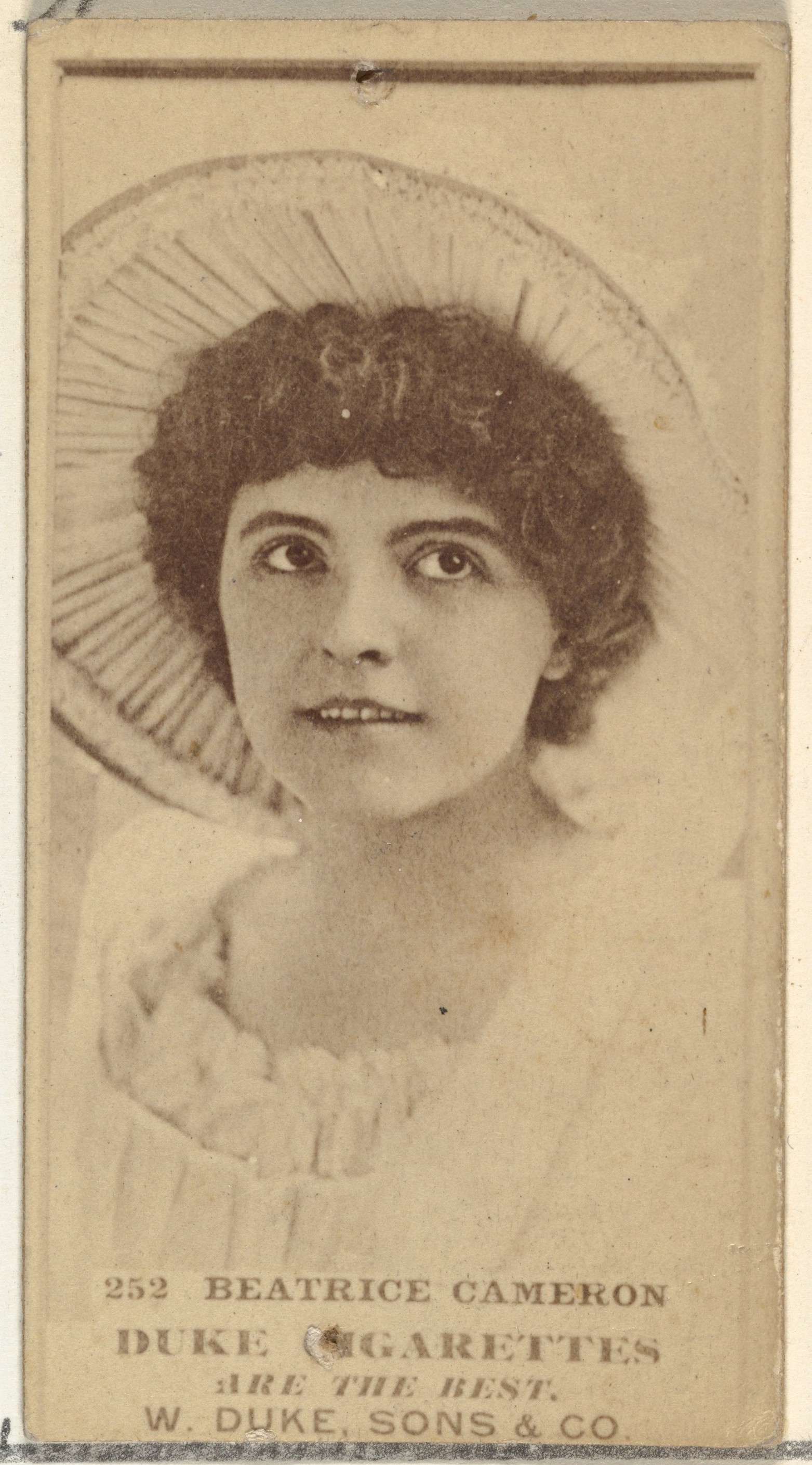
Beatrice Cameron, from the Actors and Actresses series (N145-7) issued by Duke Sons & Co., 1880s, Metropolitan Museum of Art

Cameron was born Susan Hegeman in Troy, New York in 1868. She was the daughter of William H. and Esther Byram Hegeman. She married Mansfield on September 15, 1892. She continued to perform with him in their touring company. While traveling to a show in Milwaukee, Wisconsin in February 1895, Cameron and a maid were injured when an out of control passenger coach crashed into their private rail car. The evening's performance was cancelled, but both women escaped with only minor injuries.

Their only child, George Gibbs Mansfield, was born on August 8, 1898. Gibbs Mansfield would later adopt his father's first name when he followed him into acting. The elder Richard Mansfield died on August 30, 1907. When the United States entered World War I, their son enlisted in the army. He died of meningitis on April 3, 1918, while training with the Signal Corps in San Antonio, Texas.

In 1920, Cameron engaged in relief work for victims of the Armenian genocide in Urfa, Turkey, when the American humanitarian compounds housing Armenian orphans came under siege. There she came under Turkish fire. Soon afterwards, she did relief work with the refugees in Jerusalem. She recited Shakespeare to the suffering and hungry refugees. She subsequently participated in relief efforts in Syria and Czechoslovakia, supported women's suffrage and was active in the League of Women Voters.

Cameron donated her late husband's costumes to the Smithsonian Institution and the Carnegie Institute of Technology. She donated to Episcopal churches, including the Church of the Transfiguration in New York, in his honor. In 1925 she organized a theater company, the Richard Mansfield Players, and in 1932 she staged a revival of Arms and the Man in his memory. She lived in their home in New London, Connecticut until her own death due to coronary thrombosis on July 12, 1940.
