= Dr. Jekyll and Mr. Hyde (1941 film) =

1941 American horror film directed by Victor Fleming

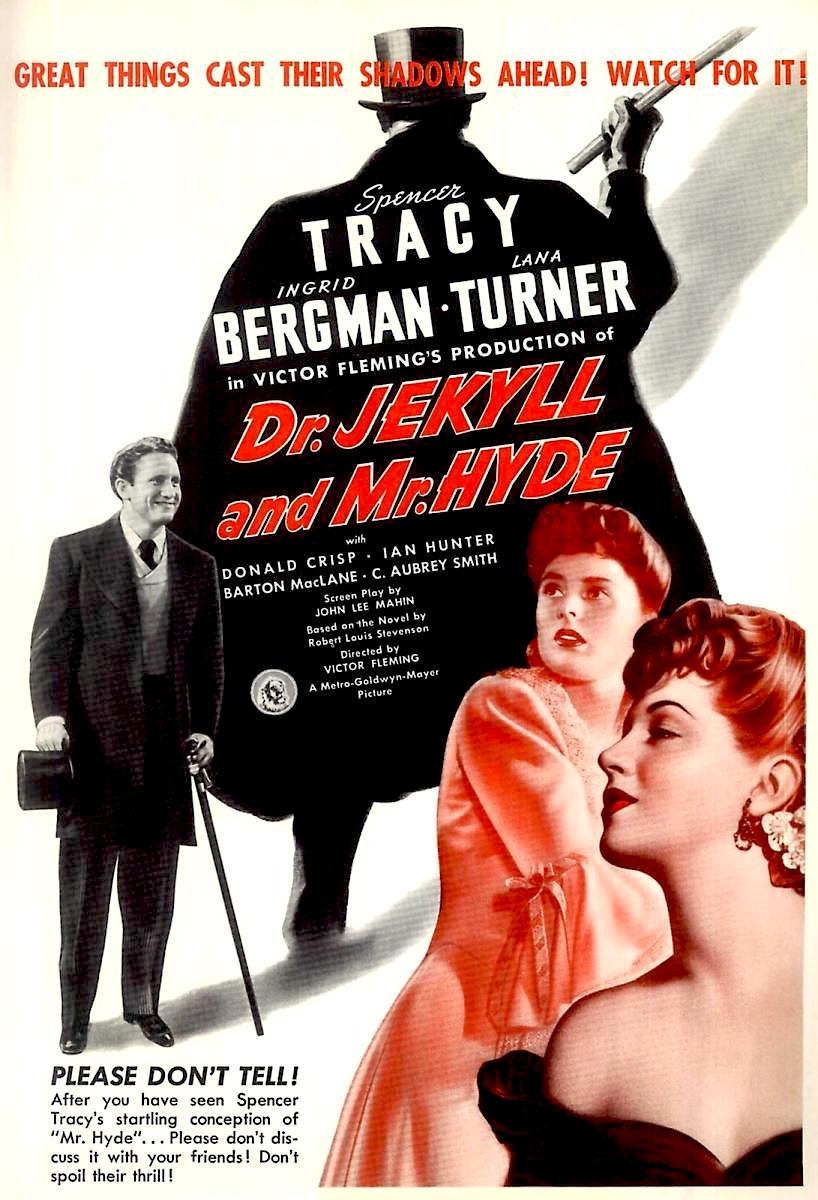
- Theatrical release poster
- Directed by: Victor Fleming
- Written by: John Lee Mahin; Percy Heath; Samuel Hoffenstein
- Based on: Strange Case of Dr. Jekyll and Mr. Hyde; 1886 novella by Robert Louis Stevenson
- Produced by: Victor Saville
- Starring: Spencer Tracy; Ingrid Bergman; Lana Turner; Donald Crisp
- Cinematography: Joseph Ruttenberg
- Edited by: Harold F. Kress
- Music by: Franz Waxman
- Production company: Metro-Goldwyn-Mayer
- Distributed by: Loew's, Inc.
- Release date: August 12, 1941
- Running time: 113 minutes
- Country: United States
- Language: English
- Budget: $1.1 million
- Box office: $2.3 million

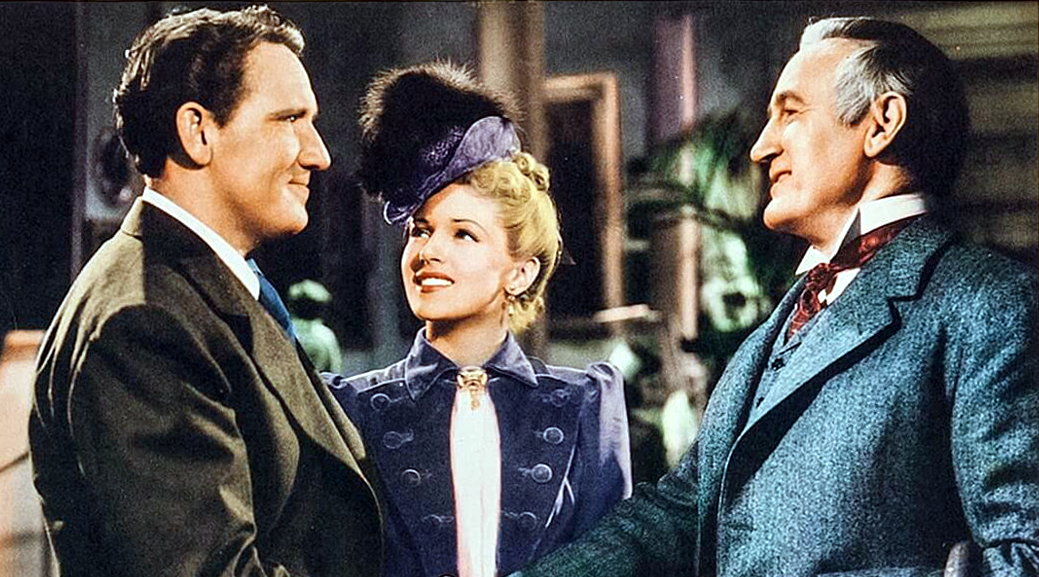
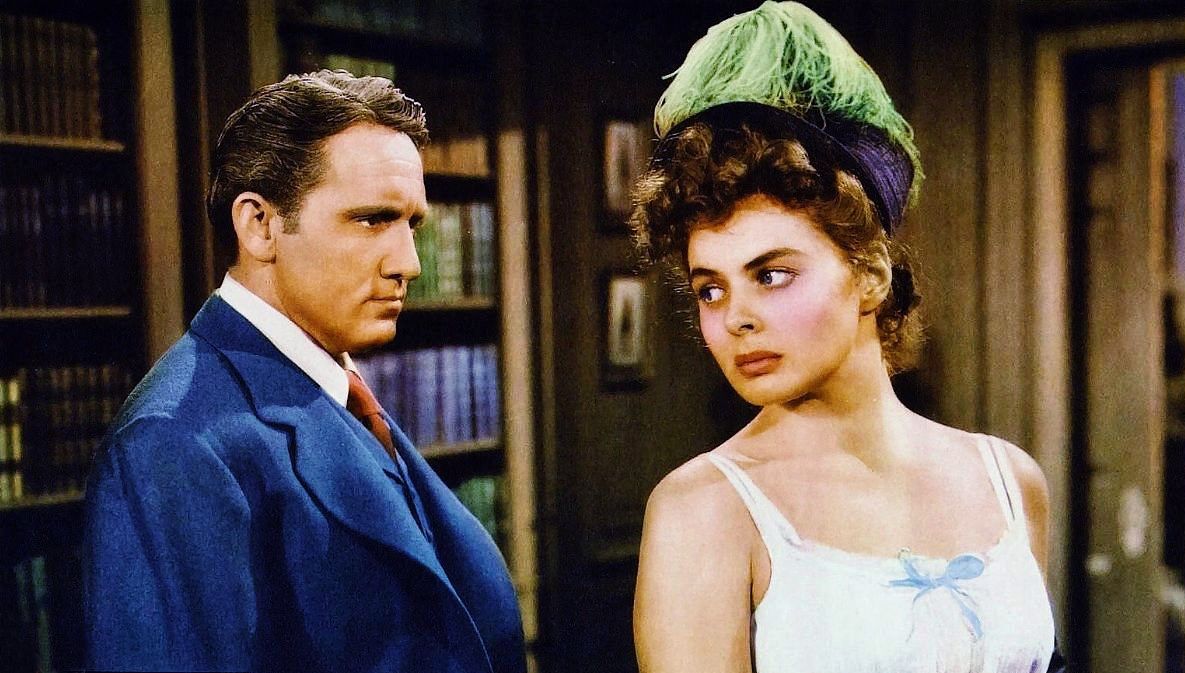
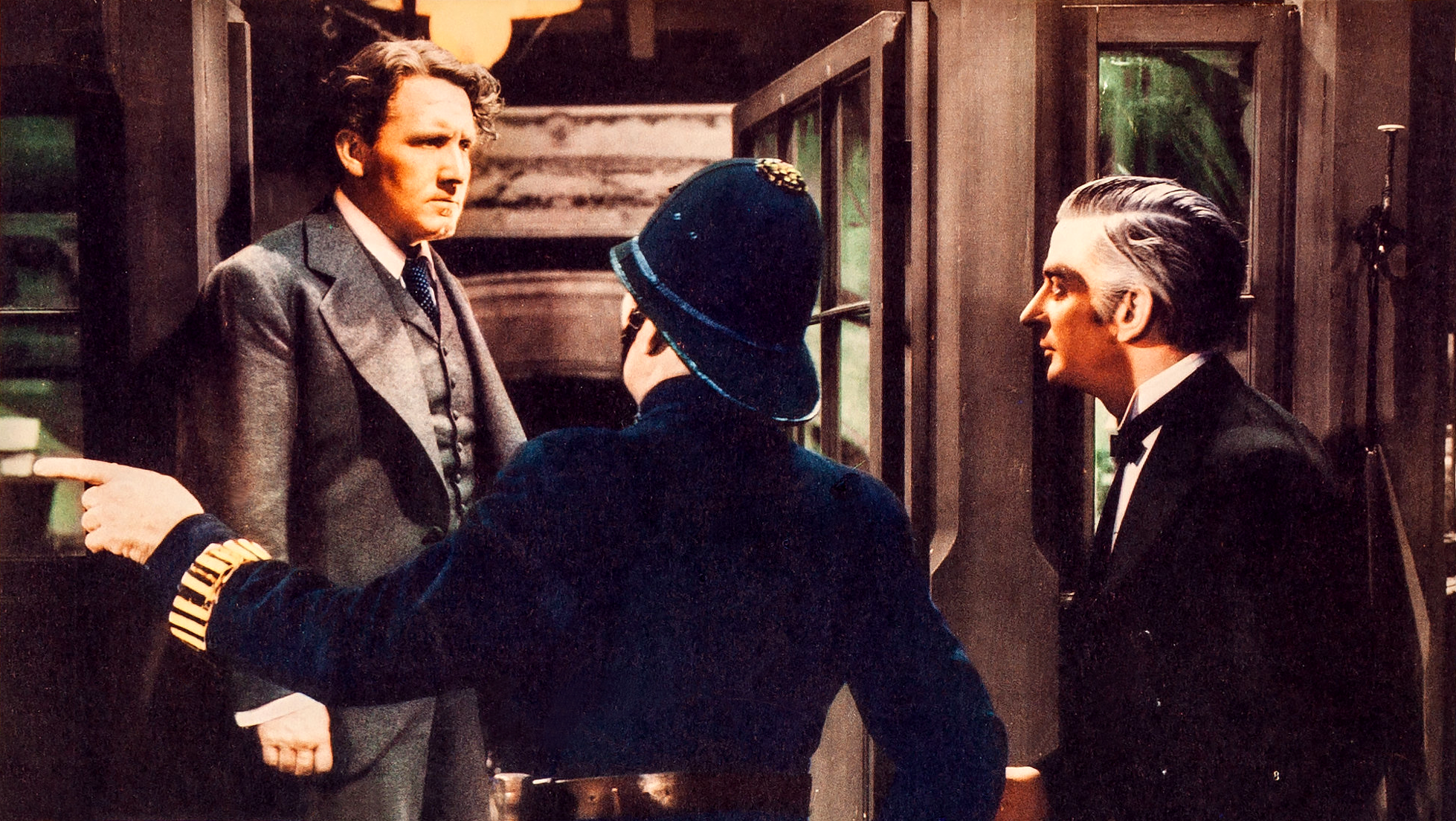
Colorized publicity shots featuring Spencer Tracy, Lana Turner, Donald Crisp, Ingrid Bergman and Peter Godfrey.

Dr. Jekyll and Mr. Hyde is a 1941 American horror film starring Spencer Tracy, Ingrid Bergman, and Lana Turner. The production also features Donald Crisp, Ian Hunter, Barton MacLane, C. Aubrey Smith, and Sara Allgood. Its storyline is based on the 1886 Gothic novella Strange Case of Dr Jekyll and Mr Hyde written by Scottish author Robert Louis Stevenson. There have been many filmed adaptations of the novella. This movie was a remake of the Oscar-winning 1931 version starring Fredric March.

Released in August 1941, Dr. Jekyll and Mr. Hyde was a commercial success, and was nominated for three Academy Awards.

== Plot ==
In 1887 London, Dr. Henry Jekyll performs research experiments on the possibility of separating the good and evil aspects of human nature. Jekyll is in love with Beatrix Emery, but her father, Sir Charles, is skeptical of Jekyll's radical ideas. Unable to experiment on others, Jekyll develops a serum, takes it, and is transformed in mindset and countenance into an alter ego. Jekyll takes an antidote to reverse the serum's effects, but not before hallucinating a voice that says: "Mr. Hyde".

Beatrix departs England on a trip abroad with her father, who is concerned about her love affair. When Beatrix's father extends their time away from London, Jekyll continues to experiment with the serum, ingesting another dose. As Mr. Hyde, he ventures into a music hall and spots barmaid Ivy Peterson, whom he saved from an attacker in the streets weeks before. Because his face and manner is disfigured by the serum, Ivy does not recognize him, and becomes frightened when approaching his table. Hyde instigates mayhem in the music hall, tripping one man, hitting another with a cane, poking another in the eye, pitting one patron against another until a brawl ensues. Hyde convinces the owner that Ivy was the cause of the trouble, and bribes him to fire her. Hyde takes a reluctant Ivy home with him, and rapes her in the carriage.

While Beatrix grows concerned after receiving no correspondence, Hyde provides Ivy housing in a flat, although she lives in fear of Hyde's controlling and violent behavior. Her friend Marcia eventually visits her, sees bruises on Ivy's back and suspects Ivy is being abused. However, before she can find out what is going on, Hyde appears and menaces Marcia, who leaves; afterward, Hyde taunts Ivy that Marcia is more beautiful than Ivy, and he may leave Ivy to pursue Marcia, before forcing Ivy to sing and raping her.

Upon learning that Beatrix has returned to England, Jekyll vows not to take the serum again. He sends Ivy an anonymous gift of money before destroying the key to the street entrance of his laboratory, the entrance that he uses while under the influence of Hyde. Later, Ivy visits Jekyll as a patient, and recognizes him as the man who helped her in the street. She shows him her injuries, and he realizes what Hyde has done to her.

Later that night, as Jekyll ventures to meet Beatrix, who has returned to England, he transforms into Hyde without having ingested the serum. Hyde ventures to Ivy's flat and finds her drunk and celebrating her freedom from him. When Hyde repeats phrases that Jekyll spoke to her, she grows terrified and begins screaming, resulting in Hyde strangling her to death. Hyde flees to the laboratory, but cannot enter as Jekyll destroyed the key; instead, Hyde visits Dr. John Lanyon, a friend of Jekyll. Lanyon provides him the medication that works as the antidote, and Hyde reverts to Jekyll.

Jekyll confesses to a horrified Lanyon everything that transpired, and proceeds to visit Beatrix to end their engagement. Distraught by the incident, Beatrix is horrified when Jekyll returns transformed as Hyde. Beatrix screams before losing consciousness. Her father, roused by Beatrix's scream, enters the room, only to be bludgeoned to death by Hyde with Jekyll's cane. Hyde flees back to the laboratory, and, unable to enter through the street door, pushes past Jekyll's butler, Poole. Meanwhile, as police investigate Sir Charles's body, Lanyon arrives, observes that Jekyll's cane was the murder weapon and realizes what happened. In the laboratory, Jekyll reverts to normal and checks himself in the mirror but sees Hyde's reflection taunting him. Lanyon and the authorities arrive at Jekyll's home moments after Hyde has ingested the antidote and turned back into Jekyll. They confront him about Sir Charles's murder. The psychological stress of the situation triggers Jekyll into returning back into Hyde, and he becomes violent. While attempting to fight police, Hyde is shot by Lanyon. As he dies, his demeanor and countenance morphs back into that of Jekyll.

Poole kneels and prays: “The Lord is my Shepherd…” The words “He restoreth my soul” are taken up and repeated by a chorus.

== Cast ==
- Spencer Tracy as Dr. Henry Jekyll / Mr. Edward Hyde
- Ingrid Bergman as Ivy Pearson
- Lana Turner as Beatrix Emery
- Donald Crisp as Sir Charles Emery
- Ian Hunter as John Lanyon
- Barton MacLane as Sam Higgins
- C. Aubrey Smith as Bishop Manners
- Peter Godfrey as Poole, Jekyll's butler
- Sara Allgood as Mrs. Higgins
- Frederic Worlock as Dr. Heath
- William Tannen as Intern Fenwick
- Frances Robinson as Marcia
- Denis Green as Freddie
- Billy Bevan as Mr. Weller
- Forrester Harvey as Old Prouty
- Lumsden Hare as Colonel Weymouth
- Lawrence Grant as Dr. Courtland
- John Barclay as Constable at Church
- Colin Kenny as Constable
- Lydia Bilbrook Lady Copewell
- Alec Craig as Waiter
- Mary Field as Wife

== Analysis ==
Scholar Angela Smith writes that the film does not depict a significant physical difference between Jekyll and Hyde, suggesting that, unlike in other iterations of the story, the film places "greater emphasis on the psychological and neurological elements of physical disorders and testifies to the unreliability of the bodily exterior as a sign of health or degeneracy." She further cites that the hallucinatory sequences in the film featuring both Ivy and Beatrix (which occur when Jekyll ingests the serum) "conflate epileptic and sexual release, pointing to repressed sexual desires as the source of individual malaise." Smith summarizes that the film's treatment of the source material "suggests the complex network of physiology, neurology, psychology, sexuality, and environment that is shaped in the relationship between impairment and medicine."

== Production ==
=== Development ===
Rather than being a new film version of Robert Louis Stevenson's novella, this Dr. Jekyll and Mr. Hyde is a direct remake of the 1931 film of the same title. Both Hollywood productions differ greatly from the original literary work due to their heavy reliance on Thomas Russell Sullivan's 1887 stage adaptation of the story. The director for the 1941 film was Victor Fleming, who had directed Gone with the Wind and The Wizard of Oz, two major releases by Metro-Goldwyn-Mayer in 1939. MGM, where Fleming was under contract, acquired full rights to the 1931 film from Paramount Pictures prior to Fleming's production. According to the Robert Louis Stevenson website being archived and preserved by the British Library, subsequent to that acquisition MGM studio executives “hid the [1931] film away to avoid competition with their remake”. The Oscar-winning 1931 version then, due to ongoing legal restrictions and the lack of readily available copies, was effectively “lost” for over a quarter of a century, not generally available again for re-screenings and study until 1967.

MGM's 1941 remake was produced by Victor Saville and adapted by John Lee Mahin from the screenplay of the earlier film by Percy Heath and Samuel Hoffenstein. The score was composed by Franz Waxman with uncredited contributions by Daniele Amfitheatrof and Mario Castelnuovo-Tedesco. The cinematographer was Joseph Ruttenberg, the art director was Cedric Gibbons, and the costume designers were Adrian and Gile Steele. Jack Dawn created the make-up for the dissolute Mr. Hyde's appearance.

The PCA was very specific in characterizing Ivy as a barmaid rather than a prostitute, as she is characterized in the source material.

Although a remake, the final moments of this film differ significantly from the 1931 version. In that film, Fredric March does revert to the appearance of Jekyll, but Poole does not speak. The only sound is from a boiling cauldron, and the camera pans away from Jekyll's face to the source of that sound, surrounded by flames.

=== Casting ===
Despite having not yet met his later co-star Katharine Hepburn (they met working on Woman of the Year in 1942), Tracy originally wanted her to play both Bergman's and Turner's roles as the "bad" and "good" woman, who would then turn out to be the same person.

Initial casting had Bergman playing the virtuous fiancée of Jekyll and Turner as Ivy. However, Bergman, tired of playing saintly characters and fearing typecasting, pleaded with Victor Fleming that she and Turner switch roles. After a screen test, Fleming allowed Bergman to play a grittier role for the first time.

== Release ==
=== Box office ===
According to MGM records the film earned $2,351,000 resulting in a profit of $350,000.

=== Critical reception ===
The August 14, 1941 New York Times review—bylined T.S.—warned readers that a pan was coming: “ Let's be gentle and begin by admitting that the new film version of "Dr. Jekyll and Mr. Hyde" has a point or two in its favor. .. Ingrid Bergman...proves again that a shining talent can sometimes lift itself above an impossibly written role. There is also at least one superbly photographed chase of the maddened Hyde running amok through the fog-bound London streets, his cape billowing behind him like a vision of terror. The film has, finally, the extraordinarily polished production that only Hollywood's technical wizards can achieve.” Beyond that, he found it to be a “preposterous mixture of hokum and high-flown psychological balderdash…a Grand Guignol chiller with delusions of grandeur,… In a daring montage or two, which must have caught the censors dozing, a weary Freud is dragged in by the coat-tails…A little Freudian theory is a dangerous thing. It can make a piece of errant hokum dizzy with significance. Faced with the choice of creating hokum unabashed or a psychological study of a man caught in mortal conflict with himself, the producers have tried to do both—and failed by nearly two hours of pompous symbolism. As a result there were a good many giggles in the house—and at the wrong places—when Spencer Tracy, … gradually assumed the shape of the bestial Mr. Hyde. … Mr. Tracy's portrait of Hyde is not so much evil incarnate as it is the ham rampant.… an affront to good taste rather than a serious, and thereby acceptable, study in sadism. Of all the actors, only Miss Bergman has emerged with some measure of honor… But the fault lies deeper than the performances. Out of ham and hokum the adaptors have tried to create a study of a man caught at bay by the devil he has released within himself. And it doesn't come off either as hokum, significant drama or entertainment.”

After its preview of Dr. Jekyll and Mr. Hyde in late July 1941, the trade paper Variety cited some weaknesses in the development of characters and situations in the film's plot; but, overall, the popular New York publication gave the production a very positive assessment. Variety predicted the film would be “one of the big ones for fall release” and focused special attention on Bergman's performance and screen presence. It compared too Hyde's physical appearance with his portrayals in the 1920 and 1931 interpretations of Stevenson's novella:

...Tracy plays the dual roles with conviction. His transformations from the young physician...to the demonic Mr. Hyde are brought about with considerably less alterations in face and stature than audiences might expect, remembering John Barrymore and Fredric March in earlier versions. What is likely to happen when the new “Jekyll” moves into general distribution after Sept. 1, is more generous recognition of Ingrid Bergman as a screen actress of exceptional ability....In every scene in which the two appear, she is Tracy’s equal as a strong screen personality.

The Film Daily praised the film in its review, heaping most of its accolades on Victor Fleming and his direction. The trade paper, which was widely read by theater owners or “exhibitors”, complimented Fleming's pacing and staging of the story and described his “handling of the players” as “flawless”.

Outside the realm of film-industry trade papers, the general public in 1941 had more mixed reviews about Dr. Jekyll and Mr. Hyde. One example of those reactions can be found in the contemporary fan magazine Hollywood, which was distributed nationally each month by Fawcett Publications in Louisville, Kentucky. Hollywood recommended that its readership “should see the picture”, citing once again Bergman's excellent, “breath-taking” portrayal of Ivy. The monthly did, though, find the film's plot passé and Tracy's Hyde far too understated in appearance to be effective:

In the ten years that have elapsed since Fredric March won his Academy Award for his work in the title roles, movie-goers have become too sophisticated for the sort of medical hocus-pocus on which the Stevenson story is based. Too many Frankensteins and bogey-men have stalked across the screen in the interim for Mr. Hyde to be a convincing monster. While Spencer Tracy does a grand job in his dual role, his Mr. Hyde is inclined to be more humorous than terrifying.

Another fan-based publication, Modern Screen, was less subtle in its November 1941 review of Dr. Jekyll and Mr. Hyde, calling the film “quite the oddest picture of the year”. The magazine, in part, considered the remake “funniest when apparently it is trying to be most serious and never so routine as when it is trying hardest to be different.”

With regard to more recent critical responses to this version of Dr. Jekyll and Mr. Hyde, American film reviewer and historian Leonard Maltin in 2014 gave the production 3 out of a possible 4 stars, praising in particular Tracy and Bergman's performances. The online film-review aggregator Rotten Tomatoes reported, as of 2023, an approval rating of 60% among professional critics, a score based on 25 reviews, with a rating average of 6.7/10, with the critical consensus reading "Despite its powerful cast, Stevenson's classic story loses its social and sexual undertones in this lustless, but still decently entertaining, adaptation."

== Home media ==
Warner Bros. released 1941 version on DVD in May 22, 2018 and Blu-ray in May 17, 2022.

== Awards and honors ==
Institution	Category	Recipient	Result	Ref.
Academy Awards	Best Cinematography (Black and white)	Joseph Ruttenberg	Nominated	
Academy Awards	Best Film Editing	Harold F. Kress	Nominated	
Academy Awards	Best Music, Scoring	Franz Waxman	Nominated	

- In 2005, the film was nominated by the American Film Institute to “AFI's 100 Years of Film Scores”.

== Sources ==
- Bloom, Abigail (2014). The Literary Monster on Film: Five Nineteenth Century British Novels and Their Cinematic Adaptations. Jefferson, North Carolina: McFarland. ISBN 978-0-786-45759-5.
- Maltin, Leonard; Sader, Luke; Carson, Darwyn (2013). Leonard Maltin's 2014 Movie Guide. New York: Penguin. ISBN 978-0-451-41810-4.
- Smith, Angela (2012). Hideous Progeny: Disability, Eugenics, and Classic Horror Cinema. New York: Columbia University Press. ISBN 978-0-231-52785-9.
- Vieira, Mark A. (2003). Hollywood Horror: From Gothic to Cosmic. New York: Harry N. Abrams, Inc. ISBN 0-8109-4535-5.
