= Richard Mansfield =

English actor-manager (1857–1907)

Richard Mansfield

Richard Mansfield (24 May 1857 – 30 August 1907) was a German-born English actor-manager best known for his performances in Shakespeare plays, Gilbert and Sullivan operas, and the play Dr. Jekyll and Mr. Hyde; his performances in the last made such an impression that he was accused of being Jack the Ripper.

== Life and career ==
Mansfield was born in Berlin and spent his early childhood on Heligoland (now in Germany), an archipelago in the North Sea, then under British rule. His parents were Hermine Küchenmeister-Rudersdorf, a Russian-born operatic soprano, and Maurice Mansfield, a British London-based wine merchant (died 1861). His grandfather was the violinist Joseph Rudersdorff. Mansfield was educated at Derby School, in Derby, England, and studied painting in London. His mother took him to America, where she was performing, but he returned to England at age 20. Finding that he could not make a living as a painter, he gained some success as a drawing-room entertainer, eventually moving into acting.

=== Early career, D'Oyly Carte and first London successes ===
Mansfield in the dual roles of Dr. Jekyll and Mr. Hyde

He first appeared on the stage at St. George's Hall, London, in the German Reed Entertainments and then turned to light opera, joining Richard D'Oyly Carte's Comedy Opera Company in 1879 to appear as Sir Joseph Porter in H.M.S. Pinafore on tour. He continued to play the Gilbert and Sullivan comic "patter" roles on tour in Britain until 1881. Mansfield created the role of Major General Stanley in the single copyright performance of The Pirates of Penzance in Paignton, England, in 1879. In addition to Sir Joseph and the Major General, in 1880 he also began to play John Wellington Wells in The Sorcerer.

He left the D'Oyly Carte company in 1881, returned to London, and soon made his London debut in Jacques Offenbach's La boulangère. He played several further roles in London and then travelled to America in 1882, where he made his Broadway debut as Dromez in Bucalossis' Les Manteaux Noirs with a D'Oyly Carte touring company. He then played the roles of Nick Vedder and Jan Vedder in another D'Oyly Carte production, Robert Planquette's Rip Van Winkle (1882).

Mansfield then appeared in Baltimore, Maryland, with another D'Oyly Carte troupe, as the Lord Chancellor in Gilbert and Sullivan's Iolanthe in December 1882. He suffered a bad ankle sprain only two days later, however, and left the production, returning to New York. In 1883 he joined A. M. Palmer's Union Square theatre company in New York, and made a hit as Baron Chevrial in A Parisian Romance. Mansfield's portrayal of Chevrial, a "realistic exhibition of depravity in dotage, by a young and comparatively unknown actor, was a surprise to the public, the managers, and the critics, and soon became a town topic." He next played the role of Ko-Ko, the Lord High Executioner in The Mikado, in Boston in early 1886, his last production with a D'Oyly Carte cast.

He appeared successfully in an original play, Prince Karl, and in several plays adapted from well-known stories, and his 1887 rendering of the title-characters in Thomas Russell Sullivan's Dr. Jekyll and Mr. Hyde for Palmer's company at Madison Square Theatre, only a year after publication of Robert Louis Stevenson's novella, created a profound impression. It was with this play that he made his London reputation during the 1888 season at the Lyceum Theatre, by invitation of Henry Irving. He also reprised the role in Broadway revivals.

=== Actor-producer ===
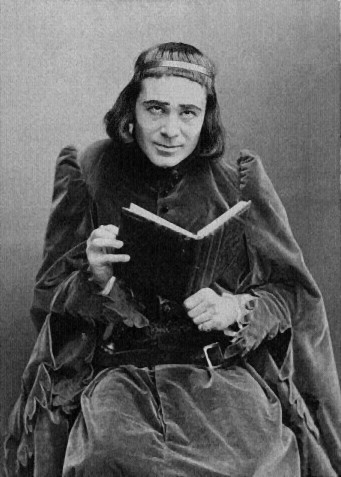
Mansfield as English king Richard III, c. 1889

Mansfield continued his acting career but had also begun a career as a theatrical manager in America in 1886. He produced the play Richard III in 1889 at the Globe Theatre. He was back on Broadway in 1890 in Beau Brummell (he reprised this role several times). He was one of the earliest to produce George Bernard Shaw's plays in America, appearing in 1894 as Bluntschli in Arms and the Man, and as Dick Dudgeon in The Devil's Disciple in 1897. The latter production was the first Shaw production to turn a profit. As a manager and producer of plays, Mansfield was known for his lavish staging. He often produced, starred in (often opposite his wife), and directed plays on Broadway, sometimes also writing under the pseudonym Meridan Phelps. His other Broadway roles in the 1890s included Napoleon Bonaparte (1894), the title role in The Story of Rodion, the Student (1895), Sir John Sombras in Castle Sombras (1896), Eugen Courvoisier in The First Violin (1898 and 1988), the title role in Cyrano de Bergerac (1898 and 1899).

He began the new century on Broadway in the title role in King Henry V (1900), followed by the title character in Monsieur Beaucaire, Brutus in Julius Caesar (1902), Karl Heinrich in Old Heidelberg (1903 and 1904), and roles in Ivan the Terrible (1904), A Parisian Romance (1904 and 1905), The Merchant of Venice (1905), Richard III (1905), Alceste in The Misanthrope (1905), The Scarlet Letter (1906) and Don Carlos (1906), among others. He continued to perform until his final year. One of his last performances, just a few months before his death, was the title role in a Broadway production of Henrik Ibsen's Peer Gynt, the play's U.S. premiere.

Mansfield's popularity as a Shakespearean actor was immense. Upon his death, The New York Times stated: "As an interpreter of Shakespeare, he had no living equal in his later days, as witnessed by the princely grace, the tragic force of his Richard, his thrilling acting in the tent scene of "Caesar", the soldierly dignity and eloquence of his Prince Hal, and the pathos of the prayer in that play. He was the greatest actor of his hour, and one of the greatest of all times."

Mansfield died in New London, Connecticut, in 1907 at age 50, from liver cancer.

=== Suspected in Jack the Ripper case ===
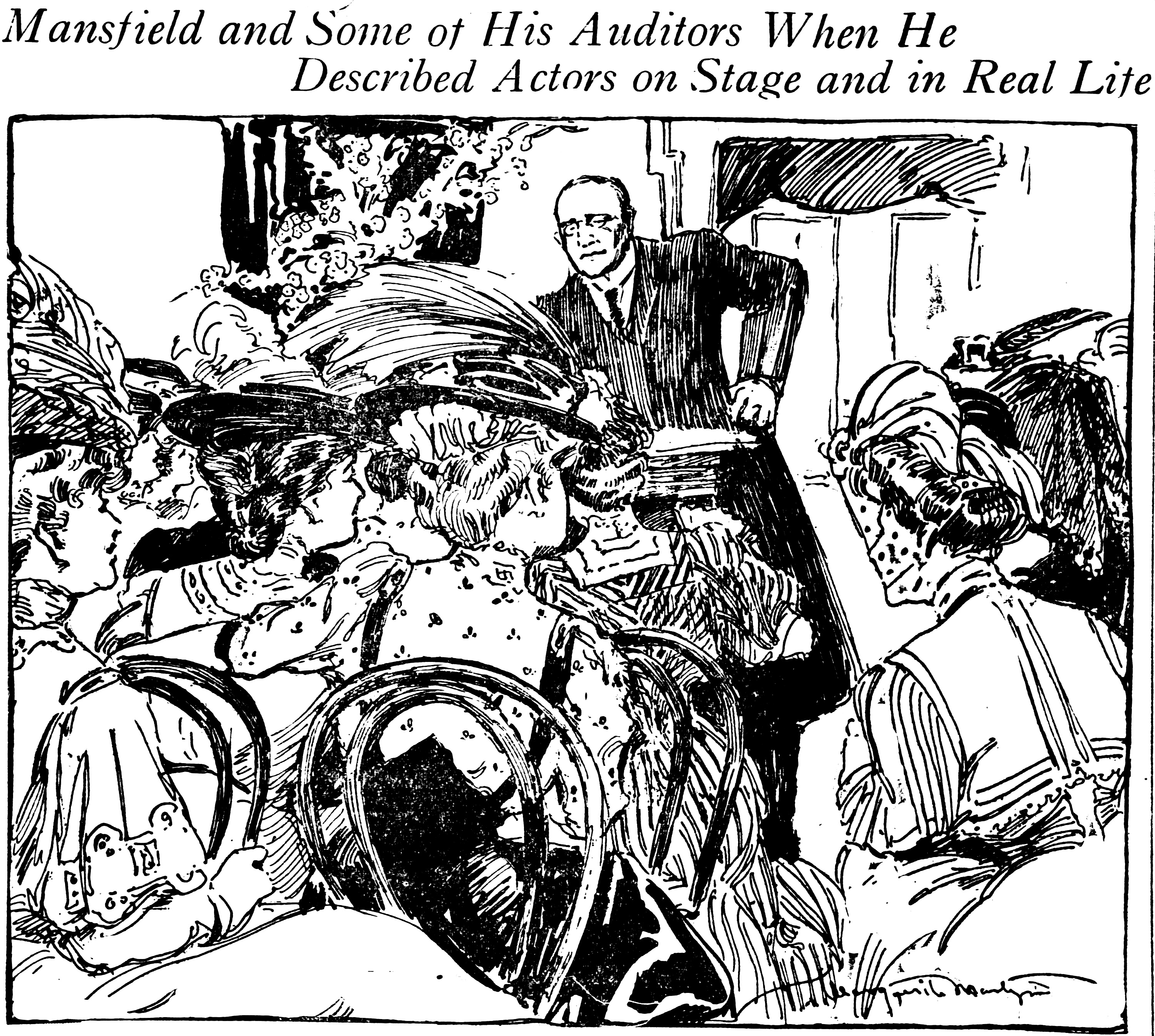
Mansfield lecturing in St. Louis in 1906; illustration by Marguerite Martyn

Mansfield was performing in the London production of the Strange Case of Dr Jekyll and Mr Hyde in 1888 during the time that Jack the Ripper was murdering women in London. One frightened theatre-goer wrote to the police accusing Mansfield of the murders because he could not believe that any actor could make so convincing a stage transformation from a gentleman into a mad killer without being homicidal. Mansfield attempted to gain public favour and stem the criticism that he was receiving by offering a performance of the comedy Prince Karl for the benefit of the Suffragan Bishop of London's home and refuge fund for reformed prostitutes.

== Family life ==
Mansfield was married in 1892 to Beatrice Cameron (1868–1940), an actress. After their wedding, she was often referred to as Mrs Richard Mansfield by the press. In 1898 the couple had their only child, Richard Gibbs Mansfield (1898–1918). The younger Mansfield was an ambulance driver in France early during World War I, eagerly enlisting while underage (with his mother's consent). When America entered the war, he joined the U.S. Army and went to Texas to be part of an aviation unit. There he contracted meningitis and died in 1918. After the war, Mansfield's wife worked with refugees from the Armenian genocide in Turkey and Palestine.
