= Thomas Russell Sullivan =

American writer (1849–1916)

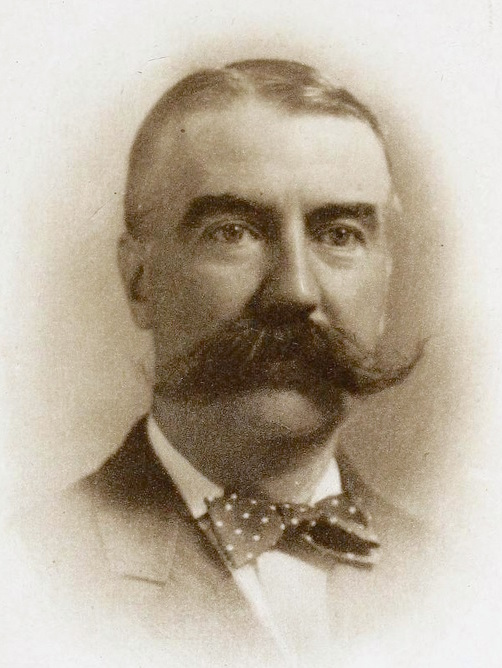
- Born: November 21, 1849; Boston, Massachusetts, U.S.
- Died: June 28, 1916 (aged 66); Boston, Massachusetts, U.S.
- Occupation: Writer
- Spouse: Lucy Wadsworth (1899–1916)
- Writing career
- Language: English
- Period: 1885–1913
- Notable work: Dr. Jekyll and Mr. Hyde

Thomas Russell Sullivan (November 21, 1849 – June 28, 1916) was an American writer. He is best known for Dr. Jekyll and Mr. Hyde, an 1887 stage adaptation of Strange Case of Dr Jekyll and Mr Hyde by Robert Louis Stevenson. He also wrote novels and short stories, often with Gothic motifs. His posthumously published journals have been used as a historical source about the literary culture of Boston in the late 19th and early 20th century.

== Early life ==
Thomas Russell Sullivan was born on November 21, 1849, in one of the three log cabin-style houses on Charles Street in Boston, Massachusetts that were built during the Harrison presidential campaign. He was the son of Thomas Russell Sullivan, a schoolmaster and former Unitarian minister, and Charlotte Caldwell Sullivan (née Blake). His paternal great-grandfather was Massachusetts Governor James Sullivan. Sullivan attended the Boston Latin School and expected to go to Harvard University as his father did, but both his parents died by the time he was 14, forcing him to find work instead.

From 1866 to 1870, Sullivan worked as a clerk in Boston. He then took a job with Bowles Brothers, working in Paris and London from 1870 to 1873. When Bowles Brothers went out of business in 1873, he returned to Boston and found work at Lee, Higginson & Co., a Boston investment bank.

== Writing career ==
While working at Lee, Higginson & Co., Sullivan began writing in his spare time. In the 1870s and early 1880s, he worked on several plays performed at the Boston Museum. His first novel, Roses of Shadow, was published in 1885. He became friends with the actor Richard Mansfield, who in 1887 acquired the theatrical rights to Strange Case of Dr Jekyll and Mr Hyde, an 1886 novella by Robert Louis Stevenson. Mansfield asked Sullivan to write the adaptation. Sullivan doubted whether the story would make a good play, but he agreed to help with the project. The play, titled Dr. Jekyll and Mr. Hyde, debuted at the Boston Museum on May 9, 1887, to a very positive reception. It went to the Madison Square Theatre on Broadway on September 12, 1887, and was a hit. Mansfield's company continued to perform the play for the next 20 years, across the United States and in England.

The success of the play convinced Sullivan to quit his banking job and write full-time. He wrote three more plays, although none were successful. He also wrote several novels and a two-volume collection of short stories, many of which have Gothic elements. He attempted one more stage collaboration with Mansfield, a drama about the Roman emperor Nero, but after its failure the two became estranged.

== Works ==
=== Non-fiction ===
- Lands of Summer (1908)
- Boston New and Old (1912)
- Passages from the Journal 1891-1903 (1917)

=== Novels ===
- Roses of Shadow (1885)
- Tom Sylvester (1893)
- The Courage of Conviction (1902)
- Heart of Us (1912)

=== Short story collections ===
- Day and Night Stories (1890)
- Ars et Vita and Other Stories (1898)
- The Hand of Petrarch and Other Stories (1913)

=== Plays ===
- Hearts are Trumps (co-written with William W. Chamberlin, 1878)
- Midsummer Madness (co-written with William W. Chamberlin, 1880)
- The Catspaw (1881)
- Merely Players (1886)
- Dr. Jekyll and Mr. Hyde (1887)
- Nero (1891)
