= Adaptations of Strange Case of Dr. Jekyll and Mr. Hyde =

Adaptations of 1886 novella

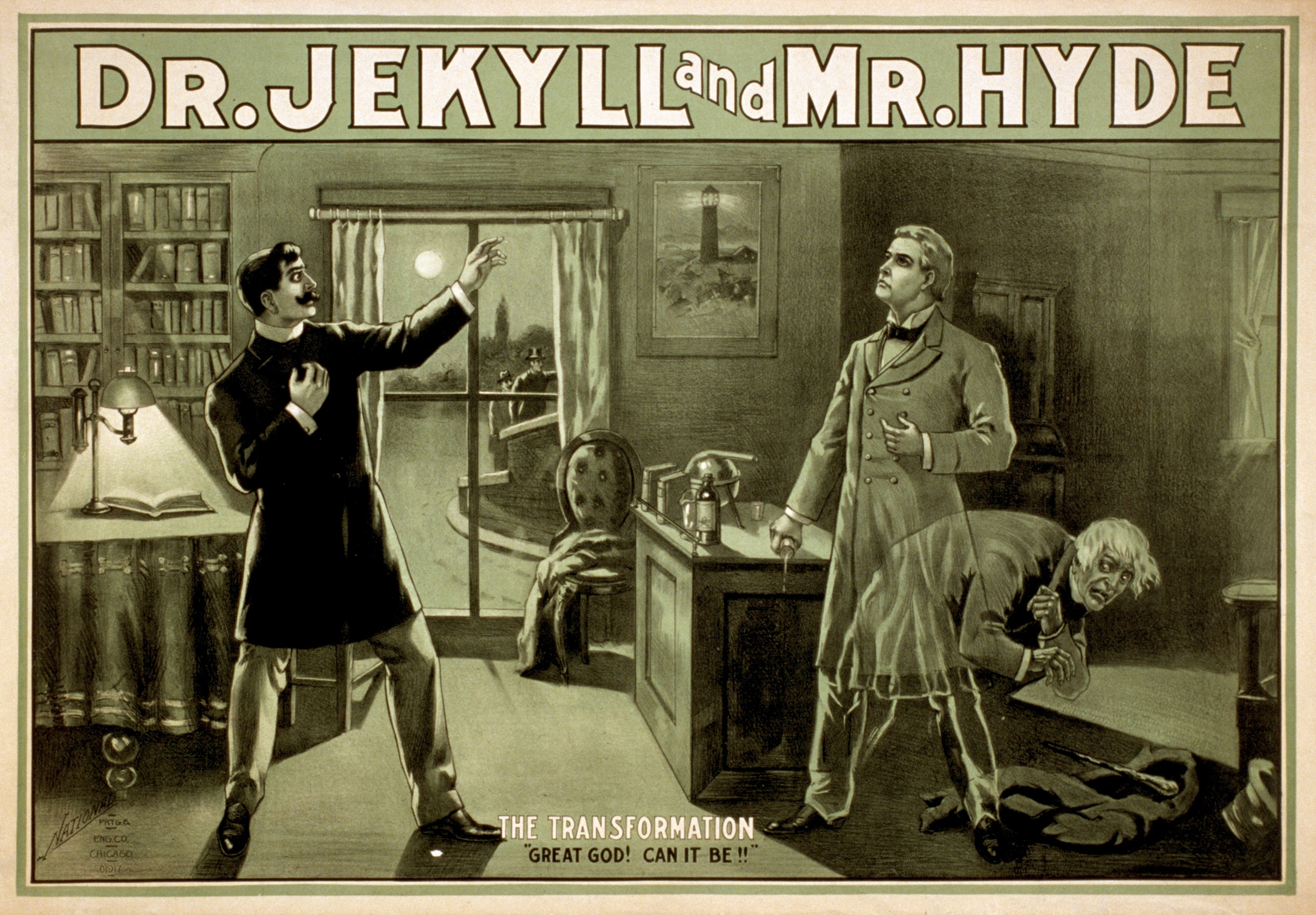
Poster from the 1880s

Strange Case of Dr Jekyll and Mr Hyde is an 1886 novella written by the Scottish author Robert Louis Stevenson. It is about a London lawyer, Gabriel John Utterson, who investigates strange occurrences between his old friend, Dr. Henry Jekyll and the misanthropic Mr. Hyde. In a twist ending, it is revealed that Jekyll and Hyde were the same person, and that Jekyll had regularly transformed himself into Hyde by drinking a serum.

The work is known for its vivid portrayal of a split personality, and since the 1880s dozens of stage and film adaptations have been produced, although there have been no major adaptations to date that remain faithful to the narrative structure of Stevenson's original. Most omit the figure of Utterson, telling the story from Jekyll's and Hyde's viewpoint and often having them played by the same actor, thus eliminating the mystery aspect of the true identity of Hyde. Many adaptations also introduce a romantic element which does not exist in the original story. While Hyde is portrayed in the novella as an evil-looking man of diminutive height, many adaptations have taken liberties with the character's physical appearance: Hyde is sometimes depicted with bestial or monstrous features, although sometimes he is more dashing and debonair than Jekyll, giving an alternate motivation for Jekyll to transform himself.

There are over 123 film versions, in addition to stage and radio versions, and a number of parodies and imitations. Troy Howarth calls Stevenson's novella "the most filmed work of literature in the silent era." Notable examples are listed below.

== Direct adaptations ==
=== Stage ===
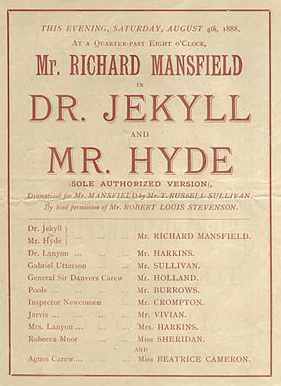
Playbill for Dr. Jekyll and Mr. Hyde (1887)

- 1887, a play in four acts. Thomas Russell Sullivan's Dr. Jekyll and Mr. Hyde opened in Boston in May 1887. The first serious theatrical rendering, it went on to tour Britain and ran for 20 years. It became forever linked with Richard Mansfield's performance; he continued playing the part until shortly before his death in 1907. Sullivan reworked the plot to centre around a domestic love interest.
- 1888, a play in four acts. Dr. Jekyll and Mr. Hyde was written by John McKinney in collaboration with the actor Daniel E. Bandmann. It opened at Niblo's Garden in March 1887 with Bandmann in the title role. Later that year it competed directly with Sullivan's 1887 adaptation, when both opened in London within days of each other.
- 1897, a play in four acts. Dr. Jekyll and Mr. Hyde, Or a Mis-Spent Life was written by Luella Forepaugh and George F. Fish for the repertory company at Forepaugh's Family Theatre in Philadelphia, where it debuted in March 1897. Published in 1904 by Samuel French, Inc. for use by other theatre companies.
- 1900, a play in four acts. Unproduced adaptation by Marcel Schwob and Vance Thompson.
- 1944,July 25th, during world war 2, prisoners are being held in the British Civilian Internment Camp Ilag Giromagny, Dr.Jekyll and Mr Hyde. A Mystery Play in 3 Acts. at 6.30 p.m. with prisoner violinist, Nicholas Roth.
- 1990, musical U.S. Jekyll & Hyde. Music by Frank Wildhorn, book and lyrics by Leslie Bricusse. Originally conceived for the stage by Steve Cuden and Frank Wildhorn. This musical features the song "This Is The Moment".
- 1991, stage play, opened in London. Written by David Edgar for the Royal Shakespeare Company. The play is notable for its fidelity to the book's plot.
- 1994, a musical for schools opened, Jekyll!, written by Alex Went, with music by John Moore, and directed by Peter Fanning. First performed at Shrewsbury School in 1994. The touring production at the 1995 Edinburgh Fringe was awarded a Fringe First for outstanding new drama.
- 2009, a theatrical adaptation by playwright Jeffrey Hatcher, for the local Cincinnati Playhouse in the Park.
- 2010, The Holden Kemble Theatre Company ran an adaptation titled The Scandalous Case of Dr Jekyll and Mr Hyde at the Edinburgh Festival and then a 3 1/2 week run at the Tabard Theatre in Chiswick, London.
- 2012, Synetic Theater ran a critically acclaimed silent adaptation of Jekyll & Hyde featuring Alex Mills as Jekyll/Hyde, Peter Pereyra as Lanyon, and Brittany O'Grady as the Fiancée.
- 2012, new version by Jonathan Holloway workshopped and premiered at the Courtyard Theatre, London, featuring Melody Roche as Jekyll, Charlie Allen as Utterson and Gary Blair as Enfield.
- 2013, a version of the story presented by Flipping the Bird at the Edinburgh Fringe Festival, shows Jekyll as a woman, Dr. Tajemnica Jekyll, recently arrived in London from an unspecified foreign country, whose transformation to Edward Hyde came about as part of her desire to defy social boundaries. Utterson serves as her lover and lawyer, while she claims Hyde is her deformed nephew before admitting the truth.
- 2016, an adaptation and continuation by Mirrored Faces Productions, HYDE written and directed by Jett Ranchhod, performed in Wellington, New Zealand. Ranchhod played Hyde, with Dr Jekyll and his present-day counterpart portrayed by another actor.
- 2022, an adaptation by Neil Bartlett staged at Derby Theatre. In this take on the story, Jekyll and Hyde are minor characters, with the focus being on Dr Stevenson, a new character who investigates Hyde's murders.
- 2022, an adaptation written and directed by Kip Williams for Sydney Theatre Company. The production featured two actors playing multiple characters, and incorporated a blend of live performance and live video projections, receiving a rare 5 star review from the Sydney Morning Herald. The production subsequently toured to the Perth Festival and Adelaide Festival in 2023.
- 2022-24, an adaptation by Gary McNair for solo performance, commissioned and first produced by Reading Rep Theatre in October 2022, with Audrey Brisson in the role of Gabriel John Utterson. The play was subsequently performed by Forbes Masson, directed by Michael Fentiman, at the Lyceum Theatre, Edinburgh, between 13 and 27 January 2024.
- 2023, an adaptation by Jennifer Dick performed in the Glasgow Botanic Gardens for the Bard in the Botanics festival. In this version, Jekyll and Hyde are played by two individual actors.

=== Film ===
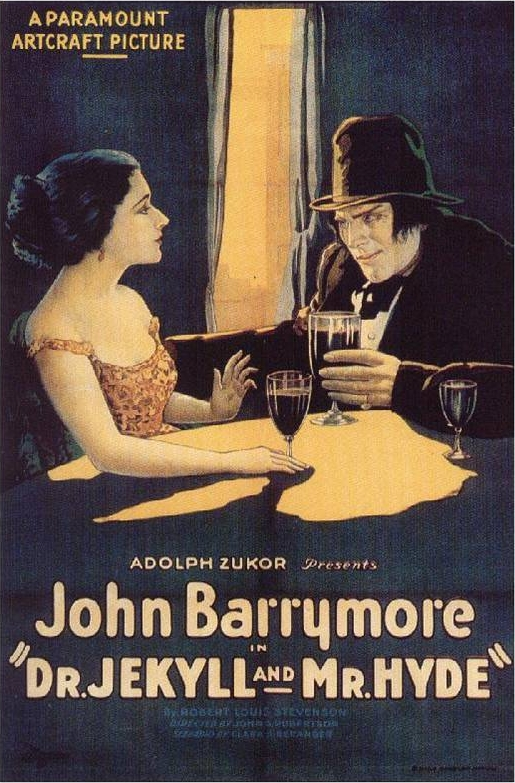
Dr. Jekyll and Mr. Hyde (1920)

- 1908, film U.S., Dr. Jekyll and Mr. Hyde. Produced by William N. Selig. There are no known existing copies of this film.
- 1908, film U.S., Dr. Jekyll and Mr. Hyde. Produced by Kalem Films. Directed by Sidney Olcott, starring Frank Oakes Rose in the lead role.
- 1909, film U.S., A Modern Dr. Jekyll. Produced by William N. Selig. There are no known existing copies of this film.
- 1910, film U.K., The Duality of Man. First Jekyll-Hyde adaptation filmed in England, directed by Harry Brodribb Irving.
- 1910, film Denmark, Den skæbnesvangre Opfindelse (US title: Dr. Jekyll and Mr. Hyde). Directed by August Blom and starring Alwin Neuß for the Nordisk Film company. There are no known existing copies of this film.
- 1912, film U.S., Dr. Jekyll and Mr. Hyde. United States production based on Richard Mansfield's stage performance. Thanhouser Company. Starring James Cruze and Florence Labadie.
- 1913, film U.S., Dr. Jekyll and Mr. Hyde. Produced by Kinemacolor Company of America, filmed in Kinemacolor. Directed by Frank E. Woods, starring Murdock MacQuarrie.
- 1913, film U.S., Dr. Jekyll and Mr. Hyde. Starring King Baggot and directed by Herbert Brenon. Distributed by the Universal Film Manufacturing Company.
- 1914, film U.S., Dr. Jekyll and Mr. Hyde, Done to a Frazzle. Ten-minute satire starring Charles de Forrest as both Jekyll and Hyde.
- 1914, film Germany, Ein Seltsamer Fall (translation: A Strange Case). German Jekyll-Hyde film starring Alwin Neuß and directed by Max Mack.
- 1920, film U.S., Dr. Jekyll and Mr. Hyde. Famous silent film version, starring John Barrymore. Plot follows the Sullivan version of 1887, with elements from The Picture of Dorian Gray.
- 1920, film U.S., Dr. Jekyll and Mr. Hyde. Directed by J. Charles Haydon, starring Sheldon Lewis.
- 1920, film U.S., Dr. Jekyll and Mr. Hyde. Satire starring Hank Mann of the Keystone Cops
- 1931, film U.S., Dr. Jekyll and Mr. Hyde. Known for its acting, visual symbolism, and special effects, it follows the Sullivan plot. Fredric March won the Academy Award for his portrayal. The technical secret of the transformation scenes was not revealed until after the director's death.
- 1941, film U.S., Dr. Jekyll and Mr. Hyde. A remake of the 1931 movie, it stars Spencer Tracy, Ingrid Bergman, and Lana Turner. Unlike the 1931 version, this film uses what Christopher Frayling called "the movie pronunciation", /ˈdʒɛkəl/ JEK-əl, instead of the original /ˈdʒiːkəl/ JEE-kəl.
- 1951, film U.S., The Son of Dr Jekyll, starring Louis Hayward.
- 1953, film U.S., Abbott & Costello Meet Dr. Jekyll and Mr. Hyde
- 1960, Italy, Il mio amico Jekyll (My Friend, Dr. Jekyll) - comedy
- 1960, film U.K., The Two Faces of Dr. Jekyll (released in the U.S. as House of Fright and Jekyll's Inferno). A lurid love triangle and explicit scenes of snakes, opium dens, rape, murder and bodies crashing through glass roofs.
- 1967, film India, Karutha Rathrikal (Dark Nights). A thriller, it was the first science fiction film in Malayalam, the language in which it was made.
- 1981, film India, Chehre Pe Chehra (A face over a face). Hindi film with Sanjeev Kumar playing the characters of Jekyll and Hyde.
- 1981 Docteur Jekyll et les femmes, also known as The Strange Case of Dr. Jekyll and Miss Osbourne and Bloodbath of Dr. Jekyll, France/West Germany, directed by Walerian Borowczyk
- 1985, film U.S.S.R., "The Strange Case of Dr. Jekyll and Mr. Hyde" / "Strannaya Istoria Doktora Jekila i mistera Khaida", Mosfilm Studio with Innokenty Smoktunovsky as Jekyll and soundtrack by Eduard Artemyev. Unlike Stevenson’s 1886 novella, the film is set in Edwardian London. Extended flashbacks to Jekyll’s service as a regimental doctor during the Second Boer War frame the experiment as a response to shell-shock and moral collapse.
- 2002, film U.K., Dr Jekyll and Mr Hyde, Director: Maurice Phillips, starring John Hannah
- 2007, film U.S., Jekyll, starring Matt Keeslar, Jonathan Silverman, Alanna Ubach, and directed by Scott Zakarin.
- 2021, film U.K., Jekyll and Hyde, starring Michael McKell, and directed by Steve Lawson.

=== Radio/Audio ===
- 1930, The Strange Case of Dr. Jekyll and Mr. Hyde, BBC National Programme with Leon M. Lion as Jekyll/Hyde and Carleton Hobbs as Poole.
- 1932, Dr. Jekyll and Mr. Hyde. Available for download at: Dr Jekyll And Mr Hyde. 52 fifteen-minute episodes, likely to have been broadcast weekly over one year. Further details unknown.
- 1944, The Strange Case of Dr. Jekyll and Mr. Hyde, BBC Home Service with Raymond Lovell as Jekyll/Hyde.
- 1945, "Dr. Jekyll and Mr. Hyde", The Weird Circle program episode
- 1948, "Dr. Jekyll and Mr. Hyde", NBC Favorite Story program episode hosted by Ronald Colman, starring William Conrad and selected by Alfred Hitchcock
- 1949, "Dr. Jekyll and Mr. Hyde", CBS Bookshelf of the World program episode
- 1952, "Dr. Jekyll and Mr. Hyde", NBC Presents: Short Story program episode (transcribed but never aired)
- 1954, "Dr. Jekyll and Mr. Hyde", NBC Theatre Royal program episode hosted by and starring Laurence Olivier
- 1960, The Strange Case of Dr. Jekyll and Mr. Hyde, BBC Home Service with Cyril Shaps as Jekyll/Hyde.
- 1966, The Strange Case of Dr. Jekyll and Mr. Hyde, BBC Light Programme with John Justin as Jekyll/Hyde.
- 1974, "Dr. Jekyll and Mr. Hyde", CBS Radio Mystery Theater program episode hosted by E. G. Marshall and starring Kevin McCarthy
- 1985, The Strange Case of Dr. Jekyll and Mr. Hyde, BBC Radio 4 dramatization with Michael Aldridge as Jekyll, James Bryce as Hyde and Bernard Hepton as Utterson
- 1993, The Strange Case of Dr. Jekyll and Mr. Hyde, BBC Radio 4 dramatization with Alexander Morton as Jekyll/Hyde and David Tennant as Policeman
- 2007, Dr. Jekyll and Mr. Hyde, BBC Radio 4 Saturday Play with Adam Godley as Jekyll/Hyde and Christine Kavanagh as Mrs. Utterson.
- 2016, The Strange Case of Dr. Jekyll and Mr. Hyde, BBC Radio 4 Drama on 4 with Stuart McQuarrie as Jekyll, John Dougall as Hyde and Madeleine Worrall as Lorna Utterson Adapted by Neil Brand, this version is presented as a speculation of what the original Jekyll & Hyde would have been like before Stevenson edited it based on his wife's objections, and introduces the twist of a third identity for Jekyll in the form of George Denman, intended to represent all the most positive aspects of Jekyll's character, only for Denman to regress to Hyde when he loses his temper.
- 2022, Big Finish Classics: Jekyll and Hyde, Big Finish Productions with John Heffernan as Jekyll and Hyde.
- 2024, The Strange Case, Audible Original with Vanessa Kirby as Jekyll and Hyde, David Oyelowo as Louis and Sofie Gråbøl as Sigrun.

=== Television ===
- 1955, Season 1 episode of CBS's live CLIMAX! drama program Dr. Jekyll & Mr. Hyde starring Michael Rennie. Hosted by Bill Lundigan, this episode was originally aired on 28 July 1955 (Season 1 Episode 34). It ran 60 minutes originally, but was edited down to 45 minutes on home video. The story was adapted for television by Gore Vidal.
- 1968, TV U.S. and Canada, The Strange Case of Dr. Jekyll and Mr. Hyde. Starring Jack Palance, directed by Charles Jarrott and produced by Dan Curtis of Dark Shadows fame. Nominated for several Emmy awards, it follows Hyde on sexual conquests and hack and slash murders, and gives a twist to the usual film ending when Jekyll-as-Hyde remains as Hyde following his being shot and killed. The TV-movie aired on CBC in Canada on 3 January 1968 and on ABC in the U.S. on 7 January.
- 1973, TV U.S. and U.K., Dr. Jekyll and Mr. Hyde, a musical made-for-TV version starring Kirk Douglas. No relation to the later musical version, the songs for this one were by Lionel Bart. Directed by David Winters.
- 1980, TV U.K., Dr. Jekyll and Mr. Hyde, a BBC adaptation directed by Alastair Reid with David Hemmings in the title roles. This version turns the convention of the (performed) role upside down, with Hemmings appearing in heavy make-up as Jekyll, and with less makeup as a debonair, man-about-town version of Hyde. This version also gives a twist to the usual film ending when Jekyll's body remains as Hyde following his suicide, reflecting how it was in the original Stevenson story.
- 1986, animated Australian telefilm, Dr. Jekyll and Mr. Hyde, with Max Meldrum as Jekyll, David Nettheim as Hyde and John Ewart as Utterson, made by the Burbank production company. This version is notable for being the only animated adaptation of the story.
- 1989, The Strange Case of Dr. Jekyll and Mr. Hyde, TV U.S., with Laura Dern and Anthony Andrews in the dual role. This version was adapted by J. Michael Straczynski. Broadcast as episode 3 of the horror anthology series Nightmare Classics.
- 1990, TV UK, Jekyll & Hyde, a made-for-television film starring Michael Caine in the title roles. Added to the story is the character of Jekyll's sister-in-law Sara Crawford (played by Cheryl Ladd), who is raped by Hyde.
- 2002, TV U.K., Dr. Jekyll and Mr. Hyde starring John Hannah as both characters, with body language and wardrobe the only distinction between the appearance of the two. Initially Hyde is identified as a mental patient that Jekyll had 'hired' as a test subject, but when Hyde died during a riot in the asylum, Jekyll used Hyde's name for his other identity as his staff were already expecting Hyde as a new presence in the house. The narrative is chronologically disjointed, beginning with the end of the story, then returning to the beginning via narrated flashbacks, with the occasional brief glimpse of the reading of Jekyll's confession by Utterson.
- 2008, TV, Dr. Jekyll and Mr. Hyde, starring Dougray Scott, Tom Skerritt, and Krista Bridges.
- 2015, TV, Dr. Jekyll and Mr. Hyde, starring Gianni Capaldi, Shaun Paul Piccinino and Mickey Rooney in his final role.

=== Books ===
- 2001, Ludovic Debeurme's Dr. Jekyll and Mr. Hyde, an illustrated edition adapted for young readers.
- 2025, The Strange Case of Dr. Jekyll and Mr. Hyde, Contemporary Edition for Adult Readers, adapted into modern English by John Delaube.

=== Comics ===
- Dr. Jekyll and Mr. Hyde, adaptation by Lorenzo Mattotti and Jerry Kramsky which won the Eisner Award for Best U.S. Edition of Foreign Material in 2003.
- A condensed version of the story was adapted in 1982 as a short comic book titled Przeobrażenie (The Transformation), by Polish illustrator Marek Szyszko, with Stefan Weinfeld. In 1983 Szyszko and Weinfeld adapted the story once again, this time as a full-length comic book Dr Jekyll & Mr Hyde, which closely followed Stevenson's complete story and kept its title.
- A Disney comics parody of the story first published in Topolino in 2014, titled The Strange Case of Dr. Ratkyll and Mr. Hyde, casts Mickey Mouse and Donald Duck in the respective title roles, with Mickey physically transforming into Donald throughout the story.
- An upcoming graphic novel Hyde will be written by Jesse Negron and Joe Matsumoto and art by Gary Erskine and Chris Weston. The comic also has creative input from filmmaker Ridley Scott and actor Johnny Depp. Depp's likeness is used for Hyde, and he additionally filmed a short teaser to promote the comic.

=== Video games ===
- 1988, video game, Dr. Jekyll and Mr Hyde for the NES, created by Toho.
- 2001, adventure game, Jekyll and Hyde for Windows platform, developed by In Utero and published by Cryo Interactive.
- 2010, hidden object game, The Mysterious Case of Dr. Jekyll and Mr. Hyde for various platforms, developed by Mad Data Games.
- 2010, adventure game, Jekyll and Hyde for Windows platform, developed by Pixelcage GmbH.
- In 2018, a dating simulator created by game company NTT Solmare titled Guard Me, Sherlock has a version of Jekyll and Hyde; however, in this adaptation they are not the same person and are instead brothers, Jekyll being the elder, and unlike many other adaptations, Hyde is not depicted as monstrous and instead appears as a normal brown-haired, blue-eyed male with a scar across his face.
- In 2020, Korean gaming company Growing Seeds released MazM: Jekyll and Hyde as part of a series of games. It stays remarkably close to the book, while providing informations about British society at the time, giving some context regarding customs, morals, ethics, work, interests, social classes, politics and such.

== Re-tellings ==
=== Film ===
- 1971, film U.K., Dr. Jekyll and Sister Hyde. Starring Ralph Bates as Jekyll and Martine Beswick as Hyde. The earliest work to show Jekyll transform into a beautiful woman. The film notably recasts Jekyll from a kind, well-intentioned man into Jack the Ripper, who uses Sister Hyde as a disguise to carry out his murders. Jekyll also employs the services of Burke and Hare.
- 1971, film U.K., I, Monster. Starring Christopher Lee in the Jekyll and Hyde role and Peter Cushing as Utterson. Recasts Jekyll (with a name change to Dr. Charles Marlowe/Mr. Edward Blake) as a 1906 Freudian psychotherapist. Retains some of Stevenson's original plot and dialogue.
- 1973, film U.S. Horror High. Starring Pat Cardi in the Jekyll and Hyde role, and taking place in a contemporary Texas high-school. Recasts Jekyll as a nerdy high-school student who uses a newly-invented drug of his to get revenge on his cruel teachers.
- 1976, film U.S. Dr. Black, Mr. Hyde, a blaxploitation version by William Crain starring Bernie Casey (as Dr. Henry Pride) and Rosalind Cash.
- Dr. Heckyl and Mr. Hype, 1980 film starring Oliver Reed, in which a kindly but hideous doctor develops a potion that turns him into a suave, but evil, man of the world.
- 1981, film France, Docteur Jekyll et les femmes (The Strange Case of Dr Jekyll and Miss Osbourne) with Udo Kier. In this version, the plot takes place over a single night of mayhem.
- 1989, film U.S., Edge of Sanity, a low-budget adaptation with Anthony Perkins as a version of Jekyll whose experiments with synthetic cocaine transform him into Hyde, who is also Jack the Ripper.
- 2006, film U.S., The Strange Case of Dr. Jekyll and Mr. Hyde, set in modern times instead of Victorian England.
- 2006, film Canada, Jekyll + Hyde. Starring Bryan Fisher as Henry "J" Jekyll and Bree Turner as Utterson. Two medical students set out to create a drug derived from ecstasy that would enhance and change their personalities.
- 2017, film France, Madame Hyde. Marie Géquil and Madame Hyde were played by Isabelle Huppert.

=== Television ===
- 1959, TV France, The Doctor's Horrible Experiment (Le Testament du Docteur Cordelier). A modern adaptation of Stevenson's novel directed by Jean Renoir. It stars Jean-Louis Barrault, Teddy Bilis, and Michel Vitold.
- Julia Jekyll and Harriet Hyde, a 1995 British children's television series which aired on BBC One
- 1999, TV U.S., Dr. Jekyll and Mr. Hyde starring Adam Baldwin. In this modern-day re-imagining, plastic surgeon Henry Jekyll learns ancient Chinese herbal medicine will give him superhuman powers, which he uses to exact revenge for his wife's murder. Francis Ford Coppola produced.
- 2015, South Korean television romance-thriller series, Hyde Jekyll, Me, starring Hyun Bin as both Hyde and Jekyll, renamed Seo-jin and Robin. In this version, Hyde is the main personality, while Jekyll is the new personality created by an accident.

=== Radio/Audio ===
- 2012, BBC Radio Scotland crime drama, The Strange Case of Dr. Hyde, a four-part reworking of the Stevenson story written by Chris Dolan set in modern-day Edinburgh. Detective Inspector Newman (David Rintoul), assisted by Detective Constable Lanyon (Kenny Blyth), is investigating a series of mutilation murders and seeks the help of eccentric pathologist Dr. Hyde (Jimmy Chisholm), becoming involved along the way with solicitor Jane Poole (Wendy Seager).
- 2023, The Confession of Henry Jekyll, M.D., LA Theatre Works with Seamus Dever as Jekyll and Robert Hyde
- 2024, The Strange Case, Audible Original with Vanessa Kirby as Jekyll/Hyde, David Oyelowo as Louis and Sofie Gråbøl as Sigrun

=== Books ===
- 1890, The Untold Sequel of the Strange Case of Dr. Jekyll and Mr. Hyde by Frances H. Little is a re-telling of the story based on the idea that Edward Hyde was an actual person, a former actor whom Jekyll had met in America and brought to London, and not the alter ego of Henry Jekyll.
- 1979, Dr. Jekyll and Mr. Holmes by Loren D. Estleman is a retelling of the story based on the idea that Utterson hired Sherlock Holmes to investigate Hyde's connection to Jekyll in the belief that Hyde is a blackmailer.
- The 1996 Robert Swindells novel Jacqueline Hyde concerns the protagonist's struggle with her 'Hyde' after smelling a bottle, the contents of which releases her bad side.
- Jekyll and Heidi, a 1999 book in the Goosebumps series.
- The Strange Case of Doctor Jekyll and Mademoiselle Odile, a 2012 YA novel by James Reese features a young Cagot witch named Odile Ricau who brews a salt potion to save her brother but accidentally lets it fall into the hands of a young Dr. Jekyll, who uses the salts and potion to change into Mister Hyde for the first time. Serves as an origin story for Jekyll and Hyde and as a prequel to the story.
- 2023, My Dear Henry: A Jekyll & Hyde Remix by Kalynn Bayron is a retelling of the story in which the characters are black university students. It also deals with themes of homosexuality during the time period of the novel. Henry Jekyll becomes Hyde via a potion created by his father Dr. Jekyll in order to remove his feelings for Gabriel.

=== Music ===
- 2013, Hyde extended play by Korean pop group VIXX features song hyde and G.R.8.U, telling the perspective of D. Jekyll and Mr. Hyde respectively.

== Story from alternate viewpoints ==
- 1990, novel, Mary Reilly by Valerie Martin, a reworking of Stevenson's plot told from the viewpoint of a maid in Jekyll's household, named Mary Reilly in this novel.
- 1996, film U.S., Mary Reilly. Starring Julia Roberts and John Malkovich and based on the 1990 novel.
- 2014, the novel Hyde by Daniel Levine tells the story from Hyde's perspective and adds new elements to the plot.

== Sequels ==
=== Film ===
- 1951, film U.S., The Son of Dr. Jekyll. Dr. Jekyll's illegitimate son Edward tries to recreate his father's formula to clear his father's name.
- 1957, film U.S., The Daughter of Dr. Jekyll. A young woman discovers she is the daughter of Dr. Jekyll. This low-budget adaptation includes the bizarre and unique feature of Mr. Hyde as a "human werewolf", who can only be destroyed by a stake through the heart, which is the traditional way of killing vampires, not werewolves.
- 1959, film U.K., The Ugly Duckling. A comedy film and the first of three adaptations of the story by Hammer Film Productions. It has nothing to do with the story of "The Ugly Duckling", despite its name. The film is about a modern-day Henry Jekyll who is a great-grandson of the original Dr. Jekyll, and discovers his great-grandfather's formula.
- Dr. Jekyll and Ms. Hyde, 1995 comedy film starring Tim Daly, Sean Young and Lysette Anthony, in which a descendant of Dr. Jekyll creates a variant of his ancestor's potion that turns him into a woman.
- Doctor Jekyll, a 2023 film starring Eddie Izzard as the granddaughter of Henry Jekyll, and directed by Joe Stephenson.

=== Television ===
- 2007, TV U.K., Jekyll. A six-part BBC serial starring James Nesbitt as Tom Jackman, a modern Jekyll whose Hyde wreaks havoc in modern London.
- 2015, TV U.K., Jekyll and Hyde is a "superhero-themed" 10-episode series, produced by ITV Studios for ITV.

=== Books ===
- In The Jekyll Legacy, a 1990 novel by Robert Bloch and Andre Norton. Hester Lane, a reporter from Canada, discovers that she is Jekyll's niece and heir, and that someone else is continuing Jekyll's experiments. The novel takes an even more sinister turn as Jekyll's butler Poole and Utterson are bludgeoned to death.
- In Anthony O'Neill's 2017 novel Dr. Jekyll & Mr. Seek, which takes place seven years after the events of the original book, Gabriel Utterson confronts a man claiming to be Dr. Jekyll.
- 2021, Jekyll and Hyde: Resurrection by Alexander Bayliss was released on 5 January to commemorate the 135th anniversary of the publication of the original. It is a contemporary urban thriller in which a modern-day descendant of Dr. Jekyll discovers his ancestor's old formula.
- In Dr. Jekyll and Mr. Hyde in America, a 2022 novel by Louis K. Lowy, the story is set after Hyde fails to die from his suicide attempt at the end of the original novella. Hyde sets out to create a name for himself in America by attempting to become an infamous serial killer, while Jekyll pursues a romantic interest with an actress.

== Spoofs and parodies ==
Dr. Pyckle and Mr. Pryde (1924)

- Dr. Pyckle and Mr. Pryde, a 1924 silent, black-and-white comedy film starring Stan Laurel in a solo film appearance and directed by Percy Pembroke. A parody in which the Hyde character Mr. Pride is more of a compulsive prankster than evil.
- The Impatient Patient, a 1942 Looney Tunes Daffy Duck cartoon where, suffering from hiccups, he ends up meeting a Dr. Jerkyl while trying to deliver a telegram to someone named "Chloe".
- Mighty Mouse Meets Jekyll and Hyde Cat, a 1944 Mighty Mouse cartoon.
- Dr. Jekyll and Mr. Mouse, a 1947 Tom and Jerry cartoon.
- Abbott and Costello Meet Dr. Jekyll and Mr. Hyde, a 1953 horror comedy film starring the comedy team of Abbott and Costello and Boris Karloff as Jekyll, with an uncredited Eddie Parker (Karloff's stuntman) as Mr. Hyde.
- Dr. Jerkyl's Hide, a 1954 Looney Tunes cartoon featuring Sylvester the Cat, bulldog Alfie and terrier Chester, with Sylvester as the dual character.
- Hyde and Hare, a 1955 Looney Tunes cartoon featuring Bugs Bunny.
- Hyde and Go Tweet, a 1960 Looney Tunes cartoon featuring Sylvester and Tweety, with the bird as the dual character.
- "And Then There Were None", 1966 episode of Gilligan's Island featuring Gilligan as Dr. Gilligan, an Oscar Wilde-style Victorian doctor who transforms into a monster at the mention of food.
- "With Apologies to Mr. Hyde", a 1971 comedic short segment from Night Gallery, starring Adam West as Dr. Jekyll and Mr. Hyde.
- The Adult Version of Jekyll & Hide, 1972 "underground" erotic film starring John Barnum as "Dr. Leeder" who finds and uses Jekyll's diary and formula, turning him into "Miss Hyde" (Jane Tsentas)
- Dottor Jekyll e gentile signora, 1980 Italian comedy film starring Paolo Villaggio and Edwige Fenech
- Jekyll and Hyde... Together Again, 1982, a campy satire with Mark Blankfield as Jekyll who experiments with a "drug to replace all surgery", which is inadvertently mixed with an unknown substance.
- "Wondergran Meets Dr. Jackal and Mr. Hide", on the first episode of Season 12 of The Benny Hill Show. Produced in 1981, Benny Hill is surgeon Dr. Jackal who, unable to have a proper meal and drinking a mix of chemicals to assuage his hunger, changes into the evil monster Mr. Hide.
- "Dr. Jekyll & Mr. McDuck", 1987 episode of Disney's DuckTales
- Dr. Jerkoff and Mr. Hard, a 1997 Direct-to-Video gay pornographic film starring Jim Buck as "Dr. Jerkoff/Mr. Hard"
- Dr Jekyll i Mr Hyde według Wytwórni A'YoY – Polish movie from 1999
- Dr. Jekyll and Mistress Hyde, 2003 direct-to-DVD erotic film starring Julian Wells as "Dr. Jackie Stevenson/Heidi Hyde"
- "The Strange Case of Dr. Jiggle and Mr. Sly", which appeared as part of the VeggieTales 2004 video A Snoodle's Tale
- Jacqueline Hyde, 2005 direct-to-DVD erotic film starring Gabriella Hall as the normal "Jackie Hyde" and Blythe Metz as her "Jacqueline Hyde" counterpart
- In the Rooster Teeth Animation RWBY, the book "The Man with Two Souls," a reference to the book. A sequel is called "The Man with Two Souls II: The Man with Four Souls."
- Jekyll & Hyde, 2016 stage show portraying a camp interpretation of the story. The show was created and performed by New Zealand group A Slightly Isolated Dog.

== Jekyll and Hyde as characters in other stories ==
- Mad Monster Party?, a 1967 American animated comedy film, features Dr. Jekyll and Mr. Hyde as guests at a party thrown by Baron Boris von Frankenstein.
- "Nowhere to Hyde," the 12 September 1970, episode of Scooby-Doo, Where Are You! in which the ghost of Mr. Hyde is committing jewelry store robberies and one of the suspects is a descendant of Dr. Jekyll.
- Mad Mad Mad Monsters, a 1972 American animated "prequel of sorts" to Mad Monster Party?. Dr. Jekyll appears only twice briefly in the story and is not mentioned by name until the second time at the end, where he drinks his potion and changes into Mr. Hyde.
- 1972, film Spain, Dr. Jekyll y el Hombre Lobo, a Paul Naschy film in his long-running series that pits werewolf Waldemar Daninsky against a descendant of Dr. Jekyll.
- 1975, TV U.S., The Ghost Busters, a Filmation series featuring ghosts of historical and literary figures. In the episode "Jekyll & Hyde: Together for the First Time!", Severn Darden stars as Jekyll alongside Joe E. Ross as Mr. Hyde.
- Scooby-Doo! and the Reluctant Werewolf, a 1988 comedy film, features a race between a number of classic Hollywood inspired monsters including "Dr. Jekyll/Mr. Snyde."
- 1993, animated film, The Nightmare Before Christmas, Mr. Hyde appears as one of the citizens of Halloween Town. Only seen in his "Hyde" form, he keeps two smaller versions of himself underneath his hat.
- 1994, film U.S., The Pagemaster, a mix of animation and live action, Dr. Jekyll and Mr. Hyde appear as the movie's first villain (voiced by Leonard Nimoy).
- 2003, film The League of Extraordinary Gentlemen, adapted from Alan Moore's eponymous comic book series. The film adaptation stars Jason Flemyng as both Dr. Jekyll and Mr. Hyde, the latter using prosthetic makeup. Dr. Jekyll and Mr. Hyde are employed by the League of Extraordinary Gentlemen to combat the Fantom. The version of Hyde depicted in both comic and movie bears more resemblance to the Hulk than the malevolent dwarf of the novel, possessing great strength and size. As in the comic book on which it is based, this is attributed to Hyde "growing, free from boundaries, free from limitations" (although the film version is still dependent on Jekyll drinking the serum to transform, rather than Hyde no longer requiring the potion to manifest).
- 2004, film Van Helsing. Robbie Coltrane provides the voice of a CGI animated Mr. Hyde, whom Van Helsing unintentionally kills at the Cathedral of Notre Dame when pursuing him through Paris. Like in The League of Extraordinary Gentleman, Mr. Hyde is portrayed as a large, hulking brute. When Hyde dies, he transforms back into Dr. Jekyll. Dr. Jekyll and Mr. Hyde is also the focus of the film's animated prequel Van Helsing: The London Assignment, where Hyde is shown as Jack the Ripper, stealing souls each night for a youth potion that Jekyll, in the guise of a royal physician, uses to restore Queen Victoria's youth and seduce her.
- 2008, film U.S., Igor. Jaclyn (Jennifer Coolidge) stars as the henchwoman of Dr. Schadenfreude (Eddie Izzard), turning into Heidi to spy on Schadenfreude's competition.
- The Phineas and Ferb episode "The Monster of Phineas-n-Ferbenstein" features the villain Dr. Jekyll Doofenshmirtz drinking a potion to turn himself into a monster in order to win a "Best Monster" contest.
- 2012, Sony Pictures animated film, Hotel Transylvania, Mr. Hyde can be seen as one of the monsters in Hotel Transylvania. This version has an underbite, has pale yellow skin, and wears a suit and a top hat.
- 2014, In Fate/Prototype: Fragments of Blue & Silver, a light novel series based on the original drafts of Fate/stay night, Dr. Jekyll appears as the Servant of the Berserker class, portrayed as a gentle and good looking young man. His Noble Phantasm allows him to transform into Mr. Hyde.
- The Glass Scientists, 2015 webcomic adaptation by Sage Cotugno, features Hyde constantly at odds with Dr. Jekyll's pursuit of improving the reputation of mad scientists in the public eye, who are generally ostracized following the death of the infamous Dr. Frankenstein. Lanyon plays a greater role in this adaptation, acting as Jekyll's business partner and taking up Utterson's role in the original novel as Jekyll's close friend. The webcomic is ongoing.
- 2016, TV U.S., Once Upon a Time seasons 5 and 6, with Hank Harris as Dr. Jekyll and Sam Witwer as Mr. Hyde. In this version, Rumplestiltskin helps Dr. Jekyll to create his formula, hoping to benefit from Dr. Jekyll's work. Dr. Jekyll still has evil tendencies at times, and Hyde can be nice. The characters are separate and appear in the present day.
- 2016, TV U.K., Penny Dreadful season 3, with Shazad Latif as Dr. Henry Jekyll. Here, Jekyll is an old medical school friend of Victor Frankenstein's, who once schemed with him to upend the medical establishment. He comes to Victor's aid after the latter has lost control of his creations.
- In 2017, Russell Crowe plays Dr. Jekyll (and Mr. Hyde) in The Mummy, which is the first installment in the Dark Universe film series and is a role which was planned to be elaborated on in further films within the series similar to Marvel. However due the film’s poor performance, the cancellation of the so-called Dark Universe put a stop to these plans.
- The Strange Case of the Alchemist's Daughter (2017) by Theodora Goss is the first novel of the Athena Club series, which features the daughters of various prominent scientists from Victorian literature banding together to oppose their fathers' schemes. The first members of the club are Mary Jekyll, Doctor Jekyll's legitimate daughter, and the near-feral Diana Hyde, with the first novel seeing these two meeting their fellows and confronting the still-living Edward Hyde.
- Jekyll and Hyde Inc., a novel published in 2021 by Simon R. Green. The story is about an ex-police officer called Daniel Carter who is recruited by Jekyll and Hyde Inc. to become a 'Hyde', to destroy the rest of the monster clans with the help of a woman called Tina. Edward Hyde from the original story appears as the owner of the company and has a significant role in the plot.
- Sherlock Holmes and Mr. Hyde, (2022) by Christian Klaver, is the second book in the Classified Dossier series in which Sherlock Holmes meets various supernatural figures in Victorian literature, such as Dracula and Dorian Gray. Jekyll and Hyde in this story are interpreted as Jekyll being more selfish and concerned with only appearing good, and Hyde as being more heroic and unconcerned with the rules of upper class society.

== Similar stories ==
Der Januskopf (1920)

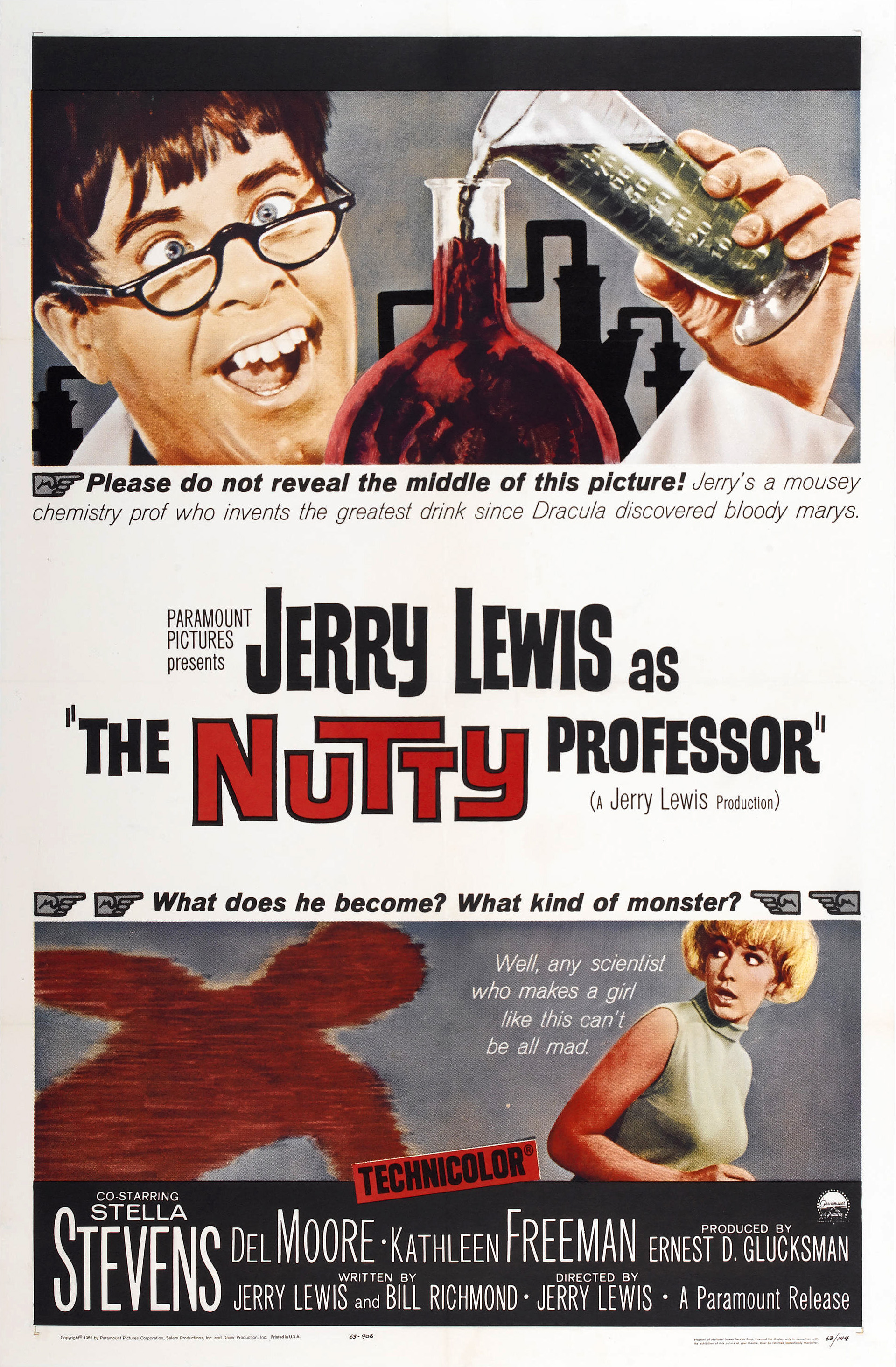
The Nutty Professor (1963)

- 1920, film Germany, Der Januskopf (literally, The Janus-Head, Janus being a Roman God depicted with two faces). Directed by F. W. Murnau. An unauthorized version of Stevenson's story, disguised by changing the names to Dr. Warren and Mr. O'Connor. The dual roles were essayed by Conrad Veidt, with an early role for Bela Lugosi, who plays the equivalent of Mr. Poole, Jekyll's butler. The film is now lost.
- Motor Mania, a 1950 Goofy cartoon in which he transforms into a Mr. Hyde-type split personality.
- Sicque! Sicque! Sicque!, the ninth episode of The Inspector animated film series. It was produced in 1966 and features Deux-Deux drinking a green potion from a test tube and constantly changing into a huge, ugly, green monster when the Inspector is not looking. The monster Deux-Deux becomes keeps shooting and stomping on the Inspector.
- 1963, film U.S., The Nutty Professor. Directed by Jerry Lewis. This comedy film retains a thin connection to the original.
- In the "1970 Parallel Time" storyline (March 27, 1970 - July 17, 1970) of the ABC daytime serial Dark Shadows, Dr. Cyrus Longworth (played by Christopher Pennock) creates a formula that turns him into the dark-haired, mustachioed and evil "John Yaeger" (also played by Pennock).
- 1981, film India, Chehre Pe Chehra (lit. 'A face over a face') is an Indian Bollywood thriller film produced and directed by Raj Tilak. It stars Sanjeev Kumar as Dr. Wilson / Blackstone.
- "Nasty Stuff", 1986 episode of claymation series The Trap Door in which Berk makes a headache cure which turns him into a monstrous version of himself.
- 2013, TV U.S., Do No Harm, an NBC series. This is a contemporary take on the story, with actor Steven Pasquale in dual roles as Dr. Jason Cole/Ian Price. Cole is a successful neurosurgeon who has long been able to suppress Price, his evil alternate personality, with an experimental drug. However, Price develops an immunity to the drug and subsequently wreaks havoc on Cole's life when he is in control.
- The Penn Zero: Part-Time Hero episode "Rip-Penn" features Penn as Dr. Barzelby (inspired by Dr. Jekyll) who accidentally drinks a potion that turns him into a monster version of Penn's nemesis Rippen.

== Other cultural references ==
- The Prize Pest, a 1951 Looney Tunes Daffy Duck and Porky Pig cartoon where Daffy adopts a "Jekyll and Hyde routine" split personality in order to scare Porky Pig.
- In season 10 of CSI: Crime Scene Investigation, the serial killer Charles DiMesa a.k.a. Dr. Jekyll is active.
- In Power Rangers Dino Super Charge, the name of the character Heckyl refers to Dr. Jekyll and Mr. Hyde because he has a split personality and shares a body with Snide.
- 2010, television series, Sanctuary, the character Adam Worth's story was stolen by a former friend and retold under the "fictional" title of Strange Case of Dr. Jekyll and Mr. Hyde. Adam's psychological disorder is one of "split personality" at a time before modern psychiatry.
- Young Gothic, a 2024 young adult novel by M.A. Bennett, contains a character called Hal Fraser who has heterochromia. He is an allusion to Henry Jekyll and Edward Hyde, as he has an evil alternate personality called Ed, who has his eye colours swapped when he takes over.

== Music ==
The following songs and albums make reference to the novel:

- "Docteur Jekyll et Monsieur Hyde" (1968) by Serge Gainsbourg and Brigitte Bardot, from the album Initials B.B..
- "Dr. Jekyll and Mr. Hyde" (1968) by The Who, which was released in two different versions: one as the B-side of the single "Magic Bus", which was also included on the album Magic Bus: The Who on Tour; and a longer one, released as the B-side of "Call Me Lightning".
- "Doctor Jimmy" (1973), an allegorical song also by The Who, with the refrain "Dr. Jimmy and Mr. Jim", on the album Quadrophenia.
- Dr. Heckle and Mr. Jive, a 1979 album from England Dan and John Ford Coley
- "Dr. Jekyll & Mr. Hyde" (1980) by The Damned, from the album The Black Album.
- "Dr. Heckyll & Mr. Jive" (1982) by Men At Work, from the album Cargo.
- "Bark at the Moon" (1983) by Ozzy Osbourne, from the album Bark at the Moon.
- "Dr. Jekyll a Mr. Hyde" (1986) by Slovak singer Miroslav Žbirka, from the album Chlapec z ulice
- ”Doc. Jekyll Mister Hyde” (1995) by eurobeat singer Roberto Gabrielli under alias Franz Tornado
- "Bubba Hyde" (1995) by Diamond Rio. The video starred Jim J. Bullock as both Barney Jekyll and Bubba Hyde.
- "Jekyll and Hyde" (2001) by Judas Priest, from the album Demolition.
- Jekyll and Hyde, a 2003 album by Petra, and its title song.
- "Mrs Hyde" (2005), by Italian rock noir band Belladonna
- "Mr Hyde" (2007) by French pop rock band BB Brunes, from the album Blonde comme moi.
- "Jekyll or Hyde" (2010) by progressive metal singer James LaBrie, from the album Static Impulse.
- "Mr. Hyde" (2011) by Figure, from the album Monsters of Drumstep vol. 2.
- Hyde, a 2013 EP by Korean boyband VIXX, and its title song; it was repackaged as Jekyll, which also contains the song "Jekyll".
- "Mz. Hyde" (2013) by Halestorm, from the album The Strange Case Of..., whose title also references the novel.
- "Jekyll & Hyde 4eva" (2014), a song from Jessica Law's Languid Little Lies album, which reimagines the relationship between Jekyll & Hyde as a romantic one
- Jekyll + Hyde (2015), an album by the Zac Brown Band.
- "Me, Myself and Hyde" (2015) by Metalcore band Ice Nine Kills, from the album Every Trick in the Book.
- "Jekyll And Hyde" (2015) by Five Finger Death Punch, from the album Got Your Six.
- "Jekyll and Hyde" (2015) by Christian artist Jonathan Thulin, from the album Science Fiction.
- Mentioned in "Gretel" (2021) by Sodikken
- "The Whole World & You" (2022) by Chonny Jash
- "The Heart Acoustic" (2023) by Chonny Jash
- "The Ballad of Dr. Jekyll" (2023) and "The Mr. Hyde Jive" by Chonny Jash

== See also ==
- Hulk - subsequent comics and media
- Two-Face - subsequent comics and media
