= TGS =

TGS is a three-letter acronym which may refer to:

== Educational establishments ==
- Tadcaster Grammar School, North Yorkshire, England
- Takapuna Grammar School, Auckland, New Zealand
- The Geneva School, Winter Park, Florida
- Thetford Grammar School, Norfolk, England
- Think Global School, New York City, United States
- The Graduate School at Northwestern University. Illinois
- Tiffin Girls' School, Kingston upon Thames, England
- Tonbridge Grammar School, Tonbridge, England
- Toowoomba Grammar School, Toowoomba, Australia
- Tottenham Grammar School, London, England
- Townsville Grammar School, Townsville, Australia
- Trinity Grammar School, Melbourne, Australia
- Trinity Grammar School, Sydney, Australia

== Companies ==
- TGS Management, American quantitative hedge fund
- Transportadora de Gas del Sur, a Southern Natural Gas Transportation Company in Argentina
- TGS-NOPEC Geophysical Company, a Norwegian geoscience data, software and service provider
- Turkish Ground Services, Ground Handling subsidiary of Turkish Airlines

== Computing ==
- The Great Giana Sisters

== Media ==
- Teen Girl Squad, a subcartoon from the Homestar Runner website cartoons
- Tokyo Game Show, a video game trade show held in Tokyo
- Taipei Game Show, a video game trade show held in Taipei
- Toulouse Game Show, a video game trade show held in Toulouse, France
- The Gathering Storm (novel), by Robert Jordan, of the Wheel of Time series
- The Gamer Studio, a video gaming website.
- The Girlie Show (fictional show), a fictional show in the television series 30 Rock
- The Greatest Showman, a 2017 musical film
- The Glass Scientists, an independent webcomic

== Music ==
- The Glorious Sons, a Canadian rock band
- Tokyo Girls' Style, a Japanese girl group

== Places ==
- Tigaraksa railway station, a railway station in Tangerang Regency, Banten, Indonesia

== Science ==
- Triglycine sulfate, a material used in infrared sensors
- Transcriptional gene silencing, a type of gene expression regulator
