= John Larry Kelly Jr. =

American scientist (1923–1965)

- Born: December 26, 1923; Corsicana, Texas, U.S.
- Died: March 18, 1965 (aged 41); Manhattan, New York, U.S.
- Occupation: Scientist

John Larry Kelly Jr. (December 26, 1923 – March 18, 1965), was an American scientist who worked at Bell Labs. From a "system he'd developed to analyze information transmitted over networks," from Claude Shannon's earlier work on information theory, he is best known for his 1956 work in creating the Kelly criterion formula. With notable volatility in its sequence of outcomes, the Kelly criterion can be used to estimate what proportion of wealth to risk in a sequence of positive expected value bets to maximize the rate of return.

== Early life ==
He was born in Corsicana, Texas. He spent four years in the US Navy as a pilot during World War II before entering the University of Texas at Austin. He graduated with a PhD in physics in 1953.

== Speech synthesis: Enter Hal 9000 ==
In 1961, Kelly and colleagues Carol Lochbaum and Lou Gerstman created one of the most famous moments in the history of Bell Telephone Laboratories by using an IBM 7090 computer to synthesize speech. A demonstration by Kelly and Gerstman took place on May 10, 1961, at a meeting in Philadelphia of the Acoustical Society of America where a reporter noted that "A machine that talks— and sings— stole the show today as the old Bellevue Stratford vibrated with the speed of sound. The new gadget, a modified mechanical brain, recited passages from Shakespeare and sang musical selections in response to card-punched symbols, which were fed to it." Their voice recorder synthesizer vocoder recreated the song Daisy Bell, with musical accompaniment from Max Mathews. Arthur C. Clarke of 2001: A Space Odyssey fame visited his friend and colleague John Pierce at the Bell Labs Murray Hill facility and heard this remarkable speech synthesis demonstration. Clarke was so impressed that he adapted it to the climactic scene of his novel and screenplay for 2001: A Space Odyssey, when the HAL 9000 computer sings the same song as it is being disabled by astronaut Dave Bowman.

== The Las Vegas connection: Information theory and its applications to Game theory ==
John Kelly was an associate of Claude Shannon at Bell Labs. Together they developed a Game theory type method based on the principles of information theory developed by Shannon. It is reported that Shannon and his wife Betty went to Las Vegas with M.I.T. mathematician Ed Thorp, and made very successful forays in roulette and blackjack using this method, later called the Kelly criterion, making a fortune as detailed in the book Fortune's Formula by William Poundstone and corroborated by the writings of Elwyn Berlekamp, Kelly's research assistant in 1960 and 1962. Shannon and Thorp also applied the same theory to the stock market with even better results.

Over the decades, John Kelly's scientific formula has become a part of mainstream investment theory and the most prominent users, well-known and successful billionaire investors Warren Buffett, Bill Gross and Jim Simons use Kelly methods. Warren Buffett met Thorp the first time in 1968. It's said that Buffett uses a form of the Kelly criterion in deciding how much money to put into various holdings. Mathematician and game theorist Elwyn Berlekamp, once an assistant to Kelly at Bell Labs, had applied the same logical algorithm for Axcom Trading Advisors, an alternative investment management company that he led after acquiring most of the equity of the co-founder and prior leader, mathematician James Ax. Axcom was the outsourced manager for Renaissance Technologies Corp hedge fund flagship, the Medallion Fund. In 1990, Axcom was acquired by its part-owner, fellow mathematician and founder of Renaissance, Jim Simons.

== Death ==
A heavy smoker who could go through six packs of cigarettes a day, Kelly died of a stroke on a Manhattan sidewalk at the age of 41 on March 18, 1965.
