= David Gelbaum =

American businessman

David Gelbaum (c. 1950 - September 2018) was an American businessman and primarily green technology investor and environmental philanthropist.

Beginning in 2002, he invested up to $500 million in clean-tech companies through his Quercus Trust, with a portfolio of businesses involved in nearly every aspect of the emerging green economy, be it renewable energy, smart electric grids, sustainable agriculture, electric cars or biological remediation of oil spills. He was CEO and chairman of the Board of Entech Solar, a company he co-founded with Mark O'Neill.

== Career ==
Gelbaum was born and raised in Minneapolis, Minnesota, the second of four sons. His grandfather, Abraham, was a Ukrainian Jewish immigrant to the U.S. prior to World War I. He studied at University of California, Berkeley and Humboldt State University in Northern California before graduating with a B.A. in mathematics from University of California, Irvine. After graduating, he worked for a math professor, Edward O. Thorp, whose theories led to the establishment of what became Princeton Newport Partners, one of the first investment firms to use mathematical formulas to price stocks and derivatives. Princeton Newport Partners collapsed in 1989, following the indictment of five executives in connection with a scheme to create illegal tax losses. Mr. Thorp and Mr. Gelbaum were not implicated, and an appellate court later overturned the other executives' convictions. The same year, Gelbaum moved to TGS Management, working in a similar capacity until 2002.

His investment focus was on the environmental technology and renewable energy industries having served on various public company boards in these industries, including the boards of Solar Enertech Corp., ThermoEnergy Corporation, Clean Power Technologies, Graphene Energy, Advanced Hydro, Inc., Gravity Power, Aerofarms, and Energy Focus, Inc.

== Philanthropy ==
Gelbaum gave $200 million to the Sierra Club and $250 million to The Wildlands Conservancy, a land trust he co-founded that has acquired and preserved 1,200 square miles of land in California, including more than a half million acres of the Mojave Desert. He was responsible for the Sierra Club reversing its stance on immigration. He notably gave $93 million to the American Civil Liberties Union. Some of his biggest donations, around $250 million, has gone to aid American veterans of the wars in Iraq and Afghanistan through a charity he founded, the Iraq Afghanistan Deployment Impact Fund (IADIF).

He signed The Giving Pledge in 2013.

It was revealed in a Bloomberg exposé that Gelbaum, along with two other partners of investment firm TGS Management, had quietly given over $13 billion to charitable causes over the previous two decades, using a web of trusts and private companies to hide their identities.
