= Gelbaum =

Gelbaum is a surname. Notable people with the surname include:

- Bernard Russell Gelbaum (died 2005), American mathematician and academic administrator
- David Gelbaum (c. 1950–2018), American businessman and philanthropist
