= Howard Elton Lacey =

American mathematician (1937–2013)

Howard Elton Lacey (February 9, 1937 in Leakey, Texas – June 21, 2013) was an American mathematician who studied analysis.

After beginning his undergraduate studies at Texas A&M University, Lacey graduated from Abilene Christian University with a bachelor's degree in mathematics in 1959 and a master's degree in 1960. He completed his Ph.D. in 1963 New Mexico State University; his dissertation, Generalized Compact Operators in Locally Convex Spaces, was supervised by Edward Thorp. He returned to Abilene Christian University as an assistant professor, then in 1964 moved to the University of Texas at Austin. In 1980 he returned to Texas A&M University as a professor and chair of the mathematics department, a position he held for eleven years. He was Associate Dean of Science for one year and retired in 2002.

His specialty was Banach spaces. He also worked a lot with Polish scientists, including 1972/73 as a Fulbright Fellow at the Polish Academy of Sciences in Warsaw. He also worked in applied research at the White Sands Missile Range and at the Man Space Craft Center in Houston.

He had been married to Bonnie Brown since 1958, whom he met while he was on a summer job with the Army Corps of Engineers in Mississippi in 1957.
