= TGS Management =

American quantitative hedge fund

TGS Management Company, LLC
- Type: Private company
- Industry: Investment management
- Founded: 1989; 37 years ago
- Founders: Frederick Taylor; David Gelbaum; Andrew Shechtel
- Headquarters: Irvine, California, United States
- Products: Hedge funds Quantitative finance
- Website: www.tgsmc.com

TGS Management (TGS) is an American quantitative investment management firm founded in 1989 that has offices in Irvine, California and Princeton, New Jersey. It is known to maintain a very low profile.

== History ==
In 1989, TGS was founded by Frederick Taylor, David Gelbaum and Andrew Shechtel. The name of the firm comes from the starting letters of its three founders' surnames. The three of them previously worked at Princeton-Newport Partners (PNP), the world's first quantitative hedge fund that was founded in 1969 by Edward O. Thorp. In December 1988, PNP closed due to financial burdens imposed by a Racketeer Influenced and Corrupt Organizations Act investigation. The three founders of TGS were not accused of any wrongdoing and after they started TGS, they kept many former PNP employees and investors.

When TGS started trading, it pursued a form of statistical arbitrage and within a few years, it had made enough to return money to most of its outside investors. As it no longer needed to solicit outsiders for capital, the firm had more flexibility on pursuing its own investment strategies without needing to disclose them. In late 1990s, TGS briefly appeared in the news where it mounted an arbitrage campaign against several closed-end funds under the Scottish Investment Trust. At least one fund was forced to dissolve leading to the British media dubbing the firm a "secretive U.S. vulture fund". At the time TGS was operating under the name Sierra Trading Group, L.P.

The Real Deal reported that TGS has been acquiring land and office space in Irvine. As of February 2023, TGS owns more than 60 acres in Irvine.

TGS is known to be highly selective and hires individuals from quantitative backgrounds which include software engineers and PhDs. In 2023, The Wall Street Journal reported that TGS outbid Renaissance Technologies and Citadel LLC to hire an International Mathematical Olympiad gold medalist for $700,000 a year. In 2024, the tech compensation platform Levels reported that TGS Management was one of the top ranked employers for software engineer salaries, paying new graduates around $500,000 per year.

== Charity ==
Bloomberg News reported that the founders of TGS have been donating large sums of money away to charity anonymously. This was done by making use of many different subsidiaries under TGS to hide the source of funds. Donations include finding a cure for Huntington's disease.

== Political activities ==
In the early 2000s, TGS lobbied Congress on tax policy for three consecutive years. In 2001, it submitted a wish list of tax law changes to the United States House Committee on Ways and Means. It also wanted more generous tax treatment for donors who target rare diseases or contribute securities such as bonds to a private foundation.
