= Sheen T. Kassouf =

American economist (1928–2005)

- Born: August 11, 1928; New York, United States
- Died: August 10, 2005 (aged 76)
- Occupations: Economist, mathematician
- Spouse: Gloria Daher (m. 1957)

Sheen T. Kassouf (11 August 1928 – 10 August 2005) was an American economist from New York known for research in financial mathematics. In 1957 he married Gloria Daher in Brooklyn, New York. Kassouf received a PhD in economics from Columbia University (1965) and was later professor of economics at University of California Irvine. Together with Edward O. Thorp he co-authored the book Beat the Market in 1967.

== Publications ==
- Kassouf, S. T.; Thorp, E. O., Beat the Market: A Scientific Stock Market System, ISBN 0-394-42439-5 ()
- Access to all published works - UCI Department of Economics
