= Proebsting's paradox =

Gambling paradox

In probability theory, Proebsting's paradox is an argument that appears to show that the Kelly criterion can lead to ruin. Although it can be resolved mathematically, it raises some interesting issues about the practical application of Kelly, especially in investing. It was named and first discussed by Edward O. Thorp in 2008. The paradox was named for Todd Proebsting, its creator.

== Statement of the paradox ==
If a bet is equally likely to win or lose, and pays b times the stake for a win, the Kelly bet is:

$$f^{*} = \frac{b - 1}{2b}  \!$$

times wealth. For example, if a 50/50 bet pays 2 to 1, Kelly says to bet 25% of wealth. If a 50/50 bet pays 5 to 1, Kelly says to bet 40% of wealth.

Now suppose a gambler is offered 2 to 1 payout and bets 25%. What should he do if the payout on new bets changes to 5 to 1? He should choose f* to maximize:

$$0.5 \ln(1.5 + 5f^{*}) + 0.5 \ln(0.75 - f^{*}) \!$$

because if he wins he will have 1.5 (the 0.5 from winning the 25% bet at 2 to 1 odds) plus 5f*; and if he loses he must pay 0.25 from the first bet, and f* from the second. Taking the derivative with respect to f* and setting it to zero gives:

$$5(0.75 - f^{*}) = 1.5 + 5f^{*} \!$$

which can be rewritten:

$$2.25 = 10f^{*} \!$$

So f* = 0.225.

The paradox is that the total bet, 0.25 + 0.225 = 0.475, is larger than the 0.4 Kelly bet if the 5 to 1 odds are offered from the beginning. It is counterintuitive that you bet more when some of the bet is at unfavorable odds. Todd Proebsting emailed Ed Thorp asking about this.

Ed Thorp realized the idea could be extended to give the Kelly bettor a nonzero probability of being ruined. He showed that if a gambler is offered 2 to 1 odds, then 4 to 1, then 8 to 1 and so on (2^{n} to 1 for n = 1 to infinity) Kelly says to bet:

$$\frac{3^{n - 1}}{4^n} \!$$

each time. The sum of all these bets is 1. So a Kelly gambler has a 50% chance of losing his entire wealth.

In general, if a bettor makes the Kelly bet on a 50/50 proposition with a payout of b_{1}, and then is offered b_{2}, he will bet a total of:

$$f^{*} = \frac{b_2 - 1}{2b_2} + \frac{b_1 - 1}{4}\left(\frac{1}{f_1} - \frac{1}{f_2}\right). \!$$

The first term is what the bettor would bet if offered b_{2} initially. The second term is positive if f_{2} > f_{1}, meaning that if the payout improves, the Kelly bettor will bet more than he would if just offered the second payout, while if the payout gets worse he will bet less than he would if offered only the second payout.

== Practical application ==
Many bets have the feature that payoffs and probabilities can change before the outcome is determined. In sports betting for example, the line may change several times before the event is held, and news may come out (such as an injury or weather forecast) that changes the probability of an outcome. In investing, a stock originally bought at $20 per share might be available now at $10 or $30 or any other price. Some sports bettors try to make income from anticipating line changes rather than predicting event outcomes. Some traders concentrate on possible short-term price movements of a security rather than its long-term fundamental prospects.

A classic investing example is a trader who has exposure limits, say he is not allowed to have more than $1 million at risk in any one stock. That doesn't mean he cannot lose more than $1 million. If he buys $1 million of the stock at $20 and it goes to $10, he can buy another $500,000. If it then goes to $5, he can buy another $500,000. If it goes to zero, he can lose an infinite amount of money, despite never having more than $1 million at risk.

== Resolution ==
One easy way to dismiss the paradox is to note that Kelly assumes that probabilities do not change. A Kelly bettor who knows odds might change could factor this into a more complex Kelly bet. For example suppose a Kelly bettor is given a one-time opportunity to bet a 50/50 proposition at odds of 2 to 1. He knows there is a 50% chance that a second one-time opportunity will be offered at 5 to 1. Now he should maximize:

$$0.25 \ln(1 + 2f_1) + 0.25 \ln(1 - f_1) + 0.25 \ln(1 + 2f_1 + 5f_2) + 0.25 \ln(1 - f_1 - f_2) \!$$

with respect to both f_{1} and f_{2}. The answer turns out to be bet zero at 2 to 1, and wait for the chance of betting at 5 to 1, in which case you bet 40% of wealth. If the probability of being offered 5 to 1 odds is less than 50%, some amount between zero and 25% will be bet at 2 to 1. If the probability of being offered 5 to 1 odds is more than 50%, the Kelly bettor will actually make a negative bet at 2 to 1 odds (that is, bet on the 50/50 outcome with payout of 1/2 if he wins and paying 1 if he loses). In either case, his bet at 5 to 1 odds, if the opportunity is offered, is 40% minus 0.7 times his 2 to 1 bet.

What the paradox says, essentially, is that if a Kelly bettor has incorrect beliefs about what future bets may be offered, he can make suboptimal choices, and even go broke. The Kelly criterion is supposed to do better than any essentially different strategy in the long run and have zero chance of ruin, as long as the bettor knows the probabilities and payouts.

More light on the issues was shed by an independent consideration of the problem by Aaron Brown, also communicated to Ed Thorp by email. In this formulation, the assumption is the bettor first sells back the initial bet, then makes a new bet at the second payout. In this case his total bet is:

$$f^{*} = \frac{b_2 - 1}{2b_2} - \frac{b_1 - 1}{4}\left(\frac{1}{f_1} - \frac{1}{f_2}\right)\frac{f_2-1}{f_2+1} \!$$

which looks very similar to the formula above for the Proebsting formulation, except that the sign is reversed on the second term and it is multiplied by an additional term.

For example, given the original example of a 2 to 1 payout followed by a 5 to 1 payout, in this formulation the bettor first bets 25% of wealth at 2 to 1. When the 5 to 1 payout is offered, the bettor can sell back the original bet for a loss of 0.125. His 2 to 1 bet pays 0.5 if he wins and costs 0.25 if he loses. At the new 5 to 1 payout, he could get a bet that pays 0.625 if he wins and costs 0.125 if he loses, this is 0.125 better than his original bet in both states. Therefore his original bet now has a value of -0.125. Given his new wealth level of 0.875, his 40% bet (the Kelly amount for the 5 to 1 payout) is 0.35.

The two formulations are equivalent. In the original formulation, the bettor has 0.25 bet at 2 to 1 and 0.225 bet at 5 to 1. If he wins, he gets 2.625 and if he loses he has 0.525. In the second formulation, the bettor has 0.875 and 0.35 bet at 5 to 1. If he wins, he gets 2.625 and if he loses he has 0.525.

The second formulation makes clear that the change in behavior results from the mark-to-market loss the investor experiences when the new payout is offered. This is a natural way to think in finance, less natural to a gambler. In this interpretation, the infinite series of doubling payouts does not ruin the Kelly bettor by enticing him to overbet, it extracts all his wealth through changes beyond his control.
