= Dr. Jekyll and Mr. Hyde (1908 film) =

American silent horror film

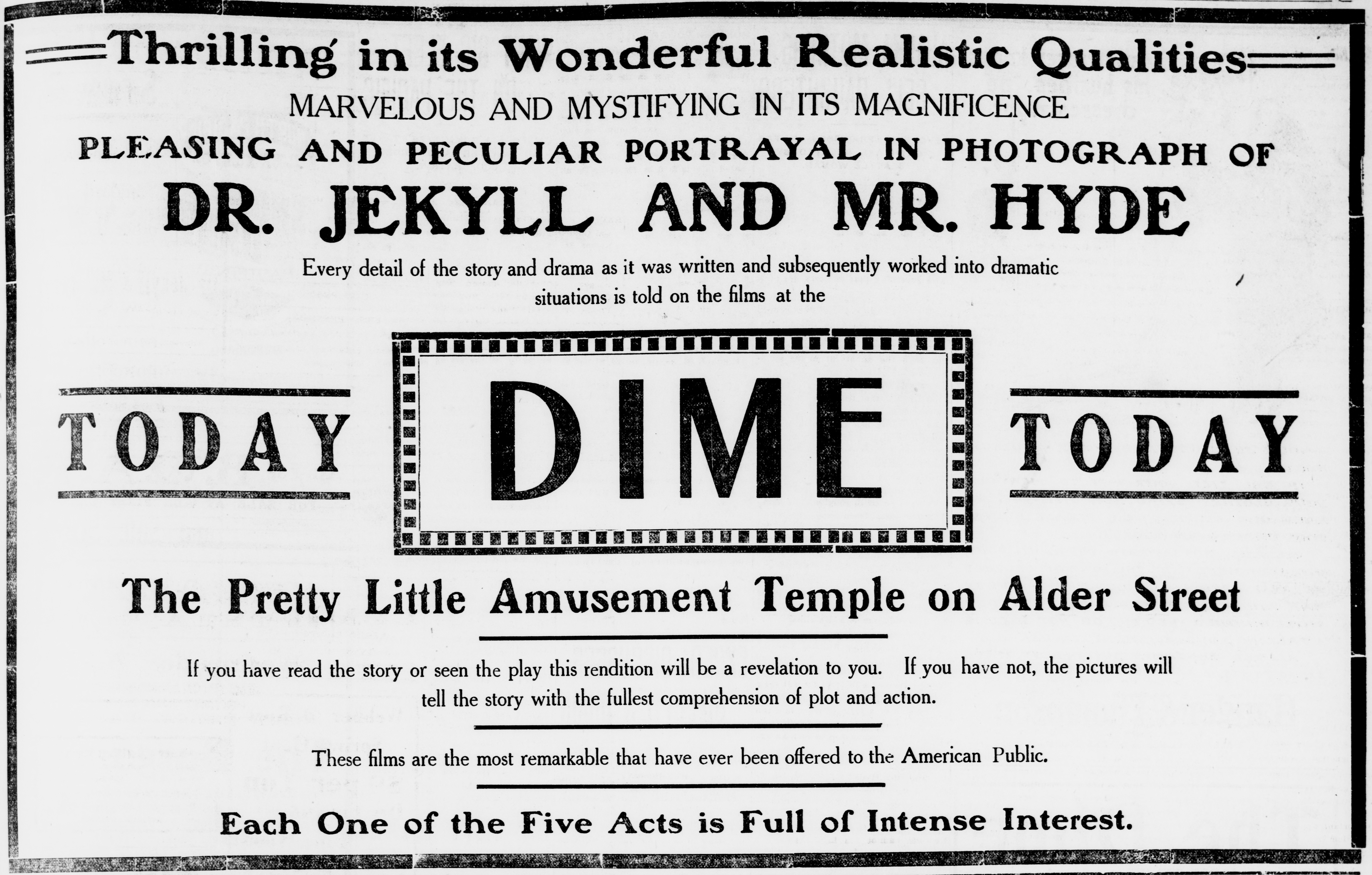
- Newspaper advertisement
- Directed by: Otis Turner (unconfirmed)
- Written by: George F. Fish; Luella Forepaugh
- Based on: Strange Case of Dr. Jekyll and Mr. Hyde; 1886 novella by Robert Louis Stevenson
- Produced by: William N. Selig
- Starring: Hobart Bosworth; Betty Harte
- Cinematography: Karl Struss
- Edited by: William Shea
- Distributed by: Selig Polyscope Company
- Release date: March 7, 1908
- Running time: 16 mins. (one reel)
- Country: United States
- Languages: Silent film (English intertitles)

Dr. Jekyll and Mr. Hyde is a 1908 silent horror film starring Hobart Bosworth, and Betty Harte in her film debut. Directed by Otis Turner and produced by William N. Selig, this was the first film adaptation of Robert Louis Stevenson's 1886 novel Strange Case of Dr Jekyll and Mr Hyde. The screenplay was actually adapted by George F. Fish and Luella Forepaugh from their own 1897 four act stage play derived from the novel, causing a number of plot differences with the original source. Despite Stevenson's protests, this film became the model which influenced all the later film adaptations that were to come.

Roy Kinnard states it is also considered to be the first American horror film. There are no known extant copies of the film.

== Plot ==
The film begins with the raising of a stage curtain. Dr. Jekyll vows his undying love for Alice, a vicar's daughter, in her spacious garden. Suddenly, seized by his addiction to the chemical formula, Jekyll begins to convulse and distort himself into the evil Mr. Hyde. He savagely attacks Alice, and when her father tries to intervene, Mr. Hyde takes great delight in slaughtering him. While in his lawyer's office, Dr. Jekyll sees visions of himself being executed for his crime.

Hyde later visits a friend Dr. Lanyon to ask him to procure some chemicals he needs, and after drinking the potion, he transforms back into Jekyll right before the doctor's eyes. Later in his lab, Jekyll transforms back into Mr. Hyde again, but haunted by visions of the gallows, he takes a fatal dose of poison, killing both of his identities simultaneously. In true theatrical tradition, the curtain then closes.

== Cast ==
- Hobart Bosworth as Dr. Jekyll / Mr. Hyde
- Betty Harte

== Production ==
The screenplay was adapted by George F. Fish and Luella Forepaugh based on their own 1897 four act stage play, which was condensed into a 16-minute long film. Selig thought the screenplay he used was based directly on Stevenson's novel, not realizing it had been adapted from Fish and Forepaugh's stage play instead, causing some plot differences. Selig erroneously commented upon its release that his film was "presented in strict accordance with the original book....involving each detail of pose, gesture and expression.....executed by persons of indisputed dramatic ability."

Despite its brevity, the film was also organized into four acts, just like the play. Each act consisted of a single scene, and the acts were separated onscreen by the rising and falling of a curtain. Selig produced a number of films from this period in much the same way, as if a static camera had simply photographed a stage play that was in progress.

The film was released seven months after the death of stage actor Richard Mansfield. (Mansfield had created the part of Jekyll/Hyde in the theater in Dr. Jekyll and Mr. Hyde, the first stage adaptation written by Thomas Russell Sullivan, beginning in 1887.)

To cash in on the popularity of their 1908 film, the Selig Polyscope company released another version of the Jekyll-Hyde story (running 7 minutes) in 1909 called A Modern Dr. Jekyll, which updated the story to a contemporary setting. Jekyll's formula was depicted as more of a magic potion in that film, and even transforms him into a woman in one scene. The 1909 film is also considered lost.

== Critiques ==
Jekyll's transformation into Hyde was filmed all in one continuous shot without the use of any special effects. Bosworth simply contorted his body into a hunchbacked position and slid part of the wig he was wearing lower down over his forehead. Critics were enthusiastic, giving Bosworth special mention: "The change is displayed with a dramatic ability almost beyond comprehension".

Motion Picture World opined "The successful reproduction of this well-known drama surpassed our expectations".
