= James Reese (author) =

American novelist

- Born: November 21, 1964 (age 61); Patchogue, New York, U.S.
- Occupation: Novelist
- Website: jamesreesebooks.com

James Reese is American author born on November 21, 1964, in Patchogue, New York. He attended the University of Notre Dame, and has an MA in Theatre from SUNY Stony Brook. Having lived in New Orleans and Key West, Florida, Reese now divides his time between St. Petersburg, Florida, and Paris, France.

Reese's first novel, The Book of Shadows (William Morrow and Company, 2002), appeared on the extended New York Times bestseller list. It tells the story of Herculine, a French hermaphrodite born on the Breton coast in 1806. Reese styled the book in accord with the conventions of both the nineteenth-century novel and Gothic fiction. Indeed, Reese cites the early Gothicists as his prime models, and The Book of Shadows incorporates supernatural elements with a mix of history and horror.

Herculine's story continued in The Book of Spirits (Wm. Morrow & Co., 2004) and concluded in The Witchery (Wm. Morrow & Co., 2006). In the former novel, Herculine arrives in Richmond, Virginia, in the years prior to the American Civil War and befriends a young Edgar Allan Poe and his sister, Rosalie. Events soon take Herculine to Havana, Cuba, and the Florida Keys, where The Witchery brings the Herculine Trilogy to a close.

HarperCollins released Reese's The Dracula Dossier in October, 2008. Modeled on Bram Stoker’s Dracula, the novel imagines an encounter between Stoker himself and Francis J. Tumblety, a real-life suspect in the Jack the Ripper murders.

Reese's books have been published in Russian, Romanian, Turkish, Dutch, Polish, and Spanish.

== Bibliography ==
- The Book of Shadows (2002)
- The Book of Spirits (2004)
- The Witchery (2006)
- The Dracula Dossier (2008)
- The Strange Case of Doctor Jekyll and Mademoiselle Odile (YA) (2012)
- TBA (2013)
