= Princeton Newport Partners =

Early alternative investment management company

Convertible Hedge Associates (CHA) was an early alternative investment management company founded by Edward O. Thorp and a partner, Jay Regan, in November 1969. Based in Long Beach, California, CHA was said by Thorp to have been the first market-neutral hedge fund. In 1974 it was renamed as Princeton/Newport Partners.

Princeton Newport Partners (PNP), founded in 1974, was stated by its founder, mathematics professor Edward O. Thorp, to be the world's first market neutral hedge fund. The company was a pioneer in quantitative trading techniques, profiting from mispricings in derivatives, and later statistical arbitrage, which involved trading a large number of stocks for short-term returns. PNP achieved an annualized rate of return of 20 percent after fees for over two decades, without a single down quarter, until becoming embroiled in the junk bond schemes of Michael Milken's circle at Drexel Burnham Lambert. Thorp and other principals at PNP were eventually cleared of wrongdoing, but the financial burdens imposed by the ensuing Racketeer Influenced and Corrupt Organizations Act investigation forced PNP to liquidate. His circle of associates later regrouped as TGS Management, with focus on statistical arbitrage.
