= The Glass Scientists =

Young adult webcomic

- Author: Sage Cotugno
- Illustrator(s): Sage Cotugno, Julia Elliott, Lucy Xue, Tiina Purin
- Website: https://www.theglassscientists.com
- Launch date: 2015
- Publisher(s): Self-published online; Penguin Random House in-print

The Glass Scientists is a young adult webcomic by Sage Cotugno (published as S.H. Cotugno), published both in-print and online. Set in the Victorian era, it is inspired by the Gothic novel Strange Case of Dr. Jekyll and Mr. Hyde. The comic follows a world after the infamous Dr. Frankenstein's death, as a group of "rogue scientists" and socialite Jekyll tries to pull themselves out of disrepute.

== Plot ==
The comic is set in London in the Victorian era filled with magic and supernatural monsters. Thirty years since the death of the infamous Dr. Frankenstein, the citizens are still fearful of the supernatural, threatening the scientists who reside in London. One socialite and scientist Henry Jekyll has founded an organization called Society for Arcane Science, where a group of "rogue scientists" could continue their work in secret. They and Jekyll hope to improve their reputation and allow arcane science to flourish under public eye. However, after a failed experiment on himself, Jekyll has come to live in the same body with a chaotic version of himself, who calls himself Hyde. Hyde really, really wants to go to this underground market known as the Blackfog Bazaar, and convinced Jekyll to let him go.

== Publication ==
After first releasing the comic online in 2015, Sage Cotugno writes and draws the series. They are a California Institute of the Arts graduate with a Bachelor of Fine Arts in character animation. In a 2022 auction, publisher Penguin Random House bought the right to publish the comic as a graphic novel. The publisher's Razorbill division released the first volume's print edition in October 3, 2023, edited by Chris Hernandez. The print edition of the second volume was released on September 24, 2024, this time by G. P. Putnam's Sons, an imprint of Penguin Random House. The final third volume is set to release on December 2, 2025.

== Reception ==
A critic in Kirkus Reviews said that the first volume makes "interesting narrative promises" to be fulfilled by the next volume. The School Library Journal commented the series combines historical and science fiction, and its themes relate to TJ Klune's book The House in the Cerulean Sea. Gizmodo praised the dialogue, saying that while it is "charming", it also has the "undertone of nasty things left unspoken". Literary magazine Booklist said "the gothic atmosphere is in fun contrast to the cartoonish figures and action."

Kirkus Reviews praised the second volume for its handling of "LGBTQ+ friendships and romance, classism, and subversion of the patriarchy".
