= Edward O. Thorp =

American mathematician

- Born: August 14, 1932 (age 94); Chicago, Illinois, U.S.
- Education: University of California, Los Angeles
- Scientific career
- Fields: Probability theory, Linear operators
- Workplaces: UC Irvine, New Mexico State University, MIT
- Thesis: Compact Linear Operators in Normed Spaces (1958)
- Doctoral advisor: Angus E. Taylor
- Doctoral students: Howard Elton Lacey

Edward Oakley Thorp (born August 14, 1932) is an American mathematics professor, author, hedge fund manager, and blackjack researcher. He pioneered the modern applications of probability theory, including the harnessing of very small correlations for reliable financial gain.

Thorp is the author of Beat the Dealer, which mathematically proved that the house advantage in blackjack could be overcome by card counting. He also developed and applied effective hedge fund techniques in the financial markets, and collaborated with Claude Shannon in creating the first wearable computer.

Thorp received his Ph.D. in mathematics from the University of California, Los Angeles in 1958, and worked at the Massachusetts Institute of Technology (MIT) from 1959 to 1961. He was a professor of mathematics from 1961 to 1965 at New Mexico State University. He then joined the University of California, Irvine where he was a professor of mathematics from 1965 to 1977 and a professor of mathematics and finance from 1977 to 1982.

In a 1973 paper on the card game faro, Thorp proposed a simple model of human shuffling in which the deck is cut into two equal halves and, for each position, the two cards from the halves are riffled together in either order with equal probability, independently of the other pairs. This model is now known as the Thorp shuffle, and Ben Morris, Phillip Rogaway and Till Stegers later used it as the basis of a scheme for enciphering messages on small domains.

== Background ==
Thorp was born in Chicago, but moved to southern California in his childhood. He had an early aptitude for science and often tinkered with experiments of his own creation. He was one of the youngest amateur radio operators when he was certified at age 12. Thorp went on to win scholarships by excelling in chemistry and physics competitions (one instance led him to meet President Truman), ultimately choosing to attend UC Berkeley for his undergraduate degree. However, he transferred to UCLA after one year, majoring in physics. This was eventually followed by a PhD in mathematics at UCLA. He met his future wife Vivian during his first year at UCLA. They married in January 1956.

== Computer-aided research in blackjack ==
Thorp used the IBM 704 as a research tool in order to investigate the probabilities of winning while developing his blackjack game theory, which was based on the Kelly criterion, which he learned about from the 1956 paper by Kelly. He learned Fortran in order to program the equations needed for his theoretical research model on the probabilities of winning at blackjack. Thorp analyzed the game of blackjack to a great extent this way, while devising card counting schemes with the aid of the IBM 704 in order to improve his odds, especially near the end of a card deck that is not being reshuffled after every deal.

=== Applied research in casinos ===
Thorp decided to test his theory in practice in Reno, Lake Tahoe, and Las Vegas, Nevada. Thorp started his applied research using $10,000, with Manny Kimmel, a wealthy professional gambler and former bookmaker, providing the venture capital. First they visited Reno and Lake Tahoe establishments where they tested Thorp's theory at the local blackjack tables. The experimental results proved successful and his theory was verified since he won $11,000 in a single weekend. As a countermeasure to his methods, casinos now shuffle long before the end of the deck is reached. During his Las Vegas casino visits Thorp frequently used disguises such as wraparound glasses and false beards. In addition to the blackjack activities, Thorp had assembled a baccarat team which was also winning.

News quickly spread throughout the gambling community, which was eager for new methods of winning, while Thorp became an instant celebrity among blackjack aficionados. Due to the great demand generated about disseminating his research results to a wider gambling audience, he wrote the book Beat the Dealer in 1962 (substantially updated in 1966), widely considered the original guide to card counting, which sold over 700,000 copies, a huge number for a specialty title which earned it a place in the New York Times bestseller list, much to the chagrin of Kimmel whose identity was thinly disguised in the book as Mr. X.

Thorp's blackjack research is one of the very few examples where results from such research reached the public directly, completely bypassing the usual academic peer review process cycle. He has also stated that he considered the whole experiment an academic exercise.

In addition, Thorp, while a professor of mathematics at MIT, met Claude Shannon, and took him and his wife Betty Shannon as partners on weekend forays to Las Vegas to play roulette and blackjack, at which Thorp was very successful. His team's roulette play was the first instance of using a wearable computer in a casino — something which is now illegal, as of May 30, 1985, when the Nevada devices law came into effect as an emergency measure targeting blackjack and roulette devices. The wearable computer was co-developed with Claude Shannon between 1960 and 1961. It relied on a pair of operators, where one would watch the wheel and use his toe to input the cadence of the wheel, and the other would receive a message in the form of musical tones through a hidden earpiece. By betting on groups of neighboring numbers on the wheel they could gain a sufficient advantage to make a profit. The final operating version of the device was tested in Shannon's home lab at his basement in June 1961. Based on his achievements, Thorp was an inaugural member of the Blackjack Hall of Fame.

He also devised the "Thorp count", a method for calculating the likelihood of winning in certain endgame positions in backgammon.

Edward O. Thorp's Real Blackjack was published by Villa Crespo Software in 1990.

== Stock market ==
Since the late 1960s, Thorp has used his knowledge of probability and statistics in the stock market by discovering and exploiting a number of pricing anomalies in the securities markets and has made a significant fortune. Thorp's first hedge fund was Princeton/Newport Partners from 1969 to 1989 based on Market Neutral Derivatives Hedging. His second hedge fund was called Ridgeline Partners and it ran from August 1994 through September 2002 based on statistical arbitrage. This hedge fund was closed largely because the return of the statistical arbitrage strategies had been low since 2002. He is currently the President of Edward O. Thorp & Associates, based in Newport Beach, California. In May 1998, Thorp reported that his personal investments yielded an annualized 20 percent rate of return averaged over 28.5 years.

Thorp wrote many articles about option pricing, Kelly criterion, statistical arbitrage strategies (6-parts series), and inefficient markets.

In 1991, Thorp was an early skeptic of Bernie Madoff's supposedly stellar investing returns which were proved to be fraudulent in 2008.

== Bibliography ==
- Edward Thorp, (1964) Beat the Dealer: A Winning Strategy for the Game of Twenty-One, ISBN 0-394-70310-3
- Edward O. Thorp, Sheen T. Kassouf, (1967) Beat the Market: A Scientific Stock Market System, ISBN 0-394-42439-5 (online pdf, retrieved 22 Nov 2017)
- Edward O. Thorp, Elementary Probability, 1977, ISBN 0-88275-389-4
- Edward O. Thorp, The Mathematics of Gambling, 1984, ISBN 0-89746-019-7 (online version part 1, part 2, part 3, part 4)
- The Kelly Capital Growth Investment Criterion: Theory and Practice (World Scientific Handbook in Financial Economic Series), ISBN 978-9814293495, February 10, 2011 by Leonard C. MacLean (Editor), Edward O. Thorp (Editor), William T. Ziemba (Editor)
- (Autobiography) Edward O. Thorp, (2017) A Man for All Markets: From Las Vegas to Wall Street, How I Beat the Dealer and the Market
- William Poundstone (2005) Fortune's Formula: The Untold Story of the Scientific Betting System That Beat the Casinos and Wall Street

== See also ==
- Black–Scholes
- Four Horsemen of the Apocalypse - who derived Basic strategy for blackjack
- Gaming mathematics
- Kelly criterion
- Proebsting's paradox
- Richard A. Epstein

== Sources ==
- Morris, Ben; Rogaway, Phillip; Stegers, Till (2018). "Deterministic Encryption with the Thorp Shuffle". Journal of Cryptology. 31 (2): 521–536. doi:10.1007/s00145-017-9262-z.
- Patterson, Scott D., The Quants: How a New Breed of Math Whizzes Conquered Wall Street and Nearly Destroyed It, Crown Business, 352 pages, 2010. ISBN 0-307-45337-5 via Patterson and Thorp interview on Fresh Air, February 1, 2010, including excerpt "Chapter 2: The Godfather: Ed Thorp"
- Thorp, Edward O. (December 1973). "Nonrandom Shuffling with Applications to the Game of Faro". Journal of the American Statistical Association. 68 (344): 842–847. doi:10.1080/01621459.1973.10481434.
