= Thelma (disambiguation) =

Thelma is a female given name.

Thelma may also refer to:

== Arts and entertainment ==
- Thelma (novel), an 1887 novel by Marie Corelli
- Thelma the Unicorn, a 2015 children's book series by Aaron Blabey
  - Thelma the Unicorn, a 2024 animated film adaptation based on the books of the same name
- Thelma (1910 film), an adaptation of Corelli's novel
- Thelma (1918 film), an adaptation of Corelli's novel
- Thelma (1922 film), an American silent film
- Thelma (2011 film), a Filipino film
- Thelma (2017 film), a Norwegian film directed by Joachim Trier
- Thelma (2024 film), an American film directed by Josh Margolin
- Thelma (opera), by Samuel Coleridge-Taylor
- "Thelma", a song by John Lee Hooker
- Thelma Records, Detroit, Michigan record label 1962-66

== Species ==
- Elachista thelma, a moth of family Elachistidae
- Syrnola thelma, a sea snail of family Pyramidellidae
- Trissodoris thelma, a moth of family Cosmopterigidae

== Other uses ==
- Tropical Storm Thelma (disambiguation), various storms, cyclones and typhoons
- Thelma, Kentucky, United States, an unincorporated community
- B K Thelma (born 1955), Indian biologist/geneticist
