= A Romance of Two Worlds =

1886 novel by Marie Corelli

- Author: Marie Corelli
- Publisher: Bentley
- Publication date: 1886
- Followed by: Ardath

A Romance of Two Worlds was Marie Corelli's first novel, published in 1886. It referenced the contemporary debate between creationism and evolution, as well as supernatural themes, overlaid with elements of science fiction. The book was an immediate commercial success, establishing Corelli as one of the most popular writers of the time, though like much of her subsequent work, it was negatively received by critics.

== Synopsis ==
A young improvisational musician in London experiences a debilitating depression. Her doctor is unable to help her and sends her off on a holiday where she meets a mystical character by the name of Raffello Cellini, an Italian painter who has rediscovered the secret of vivid, lightfast pigments. Cellini offers her a strange potion which immediately puts her into a tranquil slumber, in which she experiences divine visions, which causes her symptoms of neurasthenia to somewhat abate. Cellini directs her to take up residence in Paris under the tutelage of Heliobas, a Chaldean Christian and "electric physician" who performs miraculous feats including prophecy, telepathy and animal magnetism. He introduces her to his sister Zara, a sculptor, with whom she enjoys a close friendship, and to Prince Ivan, a rakish figure who pursues an unrequited attraction to Zara. She witnesses Ivan attempt to assault Zara, who repels him with electric power similar to that of an electric eel. From this, the protagonist gleans that the arts practised by Heliobas enable the strengthening of a human organ similar to a voltaic pile, granting health and longevity as well as other powers. Heliobas prescribes plant remedies to the heroine, which cause her health to steadily improve and enable her to cultivate these supernatural powers. Under the influence of a psychedelic draught, she meets her unnamed guardian angel, who whisks her through infinite solar systems faster than a shooting star while human spirits fly by like gossamer silk. The spirits share with her the secrets of the universe and the nature of Christ, as well as a premonition that Heliobas's own salvation is in danger. When she awakes, Heliobas bestows upon her his treatise on the "Electric Principle of Christianity", which is reprinted in the book, as well as a document on the stewardship of her newfound electric powers. She witnesses Zara's death by lightning, which prompts Ivan to challenge Heliobas to a duel, and persuades Heliobas not to kill Ivan. Heliobas leaves Paris, assuring the heroine that they will meet again. In the conclusion, the heroine reflects on what she has learned from Heliobas since the events of the story, asserting a historical basis for crystal healing and other miracles. She states that she expects her story to be received as a fiction, but reaffirms her belief that the universe is electric in nature.

== Composition and publication ==
Corelli composed A Romance of Two Worlds in 1885. She sent the story to publisher George Bentley. Bentley took an interest in the book after receiving highly divided reports from readers, including a very negative one from novelist Hall Caine—an act that began a lifelong feud between Caine and Corelli. Suspecting that the novel might have commercial appeal, Bentley agreed to publish it, and Corelli signed a contract on 5 September 1885, earning 40 pounds immediately, with an additional 30 pounds to be paid if sales reached 600 copies, and again if they reached 750.

Corelli initially titled the story Lifted Up, perhaps inspired by the 1883 shilling novelette Called Back, but changed it at Bentley's suggestion. The final title was suggested by Corelli's father, Charles Mackay.

Though it was most common at the time for novels to be published in three volumes, Corelli intended A Romance of Two Worlds to be published in only one. Ultimately, it was printed in either two or three volumes, (Note: Masters claims it was published in two volumes. Waller claims it was published in three volumes.) and became available for sale on 19 February 1886.

== Reception ==
The book was not well reviewed by critics, a circumstance which publisher George Bentley anticipated, writing to Corelli that "I think it will provoke much adverse criticism". A critic for The World wrote that "as a pure romance... the book is a tolerable thing enough. If the writer intends us to take it seriously—as her preface seems half to suggest—it is pure bosh." Another single-line review simply read "Miss Corelli would have been better advised had she embodied her ridiculous ideas in a sixpenny pamphlet." The Athenaeum gave measured praise, writing that "considered as a romance, pure and simple, it may entertain its readers not a little."

Despite this, the book was a success with the reading public, and within six months of publication, Corelli reported to Bentley that letters from appreciative readers were "pouring in every day". After twelve months, Bentley published a second edition in one volume as part of his "Favourite" series. This edition included a new introduction by Corelli, and an appendix with quotes from readers' letters. Oscar Wilde was among the book's fans, writing to Corelli, "I have read the book over again... you certainly tell of marvellous things in a marvellous way."

Her scripture, "The Electric Principle of Christianity", included in the novel, is presented as something factual and after the publication of the book generated a cult following, in which readers sought more information about her experience. Today, New Age devotees hail Corelli as "inspired".

== Themes ==
In A Romance of Two Worlds, Marie Corelli takes on an old argument between the creationists and the evolutionists. However, her insights are futuristic, including ideas about electricity, solar power, and the properties of the atom.

She explains in the introduction,

in this cultivated age a wall of skepticism and cynicism is gradually being built up by intellectual thinkers of every nation against all that treats of the Supernatural and Unseen, I am aware that my narration of the events I have recently experienced will be read with incredulity. At a time when the great empire of the Christian Religion is being assailed, or politely ignored by governments and public speakers and teachers, I realize to the fullest extent how daring is any attempt to prove, even by a plain history of strange occurrences happening to one's self, the actual existence of the Supernatural around us; and the absolute certainty of a future state of being, after the passage through that brief soul-torpor in which the body perishes, known to us as Death.

The book is suffused with Pantheism. She also argues that Christ did not come to us as a sacrifice because God is a creator of love and beauty and could not desire "a bleeding victim as sacrifice to appease His Anger [...]".

== Real-life inspirations ==
Many believe that the book is autobiographical, a belief which Corelli encouraged. One passage describing the main character's relationship with a female friend, Zara, has been identified as possibly inspired by Corelli's lifelong companion Bertha Vyver:

Zara and I became inseparables; we worked together, read together, and together every morning gave those finishing-touches to the ordering and arrangement of the household which are essentially feminine, and which not the wisest philosopher in all the world has been, or ever will be, able to accomplish successfully. We grew to love each other dearly, with that ungrudging, sympathizing, confiding friendship that is very rarely found between two women.

In several chapters Corelli hints that the character Heliobas may be the Count of St. Germain, although the Fraternitas Rosae Crucis identifies him as an Illuminati hierophant, Count A. di Guinotti. Heliobas appears in two other Corelli novels, Ardath and The Soul of Lilith.
