= Ardath =

Ardath may refer to:

== Aircraft ==
- Mantainer Ardath, an Australian non-rigid airship, flown in the 1970s

== Places ==
- Ardath, Missouri
- Ardath, Saskatchewan
- Ardath, Western Australia

== People ==
- Ardath Mayhar, American writer and poet
- Ardath Whynacht, Canadian feminist writer and researcher

== Literature ==
- Ardath (novel), an 1889 novel by Marie Corelli
