= Ardath, Missouri =

Extinct hamlet in Missouri, U.S.

Coordinates: 37°36′36″N 94°36′19″W

Ardath is an extinct town in Barton County, in the U.S. state of Missouri. The GNIS classifies it as a populated place.

A post office called Ardath was established in 1913, and closed in 1914. Ardath was the name of a novel by Marie Corelli.
