= Extraordinary Popular Delusions and the Madness of Crowds =

1841 book by Charles Mackay

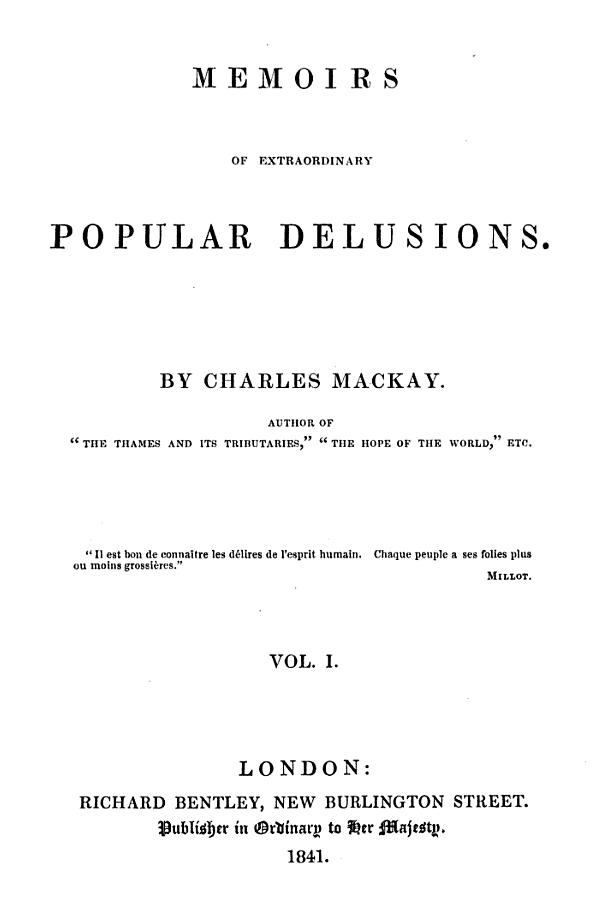
- Front page of the original 1841 edition
- Author: Charles Mackay
- Language: English
- Subjects: Crowd psychology, economic bubbles, history
- Publisher: Richard Bentley, London
- Publication date: 1841
- Publication place: United Kingdom
- Media type: Print
- Text: Extraordinary Popular Delusions and the Madness of Crowds at Wikisource

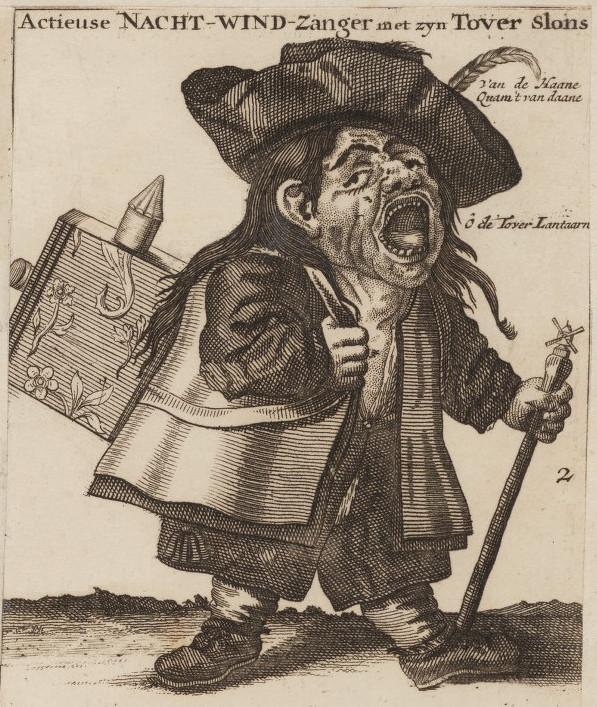
"Night wind hawkers" sold stock on the streets during the South Sea Bubble. (The Great Picture of Folly, 1720)

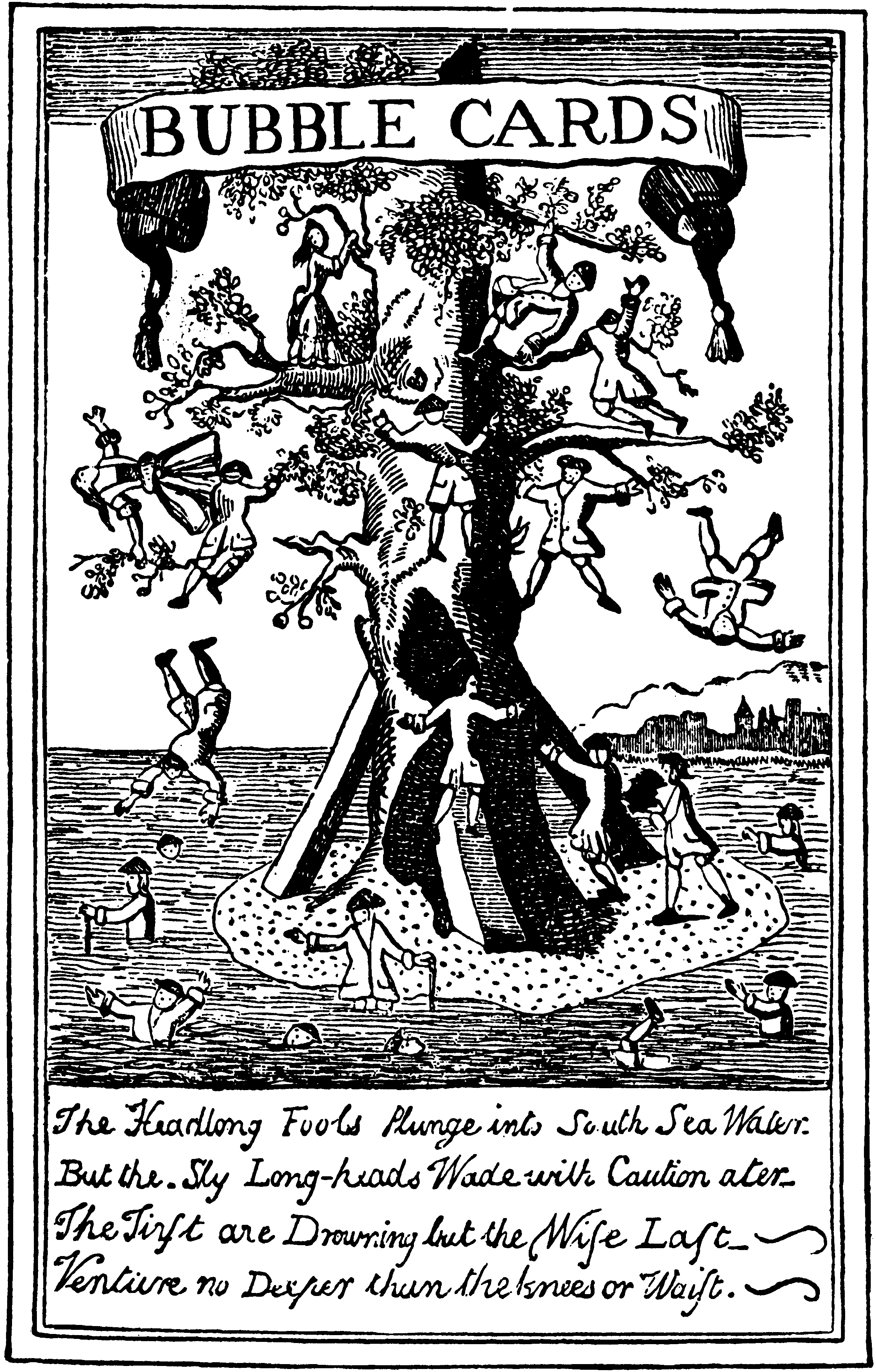
A satirical "Bubble card"

Extraordinary Popular Delusions and the Madness of Crowds is an early study of crowd psychology by Scottish journalist Charles Mackay, first published in 1841 under the title Memoirs of Extraordinary Popular Delusions. The book was published in three volumes: "National Delusions", "Peculiar Follies", and "Philosophical Delusions". A second edition appeared in 1852, reorganizing the three volumes into two and adding numerous engravings. Mackay was an accomplished teller of stories, though he wrote in a journalistic and somewhat sensational style.

The subjects of Mackay's debunking include alchemy, crusades, duels, economic bubbles, fortune-telling, haunted houses, the Drummer of Tedworth, the influence of politics and religion on the shapes of beards and hair, magnetisers (influence of imagination in curing disease), murder through poisoning, prophecies, popular admiration of great thieves, popular follies of great cities, and relics. Present-day writers on economics, such as Michael Lewis and Andrew Tobias, laud the three chapters on economic bubbles.

In later editions, Mackay added a footnote referencing the Railway Mania of the 1840s as another "popular delusion" which was at least as important as the South Sea Bubble. In the 21st century, the mathematician Andrew Odlyzko pointed out, in a published lecture, that Mackay himself played a role in this economic bubble; as a leader writer in The Glasgow Argus, Mackay wrote on 2 October 1845: "There is no reason whatever to fear a crash".

== Volume I: National Delusions ==
=== Economic bubbles ===
The first volume begins with a discussion of three economic bubbles, or financial manias: the South Sea Company bubble of 1711–1720, the Mississippi Company bubble of 1719–1720, and the Dutch tulip mania of the early seventeenth century. According to Mackay, during this bubble, speculators from all walks of life bought and sold tulip bulbs and had even declared futures contracts on them. Allegedly, some tulip bulb varieties briefly became the most expensive objects in the world during 1637. Mackay's accounts are enlivened by colorful, comedic anecdotes, such as the Parisian hunchback who supposedly profited by renting out his hump as a writing desk during the height of the mania surrounding the Mississippi Company.

Two modern researchers, Peter Garber and Anne Goldgar, independently conclude that Mackay greatly exaggerated the scale and effects of the Tulip bubble, and Mike Dash, in his modern popular history of the alleged bubble, notes that he believes the importance and extent of the tulip mania were overstated.

=== Chapters ===
- The Mississippi Scheme
- The South Sea Bubble
- The Tulip Mania
- Relics
- Modern Prophecies
- Popular Admiration for Great Thieves (cf hybristophilia)
- Influence of Politics and Religion on the Hair and Beard
- Duels and Ordeals
- The Love of the Marvellous and the Disbelief of the True
- Popular Follies in Great Cities
- Old Price Riots
- The Thugs, or Phansigars

== Volume II: Peculiar Follies ==
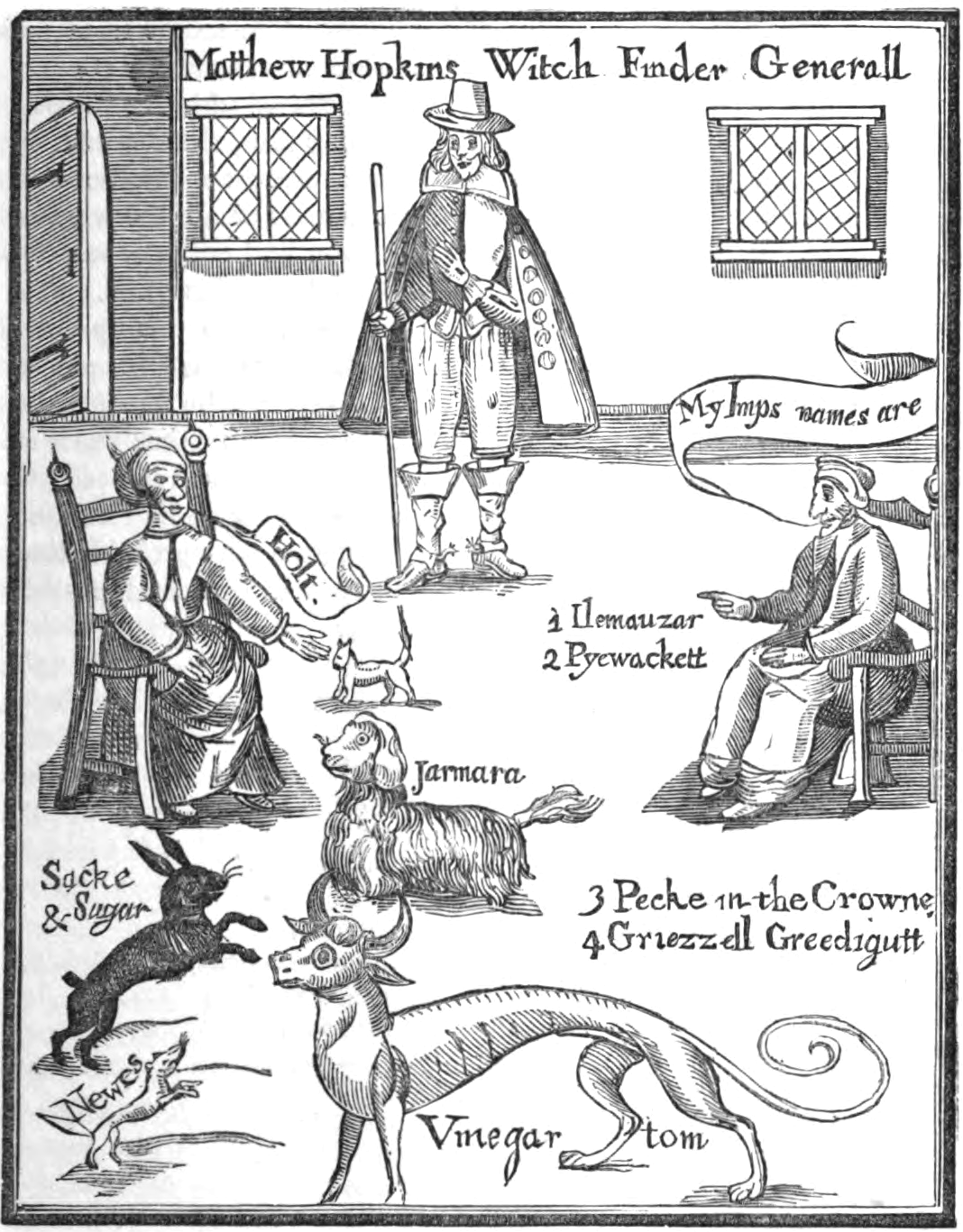
Witch Hunter, Matthew Hopkins

=== Crusades ===
Mackay describes the history of the Crusades as a kind of mania of the Middle Ages, precipitated by the pilgrimages of Europeans to the Holy Land. Mackay is generally unsympathetic to the Crusaders, whom he compares unfavourably to the superior civilisation of Asia: "Europe expended millions of her treasures, and the blood of two millions of her children; and a handful of quarrelsome knights retained possession of Palestine for about one hundred years!"

=== Witch mania ===
Witch trials in 16th- and 17th-century Western Europe are the primary focus of the "Witch Mania" section of the book, which asserts that this was a time when ill fortune was likely to be attributed to supernatural causes. Mackay notes that many of these cases were initiated as a way of settling scores among neighbors or associates, and that extremely low standards of evidence were applied to most of these trials. Mackay claims that "thousands upon thousands" of people were executed as witches over two and a half centuries, with the largest numbers killed in Germany.

=== Sections ===
- The Crusades
- The Witch Mania
- The Slow Poisoners
- Haunted Houses

== Volume III: Philosophical Delusions ==
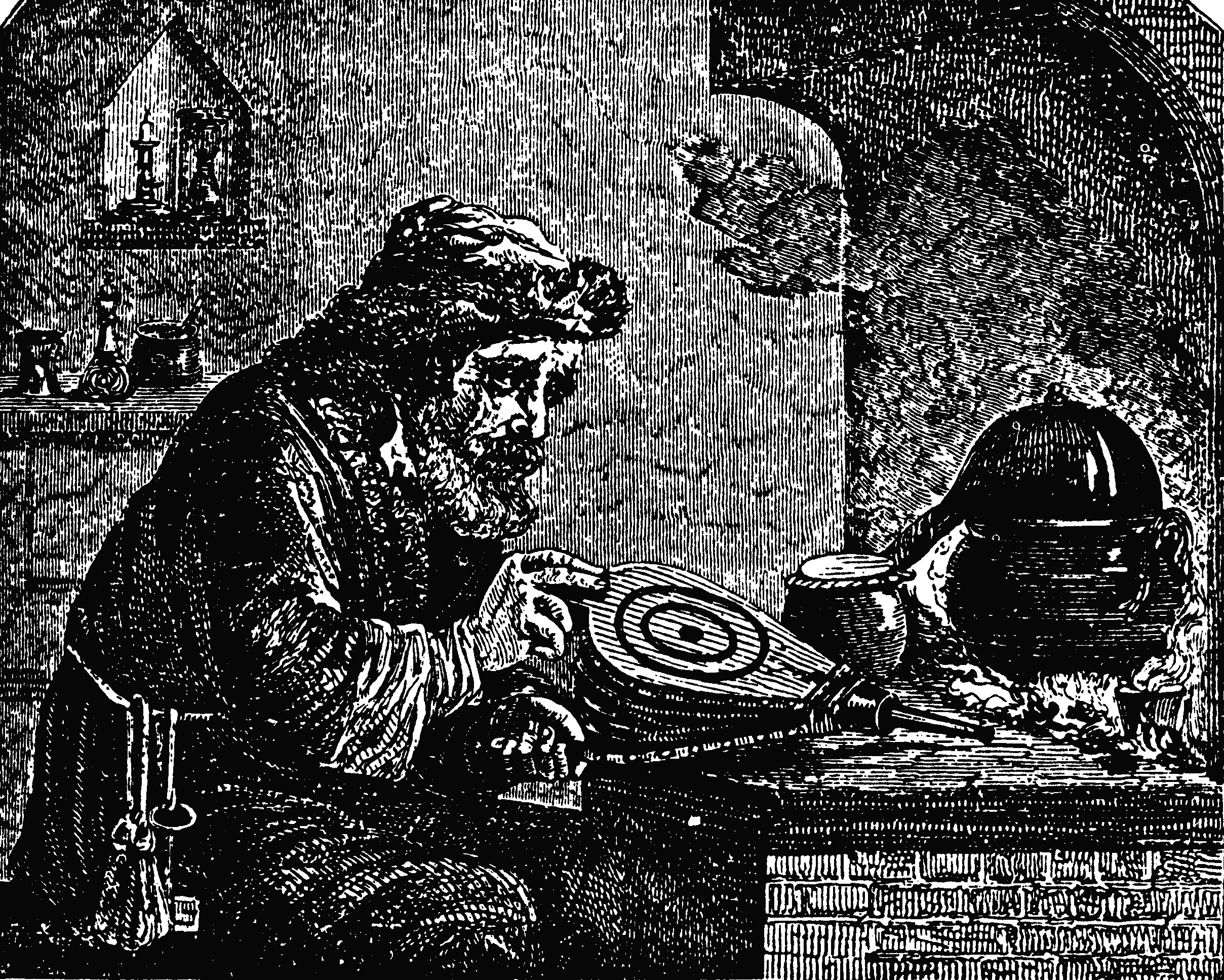
An alchemist, from the 1841/1852 editions of Extraordinary Popular Delusions.

=== Alchemists ===
The section on alchemysts focuses primarily on efforts to turn base metals into gold. Mackay notes that many of these practitioners were themselves deluded, convinced that these feats could be performed if they discovered the correct old recipe or stumbled upon the right combination of ingredients. Although alchemists gained money from their sponsors, mainly noblemen, he notes that the belief in alchemy by sponsors could be hazardous to its practitioners, as sometimes an unscrupulous noble would imprison a supposed alchemist until he could produce gold.

=== Books ===
- Book I: The Alchemysts
- Book II: Fortune Telling
- Book III: The Magnetisers

== Influence and modern responses ==
The book remains in print, and writers continue to discuss its influence, particularly the section on financial bubbles. (See Goldsmith and Lewis, below.)

- Financier Bernard Baruch credited the lessons he learned from Extraordinary Popular Delusions and the Madness of Crowds with his decision to sell all of his stock ahead of the Wall Street crash of 1929.
- Kurt Vonnegut's Slaughterhouse-Five references the book.
- The book was the initial inspiration for Richard Condie's National Film Board of Canada animated short film John Law and the Mississippi Bubble (1978).
- Forbes magazine compared Mackay's descriptions of financial bubbles to the Chinese stock bubble of 2007, claiming that the "emotional feedback loop" that drove the Chinese market was very similar to what Mackay described.
- Neil Gaiman borrows from the title in an issue of his popular comic series, The Sandman, in a story featuring a writer whose novel is titled "... And the Madness of Crowds".
- Author and executive coach Marshall Goldsmith discussed the book in depth in BusinessWeek, drawing extensive parallels between the financial bubbles Mackay wrote about and financial bubbles today. Other writers also frequently point to the book to explain recent financial bubbles.
- Financial writer Michael Lewis includes the financial mania chapters in his book The Real Price of Everything: Rediscovering the Six Classics of Economics as one of the six great works of economics, along with writings by Adam Smith, Thomas Robert Malthus, David Ricardo, Thorstein Veblen, and John Maynard Keynes.
- Author and journalist Will Self writes a column for New Statesman, "Madness of Crowds", which takes its title from Mackay's book.
- James Surowiecki, in The Wisdom of Crowds (2004), takes a different view of crowd behavior, saying that under certain circumstances, crowds or groups may have better information and make better decisions than even the best-informed individual.
- Canadian author Louise Penny used MacKay as an inspiration for her 2021 novel The Madness of Crowds.
- American synthpop band Information Society released a song titled after the book in 2021. Its vocals are mostly samples of cult leader Jim Jones.

== See also ==
- Crowd psychology
- Groupthink
- Irrational exuberance
- Moral panic
- Pseudodoxia Epidemica
