= Ziska =

Ziska may refer to:

- Jan Žižka, a Czech military officer
- Ziska: The Problem of a Wicked Soul, a horror novel by Marie Corelli, first published in 1897
