= Thelma (1910 film) =

- Based on: Marie Corelli's Thelma
- Produced by: Thanhouser Company
- Release date: June 21, 1910
- Country: United States
- Languages: Silent film English intertitles

Thelma is a 1910 American silent short drama film produced by the Thanhouser Company. The story was based on Marie Corelli's 1887 novel of the same name, it focuses on a Norwegian maiden who meets Sir Phillip and the two are wed. Lady Clara conspires to ruin the marriage and tricks Thelma with a letter purported to be from her husband. Thelma returns to Norway and to the death of her father. Thelma, alone in the world, prays at her mother's grave for strength. Sir Phillip searches for Thelma, ultimately finding her, uncovers the tricks which have been played on them and they fall back in love. Released on June 21, 1910, the film was met with praise in The Moving Picture World. An incomplete print of the film survives in the Library of Congress archives.

== Plot ==
Though the film is presumed lost, a surviving synopsis was published in The Moving Picture World on June 25, 1910. It states: "Thelma is a simple Norwegian maiden living alone with her father in the land of the midnight sun. Her father is one of the few remaining Vikings, famous in history. As such he is held in great reverence by his servants, who consider him somewhat in the nature of a king, and his daughter a princess. Outside of the years spent at school, Thelma has spent nearly all her time alone, her mother having died when she was a baby. When on a visit to her mother's grave, Thelma meets Sir Philip Errington, a distinguished young Englishman, who is touring Norway in his private yacht. Sir Philip is instantly attracted to her and, obtaining information as to where she lives, presents himself to Olaf, the Viking, and is finally admitted to his friendship and that of his daughter. Sir Philip woos and wins the fair Thelma for his bride, and with her sails back to England. In London, Thelma at once creates a favorable impression and is cordially welcomed by all of Sir Philip's friends, who comprise the nobility and aristocracy of the metropolis. Lady Clara, alone, of all Sir Philip's old friends, wishes Thelma harm. She has long felt an affection for Sir Phillip, and resents the fact that he spurned her love and chose his bride in far-off Norway. This wicked and designing woman determines to wreck Thelma's happiness, and force her to leave England. This she contrives to do, in making Thelma believe that Sir Philip no longer loves her, but that in truth his heart belongs to Lady Clara. As proof of her statement she shows Thelma a letter written to her by Sir Philip in which he pleads the cause of his friend, who is in love with Lady Clara, and wishes her to become his wife. This Lady Clara claims is a love letter written by Sir Philip to her. Thelma, heartbroken, believing she has lost her husband's love, returns to Norway, just as her father, the Viking, breathes his last. She, with his faithful followers, complies with his last wishes, which are that he shall be buried as his forefathers were before him – sent out to sea in his burning ship. This form of burial had been that accorded to all Vikings for centuries past. After straining her eyes for a final look at the departing ship, Thelma retraces her steps to her mother's grave, and there, feeling that she is absolutely alone, prays for the strength to live. Here in a rocky dell before the tomb of her mother, where first she met the man who won her heart, Sir Philip again finds Thelma. A few words suffice to show her how she has been tricked, and a fervent protestation of his love convinces her that she still has a place in his heart. In Sir Philip's arms she finds comfort for the loss of her father; she starts out bravely to again face the world, now sure of his unending love."

== Cast ==
- Anna Rosemond as Thelma
- Frank H. Crane as Sir Philip Errington
- Yvonne Marvin as Lady Clara Ashley
- Alphonse Ethier as Viking Olaf

== Production ==
Thelma is a film adaptation of the 1887 novel of the same name. It was written under the pen name Marie Corelli by Mary Mackay. During the era, her novels were so well-known that some reviewers did not need to include a summary of the plot of the film to reader. A brief review in The Moving Picture World went so far as to say, "Practically everybody has read the novel, hence no long explanation is required." Film historian Q. David Bowers, states, "Although present-day scholars consider her works to be of no serious literary importance, she is remembered by the science-fiction world for her vivacious imagination and her "scientific discoveries," including interstellar travel via personal electricity. Her writings were known in her time for sublimated sex, fervent religiosity, and far-fetched fantasy." The writer of the scenario is unknown, but it was most likely Lloyd Lonergan. Lonergan was an experienced newspaperman employed by The New York Evening World while writing scripts for the Thanhouser productions. He was the most important script writer for Thanhouser, averaging 200 scripts a year from 1910 to 1915. The film director is unknown, but it may have been Barry O'Neil. The Complete Index to Literary Sources in Film assigns Theodore Marston as the director this film, but this would seem to be in error. The apparent origin of this error is from the American Film-Index 1908–1915. Bowers consulted one of the co-authors of the book, Gunnar Lundquist, and confirmed that the credit of Marston was in error. Theodore Marston worked with Pathé, Kinemacolor Company of America, Vitagraph and other companies, but there is no record of Marston working with Thanhouser. Bowers does not attribute a cameraman for this production, but two possible candidates exist. Blair Smith was the first cameraman of the Thanhouser company, but he was soon joined by Carl Louis Gregory who had years of experience as a still and motion picture photographer. The role of the cameraman was uncredited in 1910 productions.

Cast in the role of Thelma was Anna Rosemond, one of two leading ladies, of the Thanhouser Company at the time. The more minor role of Sir Philip Errington was played by Frank H. Crane, who acted in numerous productions before becoming a director at Thanhouser. The conspiring Lady Clara Ashley was played by Yvonne Marvin, an actress that Bowers cites as her first and only known credit with Thanhouser. The role of Thelma's father was played by Alphonse Ethier, a stage actor who had intermittent credited appearances in Thanhouser productions.

== Release and reception ==
The single reel drama, approximately 1000 feet long, was released on June 21, 1910. A review in The Moving Picture World praised the film by stating, "The picture is admirably staged and acted and maintains the interest from beginning to end. Of course the picture does not contain the detail of the novel, but it is a distinct improvement upon the play. It deserves a long run." Identifying the theaters in which the film was shown is made difficult by the number of Thelma plays and later Selig Polyscope's own version of Thelma which appeared in 1911. The popularity of the play predates the film adaptation by Thanhouser, one of the troupes to perform the play in 1910 were the Preston & Brickett Majestic Players. Once the Selig film was released, the two productions were often not distinguished in advertisements. One of the last known advertisements, conclusively for the Thanhouser production, was in 1913. An incomplete 35 mm print of the film survives in the Library of Congress archives. This print is missing the main title, credits, and likely the conclusion of the film. Only the funeral scene shows red film tinting.

== See also ==
- List of American films of 1910
