= R. S. Warren Bell =

British writer and editor

Robert Stanley Warren Bell (1871 – 26 September 1921), was an English novelist, journalist and the first editor of The Captain, a magazine featuring stories for 'boys and old boys', of which P. G. Wodehouse was an early contributor.

== Life ==
Robert Stanley Warren Bell was born in 1871 at Long Preston, Yorkshire, the eldest son of the Rev. George Edward Bell. In 1875 his father was appointed Vicar of Henley-in-Arden, Warwickshire, and it was here that Robert spent most of his childhood. One of twelve children, his brothers included John Keble Bell who, under the pen name Keble Howard, also became a writer and journalist. Robert was educated at St John's School, Leatherhead.

In 1890 Bell began a career in journalism on Tit-Bits and afterwards joined the Evening News. He became a contributor of stories and papers to The Pall Mall Gazette and The Westminster Gazette a number of which were subsequently published as The Papa Papers and The Cub in Love.

Bell’s first novel was Bachelorland. In 1898 he was appointed first editor of The Captain which published a number of school stories written by P. G. Wodehouse. Bell himself contributed stories to The Captain including The Duffer, Cox's Cough Drops and Green at Greyhouse.

Bell co-wrote Marie Corelli: the Writer and the Woman, a 1903 biography of novelist Marie Corelli, with Thomas F. G. Coates.

Bell retired from The Captain in 1910. He wrote a short story, Company for George, which he turned into a play that was performed at the Kingsway Theatre in 1910 and he later adapted into a novel. Most of his later work was directed towards the schoolboy market and featured stories set in schools.

In 1905 Bell married Edithe M. Barry.

Bell died aged 50 on 26 September 1921, after a long illness, in the Sussex County Hospital, Brighton. His obituary in The Times stated that he would be 'much missed by his friends. as well as by his large constituency of schoolboy readers, who recognized in him a kindred spirit. He was very tall, standing over 6ft. 4in.'
