= Marie Corelli: the Writer and the Woman =

1903 biography of Marie Corelli

- Author: Thomas F. G. Coates; R. S. Warren Bell
- Language: English
- Subject: Marie Corelli
- Genre: Biography
- Publication date: 1903

Marie Corelli: the Writer and the Woman is a 1903 biography of British novelist Marie Corelli written by Thomas F. G. Coates and R. S. Warren Bell. It was written while Corelli was still alive, around halfway through the 40-year period during which she was actively writing.

The book was highly flattering to Corelli and her writing. It focused mostly on discussions of Corelli's books, rather than her personal life.

== Contents ==
The majority of the book is devoted to analyses of Corelli's novels. The book's preface warns that, as a courtesy to Corelli, the authors were able to include "only a limited number of personal minutiæ". The content devoted to Corelli's early life repeats the falsehood which she spread during her lifetime, that she was the adopted daughter of Charles Mackay. Following her death, it became known that he was in fact her father, and that Corelli was born Mary "Minnie" Mackay.

Like Corelli herself, the authors are disdainful of literary critics, and their treatment of Corelli's novels, which was generally lukewarm at best. The book includes a photograph of Corelli's dog, a small Yorkshire terrier, apparently chewing up press cuttings.

In all, the book includes sixteen pictures, though none depict Corelli herself.

== Reception ==
Critics largely dismissed Marie Corelli: The Writer and the Woman as hopelessly biased in its effusive praise of Corelli.

The Courier-Journal of Louisville, Kentucky judged the book's eulogistic tone as being in poor taste for a biography of a living subject.

A review in The Observer described it as a "frank and unfettered panegyric" which "will prove highly attractive to Miss Corelli's admirers, and heartily amusing to the minority which has not yet been won over." As evidence of the book's laudatory tone, the review included the following extended quote from the book's first chapter:

Marie Corelli is bold; perhaps she is the boldest writer that has ever lived. What she believes she says, with a brilliant fearlessness that sweeps aside petty argument in its giant’s stride towards the goal for which she aims. She will have no half-measures. Her works, gathered together under one vast cover, might fitly be printed and published as an amplified edition of the Decalogue.

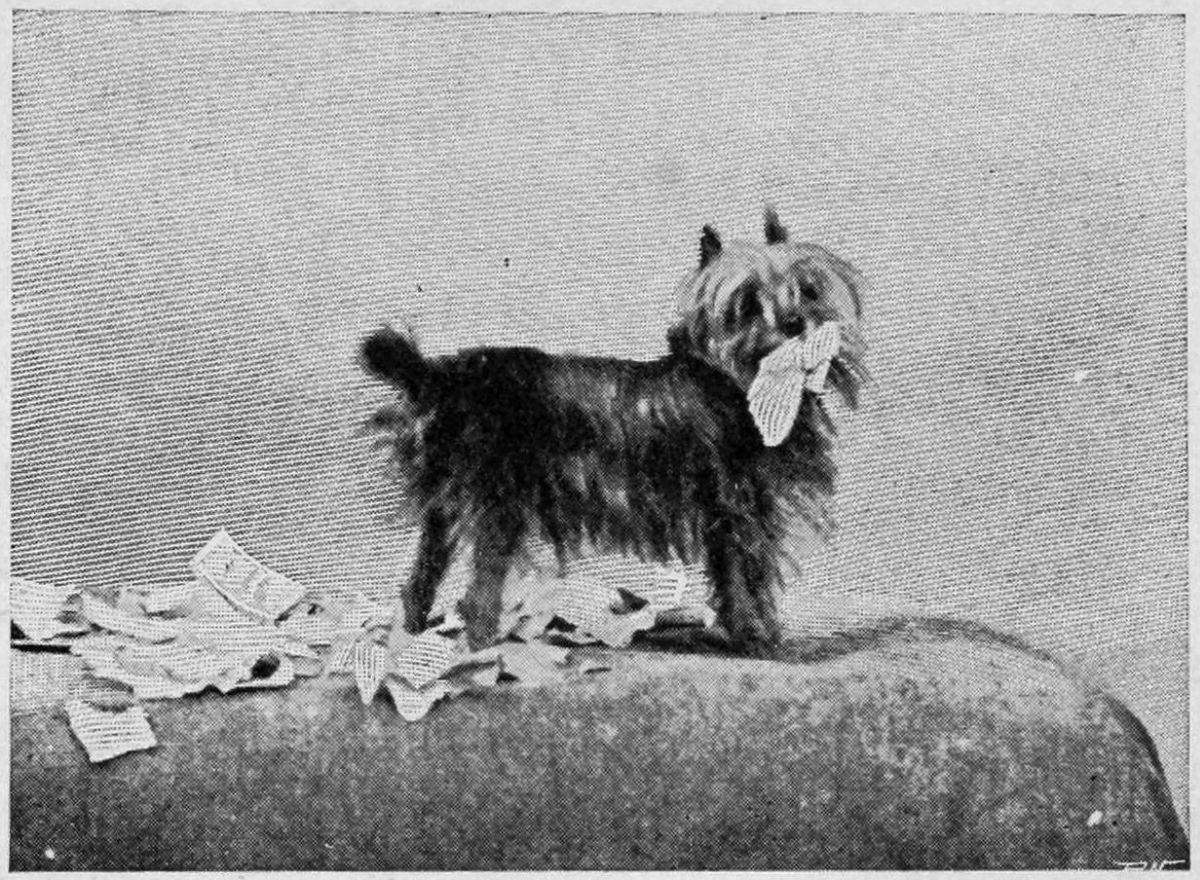
An illustration from the book apparently showing Corelli's Yorkshire terrier, Czar, chewing critics' reviews. It bore the caption "What Becomes of the Press Cuttings".

It is small wonder, then, that she has not earned the approbation of those critics who are unable to grasp the stupendous nature of her programme; they, having always held by certain canons, and finding those canons brusquely disregarded, retort with wholesale condemnation of matters that they deem literary heterodoxy, but whose sterling simplicity is in reality altogether beyond their ken. Fortunately, their words have failed to frighten off the public, which, ever loyal to one fighting for the right, has supported and befriended Marie Corelli in her dauntless crusade against vice and unbelief. Other writers have doubtless written in a somewhat similar strain, and it has not been their fault that the woman who forms the subject of this biography has eclipsed all the worthy makers of such books who have preceded her. Power has been given her, and she has not proved false to her trust. Genius is Heaven-sent, to be used or abused according to the will of its possessor; let those so gifted beware lest they cast the pearls of their brain before swine, for of a surety there will come a day of reckoning when every genius, as well as every other man, shall be called upon to give an account of his stewardship.

== Authors ==
Thomas F. G. Coates had previously written a biography of Archibald Primrose, 5th Earl of Rosebery, The Life of Lord Rosebery.
