= Hiscutt =

Hiscutt is a surname. Notable people with the surname include:

- Des Hiscutt (born 1933), Australian politician
- Hugh Hiscutt (1926–2023), Australian politician, brother of Des
- Leonie Hiscutt (born 1959), Australian politician, niece of Des and Hugh

== See also ==
- Hiscott
