= Thelma =

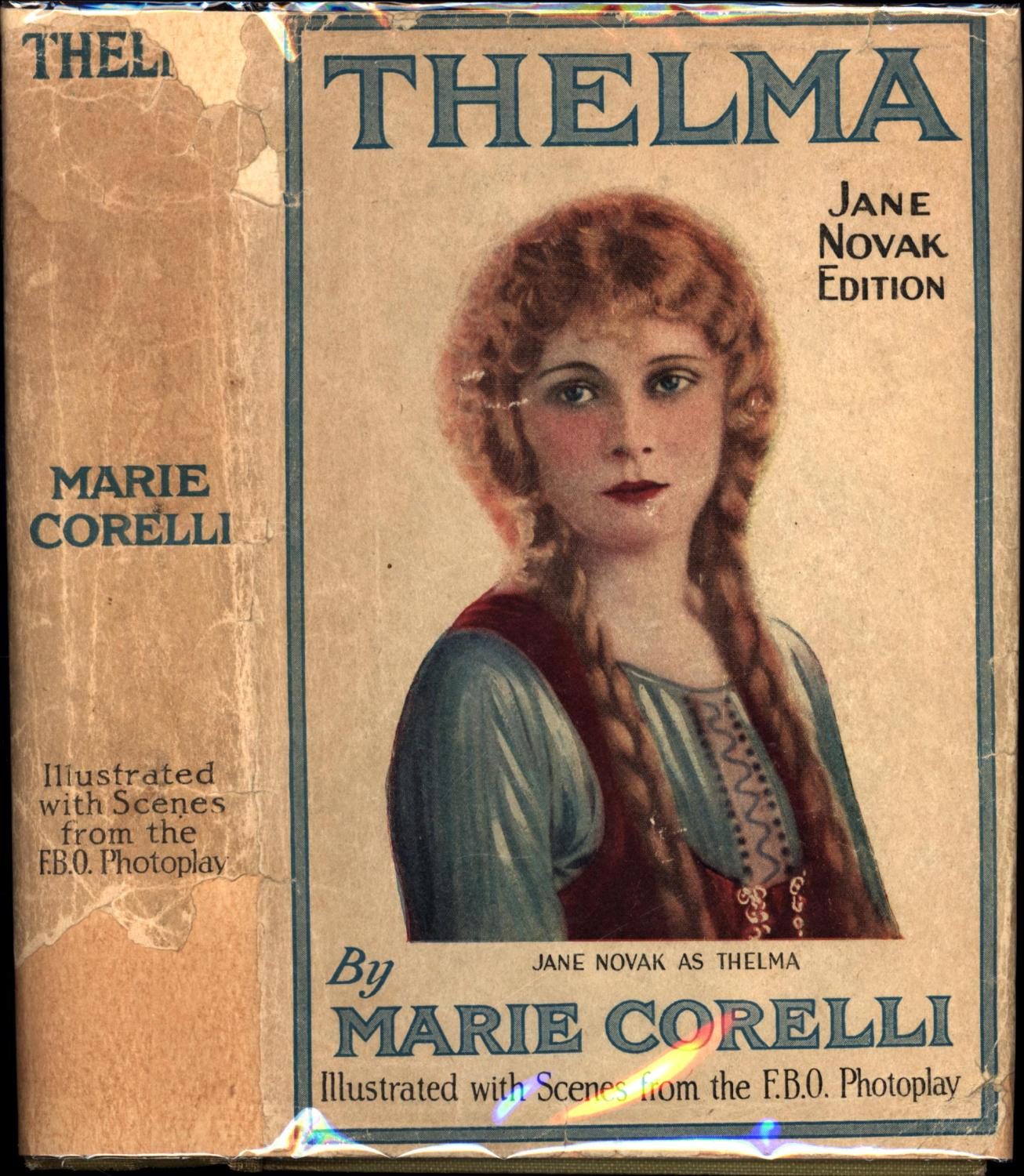
- The 1887 novel Thelma by Marie Corelli popularized the name Thelma.
- Gender: Female
- Language: English

Thelma is a female given name. It was popularized by Victorian writer Marie Corelli who gave the name to the title character of her 1887 novel Thelma. Although the character was supposed to be Norwegian, it is not a traditional Scandinavian name. It may be related to a Greek word meaning "will, volition" see Thelema). Note that although consonant with another female given name, Selma, the two are not synonymous.

== People with the name ==
- Thelma Akana Harrison (1905–1972), American politician
- Thelma Aoyama (born 1987), Japanese pop singer
- Thelma Dís Ágústsdóttir (born 1998), Icelandic basketball player
- Thelma Barlow (born 1929), English actress
- Thelma Carpenter (1922–1997), American jazz singer and actress
- Thelma Cazalet-Keir (1899–1989), British politician
- Thelma Drake (born 1949), American politician
- Thelma Eisen (1922–2014), American baseball player
- Thelma Fardin (born 1992), Argentine actress
- Thelma Forbes (1910–2012), Canadian politician
- Thelma Furness, Viscountess Furness (1904–1970), mistress of King Edward VIII
- Thelma Harper (politician) (1940–2021), Tennessee politician
- Thelma Hill (1906–1938), American silent screen actress
- Thelma Holt (born 1932), stage actress and producer
- Telma Hopkins (born 1948), American singer and actress
- Thelma Hopkins (athlete) (1936–2025), Northern Irish athlete
- Thelma Houston (born 1943), American singer
- Thelma Keane (1926–2008), real-life inspiration for "Mommy" in The Family Circus
- Thelma Leeds (1910–2006), American actress
- Thelma Coyne Long (1918–2015), Australian tennis player
- Thelma Nava (1932–2019), Mexican poet, magazine co-founder, publisher, journalist
- Thelma "Pat" Nixon (1912–1993), First Lady of the United States
- Thelma Parr (1906–2000), American actress
- Thelma Pressman (1921–2010), American microwave cooking consultant and cookbook author
- Thelma Rodgers, (1947–2021), Antarctic scientist from New Zealand
- Thelma Ritter (1902–1969), American actress
- Thelma Ruby (born 1925), British actress
- Thelma Schoonmaker (born 1940), American film editor
- Thelma Terry (1901–1966), American bandleader
- Thelma Thall (born 1924), American two-time world table tennis champion
- Thelma Todd (1906–1935), American actress and businesswoman
- Thelma Toole (1901–1984), mother of American author John Kennedy Toole
- Thelma Van Norte (1912–1985), American medical records librarian
- Thelma Votipka (1906–1972), American opera singer
- Thelma Wood (1901–1970), American artist and lover of Djuana Barnes
- Thelma (musician), American musician

== Fictional characters ==
- Thelma Bates, from the TV series Hex
- Thelma Evans, in the sitcom Good Times
- Thelma Harper, from The Carol Burnett Show and Mama's Family
- Thelma Lou, on The Andy Griffith Show
- Thelma Griffin, from Family Guy
- Thelma Dickinson from the 1991 film Thelma and Louise
- Thelma, protagonist of the eponymous 2017 film Thelma
