= Bertha Vyver =

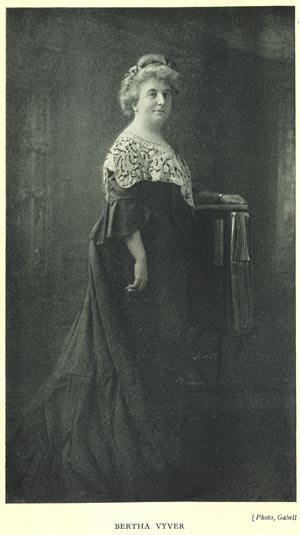

Bertha Vyver (11 June 1854 – 20 November 1941) was a caretaker for Scottish poet Charles Mackay and the companion of Marie Corelli. From 1875 until his death in 1889, Vyver kept house and nursed Mackay, later caring for her own mother prior to her death. Relieved of her nursing duties, Vyver remained with Corelli encouraging and facilitating her writing career. When Corelli died, Vyver became executor of her literary estate and wrote a biography of the author.

== Early life ==
Bertha Amelia Adriana Francisca van der Vyver was born on 11 June 1854 as one of three daughters born to Alphonso Peter Francisco Adrian van der Vyver and his wife. Her father was often reported as a Belgian-Spanish merchant and her mother as a Belgian countess. In actuality, the father, known in England as Peter Francis Adrian Vander Vyver was Dutch and his wife, Pauline Maria Josephine Francisca was French. They married in Jersey in 1850 and moved to England soon after, settling in Lambeth where their daughters Paulina Bertha Laura, Bertha and Adriana Francisca "Ada" were born. The father was an unsuccessful businessman, declaring bankruptcy several times, and made his living from selling fake hereditary titles. He extended the title Count and Countess to himself and his wife. When his daughter Paulina married a real Spanish count, Vander Vyver refused to attend the wedding.

In 1856, the father advised his wife that their marriage had not been legal and they remarried at St George's, Hanover Square on 10 April. In 1859, the Countess, as she was known, removed to Glasgow with the children. The father followed once again setting up a business that went bankrupt. The Countess filed for divorce in Scotland in 1860, which was contested by Vander Vyver on the grounds that the couple were Dutch and could not divorce under Scottish law. Thereafter, they lived separately and the Countess returned to London with the daughters. The Countess established their home at 7 Cleveland Terrace, living a few blocks from Minnie Mackay, who would become a lifelong friend and companion to Bertha. Mackay, who would gain fame as Marie Corelli, shared a similar obscure past, as the illegitimate daughter of Charles Mackay. In the 1860s, the two girls attended convent school together in Paris.

== Career ==
In 1875, Corelli's mother became very ill and was unable to continue caring for the Mackay household. The Countess suggested that Vyver take up the position of caretaker and she moved in with them. The household finances were difficult, as Mackay's pension of £100 per year and income Vyver received were the sole sources of earnings. As Mackay's health declined, the two women and he were forced to move closer to medical facilities and moved to Kensington in 1883. Mackay was left semi-paralyzed from a severe stroke and Vyver was rarely able to leave his side. Besides caring for Mackay, Vyver took up photography and became quite adept, though few of her images have survived. In the meantime, Minnie decided that using her father's name had not helped her earn a living from her writing and she invented a new identity, the Venetian writer, Marie Corelli.

When Mackay died in 1889, Vyver was able to travel with Corelli to Eastbourne for a few days of respite. Soon after returning home, they learned that the Countess, who Corelli had considered as a second mother, was dying as well. The pair went to her home and remained with the Countess until she died. From that point, Vyver was free to travel with Corelli and encourage her writing. Vyver and Corelli were companions who lived together for nearly forty years. In 1901, they moved into a house in Stratford-upon-Avon called Mason Croft on Church Street, which is currently owned by the Shakespeare Institute of the University of Birmingham.

Corelli dedicated several books to her. (Note: "Boy" by Corelli has the dedication "To my dearest friend in the world Bertha Vyver who has known all my life from childhood and has been the witness of all my literary work from its very beginning this simply story is gratefully and lovingly dedicated." "Thelma" (1887) was also dedicated "To my dearest friend, Bertha Vyver, in recognition of her sweet companionship, tender sympathy, and most faithful love".) They lived together until 1924, when Corelli died and in accordance with her will, left everything she owned to Vyver.

One of the great friendships of modern times knit together the hearts and minds of Miss Marie Corelli and Miss Bertha Vyver.... Her own heart was the hearth of her comrade, and thought and love of 'Marie' thrilled through Miss Vyver's veins.... In loneliness of soul, Miss Vyver mourns the loss of one who was nearer and tenderer to her than a sister.... Over the fireplace in the fine, old spacious lounge at Mason Croft, the initials M. C. and B. V. were carven into one symbol. And it was the symbol of life.

— Sidney Walton, in the Yorkshire Evening News following Corelli's death

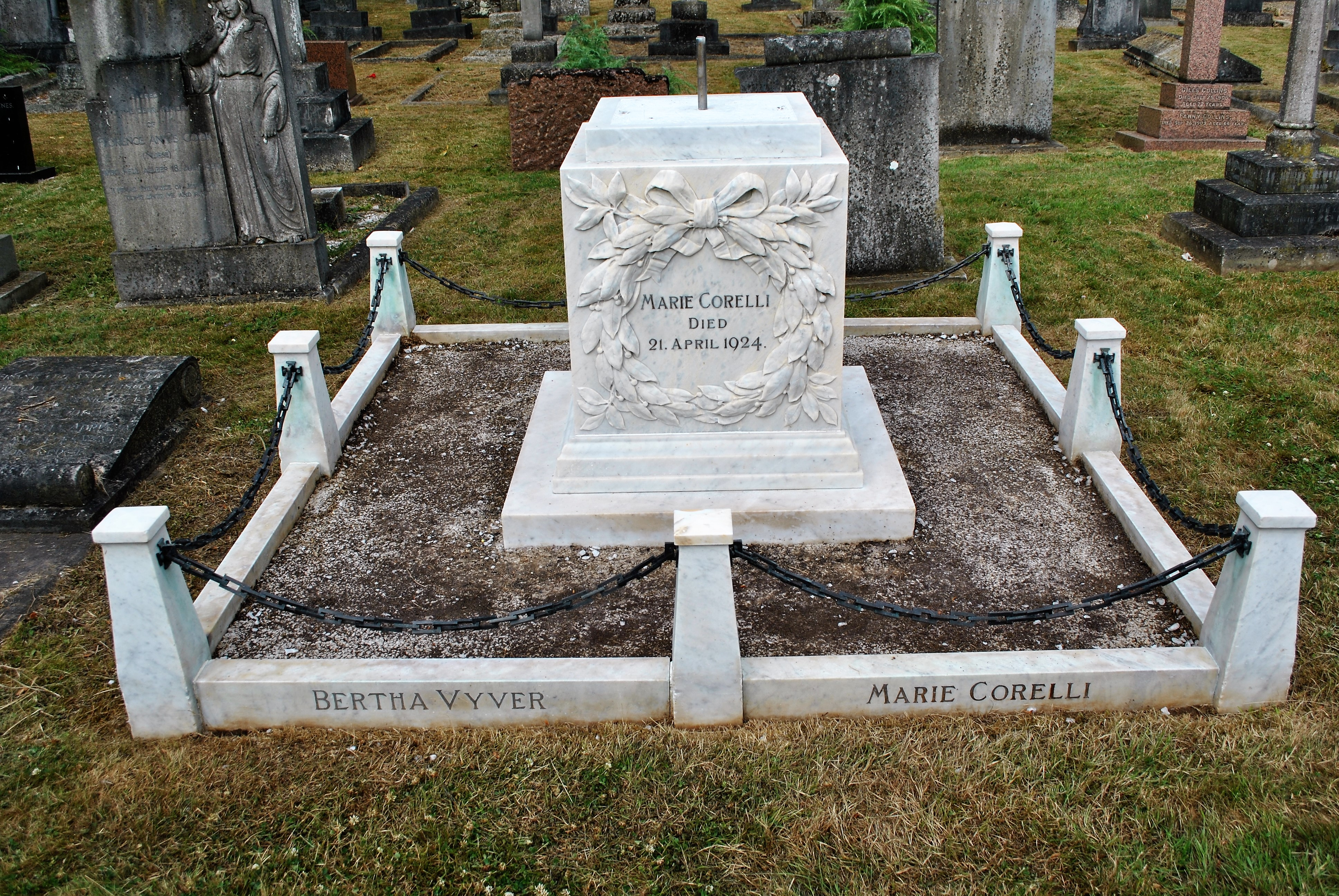
Joint gravesite for Marie Corelli and Bertha van der Vyver, Evesham Road cemetery, Stratford-upon-Avon

== Final years ==
Vyver continued to maintain the house at Stratford-upon-Avon, as if Corelli were still alive. As literary executor, she published Corelli's Open Confession the year following the author's death. Vyver wrote "Memoirs of Marie Corelli", which was published in 1930. In dwindling health, by 1939, Vyver was weary of maintaining the estate trusts, but was determined to keep it intact as per Corelli's wishes. The war intervened in the trustees taking action until after her death. The two women are buried together in the Evesham Road cemetery, Stratford-upon-Avon.

== Bibliography ==
- Federico, Annette (2000). Idol of Suburbia: Marie Corelli and Late-Victorian Literary Culture. University of Virginia Press. ISBN 978-0-8139-1915-7.
- Ransom, Teresa (2013). The Mysterious Miss Marie Corelli: Queen of Victorian Bestsellers (2nd ed.). Seaford, England: Bulbeck Books. ISBN 978-1-78301-073-8.
- Waller, Philip (2008). Writers, Readers, and Reputations: Literary Life in Britain 1870-1918. Oxford, England: Oxford University Press. ISBN 978-0-19-954120-1.
