= Hiscott =

Hiscott is a surname. Notable people with the surname include:

- Gillian Hiscott (born 1959), British writer and playwright
- James Hiscott (1826–1917), Canadian politician
- Jim Hiscott (born 1948), Canadian composer, radio producer and accordionist
- Leslie S. Hiscott (1894–1968), British film director and screenwriter
