= The Young Diana =

1922 film by Albert Capellani

- Theatrical release poster
- Directed by: Albert Capellani; Robert G. Vignola
- Screenplay by: Luther Reed
- Based on: The Young Diana by Marie Corelli
- Starring: Marion Davies; Macklyn Arbuckle; Forrest Stanley; Gypsy O'Brien; Pedro de Cordoba
- Cinematography: Harold Wenstrom
- Production company: Cosmopolitan Productions
- Distributed by: Paramount Pictures
- Release date: August 27, 1922
- Running time: 90 minutes
- Country: United States
- Language: Silent (English intertitles)

The Young Diana is a lost 1922 American silent drama film directed by Albert Capellani and Robert G. Vignola and written by Luther Reed. The film stars Marion Davies, Macklyn Arbuckle, Forrest Stanley, Gypsy O'Brien, and Pedro de Cordoba. It is based on the 1918 novel The Young Diana by Marie Corelli. The film was released on August 27, 1922, by Paramount Pictures.

== Cast ==
- Marion Davies as Diana May
- Macklyn Arbuckle as James P. May
- Forrest Stanley as Commander Cleeve
- Gypsy O'Brien as Lady Anne
- Pedro de Cordoba as Dr. Dimitrius

== Production ==
In her 14th film, Marion Davies plays the young Diana May. The film required Davies to play a faded, aged woman and also employs a science fiction theme of rejuvenation. This was a troubled production. Albert Capellani began production in April 1921, but he was replaced by Robert G. Vignola (who may have re-shot all of Capellani's footage), and the film was finally released in August 1922. Forrest Stanley co-stars with Davies for the third time.
