= Helen Donald-Smith =

English artist

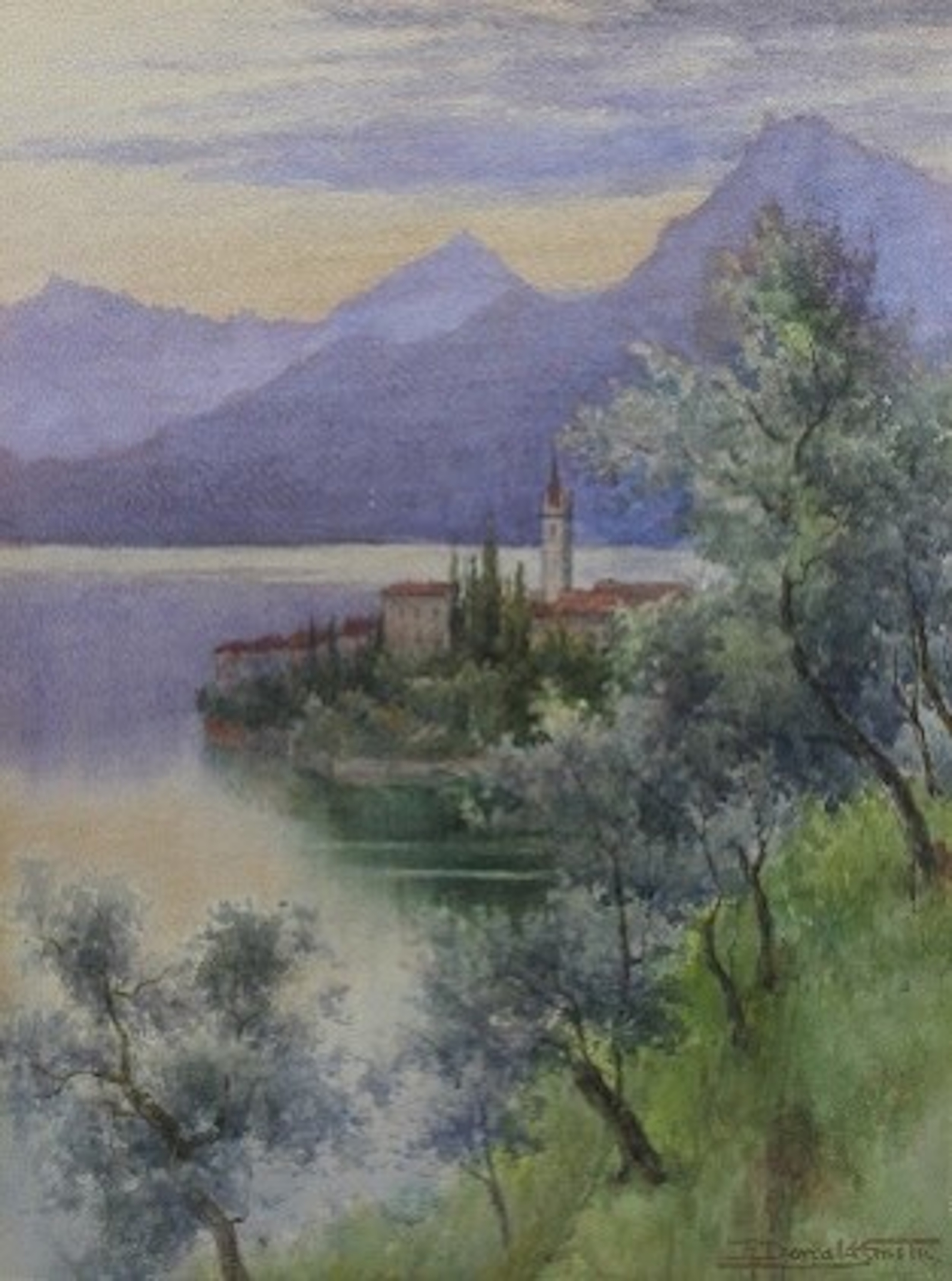
H. Donald-Smith. Varenna from the Campo Santo, 1906.

H. Donald-Smith. Portrait of a Young Boy with Riding Crop against a Wooded Landscape.

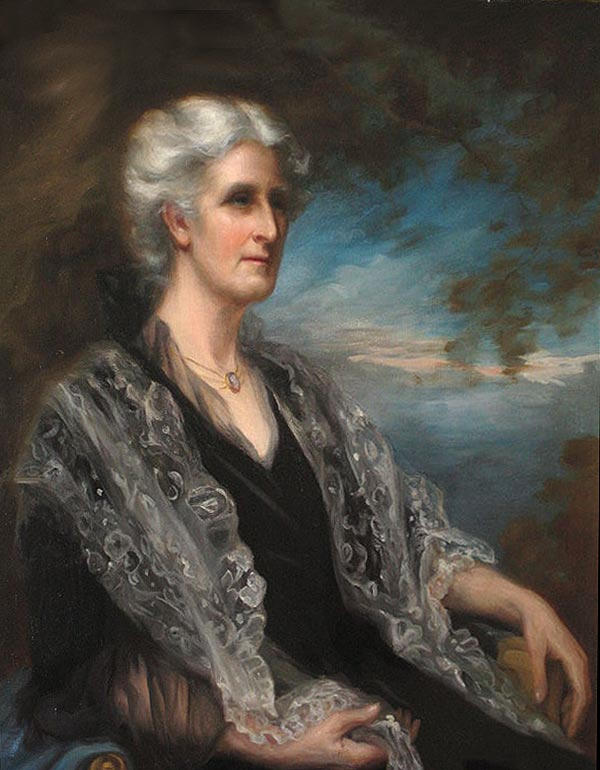
H. Donald-Smith. Katherine Duff.

H. Donald-Smith. Brigadier General F.W. Lumsden VC, DSO, 1920.

Helen Donald-Smith (before 30 September 1852 – 23 July 1933) was a British artist who worked in oil and watercolour, and was active circa 1890–1925. Her work featured landscapes, particularly of Venice, and portraits, including that of Brigadier General F.W. Lumsden VC, DSO.

Born Helen Mary Smith and baptised at Largs, Ayrshire, Scotland on 30 September 1852, she was the fifth and youngest child of Donald Smith and his wife Mary (nee McKerrell). Both she and her mother adopted the hyphenated surname Donald-Smith later in life when living in London. She died at Kensington on 23 July 1933 never having married.

== Career ==
On 14 March 1890, The Times reviewed an exhibition of the Royal Institute of Painters in Water Colours, finding the exhibition in general to be of "fair average quality. A rather novel feature of it is that some of the best works are contributed by the oldest of the members and the youngest of the outsiders". The work was commented on individually, and the (anonymous) reviewer found "charming examples of the art of three ladies, flower-pieces by Madame Teresa Hegg de Lauderset (210) and Mrs. Duffield, and a pair of Thames landscapes by Miss H. Donald-Smith (209, 211). These last show a marked advance on any of the artist's previous work."

She painted Sir William Robert Grove c. 1890s (NPG 1478) and Mary Mackay ("Marie Corelli") in 1897 (NPG 4891). She painted Mrs (Edward) Alexander James Duff, née (Amy) Katherine Barnett (1854–1943). She painted Mary Elizabeth Kathleen Dulcie Deamer (1890–1972) about 1921.

In December 1906, she had a solo exhibition, River, lake and garden : exhibition of water-colours by Miss H. Donald-Smith, at the Modern Gallery, 61 New Bond Street. This was visited by Princess Louise, Duchess of Argyll who also viewed on the same premises an exhibition by Percy French and the picture Mater Christi by Herman Salomon.

Advertisement in The Times, 17 March 1909.

On 10 March 1909, the Baillie Gallery, which had recently moved from Baker Street to 13 Bruton Street, staged their fourth annual exhibition of flower paintings. The Times described the proprietor as having "an excellent taste in art" and his exhibitions of "a fairly high standard". The flower painting genre was one which had fallen into disfavour, after a high point, but which was now being revived again. 148 works were on display, under a third showing gardens and the others depicting flowers.

At the same time as this show, two adjacent rooms were given over to 63 drawings of Venice by Donald-Smith, whose reputation had previously been for her oil paintings, particularly her portraits. Venice was a subject in vogue at the time. Donald-Smith’s work was reviewed as "Without any great distinction they are very accurate and very agreeable, and any lover of Venice may spend a most pleasant half-hour amongst these pictures of the beloved city."

In July 1913, Donald-Smith was recorded on the First List of Subscriptions, as having given £3.3.0 to the Lord Wolseley Memorial Fund, where she was titled "Miss".

In 1920, the Mess of the Royal Marines commissioned two portraits from Donald-Smith of Brigadier General F.W. Lumsden VC, DSO (1871–1918), of the Royal Marine Artillery. The work is now housed in the Royal Marines Museum in the Royal Marine Artillery Barracks, Southsea, Portsmouth.

H. Donald-Smith. View of Venice.

In February 1925, there was an exhibition of 90 water colours by Donald-Smith at the Gieves Gallery, 22 Old Bond Street, London. These ranged over a number of English counties, as well as some Italian locations, including Venice. They were described as coming into the genre of "pretty pictures" by The Times, which said:

The big study of Façade of St Mark's is by no means a bad performance of its kind, but, speaking generally, Miss Donald-Smith's work is much better in feeling and atmosphere than in construction and drawing. It gains according to the obvious picturesqueness of the subjects. The Lover's Walk, Falmouth. The Quadriga, a nocturne, The Sand Gate, Winchelsea, and Ann Hathaway's Cottage. are amongst the happiest efforts.

== Auction ==
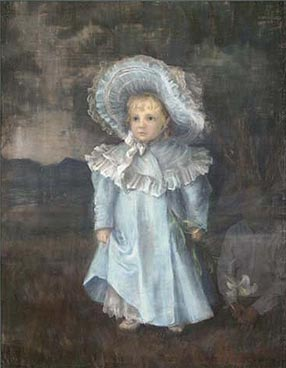
H. Donald-Smith. Portrait of a Young Girl, Full Length, in a Blue Dress and Matching Bonnet, Holding a Lily, 1897.

- Feeding Pigeons, St Marks Square, Venice, a work on paper, was auctioned at Sotheby's on 18 October 1990, for £1,400.
- Portrait of Young Mother and Daughter on Marble Garden Seat, work on paper, was auctioned at Graves Son & Pilcher Fine Arts on 28 September 1995, for £900.
- Portrait of a Young Girl in a Blue Dress and Matching Bonnet, Holding a Lily 1897, pastel, was auctioned at Christie's, South Kensington, British, Continental & Russian Pictures, on 19 July 2006, for £300.

== See also ==
- Portrait painting
