= Love and the Philosopher =

1923 novel by Marie Corelli

- Author: Marie Corelli
- Language: English
- Genre: Drama
- Publication date: 1923
- Publication place: United Kingdom
- Media type: Print

Love and the Philosopher is a 1923 novel by the British writer Marie Corelli.

== Bibliography ==
- Ayres, Brenda & Maier, Sarah E. . Reinventing Marie Corelli for the Twenty-First Century. Anthem Press, 2019.
- Vinson, James. Twentieth-Century Romance and Gothic Writers. Macmillan, 1982.
