= Thelma (1922 film) =

1922 silent film

- Directed by: Chester Bennett
- Written by: Thomas Dixon Jr.
- Based on: Thelma by Marie Corelli
- Starring: Jane Novak; Barbara Tennant; Gordon Mullen
- Cinematography: Jack MacKenzie
- Production company: Chester Bennett Productions
- Distributed by: Film Booking Offices of America
- Release date: November 26, 1922
- Running time: 60 minutes
- Country: United States
- Languages: Silent; English intertitles

Thelma is a 1922 American silent drama film directed by Chester Bennett and starring Jane Novak, Barbara Tennant and Gordon Mullen. It is based on the 1887 novel of the same title by the British writer Marie Corelli.

A Norwegian woman falls in love with an Englishman and moves to London to live with him. However his jealous friends plot to drive them apart.

Thelma as a child was played by Jane Novak's four-year-old daughter Virginia.

== Cast ==
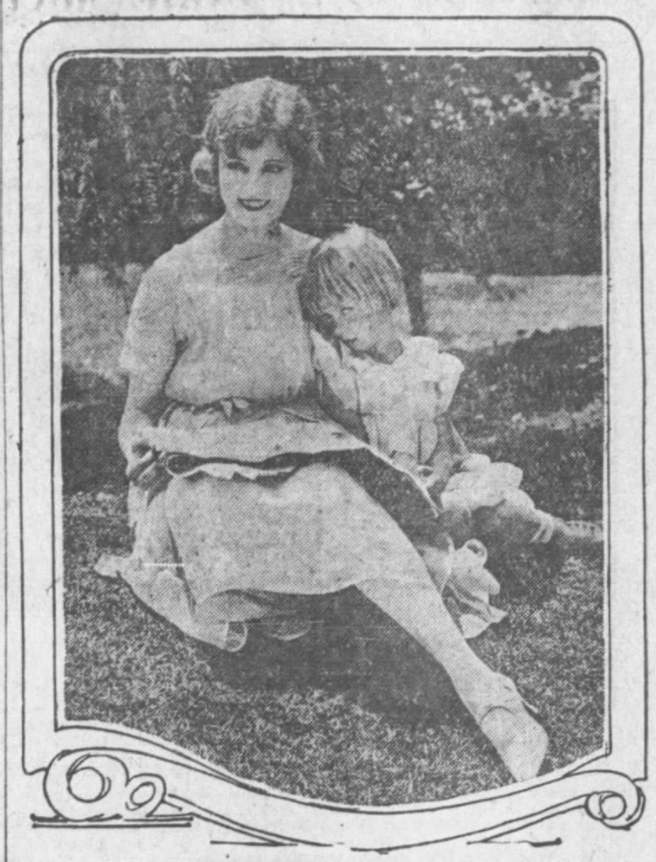
Jane and Virginia Novak

- Jane Novak as Thelma Guildmar
- Barbara Tennant as Britta
- Gordon Mullen as Lovissa
- Bert Sprotte as Olaf Guildmar
- Vernon Steele as Sir Phillip Errington
- Peter Burke as Lorimer
- Jack Rollens as Sigurd
- Harvey Clark as Dyceworthy
- June Elvidge as Lady Clara Winsleigh
- Wedgwood Nowell as Lennox
- Virginia Novak as Little Thelma
- Harry Lonsdale as Neville

== Bibliography ==
- Munden, Kenneth White. The American Film Institute Catalog of Motion Pictures Produced in the United States, Part 1. University of California Press, 1997.
