= Frederick Lumsden =

British officer in Royal Marine Artillery

Brigadier-General Frederick Lumsden VC CB DSO & Three Bars
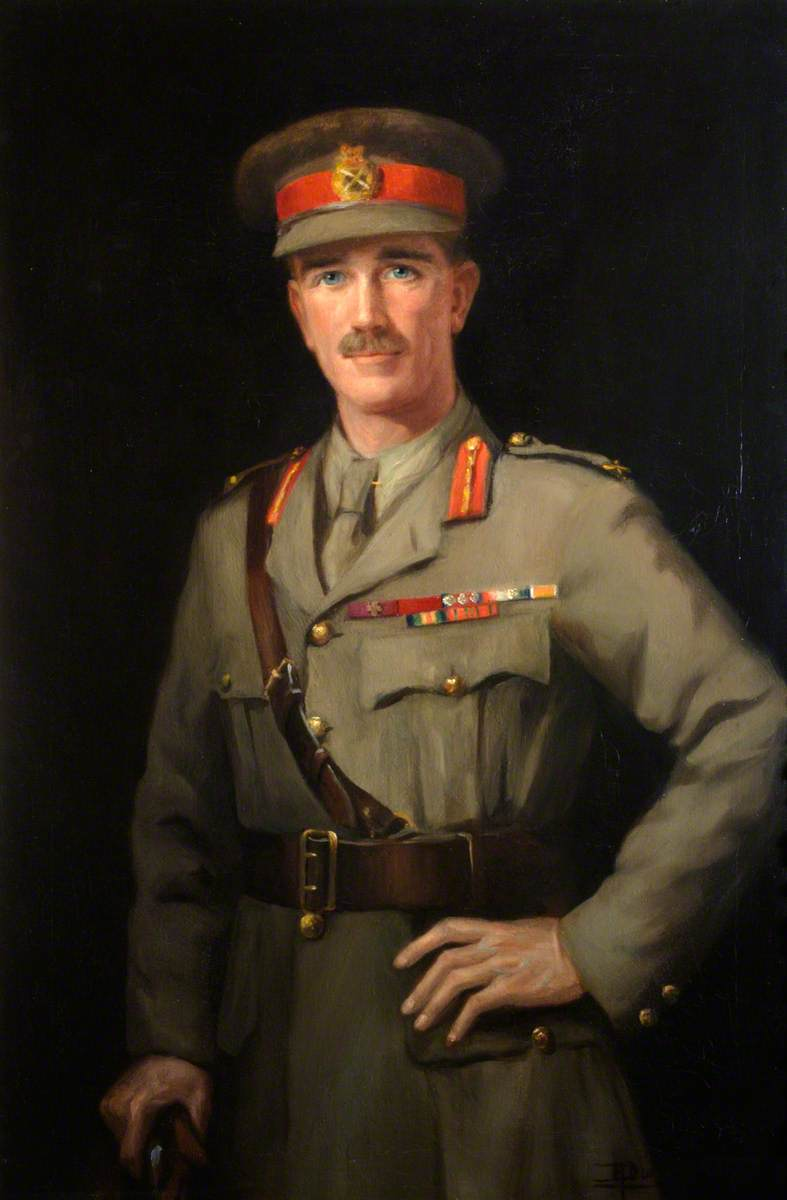
- Portrait by H. Donald Smith, 1920
- Born: 14 December 1872; Faizabad, India
- Died: 4 June 1918 (aged 45); Blairville, Arras, France
- Military career
- Allegiance: United Kingdom
- Branch: Royal Marines
- Service years: 1890–1918
- Rank: Brigadier-General
- Units: Royal Marine Artillery
- Commands: 14th Infantry Brigade; No. 1 Howitzer Battery, Royal Marine Artillery; Royal Marine Artillery Howitzer Brigade
- Conflicts: First World War
- Awards: Victoria Cross; Companion of the Order of the Bath; Companion of the Distinguished Service Order & Three Bars; Mentioned in Despatches (4); Croix de Guerre (Belgium)

Brigadier-General Frederick William Lumsden, VC, CB, DSO & Three Bars (14 December 1872 – 4 June 1918) was a British officer in Royal Marine Artillery and during the First World War. During his service he was decorated four times for valorous service and saw action in several major campaigns before he was killed just months before the war's end in June 1918. Amongst his decorations was the Victoria Cross, the highest award for gallantry to British or Commonwealth troops. He was also the first of seven British officers to be awarded the DSO four times in the First World War.

== Early life ==
Frederick William Lumsden was born into a military family in Faizabad, India, on 14 December 1872. His father, John James Foot Lumsden, worked in the Indian Civil Service. At a young age he returned to Britain and attended Bristol Grammar School.

Lumsden married Mary, the daughter of Lieutenant General Thomas N. Harward of the Royal Artillery, in December 1894. They had one daughter, Violet.

== Military career ==
Lumsden joined the Royal Marine Artillery as a junior officer in September 1890. He served in the Marine Service until 1907, spending time in the Mediterranean and four years on Ascension Island. He entered the British Army Staff College, qualifying in 1908. He then became the second staff officer at Singapore, and was promoted to the rank of major in 1913. He returned home for war service in the months leading up to the outbreak of hostilities in August 1914. He served in France with the Royal Marine howitzer brigade in France until 1915 and was then seconded to serve in staff appointments with the British Army. In late 1915 he was attached to the Intelligence Department of First Army Headquarters. He was promoted to the rank of temporary brigadier general to command the 14th Infantry Brigade in April 1917.

== Awards and decorations ==
On 1 January 1917, Major Lumsden was appointed a Companion of the Distinguished Service Order "for distinguished service in the field". The first and second Bars to his DSO insignia were gazetted together in May 1917, and he was the first person to receive a third Bar in April 1918.

On 8 June 1917, the awarding of the Victoria Cross (VC) to Major Lumsden was approved. This was for actions that took place between 3 and 4 April 1917 in Francilly, France. The citation in The London Gazette reads as follows:

Maj. Frederick William Lumsden, D.S.O., R.M.A.

For most conspicuous bravery, determination and devotion to duty.

Six enemy field guns having been captured, it was necessary to leave them in dug-in positions, 300 yards in advance of the position held by our troops. The enemy kept the captured guns under heavy fire.

Maj. Lumsden undertook the duty of bringing the guns into our lines.

In order to effect this, he personally led four artillery teams and a party of infantry through the hostile barrage. As one of these teams sustained casualties, he left the remaining teams in a covered position, and, through very heavy rifle, machine gun and shrapnel fire, led the infantry to the guns. By force of example and inspiring energy he succeeded in sending back two teams with guns, going through the barrage with the teams of the third gun. He then returned to the guns to await further teams, and these he succeeded in attaching to two of the three remaining guns, despite rifle fire, which had become intense at short range, and removed the guns to safety.

By this time the enemy, in considerable strength, had driven through the infantry covering points, and blown up the breach of the remaining gun.

Maj. Lumsden then returned, drove off the enemy, attached the gun to a team and got it away.

He was appointed as a Companion of the Order of the Bath on 3 June 1918, just a few days before he was killed, "shot through the head by a rifle bullet and killed instantly", according to a fellow officer. He was also mentioned in despatches on four occasions, and awarded the Belgian Croix de guerre.

== Death and remembrance ==
Lumsden was killed in action in his 46th year at Blairville, near the city of Arras, France, on 4 June 1918. His body was buried in the Berles New Military Cemetery, Berles-au-Bois, France.

In 1920 the Mess of the Royal Marines commissioned H. Donald Smith to paint two portraits of Lumsden. The work is now housed in the Royal Marines Museum in the Royal Marine Artillery Barracks, Southsea, Portsmouth. His VC is also displayed at the museum.

== Bibliography ==
- Buzzell, Nora, ed. (1997). The Register of the Victoria Cross. Cheltenham, Gloucestershire: This England Alma House. ISBN 0-906324-27-0.
- Davies, Frank (1997). Bloody Red Tabs: General Officer Casualties of the Great War 1914–1918. London: Pen and Sword Books. ISBN 978-0-85052-463-5.
- Gliddon, Gerald (2012) [1998]. Arras and Messines 1917. VCs of the First World War. Stroud, Gloucestershire: The History Press. ISBN 978-0-7524-6604-0.
