= The Young Diana (novel) =

1918 novel by Marie Corelli

- Author: Marie Corelli
- Language: English
- Genre: Drama
- Publication date: 1918
- Publication place: United Kingdom
- Media type: Print

The Young Diana is a 1918 romantic novel by the British writer Marie Corelli. A scientist develops a new rejuvenation technique that turns an older woman into a beautiful but completely heartless young woman.

== Adaptation ==
In 1922 it was adapted into an American silent film of the same title produced by Paramount Pictures and starring Marion Davies.

== Bibliography ==
- Goble, Alan. The Complete Index to Literary Sources in Film. Walter de Gruyter, 1999.
