= Elachista thelma =

Scientific classification
- Domain: Eukaryota
- Kingdom: Animalia
- Phylum: Arthropoda
- Class: Insecta
- Order: Lepidoptera
- Family: Elachistidae
- Genus: Elachista
- Species: E. thelma

Binomial name
- Elachista thelma Kaila, 1997

Species of moth

Elachista thelma is a moth of the family Elachistidae that is found in California.

The length of the forewings is 4.8–5.8 millimetres (0.19–0.23 in).
