= Gillian Hiscott =

British playwright (born 1959)

Gillian Hiscott (born 1959) is a British author and playwright. She was born in Plymouth, Devon, United Kingdom. Her plays have been performed both in London and at the Edinburgh Festival. Her work in the theatre has been largely to promote the work of British female writers and she is the only published adaptor of work by Marie Corelli. Her last two plays were written whilst completing an MA in Playwriting and Script Development at Exeter University and are examples of plays affected by the literary concept known as the stream of consciousness. Her only novel Lady in Chains is WW2 fiction and centres on an era of social history which reflects a changing way of life for the British aristocracy.

Performing in more than one of the author's plays is veteran actress Beryl Nesbitt, LTDB entry who has featured in many film and TV roles. Involved in Vendetta as performers and directors: Christopher Gutmann, Ralph Mondi, Laurie Hagen.

== Published plays ==
- 1995 Adaptation Emily Brontë's Wuthering Heights, Cressrelles ISBN 0-85343-604-5
- 2007 Adaptation Jane Austen's "Mansfield Park" Jasper ISBN 978-1-905993-48-2 Staged at Upstairs at the Gatehouse. LTDB entry
- 2007 Adaptation Marie Corelli's "Vendetta", 2006, Jasper ISBN 978-1-905993-49-9 – Staged at the Edinburgh Festival.
- 2009 "The Young Diana" Jasper ISBN 9781906997014
- 2009 "Love in Vain in Vain" Jasper ISBN 978-1-906997-00-7

== Novel ==
- 2004 Lady in Chains ISBN 978-0-9546974-0-2
- 2011 Alentejo Magic ISBN 978-0-9546974-3-3

== Poetry ==
- 1992 Morning Listed in Winter Words ISBN 1-85786-009-8

== Play reviews ==
- ThreeWeeks 19 May 2006
- The Bath Chronicle 16 May 2006 "Vendetta" at Bath Fringe Festival
- The Bath Chronicle 2 June 2006 page 21 Philip Horton
- Metro August 2006
- ThreeWeeks 8 August 2006
- The Scotsman 16 August 2006 Andrea Mullaney Edition : Festival Page number: 14
- The Stage 18 August 2006
- Metro 17 July 2007
- Time Out London 23 July 2007
- Camden New Journal 19 July 2007
- Ham & High 19 July 2007 Theatre page X11 Aline Waites

== Articles on ==
- Western Evening Herald 29 May 2006 Page 19 – article by Hannah Wood
- Western Evening Herald 7 March 2009 – article by Martin Freeman
- The Voice of Plymouth Edition Page 6
