= Glasgow Argus =

Former Scottish newspaper

The Glasgow Argus was a Scottish newspaper, published biweekly from 1833 to 1847. It took a reforming editorial line, supporting abolitionism and opposing the Corn Laws. The Argus was perceived as the paper of the supporters of the Glasgow merchant and politician James Oswald.

== History ==
The Glasgow Argus was inaugurated at a meeting on 4 February 1833, chaired by Colin Dunlop of Tollcross, Charles Tennant, George Crawfurd and James Lumsden. At this meeting, it was agreed that the business would be floated on the joint-stock principle. Two hundred shares were issued at a value of £20 each. Shareholders were only permitted to hold a maximum of ten shares.

Initially, the journal was printed by Robert and James Hedderwick, but in 1833, a printing department was created, ostensibly to save money.

The first editor, William Weir, not only made the Argus the recognised organ of the "Clique", as Oswald's Whig and Liberal supporters were known, but pursued a radical editorial line of his own. Eventually in 1839 he was sacked for his radical stance on free trade, incompatible with the Whig views of the proprietors; Weir wished Whig parliamentary candidates to pledge immediate repeal of the Corn Laws. Weir had also upset the shareholders of the paper by printing material critical of leading Whigs including the Lord Advocate, Andrew Rutherfurd.

At the time of the 1847 United Kingdom general election, Charles Mackay disagreed with the paper's management on the choice of local Liberal candidate, and left the position of editor. Although the newspaper had been recently enlarged, it was still making a loss and it was decided to wind it up on 29 November 1847.

== Editors ==
- 1833–1839 William Weir, an Edinburgh advocate. He took a salary of £250 with 20% of the profits. He resigned in 1839 having been perceived as being too radical. He went on to be editor of the Daily News in London.
- 1839–1840 Thornton Leigh Hunt
- 1840–1844 William Lang
- 1844–1847 Charles Mackay
- 1847 John Hill Burton
