= Ardath (novel) =

1889 novel by Marie Corelli

- 1889 US edition (publ. The F.M. Lupton Publishing Co.)
- Author: Marie Corelli
- Language: English
- Genre: Drama
- Publication date: 1889
- Publication place: United Kingdom
- Media type: Print

Ardath is an 1889 novel by the British writer Marie Corelli. It was a popular success.

== Bibliography ==
- Brenda Ayres & Sarah E. Maier. Reinventing Marie Corelli for the Twenty-First Century. Anthem Press, 2019.
