= Thelma (novel) =

1887 novel by Marie Corelli

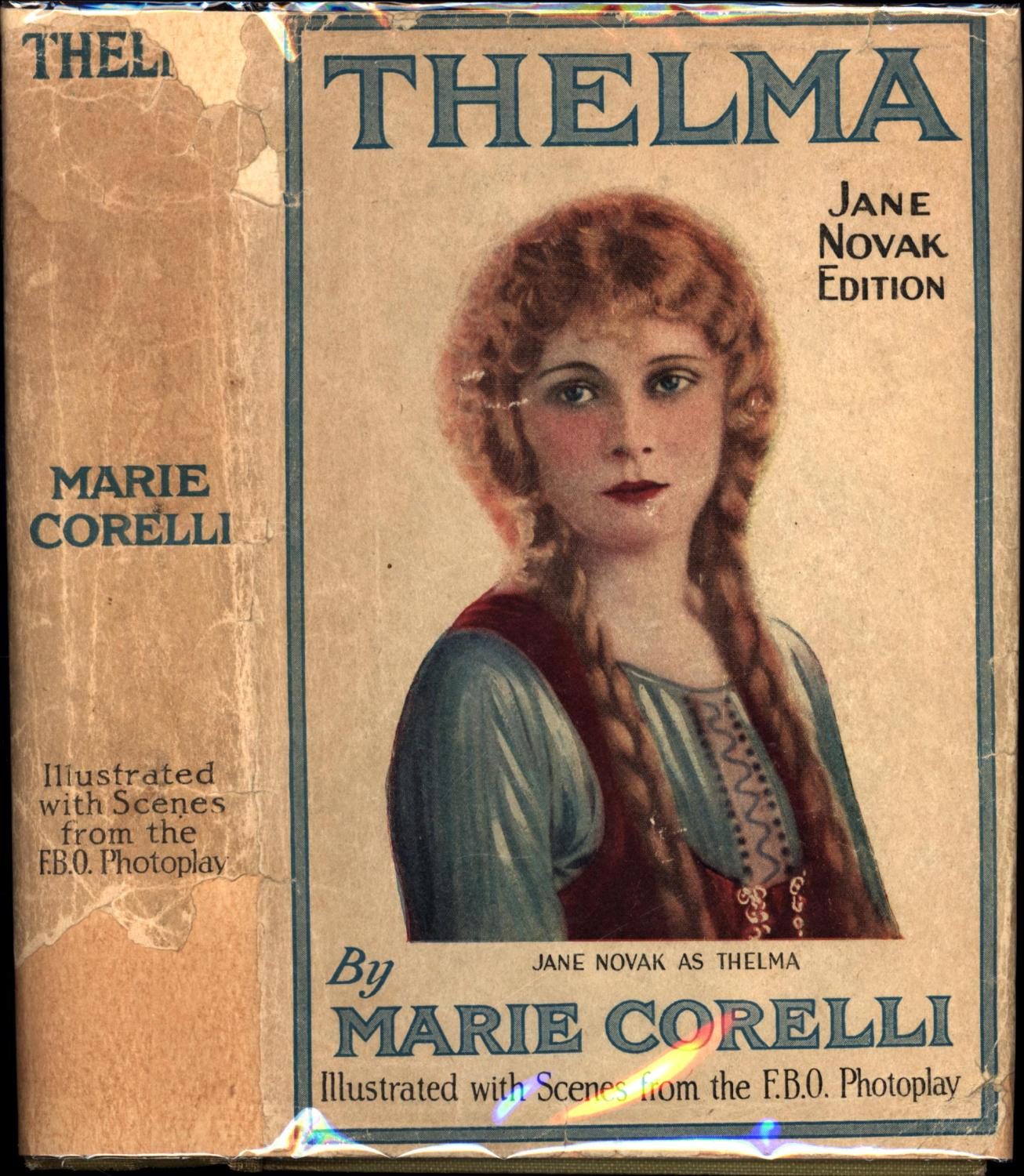
- Cover of a 1922 edition published by Grosset & Dunlap (US) as a tie-in with the film adaptation of the same year.
- Author: Marie Corelli
- Language: English
- Genre: Drama
- Publication date: 1887
- Publication place: United Kingdom
- Media type: Print

Thelma is a romantic novel by the British writer Marie Corelli, first published in 1887. It portrays the relationship between Thelma, a Norwegian woman, and the Englishman Sir Phillip Errington. A popular success, it ran to more than fifty six editions.

== Summary ==
Sir Philip Bruce-Errington (30) meets the beautiful, honest Thelma Guldmar (19) in Norway. Aided by his friend Lorimer (26), Philip and Thelma confess their love and marry with her father Olaf's blessing. The antagonists here are the lustful Reverend Dyceworthy and Lovisa Elsland, an old lady who once loved Thelma's father.

Thelma and her loyal maid Britta are popular in London, but Thelma's beauty evokes widespread resentment, especially from her "friend" Lady Clara Winsleigh. Lady Winsleigh and the lustful Sir Francis Lennox convince Thelma that Philip loves the actress Violet Vere. Thelma leaves Philip and returns to Norway, but her father dies.

Philip goes to Norway and reconciles with Thelma. They have a daughter (who is exactly like her mother) and a son. Lorimer, who has always been a silent admirer of Thelma, marries Thelma's daughter. Britta marries Philip's Parisian friend Pierre Duprez.

== Adaptations ==
The novel was adapted into silent films several times including the British Thelma (1918) and American Thelma (1922).

== Bibliography ==
- Goble, Alan. The Complete Index to Literary Sources in Film. Walter de Gruyter, 1999.
