= Charles Mackay (author) =

Scottish writer (1814–1889)

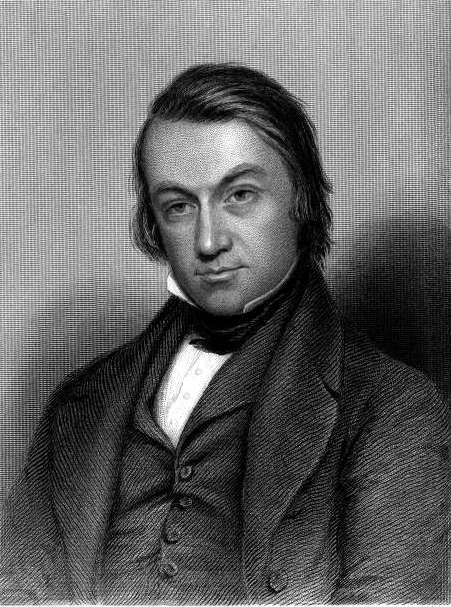
- Illustration by Charles Rogers
- Born: 27 March 1814; Perth, Scotland
- Died: 24 December 1889 (aged 75)
- Citizenship: Scotland
- Occupations: Poet, journalist, and author
- Spouse: Mary Elizabeth Mills (??–1875) Rosa Henrietta Vale
- Children: Marie Corelli
- Writing career
- Notable work: Extraordinary Popular Delusions and the Madness of Crowds

Charles Mackay (27 March 1814 – 24 December 1889) was a Scottish poet, journalist, author, anthologist, novelist, and songwriter, remembered mainly for his book Extraordinary Popular Delusions and the Madness of Crowds.

== Early life ==
Charles Mackay was born in Perth. His father, George Mackay, was a bombardier in the Royal Artillery, and his mother Amelia Cargill died shortly after his birth.

Mackay was educated at the Caledonian Asylum, in London. In 1828 he was placed by his father at a school in Brussels, on the boulevard de Namur, shortly taken over by William James Joseph Drury; and studied languages.

In 1830 he was engaged as a private secretary to William Cockerill, the ironmaster, near Liège, began writing in French in the Courrier belge, and sent English poems to a local newspaper called The Telegraph. In the summer of 1830 he visited Paris, and he spent 1831 with Cockerill at Aix-la-Chapelle. In May 1832 his father brought him back to London, where he first found employment in teaching Italian to the future opera manager Benjamin Lumley.

=== Family ===
Mackay was twice married—first, during his Glasgow editorship, to Rosa Henrietta Vale, by whom he had three sons and a daughter; and secondly to Mary Elizabeth Mills, who was likely a servant in the household previously. His first wife died on 28 December 1859, and his second wife in 1875. The novelist Marie Corelli was an illegitimate daughter, presumably conceived while her mother was working in the household.

== Journalist ==
Mackay engaged in journalism in London: in 1834 he was an occasional contributor to The Sun. From the spring of 1835 till 1844 he was assistant sub-editor of The Morning Chronicle. In the autumn of 1839 he spent a month's holiday in Scotland, witnessing the Eglintoun Tournament, which he described in the Chronicle, and making acquaintances in Edinburgh. In the autumn of 1844, he moved back to Scotland, and became editor of the Glasgow Argus, resigning in 1847. He worked for The Illustrated London News in 1848, becoming editor in 1852.

== Later life ==
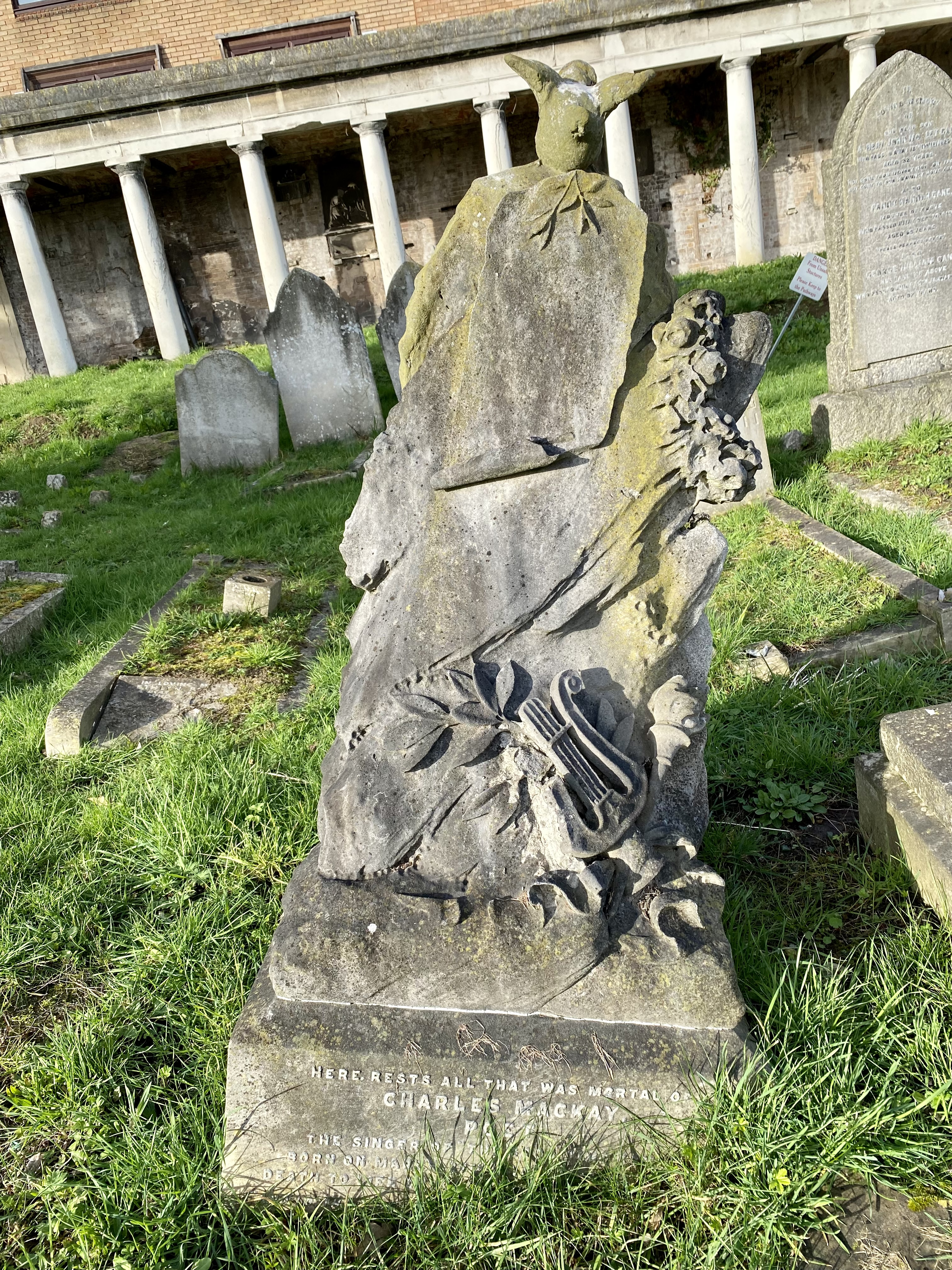
Mackay's grave at Kensal Green Cemetery

Mackay visited North America in the 1850s, publishing his observations as Life and Liberty in America: or Sketches of a Tour of the United States and Canada in 1857–58 (1859). During the American Civil War he returned there as a correspondent for The Times, in which he was the first to publish the news of the Fenian conspiracy.

Mackay had the degree of LL.D. from the University of Glasgow in 1846. He was a member of the Percy Society. He died in London.

== Works ==
TELL me, ye wingéd winds,
That round my pathway roar,
Do ye not know some spot
Where mortals weep no more?
Some lone and pleasant dell,
Some valley in the west,
Where, free from toil and pain,
The weary soul may rest?
The loud wind dwindled to a whisper low,
And sighed for pity as it answered, – “No.”

Tell me, thou mighty deep,
Whose billows round me play,
Know’st thou some favored spot,
Some island far away,
Where weary man may find
The bliss for which he sighs, –
Where sorrow never lives,
And friendship never dies?
The loud waves, rolling in perpetual flow,
Stopped for a while, and sighed to answer, –
“No.”

— From the "Tell me, ye winged winds" poem by Charles Mackay

Mackay published Songs and Poems (1834), a History of London, The Thames and its Tributaries or, Rambles Among the Rivers (1840), Extraordinary Popular Delusions and the Madness of Crowds (1841).

Mackay wrote a historical romance titled Longbeard, about the medieval rebel William Fitz Osbert. He is also remembered for his Gaelic Etymology of the Languages of Western Europe and the later Dictionary of Lowland Scotch in which he presented his "fanciful conjectures" that "thousands of English words go back to Scottish Gaelic". The linguist Anatoly Liberman has described MacKay as an "etymological monomaniac" commenting that "He was hauled over the coals by his contemporaries and never taken seriously during his lifetime". In 1877, Mackay published his two-volume Forty Years' Recollections of Life, Literature, and Public Affairs. From 1830 to 1870 (London: Chapman & Hall). In volume 2, Mackay describes a journey he made to Famine Ireland in 1849 (pp. 2:76–148).

His fame chiefly rested upon his songs, some of which, including "Cheer Boys Cheer", were set to music by Henry Russell in 1846, and had an astonishing popularity. Some popular poems include "You have no enemies, you say?" and "Who shall be fairest?"

Mackay also authored a book in 1885 on the Founding Fathers of the United States titled The Founders of the American Republic: A History and Biography that included profiles on George Washington, John Adams, Thomas Jefferson, Benjamin Franklin, and James Madison.
