= Marie Corelli =

English novelist (1855–1924)

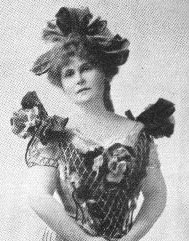
- Corelli in 1909
- Born: Mary Mackay; 1 May 1855; London, England, United Kingdom of Great Britain and Ireland
- Died: 21 April 1924 (aged 68); Stratford-upon-Avon, England, United Kingdom
- Occupation: Novelist
- Relatives: Charles Mackay (father)
- Writing career
- Genres: Gothic, Fantasy, Scientific romance

Mary Mackay (1 May 1855 – 21 April 1924), also called Minnie Mackey and known by her pseudonym Marie Corelli (/kəˈrɛli/, also UK: /kɒˈ-/, US: /kɔːˈ-, koʊˈ-/), was an English novelist.

From the appearance of her first novel A Romance of Two Worlds in 1886, she became a bestselling fiction-writer; her works were largely concerned with Christianity, reincarnation, astral projection and mysticism. Despite her many distinguished patrons, she was often ridiculed by critics. Corelli lived her later years in Stratford-upon-Avon, whose historic buildings she fought hard to preserve.

== Life and writings ==
=== Early life ===
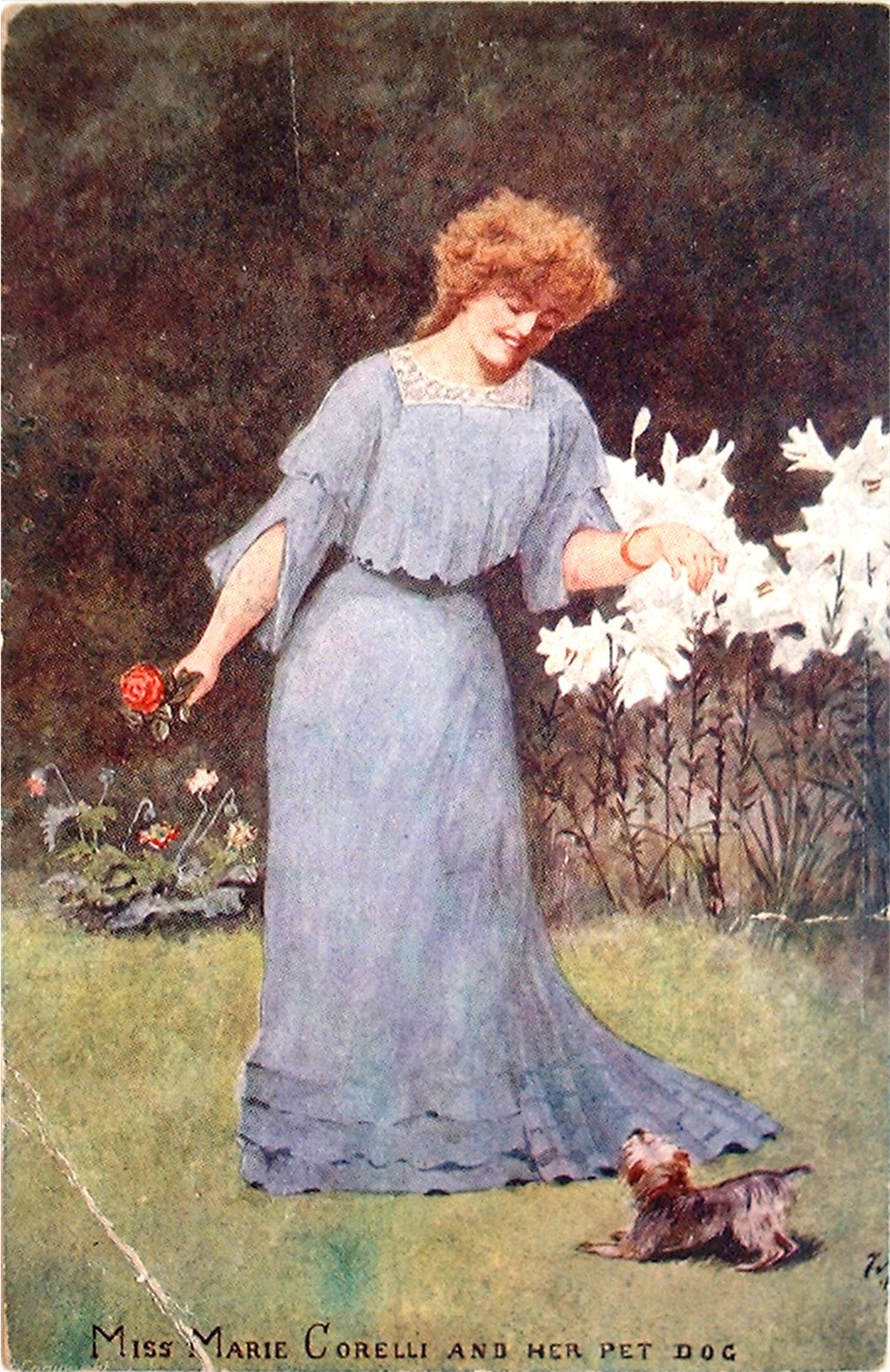
Miss Marie Corelli and her pet dog

Mary Mills was born in London to Mary Elizabeth Mills, a servant of the Scottish poet and songwriter Dr Charles Mackay, her biological father, who was married to another woman at the time of young Mary's conception. After his first wife died, he married Mary Elizabeth, whereupon their daughter Mary took the "Mackay" surname. For the rest of her life, Mary / Marie would attempt to conceal her illegitimacy, and to that end disseminated a number of romantic falsehoods about her parentage and upbringing, including stories of adoption or descent from the Italian nobility. Her unreliability as a narrator complicates the task of reconstructing her biography. Recent research suggests that Corelli may even have been adopted by Mackay and Mills from another family, the Codys.

In 1866, eleven-year-old Mary was sent to a Parisian convent (or in some accounts, an English school staffed by nuns) to further her education. She returned home four years later in 1870.

=== Career ===
Mackay began her career as a musician, giving piano recitals and adopting the name Marie Corelli for her billing. Eventually she turned to writing, beginning in 1872 with poems published in The Cosmopolitan under the pseudonym 'Rosalind'; her first novel, A Romance of Two Worlds, was published in 1886. In her time, she was the most widely read author of fiction. Her works were collected by Winston Churchill, Randolph Churchill, and members of the British royal family, among others. Yet although sales of Corelli's novels exceeded the combined sales of popular contemporaries, including Arthur Conan Doyle, H. G. Wells, and Rudyard Kipling, critics often derided her work as "the favourite of the common multitude".

She faced criticism from the literary elite for her allegedly melodramatic writing. In The Spectator, Grant Allen called her "a woman of deplorable talent who imagined that she was a genius, and was accepted as a genius by a public to whose commonplace sentimentalities and prejudices she gave a glamorous setting." James Agate represented her as combining "the imagination of a Poe with the style of an Ouida and the mentality of a nursemaid."

A recurring theme in Corelli's books is her attempt to reconcile Christianity with reincarnation, astral projection, and other mystical ideas. She was associated at some point with the Fraternitas Rosae Crucis; a Rosicrucian and mystical organization, and her books were a part of the foundation of today's corpus of esoteric philosophy. Her portrait was painted by Helen Donald-Smith.

Corelli famously had little time for the press. In 1902, she wrote to the editor of The Gentlewoman to complain that her name had been left out of a list of the guests in the Royal Enclosure at the Braemar Highland Gathering, saying she suspected this had been done intentionally. The editor replied that her name had indeed been left out intentionally, because of her own stated contempt for the press and for the snobbery of those wishing to appear in "news puffs" of society events. Both letters were published in full in the next issue.

The writer also gained some fame after her letter on the curse of the Pharaohs to New York World was published. Corelli claimed that she had warned George Herbert, 5th Earl of Carnarvon (one of the finders of the tomb of Tutankhamun) about the "dire punishment" likely to occur to those who rifle Egyptian tombs, claiming to cite an ancient book that indicated that poisons had been left after burials.

=== Personal life ===
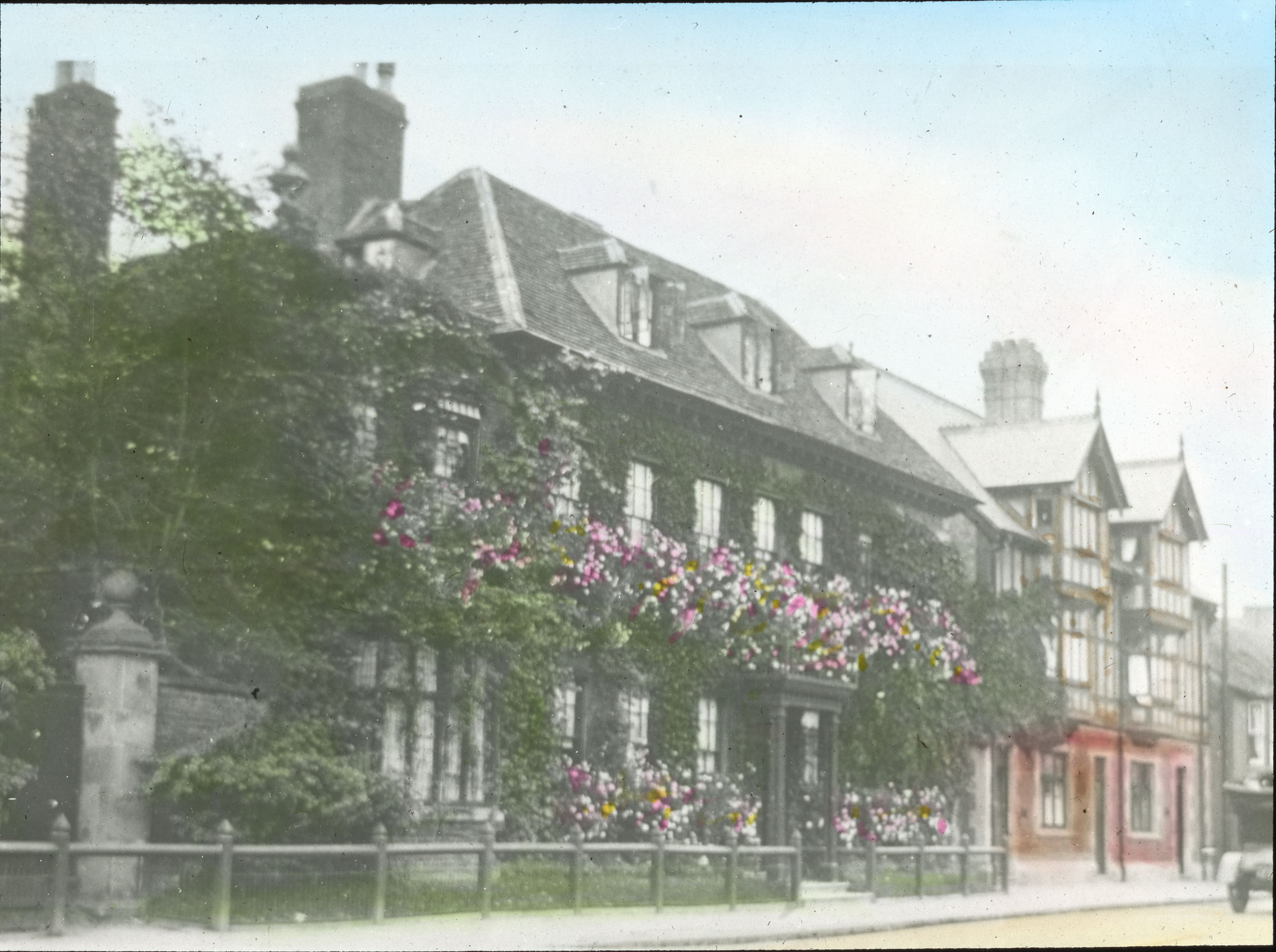
Corelli lived and died in Stratford-upon-Avon, 1901–1924. Her house, "Mason Croft", is now the home of the Shakespeare Institute. Mason Croft in 1913.

Corelli spent her final years in Stratford-upon-Avon. There she fought hard for the preservation of Stratford's 17th-century buildings, and donated money to help their owners remove the plaster or brickwork that often covered their original timber-framed façades. Novelist Barbara Comyns Carr mentions Corelli's guest appearance at an exhibition of Anglo-Saxon items found at Bidford-on-Avon in 1923. Corelli's eccentricity became well known. She would boat on the Avon in a gondola, complete with a gondolier, whom she had brought over from Venice. In his autobiography, Mark Twain, who had a deep dislike of Corelli, describes visiting her in Stratford and how the meeting changed his perception.

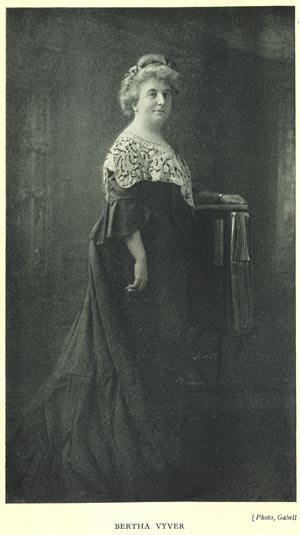
Bertha Vyver

For over forty years, Corelli lived with her companion, Bertha Vyver, to whom she left everything when she died. She did not identify herself as a lesbian, but several biographers and critics have noted the frequent erotic descriptions of female beauty that appear in her novels, although they are expressed by men.

Corelli was known to have expressed a genuine passion for the artist Arthur Severn, to whom she wrote daily letters from 1906 to 1917. Severn was the son of Joseph Severn and close friend of John Ruskin. In 1910, she and Severn collaborated on The Devil's Motor, with Severn providing illustrations for Corelli's story. Her love for the long-married painter, her only known romantic attachment to a man, remained unrequited; in fact Severn often belittled Corelli's success.

During the First World War, Corelli's personal reputation suffered when she was convicted of food hoarding.

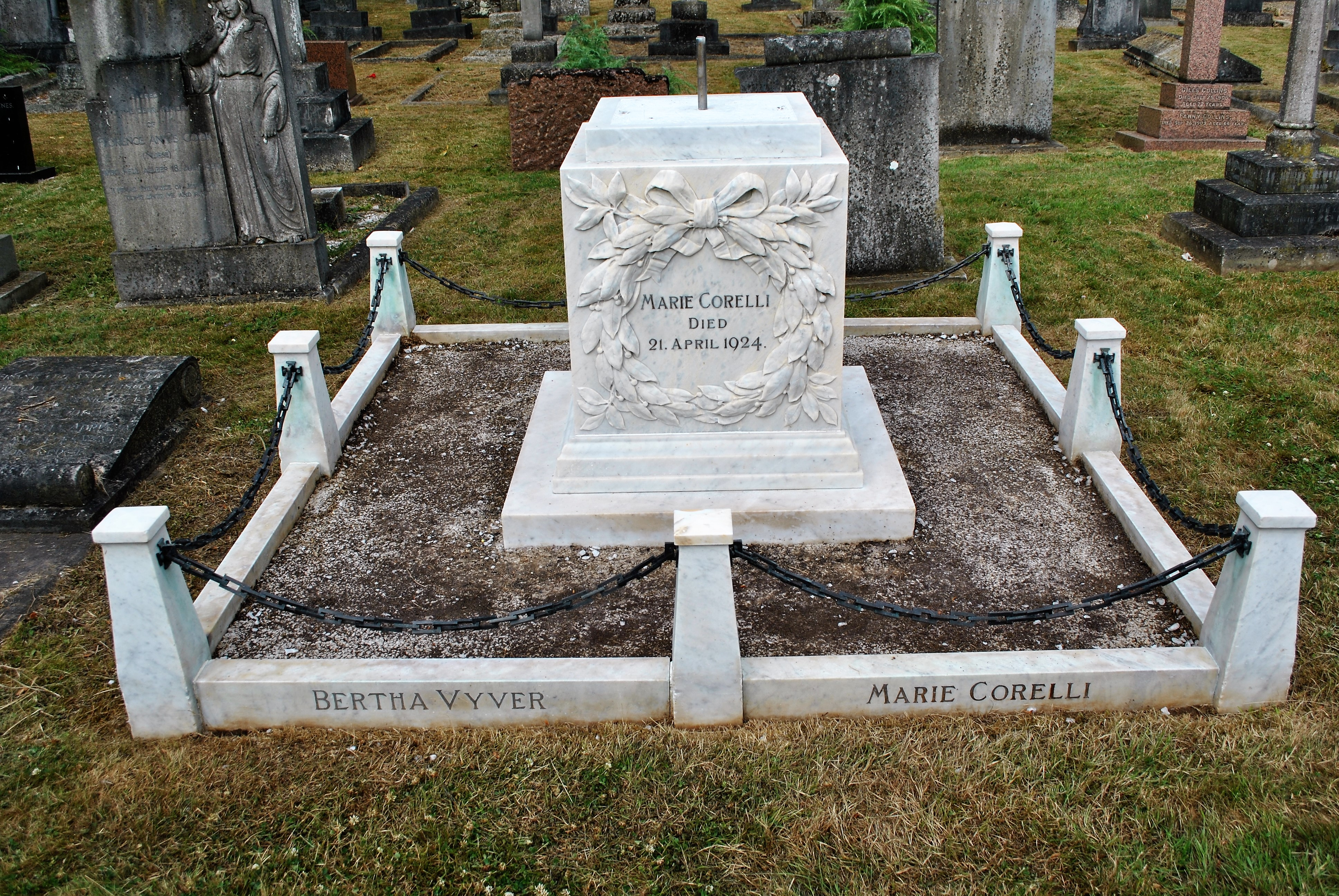
Marie Corelli died in Stratford and is buried there in the Evesham Road cemetery.

She died in Stratford and is buried there in the Evesham Road cemetery. Later Bertha Vyver was buried alongside her.

== Public image ==
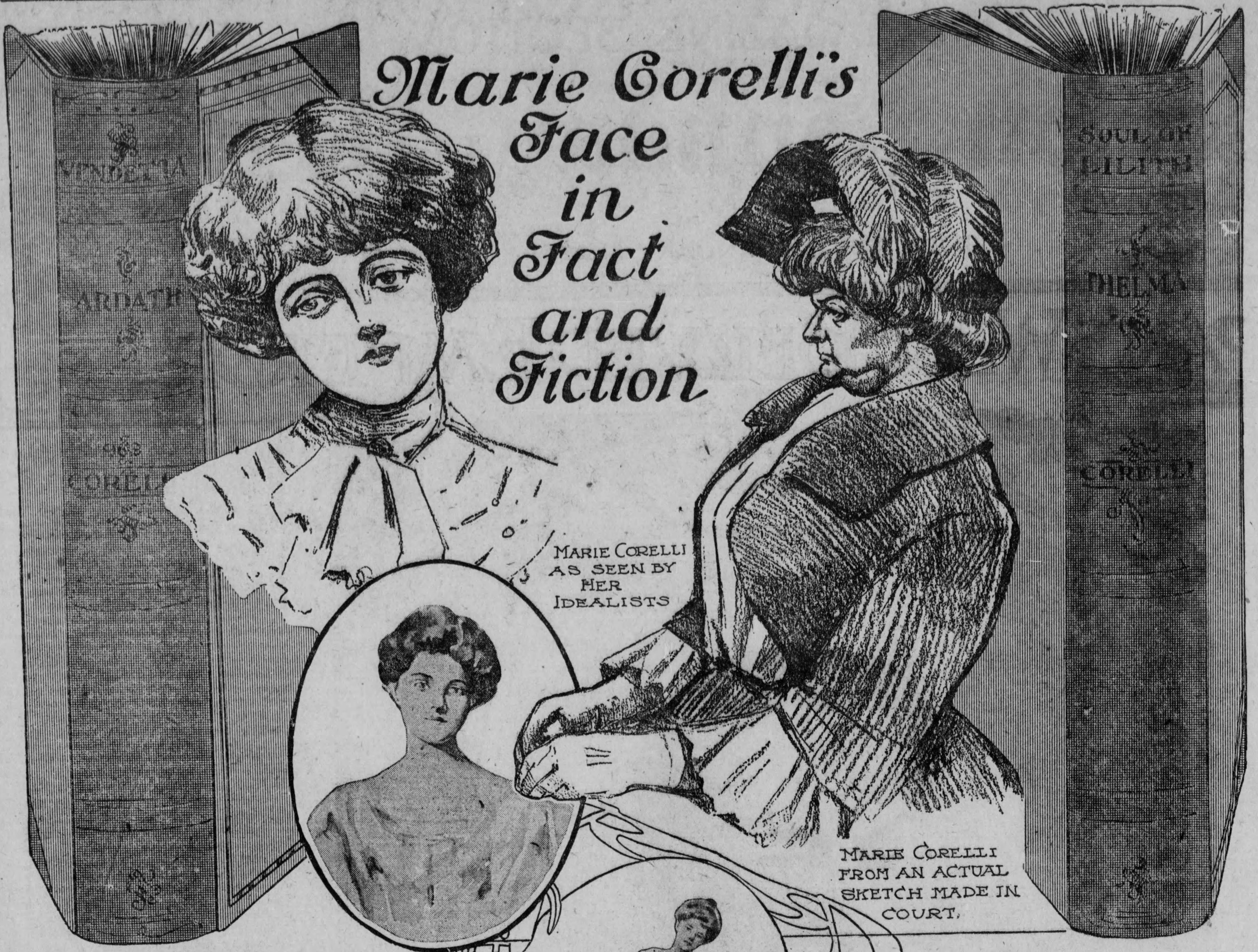
An illustration from a 1904 Boston Post story contrasting idealized images of Corelli with "an actual sketch made in court".

Corelli was known to fabricate or exaggerate many details of her life. For example, she consistently claimed (in public and in private) that she had been seventeen years old when her first novel, A Romance of Two Worlds, was published in 1886, putting her year of birth at 1868 or 1869. This was repeated in contemporary biographies, though it is now believed that she was born in 1855. When she assumed the name "Marie Corelli" at the beginning of her career, she also took on a false backstory, writing to her first publisher, George Bentley, "I am Venetian and can trace myself back to the famous musician Arcangelo Corelli", and on other occasions claimed to descend from the Doges of Venice.

Corelli avoided being seen in public, and according to biographer Brian Masters, was possessed of a "positive terror of being photographed". She finally allowed a photograph of herself to be published as the frontispiece of her 1906 novel Treasure of Heaven, though it was apparently airbrushed to depict her as "a sweet young lady in her early twenties". Around the same time, Mark Twain wrote the following description of Corelli's appearance in his diary during a visit to Stratford:

She is about fifty years old but has no grey hairs; she is fat and shapeless; she has a gross animal face; she dresses for sixteen, and awkwardly and unsuccessfully and pathetically imitates the innocent graces and witcheries of that dearest and sweetest of all ages...

== Legacy ==
Corelli is generally accepted to have been the inspiration for at least two of E. F. Benson's characters in his Lucia series of six novels and a short story.

A modern critic has written that Corelli was probably also the inspiration for "Rita's" (Eliza Humphreys's) main character in Diana of the Ephesians, which was published a year before E. F. Benson's first Lucia novel, and had been rejected by Hutchinson, which later published the "Lucia" Lucas novels.

In Chapter III of Bruce Marshall's The World, the Flesh and Father Smith, the protagonist – a Catholic priest – is in hospital, recovering from a wound. A nurse gives him a copy of Marie Corelli's Temporal Power, with the hope that the book would convert him to Protestantism. However, Father Smith finds the book "stupid and flamboyant", puts it aside and prays for Corelli, since "she really ought to have known better".

In 2007, the British film Angel, based on a book by Elizabeth Taylor, was released as a thinly veiled biography of Corelli. The film starred Romola Garai in the Corelli role and also starred Sam Neill and Charlotte Rampling. It was directed by François Ozon, who stated, "The character of Angel was inspired by Marie Corelli, a contemporary of Oscar Wilde and Queen Victoria's favourite writer. Corelli was one of the first writers to become a star, writing bestsellers for an adoring public. Today, she has been largely forgotten, even in England."

Despite falling into obscurity through the latter part of the 20th century, her novels have experienced a resurgence of interest during the 21st century.

== Works ==
=== Novels ===
- A Romance of Two Worlds (1886)
- Vendetta! (1886)
- Thelma (1887)
- Ardath (1889)
- Wormwood: A Drama of Paris (1890)
- The Soul of Lilith (1892)
- Barabbas, A Dream of the World's Tragedy (1893)
- The Sorrows of Satan (1895)
- The Mighty Atom (1896)
- The Murder of Delicia (1896)
- Ziska: The Problem of a Wicked Soul (1897)
- Jane (1897)
- Boy (1900)
- The Master-Christian (1900)
- Temporal Power: a Study in Supremacy (1902)
- God's Good Man (1904)
- The Strange Visitation of Josiah McNasson: A Ghost Story (1904)
- Treasure of Heaven (1906)
- Holy Orders, The Tragedy of a Quiet Life (1908)
- The Life Everlasting (1911)
- Innocent: Her Fancy and His Fact (1914)
- The Young Diana (1918)
- The Secret Power (1921)
- Love and the Philosopher (1923)
- Open Confession to a Man from a Woman (1925)

=== Short story collections ===
- Cameos: Short Stories (1895)
- The Song of Miriam & Other Stories (1898)
- A Christmas Greeting (1902)
- Delicia & Other Stories (1907)
- The Love of Long Ago, and Other Stories (1918)

=== Non-fiction ===
- The Modern Marriage Market (1898) (with others)
- Free Opinions Freely Expressed (1905)
- The Silver Domino; or, Side Whispers, Social & Literary (1892) (anonymous)

=== Film adaptations ===
- Vendetta (1915)
- Thelma (1916) Fox Film 1918, I.B. Davidson 1922 Chester Bennett
- Wormwood (1915) Fox Film
- Temporal Power (1916) G.B. Samuelson
- God's Good Man (1919) Stoll Films
- Holy Orders (1917) I.B. Davidson
- Innocent (1921) Stoll Films
- The Young Diana (1922) Paramount Pictures
- The Sorrows of Satan (1926) Paramount

=== Theatre adaptations ===
- Vendetta (2007) Adapted by Gillian Hiscott The Library Theatre Ltd; published by Jasper
- The Young Diana (2008) Gillian Hiscott; published by Jasper

== Bibliography ==
- Ayres, Brenda; Maier, Sarah E. (Ed.): Reinventing Marie Corelli for the twenty-first century, London, UK; New York, NY : Anthem Press, 2019, ISBN 978-1-78308-943-7
- Bigland, Eileen Marie Corelli, the woman and the legend: a biography, Jarrolds, London 1953
- Coates, T. F. G. and R. S. Warren Bell. Marie Corelli: the Writer and the Woman, George W. Jacobs & Co.: Philadelphia, 1903. Reprinted 1969 by Health Research, Mokelume Hill, CA.
- Federico, Annette R. Idol of Suburbia: Marie Corelli and Late-Victorian Literary Culture, University Press of Virginia, Charlottesville, 2000
- Masters, Brian Now Barabbas Was A Rotter: The Extraordinary Life of Marie Corelli, Hamish Hamilton, London 1978
- Ransom, Teresa The Mysterious Miss Marie Corelli: Queen of Victorian Bestsellers, Sutton, 1999
- Scott, William Stuart, Marie Corelli: the story of a friendship, London: Hutchinson, 1955
- Turner, Joanna, '“The most accomplished liar in literature”? Uncovering Marie Corelli’s Hidden Early Life', Victorian Popular Fictions 5.1 (Spring 2023): Victorian Popular Fictions 5.1 3 Turner
- Turner, Joanna, ‘Making a Name for Herself: Marie Corelli’s Self-Guided Literary Apprenticeship Via the Periodical Press’, 2023, Victorian Periodicals Review, 56:1. 110-132. DOI: Making a Name for Herself: Marie Corelli's Self-Guided Literary Apprenticeship via the Periodical Press
- Vyver, Bertha Memoirs of Marie Corelli, A. Rivers Ltd, 1930
