= George Bentley (publisher) =

English publisher

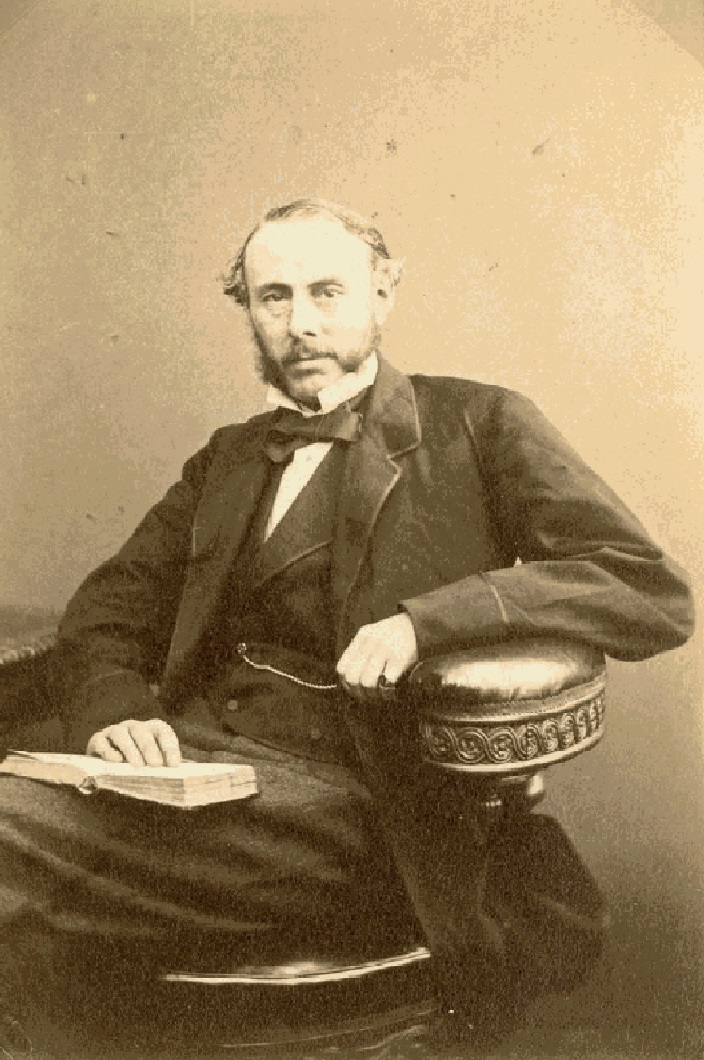
- George Bentley c.1875
- Born: 7 June 1828; Dorset Square, London, England
- Died: 29 May 1895 (aged 66); The Mere, Upton Park, Slough, England
- Occupations: Publisher; Writer
- Spouse: Anne Williams/Bentley (1826-1898)
- Children: Richard Bentley (1854-1936)
- Parent(s): Richard Bentley (1794-1871); Charlotte Botten/Bell (1800–1871)

George Bentley (7 June 1828 – 29 May 1895) was a 19th-century English publisher based in London.

Born into a family of publishers and printers, Bentley entered into partnership with his father around 1845, at a time when the firm's fortunes were in decline. Relations between father and son were sometimes difficult, and on at least one occasion George removed himself from the business. After 1857, he became more confident of his position in the firm, increasingly steering its progress. An early "find" was Wilkie Collins. During the 1860s George Bentley identified and published a number of other authors who later achieved notability. He became increasingly influential and knowledgeable as a publisher of fiction, formally taking control of the business after his father's death in 1871.

Bentley also diversified successfully into magazine publishing, exploiting the synergies available from simultaneously publishing novels serialized in monthly servings and thereafter in book form.

== Life ==
=== Early years ===
George Bentley was born "at seven o'clock in the morning of Saturday" at an address in Dorset Square, then on the western edge of London, fourth of nine recorded children of the publisher Richard Bentley (1794–1871) by his marriage to Charlotte Botten/Bell (1800–1871). An uncle was the printer-antiquarian Samuel Bentley. Two elder brothers died in infancy. George Bentley's education included a period at the school run by the nonconformist minister, John Potticary, in Blackheath, which also numbered Benjamin Disraeli among its alumni. Bentley went on to King's College London, concluding his formal education and entering his father's "publishing office" when he was 17. During the next few years he was able to travel abroad, and was in Rome in 1849 when French troops entered the city to put down a republican rebellion. Later in life he restricted his travel to occasional vacations at health resorts in the British Isles. He was a lifelong asthmatic.

=== Publishing ===
Bentley's father had launched a literary magazine, Bentley's Miscellany, in 1836 to which the son contributed positive reviews of novels by the still relatively unknown Wilkie Collins. A cause of tension between father and son arose when Richard Bentley believed he had been excluded from commercial discussions involving George Bentley and the author. Sources imply that this was not the only time that disagreements broke out between Richard and George Bentley during the early years of George's publishing career. As George became more of a driving force in the inter-generational partnership, the firm became known for its eye-catching and confidence inspiring book bindings. A later admirer was the novelist Michael Sadleir, who wrote that no rival publisher "went in so thoroughly and so persistently ... for all the panoply of glitter and colour ... [that betokened ] ... prosperity, confidence, and peace".

=== Temple Bar ===
In January 1866 Bentley's firm purchased the magazine Temple Bar for £2,750 from its proprietor-editor, George Sala, who had himself purchased it from the founder, John Maxwell, a couple of years earlier. The magazine was edited briefly by the novelist-dramatist Edmund Yates, but he resigned in July 1867. After searching unsuccessfully for a suitable successor, in November 1867 George Bentley himself took on the editorship of Temple Bar. Bentley merged the publication with the former house-journal, Bentley's Miscellany, which had been sold to William Harrison Ainsworth, but which some twenty years later had run out of steam. In 1868 Ainsworth was content to sell it back to the Bentleys. Editing Temple Bar himself, Bentley was able to make it "one of his three most valuable literary properties". Many of those contributing to the magazine were, or became, some of the best known novelists of Victorian England. Most had novels that were serialised in the monthly magazine which were subsequently published in book form. Under Bentley's editorship and direction published authors and contributors to Temple Bar included the brothers Thomas and Anthony Trollope, Rhoda Broughton, Ellen Wood, Sheridan Le Fanu, Charles Reade, Henry Kingsley, Robert Louis Stevenson, George Gissing, Arthur Conan Doyle, Maarten Maartens, and Henry James. Bentley was also able to introduce readers to translated contemporary classical works from writers including Honoré de Balzac, Alphonse Daudet, Anton Chekhov, Ivan Turgenev, Leo Tolstoy and Hans Christian Andersen.

=== Beyond novel publishing ===
Despite the success that the firm enjoyed publishing novels and with Temple Bar magazine, Bentley extended his publishing remit beyond fiction. Works of scholarship that he published included the "History of Rome" by Theodor Mommsen and the "History of Greece" by Ernst Curtius. Beyond the world of printing and publishing, he also joined the Stationers' Company and became a fellow of the Royal Geographical Society.

=== The three volume novel ===
Although the business flourished by exploiting the synergies between novel publishing and serializing the novels in Temple Bar magazine, another important pillar during the 1870s and 1880s was the Three-volume novel, a standard format during the mid nineteenth century from which published novelists deviated at their peril. Bentley had a concern that the rigidly formulaic three-volume structure could restrict literary creativity and excellence: he was on occasion content to depart from the formula. Three-volume novels were also expensive for readers to buy, creating a quasi-monopoly for commercial lending libraries. During the 1850s he attacked the commercial lending libraries' cartel by cutting the price of his own Three-volume novels to 10 shillings, less than a third of the "normal" price, hoping that in this way readers would be persuaded to buy their own copies. The strategy failed, however, and Bentley accepted defeat, buying a share in Charles Mudie's commercial lending library business when it was floated as a public company in 1864. Bentley now himself became a major supplier of standard format three-volume novels to the lending library trade. Nevertheless, by the 1880s Bentley and Mudie (who continued to participate actively in the business he had created) seem to have been on the same side in the Three-volume novels debate, and Bentleys were increasingly supplying novels in the cheaper one-volume format, both to the lending libraries and to reader-buyers.

=== Moving on ===
The 1860s was a decade of relative prosperity for the business and the father-son business relationship between George Bentley and his father seems to have been harmonious, so that it is hard to identify from the sources which of them was setting the strategy. Old Richard Bentley suffered an accident at Chepstow railway station in 1867 in which he broke a leg, and was forced to retire from the firm. By the time Richard Bentley senior died in 1871 the business had been renamed "Richard Bentley and Son". George Bentley was now 43 and during the 1880s George Bentley showed himself content, increasingly, to leave the daily running of the business to his own son, the next Richard Bentley (1854–1936). During the mid-1880s George Bentley found a time-consuming new project, having spent twenty years buying up a number of contiguous plots of land as they became available, beside Upton Park, the residential quarter of Slough where he had lived with his family since 1860. Other contiguous plots were purchased by his son, Richard, and by the mid-1880s the two of them had purchased 15 plots. They now commissioned the fashionable architect George Devey to design and build The Mere a futuristic half-timbered mansion constructed using cavity walls and double glazed windows. Possibly the most innovative feature of the house was the elaborate hot and cold piped water supply. Robert Patten describes the house, which was named "The Mere", admiringly as "a refuge from the fierce cost-cutting competition of late Victorian publishing".

=== Final years ===
After moving into it in 1887, George Bentley ran his publishing business from his new home, also devoting increasing energy to meteorology which became a consuming interest during the final part of his life, and one that was taken up keenly by his son Richard after he died. By the time George Bentley died at The Mere, of "angina pectoris" at the end of May 1895, the publishing business had become more cut-throat and less lucrative. The Bentleys' business was valued at £20,000 in a valuation which included a significant element for "goodwill", but George's son nevertheless sold the business in 1898 to MacMillans for just £8,000. George Bentley was survived by his widow by less than three years. His son, Richard Bentley lived on at The Mere estate till 1936. This Richard Bentley married in 1905 a cousin, Lucy Rosamond Bentley. George's posthumously acquired daughter-in-law, Lucy, lived on at the house till 1961, when the "35 room mansion" was sold. Today it serves as the headquarters of the National Foundation for Educational Research.

== Personal ==
George Bentley married Anne Williams from Aberystwyth at St. James's, Westminster in 1853 and the two of them set up home together on the edge of Regent's Park, a few minutes from the Bentley family home in Dorset Square. To the west of London, Slough had boasted a direct rail connection to London since 1840, and in 1860 the Bentleys relocated to 2 East Villas at Upton Park, a modern housing development at Slough where they lived together till 1887, when they moved to a larger house which they had built less than a mile away. In the meantime the couple's only recorded son, another Richard Bentley, had been born in north London in May 1854.
