= Richard Bentley (publisher) =

English publisher and editor (1794-1871)

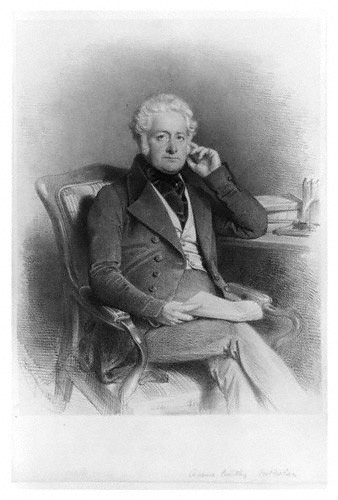
- Lithograph portrait by Charles Baugniet, 1844
- Born: 24 October 1794; London, England
- Died: 10 September 1871 (aged 76); Ramsgate, England
- Education: St Paul's School, London
- Occupation: publisher
- Spouse: Charlotte Botten (m. 1823)

Richard Bentley (24 October 1794 – 10 September 1871) was a 19th-century English publisher born into a publishing family. He started a firm with his brother in 1819. Ten years later, he went into partnership with the publisher Henry Colburn. Although the business was often successful, publishing the famous "Standard Novels" series, they ended their partnership in acrimony three years later. Bentley continued alone profitably in the 1830s and early 1840s, establishing the well-known periodical Bentley's Miscellany. However, the periodical went into decline after its editor, Charles Dickens, left. Bentley's business started to falter after 1843 and he sold many of his copyrights. Only 15 years later did it begin to recover.

== Early life ==
Bentley came from a publishing family that stretched back three generations. His father, Edward Bentley, and his uncle, John Nichols, published the General Evening Post, and Nichols also published the Gentleman's Magazine. Richard Bentley was born in Fetter Lane, Fleet St, in London in 1794. He attended St Paul's School. Richard and his brother, Samuel (1785–1868), both trained in publishing and in 1819 established their own firm in Dorset Street. (The Library of Congress identifies publisher name "S. and R. Bentley", variant "S. & R. Bentley", LCCN: nr2002-014818. That is the first of four Bentley publisher names formally identified. See the footer.) The Bentley firm, according to the Dictionary of National Biography entry on Bentley, "became arguably the finest printers in London". They were the first to prominently feature wood-engraved illustrations.

In 1823, Bentley married Charlotte Botten (1800–1871), daughter of Thomas Botten by his wife, Kezia Francis. They had nine children, one of whom, their eldest surviving son, George Bentley (1828–1895), joined his father in the printing business.

== "Henry Colburn and Richard Bentley" ==
On 3 June 1829, Bentley signed a partnership agreement with Henry Colburn. Colburn was in financial trouble and owed the Bentleys money. Rather than see him default, the two firms agreed to merge, with the agreement favouring Colburn. Over the course of a trial three-year period, Bentley was obliged to invest £2,500, find new manuscripts to publish, and act as bookkeeper. He would, in return, receive two-fifths of the profits. Colburn, on the other hand, provided three-fifths of the capital and received three-fifths of the profits. The two would make publishing decisions together. If the partnership failed before three years had passed, Bentley would be obliged to buy out Colburn for £10,000, with Colburn agreeing to publish only what he had published before the agreement. The new firm, Henry Colburn and Richard Bentley, which lasted a little over three years, was located at 8 New Burlington Street.

The firm was generally successful, primarily because they "catered to public taste". They fed the market for silver fork novels, including Benjamin Disraeli's The Young Duke (1831) and works by Catherine Gore. Furthermore, almost all their novels were three-deckers, the length preferred by circulating libraries. Another element behind their success was their advertising, on which they spent £27,000 in the three years of the firm's existence.

Not all of their ventures were successful, however. Among the notable failures were three series aimed at the increasing mass audiences: the National Library of General Knowledge, the Juvenile Library, and the Library of Modern Travels and Discoveries. Almost half the 55,750 copies of the National Library had to be sold as remainders, at a loss of almost five shillings per volume. The Juvenile Library lost the firm £900 and only three volumes were published. The Travels and Discoveries series was never published. The firm also rejected the manuscript of Sartor Resartus, by the then unknown Thomas Carlyle.

=== Standard Novels series ===
In February 1831 the firm also began publishing one-volume versions of novels that had previously been available only in three-decker form. They published novels whose copyright they owned and bought up the copyright to other novels. Colburn and Bentley's "Standard Novels series" became "a landmark in nineteenth-century publishing". Because each volume was only six shillings instead of a guinea and a half (i.e. 31s 6d), novels were suddenly available to a much wider audience than previously. Furthermore, the firm owned the copyright to the novels, making the profits of the enterprise entirely theirs. James Fenimore Cooper's The Pilot was the first novel in the series. The two publishers solicited revisions from living authors, sometimes forcing them to shorten their works so that they would fit into a single volume. Colburn and Bentley published the first 19 volumes together. The series would eventually be published over 24 years and include 126 volumes. These included "the first inexpensive reprints of Jane Austen's fiction" and many American titles. The series was extraordinarily successful. In its first year, it made the firm £1,160.

=== End of partnership ===
By 1831, the partnership between Bentley and Colburn was fraying. The cost of buying copyrights was mounting and the firm was in financial chaos. By early 1832, Bentley and Colburn were no longer speaking to each other and their dispute had to be mediated by lawyers and clerks. On 1 September 1832, Bentley and Colburn signed a settlement in which Bentley agreed to buy the firm for £1,500, keep the office on New Burlington Street, and rename the business "Richard Bentley". He paid Colburn £5,580 for materials and copyrights owned by the firm, including the Standard Novels series. Colburn agreed to a series of restrictions on his publications, an agreement which he violated almost immediately. The partnership was officially dissolved with effect from 31 August 1832.

== "Richard Bentley" ==
Bentley and Colburn became bitter rivals in the years that followed the dissolution of their partnership, publishing similar series and trying to undersell each other. In 1833, Bentley was appointed Publisher in Ordinary to the king, but it brought him no business.

Bentley had several successes early in his solo enterprise. For example, he bought the copyright to Edward Bulwer-Lytton's The Last Days of Pompeii (1834), which sold well for over 20 years. He also published William Harrison Ainsworth's Rookwood in 1834, which was a best-seller and released in two further editions. Bentley published the works of well-known authors such as Leigh Hunt, William Hazlitt, Maria Edgeworth and Frances Trollope, and was the English publisher of Hans Christian Andersen's fairy tales. Bentley's firm gained a "reputation for quality". He often published the same work in several formats. For example, Ainsworth's Jack Sheppard was serialised in Bentley's Miscellany from January 1839 to February 1840, published as a three-decker book in October 1839, and reprinted in one volume and as a serialisation in 1840.

Bentley also published important Continental writers, including Alphonse de Lamartine, Chateaubriand, Louis-Adolphe Thiers, François Guizot, Leopold von Ranke and Theodor Mommsen.

Bentley hosted dinners at his home during the 1830s and 1840s, at which important writers and critics gathered.

=== Bentley's Miscellany ===
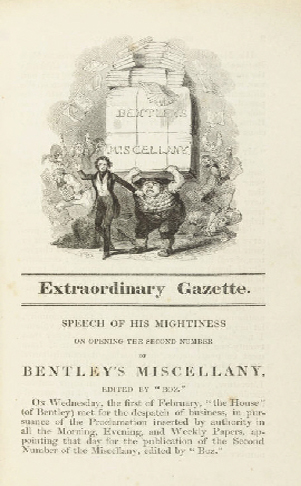
Bentley's Miscellany, second edition of March 1837

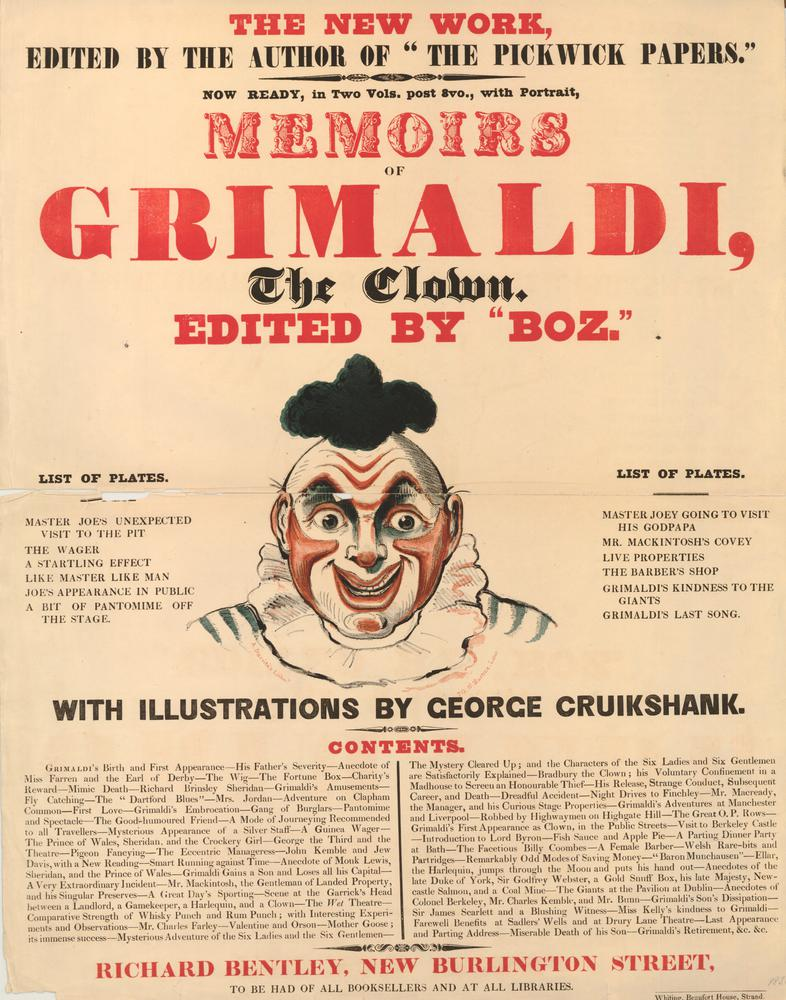
1838 Poster advertisement for Memoirs of Grimaldi, originally by Joseph Grimaldi but heavily revised by Dickens, under his regular nom de plume, "Boz", and published by Bentley

In October 1836, Bentley entered the periodical market. He founded Bentley's Miscellany, which first appeared in January 1837, and selected Charles Dickens, known at the time for his Pickwick Papers, as editor. Dickens also agreed to contribute a serialised novel to the periodical and to sell two novels to Bentley. The periodical was "an immediate success" – 11,000 copies were sold in 1837 – largely as a result of the serialisation of Dickens's Oliver Twist, illustrated by George Cruikshank. Dickens became increasingly frustrated at the initial terms of his contract, which he felt paid him too little. He eventually negotiated an increase to his editorial salary from £40 per month (£20 to edit and 20 guineas to write an article) to £1,000 per year, including additional payments for his novels. The two renegotiated the contract nine times. As Wallins explains, "Through nearly four years of negotiations Bentley remained calm in public; privately, he railed against Dickens's constant complaints but then backed down, delayed deadlines, and provided his author with more money as it was demanded. Bentley recognized that an unhappy author was an unproductive author." In the end, Dickens paid Bentley £2,250 to buy out the rest of his contract and to purchase the copyright to Oliver Twist.

=== Financial trouble ===
Ainsworth succeeded Dickens as editor. Under his guidance, the circulation of the periodical "decreased dramatically" and costs increased. Among the contributors during this period was the novelist and traveller Isabella Frances Romer. The quality of the novels declined and the number of reviews rose. During the 1840s and 1850s, Bentley used the periodical primarily to puff his own publications. American literature was highlighted, including Edgar Allan Poe's "The Fall of the House of Usher" (1840).

Around 1843, the book trade fell off significantly in England. For the next 20 years, Bentley struggled to keep his firm afloat amidst increasing competition, legal problems, and poor business choices. For example, he started a sixpenny newspaper, Young England, that ended after fourteen issues. Other firms introduced series similar to the Standard Novels series, but cheaper. Bentley tried to compete by publishing two new, cheap series – Bentley's Shilling Series and the Parlour Bookcase – but these were not very successful. Neither had over 25 volumes whereas the competition had almost 300. In 1853, Bentley tried to reduce the price of some of his books to increase the number sold, but this tactic failed. Bentley finally resorted to selling copyrights and large numbers of remaindered books to pay his debts. In 1853, as the economy worsened as a result of the Crimean War, he was forced to sell Bentley's Miscellany to its editor, Ainsworth. By 1855, Bentley's finances were in such dire straits that his firm was in danger of failing. In 1857 Bentley auctioned off copyrights, plates, steel etchings and remainders to pay debts.

Changes in copyright law also affected Bentley's firm. Decades earlier, he had bought the English copyright for many American novels and made steady profits from the publication of these works. However, in 1849, all rights to foreign copyrights were extinguished, and other firms began to publish cheap editions of the works Bentley had paid to publish. In 1851, the Lords' decision was reversed, but by then Bentley had lost approximately £17,000.

George Bentley joined his father's firm in 1845, but he did not become an active partner until the 1850s.

=== Recovery ===
As the firm became financially stable again, Bentley began more projects. In 1859, Bentley attempted to establish Bentley's Quarterly Review as a competitor to the Edinburgh Review and the Quarterly Review. As editors, he signed on John Douglas Cook, William Scott and Robert Cecil. The first issue appeared in February, but it did not sell well, despite being well received by critics. Only four issues were published. Patten describes Bentley as "slow and imitative of other publishers", with "a strong bourgeois streak that prompted him to stand upon his proprietorial and editorial dignity, even when he lost contributors through his stubbornness", and describes his launch of the review as an "overreaching" that is typical of him.

The firm slowly became successful again. From June 1859 to May 1860, Bentley published a series of "Tales from Bentley" that reprinted stories from Bentley's Miscellany, which was a success. The publication of Ellen Wood's East Lynne (1861), which sold out four editions in six months, helped dramatically. After 20 years, the book had sold 110,250 copies.

In January 1866 Bentley purchased Temple Bar Magazine; his son, George, became the editor, a position which he held until 1895. Two years later, Ainsworth ran into financial trouble with Bentley's Miscellany and the Bentleys bought it back for £250. They merged it with Temple Bar, bringing together what Wallins calls "perhaps the finest roster of contributors to any periodical at the time", which included Anthony Trollope, Wilkie Collins, Arthur Conan Doyle, George Gissing and Robert Louis Stevenson.

== Decline and death ==
In 1867, Bentley experienced a "severe accident" at Chepstow railway station that left him "shaken and enfeebled" (he broke his leg after falling from the platform at the railway station). George took over the day-to-day business of the firm. Bentley died on 10 September 1871 at Ramsgate, at which time his firm was renamed "Richard Bentley and Son". George Bentley was also named one of the executors of Bentley's will, along with two of his other children, Frederick Bentley and Anne Kezia Bentley. Richard Bentley was buried in the family vault in West Norwood Cemetery, London, on 18 September 1871.

According to the Dictionary of National Biography, "Bentley's major contributions to nineteenth-century publishing are the Standard Novels – freshly revised texts of major contemporary authors made affordable for the middle class; Bentley's Miscellany and Temple Bar; the quality of his author list and of his book manufacture; his introduction of high-calibre international writers to British readers; and his founding of a family publishing firm that lasted through two further generations."
