= Hal Willis =

Hal Willis is the name of:

- Hal Willis (ice hockey) (born 1946), Canadian ice hockey defenceman
- Hal Willis (singer) (1933–2015), Canadian country singer
- Hal Willis, fictional police detective of the 87th Precinct series written by Ed McBain
- Charles Robert Forrester (1803–1850), English writer who sometimes wrote under the pseudonym Hal Willis

== See also ==
- Chuck Willis (Harold Willis, 1928–1958), American rhythm and blues singer
