= Alfred Henry Forrester =

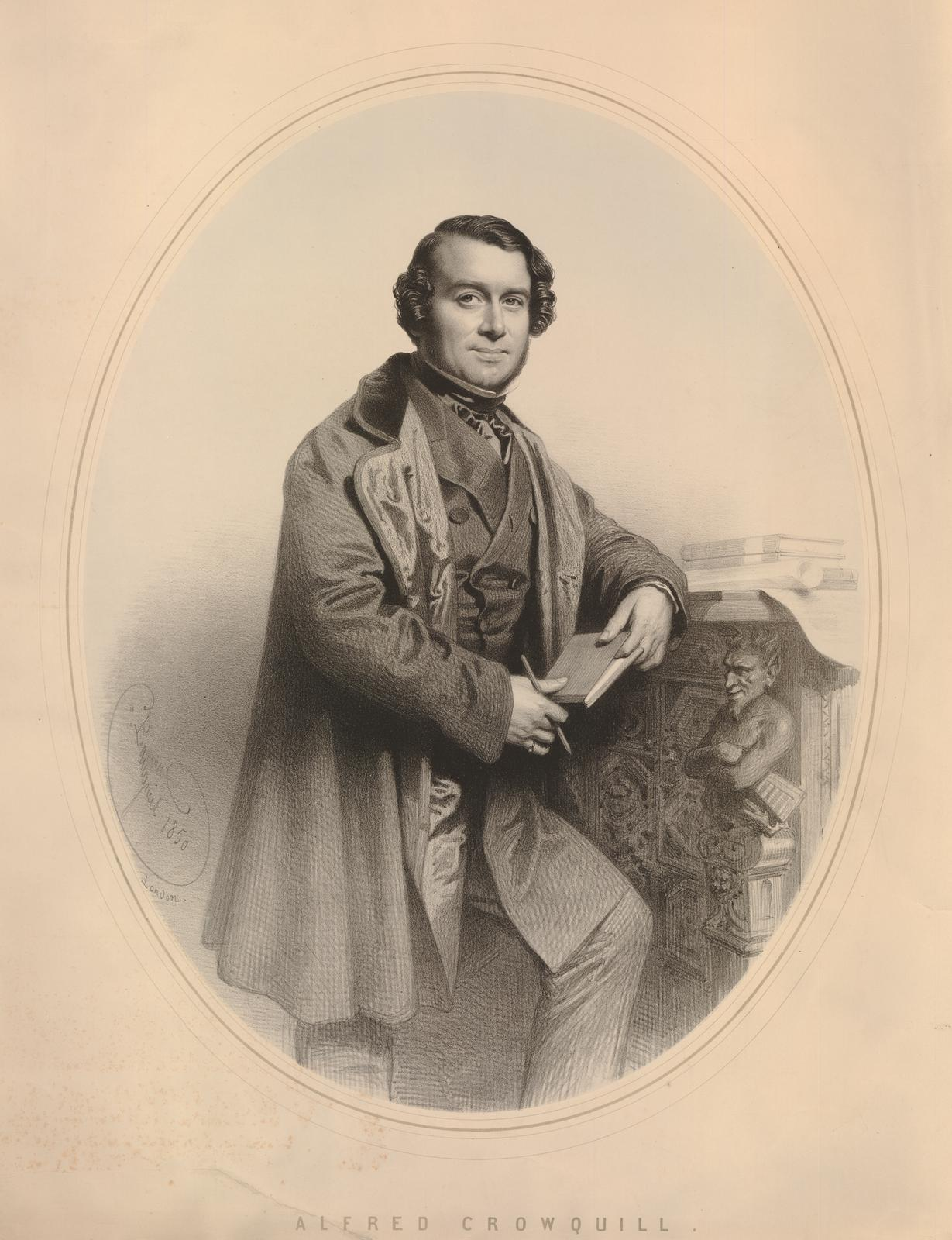
Portrait of Alfred Henry Forrester, a.k.a. Alfred Crowquill

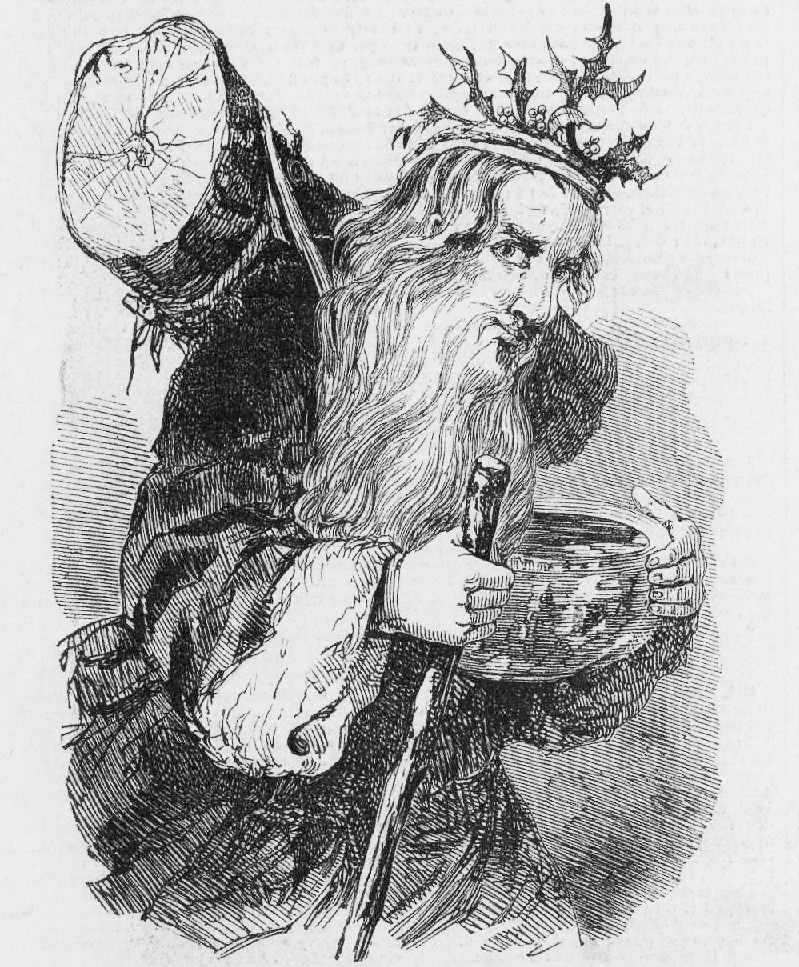
"Christmas with the Yule Log", Illustrated London News,1848

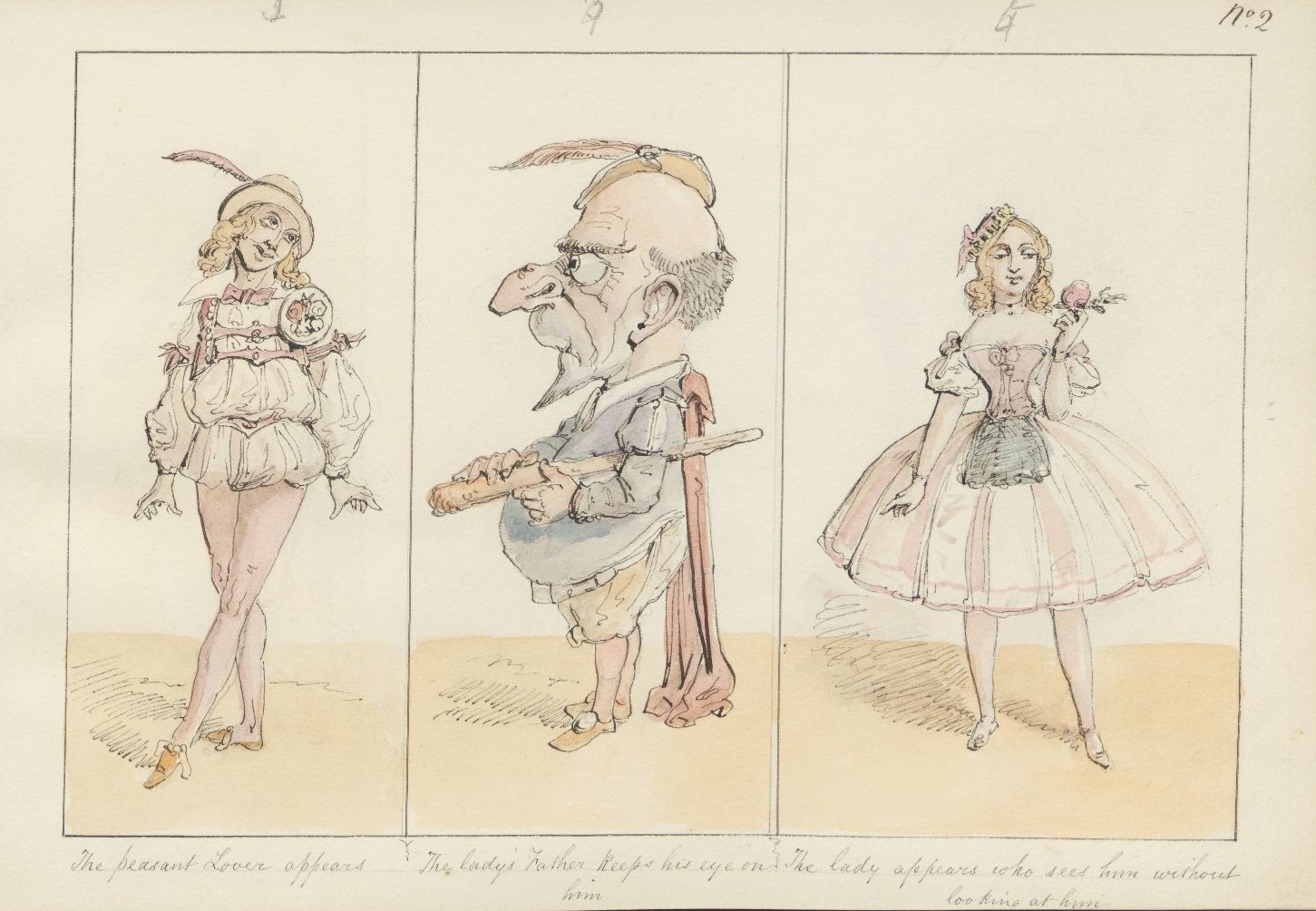
Undated illustration by "Alfred Crowquill"

Alfred Henry Forrester (10 September 1804 – 26 May 1872) was an English writer, comics artist, illustrator and artist, who was also known under the pseudonym of Alfred Crowquill.

== Biography ==
Alfred Forrester was the son of Robert Forrester of 5 North Gate, Royal Exchange, London, a public notary. Alfred Forrester also followed his father’s profession and remained in that line of work till 1839.

He discovered an aptitude for literary and artistic pursuits from an early age, and was soon associated with writing for periodical publications, including Colburn’s New Monthly Magazine, The Humorist, Bentley’s, and Punch magazine. He often wrote short tales, songs, children's stories, and occasional burlesques. He could also draw and worked on wood, etchings and caricatures using pen and ink, specialising in anthropomorphic animals, occasionally illustrating stories for his brother Charles Robert Forrester (1803–1850), who wrote under the pseudonym Hal Willis.

He also made several popular ceramics of curious flowers and contemporary subjects, including a "Memorial of the Great Exhibition of 1851" and a statuette of Wellington Bear. He illustrated plays for children in Dean & Son's series, Little Plays for Little People. In 1854 Julia Corner wrote a play for children based around the Beauty and the Beast fairy story which was illustrated by Forrester working under the name of Alfred Crowquill.

Forrester's Phantasmagoria of Fun appeared in two volumes in 1843 under his Alfred Crowquill pseudonym. It contains humorous sketches with an animal theme. His Strange Surprising Adventures of the Venerable Gooroo Simple..., consisting of comic tales set in India, appeared in 1861, again under the pseudonym Alfred Crowquill.

Forrester also illustrated the English version of "Master Tyll Owlglass" as Alfred Crowquill.

Alfred Henry Forrester was buried at West Norwood Cemetery, near London.
