= Mangnall =

Mangnall is a surname. Notable people with the surname include:

- Anthony Mangnall (born 1989), British politician
- Dave Mangnall (1905–1962), British football player and manager
- Ernest Mangnall (1866–1932), British football manager
- Richmal Mangnall (1769–1820), British schoolmistress and schoolbook author
