= Wormwood: A Drama of Paris =

1890 novel by Marie Corelli

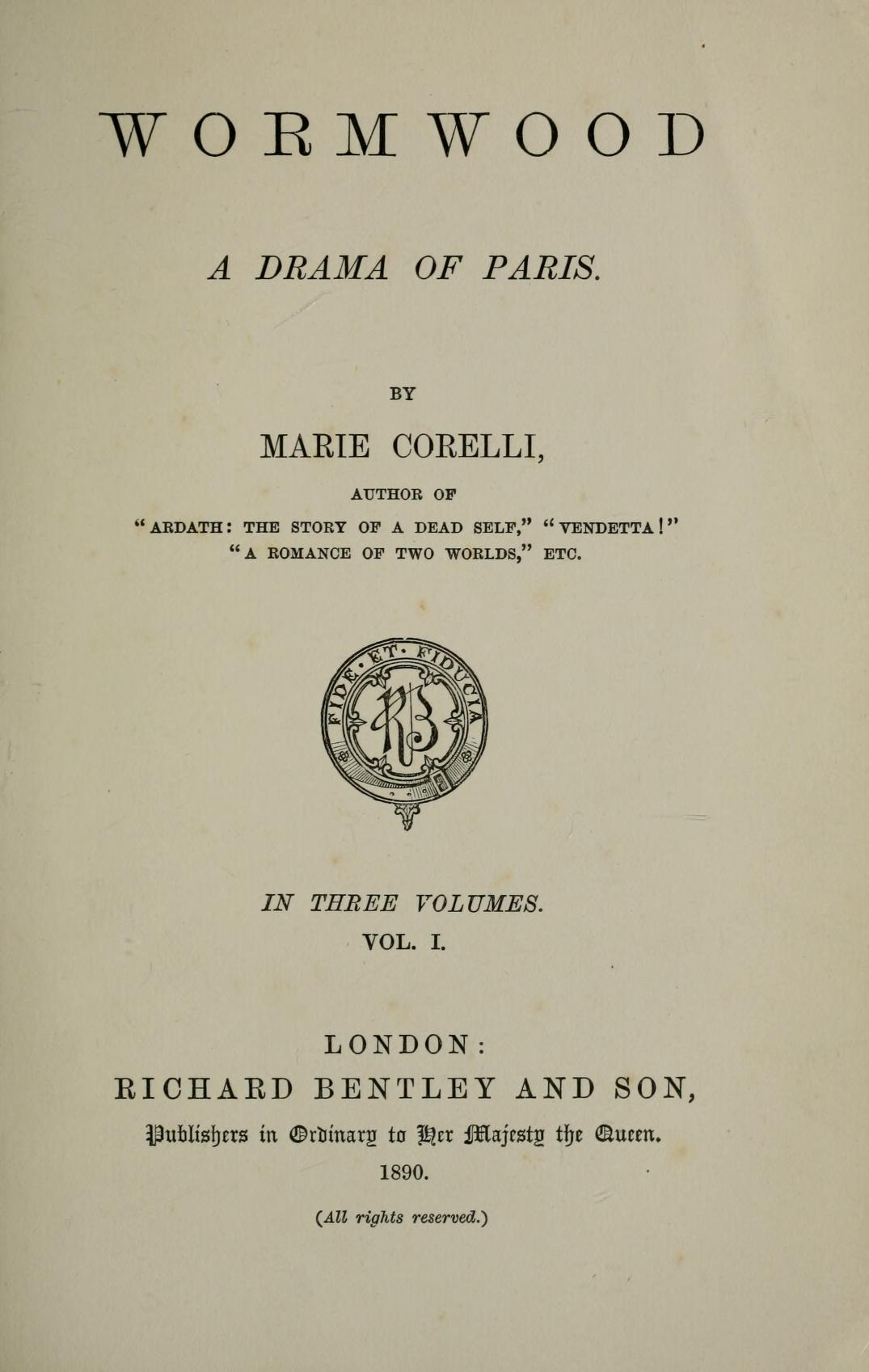
- Title page of first volume of first edition of Wormwood
- Author: Marie Corelli
- Language: English
- Publisher: George Bentley
- Publication date: 1890
- Publication place: United Kingdom
- Media type: Print (Hardcover)

Wormwood: A Drama of Paris is an 1890 novel by Marie Corelli. It tells the sensational story of a Frenchman, Gaston Beauvais, driven to murder and ruin by the potent alcoholic drink absinthe.

Like Corelli's previous four novels, Wormwood was a great commercial success. Corelli presented the story as a cautionary tale about the dangers of absinthe, and it has been implicated in bans of the spirit which later occurred in Europe and the United States. The book has also been interpreted as a condemnation of the aesthetic and decadent movements.

== Summary ==
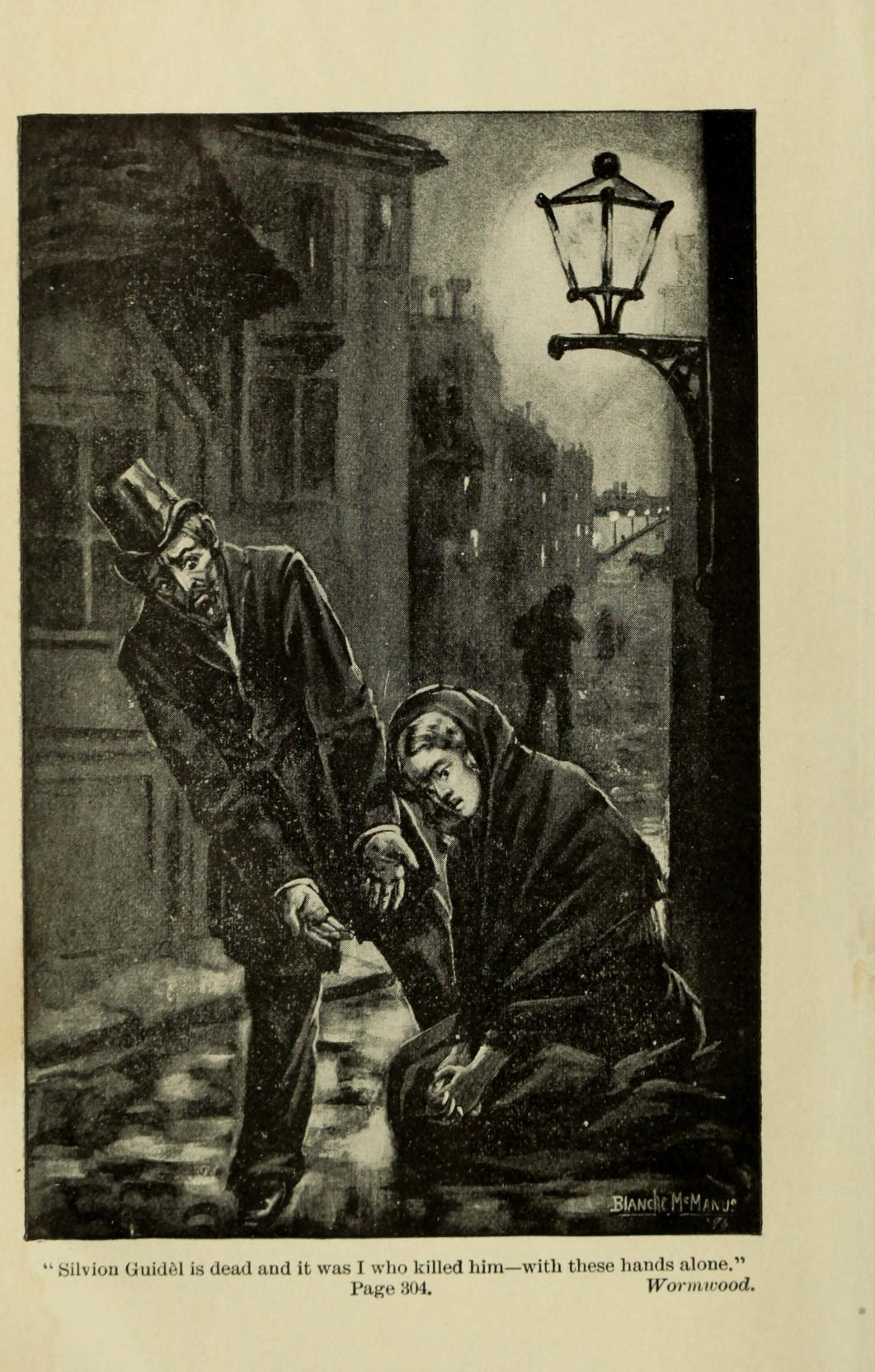
Gaston Beauvais confesses to his fiancée, Pauline, that he has murdered her lover, Silvion Guidel. Illustration from 1890 American edition published by A. L. Burt Company.

Wormwood is set in Paris. The protagonist, Gaston Beauvais, is a writer engaged to be married to Pauline de Charmilles, but shortly before their marriage, she confesses that she has fallen in love with another man, Silvion Guidel, a priest in training. Beauvais turns to alcohol as a result and shows up to their wedding day drunk on absinthe, causing a scene. He turns to drugs and further debauchery with a friend, Gessonex. When he learns that Pauline has run away, he searches for her in the slums of Paris. He comes upon Guidel, and strangles him to death, throwing his body into the Seine river. He finds Pauline and confesses that he has killed Guidel, causing her to also throw herself into the river, from the Pont Neuf bridge. Beauvais slips into unconsciousness, and when he awakens the next day, he finds himself stalked by a hallucinatory leopard. The story ends with Beauvais in the morgue with Pauline's dead body.

== Style ==
Wormwood is written in the first person, from the perspective of Gaston Beauvais. The book's dialogue and Beauvais's narration are in English, though French words and phrases are occasionally substituted, as in "Héloise showed no inclination for marriage; she was dull and distraite in the company of men". Corelli's French was occasionally marred by errors of spelling or grammar, a feature seized on by some of her detractors. Dialogue between characters on familiar terms make use of archaisms such as thou, as when Beauvais's father says to him "Amuse thyself well, Gaston! Art thou going to see the pretty Pauline this evening?". Corelli had used a similar style in the dialogue of her earlier novel Vendetta!.

== Moral themes ==
Like many of Corelli's novels, Wormwood was intended to shine light on the moral deficits of modern society—in this case, the vices of Paris, particularly in association with the aesthetic and decadent movements. The book depicts the downfall of its protagonist, the decadent writer Gaston Beauvais, as a consequence of his lifestyle. Corelli takes pains in an introductory note to separate herself from Beauvais, writing that she had "nothing whatsoever to do with the wretched 'Gaston Beauvais' beyond the portraiture of him in his own lurid colours", and the novel's text includes moralistic rants against France and French literature. Despite this, some modern literary critics have seen the book's thrilling style as co-opting decadent tropes to appeal to readers. The book also quotes "Lendemain", a poem about absinthe by Charles Cros, a recently deceased decadent poet and absinthe addict, and includes a footnote in which Corelli, in her own voice, praises Cros.

The book specifically targets absinthe, with its title being a reference to the bitter herb used in the production of the spirit. Corelli included an 'Introductory note', observing that "the open atheism, heartlessness, flippancy, and flagrant immorality of the whole modern French school of thought is unquestioned." She ascribed this in part to "the reckless Absinthe-mania, which pervades all classes, rich and poor alike", and warned that this habit might come to infect Britain. An epigraph dedicated the book "à messieurs les absintheurs de Paris, ces fanfarons du vice qui sont la honte et le désespoir de leur patrie" ("to the absinthe-drinkers of Paris, those boasters of vice who are the shame and despair of their homeland").

The novel was said to have contributed to legislation in France and Switzerland relating to alcohol, and absinthe in particular (see Absinthe § Bans). It was also said to be indirectly responsible for a ban on absinthe in the United States—in response to this, Corelli said it was "a great thing to have accomplished, to have saved a noble nation from one of the most malignant curses of modern times".

== Publication ==
Corelli sent the manuscript for Wormwood to her long-time publisher George Bentley on 12 July 1890. She intended the novel to have a more realist style than her previous works, describing it to Bentley as "a study à la Balzac". Bentley requested that she excise some of the novel's more lurid scenes, such as one of two scenes set in the morgue; privately, he referred to Wormwood in his diary as "this repulsive book of hers". Corelli signed a contract with Bentley on 1 September, receiving £100 as an advance, £300 on publication, and 6 shillings per copy after sales passed 1,500. The book was published in November 1890 in three volumes.

The first edition was, at the direction of Corelli, bound in a pale green binding similar to the colour of absinthe, and featured a serpent on the cover, and red ribbon crisscrossed on the spine, such as was found on absinthe bottles.

It was published in France under the title Absinthe.

A modern edition with extensive footnotes was published in 2004 by Broadview Press.

== Reception ==
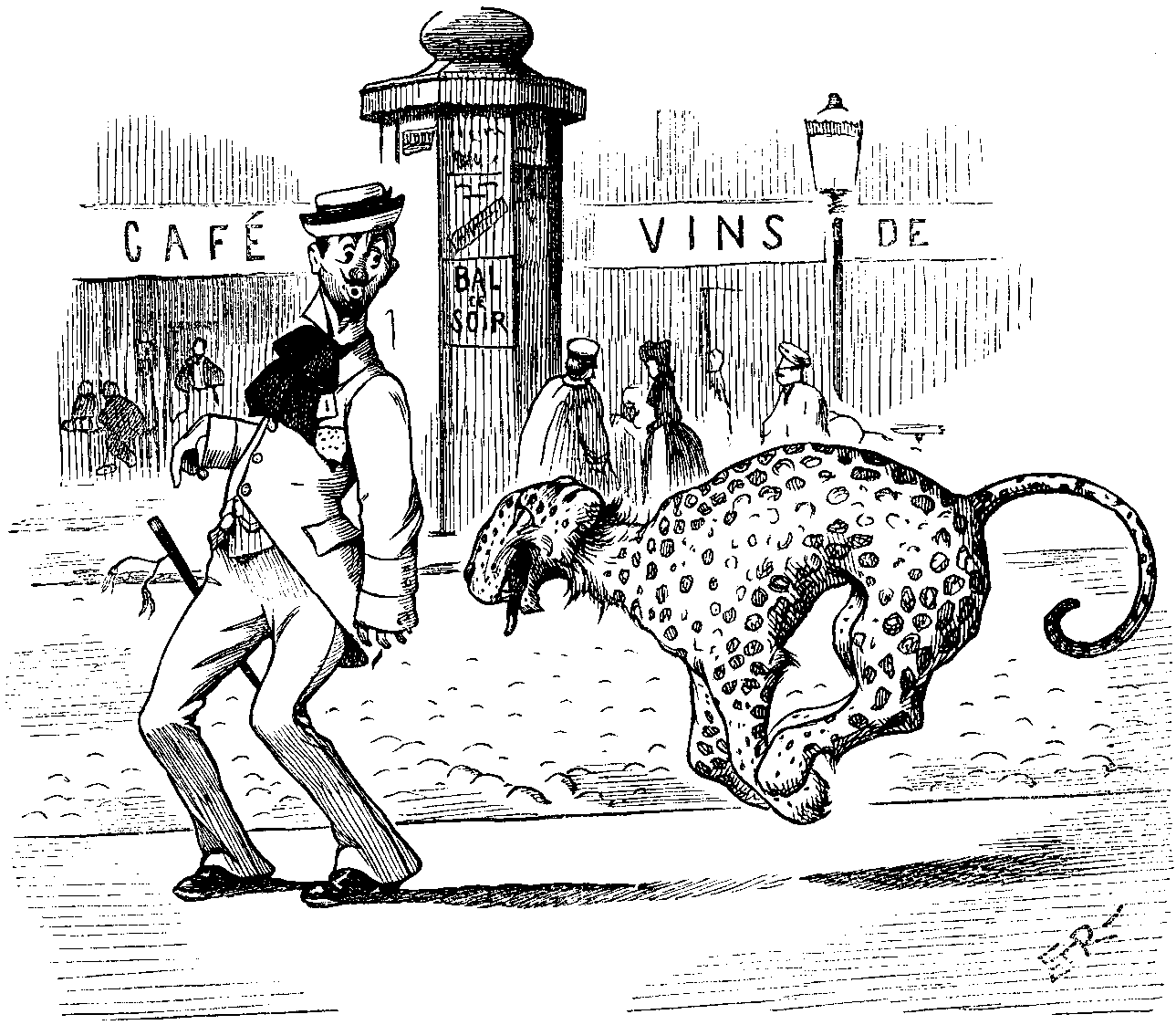
An illustration accompanying Punch's parody of Wormwood, "Germfood". The narrator, after eating a candied chestnut, hallucinates a yellow leopard which instructs him to write a book "to reform the world", written in English but sprinkled with sloppy French.

Wormwood was an immediate commercial success, with the first edition selling out in ten days. Though, according to George Bentley, some readers were so scandalised by the book that they were returning it to booksellers.

Middlebrow periodicals such as The Graphic, The Literary World, and Kensington Society praised the novel, finding it simultaneously entertaining and morally salubrious. It received somewhat positive reviews from the more highbrow literary journals The Academy and The Athenaeum, with both praising the story's realism.

Among publications which negatively reviewed the book were the Pall Mall Gazette and The Times. The Times described it as "a succession of tedious and exaggerated soliloquies, relieved by tolerably dramatic, but repulsive incidents", and criticized Corelli's writing as having a "feminine redundancy of adjectives". The Standard described the book as "repulsive". While noting that Corelli attempts to distance herself from being identified with Gaston Beauvais, the book's protagonist, the reviewer questioned the moral and artistic acceptability of an author, particularly a female author, writing from the perspective of a "vicious maniac" such as Beauvais. Corelli had anticipated such harsh criticisms, writing in private correspondence prior to Wormwood's publication, "I do not write in a ladylike or effeminate way, and for that they hate me".

Punch magazine mocked the book's style and content with a parody in an 1891 issue, as part of the magazine's "Mr. Punch's Prize Novels" series. The parody, titled "Germfood" and attributed to "Mary Morally", is an account of a Parisian man addicted to marrons glacés (a candied chestnut confection). The piece mocks Corelli's writing style, including her use of archaisms like thou and her solecistic French (for example, it quotes her narrator saying "Nous blaguons le chose."—since chose is feminine, this is grammatically incorrect, and should instead be "Nous blaguons la chose." (Note: This error occurs on pages 124–125 of the third volume of the first edition. It is corrected in later editions, such as the American edition published by A. L. Burt.)). It furthermore sends up Wormwood's melodramatic and lurid plot, with Mary Morally warning "I'll give you fits, paralytic fits, epileptic fits, and fits of hysteria, all at the same time.", and the story ending with the revelation that the narrator has inexplicably died:

The world is very evil. My father died choked by a marron. I, too, am dead—I who have written this rubbish—I am dead, and sometimes, as I walk, my loved one glides before me in aërial phantom shape, as on page 4, Vol. II. But I am dead—dead and buried—and over my grave an avenue of gigantic chestnuts reminds the passer-by of my fate: and on my tombstone it is written, "Here lies one who danced a cancan and ate marrons glacés all day. Be warned!" THE END.

== Adaptations ==
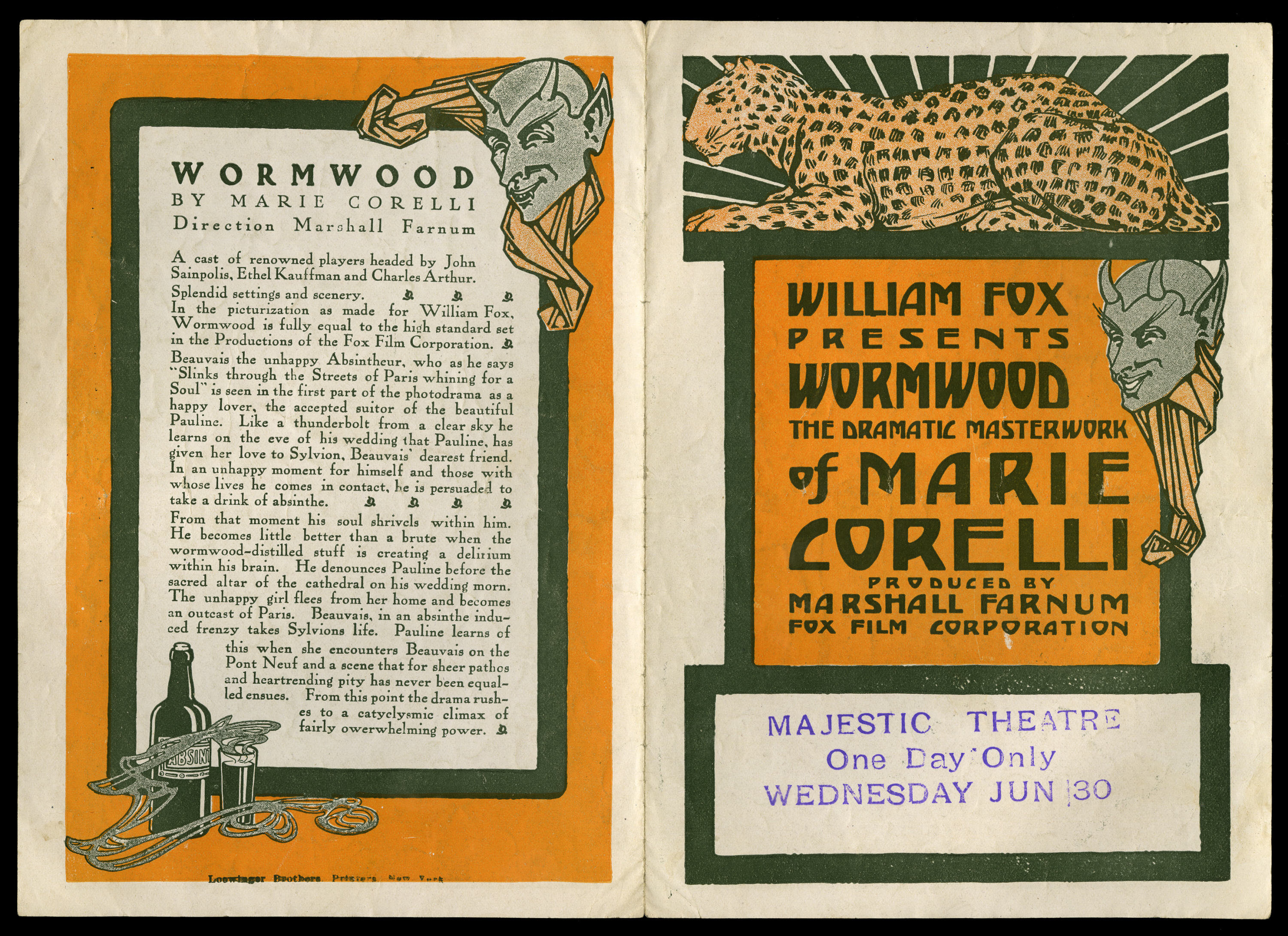
Poster for the 1915 film adaptation of Wormwood.

A theatrical adaptation, Wormwood, or the Absinthe Drinkers of Paris, by Charles W. Chase was staged across the United States around 1902–1903 as a temperance play. Chase's adaptation makes a number of modifications to the original story, including changing Silvion Guidel from a priest to a writer, adding the character of Mephisto, and a new scene set in hell. Moreover, unlike the novel, Chase gives his play a happy ending, recasting the story's most dramatic events as a dream sequence.

Wormwood was adapted into a silent film of the same name in 1915 produced by Fox Film.
