= William Thomas Lowndes =

English bibliographer

William Thomas Lowndes (c. 1798 – 31 July 1843), English bibliographer, was born about 1798, the son of a London bookseller.

His principal work, The Bibliographer’s Manual of English Literature—the first systematic work of the kind—was published in four volumes in 1834. It took Lowndes fourteen years to compile, but, despite its merits, brought him neither fame nor money. "For years Lowndes was the national British bibliography." It is regarded as a "bibliographical classic" although "pleasurably more scattershot than systematic."

Lowndes, reduced to poverty, subsequently became cataloguer to Henry George Bohn, the bookseller and publisher. In 1839 he published the first parts of The British Librarian, designed to supplement his early manual, but owing to failing health did not complete the work.

William Thomas Lowndes (1869). Henry G. Bohn (ed.). Bibliographer's Manual of English Literature. London: Bell and Daldy.
| Volume | From | To |
|---|---|---|
| Volume 1 | A (1) | C (576) |
| Volume 2 | D (577) | H (1155) |
| Volume 3 | I (1157) | O (1756) |
| Volume 4 | P (1757) | Sim (2400) |
| Volume 5 | Sim (2401) | Z (2037) |
