= Jessie Fothergill =

English novelist

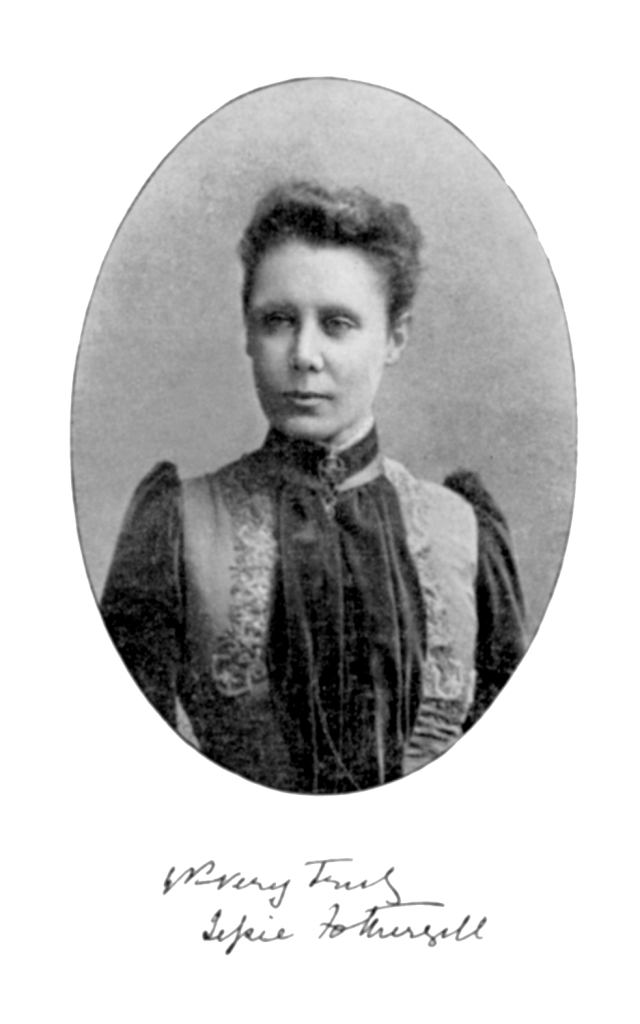
- Born: June 1851; Manchester
- Died: 28 July 1891 (aged 40); Bern
- Writing career
- Genre: Novelist

Jessie Fothergill (June 1851 – 28 July 1891) was an English novelist. Her novel The First Violin sold particularly well. Publishers initially rejected it because of themes of female adultery which they felt would reduce sales; the opposite effect occurred instead.

== Life and writings ==
Fothergill was born in June 1851 at Cheetham Hill, Manchester, the eldest child of Thomas Fothergill, a businessman in the cotton trade, and his wife Anne. He had once been a Quaker. Anne was the daughter of William and Judith Coultate of Burnley. (Jess Fothergill's sister Catherine also wrote novels, which appeared between 1883 and 1898.) The Fothergills when she was young moved to Bowdon in Cheshire, where she attended a private school, followed by a boarding school in Harrogate. Her father died in 1866, and shortly after, Jessie Fothergill, with her mother, sisters, and brothers moved to Littleborough, near Rochdale, where Jessie lived quietly, studying the life led by the cotton-mill workers: "strange uncouth people, the out-of-the-worldness of it all."

Jessie, Caroline and two friends spent 15 months in Düsseldorf, Germany, in 1874. On her return to England she published her first novel, Healey, in 1875, having already started her third novel, The First Violin (1876), which made Fothergill's name, although it was originally published anonymously to protect her family. Inspired by her 15 months studying music in Düsseldorf, it tells the story of a 17-year-old English girl who rejects the attentions of a rich landowner, to become instead a lady's companion and travel to "Elberthal" (i. e. Düsseldorf), where she can take voice lessons. The story follows her adventures and goes into detail on the artists and their lives and how music was rehearsed and performed by amateurs as well as professionals, using the German terms where appropriate.

The First Violin was rejected by two publishers because one character is a married woman who has an affair. They thought this would not be well received, but they were mistaken: considerable sales continued not only in Britain but in the United States. The story was released in serial form in Temple Bar magazine and as a three-volume novel. Also published in Temple Bar, in February 1886, were Some American Recollections, after a visit to the United States, driven partially by a desire to avoid British weather, as her lungs suffered from a medical condition.

Fothergill was a freethinker in regards to religion. A letter in the National Reformer shortly after her death confirmed that she "frequently attended the meetings of the Manchester Positivist Society", and suggested that "Her works, which are widely read in the North of England, and elsewhere, must have had a considerable influence for good in removing theological prejudices or bias, especially among women, who appear to form the majority of her readers."

== Depictions ==
Fothergill's novels largely depict life on the moorland, in the factories of Lancashire and Yorkshire; but she combined the fruits of her observation of the places where her life was mainly spent, with enthusiastic descriptions of the influence of music. "Cotton mills and music, manufacturing England and Germany" were the chief subjects of her work. Bertha Porter, in the Dictionary of National Biography, wrote, "Her plots were rather less satisfactorily devised than her studies of character, which were usually subtly and powerfully portrayed."

Fothergill gained further recommendation in 2017, because her novels were religiously agnostic. A present-day commentator writes: "Her novels often portrayed characters of dubious moral fibre, which proved popular with the reading public."

The latter years of her life were chiefly spent abroad. She passed some time in Florence and then in Rome in the winter of 1890–1891, where her final novel, Oriole's Daughter is set. It describes an illegitimate daughter's relations with her Republican father.

== Comparisons ==
As a regional novelist of the north-west, Jessie Fothergill was compared by some critics at the time with the Brontë family and with Elizabeth Gaskell. Jane Crisp compiled a bibliography of Fothergill.

Jessie Fothergill died in Bern, Switzerland, on 28 July 1891.

== Works ==
She published the following works, in London:

- Healey 1875 and 1884
- Aldyth 1876, 1877 and 1891
- The First Violin 1877, 1878 and 1879
- Probation 1879
- The Wellfields 1880 and 1881 (Holt's Leisure Hours.)
- Kith and Kin 1881 and 1882
- Made or Marred 1881 (Bentley's Empire Library)
- One of Three 1881 (Bentley's Empire Library)
- Peril, 1884
- Borderland 1886 and 1887
- The Lasses of Leverhouse 1888
- From Moor Isles, 1888 and 1894
- A March in the Ranks 1890 and 1891
- Oriole's Daughter 1893

A version of The First Violin dramatised by Sidney Bowkett, was produced at the Crown Theatre, Peckham, on 27 March 1899. Part of the same work is printed in The Library of Famous Literature, volume xx, 1900.
