= Henry George Bohn =

British publisher (1796–1884)

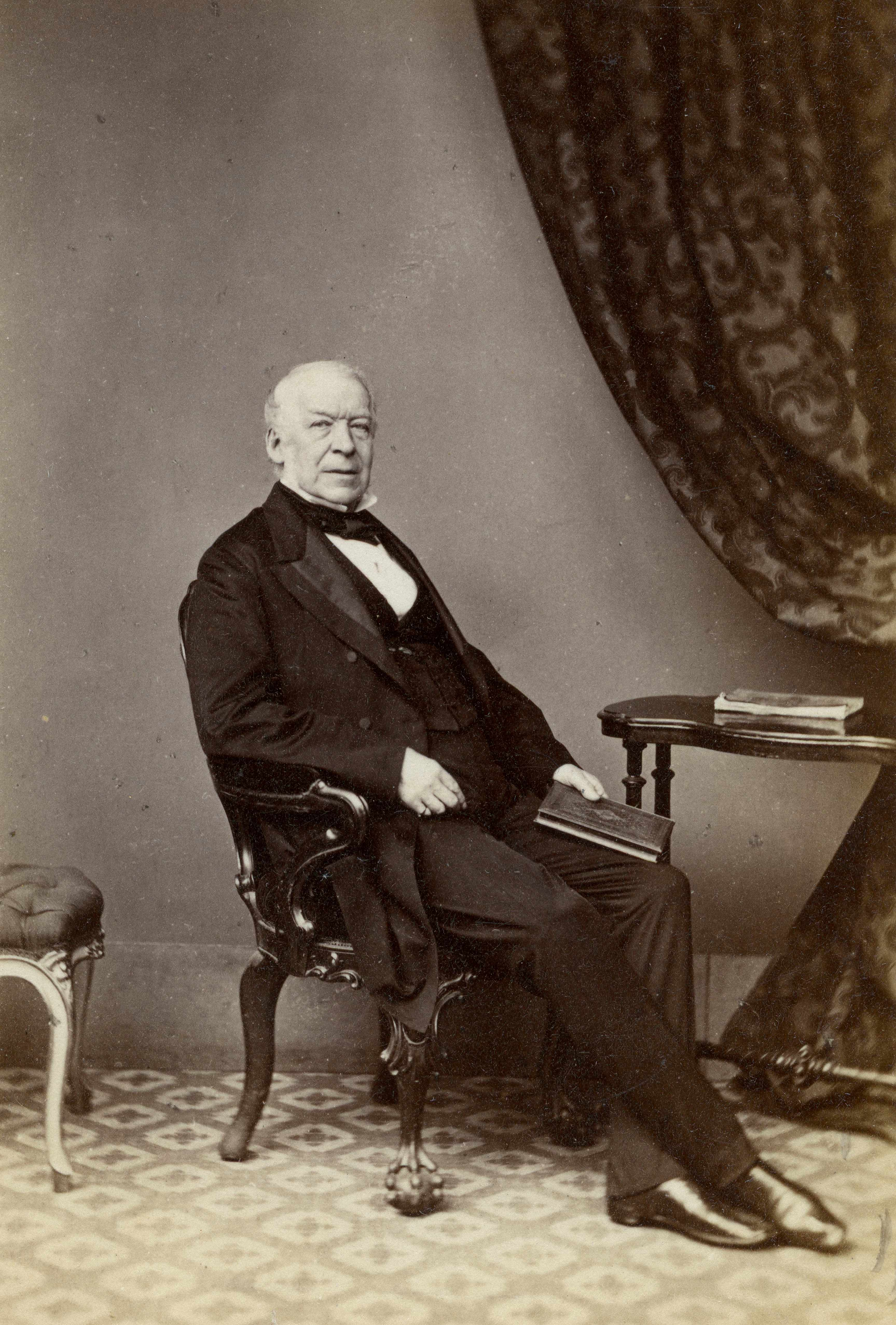
c. 1865

Henry George Bohn (4 January 1796 – 22 August 1884) was a British publisher. He is principally remembered for the Bohn's Libraries series which he inaugurated. These were begun in 1846, targeted the mass market, and comprised editions of standard works and translations, dealing with history, science, classics, theology, and archaeology.

== Biography ==
Bohn was born in London. He was the son of a German bookbinder who had settled in England. In 1831, he began his career as a dealer in rare books and remainders. In 1841 he issued his "Guinea" Catalogue of books, a monumental work containing 23,208 items. Bohn was noted for his book auction sales: one held in 1848 lasted four days, the catalogue comprising twenty folio pages. Printed on this catalogue was the information: "Dinner at 2 o'clock, dessert at 4, tea at 5, and supper at 10."

In 1846, he also started publishing The British Florist; Or, Lady's Journal of Horticulture, which had six volumes with illustrations and plates (coloured).

The name of Bohn is principally remembered by the important Bohn's Libraries which he inaugurated: these were begun in 1846 and comprised editions of standard works and translations, dealing with history, science, classics, theology, and archaeology, consisting in all of 766 volumes. His authors included Julia Corner, who created educational books about India and China for him in the 1850s.

The reasons for the success of Bohn's Libraries may have included their marketing to a general mass readership with volumes selling at low prices, their "lack of literary pretensions", and their "policy of a widespread, but restrained expurgation".

One of Bohn's most useful and laborious undertakings was his revision (6 vols. 1864) of The Bibliographer's Manual of English Literature (1834) by W. T. Lowndes. The plan includes bibliographical and critical notices, particulars of prices, etc., and a considerable addition to the original work.

It had been one of Bohn's ambitions to found a great publishing house, but, finding that his sons had no taste for the trade, he sold his Bohn's Libraries in 1864 to Messrs. Bell and Daldy, afterwards G. Bell & Sons. At that time the Bohn's Libraries included more than 600 titles. In subsequent years, he disposed of all his copyrights and business properties, finally realizing £73,000 overall.

Bohn was a man of wide culture and many interests. He collected pictures, china and ivories, and was a famous rose-grower.

He died at Twickenham and was buried at West Norwood Cemetery.

== Works ==
Among his own works were:

- The Hand-book of Games (1850)
- A Hand-book of Proverbs (1855)
- A Polyglot of Foreign Proverbs (1857)
- The Origin and Progress of Printing (1857)
- A Guide to the Knowledge of Pottery and Porcelain (1857)
- Biography and Bibliography of Shakespeare (1863)
- A Dictionary of Quotations From the English Poets (1867)

Besides his edition of Lowndes' Bibliographer's Manual, he developed an edition of Addison's works.

== Sources ==
- This article incorporates text from a publication now in the public domain: Rines, George Edwin, ed. (1920). "Bohn, Henry George" . Encyclopedia Americana.
