= Julia Corner =

British children's educational writer

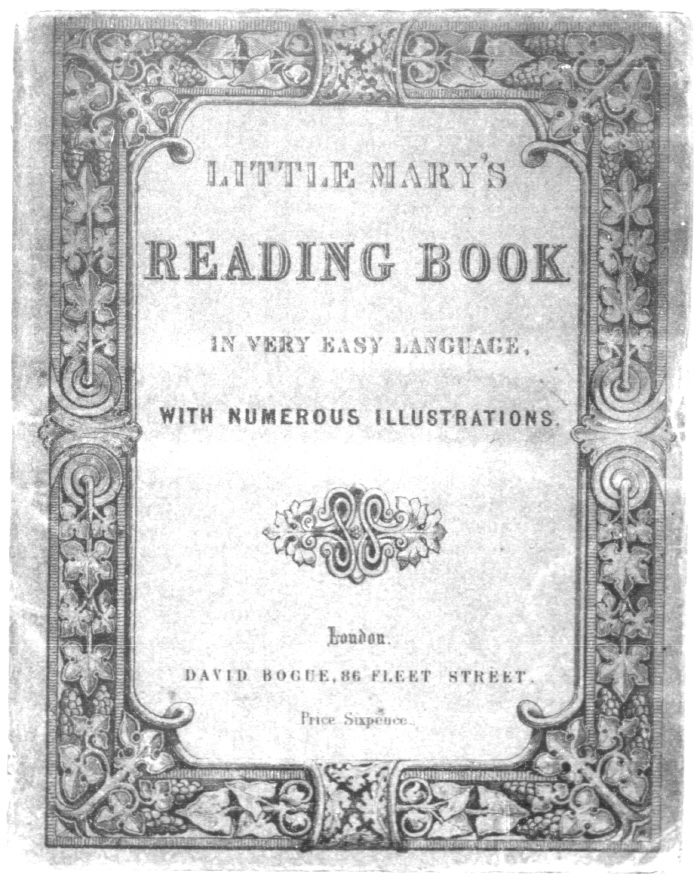
- Little Mary's Reading Book
- Born: 1798; London, England
- Died: 16 August 1875 (aged 76–77); Notting Hill
- Writing career
- Pen name: Miss Julia Corner
- Genre: instructional books for children

Julia Corner (1798–1875), also known as Miss Corner, was a British children's educational writer who created Miss Corner's Historical Library.

== Life ==
Corner was born in London in 1798. Her father, John Corner, was an engraver. She initially wrote novels which she continued after she became associated with a series of history books. In 1840 she published The History of Spain and Portugal and the History of France. The former was criticised by the Church of England Quarterly Review as an "apologist for the Jesuits" although "Miss Julia Corner"'s good intentions and the low price of her books was appreciated. These history books eventually covered many countries and built up into what was known as Miss Corner's Historical Library.

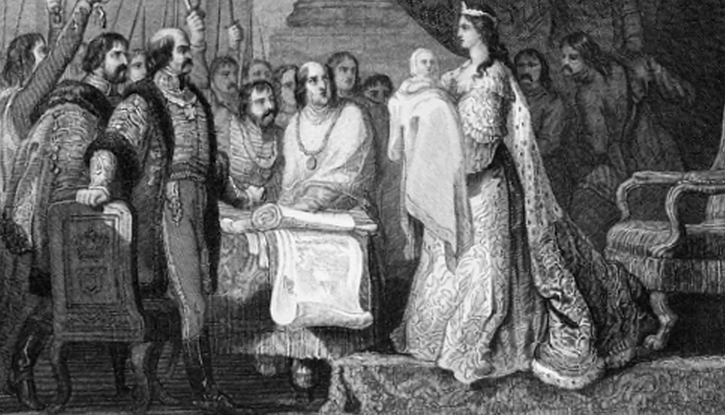
Engraving by Davenport (after Sir John Gilbert) for Corner's Germany and the Austrian Empire published by Dean and Son c.1854 showing Maria Theresa of Austria showing her infant son

Corner wrote simple stories for children and books for their instruction as well as history books about the ancient Britons, Saxons, and Normans. She was published by low cost publishers like Henry George Bohn for whom she created books about India and China in the 1850s. Her books about countries, Miss Corner's Historical Library, would be illustrated and they would include anecdotes, tables of historical events, maps, different aspects of history and questions were raised that related to the text in the style of Richmal Mangnall. Corner had published an educational book based around questions about Europe which she saw as a sequel to Richmal Mangnall's Questions for the Use of Young People.

Corner also created revised editions of other writer's books including Anne Rodwell's A Child's First Step to the History of England. Her usually conservative books also included plays for children in Dean & Son's series, Little Plays for Little People which she advocated for their educational value. In 1854, she wrote a play for children based around the Beauty and the Beast fairy story which was illustrated by Alfred Henry Forrester working under his nom de plume of Alfred Crowquill.

Corner died in Notting Hill on 16 August 1875. She was unmarried and had no children and left her name associated with nearly 250 different works.
