= Isabella Frances Romer =

English writer

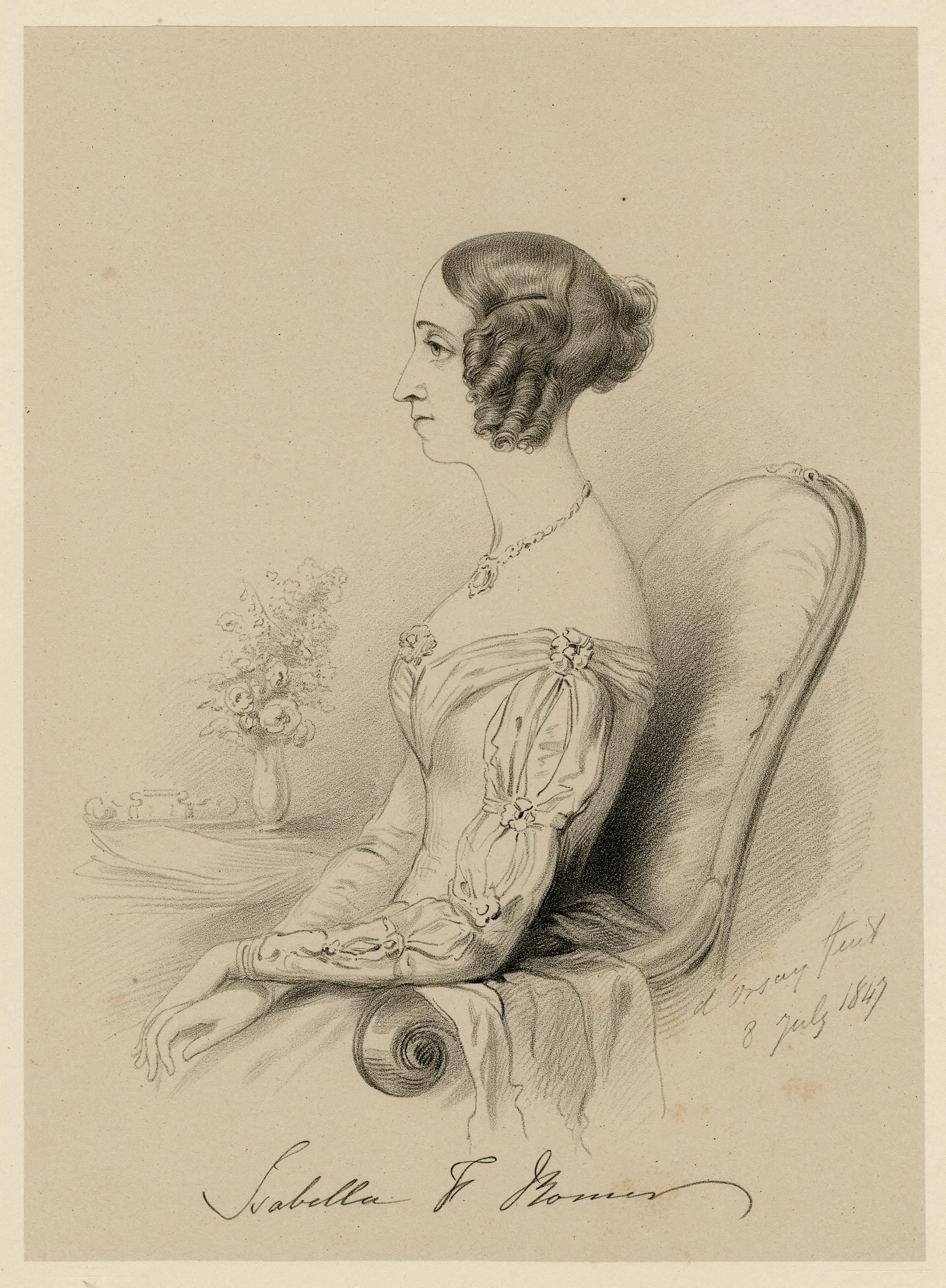
- Isabella Frances Romer (1849)
- Born: 13 May 1798; London, England
- Died: April 27, 1852 (aged 53); London, England
- Occupation: Author
- Spouse(s): William Medows Hamerton (m.1818, div.1830)
- Partner(s): John Thomas Bushe (1827—)
- Children: 1
- Writing career
- Pen name: Mrs. Hamerton; Mrs. Romer
- Language: English
- Years active: 1840—1852
- Genres: Travel; Fiction
- Notable works: Sturmer, a Tale of Mesmerism

Isabella Frances Romer (13 May 1798 – 27 April 1852) was an English novelist, travel writer, and biographer.

== Family ==
The eldest child of army officer Brigadier-General John William Augustus "Handsome Jack" Romer (1750-1802), (Note: The Times of 8 May 1799 (p.2) noted that "Colonel John William Augustus Romer, of the 62d Foot, is appointed Brigadier-General in the Leeward Islands only".) (Note: "Monthly Obituary: Deaths Abroad: July 1802: On his passage from the West Indies, Brigadier-General Romer": The European Magazine and London Review, Vol.43, No. 1, (January 1803), p. 79.) and Mary Ann Romer (1772-), née Cuthbert, (Note: They were married in the Canadian province of Quebec on 24 September 1794; see, also, "Marriages" (1794).) Isabella Frances Romer was born in London on 13 May 1798, and was baptised at Marylebone, Middlesex, now part of the City of Westminster. (Note: "[The son of Captain John Romer (1713-1775)], John William Romer, baptised 6th April 1750 at Berwick, and known as "Handsome Jack", was admitted to the freedom of the borough [of Berwick on] 26th August 1774; having in the preceding month of February made a run-away match with Jane, daughter of Richard Grieve of Alnwick and Swarland. Having entered the army, he became a captain in the 60th Regiment and ultimately a general officer. He had (perhaps with other) issue two daughters, viz. Caroline, wife of Baron de Rightenfelt [sic, ? Lichtenfeld], an Austrian subject, and Isabella Augusta [sic], wife of Colonel Hammerton of Rathronan, county Tipperary." (Hodgson, 1919, pp. 389-390).) Apart from the House Of Commons' descriptions of her mother's situation in 1814, when Romer was just 15, (Note: Name: "Mary Ann Romer"; Annual amount of pension: "£.100 — —"; From what time: "November 1803"; On what Account: "Widow of B. General J. W. A. Romer, late Major in the 62d Regiment, in consideration of her Husband’s faithful Services of more than 30 years, and of his having left her at his death (which took place in his passage from the West Indies) with two female Children, in a destitute situation." (H.C.1, p. 717).) little is known of her family and its circumstances before and after the death of her father.

=== Marriage ===
Isabella Frances Romer married Major (later Colonel) William Medows Hamerton (1790-1860) of the 7th Fusiliers, in France, at the house of the British Ambassador, on 24 December 1818. They had one child; a daughter, Frances Augusta Caroline Hamerton (1820-1898), later, Mrs. Frederick William Charles Buxton Whalley.

=== Separation and divorce ===
Romer separated from Hamerton on 27 March 1827, due to her adultery. Her co-respondent, John Thomas Bushe (1794—1870), was also married. Immediately upon her separation from Hamerton, she reverted to her maiden name, and went to Paris to live with Bushe, who had also left England for France in March 1827 to avoid being served legal papers by Hamerton's solicitor ("Minutes of Evidence", pp. 6–7).

Hamerton was eventually granted a divorce from Romer, by Parliament, in 1830; he remarried, marrying Sarah Ann Strangways (1798-1873) at Cheltenham, Gloucestershire on 7 July 1830. Romer never married again.

== Author ==
Uses and abuses of Animal Magnetism
(Isabella Frances Romer's Introduction to Sturmer (1841) pp.6-8.)

The writer of these pages, in thus expressing herself, affirms only what she
has witnessed. Originally sceptical upon the subject, she was yet willing to be
convinced by the testimony of her own senses, and shrank equally from the in-
justice of withholding, or the weakness of according, belief upon mere hearsay;
and, in order to preclude the possibility of deception, submitted herself, in the
first instance, to a series of experiments, under the direction of a skilful and
experienced physician. Dr. C—, of Vienna. Deep sleep and insensibility to pain,
and what is technically called lucidity, were successively produced in her; and
although she has no recollection of anything that occurred during those experi-
ments, except her own energetic struggles to resist the sleep that was stealing
over her and at last locked all her senses in oblivion, the notes that were taken
of all that occurred on these occasions by a friend who was present, were a
startling evidence to her of not merely the existence of the magnetic principle,
but of its wonderful and mysterious influence upon mind as well as matter. The
results in her case fell far short of those she has since witnessed in others; but
they were sufficient to set her previous doubts at rest for ever, and to awaken
in her mind a train of conflicting reflections as to the incalculable benefits that
may be derived from Animal Magnetism when properly and conscientiously
exercised, and the dreadful abuses to which it is liable from the extraordinary
moral ascendancy obtained by the magnetizer over the magnetized,—an
ascendancy which, in the hands of a corrupt and unprincipled person, may be,
and has been, turned to the most dishonourable purposes. The trust should,
therefore, never be lightly confided, and the character and habits of magnetizers
should be thoroughly ascertained before they are invested with the awful res-
ponsibility which attaches to their functions, or suffered to exercise an agency
which may shed its influence either "as airs from heaven or blasts from hell"
over the moral as well as the physical being of the persons who are for a time
spell-bound under the dominion of their will; and therefore unaccountable for
the actions to which that will may lead them. . . .

=== "Mrs. Hamerton" ===
In 1827, Mrs. Leslie and her Grandchildren, written by "Mrs. Hamerton" was published by Charles Tilt.

Jerrold's (1907, p. 213) claim, made 80 years after the event, that the "Mrs. Hamerton, care of Mrs. Reynolds", to whom Thomas Hood, had sent a letter and £15 (on behalf of Tilt's), was either "Charlotte Cox Reynolds", the mother of John Hamilton Reynolds, or "Eliza Reynolds", Hood's sister-in-law, and Reynolds' wife — who had assumed the pen-name of "Mrs. Hamerton" and had written the work in question — was entirely mistaken; it was, indeed, the real "Mrs. Hamerton".

Although no mention of the non-Romer work, Mrs. Leslie and her Grandchildren, is made in any of the posthumous accounts of Romer's life and works, with Romer having separated from her husband on 27 March 1827 ("Minutes of Evidence", p. 13), Isabella Frances Romer — who would have submitted the final draft of her manuscript to the publisher before her separation (and, therefore, still "Mrs. Hamerton"), and was now overseas in France — was temporarily using her friend's London address for her commercial correspondence.

=== Travel ===
"Mrs. Romer", as she was known, gained a reputation mainly as a travel writer, based on the volumes The Rhone, the Darro, and the Guadalquivir. A Summer Ramble in 1842 (1843b, reprinted in 1847), A Pilgrimage to the Temples and Tombs of Egypt, Nubia and Palestine in 1845–6 (1846b), and The Bird of Passage, or, Flying Glimpses of Many Lands (1849a), the last consisting of "a series of short stories set in Eastern Europe & the Middle East".

Although encouraging the physical (rather than "armchair") travel of English women to the middle East, desiring "to warn others from those contingencies against which none had warned me", she stressed (1846, Vol.II, pp. 337–338) that travel in these domains could be extremely demanding for excessively "delicate" females:

"I think that tourists in general have heretofore made too light of the perils of travelling in this country, and that many lives may be sacrificed to their accidental or intentional carelessness in disguising facts. Syria, in its actual state, is indeed no country for a delicate woman to travel in. All the wealth in the world, all the precautions possible, will not procure for her those auxiliaries to comfort which custom has rendered necessary for her well-being. She must forget that such things as carriages and carriage-roads exist; she must ride all day over execrable roads and under a burning sun; she must sleep at night in a tent, which is either the hottest or the coldest of all shelters; and if fever or accident overtake her on her way, she must trust in God and her own constitution to help her through, for neither physician nor apothecary, nor a roof to shelter her suffering head, will be forthcoming, even should thousands be offered for them."

=== Fiction ===
"Mrs. Romer's" first book was a fictionalised account of mesmerism (a.k.a. animal magnetism), a controversial technique at the time: Sturmer: a Tale of Mesmerism (1841a).

"She had traveled extensively in France and Germany; and, from her own experiences and observations, she was totally convinced of the veracity of the phenomena of mesmerism. One of the main goals of writing her novel was to alert readers to the dangers of this most powerful tool in the wrong hands" (Yeates, 2013, p. 803). (Note: "The Manchester Times’ report on Lafontaine’s first and second Manchester Conversaziones (of 13 November 1841) includes a long passage from her introduction [to Sturmer] (pp.7-8), in which Romer speaks as herself (rather than in the voice of either the story’s narrator or one of the book’s characters) of the dangers of mesmerism in the wrong hands" (Yeates, 2013, p. 507).) (Note: "In 1841 Romer published her first work, Sturmer: a Tale of Mesmerism, in which she explored, through fiction, the doctrine or system popularized by the Austrian physician Franz Mesmer, according to which a hypnotic state can be induced by an influence known as "animal magnetism", exercised by the operator over the will and nervous system of the patient. Convinced of the "truth of mesmerism" by her own experience of the hypnotic state, and by observing the state in others, she sought to prove in Sturmer "the dreadful abuses to which (mesmerism) is liable from the extraordinary moral ascendancy obtained by the magnetizer over the magnetized" [Vol.I, p.7]" (Jones, 2004, p. 658).)

In 1840 she began to contribute sketches and short stories to Bentley's Miscellany and other periodicals, including The Albion, and Henry Colburn's New Monthly Magazine, the great rival to Bentley's.

Her biography of Marie Thérèse Charlotte, Duchess of Angoulême, was completed after her death by John Doran (1807–1878) and published as Filia Dolorosa (1852).

=== Appraisal ===
"Mrs. Romer" was described by a near-contemporary, the Irish writer Richard Robert Madden, as a "shrewd, lively, mystery-loving, and 'a leetle conceited', occasional authoress, prone to expatiate rather extensively on themes merely personal, and regarding her own feelings, but always redeeming slight defects of that nature by vivid delineations, and smart, interesting, and entertaining descriptions." Madden said that her descriptions of Palestine were "abounding more in sprightliness than spirituality".

== Death ==
Romer died of cancer in Belgravia, London on 27 April 1852.

== Works ==
=== "Mrs. Hamerton" ===
- 1827: Mrs. Leslie and her Grandchildren: A Tale, London: Charles Tilt.

=== Isabella Frances Romer ===
- 1840: "Some Account of the Turkish Pretender: An Extract from the Pilgrim's Scrap Book", Spirit of the Times, Vol.10, No. 14, (6 June 1840), pp.160-161.
- 1841a: Sturmer, a Tale of Mesmerism: To Which are Added Other Sketches from Life, in Three Volumes: Vol.I, Vol.II, Vol.III, London: Richard Bentley.
- 1841b: "A Mystery", Bentley's Miscellany, Vol.10, (July 1841), pp. 412-421.
- 1842a: "The Sultan Mahmoud and the Georgian Slave", Bentley's Miscellany, Vol.11, (January 1842), pp. 122-143.
- 1842b: "The Necromancer; or, Ghost versus Gramarye", Bentley's Miscellany, Vol.11, (January 1842), pp. 368-377.
- 1842c: "The Two Interviews: with an Illustration by George Cruikshank", Bentley's Miscellany, Vol.11, (January 1842), pp. 453-460.
- 1842d: "A Night in the Adriatic", Bentley's Miscellany, Vol.12, (July 1842), pp. 582-460.
- 1843a: "The Rock of Barabaké", Bentley's Miscellany, Vol.13, (January 1843), pp. 345-353.
- 1843b: The Rhone, the Darro, and the Guadalquivir: A Summer Ramble in 1842, in Two Volumes: Vol.I, Vol.II, London: Richard Bentley.
- 1844a: "The Blue Fiacre; or, The Parisian Othello", The Albion, Vol.3, No. 15, (13 April 1844), pp.177-179.
- 1844b: "The Lover's Rock: A Legend of Andalusia", The New Monthly Magazine, Vol.72, No. 286, (October 1844), pp. 196-211, No. 287, (November 1844), pp.363-376.
- 1845a: "The Fête of Peterhoff", Bentley's Miscellany, Vol.17, (January 1845), pp. 22-33.
- 1845b: "St. Sylvester's Night", Bentley's Miscellany, Vol.17, (January 1845), pp. 577-585.
- 1845c: "Story of a Picture: A Tale of Revenge and Murder", The Albion, Vol.4, No. 34, (23 August 1845), pp. 401-402.
- 1846a: "The Last Days of Riego", Bentley's Miscellany, Vol.19, (January 1846), pp. 261-267.
- 1846b: A Pilgrimage to the Temples and Tombs of Egypt, Nubia, and Palestine, in 1845-6, in Two Volumes: Vol.I, Vol.II, London: Richard Bentley.
- 1847a: "A Legend of Florence: Taken from and Italian Chronicle", The Keepsake for 1847, pp. 106-123.
- 1847b: "The Broken Vow", Bentley's Miscellany, Vol.21, (January 1847), pp. 51-61.
- 1848a: "A Romance of Ronda", The Keepsake for 1848, pp. 172-186.
- 1848b: "King Mob (The Last Days of the French Monarchy): with a Portrait of M. de Lamartine", Bentley's Miscellany, Vol.23, (January 1848), pp. 325-336.
- 1849a: The Bird of Passage, or, Flying Glimpses of Many Lands, in Three Volumes: Vol.I, Vol.II, Vol.III, London: Richard Bentley.
- 1849b: "Story of a Haunted House", Bentley's Miscellany, Vol.26, (July 1849), pp. 436-445.
- 1850: "The Tomb of Lady Blessington", The Albion, or British, Colonial and Foreign Weekly Gazette, Vol.9, No. 21, (25 May 1850), pp. 244-245.
- 1851a: "The Quarrel; or Lady Eleanor's Story", Gems of Beauty: or, Literary Gift for MDCCCLI, Boston, MA: Phillips, Sampson, and Company.
- 1851b: "The Capucin", The Ladies' Gift; or, Souvenir of Friendship, pp.12-24, Boston, MA: David P. King.
- 1852: Filia Dolorosa: Memoirs of Marie Thérèse Charlotte, Duchess of Angoulême, The Last of the Dauphines, in Two Volumes: Vol.I, Vol.II, London: Richard Bentley.

== See also ==
- Animal Magnetism – Pseudoscientific theory about force in living things
- Royal Commission on Animal Magnetism – 1784 French scientific bodies' investigations involving systematic controlled trials
- Travel literature – Literary genre
