= Richmal Mangnall =

English schoolbook writer (1769–1820)

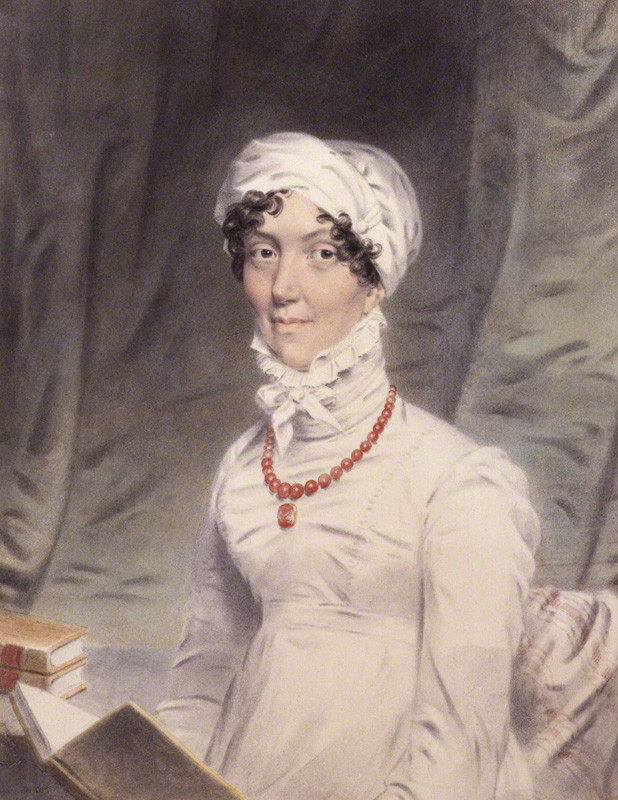
- Born: 7 March 1769
- Died: 1 May 1820
- Occupations: Writer, teacher

Richmal Mangnall (1769–1820) was an English schoolmistress and the writer of a famous schoolbook, Mangnall's Questions. This had been through 84 editions by 1857. She became the headmistress of Crofton Hall, a successful Yorkshire school, and remained so until her death.

== Early life ==
Richmal was born in Manchester on 7 March 1769 and baptised on 31 March. She was one of the seven children of James Mangnall of Hollinhurst, Lancashire, and London, and Richmal, daughter of John Kay of Manchester to survive infancy. One brother, James, became a London solicitor, another died in the East Indies in 1801. Her parents died about 1781, when she was adopted by an uncle, also John Kay, a Manchester solicitor.

== Questions and answers ==
Richmal Mangnall began to attend Mrs Wilson's successful school of about 70 pupils at Crofton Old Hall, a Georgian mansion near Wakefield, Yorkshire, built about 1750. There it was found possible for a teacher or senior pupil to teach big classes using a system of question and answer. Mangnall graduated from being a pupil to being a teacher in the school. The first edition of her Historical and Miscellaneous Questions for the Use of Young People (1798) was printed privately and anonymously for use there. It was taken up by the London publishing firm Longman, whose still anonymous 1800 edition was dedicated to John Kay.

The book became generally known as Mangnall's Questions and was "the stand-by of generations of governesses and other teachers". It had appeared in 84 editions by 1857. Its "level, plain, humane" judgments have been associated with the Age of Enlightenment, and became more open to criticism in the Victorian age, although the catechism type of textbook remained dominant. The British Constitution met with her approval, as did her country's abolition of the Atlantic slave trade, but Wellington was rebuked for vanity and egotism, and Rabelais for lacking "that delicacy without which genius may sparkle for a moment, but can never shine with pure, undiminished lustre."

== Later life and death ==
Details of life at Crofton House school appear in an unpublished childhood diary of Elizabeth Firth (born 1797 at Thornton, near Bradford). It was her recommendation that persuaded Patrick Brontë to send his daughters Maria and Elizabeth there for a short period from September-December 1823, before finding it too expensive. A later account of English social history recalls it as "one of the best known girls' schools" and states, "Here the girls learnt some literature, which consisted of Scott's longer poems and The Vicar of Wakefield, read aloud by Miss Mangnall herself, geography, spelling, the catechism, and a little pencil drawing. For bad spelling the young ladies were invariably sent to bed."

Miss Mangnall took over at Crofton about 1808 and supported her two unmarried sisters, Eliza and Sarah, from her successful school and publishing earnings. She continued to head it until her death there on 1 May 1820 "after a severe illness, which was borne with the utmost Christian resignation." She was buried in Crofton churchyard near her "inestimable friend" Elizabeth Fayrer (1782-1816). Fayrer was another teacher at Crofton (also mentioned in the Firth Journals) and the two have been described as "kindred spirits" and referred to each other as "dearest friends". In Mangnall's will she requested "to be interred in the same grave with my friend Elizabeth Fayrer in Crofton Church Yard." Her headstone reads, "Sacred to the Memory / of / Richmal Mangnall / of Crofton Hall / who departed this life on / May day 1820 // Ah when shall spring / visit the mouldering Urn / of Virtue Knowledge / Friendship naught / remain save her / blest soul now fled / to Realms of Bliss."

In 2013 a British Blue Plaque was dedicated to Richmal Mangnall by the Wakefield Civic Society.

== Publications ==
- Historical and Miscellaneous Questions For the Use of Young People (1798)
- Half an Hour's Lounge, or Poems (1805)
- Compendium of Geography (1815)

== Literary mentions ==
Mangnall's Questions appears in:

- Vanity Fair by William Makepeace Thackeray (1847-8), satire, "a pair of pink cheeks and blue eyes' inferior to 'the gifts of genius, the accomplishments of the mind, the mastery of Mangnall's Questions, and a ladylike knowledge of botany and geology."
- Tom Tiddler's Ground by Charles Dickens (1861), "Indeed, whenever Miss Pupford gives a little lecture on the mythology of the misguided heathens (always carefully excluding Cupid from recognition), and tells how Minerva sprang, perfectly equipped, from the brain of Jupiter, she is half supposed to hint, "So I myself came into the world, completely up in Pinnock, Mangnall, Tables, and the use of the Globes."
- Wives and Daughters by Elizabeth Gaskell (1866), "There was one of the heathen deities in Mangnall's Questions whose office it was to bring news." This references the chapter in Questions, "Alphabetical List of the Heathen Mythology, the Demigods, and Heroes of Greece and Rome", pp. 438 in the 1887 version.
- Middlemarch by George Eliot (1871–1872)
- Rose Turquand. A Novel. by Ellice Hopkins (1876), "From that moment, Rose's life was a hard one. Mademoiselle was possessed with but one idea – to make up for lost time, and work her up to the level of her other pupils. Pages of Mangnall's Questions were set her, which did not interest her; pages of dry geography, endless lists of names to which she attached no meaning; pages of grammar which she did not understand."
- The Wouldbegoods by Edith Nesbit (1901), "No one but that kind of black, beady, tight lady would say 'little boys'. She is like Miss Murdstone in David Copperfield. I should like to tell her so; but she would not understand. I don't suppose she has ever read anything but Markham's History and Mangnall's Questions – improving books like that."
- A Portrait of the Artist as a Young Man, by James Joyce (1916), satire, "some great person whose head was in the books of history... Those were the great men whose names were in Richmal Magnall's Questions. History was all about those men and what they did and that was what Peter Parley's Tales about Greece and Rome were all about."
- Farewell Victoria by T. H. White (1933) "Augusta relished the position of consoler at a sick-bed, and read to her out of Mangnall's Queries." (sic)

== See also ==
- Julia Corner (1798-1875) wrote a self-designated "sequel to Mangnall's Historical Questions" called Questions on the History of Europe
- Eliza Snelling, 'Eliza Snelling's historical charts, designed for Mangnall's Questions' (1862)
