= Samuel Bentley =

English printer and antiquarian

Samuel Bentley (1785–1868) was an English printer and antiquarian.

== Life ==
The second son of Edward Bentley and his wife Anne Nichols, sister of John Nichols, he was born 10 May 1785; Richard Bentley the publisher was a younger brother. He was educated at St Paul's School, London, and after an apprenticeship with Nichols was taken into partnership.

In 1819 Bentley went into partnership with his brother Richard, in Dorset Street, Salisbury Square; and on the latter taking over the business of Colburn, he established the firm of Samuel and John Bentley, Wilson, & Fley, at Bangor House, Shoe Lane, John being his nephew. He visited the type-foundry of Firmin Didot in Paris.

With failing eyesight, Bentley gave up his business in 1853. He retired to Croydon, with his wife whom he had married in 1825.

== Works ==
Bentley's major antiquarian work was the Excerpta Historica (1831), with which he had the assistance of Harris Nicolas, Sir Charles Young, Duffus Hardy, and others. He indexed the Literary Anecdotes of the Eighteenth Century by Nichols, and the History of Durham, by Robert Surtees. Other works were:

- Concio de Puero Jesu (editor, 1816), written by Erasmus at the request of John Colet. This edition is dedicated to John Sleath.
- An Abstract of Charters and other Documents contained in a Cartulary of the Abbey of St. Peter, Westminster, in the possession of S. B. (1836, for private circulation).

Bentley assisted Nicolas in preparing for publication the Scrope and Grosvenor Roll, which he read in manuscript in the Tower of London.

== Notes ==
Attribution

This article incorporates text from a publication now in the public domain: Stephen, Leslie, ed. (1885). "Bentley, Samuel". Dictionary of National Biography. Vol. 4. London: Smith, Elder & Co.
