= Charles Robert Forrester =

English lawyer and writer (1803–1850)

Charles Robert Forrester (1803, London – 15 January 1850, London) was an English lawyer and writer, who sometimes wrote under the pseudonym Hal Willis, frequently with illustrations provided by his brother Alfred Henry Forrester (1804–1872) who shared the pseudonym Alfred Crowquill.

== Career ==
His profession paid well, and he used his money and leisure to write. Under the pseudonym of "Hal Willis, student at law" he brought out in 1824 Castle Baynard, or the Days of John, and in 1827 a second novel entitled Sir Roland, a Romance of the Twelfth Century in four volumes. In 1826–27 he contributed to The Stanley Tales, Original and Select, chiefly Collected by Ambrose Marten, five volumes. Absurdities in Prose and Verse, written and illustrated by Alfred Crowquill appeared in 1827, the illustrations being by Alfred Forrester: here, as later, the two brothers used the same name conjointly.

Forrester also wrote for The Ladies' Museum and Louisa Henrietta Sheridan's annual Comic Offering. Under the editorship of Theodore Hook he was on the staff of the New Monthly Magazine in 1837 and 1838, where he used the name Alfred Crowquill, and inserted his first contribution, "Achates Digby", in xlix. 93–8.

At the close of 1839 he became connected with Bentley's Miscellany in which magazine his writings are sometimes (with illustrations by his brother) signed A. Crowquill and at other times Hal Willis. "Mr. Crocodile", in viii. 49–53 (1840), was the first of his series of papers. In 1843 a selection of his articles in those two magazines was brought out in two volumes under the title Phantasmagoria of Fun.

Forrester was also the author of Eccentric Tales, by W. F. von Kosewitz, 1827, The Battle of the Annuals, a Fragment, 1835, and The Lord Mayor's Fool, 1840, the last two of which were anonymous. He wrote other works, but his name did not appear in the British Museum Catalogue nor in any of the ordinary nineteenth-century books on English bibliography. He was an English classicist and well acquainted with the Latin, French, German, and Dutch languages. His writings, like his conversation, were noted for their spontaneous wit.

== Personal life ==
Charles Robert Forrester was a son of Robert Forrester of 5 North Gate, Royal Exchange, London, a public notary. He succeeded his father as a notary, having his place of business at 5 North Piazza, Royal Exchange; he later moved to 28 Royal Exchange, where he remained until his death.

He died from heart disease at his house in Beaumont Square, Mile End, London, leaving a widow and four children.
