= Temple Bar (magazine) =

English literary periodical

Temple Bar was a literary periodical of the mid and late 19th and very early 20th centuries (1860–1906). The complete title was Temple Bar – A London Magazine for Town and Country Readers. It was initially edited by George Augustus Sala, and Arthur Ransome was the final editor before it folded, while he developed his literary career. It was also edited by Mary Elizabeth Braddon.

== History ==
Temple Bar was founded a year after the first publication of William Thackeray's The Cornhill Magazine, by one of Charles Dickens' followers, Sala, who promised his readers that the periodical would be "full of solid yet entertaining matter, that shall be interesting to Englishmen and Englishwomen…and that Filia-familias may read with as much gratification as Pater or Mater-familias", appealing to a solid, literate middle-class. A rather congratulary review of the arrival of the impending publication appeared in the New York Times in October 1860 saying that it promised "The name is a happy one; pregnant with good things and seasoned with the promise of Attic salt".

It sold for about one shilling, and was one of the leading literary magazines of the era. 553 issues were published – up to 1906, about one a month. It published work by writers such as Amy Levy, Jane Austen, Wilkie Collins, Charles Reade, Robert Louis Stevenson, Anthony Trollope, Arthur Conan Doyle, E. F. Benson and Jessie Fothergill. Initially the magazine achieved a circulation of some 30,000 which eventually settled at around the 13,000 mark in the late 1860s. In 1868 Bentley's Magazine was merged into it. By 1896 circulation had dropped to about 8,000. Arthur Ransome also started his career as publisher there.

It should not be confused with a bi-monthly published in Dublin, Ireland of the same name published in the first decade of the 21st century.
