= Bentley's Miscellany =

English literary magazine

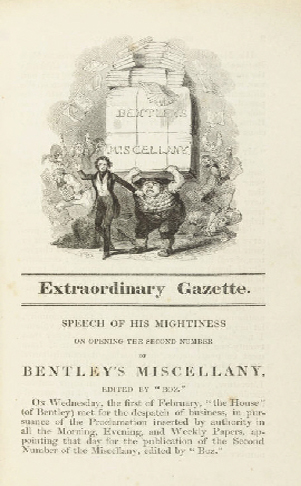
- Cover of the March 1837 issue
- Editor: William Harrison Ainsworth (1839–1868)
- Former editors: Charles "Boz" Dickens (1836–1838)
- Frequency: Monthly
- Publisher: Richard Bentley
- Founder: Richard Bentley
- First issue: 1836; 190 years ago
- Final issue: 1868
- Country: England
- Based in: London
- Language: English
- ISSN: 1751-8466
- OCLC: 889228102

Bentley's Miscellany was an English literary magazine started by Richard Bentley. It was published between 1836 and 1868.

== Contributors ==
Already a successful publisher of novels, Bentley began the journal in 1836 and invited Charles Dickens to be its first editor. Dickens serialised his second novel Oliver Twist, but soon fell out with Bentley over editorial control, calling him a "Burlington Street Brigand". He resigned as editor in 1839 and William Harrison Ainsworth took over. Ainsworth would also only stay in the job for three years, but bought the magazine from Bentley a decade later. In 1868 Ainsworth sold the magazine back to Bentley, who merged it with the Temple Bar Magazine.

Aside from the works of Dickens and Ainsworth other significant authors published in the magazine included: Wilkie Collins, Catharine Sedgwick, Richard Brinsley Peake, Thomas Moore, Thomas Love Peacock, William Mudford, Thomas Medwin, Mrs Henry Wood, Charles Robert Forrester (sometimes under the pseudonym Hal Willis), Frances Minto Elliot, Isabella Frances Romer, The Ingoldsby Legends and some of Edgar Allan Poe's short stories. It published drawings by the caricaturist George Cruikshank, and was the first publication to publish cartoons by John Leech, who became a prominent Punch cartoonist.
